= Canton of Saint-Cyprien =

Coordinates: 44°52′N 1°03′E

Saint-Cyprien
- Former canton
- Interactive map of Saint-Cyprien
- Country: France
- Region: Nouvelle-Aquitaine
- Department: Dordogne
- No. of communes: {{{nbcomm}}}
- Disbanded: 2015
- Area: 185.35 km^{2} (71.56 sq mi)
- Population (2012): 7,054
  - Density: 38.06/km^{2} (98.57/sq mi)

The Canton of Saint-Cyprien is a former canton of the Dordogne département, in France. It was disbanded following the French canton reorganisation which came into effect in March 2015. It had 7,054 inhabitants (2012). The lowest point is 45 m in the commune of Coux-et-Bigaroque, the highest point is in Bézenac at 317 m, the average elevation is 96 m. The most populated commune was Saint-Cyprien with 1,581 inhabitants (2012).

== Communes ==
The canton comprised the following communes:

- Allas-les-Mines
- Audrix
- Berbiguières
- Bézenac
- Castels
- Coux-et-Bigaroque
- Les Eyzies-de-Tayac-Sireuil
- Marnac
- Meyrals
- Mouzens
- Saint-Chamassy
- Saint-Cyprien
- Saint-Vincent-de-Cosse
- Tursac

== Population history ==
Year	Population
1962	5,849
1968	6,313
1975	5,940
1982	6,052
1990	6,086
1999	6,483

== See also ==
- Cantons of the Dordogne department
