= Mischief (disambiguation) =

Mischief is an offense against property that does not involve conversion.

Mischief may also refer to:

- Mischief (1931 film), a British comedy film
- Mischief (1985 film), a teen comedy film
- Mischief (yacht), the victorious American defender of the fourth America's Cup race
- Mr. Mischief, a character in the Mr. Men series
- SS Mischief, the original name of the USS Arneb, a US Navy attack cargo ship
- The Mischief, a pub in Norwich, England
- A group of rats

== See also ==
- Mischief Reef, a reef in the Spratly Islands in the South China Sea
- Masti (2004 film) (English: Mischief), a Bollywood comedy
- Mischief Theatre, a British theatre company
- MSCHF, an American art collective
