= The Night of Suspects =

1960 film

- Directed by: Víctor Merenda
- Written by: Robert Thomas; Frédéric Dard
- Based on: Huit femmes by Robert Thomas
- Produced by: Albert Caraco; Marius Lesoeur
- Starring: Geneviève Kervine; Christine Carère; Elina Labourdette
- Cinematography: Quinto Albicocco
- Edited by: Georges Arnstam
- Music by: Philippe-Gérard
- Production companies: Gamma Film; Sopadec
- Distributed by: Sopadec
- Release date: 30 August 1960
- Running time: 90 minutes
- Country: France
- Language: French

The Night of Suspects (French: La nuit des suspectes) is a 1960 French crime film directed by Víctor Merenda and starring Geneviève Kervine, Christine Carère and Elina Labourdette. Based on the play Huit femmes by Robert Thomas it was shot in 1957 but its release was delayed for several years. The film's sets were designed by the art director Claude Bouxin. It is also known by the alternative title Eight Women in Black (French: Huit femmes en noir).

== Synopsis ==
An industrialist is shot dead at his home. He lived surrounded by eight women, his various relatives and servants, and the investigating police inspector has to work out which of the woman killed him.

== Cast ==
- Geneviève Kervine as Suzon Farnoux
- Christine Carère as Catherine Farnoux
- Elina Labourdette as Gaby Farnoux
- Béatrice Arnac as Mlle. Farnoux
- Yva Bella as Augusta
- Colette Régis as Mammy
- Annie Roudier as La nounou
- Guylaine Guy as Chambermaid
- Yves Massard as Inspecteur Duret

== Bibliography ==
- Bessy, Maurice & Chirat, Raymond. Histoire du cinéma français: 1956-1960. Pygmalion, 1990.
- Rège, Philippe. Encyclopedia of French Film Directors, Volume 1. Scarecrow Press, 2009.
