= Béatrice Arnac =

French actress and singer (1931–2020)

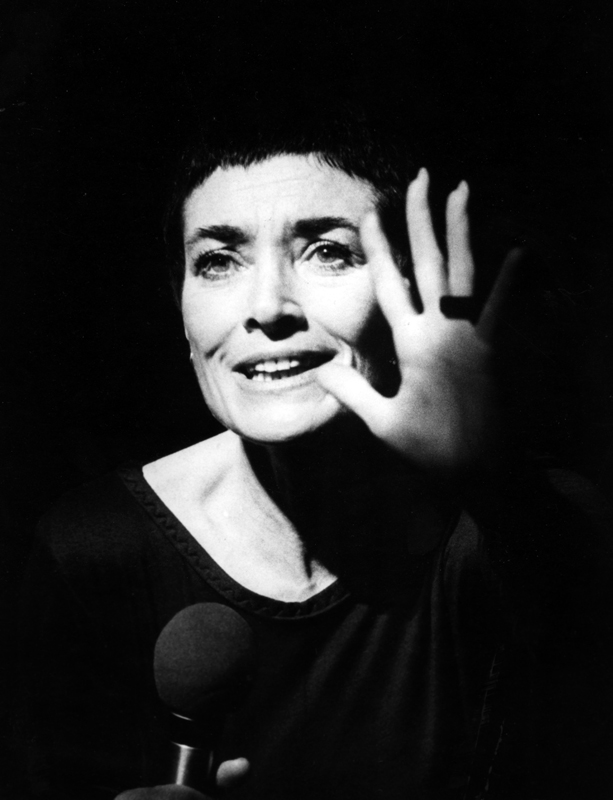
- Born: 23 April 1931; Suresnes, Hauts-de-Seine, Paris, France
- Died: 5 October 2020 (age 89); Castels et Bézenac, France
- Occupations: Actress; Singer

Béatrice Arnac (23 April 1931 – 5 October 2020) was a French actress, singer, and composer.

== Biography ==
The daughter of the cartoonist Marcel Arnac, Béatrice was also the niece of explorer Marie Gallaud.

In 1962, she received the Grand Prize of the Académie Charles Cros. She performed 22 songs that were written by songwriters such as Paul Éluard, Paul Verlaine, Arthur Rimbaud, Robert Desnos, and Bertolt Brecht. She also performed in the second act of the play Le Bel indifférent. She performed at the Théâtre des Champs-Élysées and on the television show La Chance aux chansons. She was part of the cast of La Traversée de Paris, released in 1956.

Béatrice Arnac died in Castels et Bézenac on 5 October 2020.

== Filmography ==
=== Cinema ===
- La Fille de Mata Hari/Mata Hari's Daughter/La figlia di Mata Hari (1955)
- Frou-Frou (1955)
- Lola Montès (1955)
- Lord Rogue (1955)
- La vie est belle (1956)
- La Traversée de Paris (1956)
- Les Truands (1956)
- OSS 117 n'est pas mort/OSS 117 Is Not Dead (1957)
- Le Souffle du désir (1958)
- The Night of Suspects (1960)
- Le Soupirant/The Suitor (1962)
- La Journée de Pernette (1963) (short)
- Dernier Domicile connu/Last Known Address (1970)
- Midi Minuit (1970)
- Les Petites Filles modèles/Good Little Girls (1971)
- Hunter Nights (2018)

=== Television ===
- Isabelle (1970)

=== Soundtracks ===
- Le Soupirant/The Suitor (1962), performer of "O toi l'amour"

== Discography ==
- Chante Alain Saury (1963)
- La rue Saint-Jean (1964)
- L'amour (1964)
- Beatrice Arnac (1966)
- Chansons de France (1967)
- Les Temps Des Amazones (1968)
- Beatrice Arnac (1973)
- Animale (1979)
- En Liberté En Public Au Fanal (1979)
- Béatrice Arnac chante Zo d'Axa (2001)

== Theatre ==
- Scabreuse Aventure at the Théâtre du Vieux-Colombier (1957)
- Nouvelle Orléans at the Théâtre de l'Étoile (1958)
- Rosa la Rose at the Théâtre des Capucines (1960)
- Caviar ou lentilles at the Théâtre Michel (1965)
