= Mouzens =

Mouzens may refer to two communes in France:

- Mouzens, Dordogne, in the Dordogne département
- Mouzens, Tarn, in the Tarn département
