= Raumpatrouille – Die phantastischen Abenteuer des Raumschiffes Orion =

- Genre: Science fiction
- Created by: Rolf Honold; Hans Gottschalk a.k.a. W.G. Larsen
- Directed by: Theo Mezger; Michael Braun
- Starring: Dietmar Schönherr; Eva Pflug; Wolfgang Völz; Claus Holm; Friedrich G. Beckhaus; Ursula Lillig; Charlotte Kerr; Franz Schafheitlin
- Composer: Peter Thomas
- Country of origin: West Germany
- Original language: German
- No. of seasons: 1
- No. of episodes: 7

Production
- Producers: Hans Gottschalk; Helmut Krapp
- Cinematography: Kurt Hasse; W.P. Hassenstein
- Editors: Anneliese Schönnenbeck; Johannes Nikel
- Running time: 60 min each
- Production company: Bavaria Atelier GmbH

Original release
- Network: ARD
- Release: 17 September – 10 December 1966

Raumpatrouille – Die phantastischen Abenteuer des Raumschiffes Orion (lit. 'Space Patrol – The Fantastic Adventures of the Spaceship Orion'), also known as Raumpatrouille Orion, and Space Patrol Orion in English, is a West German science fiction television series. Its seven episodes were broadcast by ARD from 17 September 1966. It was the first German science fiction TV series. With audience ratings as high as 56%, it was a huge success and racked up numerous reruns. Over the years, the series acquired a distinct cult status in Germany.

== Premise ==
In the series, nations no longer exist and Earth is united. Flying saucers, such as spaceship Orion, are flown by humans, whilst the aliens fly fighter jet-like aircraft. The titular ship, "Spaceship Orion", (German: "Raumschiff Orion") is portrayed as being a fast space cruiser (German: Schneller Raumkreuzer), the newest starship in mankind's fleet and the fastest spacecraft ever created by humans.

The show tells the story of Commander Cliff Allister McLane (Dietmar Schönherr), an Earth starship captain and his loyal crew. He is Orion's commander in the developing war against an alien race called the Frogs (so-called also in the German original). He is notoriously defiant towards his superiors.

The seven stories in the TV series are set in the years 3000 to 3003 during the period that the Orion and its crew are demoted to serve in the lowly space patrol sector and are monitored by an onboard security officer.

Throughout the series, reference is made to two galactic interplanetary wars. The first war took place 400–500 years before the series setting (referenced in episode 5 - Battle for the Sun) when Neptune Colony joined the rebels against the Earth's control.

The story posits that there are no nation-states in 3000. In episode 5 - Battle for the Sun, the character Hasso comments that he has "as much chance to be the Emperor of China" when making a comparison on the planet Chroma.

== Characters ==
- Major Cliff Allister McLane (Dietmar Schönherr) is the commander of the Orion and a friend to most of its crew. He is a daredevil and hero who does not fight for money or glory, but for peace. He has been a member of Earth's space fleet for 15 years and was a soldier in at least one previous large-scale war (in the novels, these adventures of Cliff and his crew were described, too). As a running gag, McLane often has to destroy the spaceship Orion to save Earth, afterwards being awarded command of a better vessel (also named "Orion"). In the TV series it was shown only with the destruction of the Orion VII, though in the novels it went as far as to the Orion X-C. Cliff Alistair (the spelling used in the novels following the TV series) He is of American descent with Scottish ancestry.
- Lt. Mario de Monti (Wolfgang Völz) is the computer specialist and gunner ("armament officer") of the Orion and a good friend of Commander McLane. He is often shown drinking with his friends and he is a womanizer who likes to flirt with young, attractive women (not even Tamara is safe from him, but she turned him down quite firmly). The de Monti character is of Italian descent.
- Lt. Atan Shubashi (Friedrich G. Beckhaus) is the astrogator and star cartographer of the Orion. He is the owner of 264, one of the last 367 poodles that still exist on Earth. This character is of Japanese descent.
- Lt. Hasso Sigbjörnson (Claus Holm) is the Orion's engineer. He likes to drink and is the only crew member who is married (his wife is named Ingrid and he always promises her to retire from active duty). He is an old friend of Commander McLane who usually helps him to explain to Ingrid why he can't retire after all. Both Hasso and Ingrid are of Scandinavian descent.
- Lt. Helga Legrelle (Ursula Lillig) is the surveillance and communication officer of the Orion. Like the other members of the crew, she dislikes Tamara Jagellovsk and feels monitored by her. Like Jagellovsk, Legrelle has a secret crush on Commander McLane and reacts very jealously whenever she notices Jagellovsk paying too much attention to him. She is of French descent.
- Lt. Tamara Jagellovsk (Eva Pflug) is a member of the GSD ("Galaktischer Sicherheitsdienst", German for "Galactic Security Service", the military intelligence service) who has been given the task of keeping McLane under control. Tamara likes McLane, however, and is very amused by his sense of humour. The Crew at first strongly dislike her, but with time they develop a feeling of mutual respect. Tamara can issue "Alpha Orders" which are orders of highest priority that have to be obeyed by McLane at all cost. She is of Russian descent.
- Frogs are a highly advanced and very intelligent, energy-like race of extraterrestrial conquerors who are attempting to destroy Earth's space fleet and eliminate mankind. They have extremely fast starships and powerful energy weapons. Some of their technological abilities are superior to Earth's, but oxygen is poisonous to them. In the novels, it is finally revealed what they called themselves: Uraceel / Turceed.
- General Winston Woodrow Wamsler (Benno Sterzenbach) is McLane's commanding officer while McLane is demoted to 3 years of space patrol duty at the TRAV ("Terrestrische Raumaufklärungsverbände", "Terran Space Reconnaissance Division"). His name implies an English or American background.
- General Lydia van Dyke (Charlotte Kerr) was Cliff's original commanding officer in the year 3000 when McLane was still at the "Schnelle Kampfverbände" ("Fast Battle Cruiser Division") and she expected him "not to go away sulking like a space cadet" when he was demoted, but to return to her fleet after his 3 years of patrol duty. She is also the commanding officer of the space ship Hydra. Given her surname she is presumably of Dutch descent.
- Oberst (= Colonel) Hendryk Villa (Friedrich Joloff) is the head of the GSD ("Galaktischer Sicherheitsdienst", "Galactic Security Service") and thus the boss of Lt. Tamara Jagellovsk. He is of German descent.
- Lt. Michael Spring-Brauner (Thomas Reiner) is the aide-de-camp to Gen. Wamsler and has a strong dislike towards McLane and his crew (which is mutual). He is a stuck-up bureaucrat and tries to make McLane's life as miserable as he can. Another character of Teutonic descent.
- Space Marshal Kublai Krim (Hans Cossy) is the commanding officer of the Earth Space Forces (Kommandeur der Raumstreitkräfte). His name implies a Ukrainian-Mongolian background.
- Sir Arthur (Franz Schafheitlin) is the head of the Earth Space Forces, the Supreme Space Authority, ORB (Oberbefehlshaber der Raumstreitkräfte). Sir Arthur's character is obviously of English descent.
- von Wennerstein (Emil Stöhr) is a representative of the Earth government.
- Clarence, Tim, and Francois, the far-space station MZ4 station crew. They are all found in a form of statis due to the attack by the alien frogs removing all the air (oxygen) from the far-space station.

== Fictional technology ==
- Astrodisc (German "Astroscheibe") is a viewing screen that can produce holographic images of space. It has the same function as the bridge screen of the Enterprise in Star Trek. The astrodisc forms the centerpiece of the Orion's bridge.
- Light-thrower batteries (German "Lichtwerferbatterie") are the weapons most frequently used by Earth's space fleet and the ships of the Frogs. These weapons come in many different sizes, ranging from hand lasers to planet-destructing cannons. Orion was the first German production to feature the English word "laser".
- Antimatter bombs are bombs containing antimatter and were used in the attempt to destroy the "Supernova" in the 2nd episode ("Planet außer Kurs", Planet off Course).
- Overkill is a new weapon that was introduced in the 4th episode ("Deserteure"), and that was installed on the Orion as the first Earth space ship. It seems to be a disintegrator-style weapon that is able to cause enormous craters hundreds of kilometres wide and even obliterate whole planets.
- ASG wrist-worn communication devices (in German: "Armbandsprechgerät") are part of the technology of Earth's space fleet.
- Robots (German "Roboter") are helpers, guards and even housekeepers in the world of tomorrow. Their use is shown to be problematic, because they are depicted as suffering from frequent malfunctions, making them dangerous to human beings (especially if they are battle robots). They first appear in the series in episode 3 "Keepers of the Law" as saucer-shaped mining machines quasi-levitating on one bow-leg. They are constrained by Isaac Asimov's Three Laws of Robotics, about which a lecture is given at the beginning of the episode. Later they appear as androids and floating battle robots. Some of the humanoid robots are very similar in design to the modern Vietnamese robot TOPIO.
- Deep sea bases (German "Tiefseebasis") are giant cities located under water. They are modern, beautiful and have big windows to allow the people to see fish and other underwater life forms. The Orion usually starts and lands at Basis 104 which is located in the Gulf of Carpentaria, Australia.
- Faster-than-light engine (German "Überlichtantrieb") is the main drive that allows the crew to traverse the universe at speeds faster than light. The Frogs use a similar but superior technology, with the result that their spacecraft can outpace the ships of the Space Patrol.
- Magnet shield (German "Magnetschild") is a protective shield which is used by the Frogs. The Shield appears as a powerful energy bowl that encircles the starship.

== Special effects and set decoration ==
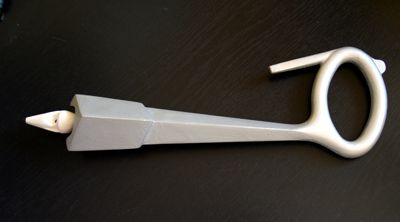
Laser gun "HM-4" as seen in the series

Many of the special effects seen in the black-and-white series, like the underwater casino and space port, were created by means of the Schüfftan process.

As the series' budget was comparatively low, the set designers resorted to using modified common everyday objects; for instance, electric irons, upside-down clock pendulums, washing-machine console parts, and designer pencil sharpeners were used as props control panels, sewing thread coils and banana plugs as futuristic machine parts, and plastic cups as ceiling lights. Many panels were produced by the then-newly invented thermoforming process. Designer furniture was also extensively used, notably Ludwig Mies van der Rohe's 258-type couch, Harry Bertoia's Diamond-type armchair, Yrjö Kukkapuro's Karuselli-type armchair, Charles Eames's Aluminium group #EA105 chair, George Nelson's DAF Chair and Eero Saarinen's Tulpe table/chair combo. Joe Colombo's famous Smoke-type drinking glasses were used throughout the series.

Orion's cockpit was a 2.50m high, 10m wide interior set, built within a 28m exterior diameter sound stage. It stood on a 60 cm high metal tube construction to hide the 10,000m cable harness that connected its 3,200 flashing light bulbs to a 40 kg, electric motor-driven pinned-barrel mechanical sequencer.

The stage designer was Rolf Zehetbauer, who later won an Academy Award for his work on Cabaret.

"We had no money available and yet we were instructed to produce an elaborate science-fiction series. We were forced to improvise in all aspects. This ruled out completely manufacturing the spaceship's equipment from scratch. So we used existing things that we could adapt," is how Zehetbauer described the design work of the set.

== Production ==
Rumours about the considerable costs of the series having led to its termination after only seven episodes were denied by the widow of the Orion's original screenwriter, implying that it was planned from the start to have only seven installments. More episode screenplays were written than were filmed. No official reason was given for not producing a second series of episodes, but there are several reasons that were aired in interviews many years later by those involved in the production. According to Hans Gottschalk, one of the executive producers, there was a "lack of exciting script ideas" at the time. Helmut Jedele, then boss of producers Bavaria Film, mentioned in hindsight that the first series had taken the company to its limits both in terms of staff and finance.

Another factor in planning for a second series would have been filming in colour instead of black-and-white. This would have been required for a successful international marketing of an extension, but West German production companies were not yet prepared for the necessary investment for the new equipment.

West German television premiered colour (PAL) transmissions a year later in 1967, but the switchover from black-and-white took several years.

Yet another impediment might have been that the controllers in charge at the state television channel ARD feared accusations of an excess of "militarism" and a portrayal of a system "akin to fascism". While this might seem far-fetched for foreigners, this issue was and is very sensitive in Germany with regards to the history of the country, and executive producer Helmut Krapp admitted that the issue was considered and taken seriously.

== Co-production with French ORTF Television ==
Originally WDR, headquartered in Cologne, the largest regional broadcasting channel within the ARD public TV consortium, was the sole commissioning producer on behalf of ARD group and in that position to provide complete production funding. However, the planned budget of up to 360,000 DM for each episode was considered too high by the WDR controllers. Bavaria Film chief Helmut Jedele looked for a co-producer to share some of the cost and came to an agreement with French national state TV channel ORTF. They contributed about 20% to production funding and some scenes, notably in episode 5, were re-shot for the French audience using French actors. In France the title of the series was "Commando spatial - Les aventures fantastiques du vaisseau Orion".

== Novelizations ==
145 novels based on and continuing the series were published over the years, often with settings which were considerably different from those seen in the series.

The first issue of novels included stories 1 to 7 of the TV series. It is also noted that the main character has his middle name changed from Allister to Allistair.

The 35 paperback novels span years of the tv series setting (3000 to 3003) as well as stories of the crew's adventures to 3012. Further 111 pulp novels continue the adventures to 3107 (and, briefly, to 3711, to incorporate time travel). The pulp novels also chronicle the early adventures of the crew starting with McLane's graduation from space academy in 2988 (12 years earlier).

The TV series makes several references to the two Galactic or Interplanetary Wars. The First Galactic War (400–500 years before the stories setting) was fought by rebels of the Neptune Colony against the Earth Government. References to this are made in the series episode 5 - Fight for the Sun, where the defeated rebels now live in peace on planet Chroma.

The pulp novelizations also related some of the pre-Raumpatrouille adventures of the older crew members. One reveals that McLane served under General van Dyke's father in the Second Galactic War. McLane also mentions his former military war-time commander, Commodore Ruyther, who is now retired and a minerals transporter captain, in series episode 3 - Guardians of the Law.

== Feature film ==
A movie composed of various scenes from the original series, together with some new footage, debuted in 2003 but did not match the success of the original series. As described by Dietmar Schönherr in an interview, the series had tried to deal with serious issues, a fact appreciated by many of its viewers. The movie's producers tried to replicate the series in trash culture style, however, thereby alienating much of the original fan base. The title of the movie was "Raumpatrouille Orion – Rücksturz ins Kino". The storyline was about the invasion and attacks of the Frogs, the term now becoming an acronym for "Feindliche Raumverbände ohne galaktische Seriennummer" (roughly Hostile Space Combat Units Without Galactic Serial Identification Number). Strangely the English subtitles version indicate that FROGS stands for Foreign Race Of Galactic Scoundrels. Either way, this description, appearing for the first time in the film, contradicts the TV series, where Atan Shubashi and Hasso Sigbjörnson, who were the first humans to see the Frogs on far space outpost MZ4, calling them "Frösche" (German for frogs) first, but later switched to the English translation because "Frösche" sounded too familiar to describe the aliens.

== Soundtrack and introduction ==
The emblematic soundtrack was composed by Peter Thomas.

The voice-over introduction (similar to that used in Star Trek the same year), set both tone and atmosphere of the series.

Voice-over introduction in German:

"Was heute noch wie ein Märchen klingt, kann morgen Wirklichkeit sein. Hier ist ein Märchen von Übermorgen: es gibt keine Nationalstaaten mehr. Es gibt nur noch die Menschheit und ihre Kolonien im Weltraum. Man siedelt auf fernen Sternen. Der Meeresboden ist als Wohnraum erschlossen. Mit heute noch unvorstellbaren Geschwindigkeiten durcheilen Raumschiffe unser Milchstraßensystem. Eins dieser Raumschiffe ist die ORION, winziger Teil eines gigantischen Sicherheitssystems, das die Erde vor Bedrohungen aus dem All schützt. Begleiten wir die ORION und ihre Besatzung bei ihrem Patrouillendienst am Rande der Unendlichkeit."

English translation:

"What may sound like a fairy tale today may be tomorrow's reality. This is a fairy tale from the day after tomorrow: There are no more nations. There is only mankind and its colonies in space. People have settled on faraway stars. The ocean floor has been made habitable. At speed still unimaginable today, space vessels are rushing through our Milky Way. One of these vessels is the ORION, a minuscule part of a gigantic security system protecting the Earth from threats from outer space. Let's accompany the ORION and her crew on their patrol at the edge of infinity."

== Episodes ==
No.	Title	Original release date
1	"Attack from Space" "Angriff aus dem All"	September 17, 1966
On their first mission after being reprimanded and demoted to space patrol service, the crew of the Orion investigate an outpost gone silent and promptly discover a new extraterrestrial threat.
2	"Planet off Course" "Planet außer Kurs"	October 1, 1966
When the Frogs send a rogue planet on a collision course to Earth, only the Orion may be able to stop it.
3	"Keepers of the Law" "Hüter des Gesetzes"	October 15, 1966
The crew of the Orion investigate a mining outpost not responding to calls and discovers a problem with the robotic workforce.
4	"Deserters" "Deserteure"	October 29, 1966
A human commander tries to defect to the Frogs, later saying he doesn't remember the incident. When the Orion is ordered to the sector where it took place, similar things happen to the Orion crew and loyalties are put to the test.
5	"Battle for the Sun" "Kampf um die Sonne"	November 12, 1966
Variations in the sun's energy output threaten the Earth's climate. The Orion crew investigate and discover a long forgotten colony of humanity which may be responsible.
6	"The Space Trap" "Die Raumfalle"	November 26, 1966
The Orion takes aboard a writer looking for inspiration for his next novel, which doesn't make things easier when the crew encounter a colony of outcasts with dangerous ambitions.
7	"Invasion"	December 10, 1966
Unusual behavior by high-ranking intelligence officials makes Commander McLane suspect a conspiracy. No one listens to his warnings until it is too late: the invasion by the Frogs is already underway.

== Sources ==
- Josef Hilger (2003). Raumpatrouille. ISBN 3-89602-334-9
- Jörg Kastner (1995). Raumpatrouille ORION. ISBN 3-910079-53-9
- Jörg Kastner (1991). Das große Raumschiff Orion Fanbuch. ISBN 3-442-23642-8
- Raumpatrouille Orion. Bd.1, Wuppertal 1997, ISBN 3-930646-05-6
