= Doug McKeon =

American actor (born 1966)

- Born: June 10, 1966 (age 60); Pompton Plains, New Jersey, U.S.
- Occupation: Actor
- Years active: 1976–present
- Spouse: Kathy McKeon
- Children: 1

Doug McKeon (born June 10, 1966) is an American actor who began his career as a child actor in the 1970s.

== Early life and career ==
McKeon was born on June 10, 1966, in Pompton Plains, New Jersey, and raised in Oakland, New Jersey, where he attended Indian Hills High School.

McKeon performed in the television series The Edge of Night. He acted in the films Uncle Joe Shannon (for which he was nominated for a Golden Globe Award), On Golden Pond, Night Crossing and Mischief.

== Selected filmography ==
Film and television
Year	Title	Role	Notes
1978	Daddy, I Don’t Like It Like This	Peter	TV film
1978	Uncle Joe Shannon	Robbie	
1979	Big Shamus, Little Shamus	Max Sutter	9 episodes
1979	Centennial	Philip Wendell	TV miniseries
1980	The Comeback Kid	Michael	TV film
1981	On Golden Pond	Billy Ray Jr.	
1982	Night Crossing	Frank Strelzyk	
1982	An Innocent Love	Harry Woodward	TV film
1982	Desperate Lives	Scott Cameron	TV film
1985	Mischief	Jonathan Bellah	
1985	Heart of a Champion: The Ray Mancini Story	Ray 'Boom Boom' Mancini	TV film
1987	At Mother's Request	Marc Schreuder	TV miniseries
1992	Where the Red Fern Grows: Part Two	Billy Coleman	Direct-to-video film
1996	The Empty Mirror	The Typist	
1996	Kounterfeit	Patron	
1998	From the Earth to the Moon	Joe Allen	TV miniseries
2000	Rocket's Red Glare	Flight Surgeon #2	TV film
2001	Critical Mass	Breem	Direct-to-video film
2001	The Boys of Sunset Ridge		Director and writer
2005	Come Away Home	Woodsy Warner	Also director
2015	I Spit on Your Grave III: Vengeance Is Mine	Oscar "Koza" Kosca	
2016	LBJ	Hubert Humphrey	

== Bibliography ==
- Holmstrom, John. The Moving Picture Boy: An International Encyclopaedia from 1895 to 1995. Norwich, Michael Russell, 1996, p. 360.
