= Philippe Nicaud =

French actor (1926–2009)

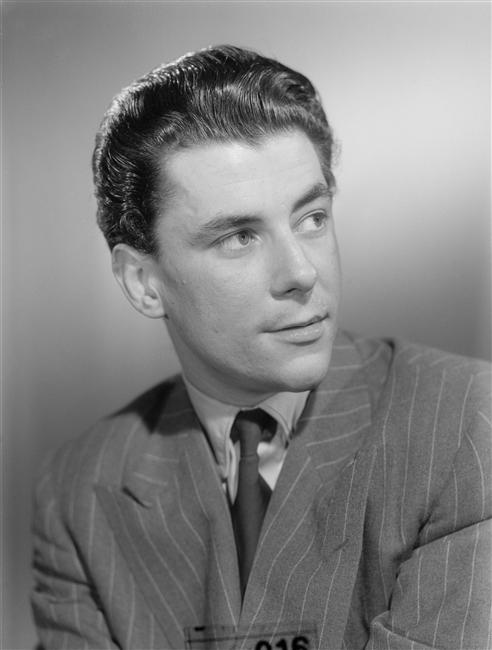
Nicaud in 1951

Philippe Nicaud (27 June 1926 – 19 April 2009) was a French actor and singer. He was married to Christine Carère from 1957 till her death in 2008.

Nicaud appeared in the episode "Jet Trail" of the 1966 American espionage drama television series Blue Light.

== Partial filmography ==
- Monelle (1948) - Jules
- To the Eyes of Memory (1948) - Un élève du cours Simon (uncredited)
- Maya (1949) - Albert
- Miquette (1950) - Robert de Flers
- Murders (1950) - José Annequin
- Ballerina (1950) - Loulou
- The Lovers of Bras-Mort (1951) - Robert Girard
- Farewell Paris (1952) - Mario
- Operation Magali (1953) - Le guitariste
- Fantaisie d'un jour (1955) - François Chaplar
- Spring, Autumn and Love (1955) - Jean Balestra
- Scandal in Montmartre (1955) - Philippe-Gérard Maurisset
- Ce soir les jupons volent (1956) - Bernard le costumier sans compagnie
- Printemps à Paris (1957) - Pierre
- Miss Catastrophe (1957) - Le milliardaire Pierre Leroy
- Les 3 font la paire (1957) - Jojo / Teddy / Partner
- Mademoiselle and Her Gang (1957) - Paul
- Mademoiselle Strip-tease (Striptease de Paris) (1957) - Jacques Bersan
- Back to the Wall (1958) - Yves Normand
- En légitime défense (1958) - Pierre 'Pierrot' Lambert
- Venetian Honeymoon (1959) - Gérard Chevalier
- Come Dance with Me! (1959) - Daniel
- The Gigolo (1960) - Édouard
- Les moutons de Panurge (1961) - Un voisin de table au restaurant (uncredited)
- People in Luck (1963) - Philippe (segment "Le yacht")
- Stranger from Hong-Kong (1963) - L'inspecteur
- Pouic-Pouic (1963) - Simon Guilbaud
- Que personne ne sorte (1964) - L'inspecteur Wens
- The Magnificent Cuckold (1964) - The Doctor
- Désirella (1970) - Philippe de Valmont
- The Lady in the Car with Glasses and a Gun (1970) - Highway Policeman
- La isla misteriosa y el capitán Nemo (1973) - Gédéon Spilett
- Deux grandes filles dans un pyjama (1974) - Jérôme
- Comme une femme (1980) - Jean-Charles
- The Missing Link (1980) - Dragon (French version, voice)
- Le chêne d'Allouville (1981) - Charles Crétois, le député
- Signé Furax (1981) - Le chauffeur du bus détourné
- Tais-toi quand tu parles! (1981) - Jeff
- Chanel Solitaire (1981) - Gabrielle's Father
- Mon Curé Chez les Nudistes (1982) - Léon
- Le corbillard de Jules (1982) - Le lieutenant P.D.
- Plus beau que moi, tu meurs (1982) - Le vicomte
- Johann Strauss: The King Without a Crown (1987) - Jacques Offenbach
