= Eighteen Hour Stopover =

1955 film

- Directed by: René Jolivet
- Written by: René Jolivet
- Produced by: Raymond Logeart
- Starring: Jean-Pierre Aumont; Geneviève Kervine; Georges Marchal
- Cinematography: Roger Fellous
- Edited by: Léonide Azar
- Music by: Marc Lanjean; Daniel Lesur
- Production company: Vascos Films
- Distributed by: Mondial Films
- Release date: 27 May 1955
- Running time: 89 minutes
- Country: France
- Language: French

Eighteen Hour Stopover (French: Dix-huit heures d'escale) is a 1955 French crime film directed by René Jolivet and starring Jean-Pierre Aumont, Geneviève Kervine and Georges Marchal. The film's sets were designed by the art director Robert Hubert.

== Cast ==
- Jean-Pierre Aumont as Robert Vitrac
- Geneviève Kervine as Nicole Dumaine
- Georges Marchal as L'inspecteur Bério
- Maria Mauban as Manuela Cortez
- Georges Poujouly as Le gamin avec le capitaine
- Jean-Jacques Lécot as Mario
- Henri San Juan as Pablo Gonzales
- Jany Vallières as Lolita
- Luc Andrieux as Le barman
- Jacques Muller as Aurélien
- Guy Moulinet as Zamba
- Paul Faivre as Le docteur
- Noëlle Norman as Mme. Bério
- Gaston Rey as Berger

== Bibliography ==
- Rège, Philippe. Encyclopedia of French Film Directors, Volume 1. Scarecrow Press, 2009.
