= Coux-et-Bigaroque-Mouzens =

- Commune
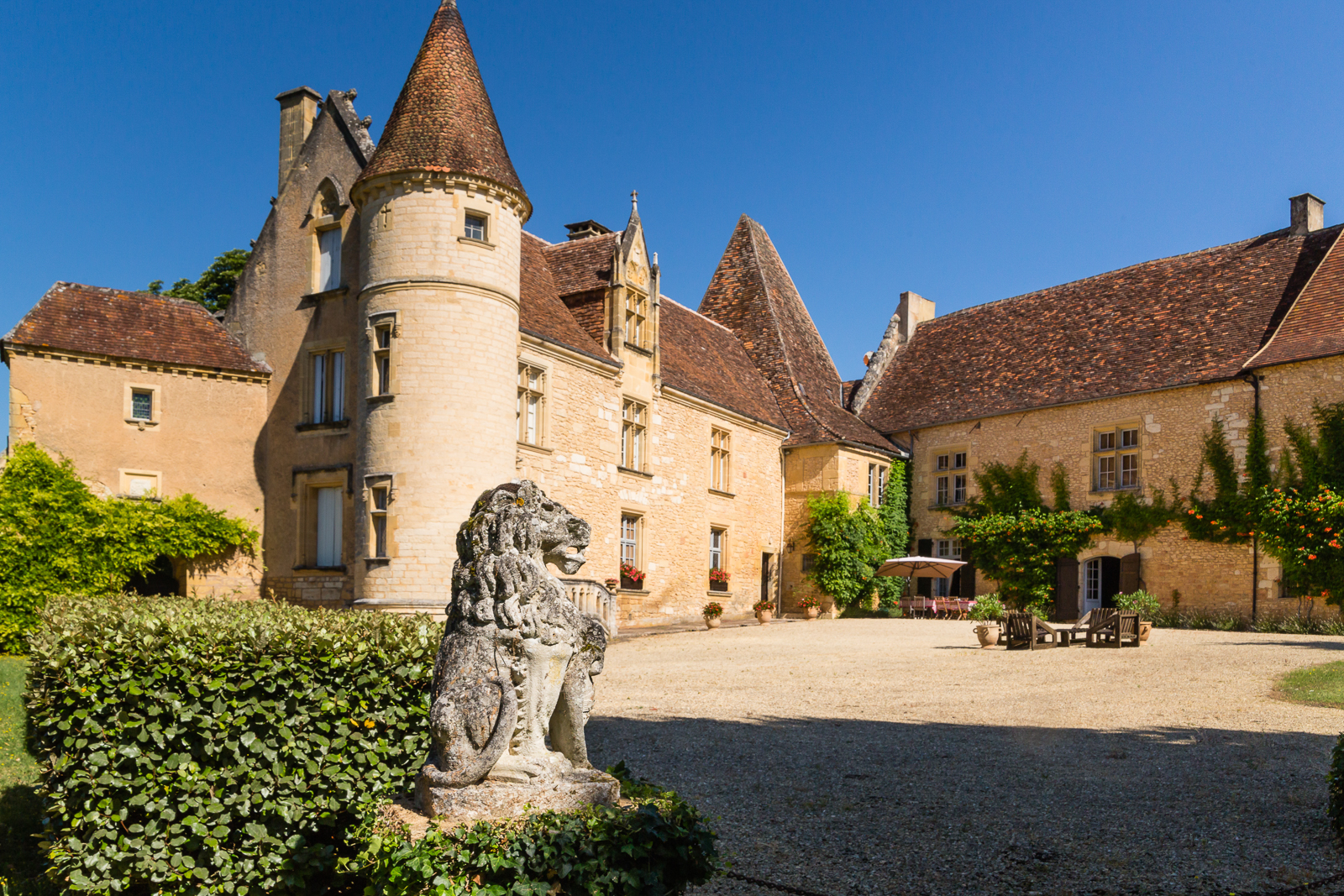
- The chateau of Monsec in Mouzens
- Location of Coux-et-Bigaroque-Mouzens
- Location within France Location within Nouvelle-Aquitaine
- Coordinates: 44°49′59″N 0°58′23″E
- Country: France
- Region: Nouvelle-Aquitaine
- Department: Dordogne
- Arrondissement: Sarlat-la-Canéda
- Canton: Vallée Dordogne

Government
  - Mayor (2020–2026): Jean-Louis Chazelas
- Area^{1}: 27.47 km^{2} (10.61 sq mi)
- Population (2023): 1,244
  - Density: 45.29/km^{2} (117.3/sq mi)
- Time zone: UTC+01:00 (CET)
  - Summer (DST): UTC+02:00 (CEST)
- INSEE/Postal code: 24142 /24220
- ^{1} French Land Register data, which excludes lakes, ponds, glaciers > 1 km^{2} (0.386 sq mi or 247 acres) and river estuaries.

Coux-et-Bigaroque-Mouzens is a commune in the Dordogne department of southwestern France. The municipality was established on 1 January 2016 and consists of the former communes of Coux-et-Bigaroque and Mouzens.

== See also ==
- Communes of the Dordogne department
