= I Deal in Danger =

1966 film directed by Walter Grauman

- Directed by: Walter Grauman
- Written by: Larry Cohen
- Produced by: Buck Houghton
- Starring: Robert Goulet; Christine Carère
- Cinematography: Sam Leavitt; Kurt Grigoleit
- Edited by: Jason Bernie; Dolf Rudeen
- Music by: Lalo Schifrin; Joseph Mullendore
- Production companies: Rogo Productions; 20th Century Fox Television
- Distributed by: 20th Century Fox
- Release date: 1966
- Running time: 89 mins
- Country: United States
- Language: English

I Deal in Danger is a 1966 American DeLuxe Color spy film compiled from the first four episodes of a television series, Blue Light, which aired on ABC-TV in early 1966. Directed by Walter Grauman, it starred Robert Goulet as David March, an Allied spy in Nazi Germany during World War II. He is aided by a French agent, Susanne Duchard, played by Christine Carère.

== Plot ==
In Nazi Germany during World War II, David March (Robert Goulet) is an American traitor who has been given wide access to travel as he wishes within Germany. Unbeknownst to the Germans, March is actually an American spy, the last remaining from a spy ring, known as Blue Light. As time goes on, he has been able to work his way higher and higher within the Nazi intelligence apparatus, however he is suspected by a Nazi Gestapo officer, Captain Elm (Werner Peters). Along the way, he meets Susanne Duchard (Christine Carère), a French agent, with whom he has a romantic interlude and persuades her to help him.

Elm fosters a plan to expose March by taking him to Spain to meet with a British scientist, Guy Spauling (Donald Harron), who wants to defect to Germany. Elm knows that Spauling is a British agent. Spauling asks March to kill him, in order to validate March's standing with the Gestapo, but March instead uses the opportunity to frame Elm as the Blue Light agent, and kills him.

March's goal becomes the destruction of secret Nazi weapons factory, which produces missiles for U-boats. He has romantic interludes with a German scientist, Gretchen Hoffmann (Eva Pflug), working at the missile factory, convincing her to assist in his plans to blow up the facility. March and Duchard escape the destruction of the plant, but Hoffman dies in the explosion.

== Cast ==
The cast list:

- Robert Goulet as David March
- Christine Carère as Suzanne Duchard
- Donald Harron as Spauling
- Horst Frank as Luber
- Werner Peters as Elm
- Eva Pflug as Gretchen Hoffmann
- Christiane Schmidtmer as Ericka von Lindendorf
- John Van Dreelen as Von Lindendorf
- Hans Reiser as Richter
- Margit Saad as The Baroness
- Peter Capell as Eckhardt
- Osman Ragheb as Brunner
- John Alderson as Gorleck
- Dieter Eppler as Stolnitz
- Dieter Kirchlechner as Becker
- Manfred Andrea as Dr. Zimmer
- Alexander Allerson as Draus
- Paul Glawion as the submarine pilot

== See also ==
- List of American films of 1966
