= The Adventures of Gil Blas =

1956 film

- Spanish poster
- Directed by: René Jolivet; Ricardo Muñoz Suay
- Written by: Jesús María de Arozamena; René Jolivet
- Based on: Gil Blas by Alain-René Lesage
- Produced by: Benito Perojo; Jean Lefait; Raymond Logeart
- Starring: Georges Marchal; Barbara Laage; Susana Canales
- Cinematography: Antonio L. Ballesteros; Roger Fellous
- Edited by: André Gaudier; Antonio Ramírez de Loaysa
- Music by: Augusto Algueró; Daniel Lesur
- Production companies: Vascos Films; Producciones Benito Perojo
- Distributed by: Les Films Fernand Rivers; CEA Distribución
- Release date: 6 April 1956
- Running time: 95 minutes
- Countries: France; Spain
- Language: French

The Adventures of Gil Blas (French: Les Aventures de Gil Blas de Santillane, Spanish: Una aventura de Gil Blas) is a 1956 French–Spanish adventure film directed by René Jolivet and Ricardo Muñoz Suay and starring Georges Marchal, Barbara Laage and Susana Canales. It is based on the eighteenth century novel Gil Blas by Alain-René Lesage.

The film's sets were designed by the art directors Sigfrido Burmann and René Hubert.

== Cast ==
- Georges Marchal as Gil Blas de Santillane
- Barbara Laage as Antonia Caldera
- Susana Canales as Doña Caldera Mencia
- Jacques Castelot as Marquis de Mosquera
- Marthe Mercadier as Serafina
- Antonio Riquelme as Dr. Sangrado
- Georgette Anys as Maria
- Jean Lefebvre as Scipion
- Claude May as Camille
- Fernando Rey as Capitaine Rolando
- Claire Maurier as Paquita
- Carlos Larrañaga as Le Prince
- Alexandre Rignault as L'aubergiste
- Paul Demange as Lamela
- Paul Préboist as Un homme de l'escorte

== Bibliography ==
- Goble, Alan. The Complete Index to Literary Sources in Film. Walter de Gruyter, 1999.
- Klossner, Michael. The Europe of 1500-1815 on Film and Television: A Worldwide Filmography of Over 2550 Works, 1895 Through 2000. McFarland & Company, 2002.
