= René Jolivet =

French screenwriter and film director

- Born: 28 December 1898; Albertville, Savoie, France
- Died: 27 February 1975 (aged 76); Bandol, Var, France
- Occupations: Writer, Director
- Years active: 1938–1970 (film)

René Jolivet (1898–1975) was a French screenwriter and film director. He co-directed the 1956 adventure film The Adventures of Gil Blas.

== Selected filmography ==
- Women's Prison (1938)
- Angelica (1939)
- Midnight Tradition (1939)
- Death No Longer Awaits (1944)
- On demande un ménage (1946)
- The Fugitive (1947)
- False Identity (1947)
- Night Express (1948)
- Le sorcier du ciel (1949)
- Thus Finishes the Night (1949)
- La peau d'un homme (1951)
- L'étrange amazone (1953)
- Eighteen Hour Stopover (1955)
- The Adventures of Gil Blas (1956)
- A Certain Monsieur Jo (1958)
- Les mordus (1960)

== Bibliography ==
- Crisp, Colin. French Cinema—A Critical Filmography: Volume 1, 1929–1939. Indiana University Press, 2015.
- Klossner, Michael. The Europe of 1500-1815 on Film and Television: A Worldwide Filmography of Over 2550 Works, 1895 Through 2000. McFarland & Company, 2002.
