= Eva Pflug =

German actress (1929–2008)

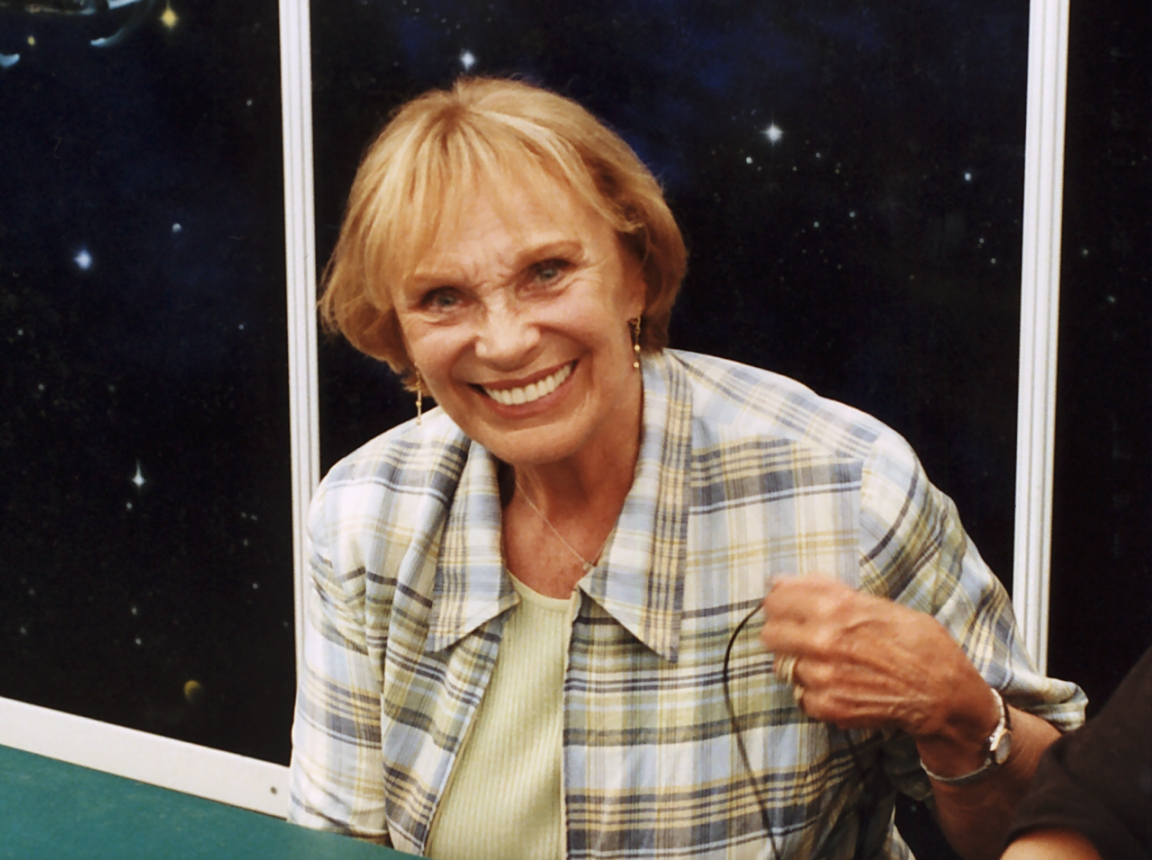
Eva Pflug, 2000

Eva Pflug (12 June 1929 – 5 August 2008) was a German film and television actress, as well as a voice actress. Born in Leipzig, she was well known for her work on the first German science fiction television series, Raumpatrouille Orion, during the 1960s.

== Life ==
Eva Pflug was born on 12 June 1929 in Leipzig. After her first film, The Council of the Gods (1950), she worked in Helmut Käutner's Schinderhannes with Curd Jürgens. In the first Edgar-Wallace film Der Frosch mit der Maske (1959), she had a small part as a night club singer. Three years later, Pflug was to be seen in the Francis Durbridge cliffhanger Das Halstuch (1962). After that, she contributed to Tim Frazer (1964) and Wie ein Blitz. Her first major part on a TV series was that of secretary Steffi in Slim Callaghan Intervenes alongside Viktor de Kowa.

In early 1966, Pflug appeared as the naïve scientist Dr. Gretchen Hoffman in three episodes of the American television espionage series Blue Light; these were among four Blue Light episodes later edited together to create the American 1966 theatrical film I Deal in Danger, which included her role. After guest roles in the TV series Die fünfte Kolonne and Das Kriminalmuseum, Pflug was offered the role which made her career: Tamara Jagellovsk in the first German science-fiction TV series, Raumpatrouille Orion, in 1966. As Jagellovsk, she would become an icon of feminism.

After her role in Raumpatrouille, Pflug sporadically appeared in various television roles, such as in Graf Yoster gibt sich die Ehre, Dem Täter auf der Spur, and Ein Fall für zwei. Pflug started accepting more engagements; she travelled to Basel, München, Köln, Frankfurt, and Berlin, and festivals in Heppenheim, Jagsthausen, and Ettlingen.

This time, she played in more 'classical' main roles, among them Goethe's Gretchen in Faust and Martha in Kleist's Der zerbrochene Krug. For her role in Brecht's Mutter Courage in 1986, she was given the grand prize in the Bad Hersfelder Festival. Furthermore, she played Shaw's Die heilige Johanna, and Shakespeare's A Midsummer Night's Dream.

Between 1980 and 1985, she appeared about 700 times on stage in popular comedies alongside Paul Hubschmid.

As a voice actress she dubbed Julie Christie (Dr. Zhivago), Ursula Andress (Casino Royale), Anne Bancroft (The Graduate), Eva Marie Saint (North by Northwest) and Susan Flannery (The Bold and the Beautiful).

Pflug died on 5 August 2008 at her home in Grünwald, Bavaria.

== Selected filmography ==
- Third from the Right (1950), as Hilde
- Der Schinderhannes (1958), as Schäfer-Ammi
- Confess, Doctor Corda (1958), as Gabriele Montag
- Der Frosch mit der Maske (1959), as Lolita
- Man on a String (1960), as Tanja Rosnova
- Girl from Hong Kong (1961), as Gudrun
- Das Halstuch (1962, TV miniseries), as Diana Winston
- Tim Frazer (1964, TV miniseries), as Vivien Gilmore
- I Deal in Danger (1966), as Dr. Gretchen Hoffman
- Raumpatrouille Orion (1966, TV series), as Lt. Tamara Jagellovsk
- Dead Run (1967), as Lili Manchingen
- Kiedy miłość była zbrodnią (1967), as Inga
- Wie ein Blitz (1970, TV miniseries), as Emely Brown
- Only the Wind Knows the Answer (1974), as Karin Lucas
- Oh, This Father (1978-1981, TV series) as Eva
- Curse This House (2004, TV film) as Adele Pemberton
- Rose unter Dornen (2006, TV film) as Margarethe Wahlberg
