= Blue Light (TV series) =

1966 American dramatic television series

- Genre: Espionage drama
- Created by: Walter Grauman; Larry Cohen
- Written by: Larry Cohen; Merwin Bloch; Walter Brough; Dick Carr; Jamie Farr; Harold Livingston; H. Bud Otto; Brad Radnitz; Curtis Sanders; Donald S. Sanford; Roger Swaybill; Jack Turley; Dan Ullman
- Directed by: Robert Butler; James Goldstone; Walter Grauman; Gerd Oswald; Leo Penn
- Starring: Robert Goulet; Christine Carère
- Theme music composer: Lalo Schifrin
- Composers: Lalo Schifrin; Dave Grusin; Joseph Mullendore; Pete Rugolo
- Country of origin: United States
- Original language: English
- No. of seasons: 1
- No. of episodes: 17

Production
- Producer: Buck Houghton
- Running time: 30 minutes
- Production companies: Rogo Productions; 20th Century-Fox Television

Original release
- Network: ABC
- Release: January 12 – May 18, 1966

Blue Light is a 1966 American espionage drama television series starring Robert Goulet and Christine Carère about the adventures of an American double agent in Nazi Germany during World War II. It aired from January 12 to May 18, 1966. (Reruns continued until August 31, 1966).

A theatrical movie, I Deal in Danger, was created by editing Blue Light's first four episodes together into a continuous story. I Deal in Danger was released in 1966 after Blue Light's cancellation.

== Synopsis ==
Christine Carère as Suzanne Duchard and Robert Goulet as David March in Blue Light

Prior to Nazi Germany's conquest of Europe, the United States places 18 sleeper agents inside Germany, collectively forming an espionage organization called "Code: Blue Light", assigned to penetrate German high command during World War II. Journalist David March is one of them. He presents himself to the Germans as a foreign correspondent who officially renounced his American citizenship and is in Germany to support the Nazis. He is put to work as a writer and broadcaster of Nazi propaganda and occasionally as a spy for Germany. The Germans catch and execute the other 17 Blue Light agents, leaving March the lone survivor. So deep is his cover that except for a few American officials aware of his mission, the world believes him a pro-Nazi traitor, so much so that the woman he loves commits suicide because of his support for Nazism. He must also avoid capture or assassination by Allied intelligence agencies unaware that he in fact works for the Allies.

His confidante, assistant, and contact with the French underground is Suzanne Duchard, herself a double agent posing as a Gestapo officer who hates March. She knows he is a double agent and supports his espionage activities while falling in love with him.

March sees a lot of action and faces moral dilemmas, often choosing between carrying out orders and protecting innocent people. He often kills in order to maintain his cover or to fulfil a mission.

== Cast ==
- Robert Goulet as David March
- Christine Carère as Suzanne Duchard

== Production ==
Except for its first episode, Blue Light was filmed entirely at Bavarian Studios in Munich, West Germany – according to Goulet, the first American television show filmed in color in Europe.

Following the cancellation of Blue Light, its first four episodes, which told a continuous story, were edited together to create a movie. Entitled I Deal in Danger, it was released theatrically in the United States in December 1966 and in other countries in 1967 and 1968.

== Episodes ==
No.	Title	Directed by	Written by	Original release date
1	"The Last Man"	Walter Grauman	Larry Cohen	January 12, 1966
The Germans have become aware of Blue Light and have captured and executed 17 of the 18 Blue Light spies operating in Germany. German Gestapo Captain Elm suspects that March is the last surviving Blue Light agent and sets out to expose him. The Allies, meanwhile, have discovered a new German super-weapon program located at Grossmuchen, Germany. March is the only Allied agent with a chance at gaining access to the new weapon, and Allied intelligence must counter Elm's efforts by convincing the Germans that March is a loyal Nazi. Eventually, the tables are turned, March frames Elm, and the Germans are convinced that Elm is the traitor. Werner Peters, Donald Harron, John van Dreelen, Christine Schmidtmer, Oscar Beregi, Jr., Terence Vliet, and John Alderson guest star.
2	"Target David March"	Unknown	Unknown	January 19, 1966
Although Elm is in prison, March still must convince some key Nazis that he is loyal to them before he can get access to the weapon program at Grossmuchen. Meanwhile, unaware that March is a double agent and believing him to be a traitor to the Allies, British intelligence sends three commandos into Germany to kill him. Eva Pflug, Hans Reiser, Margit Saad, Peter Capell, Geoffrey Frederick, Edward Binns, and Alan Cuthbertson guest star.
3	"The Fortress Below"	Unknown	Unknown	January 26, 1966
March finally gets access to the weapon program at Grossmuchen, but the facility is 200 feet (61 meters) underground, difficult to sneak into and out of, and impossible for March to get weapons into. The Allies want a German scientist imprisoned in Berlin, Dr. Gretchen Hoffman, to be freed so that she can help March destroy the Grossmuchen facility, and March maps out a plan to get her out of prison. Eva Pflug, Peter Capell, John van Dreelen, Osman Ragheb, Manfred Andrae, Alexander Allerson, Paul Glawton, and Dieter Kirchlechner guest star.
4	"The Weapon Within"	Unknown	Unknown	February 2, 1966
March has freed the naive Dr. Hoffman from prison and now must rely on her help to destroy the Grossmuchen facility. Hoffman becomes romantically involved with March, but has second thoughts about helping him when she realizes that her friends at Grossmuchen will be killed if the facility is blown up. Ultimately, she does help him, and is herself killed in the explosion. Eva Pflug and Horst Frank guest star.
5	"Traitor's Blood"	Walter Grauman	Larry Cohen	February 9, 1966
March's younger brother Brian, who has lied about his age in order to join the United States Army and prove he is not a traitor to the United States like his brother, has been captured and is being held in a German prisoner-of-war camp. Suspecting that David March is a traitor to Germany, the Germans test his loyalty by ordering him to visit the imprisoned Brian – and kill him. To resolve David's dilemma, he and Suzanne engineer Brian's escape from the prisoner-of-war camp. David Macklin, Henry Beckman, Lyle Bettger, and Jerry Ayres guest star.
6	"Agent of the East"	Unknown	Unknown	February 16, 1966
March receives orders to rescue a Soviet spy captured by the Gestapo before he gives up plans for a heavy water plant to the Germans. Jan Malmsjö, James Mitchell, Dick Davalos, and Mike Stroka guest star.
7	"Sacrifice!"	Unknown	Unknown	February 23, 1966
The Germans want March to get a captured All-American hero to talk, so he joins two SS officers in interrogating the American in a Gestapo building. While they are there, Allied aircraft bomb the building, and March, the American hero, and the two SS officers are trapped underground with no apparent hope of rescue. Larry Pennell and Richard Bull guest star.
8	"The Secret War"	Unknown	Unknown	March 2, 1966
Two Soviet agents who knew the Soviet spy March had targeted in the "Agent of the East" episode threaten to expose March and Suzanne to the Germans unless he agrees to work for the Soviet Union rather than the United States. Kevin Hagen, Gail Kobe, Roger C. Carmel, and Gilbert Green guest star.
9	"Invasion by the Stars"	Gerd Oswald	Story by : Curtis Sanders; Teleplay by : Jack Turley	March 9, 1966
In order to delay Operation Sea Lion – the planned German invasion of England – March tries to exploit Adolf Hitler's interest in astrology by convincing Hitler's astrologer to tell Hitler that he should postpone the invasion. Francis Lederer, Jason Wingreen, Curt Lowens, Charles Hradiac, and Peter Hellman guest star.
10	"The Return of Elm"	Robert Butler	Larry Cohen	March 23, 1966
Disgraced Gestapo Captain Elm, whom March had framed as a traitor to Germany in the first episode of the show, escapes from a British prisoner-of-war camp, intent on exposing March as a double agent, killing him, and clearing his own name. Werner Peters, Malachi Throne, and Lawrence Montaigne guest star.
11	"Jet Trail"	Unknown	Unknown	April 6, 1966
March poses as an Office of Strategic Services officer to assist the French Resistance in recovering a top-secret jet engine from an experimental German airplane that has crashed. Lamont Johnson and Philippe Nicaud guest star.
12	"How to Kill a Toy Soldier"	Leo Penn	Merwin Bloch & Roger E. Swaybill	April 13, 1966
An 11-year-old member of the Hitler Youth sees March kill a German courier in order to steal the plans for every German rocket launching site in Norway. March faces a choice between killing the boy or letting him expose March to the Germans as a double agent. Greg Mullavy, Dan Frazer, Michael Shea, and Donald Losby guest star.
13	"The Deserters"	Unknown	Unknown	April 20, 1966
Posing as American soldiers, March and a Gestapo agent infiltrate Allied lines in Italy. March's mission is to discover upcoming Allied battle plans for the Italian front, and the Gestapo agent's job is to keep an eye on March. Ken Lynch, James Davidson, George Backman, and Tim O'Kelley guest star.
14	"The Other Fuhrer"	Unknown	Unknown	April 27, 1966
A German aristocrat plots to overthrow Adolf Hitler by replacing the real Hitler with a double. After the Germans capture and execute the Allied agent sent to meet the aristocrat, the Gestapo orders March to take the dead Allied agent's place and trap the aristocrat. David Sheiner guest stars.
15	"The Key to the Code"	Unknown	Unknown	May 4, 1966
Visiting France to broadcast a Nazi radio program, March and Suzanne discover that the Germans have laid a trap for an upcoming Allied commando raid. The Germans have broken the code used by the French Resistance, making it impossible for March and Suzanne to warn the Allies without putting themselves at risk of exposure, and they must figure out how to keep the Germans from interfering with the raid. Hans Gudegast (Eric Braeden), Arthur Batanides, and Erik Holland guest star.
16	"Field of Dishonor"	James Goldstone	Jamie Farr & H. Bud Otto	May 11, 1966
While publicly attacking a German general who has always been suspicious of March's loyalties but wants to defect to the Allies, March secretly tries to help the man escape Germany. Hal Bokar, Steve Ihnat, James Frawley, Harry Basch, and Fred Stromsoe guest star.
17	"The Friendly Enemy"	Unknown	Unknown	May 18, 1966
A German physicist is close to developing a working atomic bomb, and March is assigned to kill him before he succeeds. Mark Richman and Robert Doyle guest star.

== Broadcast history ==
Blue Light premiered on ABC on January 12, 1966. It was cancelled after the broadcast of its seventeenth episode on May 18, 1966. Reruns of the show continued to air in its regular time slot until August 31, 1966. It aired on Wednesday at 8:30 p.m. throughout its run.

== Critical reception ==
Blue Light was violent by the standards of television in the mid-1960s; in situations where other television heroes knocked out guards and other opponents, March knifed them to death. It was credited for its gritty depiction of espionage in World War II and for the difficult moral choices it posed. Best known as a singer rather than an actor, Goulet received good reviews for his believable portrayal of March, and the show was fast-paced, with tight plots that kept moving. It also featured some of the best television character actors of the 1960s as its guest stars. Carère, however, was viewed as a liability for the show, especially in the romantic subplot between her character and Goulet's. The show's 30-minute format also worked against it, forcing episode writers to meet time constraints in part by making David March's opponents shallow as characters and too easy for him to outwit.
