= The Richard Boone Show =

American TV anthology series (1963–1964)

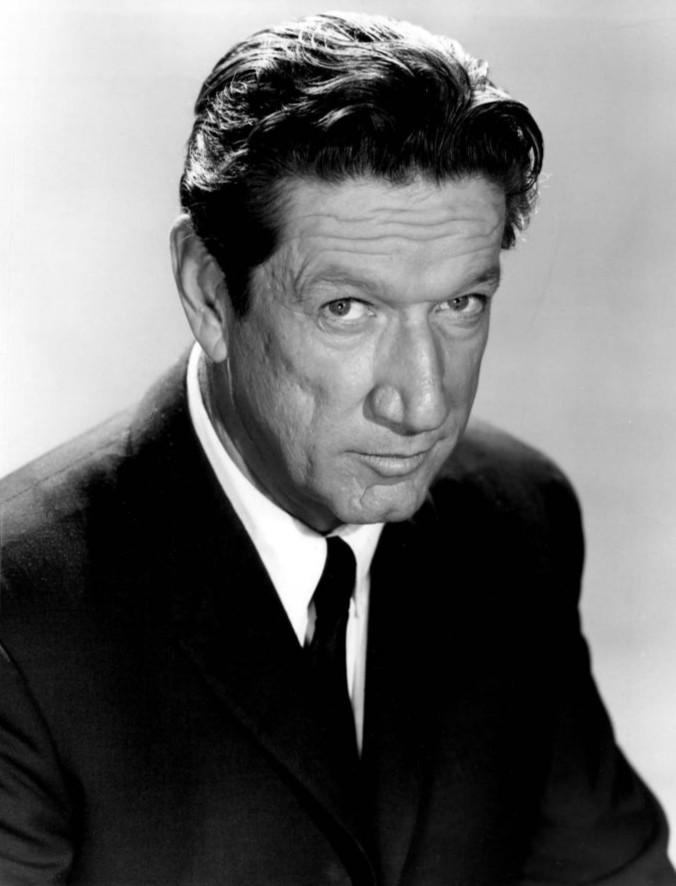
- Genre: Anthology
- Written by: Reuben Bercovitch; Harry Julian Fink; William D. Gordon; John Haase; J.R. Littlefield; Joel Madison; E. Jack Neuman; Clifford Odets; Dale Wasserman; Bob Wehling
- Directed by: Richard Boone; Robert Butler; Robert Gist; Lamont Johnson; Buzz Kulik; Harry Morgan
- Presented by: Richard Boone
- Theme music composer: Henry Mancini
- Country of origin: United States
- Original language: English
- No. of seasons: 1
- No. of episodes: 25

Production
- Executive producers: Mark Goodson; Bill Todman
- Producer: Buck Houghton
- Running time: 60 mins.
- Production company: Mark Goodson-Bill Todman Productions

Original release
- Network: NBC
- Release: September 24, 1963 – March 31, 1964

The Richard Boone Show is an anthology television series. It aired on NBC from September 24, 1963 until September 15, 1964. It was broadcast on Tuesdays from 9 to 10 p.m. Eastern Time.

== Synopsis ==
Richard Boone hosted the series and starred in about half of the episodes, garnering an Emmy nomination for himself and a Golden Globe award for the show. His repertory company of 15 actors included up-and-comers such as Guy Stockwell and Robert Blake as well as such established performers as Bethel Leslie, Jeanette Nolan (both of whom likewise received 1964 Emmy nominations), Warren Stevens and Harry Morgan. They rotated parts freely; each appeared in most episodes, and each starred in at least one.

A Goodson-Todman production, the series boasted Clifford Odets among its regular writers, and Buck Houghton produced.

Programmed against the CBS sitcom, Petticoat Junction, Boone's anthology show was unable to find or keep an audience. It was cancelled after only one season, and has not been syndicated or released on home video, except for a brief showing on the Global Television Network in Canada in the late 1980s.

The show's theme tune, "How Soon" by Henry Mancini, was released as a single in the United Kingdom by RCA Victor in August 1964; and peaked at no lower than Number 10 in the UK Singles Chart. (Note: After sitting at Number 12 on Billboard's "Hits of the World" UK list for two weeks, "How Soon" appears in the November 4, 1964 list just below the Number 9 entry, the Hollies' "We're Through." However, Mancini's tune is also labeled "Number 9". As there is no accompanying explanation, it remains unclear whether this reflects a perceived tie between the two or is simply a typo on Billboard's part.)

== Repertory cast ==
Richard Boone	25 episodes
Jeanette Nolan	25 episodes
Warren Stevens	16 episodes
Bethel Leslie	15 episodes
Harry Morgan	15 episodes
Ford Rainey	14 episodes
Guy Stockwell	14 episodes
Lloyd Bochner	13 episodes
Laura Devon	11 episodes
Robert Blake	10 episodes
June Harding	9 episodes
