= John Alderson (actor) =

English actor (1916–2006)

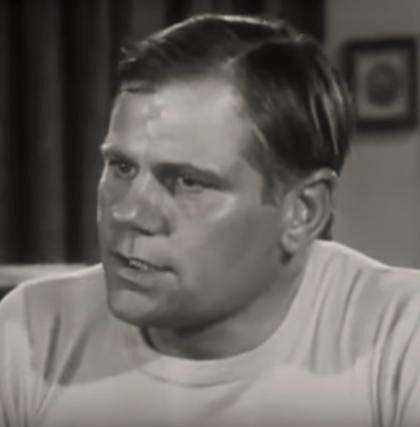
- Alderson in a shot from the 1955 series Medic
- Born: John Bramwell Alderson; 10 April 1916; Horden, County Durham, England
- Died: 4 August 2006 (aged 90); Woodland Hills, Los Angeles, California, U.S.
- Occupation: Actor
- Years active: 1951–1990
- Television: Boots and Saddles

John Bramwell Alderson (10 April 1916 – 4 August 2006) was an English actor noted for playing the lead in the 1957–58 syndicated western television series, Boots and Saddles, which ran for thirty-eight episodes in a single season, and many supporting roles in films in a career spanning almost forty years, from 1951 to 1990.

Alderson was cast as the rugged trail guide Hugh Glass, an historical figure, in the 1966 episode "Hugh Glass Meets the Bear" of the syndicated series, Death Valley Days. Others in the episode were Morgan Woodward as Thomas Fitzpatrick, Victor French as Louis Baptiste and Tris Coffin.

== Biography ==
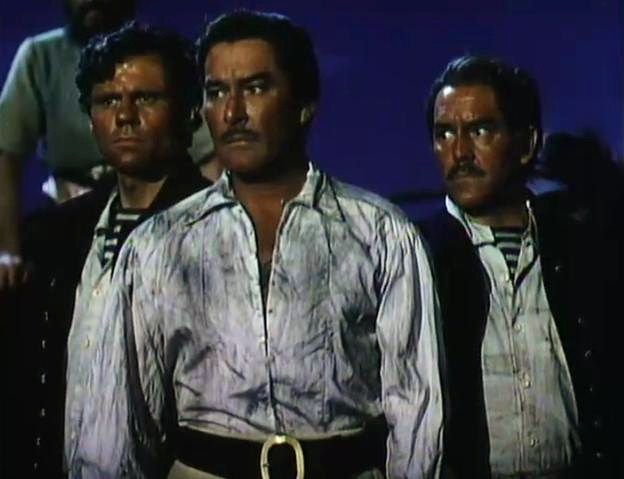
L-R: John Alderson, Errol Flynn and Phil Tully in Against All Flags (1952)

Alderson was born to a mining family in the village of Horden, County Durham, England. After a brief teenage career at the colliery he opted to instead join the Royal Artillery, rising to the rank of Major. Upon leaving the services he married a United States citizen and immigrated to the US, where he began his acting career.

== Filmography ==
=== Film ===
Year	Title	Role	Notes
1951	The Highwayman	British Soldier	Uncredited
1951	The Desert Fox: The Story of Rommel	German Sergeant / Hospital Staffer	Uncredited
1952	Plymouth Adventure	Salterne	Uncredited
1952	Against All Flags	Jonathan Harris	
1953	The Desert Rats	Corporal	Uncredited
1953	Julius Caesar	Citizen of Rome	Uncredited
1953	South Sea Woman	Fitzroy – Baritone	
1954	Knock on Wood	English Bobby	Uncredited
1954	Casanova's Big Night	Outside Guard	Uncredited
1954	Living It Up	Yankee Catcher	Uncredited
1954	King Richard and the Crusaders	Mob Leader	Uncredited
1955	Violent Saturday	Amish Farmer on Train	Uncredited
1955	Moonfleet	Greening	
1955	The Scarlet Coat	Mr. Durkin	
1955	To Catch a Thief	Detective at the Costume Ball	Uncredited
1955	Target Zero	Corporal Devon Enoch	
1957	Spoilers of the Forest	Big Jack Milna	
1957	Shoot-Out at Medicine Bend	Clyde Walters	
1957	Something of Value	Policeman	Uncredited
1957	The Last Stagecoach West	Angus MacKendrick	
1957	Don't Go Near the Water	Lieutenant Commander Diplock	
1958	The Young Lions	Corporal Kraus	Uncredited
1958	Wolf Larsen	Johnson	
1959	No Name on the Bullet	Chaffee	
1960	The Barbarians	Carthaginean Officer	
1961	Romanoff and Juliet	Randle Wix	
1963	The Hook	Crewman Svenson	
1963	Donovan's Reef	Officer	Uncredited
1963	Cleopatra	Roman Officer	Uncredited
1964	My Fair Lady	Jamie – Doolittle's crony	Uncredited
1965	Strange Bedfellows	Truck Driver	Uncredited
1965	The War Lord	Holbracht	
1966	I Deal in Danger	Gorleck	
1967	Double Trouble	Iceman	
1968	Hellfighters	Jim Hatch	
1970	The Molly Maguires	Jenkins	
1970	You Can't Win 'Em All	U.S. Army Major	
1971	The Deserter	O'Toole	
1972	Top of the Heap	Captain Walsh	
1972	Fear Is the Key	Tanner	Uncredited
1974	Blazing Saddles	Gum Chewer	Uncredited
1974	The Klansman	Vernon Hodo	
1976	The Duchess and the Dirtwater Fox	Trent	
1977	Valentino	Cop	
1977	Candleshoe	Jenkins	
1978	The Cat from Outer Space	Mr. Smith	
1978	The Wild Geese	Randy	
1979	Sunnyside	Jack Flynn	
1981	Ragtime	Waldo's Aide No. 1	
1982	Evil Under the Sun	Police Sergeant	
1986	The American Way	Colonel Sanders	
1987	The Beiderbecke Tapes	Tracy	
1990	Young Guns II	Guano Miner	(final film role)

=== Selected television appearances ===
- Gunsmoke (1955) – Nash
- Alfred Hitchcock Presents (1956) (Season 1 Episode 31: "The Gentleman From America") – Attendant
- Alfred Hitchcock Presents (1958) (Season 3 Episode 34: "The Crocodile Case") – Inspector Karsiak
- Walt Disney's Wonderful World of Color (1958–1959, Episodes: "The Swamp Fox" and "Texas John Slaughter") – Sergeant Duncan MacGregor / Sergeant McDonald
- Yancy Derringer (1958) – Marble Fingers
- Black Saddle (1959) – Big Sam Davis
- Lawman (1959) – Jack Brace
- Border Patrol (1959) – Curley
- Colt .45 (1959) – Captain
- Hudson's Bay (1959) – Boggs
- Adventures in Paradise (1960–1961) – Sean Casey / Darcy / Palsson / Harry Pine
- Follow the Sun (1961) – Mervin Taggert
- Have Gun – Will Travel (1958–1962) – Rusty Doggett / Max Clay
- Maverick (1959–1962) – Simon Girty / Captain Bly / Zindler / Ben Chapman
- Tales of Wells Fargo (1960–1962) – Gage / Clay Arvin
- Bronco (1962) – Francis Randolph
- Going My Way (1963) – Mr. Larkin
- Gunsmoke (1955–1963) – Canby / Ab Laster / Nash
- Arrest and Trial (1963) – Bartender
- The Alfred Hitchcock Hour (1964) (Season 2 Episode 18: "Final Escape") – The 3rd Guard
- Combat! (1964) – (Season 2 Episodes 25 & 26: What Are the Bugles Blowing For Parts 1 and 2) Sergeant Rawlings
- The Rogues (1965) – Bill
- Bonanza (1961–1966) – Hugh Gwylnedd / Montague
- Blue Light (1966) – Gorlek / Gorleck
- Play of the Month (1996) - Richard Edward Snyder
- Doctor Who (1966, in the serial The Gunfighters) – Wyatt Earp
- Death Valley Days (1964–1966) – John Tunstall / Hank Butterford / Hugh Glass / Joe Meek / Big Mac
- Time Tunnel (1966 TV series) – Season 1 Episode 16 – The Revenge of Robin Hood as Little John
- The Wild Wild West (1967) – Clive Marchmount
- The Guns of Will Sonnett (1968) – Sheriff
- Mission: Impossible (1970) – Follet
- The Persuaders! (1971) – Kyle Sandor
- Rod Serling's Night Gallery (1972) – Granger (segment "Lindemann's Catch")
- Philip Marlowe, Private Eye (1983) – Gaff Talley

In 1966, the first four episodes of Blue Light were edited together to create the theatrical film I Deal in Danger. Alderson's Blue Light appearance was included in the film.
