= Buck Houghton =

American television producer and director

A.E. "Buck" Houghton
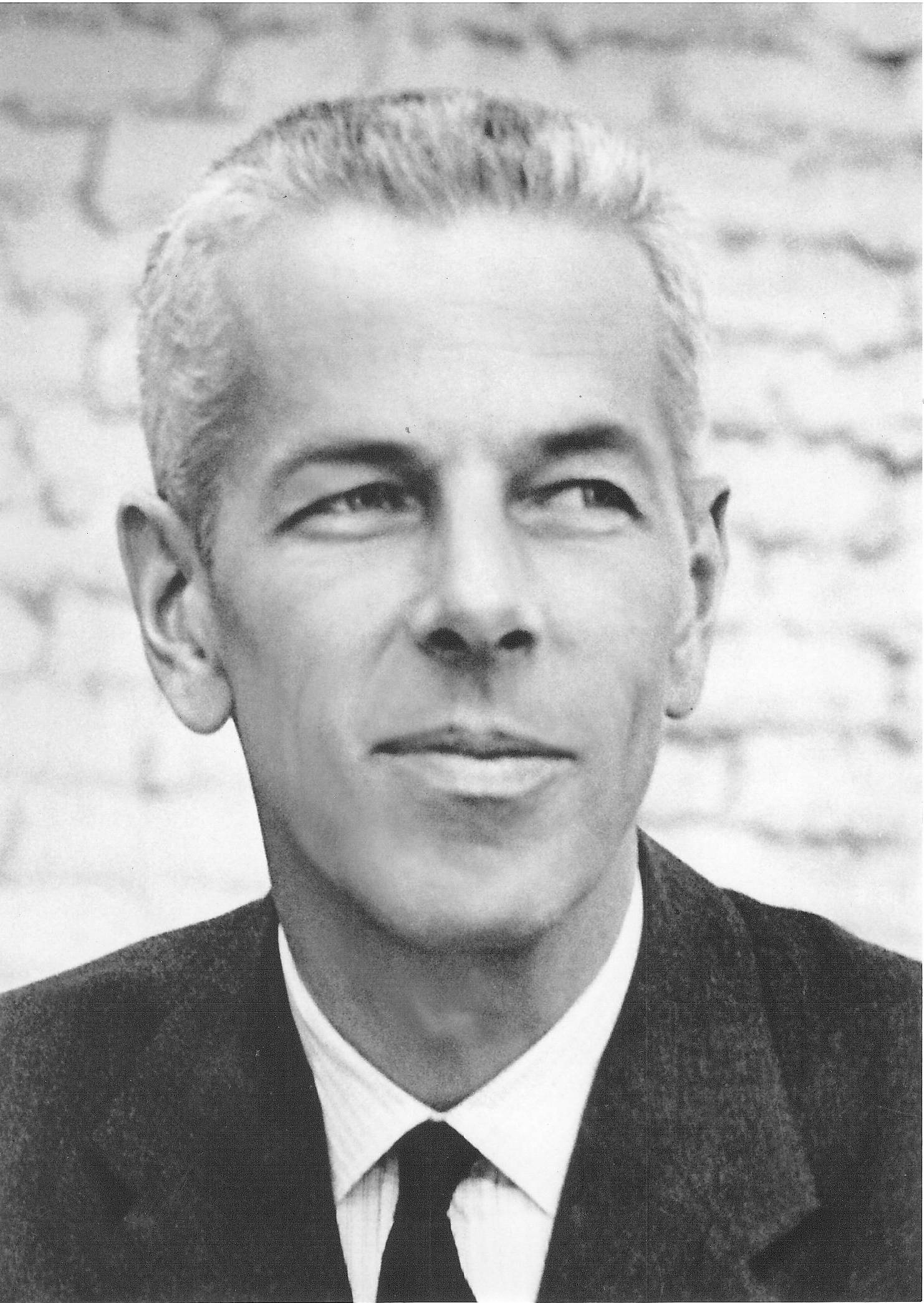
- Taken at age 45
- Born: 4 May 1915; Denver, Colorado, United States
- Died: 14 May 1999 (aged 84); Los Angeles, California, United States

Archible Ernest "Buck" Houghton (4 May 1915 – 14 May 1999) was an American television producer and writer best known for producing the first three seasons of The Twilight Zone, as well as many other television programs including Leave it to Beaver and independent films from the 1950s through the 1990s. He first entered the film industry as a reader and story editor for David O. Selznick in the 1930s. He moved over to Paramount, working his way up to the casting office and then to the budget department. During World War II, he helped make films for the Office of War Information. Following the war, Houghton assisted executive producers at RKO, and had a two-year stint as a story editor for MGM. He soon became involved in producing early TV dramas such as "China Smith", "Meet McGraw", "Yancy Derringer" and "Man with a Camera".

Houghton reached a pinnacle in his career when he was hired by Bill Self at CBS to produce 102 episodes of Rod Serling's "The Twilight Zone" in its original half-hour format. When the network insisted the fourth season consist of hour-long shows, Buck decided it was time to move on. His subsequent collaboration with dramatist Clifford Odets, "The Richard Boone Show" (1963–64) was the only repertory company on television, in which a resident cast of actors played different roles in a TV play every week. It was nominated for the Outstanding Dramatic Series Emmy Award in 1964.

Other credits include seasons of "High Chaparral", "Leave it to Beaver", "Harry O"., "Hawaii Five-O" and the American Zoetrope film, "The Escape Artist."

== Early life ==
Houghton was born in Denver, CO. His parents moved to Los Angeles because of his mother's ill health; she died when he was eleven years old. He graduated from Los Angeles High School in 1933, where he was known as Arch Houghton. He attended UCLA, where he was a member of the Phi Kappa Psi fraternity, majored in Economics and English and lettered in varsity track and field as a high-jumper. While attending high school and college, he helped out backstage on several films by Cecil B. DeMille, along with his close friend and classmate Horace Hahn.

== Family ==
He and Wanda Jackson were married in 1946 and remained so until his death. He was the father of Jim Houghton and Mona Houghton.

== Death ==
Houghton died in Los Angeles at the age of 84 on 14 May 1999. He was suffering from emphysema and Lou Gehrig's disease.

== Filmography, Producer/Writer ==
Year	Title	Capacity
1952	China Smith	Associate Producer
1954	The New Adventures of China Smith	Associate Producer
1955	The Paris Follies of 1956	Associate Producer
1956	Wire Service	Producer & AP, 4 eps.
1958-59	Man with a Camera	Producer
1958-59	Yancy Derringer	Producer
1962	General Electric Theater	Producer, 1 ep.
1959-62	The Twilight Zone	Producer, 102 eps.
1963	The Dick Powell Theater	Producer, 1 ep.
1963-64	The Richard Boone Show	Producer, 25 eps.
1965	The Long, Hot Summer	Producer, pilot ep.
1966	Blue Light	Producer, 17 eps.
1966	I Deal in Danger	Producer
1967-68	The High Chaparral	Producer, 8 eps.
1971	Nichols	Writer 1 ep.
1973	Mission: Impossible	Writer, 1 ep.
1975	Harry O	Producer, 9 eps.
1976-77	Executive Suite	Producer, 18 eps.
1981	The Violation of Sarah McDavid	Supervising producer
1982	An Innocent Love	Producer
1982	The Escape Artist	Producer
1985	Eternal Evil	Producer
1986	The Wraith	Producer
1994	Spring Awakening	Producer

== Filmography, Actor ==
Year	Title	Role	Notes
1974	The Godfather II	White-haired Senator	Uncredited

== Published works ==
- What a Producer Does (Samuel French) is a primer for would-be film and television producers.
