= Heart of a Champion: The Ray Mancini Story =

- Genre: Biography; Drama; Sport
- Written by: Dennis Nemec
- Directed by: Richard Michaels
- Starring: Robert Blake; Doug McKeon
- Music by: Mike Post
- Country of origin: United States
- Original language: English

Production
- Executive producer: Sylvester Stallone
- Producer: Robert A. Papazian
- Cinematography: Jan de Bont
- Editor: Peter E. Berger
- Running time: 94 minutes
- Production company: Robert Papazian Productions

Original release
- Network: CBS
- Release: May 1, 1985

Heart of a Champion: The Ray Mancini Story is a 1985 American made-for-television biographical sports film starring Robert Blake and Doug McKeon, directed by Richard Michaels and executive-produced by Sylvester Stallone. The film originally premiered on CBS on May 1, 1985.

== Plot ==
The film details the life of Ray Mancini, a World Boxing Association world lightweight champion boxer from 1982 to 1984, Hollywood actor and a member of the International Boxing Hall of Fame.

== Cast ==
- Robert Blake as Lenny Mancini
- Doug McKeon as Ray "Boom Boom" Mancini
  - Carl Steven as Young Ray Mancini
- Mariclare Costello as Ellen Mancini
- Tony Burton as Grif
- Ray Buktenica as Dave Wolf
- James T. Callahan as Father O'Neill
- Richard Bakalyan as Frank Jacobs
- Luisa Leschin as Ellen Mancini Jr.
- Norman Alden as Ray Arcel
- Ben Frank as Eddie Sullivan
- Richard Doyle as Journalist
- Steve Eastin as Reporter
- Johnny Haymer as Fan
- Paul Jenkins as Steelworker
- Jimmy Lennon as Announcer
- Jimmy Lennon Jr. as Announcer
- Mario Machado as Broadcaster
- Lycia Naff as Cynthia
- Dee Dee Rescher as Reporter
