= Christine Carère =

French actress (1930–2008)

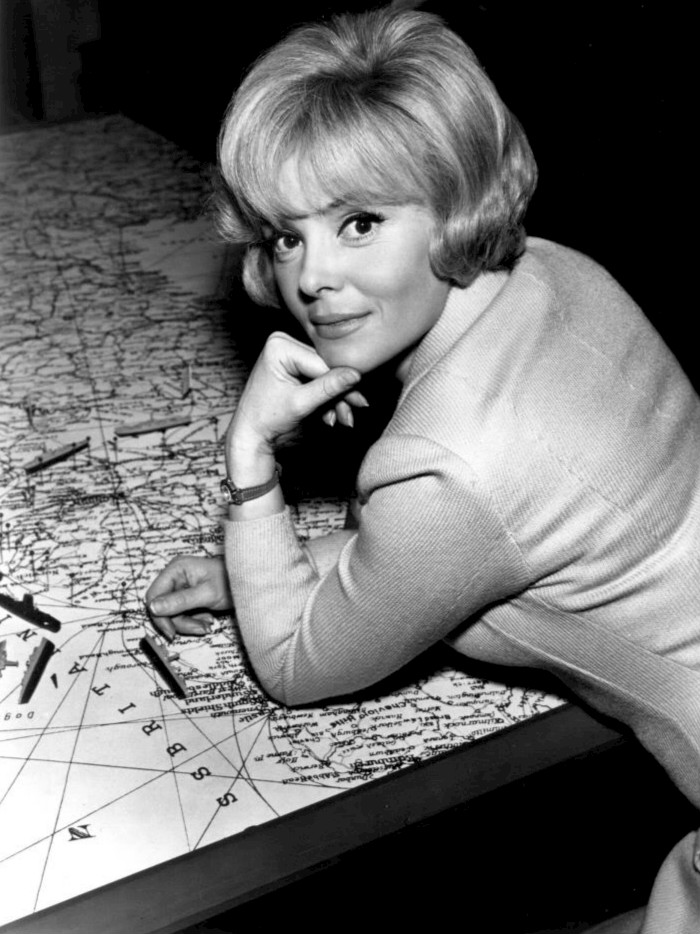
- Carère in Blue Light (1966)
- Born: Christiane Élisabeth Jeanne Marie Pelleterat de Borde; 27 July 1930; Dijon, France
- Died: 13 December 2008 (aged 78); Fréjus, France
- Other name: Christine Carrère
- Occupation: Actress
- Years active: 1951–1966
- Spouse: Philippe Nicaud (m. 1957)
- Children: 2

Christine Carère (27 July 1930 – 13 December 2008) was a French film actress who co-starred in the 1966 American television series Blue Light.

== Biography ==
Born in 1930 in Dijon, France, as Christiane Élisabeth Jeanne Marie Pelleterat de Borde,

Beginning in 1951, Carère appeared in a total of 25 films plus the 1966 television series Blue Light. She was signed by Twentieth Century Fox to appear in A Certain Smile and Mardi Gras in 1958. However, her American career was brief.

Carère died in Fréjus, France, on 13 December 2008.

== Filmography ==
Year	Title	Role	Notes
1951	Olivia		Uncredited
1951	Sweet Madness		
1951	The Passage of Venus		
1951	Paris Still Sings	Tino Rossi's partner	
1953	A Caprice of Darling Caroline	Chekina	
1954	Terza liceo	Giovanna Zanetti	
1954	Darling Anatole		
1954	Love in a Hot Climate	Pili	
1954	Cadet Rousselle	Isabelle	
1954	Tout chante autour de moi	Anne-Marie	
1954	A Free Woman	Leonora Franci	
1955	The Affair of the Poisons	Marie-Angélique de Fontanges	
1956	The Road to Paradise	Evelyne	
1956	Don Juan	Doña Inés	
1957	Les Collégiennes	Monique	
1957	Printemps à Paris	Gisèle	
1957	L'amour descend du ciel	Paulette	
1957	Delincuentes	Anita	
1957	Bonjour jeunesse	Evelyne	French version of the Swiss-German S'Waisechind vo Engelberg
1957	The Night of Suspects	Catherine Farnoux	
1957	Quelle sacrée soirée	Suzy	
1958	A Certain Smile	Dominique Vallon	
1958	Mardi Gras	Michelle Marton	
1959	A Private's Affair	Marie	
1966	I Deal in Danger	Suzanne Duchard	
