= Colette Bonheur =

Canadian singer

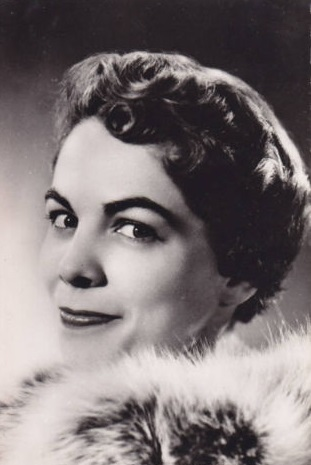

Background information
- Born: Colette Chailler; September 20, 1927; Montreal, Quebec
- Died: October 15, 1966 (aged 39) Freeport, Bahamas
- Occupation: Singer

Colette Bonheur (September 20, 1927 – October 10, 1966) was a singer from Montreal, Quebec.

== Biography ==
Colette Bonheur is observed in the radio show The Phantom of the keyboard (piano) CKVL-FM (Montreal), led by Jacques Normand, Gilles Pellerin and pianist Billy Munro in the late 1940s. The singer joined by following the cabaret troupe The Golden Pheasant by Jacques Normand in October 1950.

From 1954 to 1957, she shared with Jacques Normand Gilles Pellerin and starred in the variety show door open on the Radio-Canada. Meanwhile, she sang in cabarets Montreal's most popular contemporaries such as Cabaret Saint-Germain-des-Pres (Montreal), The Continental Café, rue Saint-Urbain in Montreal or Quebec Chez Gerard.

In the fall of 1954 she participated with Jacques Normand, Gilles Pellerin, Normand Hudon, Pierre Theriault and other programming of three Beavers, a new tavern opened above the Café Saint-Jacques. Her rendition of "Violets fields" Yves Beauparlant won her the prize in radio Canadian singing contest in 1957. In 1961 she married the saxophonist Gerry Robinson with whom she will settle in the Bahamas.

Colette Bonheur is the daughter of Quebec singer and actress Lise Bonheur (born Leontine Laurendeau), sister of singer and painter Guylaine Guy, painter Lise Chailler, and singer and artist Monique Chailler. Colette is also niece to John Philip Sousa's first oboeist Alexander Laurendeau.

She died on October 15, 1966, in Freeport, Bahamas from a forced drug overdose by her husband.

== Discography ==
- Colette Bonheur, Collection QIM (2005, Expérience, EXP-119, Compilation). Colette Bonheur, QIM Collection (2005, Experience, EXP-119, Compilation).
- Colette Bonheur Chante Pour Vous (1958, Epic, LF 2007). Colette Bonheur sings for you (1958, Epic, LF 2007).
- 12 Chansons Canadiennes (1957, Pathé, PAM 68.000). 12 Canadian songs (1957, Pathé, PAM 68,000).
