= Geneviève Kervine =

French actress (1931–1989)

- Born: 27 June 1931; Dakar, French Senegal
- Died: 5 September 1989 (aged 58); Paris, France
- Occupation: Actress
- Years active: 1953–1980 (film)

Geneviève Kervine (French pronunciation: [ʒənvjɛv kɛʁvin]; 27 June 1931 – 5 September 1989) was a French film actress. Born in Dakar in French Senegal, she emerged as a star in the 1950s and was awarded the Prix Suzanne Bianchetti for most promising actress in 1955. She was married to the singer and actor Jean Bretonnière.

== Career ==
Kervine was active on stage and in French film productions from 1952 to 1962. Film roles included Les Nuits de Montmartre (1955, based on a novel by Claude Orval), and the female lead in Alerte au Deuxieme Bureau (1956). Her last film role was in C'est Pas Moi, C'est L'autre (1962).

== Personal life ==
Geneviéve Kervine was married to actor and singer Jean Bretonnière in 1967. They had a son, Marc Bretonnière, who also became an actor, especially successful in voice parts (he was the French voice of Darth Maul, for example). She was 58 when she died from cancer in Paris, in 1989.

== Selected filmography ==
- Virgile (1953)
- Wonderful Mentality (1953)
- A Hundred Francs a Second (1953)
- Eighteen Hour Stopover (1955)
- Montmartre Nights (1955)
- Pleasures and Vices (1955)
- Four Days in Paris (1955)
- Pity for the Vamps (1956)
- A Certain Monsieur Jo (1958)
- The Night of Suspects (1960)
- It Can't Always Be Caviar (1961)
- This Time It Must Be Caviar (1961)
- It's Not My Business (1962)

== Bibliography ==
- Rob Craig. American International Pictures: A Comprehensive Filmography. McFarland, 2019.
