= Girl from Hong Kong =

1961 film

- Directed by: Franz Peter Wirth
- Written by: Oliver Hassencamp; Kurt Heuser
- Based on: Brackwasser by Heinrich Hauser
- Produced by: Fritz Hoppe; Seymour Nebenzal; Wolf Schwarz
- Starring: Hanns Lothar; Helmut Griem; Akiko Wakabayashi
- Cinematography: Klaus von Rautenfeld
- Edited by: Lilian Seng
- Music by: Michel Michelet
- Production companies: Nero Film; Neue Deutsche Filmgesellschaft
- Distributed by: Bavaria Film
- Release date: 29 August 1961
- Running time: 106 minutes
- Country: West Germany
- Language: German

Girl from Hong Kong (German: Bis zum Ende aller Tage) is a 1961 West German romance film directed by Franz Peter Wirth and starring Hanns Lothar, Helmut Griem and Akiko Wakabayashi.

The film's sets were designed by the art directors Hans Berthel and Johannes Ott.

== Cast ==
- Hanns Lothar as Kuddel Bratt
- Helmut Griem as Glenn Dierks
- Akiko Wakabayashi as Anna Suh
- Carla Hagen as Martha
- Ursula Lillig as Geesche
- Carl Lange as Knut Ohlsen
- Peter Carsten as Volkert
- Eva Pflug as Gudrun
- Maria Martinsen
- Klaus Kindler as Fleez
- Wilhelm Groothe
- Li Min as Lili Kwong
- Hela Gruel
- Karl-Heinz Kreienbaum
- Peter Thom
- Herta Fahrenkrog
- Helga Feddersen
- Erika Tweer
- Willem Fricke
- Marga Maasberg
- Charles Palent
- Chi Lin as Lee Yong
- Michiko Tanaka

== Bibliography ==
- Schrader, Sabine; Winkler, Daniel, eds. (2014). The Cinemas of Italian Migration: European and Transatlantic Narratives. Cambridge Scholars Publishing. ISBN 978-1-4438-6994-2.
