= Uncle Joe Shannon =

1978 film directed by Joseph Hanwright

- Theatrical release poster
- Directed by: Joseph Hanwright
- Written by: Burt Young
- Produced by: Robert Chartoff; Irwin Winkler
- Starring: Burt Young; Doug McKeon; Madge Sinclair
- Cinematography: Bill Butler
- Edited by: Don Zimmerman
- Music by: Bill Conti
- Distributed by: United Artists
- Release date: December 17, 1978
- Running time: 108 minutes
- Country: United States
- Language: English
- Box office: $494,797 (US)

Uncle Joe Shannon is a 1978 American drama film directed by Joseph Hanwright and written by Burt Young, who also stars. The film was produced by Robert Chartoff and Irwin Winkler and distributed by United Artists.

== Plot ==
A trumpet player, Joe Shannon believes he has little left to live for when he loses both his wife and child. Only a new relationship with a disadvantaged boy is keeping him from sinking into depression's permanent depths.

== Cast ==
- Burt Young as Joe Shannon
- Doug McKeon as Robbie
- Madge Sinclair as Margaret
- Jason Bernard as Goose
- Bert Remsen as Braddock
- Allan Rich as Dr. Clark
- Adrienne Larussa as Peggy

== Reception ==
Jennifer Dunning of The New York Times wrote that Young's screenplay was unsurprising and overly sentimental. She found the film to be "full of odd improbabilities," though she commended director Joseph Hanwright in his debut for drawing good performances from the cast. Dunning also reported of the cinematography, "Bill Butler's cameras capture the slick night surfaces and ruined faces of the street people of Los Angeles so that, clichés in themselves, they have the impact of sudden revelation."
