= The Comeback Kid (film) =

- Genre: Comedy; Romance; Sport
- Written by: Joe S. Landon
- Directed by: Peter Levin
- Starring: John Ritter; Susan Dey; Doug McKeon; Jeremy Licht; Patrick Swayze
- Theme music composer: Barry De Vorzon
- Country of origin: United States
- Original language: English

Production
- Producer: Louis Rudolph
- Cinematography: Ric Waite
- Editor: David Newhouse
- Running time: 97 min.
- Production company: ABC Circle Films

Original release
- Network: ABC
- Release: April 11, 1980

The Comeback Kid is a 1980 American made-for-television romantic comedy sports film starring John Ritter, Susan Dey and Doug McKeon which was broadcast on ABC on April 11, 1980. The film features many actors well known from their TV appearances: Ritter (Three's Company), Dey (The Partridge Family), Gregory (Barney Miller), Licht (Valerie/The Hogan Family), Lembeck (One Day at a Time), McKeon (On Golden Pond), and Kim Fields (The Facts of Life). It also stars Patrick Swayze in an early minor role.

== Plot ==
Bubba Newman, a minor league baseball player, quits the sport to do something else with his life because he feels "down and out." He renews his outlook on life when he becomes a coach for a group of underprivileged kids and finds romance. He later plots to make a baseball comeback using funds from his coaching job.

He tries pro ball again, but realizes he can no longer fit in. A tragedy that strikes one of the children brings Bubba and his group closer.

== Cast ==
- John Ritter as Bubba Newman
- Susan Dey as Megan Barrett
- Doug McKeon as Michael
- James Gregory as Scotty
- Jeremy Licht as Paul
- Dick O'Neill as Phil
- Rod Gist as Ray Carver
- Michael Lembeck as Tony
- Patrick Swayze as Chuck
- Angela Aames as Sherry
- Tan Adams as Shirley
- Abraham Alvarez as Frank
- Kevin King Cooper as Tank
- Kim Fields as Molly
- Hank Robinson as the Umpire

== See also ==
- List of baseball films
