= A Certain Monsieur Jo =

1958 film

- Directed by: René Jolivet
- Written by: René Jolivet
- Produced by: Jérôme Goulven; Pierre Gurgo-Salice
- Starring: Michel Simon; Geneviève Kervine; Jacques Morel
- Cinematography: Nicolas Hayer
- Edited by: Suzanne Sandberg
- Music by: Joseph Kosma
- Production companies: A.T.I.C.A. Lux Compagnie Cinématographique de France
- Distributed by: Lux Compagnie Cinématographique de France
- Release date: 16 April 1958
- Running time: 105 minutes
- Country: France
- Language: French

A Certain Monsieur Jo (French: Un certain Monsieur Jo) is a 1958 French crime film directed by René Jolivet and starring Michel Simon, Geneviève Kervine and Jacques Morel.

The film's sets were designed by the art director Lucien Carré.

== Synopsis ==
A former gangster now happily retired and running an inn on the banks of the river Marne, is pulled back into his former life when a pair of kidnappers bring a girl they have taken to his inn and demands he shelter them.

== Cast ==
- Michel Simon as Joseph 'Jo' Guardini
- Geneviève Kervine as Simone Couturier
- Jacques Morel as Inspecteur Loriot
- Raymond Bussières as Louis
- Jean Degrave as Alfred Léonard
- Joëlle Fournier as Yvette Lemarchand
- Roger Legris as L'aveugle
- Gabrielle Fontan as Mme. Michel
- Gina Manès as Lolo
- Véronique Simon as Mado
- Henri San Juan as Villequin
- Jean Daurand as Le cafetier
- Christian Brocard as Le boulanger livreur
- Jack Ary as Charlot
- Michel Salina as Commissaire Leclerc

== Bibliography ==
- Rège, Philippe. Encyclopedia of French Film Directors, Volume 1. Scarecrow Press, 2009.
