= An Innocent Love =

- Genre: Romance / Drama
- Written by: I. C. Rapoport
- Directed by: Roger Young
- Starring: Melissa Sue Anderson; Doug McKeon
- Music by: David Michael Frank
- Country of origin: United States
- Original language: English language

Production
- Producer: Buck Houghton
- Cinematography: Chuck Arnold
- Editor: Michael Vittes
- Running time: 100 minutes

Original release
- Network: CBS
- Release: March 2, 1982

An Innocent Love is a 1982 American made-for-television coming-of-age film directed by Roger Young, starring Melissa Sue Anderson and Doug McKeon.

== Plot ==
Harry Woodward (Doug McKeon) is a gifted 14-year-old mathematician who is studying at the University of Washington. He becomes the tutor of 19-year-old Molly Rush (Melissa Sue Anderson), who entered the university on a volleyball scholarship and is trying to raise her GPA in order to transfer to UCLA. Harry soon develops a crush on her, but she is dating jock Duncan Widders (Steven Bauer). In the process of tutoring her, Harry comes of age, dealing with many first obstacles such as his first crush, overbearing parents, enrolling his first sports, among others.

== Cast ==
- Melissa Sue Anderson as Molly Rush
- Doug McKeon as Harry Woodward
- Steven Bauer as Duncan Widders
- Kristoff St. John as Mario
- Bill Calvert as Max
- Kendall Kay Munsey as Beatrice
- Pat Finley as June Woodward
- John Colenback as Andrew Woodward

== Reception ==
The reviewer of The New York Times called An Innocent Love "a very down-to-earth, engaging television movie. [..] Miss Anderson plays Molly sweetly and sturdily, but this is mostly Mr. McKeon's show."
