= The Mischief =

Pub in Norwich, England

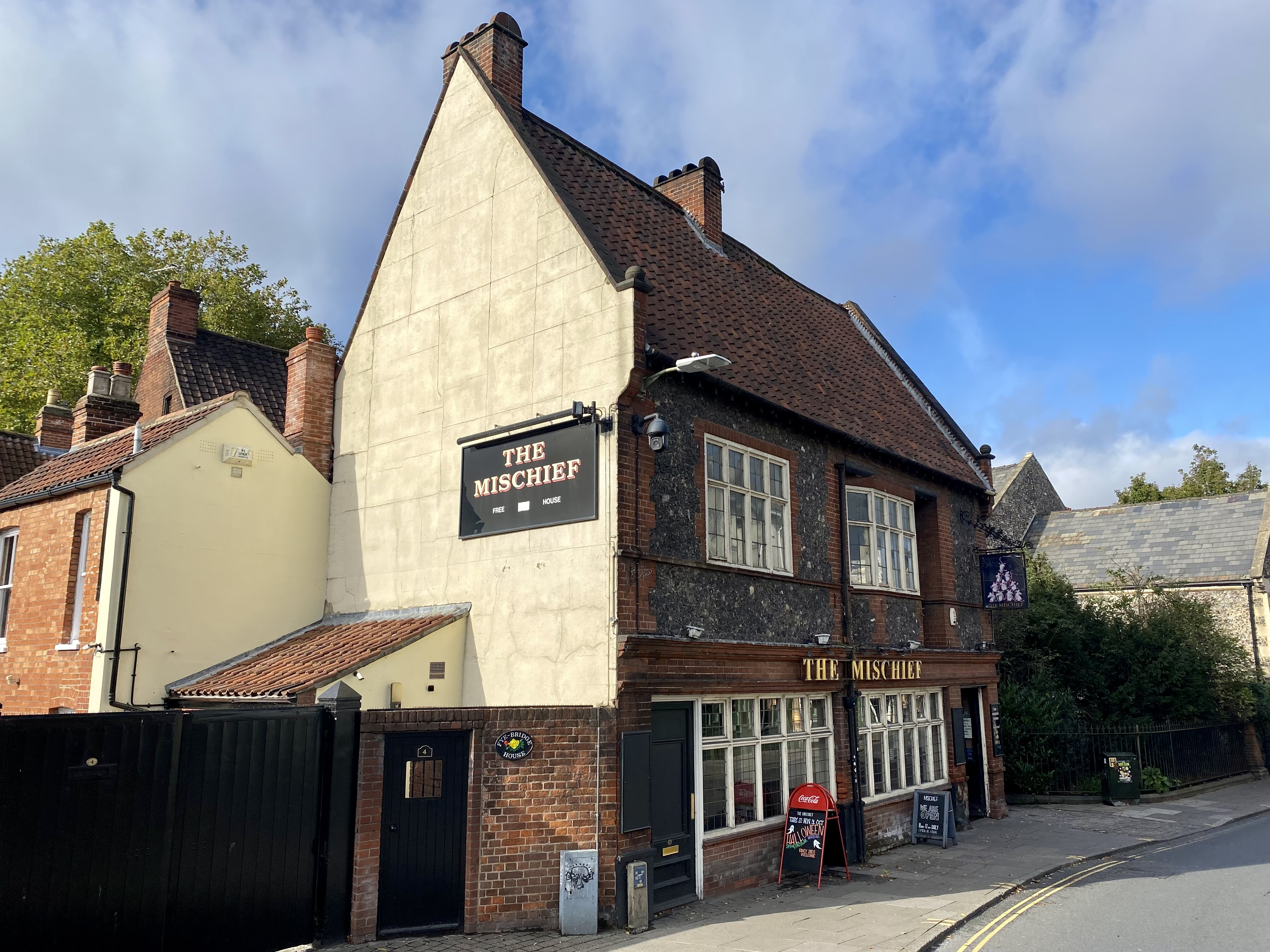
- The Mischief in 2022
- Interactive map of the The Mischief area

General information
- Location: 8 Fye Bridge Street, Norwich, England
- Coordinates: 52.63305°N 1.29687°E
- Grid position: TG 23196 09024

Listed Building – Grade II
- Designated: 26 February 1954
- Reference no.: 1051242

The Mischief is a Grade II listed pub in Norwich, England. Situated in a former courtyard house, which belonged to mayor of Norwich Alexander Thurston, the pub retains both sixteenth century features alongside the nineteenth century façade. The Mischief is notable as the first location of the Jacquard Club, a folk music group which hosted musicians such as Paul Simon. It is situated on Fye Bridge Street, to the south of St Clement's Church.

== History ==
The Mischief occupies the remaining parts of a sixteenth-century courtyard house. This house belonged to grocer and mercer Alexander Thurston who became mayor in 1600. In 1599, he incorporated stone fireplaces with his merchant's mark in the left-hand spandrel and the arms of his wife's family, the Aldrich family, in the right-hand spandrel. One of these fireplaces still exists behind the bar.

The east end of the building was rebuilt in the 19th century when the road was widened to accommodate trams. Unlike other parts of the city, the area near to the Mischief retains many pubs from the nineteenth century; there are five in the 100 yards (91 m) between the Mischief and the Maids Head Hotel. The pub was called The Wine Vaults, trading under Carter Steward & Co Wine Vaults in the 1890s.

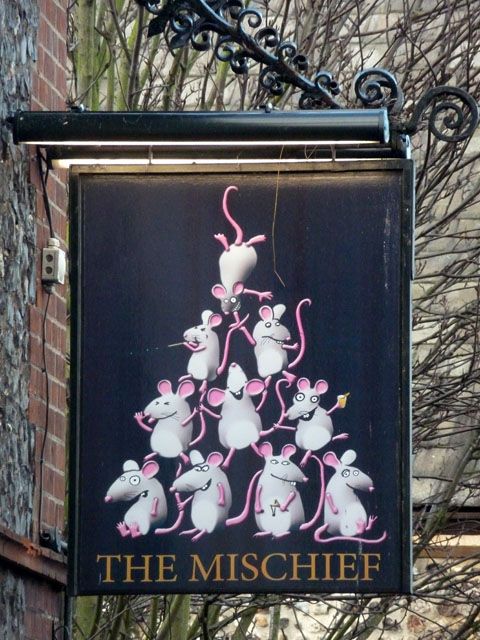
The sign of The Mischief as of 2013

The pub formerly had a sign by John Crome, depicting William Hogarth's The Man with the Load of Mischief or Man Loaded with Mischief. This sign showed a man carrying a woman on his back, who is drinking gin and holding a monkey and magpie, a representation of mischief, which once hung outside the pub. This "famous" sign from Norwich was included in a 1936 exhibition of pub signs held in London. The pub became a grade II listed building on 26 February 1954. In reference to Crome's sign, the pub was renamed to The Mischief in 1963. Considered sexist, it has since been changed to depict a mischievous boy and later a group of mice for which the collective noun is 'mischief'.

Musician Albert Cooper and his brother Tony founded the Jacquard Club, a folk music group in 1960 or 1964. Named after Joseph Marie Jacquard, the club was located in the basement of the Mischief until the club moved to the White Lion on Magdalen Street. In the Mischief, the club most hosted performances from the likes of Paul Simon, Judy Collins, Ralph McTell in the Hickory Nuts, Tom Paxton, and George Melly.

== Architecture ==
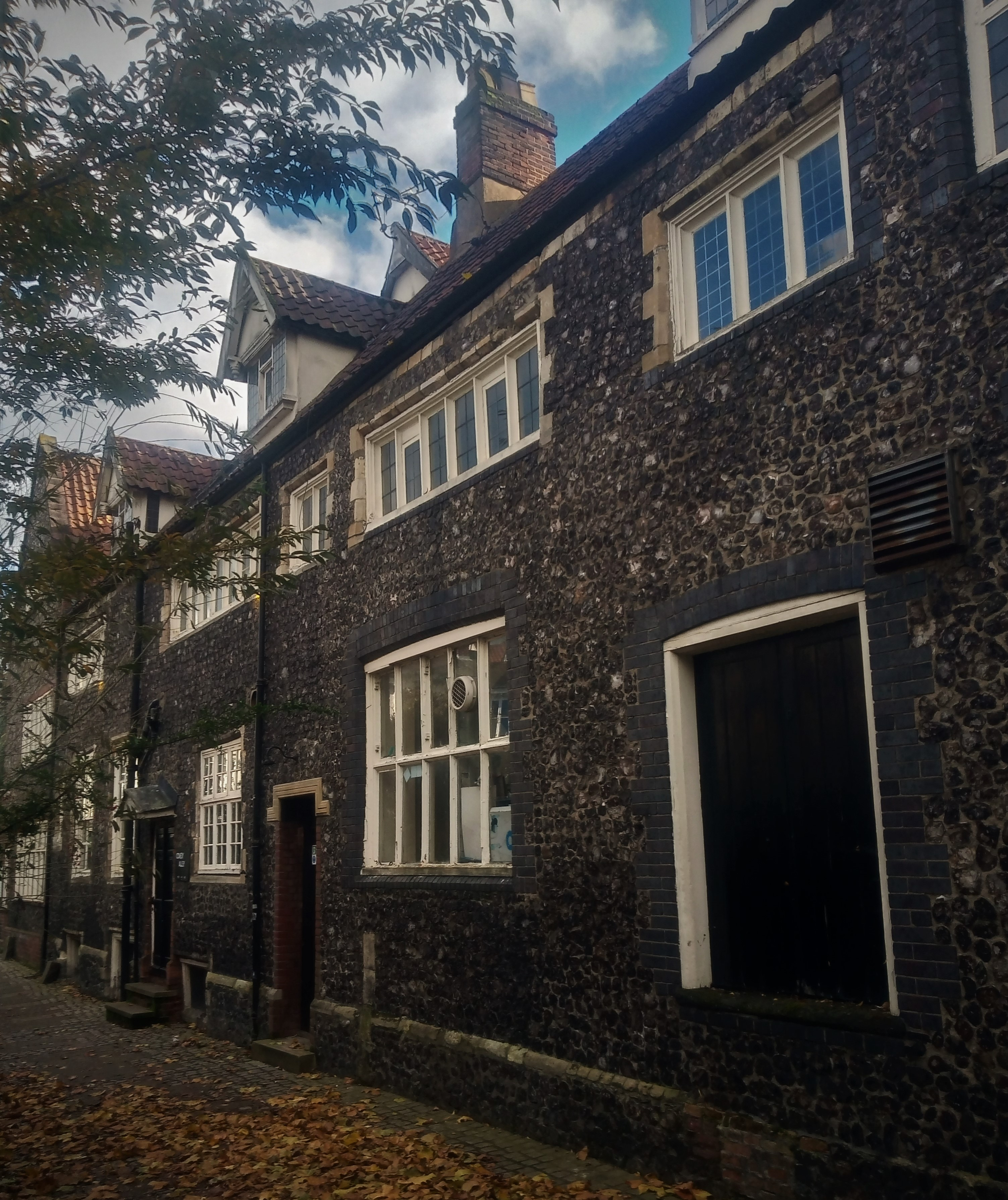
The north wall of the Mischief's long north range along St Clement's Alley

While the building's earliest fabric is from the 16th century, additions were made from the 17th century on. It is constructed of flint on a limestone pedestal. The building has pantile roofs.

The building's longest range is the north; a two-storey range, with a semi-basement. There are 6 windows on the first floor of the north wall along St Clement's Alley; this includes two six-light and one seven-light mullion windows on the first floor and three gable dormers. There is also a 20th-century central door on this side, as well as an 18th-century door on the left with a pedimented hood. On the south wall of the north range, which overlooks a central courtyard, is an eight-light mullion window with arched transom. The wall also shows the spandrel of a wide arch which would have been situated above a large bay window, suggesting that the north range was once a hall. Inside, the original floor and ceiling joists are later replacements. The entry to the yard is from the 17th century.

There are two doors on either end of the building's long two-storey street façade, rebuilt in the 19th century. The first floor contains two mullion and transom first-floor windows, with the right one in a recessed canted bay, and an overhanging eaves cornice. There is an eight-light mullion window overlooking the courtyard. This east range holds the parlour.

== Sources ==
- Holmes, Frances; Holmes, Michael (2011). Norwich Pubs and Breweries: Past and Present. ISBN 9780956627223.
