= Castels et Bézenac =

- Commune
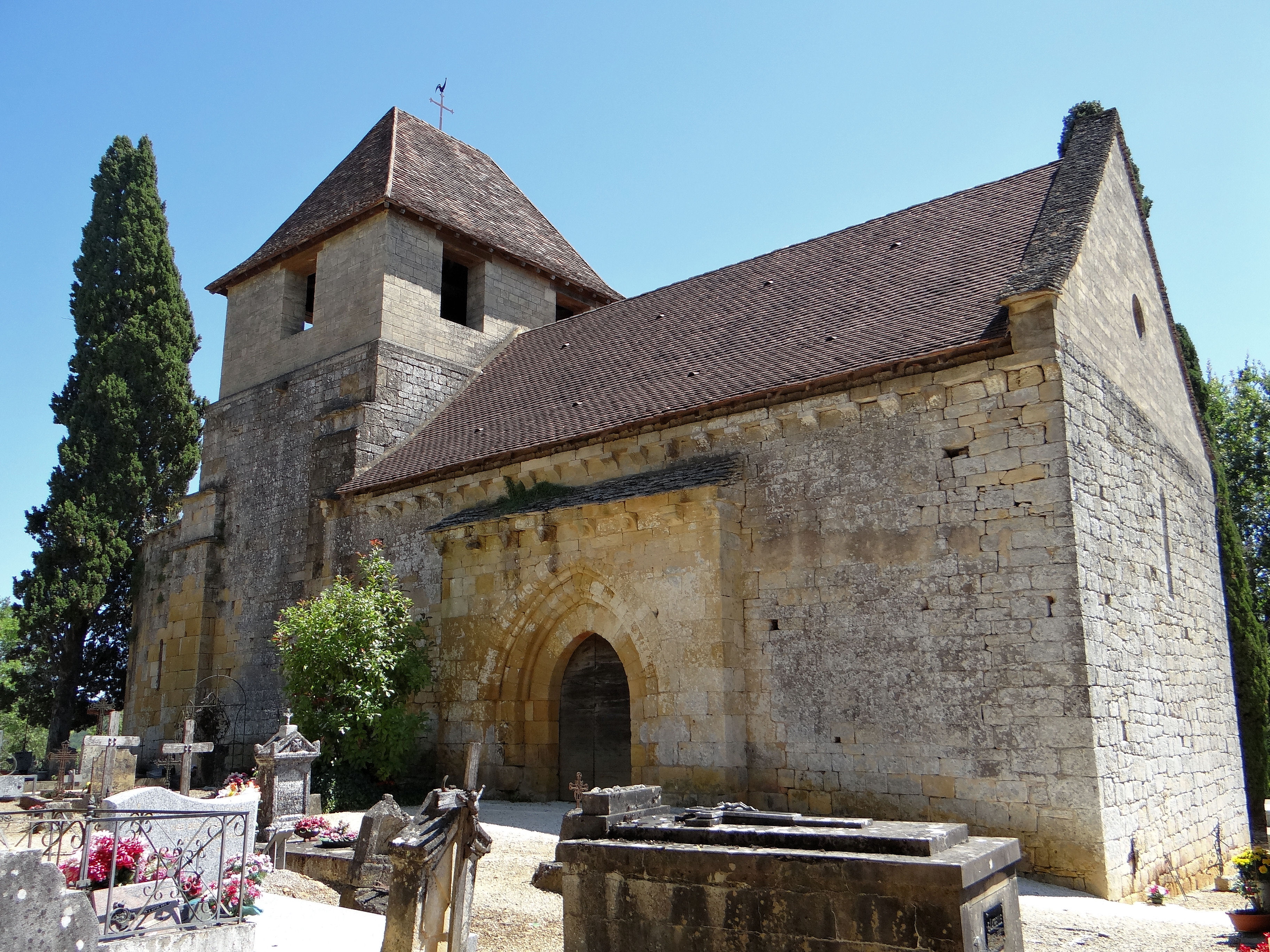
- The church in Vieux-Castel

- Coat of arms
- Location of Castels et Bézenac
- Location within France Location within Nouvelle-Aquitaine
- Coordinates: 44°52′01″N 1°03′07″E
- Country: France
- Region: Nouvelle-Aquitaine
- Department: Dordogne
- Arrondissement: Sarlat-la-Canéda
- Canton: Vallée Dordogne
- Intercommunality: Vallée de la Dordogne et Forêt Bessède
- Area^{1}: 23.76 km^{2} (9.17 sq mi)
- Population (2023): 813
  - Density: 34.2/km^{2} (88.6/sq mi)
- Time zone: UTC+01:00 (CET)
  - Summer (DST): UTC+02:00 (CEST)
- INSEE/Postal code: 24087 /24220
- ^{1} French Land Register data, which excludes lakes, ponds, glaciers > 1 km^{2} (0.386 sq mi or 247 acres) and river estuaries.

Castels et Bézenac (Occitan: Castèls e Bézenac) is a commune in the department of Dordogne, southwestern France. The municipality was established on 1 January 2017 by merger of the former communes of Castels (the seat) and Bézenac.

== See also ==
- Communes of the Dordogne department
