= Ursula Lillig =

German actress

- Born: 2 September 1938; Magdeburg, Saxony, Germany
- Died: 16 June 2004 (aged 65); Frankfurt am Main, Hesse, Germany
- Occupation: Actress
- Years active: 1958–1997

Ursula Lillig (1938–2004) was a German film and television actress.

== Selected filmography ==
- Adieu, Prinzessin (1961, TV film)
- Girl from Hong Kong (1961)

== Bibliography ==
- Vernaglione, Paolo (1999). Rainer Werner Fassbinder (in Italian). Rome: Gremese Editore. ISBN 978-88-7742-329-0.
