= Coux-et-Bigaroque =

Commune in Dordogne, France

- Part of Coux-et-Bigaroque-Mouzens
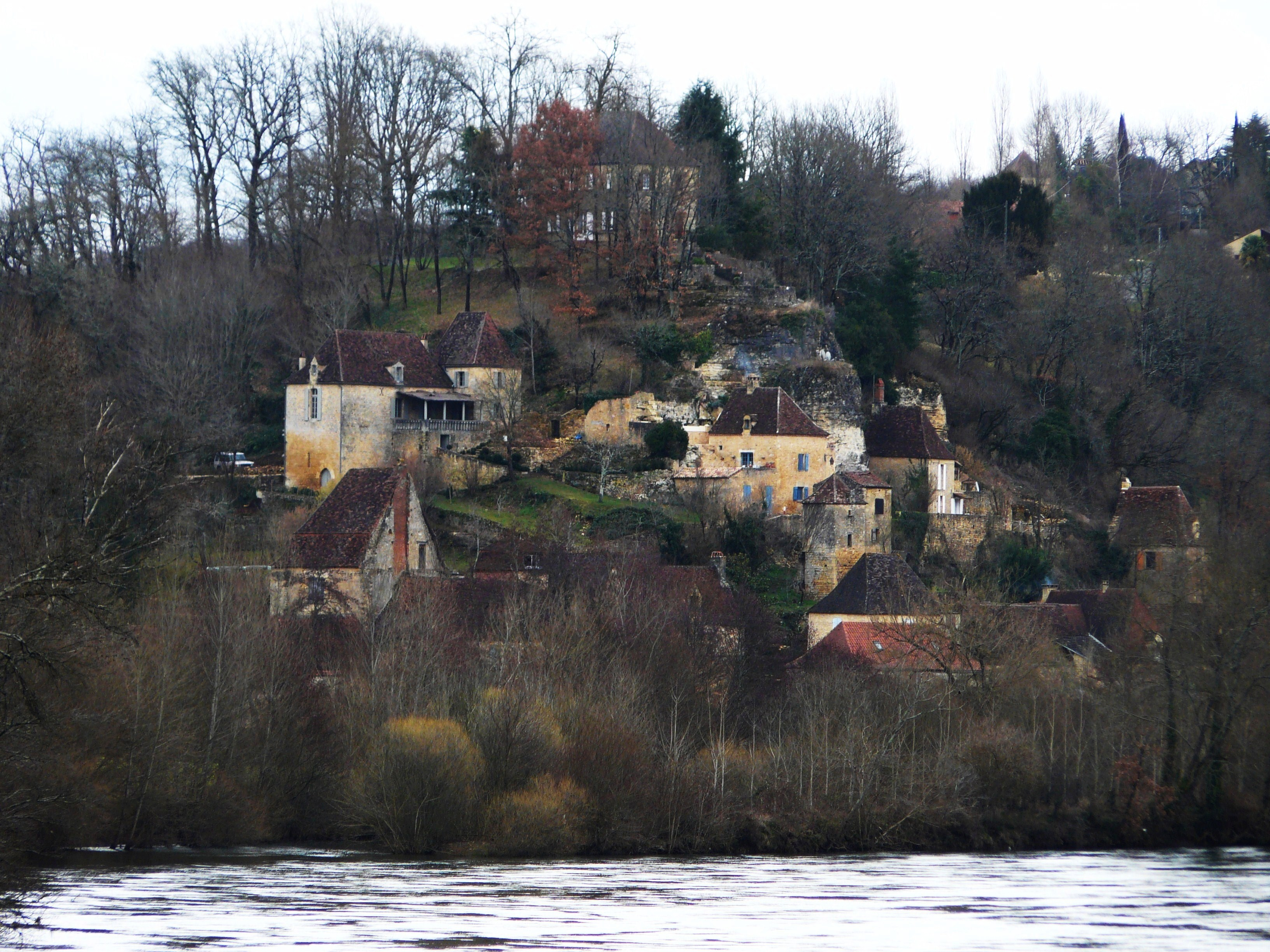

- Coat of arms
- Location of Coux-et-Bigaroque
- Location within France Location within Nouvelle-Aquitaine
- Coordinates: 44°50′05″N 0°58′27″E
- Country: France
- Region: Nouvelle-Aquitaine
- Department: Dordogne
- Arrondissement: Sarlat-la-Canéda
- Canton: Vallée Dordogne
- Commune: Coux-et-Bigaroque-Mouzens
- Area^{1}: 19.33 km^{2} (7.46 sq mi)
- Elevation: 80 m (260 ft)
- Highest elevation: 245 m (804 ft)
- Lowest elevation: 45 m (148 ft)
- Population (2017): 987
  - Density: 51.1/km^{2} (132/sq mi)
- Time zone: UTC+01:00 (CET)
  - Summer (DST): UTC+02:00 (CEST)
- Postal code: 24220
- ^{1} French Land Register data, which excludes lakes, ponds, glaciers > 1 km^{2} (0.386 sq mi or 247 acres) and river estuaries.

Coux-et-Bigaroque (French pronunciation: [kuks e bigaʁɔk]; Occitan: Lo Cos e Bigaròca) is a former commune in the Dordogne department in southwestern France. On 1 January 2016, it was merged into the new commune Coux-et-Bigaroque-Mouzens.

== Population ==
Historical population
Year	Pop.	±% p.a.
1962	766	—
1968	739	−0.60%
1975	649	−1.84%
1982	720	+1.49%
1990	708	−0.21%
1999	818	+1.62%
2017	987	+1.05%
Source: EHESS and INSEE

== History ==
In 1825, the former communes of Coux and Bigaroque merged into Coux-et-Bigaroque.

== See also ==
- Communes of the Dordogne department
