= Audrix =

- Commune
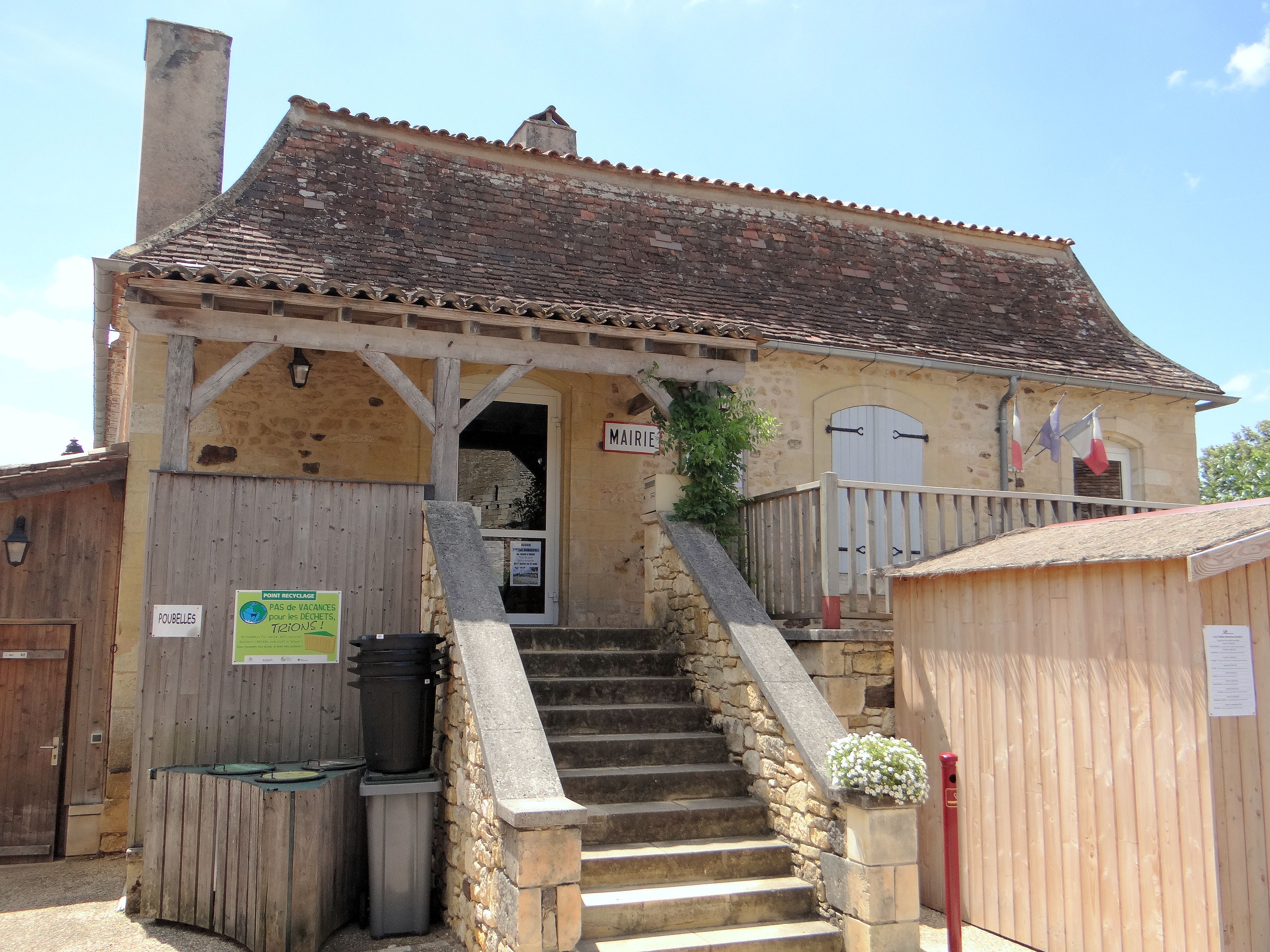
- Town hall
- Location of Audrix
- Location within France Location within Nouvelle-Aquitaine
- Coordinates: 44°52′55″N 0°56′52″E
- Country: France
- Region: Nouvelle-Aquitaine
- Department: Dordogne
- Arrondissement: Sarlat-la-Canéda
- Canton: Vallée Dordogne
- Intercommunality: CC Vallée Homme

Government
  - Mayor (2020–2026): Claude Thuillier
- Area^{1}: 6.22 km^{2} (2.40 sq mi)
- Elevation: 190 m (620 ft)
- Highest elevation: 242 m (794 ft)
- Lowest elevation: 60 m (200 ft)
- Population (2023): 287
  - Density: 46.1/km^{2} (120/sq mi)
- Time zone: UTC+01:00 (CET)
  - Summer (DST): UTC+02:00 (CEST)
- INSEE/Postal code: 24015 /24260
- ^{1} French Land Register data, which excludes lakes, ponds, glaciers > 1 km^{2} (0.386 sq mi or 247 acres) and river estuaries.

Audrix (French pronunciation: [odʁiks]; Occitan: Audrics) is a commune in the Dordogne department in Nouvelle-Aquitaine in southwestern France.

== Population ==
Historical population
Year	Pop.	±% p.a.
1968	116	—
1975	120	+0.49%
1982	130	+1.15%
1990	180	+4.15%
1999	238	+3.15%
2007	286	+2.32%
2012	289	+0.21%
2017	278	−0.77%
2023	287	+0.53%
Source: INSEE

The local population is named Audrixois in French.

== Local Culture and Heritage ==
Audrix was first found written in the XIIIe century, mentioned as Audris. This place was occupied during the Gallo-Romaine period, resulting to a Romane church build over the XIIe century, still worth visiting. This unique name refers to a German person: Audricus or Aldrik.

== Transmitter ==
A Television and radio transmitter station is situated near Audrix. The elevation of the site is 240 m above sea level. The pylon height is 200 m.

=== FM ===
4 transmitters:

- France Inter 92.3
- France Culture 94.0
- France Musique 97.1
- France Bleu Périgord 99.0

=== Television ===
(H = horizontal polarization and V = vertical polarization) 3 UHF transmitters broadcasting at 255 kW PAR

- TF1 37 (H)
- France 2 34 (H)
- France 3 31 (H)

2 UHF transmitters broadcasting at 90 kW PAR

- France 5/Arte 66 (V)
- M6 58 (V)

1 UHF transmitter broadcasting at 3.5 kW PAR

- Aquitv 25(H)

=== Digital television ===
6 UHF (multiplex) transmitters broadcasting at 10 kW at PAR with restriction of certain frequencies.

- R1 33 (H) : France 2, France 3 Périgords, France 4, France 5, Arte, LCP / Public Sénat
- R2 42 (H) : I-Télé, BFM TV, Direct 8, Gulli, Europe 2 TV, TMC
- R3 45 (H) : Canal+, Canal+ Cinéma, Canal+ Sport, Planète, Canal J
- R4 39 (H) : M6, W9, TF6, Paris Première, AB1, NT1
- R5 22 (H) : (not used)
- R6 30 (H) : TF1, LCI, Eurosport France, TPS Star, NRJ 12

== See also ==
- Communes of the Dordogne department
