= Castels =

Commune in Dordogne, France

- Part of Castels et Bézenac
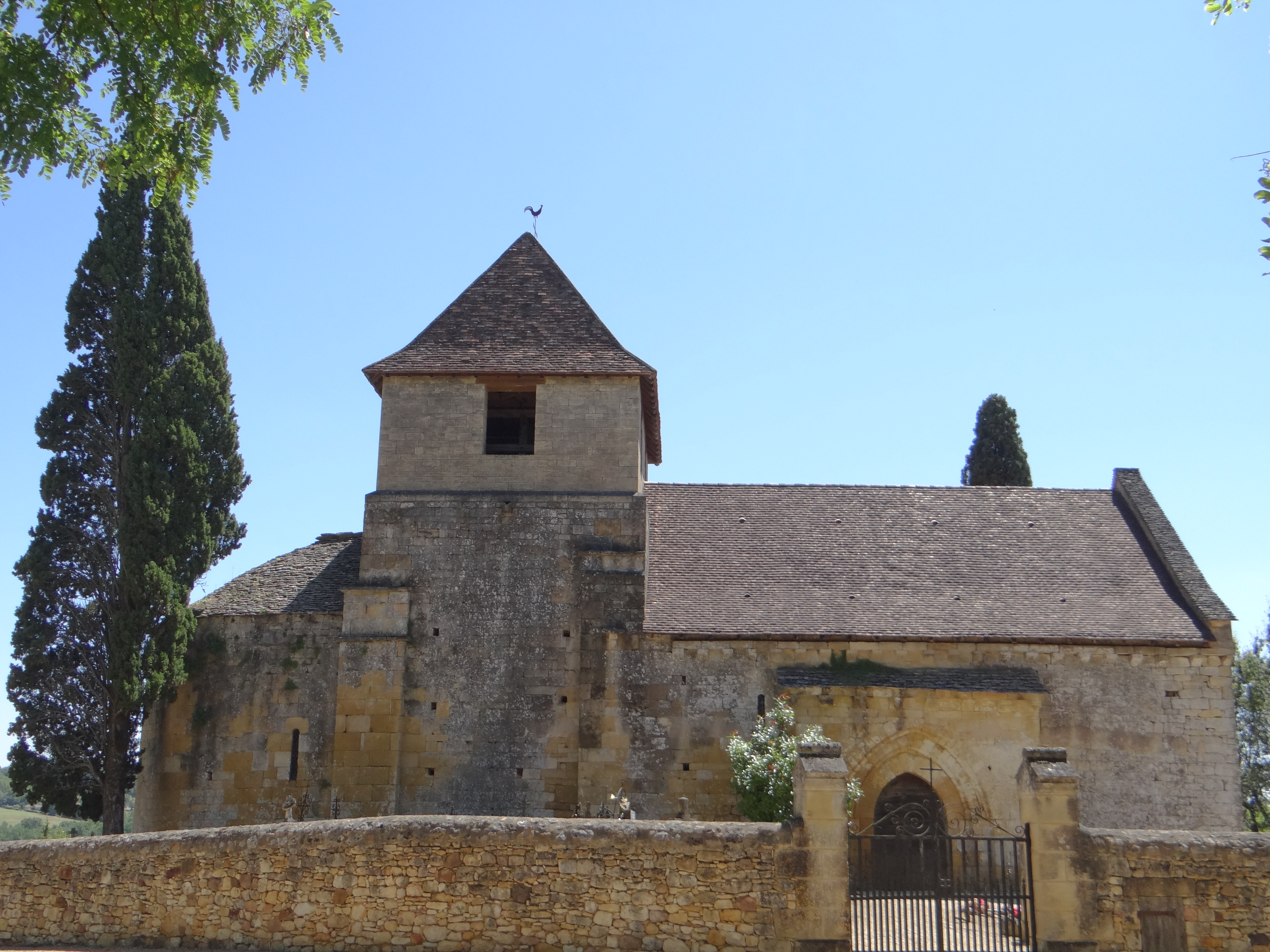
- Location of Castels
- Location within France Location within Nouvelle-Aquitaine
- Coordinates: 44°52′01″N 1°03′06″E
- Country: France
- Region: Nouvelle-Aquitaine
- Department: Dordogne
- Arrondissement: Sarlat-la-Canéda
- Canton: Vallée Dordogne
- Commune: Castels et Bézenac
- Area^{1}: 19.6 km^{2} (7.6 sq mi)
- Elevation: 70 m (230 ft)
- Highest elevation: 264 m (866 ft)
- Lowest elevation: 57 m (187 ft)
- Population (2017): 653
  - Density: 33.3/km^{2} (86.3/sq mi)
- Time zone: UTC+01:00 (CET)
  - Summer (DST): UTC+02:00 (CEST)
- Postal code: 24220
- ^{1} French Land Register data, which excludes lakes, ponds, glaciers > 1 km^{2} (0.386 sq mi or 247 acres) and river estuaries.

Castels (Occitan: Castèl meaning castle) is a former commune in the Dordogne department in Nouvelle-Aquitaine in southwestern France. On 1 January 2017, it was merged into the new commune Castels et Bézenac.

== Population ==
Historical population
Year	Pop.	±% p.a.
1962	491	—
1968	449	−1.48%
1975	416	−1.08%
1982	385	−1.10%
1990	402	+0.54%
1999	445	+1.14%
2017	653	+2.15%
Source: EHESS and INSEE

== See also ==
- Communes of the Dordogne department
