= Mischief (1985 film) =

1985 film by Mel Damski

- Theatrical release poster
- Directed by: Mel Damski
- Written by: Noel Black
- Produced by: Sam Manners; Michael Nolin; Jere Henshaw (uncredited)
- Starring: Doug McKeon; Catherine Mary Stewart; Kelly Preston; Chris Nash
- Cinematography: Donald E. Thorin
- Edited by: O. Nicholas Brown
- Music by: Barry De Vorzon
- Distributed by: 20th Century Fox
- Release date: February 8, 1985
- Running time: 97 minutes
- Country: United States
- Language: English
- Budget: $8 million
- Box office: $8,692,426

Mischief is a 1985 American comedy film starring Doug McKeon, Chris Nash, Catherine Mary Stewart and Kelly Preston. The film was directed by Mel Damski and written by Noel Black. The original music score was composed by Barry De Vorzon.

Set in Nelsonville, Ohio, in 1956, its soundtrack features many popular songs from the era.

== Plot ==
In Nelsonville, Ohio in 1956, nonconformist, extroverted Eugene "Gene" Harbrough moves from Chicago, living next door to the introverted, clumsy Jonathan Bellah. They soon develop a friendship, with Gene deciding to take him under his wing and teach him how to attract women.

Jonathan's main objective is to win over the sexy Marilyn McCauley, in spite of his shyness. Gene proclaims that he can guide him to win her over in a month.

Gene has his own love life to maintain with his crush, Bunny Miller, who reciprocates his feelings. He also defends Jonathan and himself from the wealthy class bully, Kenny, Bunny's jealous jock boyfriend.

After a confrontation at the drive-in, Kenny challenges Gene to a game with their cars, center line chicken. Neither backs down in time, so both cars are damaged. Gene's father hits him for damaging the car and grounds him. This shows the dysfunctional relationship he has with his widowed father, who has zero tolerance for Gene's often wild escapades.

Jonathan gives Gene much needed support and friendship; in return Gene helps him with his self-esteem. Marilyn agrees to go out with Jonathan, and after only a few dates takes away his virginity. At the same time, Gene and Bunny progress their relationship, with him talking about his future dream to own a horse stable.

After an evening scuffle at the local diner (instigated by the pompous Kenny) that results in some damage to the premises, Gene's father kicks him out. Having disappeared for weeks, Gene reappears on the night of the prom. Hunting down Jonathan, they go to the prom without tuxes. Marilyn has gone to the prom with her ex, a quarterback she dated the previous year, and Bunny has attended with Kenny.

The guys take off, with Bunny trying to chase after Gene. Just outside of town Jonathan and Gene stop and catch up. It turns out that Gene has relocated to Kentucky, where he has gotten work in a stable. He decided to come back for Bunny, but now feels she won't go with him. Jonathan goes to find her, Gene and Bunny reconcile, and they take off for Kentucky on his motorcycle.

Back in town, Jonathan informs Bunny's father that she's gone, stands up to Kenny by totaling his car and finally asks out classmate Rosalie, who recently had her braces removed.

== Cast ==
- Doug McKeon as Jonathan Bellah
- Chris Nash as Eugene "Gene" Harbrough
- Catherine Mary Stewart as Bunny Miller
- Kelly Preston as Marilyn McCauley
- D.W. Brown as Kenny Brubaker
- Jami Gertz as Rosalie Hewitt
- Margaret Blye as Claire Miller
- Graham Jarvis as Mr. Miller
- Terry O'Quinn as Claude Harbrough

== Production ==
Doug McKeon later called the film the most enjoyable he worked on. He said this was because "I turned 18 during the making of the film, and thus I was an “adult” for the first time in my career and didn't need a guardian with me anymore. Moreover, all the cast on that film (Chris Nash, Kelly Preston, Catherine Mary Stewart, and Jami Gertz) were so much fun to be around. Furthermore, the film took place in the 1950s, and driving the old cars, listening to that era's music, wearing the clothes, etc. It was really enjoyable."

== Reception ==
On Rotten Tomatoes the film has an approval rating of 57% based on reviews from 7 critics.

Jay Carr of The Boston Globe said the film "falls out somewhere in the middle of the nostalgia pile. It's not as bad as the worst, not as good as the best. It's likable, but it's stolen by its props. They're more specific than the characters, starting with the locale. The filmmakers were lucky to find the real-life town of Nelsonville, Ohio, for their look back at high school life in 1956."

Kevin Thomas of the Los Angeles Times said, "Neither terrible nor outstanding, it's the kind of middle-of-the-road picture that's hard to remember a week after seeing it."

Janet Maslin of The New York Times wrote, "if Norman Rockwell had wanted to make Porky's he might have come up with something like Mischief a small-town fable about a sex-obsessed teenager. With its summery settings, pretty costumes and pastel hues, Mischief is nostalgic and then some; it has the quality of something remembered in especially flattering light."
