= Guylaine Guy =

Canadian singer (1929–2024)

Guylaine Guy (born Guylaine Chailler; 6 April 1929 – 31 March 2024) was a Canadian singer and painter from Montreal, Quebec.

== Biography ==
Guylaine Chailler was the daughter of Quebec singer and actress Lise Bonheur (born Leontine Laurendeau); and sister to singer Colette Bonheur, painter Lise Chailler, and singer and artist Monique Chailler.

She debuted in Montreal cabarets. She sang at the Faisan Doré in 1950 and in 1952 was elected Miss Radio-TV by Radiomonde. She worked in Montreal cabarets for several years, often with Jacques Normand and Gilles Pellerin.

In 1955, Charles Trenet discovered Guylaine in Montreal and began writing songs for her. She made a grand entrance at the Olympia with Charles Trenet and Louis Armstrong. Settling permanently in Paris in 1956, she released on record several songs by Trenet and performed at the Bobino theater. After touring Europe, North Africa, and the Middle East, she returned to Quebec. She performed in Montreal at the opening of the Queen Elizabeth Hotel in April 1958, made several television appearances, and played the title role in Irma La Douce with the Theater of the New World. In 1963, her song "Salvame Dios" was a hit on the record charts. Shortly after, she turned to painting and left singing.

Guy died in Saint-Arnoult, Calvados, France on 31 March 2024, at the age of 94.
