= Bézenac =

Commune in Dordogne, France

- Part of Castels et Bézenac
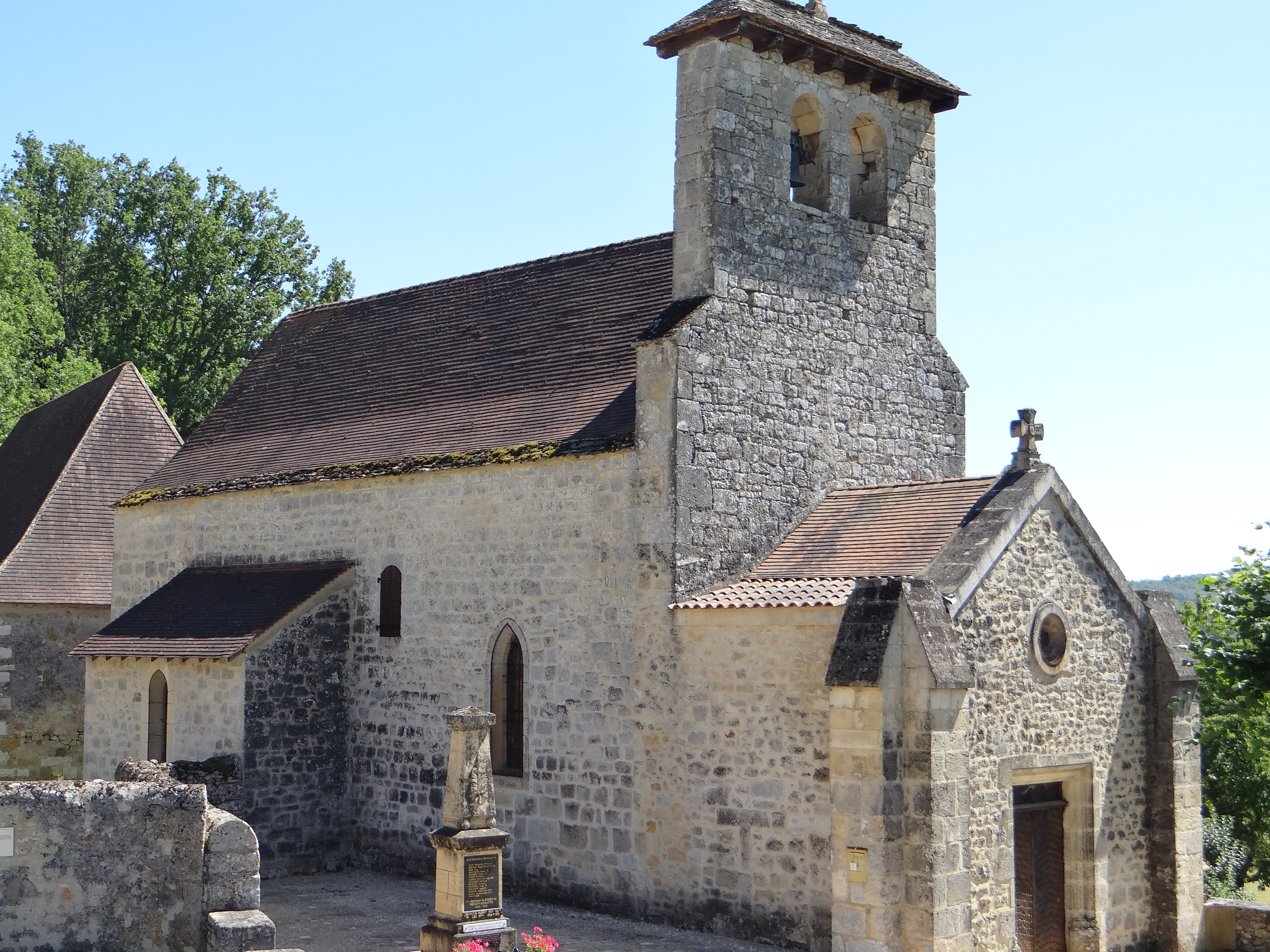
- Location of Bézenac
- Location within France Location within Nouvelle-Aquitaine
- Coordinates: 44°50′40″N 1°05′28″E
- Country: France
- Region: Nouvelle-Aquitaine
- Department: Dordogne
- Arrondissement: Sarlat-la-Canéda
- Canton: Vallée Dordogne
- Commune: Castels et Bézenac
- Area^{1}: 4.16 km^{2} (1.61 sq mi)
- Elevation: 120 m (390 ft)
- Highest elevation: 267 m (876 ft)
- Lowest elevation: 57 m (187 ft)
- Population (2017): 156
  - Density: 37.5/km^{2} (97.1/sq mi)
- Time zone: UTC+01:00 (CET)
  - Summer (DST): UTC+02:00 (CEST)
- Postal code: 240220
- ^{1} French Land Register data, which excludes lakes, ponds, glaciers > 1 km^{2} (0.386 sq mi or 247 acres) and river estuaries.

Bézenac (Occitan: Besenac) is a former commune in the Dordogne department in southwestern France. On 1 January 2017, it was merged into the new commune Castels et Bézenac.

== See also ==
- Communes of the Dordogne département
