= Mouzens, Dordogne =

Mouzens
- Part of Coux-et-Bigaroque-Mouzens
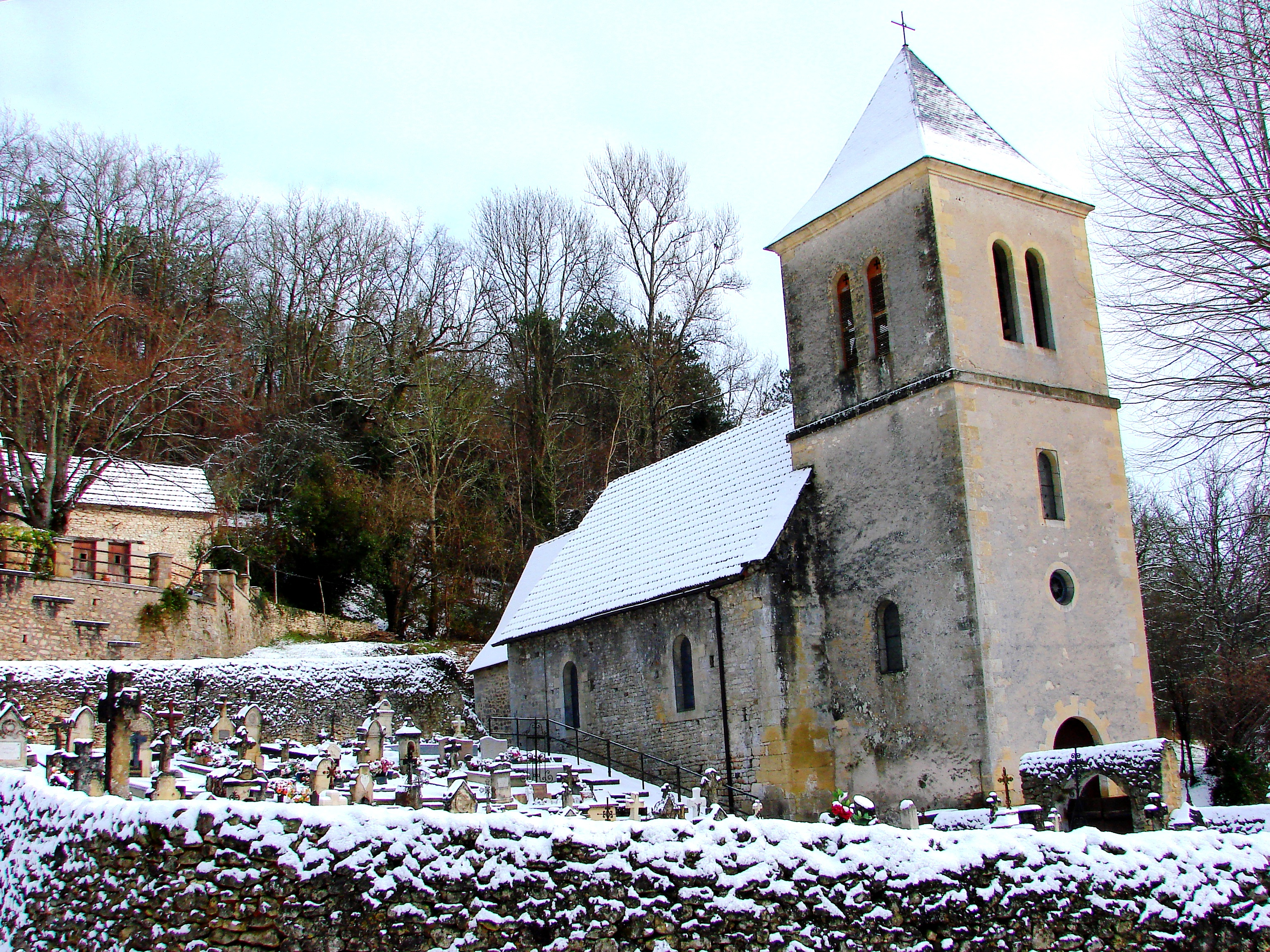
- Location of Mouzens
- Location within France Location within Nouvelle-Aquitaine
- Coordinates: 44°50′52″N 1°00′44″E
- Country: France
- Region: Nouvelle-Aquitaine
- Department: Dordogne
- Arrondissement: Sarlat-la-Canéda
- Canton: Vallée Dordogne
- Commune: Coux-et-Bigaroque-Mouzens
- Area^{1}: 8.14 km^{2} (3.14 sq mi)
- Elevation: 63 m (207 ft)
- Highest elevation: 229 m (751 ft)
- Lowest elevation: 45 m (148 ft)
- Population (2017): 233
  - Density: 28.6/km^{2} (74.1/sq mi)
- Time zone: UTC+01:00 (CET)
  - Summer (DST): UTC+02:00 (CEST)
- Postal code: 24220
- ^{1} French Land Register data, which excludes lakes, ponds, glaciers > 1 km^{2} (0.386 sq mi or 247 acres) and river estuaries.

Mouzens is a former commune in the Dordogne department in southwestern France. On 1 January 2016, it was merged into the new commune Coux-et-Bigaroque-Mouzens.

== See also ==
- Communes of the Dordogne department
