= Angélique (film) =

2013 French adventure film

- Film poster
- Directed by: Ariel Zeitoun
- Written by: Ariel Zeitoun; Philippe Blasband; Nadia Golon
- Based on: Angélique, the Marquise of the Angels by Anne Golon
- Starring: Nora Arnezeder; Gérard Lanvin
- Cinematography: Peter Zeitlinger
- Music by: Nathaniel Méchaly
- Production companies: Ajoz Films; EuropaCorp; Climax Films
- Distributed by: EuropaCorp Distribution
- Release date: 18 December 2013
- Running time: 113 minutes
- Country: France
- Language: French
- Budget: $16.5 million
- Box office: $996.304

Angélique is a 2013 French period drama and adventure film loosely based on the 1956 novel Angélique, the Marquise of the Angels by Anne Golon.

== Plot ==
In 17th-century France during the reign of King Louis XIV, Angélique de Sancé de Monteloup, a young woman from an impoverished noble family, is compelled into an arranged marriage with the wealthy but enigmatic Count Joffrey de Peyrac. Peyrac, older than Angélique, possesses a scarred face and a limp, and is widely rumored to be involved in alchemy and heretical practices.

Initially repulsed by her unconventional husband, Angélique gradually comes to appreciate and ultimately fall deeply in love with Joffrey. She discovers his profound intelligence, kindness, and talent as a scientist and musician. Their marriage blossoms as they build a life together at his estate in Toulouse, and Angélique bears him a child.

However, Joffrey's immense wealth, independent spirit, and unorthodox scientific pursuits attract the suspicion and envy of powerful figures, including the ambitious Archbishop of Toulouse and the young King Louis XIV, who views Joffrey's influence as a potential threat to his burgeoning absolute monarchy. These forces conspire against Joffrey, leading to his false accusation of sorcery and treason.

Joffrey is subsequently arrested and imprisoned, facing a trial orchestrated to ensure his condemnation and execution. Despite facing immense social and political pressure, Angélique bravely navigates the treacherous royal court in Paris in a desperate attempt to clear her husband's name. She endures threats, attempts on her life, and social degradation in her efforts to expose the conspiracy against him.

Despite Angélique's valiant endeavors, Joffrey is ultimately condemned and publicly executed. Devastated by grief and consumed by a thirst for revenge, Angélique finds herself cast out and forced to survive in the perilous Parisian underworld. Here, she reunites with Nicolas, a childhood friend who has become a prominent figure among the city's beggars and brigands. Angélique adapts to this harsh new reality, using her wit and beauty to navigate the dangers and indignities of her circumstances. This period of survival transforms her, forging a resilient and resourceful woman determined to regain her standing and exact vengeance upon those who destroyed her life and Joffrey's.

== Cast ==
- Nora Arnezeder as Angélique
  - Salomé Degeer as young Angélique
- Gérard Lanvin as Count Joffrey de Peyrac
- Tomer Sisley as Philippe de Plessis-Bellière
  - Noé de Pierpont as young Philippe de Plessis-Bellière
- Miguel Herz-Kestranek as Marquis de Plessis-Bellière
- Mathieu Kassovitz as Nicolas Merlot
- Simon Abkarian as the lawyer François Desgrez
- Matthieu Boujenah as Marquis of Andijos
- David Kross as Louis XIV
- Patrick Descamps as the archbishop of Toulouse
- Jean-Louis Sbille as the priest
- Fabrice Rodriguez
- Eric De Staercke as Baron of Sancé
- John Dobrynine
- Anna Orlando as Countess of Lazareff
- Julian Weigend as Fouquet
- Florence Coste as Margot
- Rainer Frieb as Mazarin
- Jacky Druaux as the judge
- Séverin Bavarel as the monk
- Bruno Georis as Gaston
- Václav Chalupa as courtisan
- Pavel Bousek as landlord
- Petr Klimes as Page Louvre
- Louis Storme as Colbert
- Jirí Pomeje
- Ales Linhart as Cantor, age 3
- Jiri Kalasza as Florimont, age 3
- Oliver Obermaier as Florimont, age 4
- Tomas Chmatal as servant

== Release ==
Angélique was released in France and Belgium on 18 December 2013, in Hungary on 17 April 2014 and Germany on 12 June 2014.

== Production ==
=== Development ===
The meeting between the novelist Anne Golon, author of the Angélique series , and the director Ariel Zeitoun took place ten years before filming, as Zeitoun had promised to make a remake of the Bernard Borderie's 1964 film Angélique, marquise des anges. "My attachment to this character comes from the fact that I wanted to tell a heartbreaking love story." The film was produced by Ajoz Films, in collaboration with the Belgian company Climax Films.

This new film adaptation, in the director's view, diverges significantly from the original film. He asserts it is more faithful to the books, which he describes as "much more rock'n'roll, more violent, more political and more modern."

=== Assignment of roles ===
Nora Arnezeder was chosen for the main role, famously played by Michèle Mercier in the 1964 film. This casting decision was revealed by Écran Total in July 2012. Gérard Lanvin was cast as Joffrey de Peyrac, the character portrayed by Robert Hossein in the earlier adaptation; Lanvin immediately accepted after reading the well-constructed script.

The role of the lawyer, previously played by Jean Rochefort, was given to Simon Abkarian. Additionally, the character of Plessis-Bellières, formerly depicted by Claude Giraud, was entrusted to Tomer Sisley.

=== Filming ===
Production for the 2013 Angélique film began on September 17, 2012, and concluded on November 25, 2012. Although initially planned for the Cité du Cinéma in Saint-Denis, filming ultimately took place at Barrandov Studios in Prague, Czech Republic, and in Austria. This change was reportedly a decision by Luc Besson due to budget considerations.

In November 2012, the film crew also shot in the province of Hainaut, Belgium, using the castles of Attre and Belœil for interior scenes. Exterior shots were filmed at Versailles.
