= Raymond Borderie =

French film producer

- Born: 30 March 1897; Paris, France
- Died: 12 July 1982 (aged 85); Paris, France
- Occupation: Film producer
- Years active: 1934–1968

Raymond Borderie (French pronunciation: [ʁɛmɔ̃ bɔʁdəʁi]; 30 March 1897 – 12 July 1982) was a French film producer. He produced more than 30 films between 1934 and 1968.

== Selected filmography ==
- Les Misérables (1934)
- The Ladies in the Green Hats (1937)
- The Rebel (1938)
- Education of a Prince (1938)
- The World Will Tremble (1939)
- At Your Command, Madame (1942)
- Colonel Pontcarral (1942)
- I Am with You (1943)
- Children of Paradise (1945)
- Alone in the Night (1945)
- The Last Penny (1946)
- The Cupboard Was Bare (1948)
- Five Red Tulips (1949)
- The Lovers of Verona (1949)
- At the Grand Balcony (1949)
- Miquette (1950)
- Deburau (1951)
- Edward and Caroline (1951)
- Wolves Hunt at Night (1952)
- The Wages of Fear (1953)
- The Proud and the Beautiful (1953)
- Orient Express (1954)
- The Crucible (1957)
- La fièvre monte à El Pao (1959)
- Women Are Like That (1960)
- Ravishing (1960)
- Angélique, Marquise des Anges (1964)
- Marvelous Angelique (1965)
- Angelique and the King (1966)
- Diabolically Yours (1967)
- Le Samourai (1967)
