= Angélique (novel series) =

Series of historical adventure romance novels by Anne Golon

- Author: Anne Golon
- Country: France
- Language: French
- Genre: Adventure fiction, historical fiction, romance
- Published: 1957–1985
- Media type: Print (hardback and paperback)
- No. of books: 13

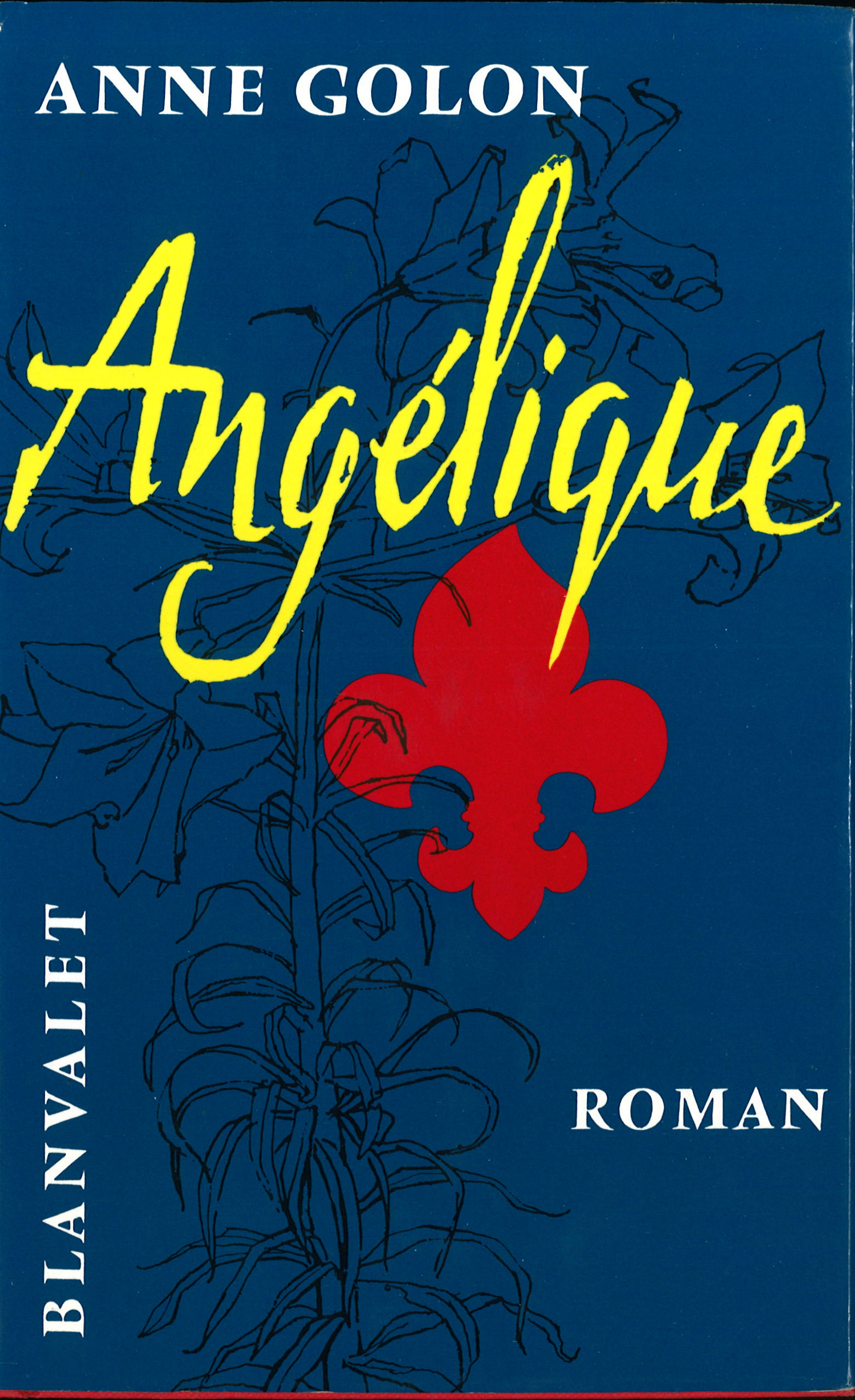
Anne Golon: Angélique. Blanvalet, Berlin 1956.

Angélique is a series of thirteen historical adventure romance novels written by French author Anne Golon. Originally published from 1957 to 1985, the novels have reportedly sold 150 million copies worldwide and have been adapted into six feature films, several theatre productions, a Japanese manga series, and a French "global manga" comic book series. Only ten of the thirteen novels have been translated into English.

== Plot ==
The eponymous protagonist, Angélique Sancé de Monteloup, is a 17th-century woman born into the provincial aristocracy in the west of France. In successive books, she marries at a young age the romantic and talented Joffrey de Peyrac, Count of Toulouse; (Note: The title of Count of Toulouse became extinct in the 13th century. King Louis XIV would revive it for his illegitimate son a bit later than the time of the novel's plot. Thus, the novel's depiction of an independent Count of Toulouse maintaining a court steeped in Occitan culture is completely fictional.) gets her domestic bliss destroyed when King Louis XIV has her husband executed on trumped up charges; descends into the underworld of Paris; emerges and through a turbulent second marriage gets admittance to the court at Versailles; loses her second husband in war, just as she had started to truly love him, and subsequently refuses to become the King's mistress; finds that her first husband is after all alive but is hiding somewhere in the Mediterranean; sets out on a highly risky search, gets captured by pirates, sold into slavery in Crete, taken into the harem of the King of Morocco, stabs the King when he tries to have sex with her, and stages a daring escape along with a French slave who becomes her lover; gets back to France, only to be put under house arrest in her ancestral home and raped by rampaging royal soldiers, which arouses the province to a rebellion which is brutally put down; finds refuge with a Huguenot family and – just as they are threatened by the Revocation of the Edict of Nantes – is saved in the nick of time by her long-lost first husband appearing at La Rochelle and taking them all to New France in his ship; and also being reunited with her children, whom she had thought dead but were alive and well in New France. Then follow many more adventures in colonial North America – specifically, in Quebec (then known as the colony of Canada, part of New France), and French Acadia – involving French and English settlers, tribal natives and pirates.

== Novels ==
- Angélique: Marquise of the Angels (Angélique, marquise des anges, 1957) (Note: The first two novels were originally published in France as a single 800-plus page volume titled Angélique.)
- Angélique: The Road to Versailles (Angélique: le Chemin de Versailles, 1958)
- Angélique and the King (Angélique et le Roy, 1959)
- Angélique and the Sultan (Indomptable Angélique, 1960) (Note: Literally translated as "Indomitable Angélique" or "Untamable Angélique". Also published in English as Angélique in Barbary.)
- Angélique in Revolt (Angélique se révolte, 1961)
- Angélique in Love (Angélique et son amour, 1961)
- The Countess Angélique (Angélique et le Nouveau Monde, 1964) (Note: Literally translated as "Angélique and the New World".)
- The Temptation of Angélique (La Tentation d'Angélique, 1966)
- Angélique and the Demon (Angélique et la Démone, 1972)
- Angélique and the Ghosts (Angélique et le Complot des Ombres, 1976) (Note: Literally translated as "Angélique and the Conspiracy of Shadows".)
- Angélique à Québec (1980)
- Angélique, la Route de l'Espoir (1984)
- La Victoire d'Angélique (1985)

== Adaptations ==
=== Films ===
The first four novels were adapted into a series of five films directed by Bernard Borderie in the 1960s, in a co-production between France, Italy, and Germany. The films starred Michèle Mercier as Angélique and Robert Hossein as Jeoffrey de Peyrac.

- Angélique, marquise des anges (1964)
- Merveilleuse Angélique (1965)
- Angélique et le Roy (1966)
- Indomptable Angélique (1967)
- Angélique et le Sultan (1968)

A new film adaptation of the first novel was directed by Ariel Zeitoun in 2013. It starred Nora Arnezeder as Angélique and Gérard Lanvin as Joffrey de Peyrac.

- Angélique (2013)

=== Manga ===
A manga series, Angélique (アンジェリク, Anjeriku), written and illustrated by Toshie Kihara, was serialized in the Japanese shōjo manga (girls' comics) magazine Princess from 1977 to 1979. It was later collected as five tankōbon (book volumes) by the Japanese publisher Akita Shoten.

A "global manga" series, Angélique, written by Oliver Milhaud and illustrated by Dara, was published as three graphic novels by the French publisher Casterman from 2015 to 2016.

=== Theatre ===
Two musicals, inspired by the 1977 manga adaptation and directed by Yukihiro Shibata, were staged at the Takarazuka Grand Theatre and the Tokyo Takarazuka Theatre in Japan in 1980. The first, Anjeriku: Honō no Koi no Monogatari (アンジェリク 炎の恋の物語; "Angélique: A Tale of the Flames of Love"), was performed by the all-female Takarazuka Revue's Moon Troupe. The second, Aoki Bara no Marusu: Anjeriku II (青き薔薇の軍神 アンジェリクII; "The Blue Rose of Mars: Angélique II"), was performed by the Snow Troupe.

A play, Angélique, marquise des anges, directed by Robert Hossein, was staged at the Palais des Sports in Paris, France, from 1995 to 1996. It starred Cécile Bois as Angélique, with Hossein reprising his 1960s film role as Joffrey de Peyrac.

Another musical, Angelika, was staged at the Broadway Theatre in Prague, Czech Republic, in 2007, 2010, 2016, and 2018.

== See also ==
- Suzanne du Plessis-Bellière, the alleged inspiration for Angélique's character
