= Claude Giraud =

French actor (1936–2020)

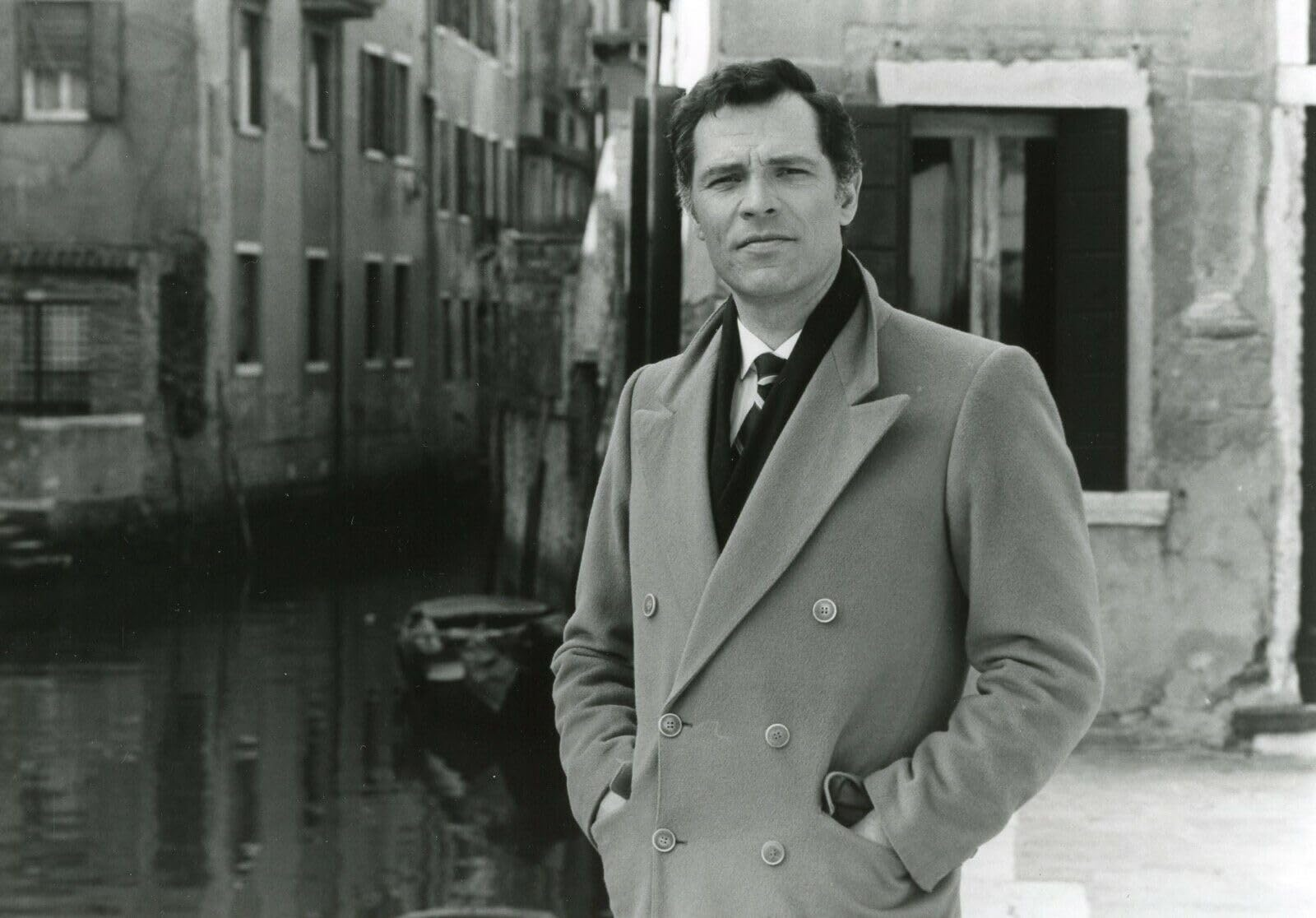
Claude Giraud in the TV movie Venise en hiver, 1982.

Claude Pierre Edmond Giraud (French pronunciation: [klod pjɛʁ ɛdmɔ̃ ʒiʁo]; 5 February 1936 in Chamalières – 3 November 2020 in Saint-Priest-des-Champs) was a French actor.

== Career ==
Claude Giraud studied with Tania Balachova at the Théâtre du Vieux-Colombier; Berthe Bovy and Jean Meyer at the École de la rue Blanche (École nationale supérieure des arts et techniques du théâtre, ENSATT). In November 1957 he was accepted as a student at CNSAD Conservatoire national supérieur d'art dramatique, where he studied with Jean Debucourt and Fernand Ledoux. Upon his graduation he was the first male student to win all three categories during the Concourse (Classical Comedy, Modern Comedy, Tragedy). In 1962 he was the first recipient of the newly created Prix Gérard Philipe. He was engaged at the Comédie Française in 1962 as a pensionnaire. Besides his debut role as Valère in Molière's The Miser, he played Arsace in Corneille's Bérénice, and the narrator in the stage adaptation of André Gide's short story Le retour de l'enfant prodigue (The Return of the Prodigal Son). Disappointed that he was only cast in small roles, he left the Comédie Française after a few months to start his film career. He played the leading role as Capitaine Langlois in François Leterrier's movie adaptation of Jean Giono's novel A King Without Distraction in 1962. He was Oedipus in the film adaptation of Jean Cocteau's The Infernal Machine. He joined the Compagnie Marie Bell to play a US tour in New York City, Boston, Washington D.C., and Princeton in October–November 1963. For his presentation of Hippolite in Phèdre and Titus in Bérénice at The Brooks Atkinson Theatre on Broadway, he was awarded the Theater World Award. He played the role of the soldier Georges in Roger Vadim's Circle of Love, a film adaptation of Arthur Schnitzler's scandalous play La Ronde (play). Between 1964 and 1966, Claude Giraud played the part of Philippe de Plessis-Bellières beside Michèle Mercier in three Angélique films: Angélique, Marquise des Anges, Marvelous Angelique, and Angelique and the King. He returned to the Comédie Française in 1972 and became the 460th sociétaire in 1976. He left again in 1982 to join Jean-Laurent Cochet's newly created Théâtre Hébertot.

Giraud gained fame in TV series as hero Morgan/Jacques de Saint-Hermine in the adventure series Les Compagnons de Jéhu by Michel Drach adapted from the eponymous novel by Alexandre Dumas. Bernard Toublanc-Michel engaged him in 1967 for the role of d'Aulnay in Adolphe ou l'âge tendre. The TV series Les rois maudits, where he played the role of Sir Roger Mortimer, was another huge success. In 1973, he played the fictional Arab revolutionary leader Mohamed Larbi Slimane, who poses as Rabbi Zeiligman in The Mad Adventures of Rabbi Jacob with Louis de Funès. In the TV movie Mamie Rose (1976) he played Claude Jade's husband Régis, whose marriage is saved by an au-pair granny played by Gisèle Casadesus.

Other TV series include Mathias Sandorf (1979), in which he played corrupt banker Silas Toronthal, based on Jules Verne's eponymous novel.

== Personal life and death ==
Giraud married Catherine Marquand (1943-2012), a fellow acting student at the Conservatoire, in 1963. They had a son, Louis (*1963), and a daughter, Marianne (*1966), who is also an actress and married to French actor and director Jean Martinez.

Since 1987, he lived in Vernadel near Saint-Priest-des-Champs in Auvergne, where he owned a Connemara stud farm, Haras du Boissis.

Claude Giraud died age 84 on 3 November 2020 in Saint-Priest-des-Champs and was buried there on 7 November 2020.

== Theater ==
Year	Title	Author	Director	Role	Name of Theater	Notes
1962	Bérénice	Jean Racine		Arsace	Comédie-Française	17 performances
1964	Qui a peur de Virginia Woolf ?	Edward Albee	Franco Zeffirelli	Nick	Théâtre de la Renaissance	
1962–64	Phèdre	Jean Racine	Raymond Gérôme	Hippolyte	Théâtre du Gymnase Marie Bell	Claude Giraud was awarded the Theatre World Award for his role on Broadway Oct.-Nov. 1963
1967	La Promesse	Aleksei Arbuzov	Michel Fagadau		Théâtre de la Gaîté-Montparnasse	
1969	Macbeth	William Shakespeare	Jean Meyer		Théâtre des Célestins, Lyon	
1969	Le Gardien (Pinter) (The Caretaker)	Harold Pinter	Jean-Laurent Cochet	Mick	Théâtre de Paris, previously called Théâtre Moderne	
1971	Le Gardien (Pinter) (The Caretaker)	Harold Pinter	Jean-Laurent Cochet	Mick	Théâtre des Célestins, Lyon	Tournées Herbert-Karsenty
1972	Tu étais si gentil quand tu étais petit	Jean Anouilh	Jean Anouilh and Roland Piétri	Égisthe	Théâtre Antoine-Simone Berriau	
1972	Œdipe roi, Œdipe à Colone	Sophocles	Jean-Paul Roussillon		Comédie-Française at The Festival d'Avignon	
1972	Richard III	William Shakespeare, adapted by Jean-Louis Curtis	Terry Hands	Édouard IV	Comédie-Française	
1973	L'Impromptu de Versailles	Molière	Pierre Dux		Comédie-Française	
1973	Les Caprices de Marianne	Alfred de Musset	Jean-Laurent Cochet	Octave	Comédie-Française	
1974	La Nostalgie, camarade	François Billetdoux	Jean-Paul Roussillon		Comédie-Française (Odéon)	
1974	Coriolan	William Shakespeare	Jean Meyer		Festival de Lyon	
1975	Horace	Pierre Corneille	Jean-Pierre Miquel	Curiace	Comédie-Française	
1976	La Nuit des rois (Twelfth Night)	William Shakespeare	Terry Hands	Antonio	Comédie-Française (Odéon)	
1976	Cyrano de Bergerac	Edmond Rostand	Jean-Paul Roussillon	Christian	Comédie-Française (Odéon)	
1976	Le Misanthrope	Molière	Jean-Laurent Cochet		Festival de Sarlat	
1976	Lorenzaccio	Alfred de Musset	Franco Zeffirelli	Scoroncocolo	Comédie-Française	
1977	Les Bacchantes	Euripide	Michael Cacoyannis	Penthée	Comédie-Française (Odéon)	
1977	Doit-on le dire ?	Eugène Labiche	Jean-Laurent Cochet	Gargaret	Comédie-Française	
1978–1979	La Trilogie de la villégiature	Carlo Goldoni	Giorgio Strehler	Leonardo	Comédie-Française (Odéon)	
1979	Le Malade imaginaire	Molière	Jean-Laurent Cochet	Béralde	Comédie-Française	
1980	Simul et singulis – 1ère période 1680–1780		Simon Eine		Comédie-Française	
1980	La Révolte	Auguste Villiers de l'Isle-Adam	Alain Halle-Halle	Félix	Comédie-Française	
1981	Médée	Euripide	Jean Gillibert	Créon	Comédie-Française	Festival d'Avignon
1983	29 degrés à l'ombre	Eugène Labiche	Jean-Laurent Cochet		Théâtre Hébertot	
1983	Moi (Labiche)	Eugène Labiche	Jean-Laurent Cochet		Théâtre Hébertot	
1983	Le Misanthrope	Molière	Jean-Laurent Cochet		Théâtre Hébertot	
1987	Ponce Pilate, procureur de Judée	Jean-Marie Pélaprat	Robert Manuel		Performed on cruise liner Mermoz (later renamed MV Serenade)	
1990	La Cerisaie	Anton Chekhov	Jacques Rosny		Théâtre de la Madeleine	
1990	L'Aiglon	Edmond Rostand	Jean-Luc Tardieu		Festival d'Anjou	
1992	Chantecler	Edmond Rostand	Jean-Paul Lucet		Théâtre antique de Fourvière	
1997	Dimanche prochain	Pierre Charras	Gérard Maro		Théâtre de l'Œuvre	
1998	Horace	Pierre Corneille	Marion Bierry		Théâtre de l'Œuvre	
2000	La Parisienne	Henry Becque	Jean-Laurent Cochet			
2005	Charlotte Corday	Daniel Colas	Daniel Colas		Petit-Hébertot	

== Filmography ==
Year	Title	English Title	Director	Role	Notes
1963	Un roi sans divertissement	A King Without Distraction	François Leterrier	Le capitaine Langlois	Screenplay by Jean Giono, based on his eponymous novel
1963	La Machine infernale	The Infernal Machine (play)	Claude Loursais	Œdipe	Television film
1964	Cinna (Corneille)	Cinna (play)	Jean Kerchbron	Cinna	Pierre Corneille
1964	Angélique, Marquise des Anges	Angélique, Marquise des Anges	Bernard Borderie	Philippe de Plessis-Bellière	Based on the eponymous novel by Anne Golon and Serge Golon
1964	La Ronde	Circle of Love	Roger Vadim	Georges	Based on La Ronde (play) by Arthur Schnitzler
1965	Merveilleuse Angélique	Merveilleuse Angélique	Bernard Borderie	Philippe de Plessis-Bellière	Based on the novel by Anne Golon and Serge Golon
1966	Angélique et le Roy	Angelique and the King	Bernard Borderie	Philippe de Plessis-Bellière	Based on the eponymous novel by Anne Golon and Serge Golon
1968	Adolphe ou l'Âge tendre		Bernard Toublanc-Michel	d'Aulnay	Based on the 1816 French novel Adolphe by Benjamin Constant
1968	Phèdre'' (film, 1968)		Pierre Jourdan	Hippolyte	Based on the tragedy by Jean Racine
1973	Les Aventures de Rabbi Jacob	The Mad Adventures of Rabbi Jacob	Gérard Oury	Mohamed Larbi Slimane / Rabbi Zeiligman	Golden Globe nominee for Best Foreign Film (France)
1974	La guerre du pétrole n'aura pas lieu	La guerre du pétrole n'aura pas lieu	Souheil Ben-Barka	Tourner	Entered into the 9th Moscow International Film Festival.
1989	La Folle Journée ou le Mariage de Figaro		Roger Coggio	Le comte Almaviva	
1989	Suivez cet avion		Patrice Ambard	Laporte	
1994	L'Ange noir		Jean-Claude Brisseau	Romain Bousquet	

=== TV films and series ===
- 1963: La Machine infernale by Jean Cocteau, directed by Claude Loursais: Œdipe
- 1964: Le Commandant Watrin, adapted from the eponymous novel by Armand Lanoux, directed by Jacques Rutman: François Soubeyrac
- 1965: Cinna by Pierre Corneille, directed by Jean Kerchbron: Cinna
- 1966: Les Compagnons de Jéhu, adapted from the eponymous novel by Alexandre Dumas, directed by Michel Drach : Morgan (Jacques de Saint-Hermine)
- 1967: Sébastien parmi les hommes (Belle, Sebastian and the Horses (TV Mini-series) by Cécile Aubry: Pierre Maréchal
- 1971: Tartuffe by Molière, directed by Marcel Cravenne: Cléante
- 1972: Les Rois maudits by Claude Barma : Lord Roger Mortimer (2 episodes, 1973: Le lis et le lion; La louve de France)
- 1974: Madame Bovary by Pierre Cardinal : Rodolphe Boulanger
- 1975: Mamie Rose (TV film) by Pierre Goutas : Régis
- 1976: Milady after the eponymous novel by Paul Morand, directed by François Leterrier: Grumbach
- 1977: Le Loup blanc after the eponymous novel by Paul Féval, directed by Jean-Pierre Decourt: Hervé de Vaunoy
- 1977: Richelieu, le cardinal de velours by Jean-Pierre Decourt: La Valette (4 episodes)
- 1979: Mathias Sandorf by Jean-Pierre Decourt: Silas Toronthal
- 1979: La Trilogie de la villégiature by Carlo Goldoni, directed by Giorgio Strehler: Leonardo
- 1981: Les Fiancées de l'Empire by Jacques Doniol-Valcroze: Maxime d'Aurillac
- 1982: Venise en hiver by Jacques Doniol-Valcroze: André Merrest
- 1983: L'Homme de la nuit by Juan Luis Buñuel: Franck
- 1986: À nous les beaux dimanches by Robert Mazoyer: Charles-Edgar Moreau
- 1988: Les Cinq Dernières Minutes, by Gilles Combet, 1 episode (Un modèle de genre): Paul
- 1992: La Cavalière (TV film in 2 parts) by Philippe Monnier (part 2): William Gordon-Thomas
- 1993: Des héros ordinaires by Yvan Butler (1 episode, Les Saigneurs): Plessis
- 1994: Les Cordier, juge et flic (Une mort programmée): Ackmann
- 2000: Julie Lescaut (Soupçon d'euthanasie): Danteille
- 2000: Une femme d'honneur by Philippe Monnier: Michel Durieux
- 2005: Le Fantôme du lac by Philippe Niang: Victor Lanzi

== Recordings (selected) ==
1965, La Compagnie Marie Bell, Phèdre (Racine)
