= Ariel Zeitoun =

French film producer, director, and screenwriter

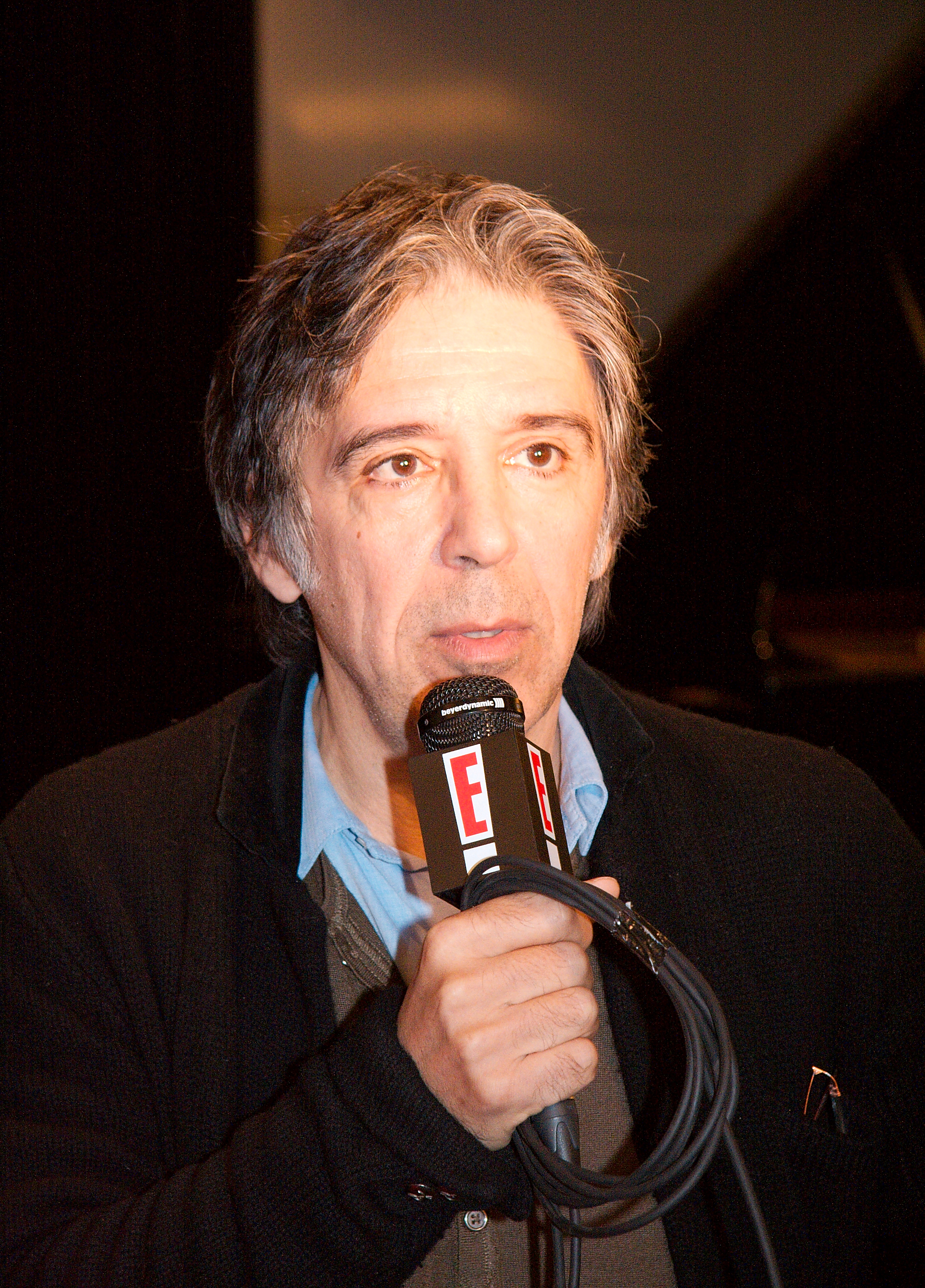
- Ariel Zeitoun in 2007
- Born: 26 September 1949 (age 77); Tunisia
- Occupations: Director; Producer

Ariel Zeitoun (born 26 September 1949) is a French film director and producer.

== Biography ==
Born to a family of Tunisian Jews, Zeitoun started as a producer in 1979 with L'école est finie. He found success by collaborating with directors Francis Girod (The Lady Banker, 1980) and Alexandre Arcady (Le Grand Pardon, 1982). In 1984, he became a director himself with Souvenirs, Souvenirs. The film was a box-office success, selling one million admissions in France.

His next film as a director, Saxo (1987), was commercially unsuccessful despite a good critical reception. His third, Le Nombril du monde, which starred comedian Michel Boujenah in a dramatic role, disappointed both commercially and critically. Zeitoun then moved away from personal films to attempt more commercial comedies. In 1997, he directed Une femme très très très amoureuse, starring TV host Nagui, which was a box-office disaster; his next films, XXL (1997), starring Boujenah and Gérard Depardieu, and Bimboland (1998), again with Depardieu, were also unsuccessful.

Zeitoun then began a collaboration with Luc Besson's studio, EuropaCorp. He returned to success by directing Yamakasi for that company, which was a box-office hit in 2001. He was involved as a producer in the films Gangsters (2002), directed by Olivier Marchal, and Blueberry, by Jan Kounen.

His return to directing, Le Dernier gang (2007), was unsuccessful. In 2013, he directed the historical drama Angélique, loosely based on the book Angélique, the Marquise of the Angels by Anne and Serge Golon, which was a major commercial failure. In later years, he focused on producing, working on films that included Colombiana (2011), Shut In (2016) and Kursk (2018)

== Selected filmography ==
- 1980: The Lady Banker (producer)
- 1982: Le Grand Pardon (producer)
- 1984: Souvenirs, Souvenirs
- 1987: Saxo
- 1988: L'enfance de l'art (producer)
- 1990: Baby Blood (producer)
- 1993: Le Nombril du monde
- 1997: Une femme très très très amoureuse
- 1997: XXL
- 1998: Bimboland
- 2001: Yamakasi
- 2007: Le Dernier Gang
- 2011: Colombiana (producer)
- 2013: Angélique
- 2016: Shut In (producer)
- 2018: Kursk (producer)
