= Marvelous Angelique =

1965 film

- French film poster
- Directed by: Bernard Borderie
- Written by: Claude Brulé; Bernard Borderie; Francis Cosne
- Dialogue by: Daniel Boulanger
- Based on: Angélique: The Road to Versailles by Anne and Serge Golon
- Produced by: Francis Cosne
- Starring: Michèle Mercier; Claude Giraud; Jean Rochefort; Jean-Louis Trintignant; Giuliano Gemma; Claire Maurier; Noël Roquevert
- Cinematography: Henri Persin
- Edited by: Christian Gaudin
- Music by: Michel Magne
- Production companies: Francos Films; Compagnie Industrielle et Commerciale Cinématographique Films Borderie; Gloria Film; Fono Roma
- Distributed by: S.N. Prodis (France); Gloria Film (West Germany); Euro International Films (Italy)
- Release date: 7 July 1965
- Running time: 105 minutes
- Countries: France; West Germany; Italy
- Language: French
- Box office: 10,354,430 tickets

Marvelous Angelique (French: Merveilleuse Angélique) is a 1965 historical romantic adventure film directed by Bernard Borderie. It is the second film in the Angélique series, based upon the novels by Anne and Serge Golon, and a sequel to Angélique, Marquise des Anges. It was made as a co-production between France, Italy and West Germany.

It was made at the Billancourt Studios in Paris and the Cinecitta Studios in Rome. Location shooting took place at Versailles. The sets were designed by art director René Moulaert.

== Synopsis ==
After the execution of Jeoffrey de Peyrac, Angélique finds refuge at the Cour des Miracles and the boss Calembredaine; he turns out to be her childhood friend and first love Nicolas. With his help, she finds her children. After a fight between two rival gangs, Nicolas is shot and Angélique is arrested and sent to the Châtelet. She asks the captain to let her go rescue her children; he agrees provided she comes back to spend the night with him. Angélique goes to the headquarters of the Grand Coërse and rescues her children. She brings them to Barbe and asks her to take care of them because she has a debt to pay. Angélique returns to the Châtelet where the captain is waiting for her. He tries to kiss her, but they struggle, and he falls down. She escapes and flees to Barbe who now works in an old run-down inn called "Le coq Hardi".

After persuading the owner 'Maître Bourjus' to employ her, Angélique renames the inn "Le masque rouge"; it is a big hit in Paris. One day she meets her old enemy, Monsieur, brother of the king, accompanied by his noblemen. A tragedy occurs, "Le masque rouge" burns to the ground and Angélique swears revenge. She calls on her friend Claude le Petit aka "Le poète crotté". He writes pamphlets in which they accuse the noblemen surrounding Monsieur.

The king disapproves of what his brother did but he doesn't like what the poet is doing and has him hanged, another death on Angelique's conscience. He sends his best policeman to her, the former lawyer of Jeoffrey, Desgrez, who realizes she is planning to kill herself. He promises her a license to make and sell chocolate and 50.000 livres as compensation for the loss of "Le masque rouge", on the condition that she accepts that the poet Crotte's death was not her fault and that she stops publishing the remaining pamphlets so that Monsieur's name isn't mentioned.

In her new establishment, she then encounters her cousin Philippe de Plessis-Bellières. They have a passionate affair, but Angélique wants him to marry her so she blackmails him with an old secret. Eventually Philippe asks her to be his wife and he introduces her to the court.

== Cast ==
- Michèle Mercier as Angélique Sancé de Monteloup
- Giuliano Gemma as Nicolas Merlot aka Calembredaine
- Claude Giraud as Philippe de Plessis-Bellières
- Jean Rochefort as François Desgrez
- Jean-Louis Trintignant as Claude le Petit, Le poète croté
- Noël Roquevert as Bourjus
- Jacques Toja as Louis XIV
- Charles Regnier as Conan Bécher
- Robert Porte as Monsieur brother of the king
- Philippe Lemaire as De Vardes
- François Maistre as Prince de Condé
- Claire Maurier as Ninon de Lenclos
- Roberto as Barcarole
- Denise Provence as Barbe
- Ernst Schröder as capitaine du Châtelet
- Rosalba Neri as La Polak
- Henri Cogan as Cul-de-Bois
- Serge Marquand as Jactance
- Gino Martunaro as Rodogone L'Egyptien
- Michaël Munzeras Beau Garçon
- Renate Ewert as Margot
- Élisabeth Ercy as Rosine
- Patrick Lemaître as Flipot
- Guido Alberti as Le grand Mathieu
- Jacques Hilling as Mr Molines
- Dominique Viriot as Linot
- Pietro Tordi as Le Grand Coërse
- Robert Hoffmann as Chevalier de Lorraine

Voice dubbing:

- Jacques Thébault: voice of Giuliano Gemma
- Philippe Noiret: voix d'Ernst Schröder
- Rosy Varte: voice of Rosalba Neri

== Filmography Angélique ==
- 1964: Angélique, Marquise des Anges de Bernard Borderie starring Michèle Mercier, Robert Hossein, Jean Rochefort
- 1964: Marvelous Angelique by Bernard Borderie starring Michèle Mercier, Claude Giraud, Jean Rochefort
- 1965: Angelique and the King by Bernard Borderie starring Michèle Mercier, Jean Rochefort
- 1967: Untamable Angelique by Bernard Borderie starring Michèle Mercier, Robert Hossein
- 1968: Angelique and the Sultan by Bernard Borderie starring Michèle Mercier, Robert Hossein

== Bibliography ==
- Klossner, Michael. The Europe of 1500-1815 on Film and Television: A Worldwide Filmography of Over 2550 Works, 1895 Through 2000. McFarland & Company, 2002.
