= Rita Barisse =

British journalist, writer and translator (1917–2001)

- Born: 12 May 1917; Berlin
- Died: 25 April 2001
- Occupations: Writer, journalist, translator
- Spouse: Jean Bruller
- Writing career
- Pen name: Vercors
- Notable work: Sylva (translation)

Rita Barisse (12 May 1917 – 25 April 2001) was a British journalist, writer and translator. She was the second wife of the writer Jean Bruller, also known as Vercors, and collaborated with him on works released under that pen name.

== Biography ==
Rita Barisse met her future husband at a PEN International banquet in Copenhagen in 1948, where she represented Britain. She married him in 1957 and subsequently accompanied him on their journeys. In Mexico in 1962 they were received by Dominique Eluard, wife of Paul Eluard, with whom they collaborated on the project, To the Memory of the Martyr Fighters of the Warsaw Ghetto: Thirty-Five Drawings by Maurice Mendjisky - An Unpublished Poem by Paul Eluard - A Text by Vercors.

As a journalist, Barisse wrote articles on art, theater and film. She donated her body to science.

== Works ==
Rita Barisse is known for her collaboration in the works of her husband under the pen name Vercors. This includes the translation and adaptation of Why I ate my father by Roy Lewis, discovered by Théodore Monod, and Oh! Hollywood by Christopher Hampton (1985). She is credited with adapting Monsieur La Souris written by Georges Simenon for the film Midnight Episode (1950). In 1954, she refused to translate the work of Andre Siegfried because of how the book dealt with the Jewish minority in the United States.

Barisse provided English translation of the following Vercors works:

- Denatured Animals ( Macmillan & Company, 1954)
- The Silence of the Sea ( Frederick Muller, 1957)
- The Freedom of December ( GP Putnam's Sons, 1961)
- Sylva (GP Putnam's Sons, 1962) (Hugo Award finalist, 1963)
- Quota (GP Putnam's Sons, 1966)
- The Battle of Silence (Collins, 1968)

She was also responsible for other translations, including:

- Angélique, the Marquise of the Angels (1959) by Anne and Serge Golon
- Angélique and the King (1959) by Anne Golon and Serge Golon
- Zao Wou-Ki by Claude Roy (1959)
- My Mother's Castle (1957) by Marcel Pagnol
- Childhood Memories by Marcel Pagnol (1962)
- The Time of the Secrets by Marcel Pagnol (1962)

She was the author of:

- "Theaters-clubs in London"
- "Travel to America with Vercors (1961-1962)"
- "Words of Vercors," preface (2004)
