= Gérard Roubichou =

French educator and diplomat

Gérard J. Roubichou
- Born: 11 July 1939 (age 87); Marseille, France
- Education: University of Lausanne (doctorate)
- Occupations: educator, diplomat, literary critic

Gérard J. Roubichou (born 11 July 1939) is a French educator and diplomat, He has made significant contributions to French culture and language in various assignments as an educator, administrator, diplomat, and as an art and literary critic in France and abroad, namely in the United States.

== Biography ==
Roubichou was born 11 July 1939 in Marseille. After graduating in 1963 from École Normale Supérieure de la rue d'Ulm in Paris as an Agrégé de lettres classiques, he taught in Amiens, France.

In 1966–1967 he was invited by the University of California, Berkeley to teach contemporary French literature, primarily the French Nouveau Roman (New Novel). In August 1967, he was appointed as a lecturer in French language by the French government at Moscow Lomonosov University in the former Soviet Union, to train Russian teachers of French. In 1969, he returned to the United States when he was offered an assistant professorship at the University of Virginia, in Charlottesville. In the spring of 1973, he was appointed in New Orleans, Louisiana, by the French Ministry of Foreign Affairs as cultural attaché for seven southern states. In cooperation with the local authorities on joint projects, he oversaw cultural, educational and French language training programs, primarily CODOFIL in Louisiana.

There, he completed, for the University of Lausanne, Switzerland, his doctoral dissertation on Claude Simon, the French novelist who was not very well known in the 1960s and 1970s. His dissertation, which was the first scholarly work in French on Simon in Europe, was published into a book in 1976. Simon was awarded the Nobel Prize in literature in 1985.

Roubichou was promoted in August 1976 to Deputy Cultural Counselor of the French Embassy in the United States, in residence in New York City. His mission was to facilitate partnerships between universities and other institutions in France and in the United States, and foster exchanges of rising and established French and American leaders in various fields, ranging from the Arts and allied fields, the Humanities, Social Sciences and Economics.

Early in 1981, he was transferred to Paris within the French Ministry of Foreign Affairs, (Quai d'Orsay), as an Advisor to the Director of Cultural, Scientific and Technical Relations (DGRCT) in charge of all French cultural, educational, scientific and research programs worldwide, and in 1982, he joined a team of diplomats at the Inspection Générale of the Quai d'Orsay, which was responsible for overseeing the operations of French Embassies, including the network of about 400 French schools abroad.

In 1985, he was honored as a Knight, in the French National Order of Merit, and in March 1986, he was appointed as Advisor in the Cabinet of the French Minister of Foreign Affairs. In May 1989, he was elected president, chief executive officer, of the Lycée Français de New York, an American institution founded in 1935 whose mission was to provide children of French expatriates, American families and children from many nations a French curriculum with a solid American component. From 1995 until 2001, he was also President of the Société des Professeurs Français et Francophones en Amérique (SPFFA), an American foundation established in 1904 in New York City.

In recognition of his contributions and long-term commitment to French culture and education in France, in the United States and abroad, he was appointed as an Officer of the Palmes Académiques in 1993 and received as a Knight in the National Order of the French Legion of Honor in 1994.

During his second stay in New York, he was a regular voluntary contributor in France-Amérique. He wrote the first article in French about the American sculptor Seward J. Johnson Jr. whom he had met in the 1970s. In 2003, he wrote the first in-depth study of Seward Johnson's "impressionist" works in three-dimensions, inspired by French Impressionists, which were and still are installed at Grounds For Sculpture in New Jersey.

In 2002, the Quai d'Orsay had appointed him head of a team of five French independent experts to conduct an evaluation of the French comprehensive policy of cooperation between France and Bulgaria, from 1991 to 2001. In 2004, he joined the French section of the Franco-British Council and was its Secretary General from 2006 to 2011.

In 2011, he was elected Secretary General of the Comité d'Aménagement du 7ème Arrondissement in Paris, and since 2016, he has been its president. At the request of The Seward Johnson Atelier (TSJA), in New Jersey, he translated from French into English Créatures de Bronze, sculptures de Seward Johnson, a book which he had written in France in 2017 on the artist Seward Johnson and, in 2019, updated versions of the book were released successively in the United States by TSJA – in English in April, and in French in December, shortly before Seward Johnson's death, on March 10, 2020.

In April 2021, he published D'un Mur à l'autre, a book covering the history of Le Mur pour la Paix, a monument installed in 1999 on the Champ de Mars in Paris, and scheduled to be installed differently on the Avenue de Breteuil in Paris, in 2021, a project strongly challenged through a petition signed and endorsed by nearly 10,000 residents. He is currently very active on various projects envisioned by the City of Paris, focusing currently on the Champ de Mars, the Trocadéro and the Eiffel tower.

== Books ==
1967	Honoré de Balzac, Le Lys dans la Vallée, annotated version, Édition Bordas, Paris
1973	Michel Butor, La Modification, annotated version, Édition Bordas, Paris
1974	Boris Vian, L'écume des jours, Hachette, Paris.
1976	Lecture de l'Herbe de Claude Simon, Édition L'Âge d'Homme, Lausanne, Switzerland
1977	Les Francophones de Louisiane, Édition Entente, Paris
1999	Coup d'État à L'École, Politique, ambitions et règlements de comptes dans une communauté scolaire aux États-Unis, 1996–1998, New York
2003	Celebrating Culture, Essay on the Sculptures of J. Seward Johnson, Jr. Inspired by French Impressionist Paintings, New York (out of print)
2008	Une concession à perpétuité ? L'affaire du Mur pour la Paix 2000 (1999–2008) Aubin éditeur, Paris
2012	Le Mur pour la Paix et l'état de droit. L'affaire du Mur pour la Paix 2000 (2008–2012), Comité d'Aménagement du VIIe Arrondissement, Paris
2012	Meeting the Impressionists at Grounds For Sculpture, Seward Johnson, The Sculpture Foundation, Inc.
2014	Jacques Viot, Ambassadeur de France, Au Quai d'Orsay avec Jean François-Poncet, 1978–1981. Carnets privés d'un diplomate. Présentés et annotés par Gérard Roubichou, Éditions A. Pedone, Paris
2019	Créatures de Bronze, Sculptures de Seward Johnson, The Seward Johnson Atelier, Inc. Printed in France
2019	Seward Johnson and His Bronze Friends, Realism and Creative Imagination in Contemporary American Sculpture, The Seward Johnson Atelier, Inc., Hamilton, New Jersey
2021	D'un Mur à l'autre, L'affaire du Mur pour la Paix 2000 (2013–2021), Comité d'Aménagement du VIIe Arrondissement, Paris

== Selected articles in scholarly publications ==
1975
"Trois regards sur la Louisiane au XVlllème siècle", in Comptes rendus de l'Athénée Louisianais no. Années 1974–1975, pp. 48–57
1975
"Aspects de la phrase simonienne", in Claude Simon: analyse, théorie, Actes du Colloque de Cerisy la Salle, Collection 10/18, Paris, pp. 191–209. Bibliography produced by Gérard Roubichou (pp. 432–443)
1976
"Continu et discontinu ou l'hérétique alinéa (Notes sur la lecture d'Histoire), in Études Littéraires, "Claude Simon", Presses de l'université Laval, vol. 9, no 1, April 1976, pp. 125–136.
1980
"Claude Simon" in "The New Novel", A Critical Bibliography of French Literature, vol VI ("The Twentieth Century") edited by Douglas W. Alden and Richard A. Brooks, Syracuse University Press, pp. 1516–1522 (in English).
1981
"Histoire or the Serial Novel", in Orion Blinded, Essays on Claude Simon, published by Bucknell University Press, pp. 173–183 (in English).
1993
"La mémoire des mots (notes en marge d'une relecture de Claude Simon)", Claude Simon, chemins de la mémoire, textes, entretiens, manuscrits réunis par Mireille Calle-Gruber, Les éditions le Griffon d'Argile (Québec)/Presses universitaires de Grenoble (France), pp. 83–92.
1995
"La mémoire, l'écriture, le roman. Réflexions sur la production romanesque de Claude Simon", Les sites de l'écriture. Colloque Claude Simon, Queen's University, Ontario, Librairie A-G Nizet, Paris, pp. 93–104.

"Langage et roman: La stratégie de l'écriture dans l'œuvre de Claude Simon", Francographies, Actes du Colloque "Création et réalité d'expression française", Société des Professeurs Français et Francophones d'Amérique (SPFFA), Fordham University, March 1994, vol. 2, pp. 45–55

1998
"Stratégie du désir, stratégie du texte: une lecture de La vieille fille de Balzac", Francographies, Actes du Colloque "Création et réalité d'expression française," Société des Professeurs Français et Francophones d'Amérique (SPFFA) at Fordham University Francophones d'Amérique (SPFFA) March 1996. (November 1998, no. Spécial 2 Nouvelle Série, Tome I. pp. 185–192)

"L'enseignement français aux États-Unis, ou les langues ont-elles leur place dans le système?", Actes du Colloque 1996, Francographies no. Spécial 2 Nouvelle Série, Tome II, pp. 3–7.

1999
"Notre Societé, d'un siècle à l'autre", Francographies no. 8.
2000
"Sémiologie du hamburger: réflexions sur la symbolique du fast food", Francographies, no. 9, 2000, pp. 95-110
2003
"L'Europe de la culture et de l'éducatlon à l'heure de l'euro", Actes du sixième Colloque, 2002, Francographies, no. Special 4, Nouvelle Série, pp. 25–38.
