= Michèle Mercier =

French actress (born 1939)

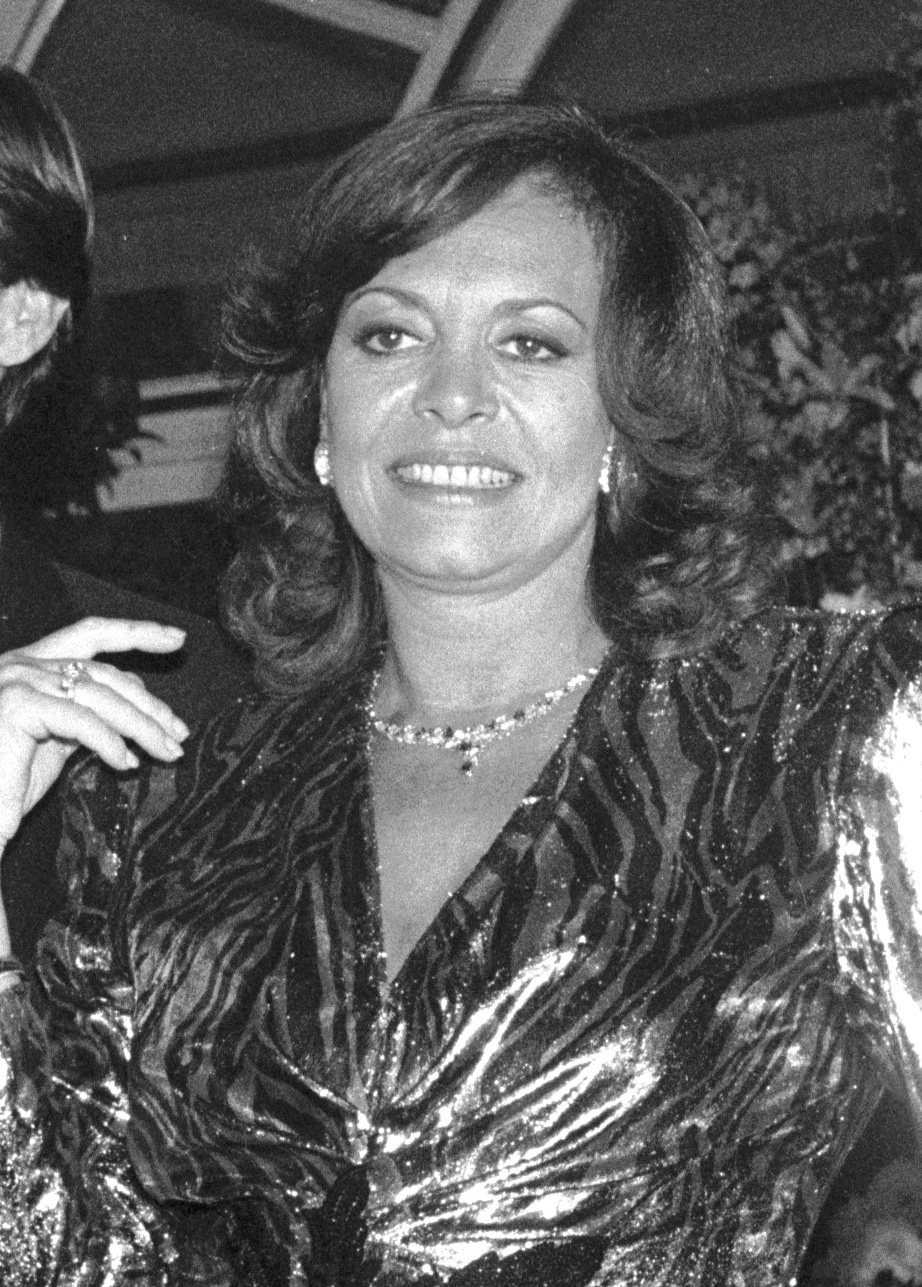
- Mercier in 1988
- Born: Jocelyne Yvonne Renée Mercier; 1 January 1939 (age 87); Nice, France
- Occupations: Actress; dancer; singer
- Years active: 1957–present
- Spouses: André Smagghe (m. 1961; div. 1967); Claude Bourillot (m. 1968; div. 1976)

Michèle Mercier (born 1 January 1939 as Jocelyne Yvonne Renée Mercier) is a French actress. In the course of her career she has worked with leading directors like François Truffaut, Jean-Pierre Melville, Jacques Deray, Dino Risi, Mario Monicelli, Mario Bava, Peter Collinson and Ken Annakin. Her leading men have included Marcello Mastroianni, Vittorio Gassman, Jean-Paul Belmondo, Jean Gabin, Charles Aznavour, Robert Hossein, Charles Bronson, Tony Curtis and Charlton Heston. She has appeared in over fifty films, and is best known for her starring role in Angelique, Marquise des Anges.

== Biography ==
Mercier was born into a wealthy family; her father was a French pharmacist and her mother Italian.

Mercier initially wanted to be a dancer. The circumstances of war made this difficult and her parents saw it as only a whim; however, her determination won through and she joined the "ballet-rats", as the dancers of the chorus are termed. She soon advanced to soloist in the Nice Opéra. At the age of 15 she met Maurice Chevalier, who predicted that she would be a success.

She moved to Paris aged 17, and first joined the troupe of Roland Petit, then the company of the "Ballets of the Eiffel Tower". Parallel to her career as dancer, Mercier studied acting under Solange Sicard. For her film début her birth name seemed too long and old-fashioned. It was suggested she take the name Michèle: this happened to be name of her younger sister, who had died at the age of five from typhoid fever. However, she adopted the name as a tribute to the actress Michèle Morgan.

After some romantic comedies and a small role in François Truffaut's Tirez sur le pianiste ("Shoot The Pianist", 1960), she worked in England and made some films in Italy, mainly with a small budget and usually playing women of easy virtue.

Mercier needed a role which could make her a star. In 1963, when it was decided to make a movie of the sensational novel Angélique, the Marquise of the Angels, she got her chance. Many actresses were approached to play the role of Angélique. Producer Francis Cosne wanted Brigitte Bardot for the part, but she refused. Annette Stroyberg was considered next, but judged not sufficiently well-known. Catherine Deneuve was too pale, Jane Fonda spoke French with an American accent, and Virna Lisi was busy in Hollywood. The most serious actress considered was Marina Vlady. She almost signed a contract, but Mercier won the role after trying out for it: she did not appreciate this very much because she was being treated like a beginner at a time when she was already well known in Italy. At the time she was contacted to play Angélique, she had already acted in over twenty films. During the next four years she made five sequels which enjoyed great success. However the role of Angelique was both a blessing and a curse. It catapulted her to almost instant stardom, rivalling Brigitte Bardot in celebrity and popularity, but the character overshadowed all other aspects of her career. By the end of the 1960s, the names "Angélique" and Michèle Mercier were synonymous.

In 1991 she was a member of the jury at the 17th Moscow International Film Festival.

Attempting to break free from the character of Angélique, Mercier played against Jean Gabin in The Thunder of God, directed by Denys de la Patellière. She then appeared with Robert Hossein in La Seconde Vérité, directed by Christian-Jaque. After this she left France and tried to restart her career in the United States, unfortunately without much success.

After a 14-year layoff, she returned in the 1998 film La Rumbera, directed by Piero Vivarelli. In 1999, having lost several million francs in a business venture, Mercier had serious financial problems. She even planned to sell the famous wedding gown of Angélique. The actress confessed in Nice-Matin: "I am ruined, I'll be obliged to sell part of my paintings, my furniture, my properties, my jewels and the costumes of Angélique". In 2002, at the Cannes Film Festival, she presented her second book of memoirs. Mercier was made a chevalier dans l'Ordre des Arts et des Lettres on 6 March 2006.

== Selected filmography ==
Year	Title	Role	Director	Notes
1957	Retour de manivelle	Jeanne	Denys de La Patellière	with Daniel Gélin, Michèle Morgan and Peter Van Eyck
1960	Shoot the Piano Player	Clarisse	François Truffaut	with Charles Aznavour, Marie Dubois and Nicole Berger...
1961	Goodbye Again	Third Maisie	Anatole Litvak	with Ingrid Bergman, Yves Montand and Anthony Perkins
1961	Fury at Smugglers' Bay	Louise Lejeune	John Gilling	with Peter Cushing, John Fraser and Bernard Lee
1961	The Wonders of Aladdin	Princess Zaiha	Henry Levin and Mario Bava	with Donald O'Connor, Fausto Tozzi, Vittorio De Sica and Mario Girotti
1962	Avenger of the Seven Seas	Jennifer	Domenico Paolella	with Richard Harrison and Roldano Lupi
1962	Roaring Years	Elvira Acquamano	Luigi Zampa	with Nino Manfredi, Gastone Moschin and Gino Cervi
1963	Shivers in Summer	Gigi	Luigi Zampa	with Vittorio Gassman and Philippe Leroy
1963	Black Sabbath	Rosy (episode "The telephone")	Mario Bava	with Lidia Alfonsi
1963	Magnet of Doom	Lou	Jean-Pierre Melville	with Jean-Paul Belmondo and Charles Vanel
1963	The Thursday	Elsa	Dino Risi	with Walter Chiari and Umberto D'Orsi
1963	I mostri	Maria (episode "L'oppio dei popoli")	Dino Risi	with Ugo Tognazzi
1964	A Global Affair	Lisette	Jack Arnold	with Bob Hope, Barbara Bouchet and Yvonne De Carlo
1964	High Infidelity	Clara (episode "Gente Moderna")	Mario Monicelli	
1964	Angélique, Marquise des Anges	Angélique	Bernard Borderie	with Robert Hossein, Jean Rochefort, Claude Giraud and Giuliano Gemma
1964	Marvelous Angelique	Angélique	Bernard Borderie	with Jean Rochefort, Claude Giraud and Giuliano Gemma
1964	Casanova 70	Noelle	Mario Monicelli	with Marcello Mastroianni, Virna Lisi, Marisa Mell and Marco Ferreri
1965	God's Thunder	Simone Leboucher	Denys de La Patellière	with Jean Gabin, Robert Hossein and Lilli Palmer
1966	Angelique and the King	Angélique	Bernard Borderie	Robert Hossein, Jacques Toja and Sami Frey
1966	The Second Twin	Nathalie Neuville, Medical student	Christian-Jaque	with Robert Hossein
1966	How I Learned to Love Women	Franziska	Luciano Salce	with Robert Hoffmann and Nadja Tiller
1966	Black Sun	Christine Rodier	Denys de La Patellière	with Daniel Gélin and Valentina Cortese
1967	The Oldest Profession	Brit (episode " L'Amour à l'âge de pierre")	Franco Indovina	
1967	Untamable Angelique	Angélique	Bernard Borderie	with Robert Hossein
1968	Angelique and the Sultan	Angélique	Bernard Borderie	with Robert Hossein and Jean-Claude Pascal
1968	Emma Hamilton	Emma Lyon-Hamilton	Christian-Jaque	with Richard Johnson and John Mills
1969	Cemetery Without Crosses	Maria Caine	Robert Hossein	with Robert Hossein
1969	A Golden Widow	Delphine Berger	Michel Audiard	with Claude Rich and Roger Carel
1970	You Can't Win 'Em All	Aila	Peter Collinson	with Tony Curtis and Charles Bronson
1971	Macédoine	Catherine	Jacques Scandelari	with Bernard Fresson and Robert Webber
1971	Roma Bene	Wilma Rappi	Carlo Lizzani	with Senta Berger, Virna Lisi, Nino Manfredi and Irene Papas
1971	Web of the Spider	Elisabeth Blackwood	Anthony Dawson	with Anthony Franciosa and Klaus Kinski
1972	The Call of the Wild	Calliope Laurent	Ken Annakin	with Charlton Heston
1979	Goetz von Berlichingen of the Iron Hand	Adelheid von Walldorf	Wolfgang Liebeneiner	based on a work by Johann Wolfgang von Goethe, with Raimund Harmstorf

== Quotes ==
"When people talk with me they always refer to Angélique, but I have also played fifty other women. I have tried for a long time to forget about her. But now I see her as a little sister who is always by my side and I have learned to live with her."
