= Symphony for a Massacre =

1963 French-Italian crime thriller film

- French poster
- Symphonie pour un massacre
- Directed by: Jacques Deray
- Written by: Alain Reynaud-Fourton; José Giovanni; Claude Sautet; Jacques Deray
- Based on: Les Mystifies by Alain Reynaud-Fourton
- Produced by: Julien Derode
- Starring: Michel Auclair; Claude Dauphin; José Giovanni; Michèle Mercier; Daniela Rocca; Jean Rochefort; Charles Vanel
- Cinematography: Claude Renoir
- Edited by: Paul Cayatte
- Music by: Michel Magne
- Color process: Black and white
- Production companies: Compagnie Industrielle et Commerciale Cinématographique; PECF; Dear Film Produzione; Ultra Film
- Distributed by: Radiance Films (UK, 2024)
- Release date: 2 August 1963 (France)
- Running time: 110 minutes
- Countries: France; Italy
- Language: French

Symphony for a Massacre (French: Symphonie pour un massacre), also known as The Corrupt and The Mystifier in English, is a 1963 crime thriller film directed by Jacques Deray and starring Michel Auclair, Claude Dauphin, José Giovanni, Michèle Mercier, Daniela Rocca, Jean Rochefort, Charles Vanel. A French and Italian co-production, it is based on the novel Les Mystifies by Alain Reynaud-Fourton, which was also adapted without credit in India as Johnny Gaddaar. In the film, a criminal plots to betray his partners in a narcotics deal.

== Plot ==
Five crooks pool their money to buy a load of drugs just smuggled into the country. But one of them secretly plots a betrayal and the bodies begin to pile up as his scheme unravels.

== Cast ==
- Michel Auclair as Clavet
- Claude Dauphin as Valoti
- José Giovanni as Moreau
- Michèle Mercier as Madeleine Clavet
- Daniela Rocca as Hélène Valoti
- Jean Rochefort as Jabeke
- Charles Vanel as Paoli
