= Angélique, Marquise des Anges =

1964 film

- French film poster
- Directed by: Bernard Borderie
- Written by: Claude Brulé; Bernard Borderie; Francis Cosne
- Dialogue by: Daniel Boulanger
- Based on: Angélique, the Marquise of the Angels by Anne and Serge Golon
- Produced by: Francis Cosne
- Starring: Michèle Mercier; Robert Hossein; Jean Rochefort; Claude Giraud; Giuliano Gemma; Philippe Lemaire; Jean Topart; Jacques Castelot
- Cinematography: Henri Persin
- Edited by: Christian Gaudin
- Music by: Michel Magne
- Production companies: Francos Films; Compagnie Industrielle et Commerciale Cinématographique Films Borderie; Gloria Film; Fono Roma
- Distributed by: S.N. Prodis (France); Gloria Film (West Germany); Euro International Films (Italy)
- Release date: 8 December 1964
- Running time: 115 minutes
- Countries: France; West Germany; Italy
- Language: French
- Box office: $22 million (est.)

Angélique, Marquise des Anges is a 1964 historical romance film directed by Bernard Borderie and starring Michèle Mercier, Robert Hossein and Jean Rochefort. It is based on the 1956 novel of the same name by Anne and Serge Golon. It was made as a co-production between France, Italy and West Germany.

It was shot at the Cinecittà Studios in Rome and the Billancourt Studios in Paris and on location at the Château de Tanlay and Fontenay Abbey. The film's sets were designed by the art director René Moulaert.

The film was a major hit across Continental Europe, and in 1967 was distributed in Britain. It was followed by four sequels starting with Marvelous Angelique.

== Synopsis ==
In mid-17th century France, young Louis XIV is struggling for his throne, beggars and thieves haunt Paris and brigands roam the countryside. Fifth child of an impoverished country nobleman, Angélique de Sancé de Monteloup grows up in the Poitou marshlands. Her logical destiny would be to marry a poor country nobleman, have children and spend her life fighting for a meagre subsistence. Destiny has other plans in store for her. At 17, on returning from her education in a convent, she finds herself betrothed to the rich count Jeoffrey de Peyrac (Jeoffrey Comte de Peyrac de Morens, Lord of Toulouse), 12 years her senior, lame, scarred and reputed to be a wizard. For the sake of her family, Angélique reluctantly agrees to the match but refuses the advances of her husband. Peyrac respects her decision and does not pursue his claim to conjugal rights, wishing rather to seduce than use force.

With the passing of months, Angélique discovers the talents and virtues of her remarkable husband: scientist, musician, philosopher; and to her surprise falls passionately in love with him. But Jeoffrey's unusual way of life is threatened by the ambitions of the Archbishop of Toulouse, and soon arouses the jealousy of the young king himself, Louis XIV. Jeoffrey is arrested and charged with sorcery. Angélique will single-handedly take on the might of the royal court and, survive murder and poison attempts on herself in a supreme effort to save Jeoffrey from the stake, to no avail. Instinctively, her whole being intent on revenge and her determination to survive, Angélique, alone and desperate, plunges into the darkness of the Paris underworld.

== Cast ==
- Michèle Mercier as Angélique Sancé de Monteloup
- Robert Hossein as Jeoffrey de Peyrac
- Jean Rochefort as François Desgrez, solicitor
- Claude Giraud as Philippe de Plessis-Bellières
- Giuliano Gemma as Nicolas Merlot, the childhood friend of Angélique aka Calembredaine
- Jacques Toja as King Louis XIV
- Jacques Castelot as Archbishop of Toulouse
- Charles Regnier as Conan Bécher
- Bernard Woringer as Bernard d'Andijos
- Robert Porte as Monsieur brother of the king
- Madeleine Lebeau as la Grande Demoiselle
- Philippe Lemaire as De Vardes
- François Maistre as Prince de Condé
- Geneviève Fontanel as Carmencita, a former mistress of Jeoffrey
- Jean Topart as Mr Bourié, the prosecutor
- Etchika Choureau as Hortense de Sancé, a sister of Angélique
- Jacques Mignot as Frère Raymond de Monteloup, a brother of Angélique
- Yves Barsacq as Le procureur Fallot
- Bernard Lajarrige as Baron Sancé de Monteloup, Angélique's father
- Jean Ozenne as Marquis de Plessis-Bellières
- Alexandre Rignault as Guillaume Lützen
- Renate Ewert as Margot
- Pierre Hatet as Chevalier de Germontaz
- Robert Hoffmann as Chevalier de Lorraine
- Roberto as Barcarole
- Denise Provence as Barbe
- Jacques Hilling as Mr Molines, notary
- André Rouyer as Clément Tonnelle
- Black Salem as Kouassiba, loyal servant of Jeoffrey
- Claude Vernier as President of the tribunal
- Rosalba Neri as La Polak
- Henri Cogan as Cul-de-Bois
- Serge Marquand as Jactance
- Monique Mélinand as Marquise de Plessis-Bellières
- Sylvie Coste as friend of Carmencita
- Albert Dagnant as The Swiss fugitive
- Michaël Munzer as Beau Garçon
- Paula Dehelly as Angélique's governess
- Le chien Karlo as Sorbonne, Desgrez's dog.
- Claire Athana as Marie-Thérèse of Spain, Queen of France
- Georges Guéret as Fritz Auer, alchemist
- Elisabeth Ercy as Rosine
- Patrick Lemaître as Flipot
- Guido Alberti as Le grand Mathieu
- Jean-Pierre Castaldi as A courtier

Voice dubbing

- Jacques Thébault as French voice of Giuliano Gemma
- Rosy Varte as French voice of Rosalba Neri
- Michèle Montel as French voice of Renate Ewert

== Production ==
Michèle Mercier recalled she had a clause added to her contract not to appear frontally naked on camera. "For the bath scene of the wedding night, I had put plaster on the point of my breasts and a plastic triangle at the bottom. Once in the water, panic, everything came off! I redid the scene. Me, a pharmacist's daughter, I know all about plasters!"-Mercier said.

== Box office ==
In France, the film sold 2,958,684 tickets, making it one of the top ten highest-grossing films of 1964 in the country. This was equivalent to an estimated $1.83 million in gross revenue. (Note: See Box office § Average ticket price.) It was also the second top-grossing film of the year in West Germany, where it sold 6,471,800 tickets and grossed €7,577,500 ($7.94 million). It was also the year's fifth top-grossing film in Italy with 5.442 million ticket sales. In Spain, the film sold 211,941 tickets upon release in 1964.

In the Soviet Union, the film sold 44.1 million tickets upon release in 1969, equivalent to estimated $12.3 million in gross revenue. It was the year's second highest-grossing foreign film in the Soviet Union (after the Indian Bollywood film Mamta), and the 31st highest-grossing foreign film ever in the country. In Poland, it did very well, selling millions of tickets, making it one of thirteen high-grossing foreign films in the country in 1968.

In total, the film sold more than 60,184,425 tickets worldwide, grossing an estimated $22.1 million in France, Germany and the Soviet Union.

== Angélique films ==
- 1964: Angélique, Marquise des Anges, director Bernard Borderie, starring Michèle Mercier, Robert Hossein, Jean Rochefort
- 1965: Marvelous Angelique, director Bernard Borderie, starring Michèle Mercier, Claude Giraud, Jean Rochefort
- 1966: Angelique and the King, director Bernard Borderie, starring Michèle Mercier, Jean Rochefort
- 1967: Untamable Angelique, director Bernard Borderie, starring Michèle Mercier, Robert Hossein
- 1968: Angelique and the Sultan, director Bernard Borderie, starring Michèle Mercier, Robert Hossein

== Bibliography ==
- Bergfelder, Tim. International Adventures: German Popular Cinema and European Co-Productions in the 1960s. Berghahn Books, 2005.
