= Amok (1983 film) =

1983 Moroccan drama

- Film poster
- Directed by: Souheil Ben-Barka
- Written by: Michel Constantin; François Rabaté; Souheil Ben-Barka
- Starring: Robert Liensol
- Cinematography: Girolamo La Rosa
- Music by: Miriam Makeba
- Release date: 13 July 1983
- Running time: 103 minutes
- Countries: Morocco; Guinea; Senegal
- Language: French

Amok is a 1983 Moroccan drama film directed by Souheil Ben-Barka. It won the Golden Prize at the 13th Moscow International Film Festival. Borrowing heavily of Alan Paton's Cry, the beloved country but putting the action in the context of the Soweto uprising, it tells the initiating journey of an old teacher from a backward Natal village to the conflict-ridden modern Johannesburg.

== Cast ==
- Robert Liensol as Mathieu Sempala
- Miriam Makeba as Joséphine Sempala
- Douta Seck as Reverend Sikau Norje
- Richard Harrison as Elton Horn
- Gianni Garko
- George Ardisson
- Edmund Purdom as Jaarsveld
- Claudio Gora as M. Horn
