= Philippe Lemaire =

French actor (1927–2004)

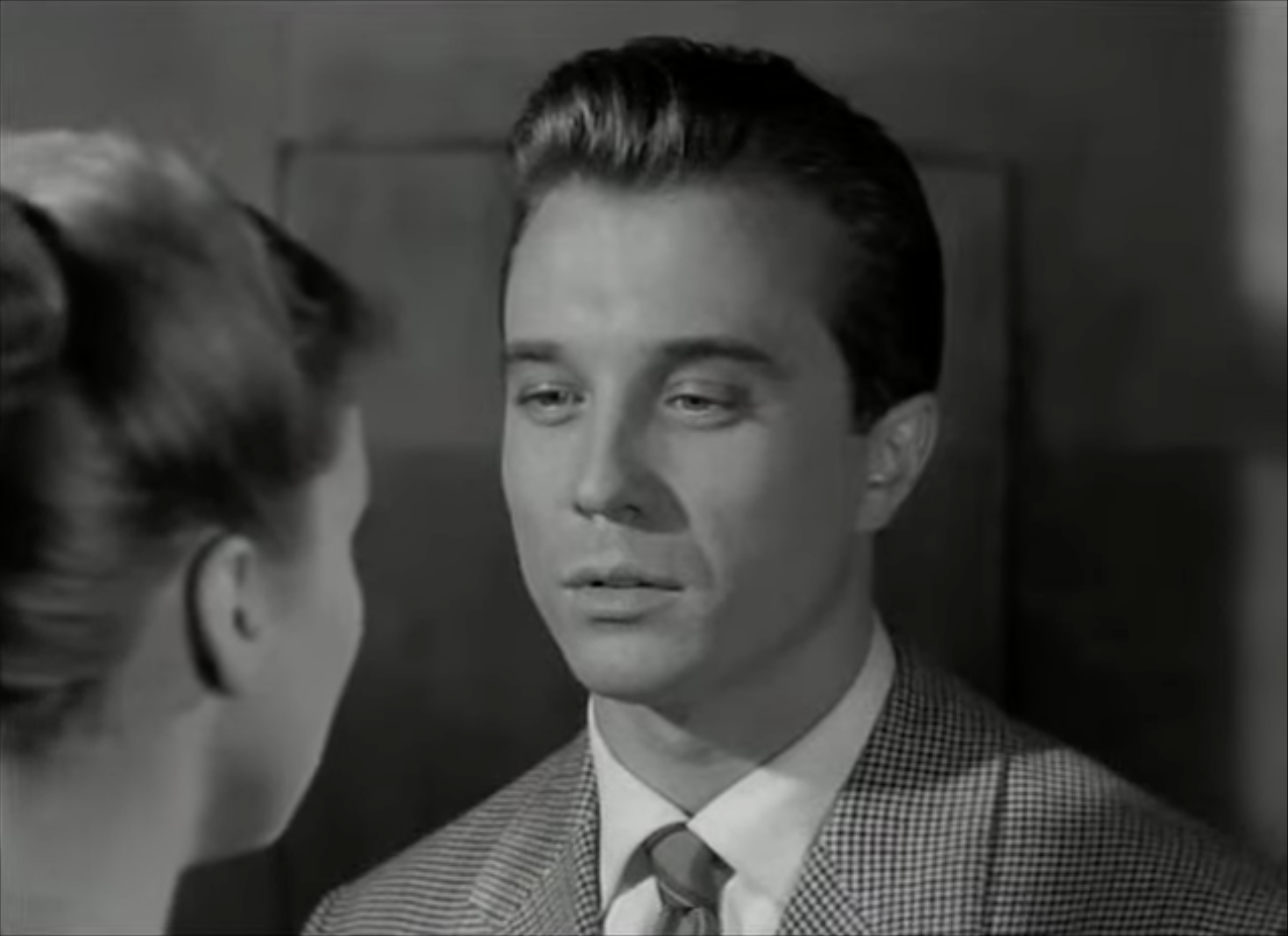
Lemaire in Saluti e baci (1953)

Philippe Lemaire (14 March 1927 – 15 March 2004) was a French actor. He appeared in more than 90 films from 1946 to 2004.

Lemaire was married three times; Nicole Pinton (1949–1951) (divorced); Juliette Gréco from 1953 to 1956, had one daughter, Laurence-Marie Lemaire (1954–2016); and to Claude Bouton (1959–1980) (divorced). He took his own life the day after his 77th birthday throwing himself in front of a Paris metro train.

== Filmography ==
Film
Year	Title	Role	Notes
1946	Roger la Honte		
1946	The Captain		
1946	Star Without Light		Uncredited
1946	The Queen's Necklace		Uncredited
1948	Eternal Conflict	Chardeuil fils	
1948	Monelle	Claude, l'amoureux	
1948	To the Eyes of Memory	Un pilote	Uncredited
1948	Scandal	Pierre Porteval	
1949	The Lovers Of Verona	Benedetti	
1949	Bonheur en location	Pierre	
1950	We Will All Go to Paris	Jacques Lambert, le crooner	
1950	Night Taxi	Alberto Franchi	
1950	The Bread Peddler	Lucien Labroue	
1950	Mon ami le cambrioleur	Patrick Lambert	
1950	The Naked Heart	François Paradis	
1950	They Are Twenty	Gabriel Lamy	
1951	The Forbidden Christ	Pinin	
1951	The Real Culprit	Mario	
1951	Mammy	Maurice Laprade	
1951	Nous irons à Monte Carlo	Philippe, le chanteur de charme	
1952	L'Amour toujours l'amour	Claude	
1953	Cent francs par seconde	Philippe	
1953	Minuit... Quai de Bercy	Luc Genevoix	
1953	When You Read This Letter	Max Trivet	
1953	Saluti e baci	Carlo Mastelli	
1953	Monte Carlo Baby	Philippe Versaint	
1954	Tempest in the Flesh	André	
1954	It's the Paris Life	Paul de Barfleur / Alain de Villebois	
1954	Women Without Hope	Pierre Larrieu	
1954	Fire Under Her Skin	Pierre Vaudouin	
1954	Vice Dolls	Pierre Beutin	
1954	Dangerous Turning	Freddy	
1955	Frou-Frou	Michel Artus	
1955	M'sieur la Caille	Jésus la Caille	
1955	Tom Toms of Mayumba		
1955	Les mauvaises rencontres	Alain Bergère	
1957	La ironía del dinero	Antonio Granier	(segment "Francia")
1957	The Strange Mr. Steve	Georges Villard	
1957	C'est une fille de Paname	Jacques Kellermann	
1957	Le désir mène les hommes	Norbert	
1958	Mon coquin de père	Philippe Servin	
1958	Cita imposible	Raimundo Castillo	
1960	Quai du Point-du-Jour	André aka 'Dédé'	
1961	In The Water... Which Makes Bubbles!...	Heinrich	
1962	Cartouche	Gaston de Ferrussac	
1962	The Girls of La Rochelle	Capitaine Timoléon	
1962	Le chevalier de Pardaillan	Le duc Charles d'Angoulème	
1962	Le Masque de fer	De Vaudreuil	
1963	Vice and Virtue	SS Group Leader Hans Streicher	
1963	Germinal	Henri Negrel	
1963	Your Turn, Darling	Enrico Pranzetti	
1964	Mission to Hell	Richard	
1964	Hardi Pardaillan!	Le duc Charles d'Angoulême	
1964	Mystery of the Red Jungle	Laurent	
1964	Marvelous Angelique	Jim Donavan	
1964	Angélique, Marquise des Anges	De Vardes	
1965	Assassination in Rome		
1965	La dame de pique	Duc d'Orléans	
1966	Angelique and the King	de Vardes	
1966	Kommissar X – Drei gelbe Katzen	Philip Dawson	
1966	Brigade antigangs	Randier	
1967	Sept hommes et une garce	Colonel Laforet	
1968	The Night of the Three Lovers	Max Sorelli	
1968	Spirits of the Dead	Philippe	(segment "Metzengerstein")
1970	The Blood Rose	Frédéric	
1973	Al otro lado del espejo	Pipo / Tina's husband	
1976	Le diable au coeur	Monsieur Bouvier, le père	
1976-1977	Les beaux messieurs de Bois-Doré	Adamas	5 episodes
1978	L'amant de poche	L'homme aux huîtres	
1978	The Guardian Angel	José Luis	
1983	Art of Love	General Laurentius	
1984	Claretta	Severio Petacci	
1984	Year of the Jellyfish	Lamotte	
1985	Liberté, Égalité, Choucroute	Le conteur Arabe	
1989	Oppressions	Le comte	
1994	Ciudad Baja (Downtown Heat)	Badal	
2003	Gomez & Tavarès	Silvio Baginorelli	
2004	Mariage mixte	Charles Dupreux	
2004	Arsène Lupin	Le cardinal d'Etigues	
2009	Ana Begins	French Narrator in Cinema	
