= La guerre du pétrole n'aura pas lieu =

1975 film

- Film poster
- Directed by: Souheil Ben-Barka
- Written by: Michel Constantin; Souheil Ben-Barka
- Screenplay by: Michel Constantin
- Produced by: Latif Lahlou
- Starring: Claude Giraud
- Cinematography: Girolamo La Rosa
- Music by: Gheorghe Zamfir
- Production companies: Cinétéléma; Euro Maghreb Films
- Distributed by: Les Films Molière
- Release date: July 1975
- Running time: 85 minutes
- Country: Morocco
- Language: French

La guerre du pétrole n'aura pas lieu is a 1975 Moroccan drama film directed by Souheil Ben-Barka. It was entered into the 9th Moscow International Film Festival.

== Plot ==
The film takes place in a fictive Arab country that could be Morocco. In the midst of social turmoil happening in oil refinery plants, an American company uses corruption to get into the local oil business, leading to a peak in revolts. A minister who was trying to denounce the ongoing corruption and the subsequent impoverishment of the country fails to control the revolts and ends up in jail.

== Description ==
La guerre du pétrole n'aura pas lieu is the second movie of Souheil Ben-Barka. It was really in French theaters on 27 August 1975. Following pressuring threats from Saudi Arabia and Iran, the film was banned.

== Cast ==
- Claude Giraud as Toumer
- Philippe Léotard as Padovani
- Sacha Pitoëff as Essaan
- Assan Ganouni as Hendas
- George Ardisson as Trudot (as Giorgio Ardisson)
- Claudio Gora as Stockell
- David Markham as Thomson
- Henryk Wodzinski as Kreis
