= Tower of Lust =

1955 film

- Directed by: Abel Gance
- Starring: Pierre Brasseur; Silvana Pampanini
- Release date: 18 March 1955
- Running time: 2h
- Countries: France; Italy
- Language: French

Tower of Lust (French: La Tour de Nesle) is a 1955 French / Italian drama film directed by Abel Gance.

== Cast ==
- Pierre Brasseur - Jehan Buridan
- Silvana Pampanini - Marguerite de Bourgogne
- Paul Guers - Gaultier d'Aulnay
- Jacques Toja - Philippe d'Aulnay
- Marcel Raine - Orsini
- Constant Rémy - Landry
- Lia Di Leo - Princesse Blanche
- Cristina Grado - Princesse Jeanne
- Jacques Mafioli
- Rivers Cadet - Le tavernier
