= Angélique and the King =

1959 novel by Anne Golon and Serge Golon

- Author: Anne Golon & Serge Golon
- Original title: Angélique et le Roy
- Translator: Rita Barisse
- Language: French
- Series: Angélique
- Genre: Historical novel
- Publisher: Trévise & Colbert
- Publication date: 1959
- Publication place: France
- Media type: Print (hardback & paperback)
- Preceded by: Angélique, the Marquise of the Angels
- Followed by: Angélique and the Sultan

Angélique and the King (French: Angélique et le Roy) is a 1959 novel by Anne Golon and Serge Golon, the second novel in the Angélique series. It was inspired by the life of Suzanne de Rougé du Plessis-Bellière, known as the Marquise du Plessis-Bellière. The novel is set during the Franco-Dutch War (1672-1678).

Angélique's marriage to Jeoffrey de Peyrac is thought to parallel that of the daughter of Madame de Sévigné, Françoise-Marguerite de Sévigné to the Comte de Grignan.

There are some similarities between the career of Angélique's second husband, Philippe de Plessis du Bellière, and that of the historical Comte d'Artagnan, well-known through his fictionalized depiction in Alexandre Dumas's The Three Musketeers and its sequels.

In 1966, the book was adapted into a film titled Angelique and the King.

== Plot summary ==
After many trials, Angelique finally takes her place in Louis XIV's court alongside her new husband, the Marshal of France, Philippe de Plessis du Bellière. She has many problems with her husband, who despises her for having blackmailed him into marriage. Eventually, she starts loving him (and vice versa) but he is killed in the king's war at the Low Countries. She earns the undivided attention of the king, and there are rumours that she may be his mistress. Her rival becomes Atenais de Montespan, the most recent favorite of the king, who plots against her. Angelique triumphs over her rival, and learns that her first husband, thought to be executed by the king himself, may still be alive. She resolves to find him at any cost.
