= France-Amérique =

French-American magazine

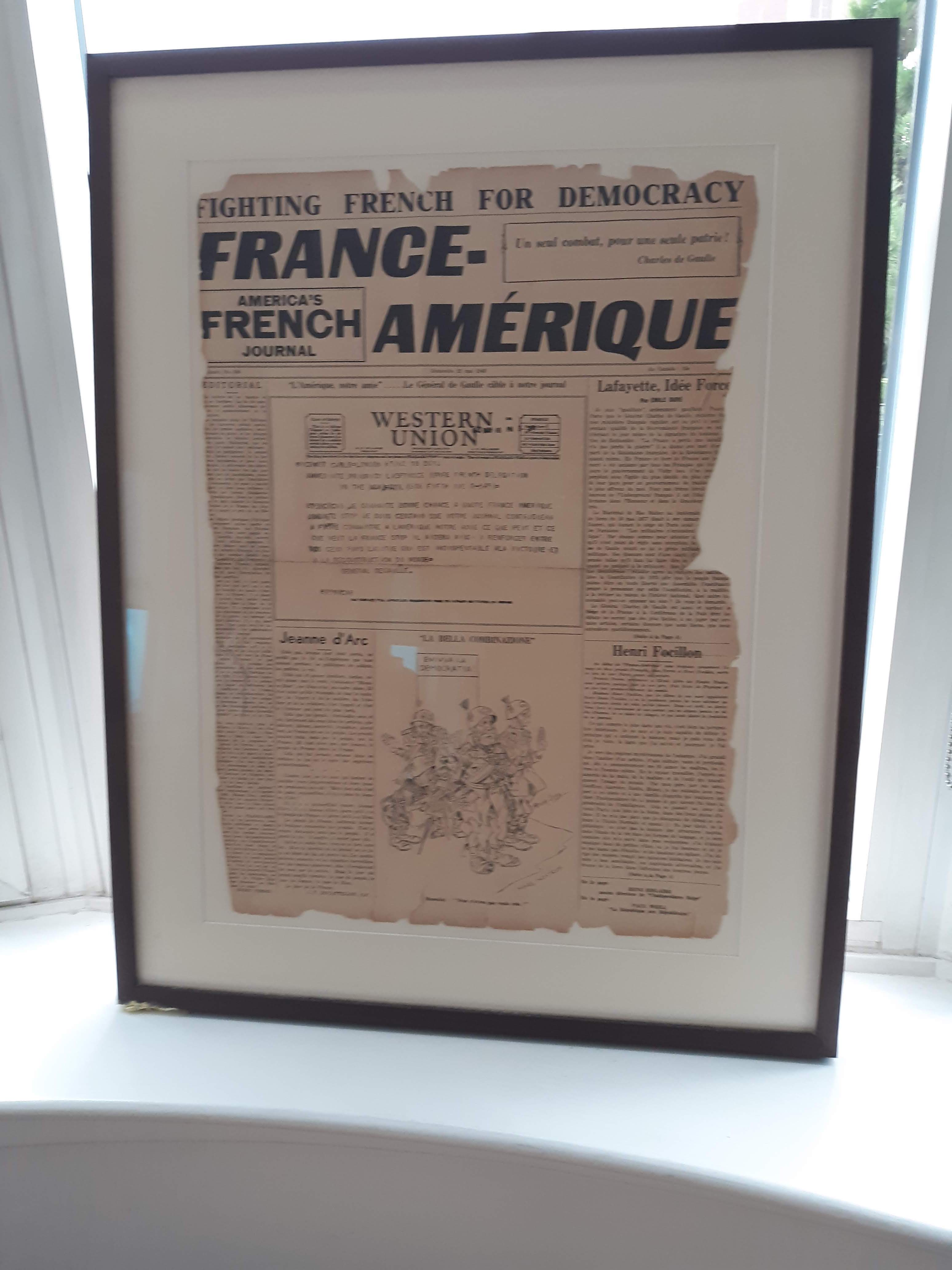
- France-Amerique first newspaper, May 23, 1943. Charles de Gaulle wishes good luck to France-Amérique. This telegram is shown on the first page.
- Categories: Lifestyle
- Frequency: Monthly
- Founded: 1943
- Final issue Number: March 2024
- Country: United States
- Language: English, French
- Website: france-amerique.com

France-Amérique is a bilingual, monthly print magazine focused on French-American culture and lifestyle, published in the United States and in France.

== History ==
France-Amérique was created in 1943 by French exiles in New York City to raise awareness about Occupied France in the United States, and to support the Resistance movement led by Charles de Gaulle. In the 1960s, it became the property of the French daily, Le Figaro, as a weekly international edition, and became the newspaper of reference for the French community in the United States.

In 2007, France-Amérique adopted a bi-monthly format when it merged with the monthly newspaper Journal Français, which was then the largest French-language publication in the United States. France-Amérique became monthly and adopted a magazine format in May 2008. The magazine was purchased by French-American author and publisher Guy Sorman in June 2013 and adopted the monthly magazine style it has today. In May 2015, France-Amérique eventually merged with France Magazine, a monthly English-language publication launched in 1985 by the French Embassy in Washington to promote French culture and l'art de vivre among Americans who loved France, but did not necessarily speak its language. France-Amérique has been published in French and in English ever since.

France-Amerique published its final traditional print issue in March 2024. The following notice was sent to subscribers that month:

Dear readers,

For 80 years, France-Amérique has contributed to promoting French culture in the United States, among both Francophiles and those who learned to appreciate France precisely by reading it.

This incredible journey, from the creation of France-Amérique in 1943 during World War II to the present day, has been made possible thanks to you.

But it is time now to reshape France-Amérique in order to build its future. This is why we must inform you that the publication in its current form is being put on hold.

France-Amérique will be reborn, with a different editorial format and frequency, to be announced in early 2025.

In the meantime, we would like to thank you warmly for your unwavering loyalty and support.

== See also ==
- List of French-language newspapers published in the United States
