= Sept hommes et une garce =

- Directed by: Bernard Borderie
- Written by: Bernard Borderie; Gerald Devriès; Mireille de Tissot
- Produced by: Dean Film, Franco London Films
- Starring: Jean Marais; Marilù Tolo; Florin Piersic
- Cinematography: Henri Persin
- Edited by: Boris Lewin
- Music by: Paul Misraki
- Distributed by: Pathé
- Release date: 1 March 1967
- Running time: 95 minutes
- Countries: France; Romania; Italy
- Languages: French; Romanian; Italian
- Box office: 667,086 admissions (France)

Sept hommes et une garce (English: Seven Guys and one slut) is a French adventure film from 1967. It was directed by Bernard Borderie, written by Bernard Borderie and Mireille de Tissot, starring Jean Marais and Marilù Tolo. The film was known under the title Seven Guys and a Gal (USA), La primula rosa (Italy), Sieben Männer und eine Frau (West Germany), 7 Homens e Uma Mulher (Portugal), "7 Mann und ein Luder" (Austria).

== Cast ==
- Jean Marais: Dorgeval
- Marilù Tolo: Carlotta
- Sylvie Bréal: Monica
- Florin Piersic: Franguignon
- Ettore Manni: Austrian capitain
- Joëlle Bernard: the female sutler
- Joëlle Bernard: Duprat
- Aimée Iacobescu
- Philippe Lemaire: Colonel Laforet
