= Jacques Toja =

French actor

- Born: 1 September 1929; Nice, France
- Died: 23 March 1996 (aged 66); Neuilly-sur-Seine, France
- Occupation: Actor

Jacques Toja (1 September 1929 – 23 March 1996) was a French actor.

== Filmography ==
Year	Title	Role	Notes
1955	Tower of Lust	Philippe d'Aulnay	
1958	Christine	Schaffer	
1961	Captain Fracasse	Léandre	
1961	The Three Musketeers	Aramis	
1964	Angélique, Marquise des Anges	Le Roi Louis XIV	
1965	Marvelous Angelique	Louis XIV	
1966	Angelique and the King	Louis XIV	
1967	Untamable Angelique	Narrator	
1991	A Day to Remember	Jean-François	
