= Bernard Borderie =

French film director and screenwriter (1924–1978)

Bernard Borderie (10 June 1924 in Paris – 28 May 1978 in Paris) was a French film director and screenwriter. His father, Raymond Borderie, was one of the producers of Les Enfants du Paradis (Children of Paradise, 1945).

== Selected filmography ==
- Wolves Hunt at Night (1952, based on the novel Le Lieutenant de Gibraltar by Pierre Frondaie)
- La môme vert-de-gris (1953, based on the Lemmy Caution novel Poison Ivy by Peter Cheyney)
- The Women Couldn't Care Less (1954, based on the Lemmy Caution novel Dames Don't Care by Peter Cheyney)
- Fortune carrée (1955, based on the novel Fortune carrée by Joseph Kessel)
- Tahiti ou la Joie de vivre (1957)
- Ces dames préfèrent le mambo (1958)
- The Mask of the Gorilla (1958, based on the novel Le Gorille vous salue bien by Antoine Dominique)
- Délit de fuite (1959, based on the novel Hit And Run by James Hadley Chase)
- Sergeant X (1960)
- Women Are Like That (1960, based on the Lemmy Caution novel I'll Say She Does by Peter Cheyney)
- Le Caïd (1960, based on the novel Le Grand Caïd by Claude Orval)
- The Three Musketeers (1961, based on the novel The Three Musketeers by Alexandre Dumas)
- Lemmy pour les dames (1962, based on the Lemmy Caution series by Peter Cheyney)
- Le Chevalier de Pardaillan (1962, based on the Pardaillan series by Michel Zevaco)
- Rocambole (1963, based on the Rocambole series by Pierre Alexis Ponson du Terrail)
- Your Turn, Darling (1963, based on the Lemmy Caution novel Your Deal, My Lovely by Peter Cheyney)
- Hardi Pardaillan! (1964, based on the Pardaillan series by Michel Zevaco)
- Angélique, Marquise des Anges (1964, based on the novel Angélique, the Marquise of the Angels by Anne Golon)
- Marvelous Angelique (1965, based on the Angélique series by Anne Golon)
- Angelique and the King (1966, based on the novel Angélique and the King by Anne Golon)
- Brigade antigangs (1966, based on a novel by Auguste Le Breton)
- Sept hommes et une garce (1967)
- Untamable Angelique (1967, based on the Angélique series by Anne Golon)
- Angelique and the Sultan (1968, based on the Angélique series by Anne Golon)
- Catherine, il suffit d'un amour (1969, based on the Catherine series by Juliette Benzoni)
- À la guerre comme à la guerre (1972, based on the novel Abenteuer eines jungen Herrn in Polen by Alexander Lernet-Holenia)
- The Gallant Lords of Bois-Doré (1976, TV miniseries based on the novel Les Beaux Messieurs de Bois-Doré by George Sand)
