= Souheil Ben-Barka =

Moroccan film director

- Born: 25 December 1942 (age 83); Timbuktu, French Sudan
- Occupations: Film director, screenwriter, film producer
- Years active: 1972-present
- Notable work: Amok

Souheil Ben-Barka (born 25 December 1942) is a Moroccan film director, screenwriter and film producer. He directed seven films between 1974 and 2002. His 1975 film La guerre du pétrole n'aura pas lieu was entered into the 9th Moscow International Film Festival. His 1983 film Amok won the Golden Prize at the 13th Moscow International Film Festival. In 1987 he was a member of the jury at the 15th Moscow International Film Festival.

== Biography ==
He was born in 1942 in Timbuktu, French Sudan. His father was a rich Moroccan merchant, and his mother was of Lebanese origin, her mother was of Armenian descent. He left Timbuktu at the age of 16. He spent a few years in Morocco before going to finish his higher education at Rome, Italy. One day in 1962, he happened to attend a film shooting on the street, the Italian filmmaker Federico Fellini was directing 8½. After this he decided to devote himself to the filmmaking. He studied sociology and got a bachelor's degree, then he studied at the Centro sperimentale di cinematografia in Rome.

== Filmography ==
Year	Title	Credited as			Notes
Year	Title	Director	Screenwriter	Producer	Notes
1972	A Thousand and One Hands	Yes	Yes	No	
1975	La guerre du pétrole n'aura pas lieu	Yes	Yes	No	
1977	Blood Wedding	Yes	Yes	No	
1981	Trances	No	No	Yes	Co-producer
1982	Amok	Yes	Yes	No	Co-writer with Michel Constantin and François Rabaté
1990	The Battle of the Three Kings	Yes	Yes	No	Co-director with Uchkun Nazarov
1996	L'Ombre du pharaon	Yes	Yes	No	Co-writer with Adriano Bolzoni
2002	Les amants de Mogador	Yes	Yes	Yes	Co-writer with Bernard Stora; Co-producer with Andrea De Liberato
2019	De sable et de feu	Yes	Yes	Yes	Co-writer with Monica Giansanti and Bernard Stora; Co-producer with Marco Gaudenzi
