= Angelique and the King =

- Italian film poster
- Directed by: Bernard Borderie
- Written by: Alain Decaux; Bernard Borderie; Francis Cosne
- Dialogue by: Pascal Jardin
- Based on: Angélique and the King by Anne and Serge Golon
- Produced by: Francis Cosne
- Starring: Michèle Mercier; Robert Hossein; Sami Frey; Jean Rochefort; Claude Giraud; Jacques Toja; Fred Williams; Estella Blain; Jean Parédès; Michel Galabru; Philippe Lemaire
- Cinematography: Henri Persin
- Edited by: Christian Gaudin
- Music by: Michel Magne
- Production companies: Francos Films; Compagnie Industrielle et Commerciale Cinématographique Films Borderie; Gloria Film; Fono Roma
- Distributed by: S.N. Prodis (France); Gloria Film (West Germany); Euro International Films (Italy)
- Release date: 4 February 1966
- Running time: 100 minutes
- Countries: France; West Germany; Italy
- Language: French
- Budget: 52.8 million tickets

Angelique and the King (French: Angélique et le Roy) is a 1966 historical adventure film directed by Bernard Borderie. It stars Michèle Mercier. It was made as a co-production between France, Italy and West Germany.

It was shot at the Billancourt Studios in Paris. Location shooting took place at Versailles, the Abbey of Fontenay, the Château de Chantilly and Senlis. The film's sets were designed by the art director Robert Giordani.

== Synopsis ==
In the third film of the Angelique series, the title character is sent on a mission by King Louis XIV of France. Later she learns that rumors are spreading that she is the King's mistress. In addition, she learns a secret that a satanic cult are practicing human sacrifices.

== Cast ==
- Michèle Mercier as Angélique de Plessis-Bellière
- Robert Hossein as Jeoffrey de Peyrac
- Jean Rochefort as Desgrez
- Claude Giraud as Philippe de Plessis-Bellières
- Jacques Toja as Louis XIV
- Sami Frey as Bachtiary Bey
- Estella Blain as De Montespan
- Fred Williams as Ràkóczi
- Pasquale Martino as Savary
- Jean Parédès as Saint-Amon
- René Lefèvre as Colbert
- Michel Galabru as Bontemps
- Philippe Lemaire as de Vardes
- Ann Smyrner as Thérèse
- Carol Le Besqueas as La Desoeillet
- Michel Thomass as Monsieur de Bonchef
- Robert Favart as the surgeon
- Roberto as Barcarolle

== Box office ==
The film sold 9,477,873 tickets in France, Germany and Spain. It also sold 43.3 million tickets in the Soviet Union, for a worldwide total of 52,777,873 ticket sales.
