= Jean Rochefort =

French actor (1930–2017)

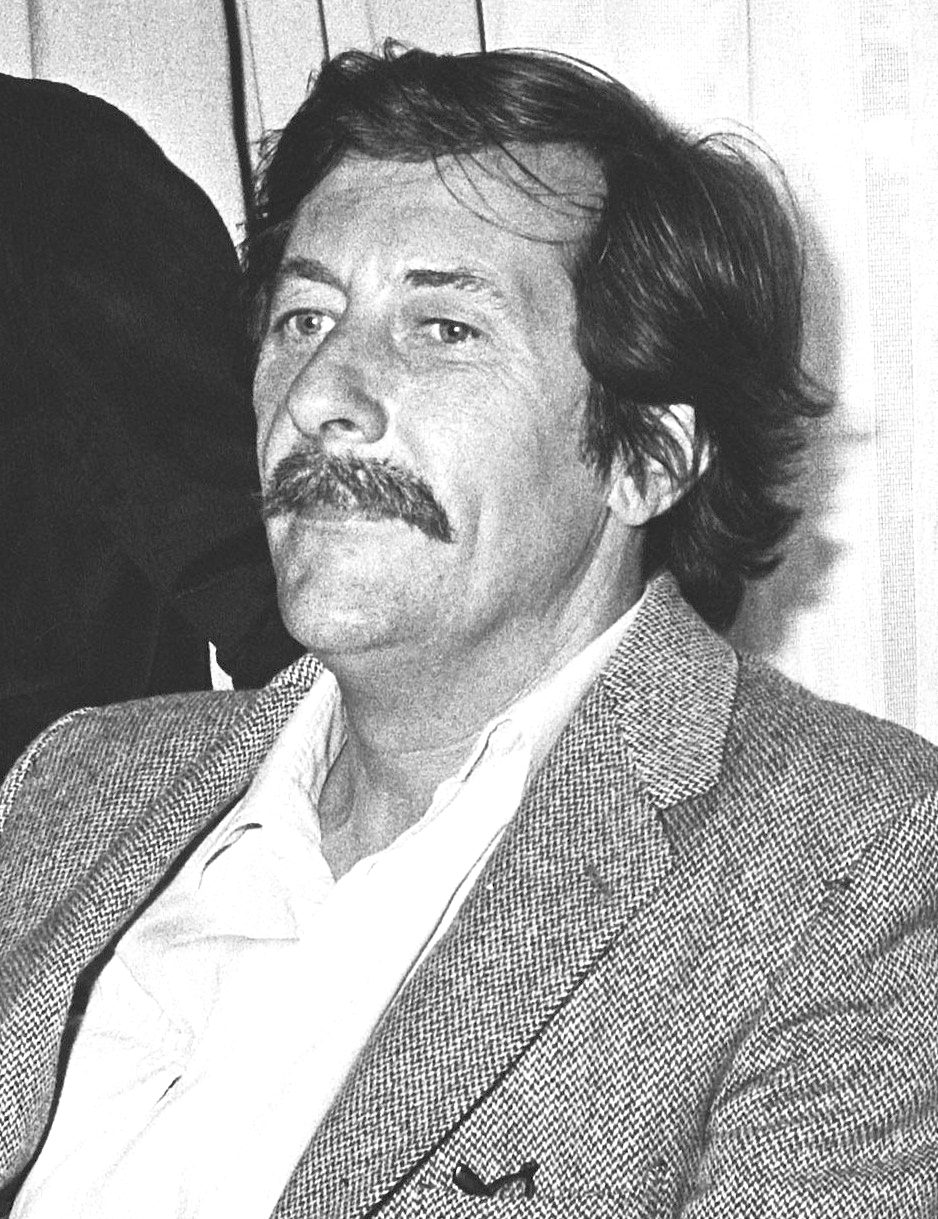
- Rochefort in 1979
- Born: Jean Raoul Robert Rochefort; 29 April 1930; Paris, Third French Republic
- Died: 9 October 2017 (aged 87); Paris, France
- Resting place: Grosrouvre Cemetery, Grosrouvre, France
- Education: CNSAD
- Occupation: Actor
- Years active: 1953–2016
- Spouses: Elisabeth Bardin (m. 1952; div. 1960) Alexandra Moscwa (m. 1960; div. 1981) Françoise Vidal (m. 1989)
- Children: 6

Jean Raoul Robert Rochefort (French: [ʒã ʁɔʃfɔʁ]; 29 April 1930 – 9 October 2017) was a French actor. He received many accolades during his career, including an Honorary César in 1999.

== Life and career ==
Rochefort was born on 29 April 1930 in Paris, France, though his parents were living in Dinan. He was educated at the Lycée Pierre Corneille in Rouen.

Rochefort was nineteen years old when he entered the Centre d'Art Dramatique de la rue Blanche. Later he joined the Conservatoire National. After completing his national service in 1953, he worked with the Compagnie Grenier Hussenot as a theatre actor for seven years. There he was noted for his ability to play both drama and comedy. He then became a television and cinema actor, and also worked as director.

After some supporting roles in Cartouche, Captain Fracasse and in Marvelous Angelique, Rochefort played his first big role with Annie Girardot as his wife and Claude Jade as his daughter in Hearth Fires in 1972. In this drama, he starred as a man who leaves his family for ten years before returning. In this film he played at 41 years old a father of adult children (the young Claude Jade was already 23). To appear older, he grew a moustache, his trademark, which he later removed only once, in 1996 for Ridicule.

Four years after Hearth Fires he was the leading star of the midlife crisis comedy Pardon Mon Affaire as a man who risks his married life with Danièle Delorme for an affair with Anny Duperey. Thanks to the success of this film, Rochefort became very popular. In 1972, he starred opposite Pierre Richard as Chief of Counter-Espionage, Louis Toulouse, in the Yves Robert comedy Le Grand Blond avec une chaussure noire, a role he reprised in the 1974 sequel Le Retour du grand blond, also directed by Robert. In 1998, he starred as "Fernand de Morcerf" opposite Gerard Depardieu in the mini-series Le Comte de Monte Cristo.

In the eighties, he became the narrator of the French version of Welcome to Pooh Corner, replacing Laurie Main. This made him popular with children at the time and Disney hired him to record several audio versions of their classic movies. In the 1990s, he returned to comedy with Les Grands Ducs where he played alongside two other actors of his generation with a similar career, Philippe Noiret and Jean-Pierre Marielle.

He was set to play the lead role in The Man Who Killed Don Quixote, after being found as "the perfect Quixote" by director Terry Gilliam. Rochefort learned to speak English just for the part. Unfortunately, amongst other production problems, he began suffering from a herniated disc. Unable to film for months, production was cancelled. A documentary, Lost in La Mancha, was made about the failed production.

== Personal life ==
In 1960, he married Alexandra Moscwa, with whom he had two children: Marie (1962) and Julien (1965). With actress-filmmaker Nicole Garcia, he also had a son Pierre. Through his marriage with Françoise Vidal, he had two children, Louise (1990) and Clémence (1992).

In his thirties during the shooting of Cartouche, he discovered his passion for horses and equestrianism. He was a horse breeder since then and owned Le Haras de Villequoy. The horse breeding and the estate lent to his character in Tell No One, who reflected Rochefort in this regard. His passion led him to become a horse consultant for French television in 2004.

== Death ==
Rochefort died on 9 October 2017 at the age of 87.

== Awards ==
Rochefort won many awards throughout his career, most notably three César Awards: Best Supporting Actor in 1976 for Que La Fête Commence, Best Actor in 1978 for Le Crabe-Tambour and an honorary prize in 1999. He was nominated for many more awards.

== Filmography ==
Year	Title	Role	Notes
1956	Rencontre à Paris (Meeting in Paris)	Intern	Uncredited
1958	Une balle dans le canon (A Bullet in the Gun Barrel)	Léopold	
1961	Vingt mille lieues sur la terre (20,000 Leagues Across the Land), Titre original: Леон Гаррос ищет друга (1960)	Fernand	
1961	Le Capitaine Fracasse	Malartic	
1962	Cartouche (Swords of Blood)	La Taupe	
1962	Le Soleil dans l'oeil (Sun in Your Eyes)	Cameo appearance	
1962	Le Masque de fer (The Iron Mask)	Lastréaumont	
1963	Outpost in Indochina	Sergeant Hérange	
1963	Symphonie pour un massacre (Symphony for a Massacre)	Jabeke	
1963	The Bread Peddler	Ovide Soliveau	
1963	La Foire aux cancres (The Blockhead Fair)	Sigoules	
1964	Du grabuge chez les veuves (Trouble Among Widows)	Inspector Laforêt	
1964	Les Pieds nickelés	Croquignol	
1964	Angélique, Marquise des Anges	François Desgrez	
1964	Beautiful Families	Marquis Osvaldo	(segment "Amare è un po' morire")
1965	Merveilleuse Angélique (Marvelous Angelique)	François Desgrez	
1965	Les Tribulations d'un chinois en Chine (Up to His Ears)	Leon	
1966	Angélique et le roy (Angelique and the King)	François Desgrez	
1966	Who Are You, Polly Maggoo? (Who Are You, Polly Magoo?)	Grégoire Pecque	
1967	Le Dimanche de la vie	Capitain Bordeille	
1967	À cœur joie (Two Weeks in September)	Philippe	
1968	Ne jouez pas avec les Martiens (Don't Play with Martians)	René Mastier	
1968	Pour un amour lointain	Guillaume	
1969	The Devil by the Tail	Count Georges de Coustines	
1970	Le Temps de mourir (The Time to Die)	Hervé Breton	
1970	La Liberté en croupe	Moss	
1970	Céleste	Georges Cazenave	
1972	Les malheurs d'Alfred		Uncredited
1972	L'Œuf ("The Egg")	Victor Dugommier	
1972	Les Feux de la chandeleur (Hearth Fires)	Alexandre Boursault	
1972	Le Grand blond avec une chaussure noire (The Tall Blond Man with One Black Shoe)	Colonel Louis Toulouse	
1973	L'Héritier (The Inheritor)	André Berthier	
1973	Le Complot (The Conspiracy)	Dominique Clavet	
1973	Bel ordure (Lovely Swine)	Police Inspector	
1973	Dio, sei proprio un padreterno! (Mean Frank and Crazy Tony)	Louis Annunziata	
1973	Salut l'artiste (Hail The Artist)	Clément Chamfort	
1974	L'Horloger de Saint-Paul (The Clockmaker)	Inspector Guilboud	
1974	Comment réussir quand on est con et pleurnichard (How to Make Good When One Is a Jerk and a Crybaby)	Foisnard	
1974	Le fantôme de la liberté (The Phantom of Liberty)	Mr. Legendre	
1974	Mio Dio, come sono caduta in basso! (Till Marriage Do Us Part)	Baron Henri De Sarcey	
1974	Retour du grand blond (The Return of the Tall Blond Man with One Black Shoe)	Colonel Toulouse	
1975	Isabelle devant le désir (Isabelle and Lust)	Mr. Vaudois	
1975	Que la fête commence... (Let Joy Reign Supreme)	Dubois	
1975	Les innocents aux mains sales (Innocents with Dirty Hands)	Albert Légal	
1975	Un divorce heureux (A Happy Divorce)	Jean-Baptiste Morin	
1976	Les vécés étaient fermés de l'intérieur	Commissioner Pichard	
1976	Calmos (Cool, Calm and Collected)	Albert	
1976	Les Magiciens (Death Rite)	Edouard	
1976	Pardon Mon Affaire (An Elephant Can Be Extremely Deceptive)	Étienne Dorsay	
1977	Le Diable dans la boîte (The Devil in the Box)	Alain Brissot	
1977	Nous irons tous au paradis (We Will All Meet in Paradise)	Étienne Dorsay	
1977	Le Crabe-tambour (Drummer-Crab)	The Captain	
1978	Who Is Killing the Great Chefs of Europe?	Auguste Grandvilliers	English language
1979	Le Cavaleur (Practice Makes Perfect)	Édouard Choiseul	
1979	Grandison	Carl Grandison	
1979	Courage - Let's Run	Martin Belhomme	
1979	French Postcards	Mr. Tessier	
1980	Chère inconnue (Sent a Letter to My Love)	Gilles Martin	
1980	Odio le bionde (I Hate Blondes)	Donald Rose	
1981	Un étrange voyage	Pierre	
1981	Il faut tuer Birgitt Haas (Birgitt Haas Must Be Killed)	Charles-Philippe Bauman	
1982	L'Indiscrétion	Alain Tescique	
1982	Le Grand Frère (The Big Brother)	Charles-Henri Rossi	
1983	Un dimanche de flic ("A Cops' Sunday")	Rupert	
1983	L'Ami de Vincent (A Friend of Vincent)	Vincent Lamarre	
1984	Frankenstein 90	Victor Frankenstein	
1984	Réveillon chez Bob	Louis Alban	
1985	David, Thomas et les autres ("A Volley for a Black Buffalo")	Mr. Louis	
1986	La Galette du roi	Arnold	
1987	Le Moustachu (The Field Agent)	Capitain Duroc	
1987	Tandem	Michel Mortez	
1987	My First Forty Years (also known as My Wonderful Life)	Prince Riccio	
1989	Je suis le seigneur du château (I'm the King of the Castle)	Jean Bréaud	
1990	Le Mari de la coiffeuse (The Hairdresser's Husband)	Antoine	
1990	Le Château de ma mère (My Mother's Castle)	Loïs de Montmajour / Adolphe Cassignole	
1991	Amoureux fou ("Love Crazy" or "Madly in Love")	Rudolph	
1992	Le Bal des casse-pieds	Henri Sauveur	
1992	El largo invierno	Jordi Casals	
1992	The Timekeeper	Louis XV	Short
1992	L'Atlantide	Le Meige	
1993	Tango	Bellhop	
1993	Cible émouvante (Wild Target)	Victor Meynard	
1993	La prossima volta il fuoco ("Next Time the Fire")	Amedeo	
1993	Tombés du ciel (Lost in Transit)	Arturo Conti	
1994	Tutti gli anni una volta l'anno (Once a Year, Every Year)	Raffaele	
1994	Prêt-à-Porter	Inspector Tantpis	
1995	Tom est tout seul	Jean-Pierre	
1995	Palace	Thomas Fausto	
1996	Les Grands Ducs	Eddie Carpentier	
1996	Ridicule	Marquis of Bellegarde	
1996	Never Ever	Gerard Panier	
1997	Barracuda	Mr. Clément	
1998	Le Serpent a mangé la grenouille	Mr. Moreau	
1998	Le Comte de Monte Cristo ("The Count of Monte Cristo")	Fernand de Morcerf	4 episodes
1998	El viento se llevó lo qué ("Gone with the wind")	Edgar Wexley	
1999	Rembrandt	Nicolaes Tulp	
2001	Le Placard	Kopel	
2001	Honolulu Baby	Cri Cri	
2001	La Vie sans secret de Walter Nions	Walter Nions	Short
2002	L'homme du train (The Man on the Train)	Manesquier	
2002	Blanche	Cardinal Mazarin	
2002	Lost in La Mancha	Himself	Uncredited
2003	Fanfan la tulipe	Narrator	Voice
2003	Il était une fois Jean-Sébastien Bach	Narrator	Voice
2003	Les Clefs de bagnole (The Car Keys)	Himself	cameo appearance
2004	RRRrrrr!!!	Lucie	
2004	Frankenstein	Old Blind Man	Miniseries
2004	Les Dalton (The Daltons)	Jolly Jumper	Voice
2005	Akoibon	Chris Barnes	
2005	L'enfer (Hell)	Louis	
2006	Ne le dis à personne (Tell No One)	Gilbert Neuville	
2006	Désaccord parfait	Louis Ruinard	
2007	Mr. Bean's Holiday	Head Waiter	
2007	I Always Wanted to Be a Gangster	Jean	
2007	La clef	Joseph Arp	
2008	id - Identity of the Soul	Narrator	
2008	Agathe Cléry	Louis Guignard	
2011	Titeuf	Pépé	Voice
2012	The Artist and the Model	Marc Cros	
2012	Astérix et Obélix: Au service de sa Majesté (Asterix and Obelix: God Save Britannia)	Lucius Fouinus	
2013	Jack and the Cuckoo-Clock Heart	Méliès	Voice
2013	Jappeloup	Himself	Uncredited
2015	April and the Twisted World	Pops	Voice
2015	Floride	Claude Lherminier	

== Theater ==
- 1953: Azouk by Alexandre Rivemale, staging Jean-Pierre Grenier, Théâtre Fontaine
- 1953: L'Huitre et la perle by William Saroyan, staging Jean-Pierre Grenier, Théâtre Fontaine
- 1953: Les Images d'Épinal by Albert Vidalie, staging Jean-Pierre Grenier, Cabaret La Fontaine des Quatre-Saisons
- 1954: Responsabilité limitée by Robert Hossein, staging Jean-Pierre Grenier, Théâtre Fontaine
- 1954: L’Amour des quatre colonels by Peter Ustinov, adaptation Marc-Gilbert Sauvajon, staging Jean-Pierre Grenier, Théâtre Fontaine
- 1957: Romanoff et Juliette by Peter Ustinov, staging Jean-Pierre Grenier, Théâtre Marigny
- 1957: L’Amour des quatre colonels by Peter Ustinov, staging Jean-Pierre Grenier, Théâtre de l'Ambigu-Comique
- 1958: Tessa by Jean Giraudoux from the work of Basil Dean and Margaret Kennedy, staging Jean-Pierre Grenier, Théâtre Marigny
- 1958: L’Étonnant Pennypacker by Liam O'Brien, staging Jean-Pierre Grenier, Théâtre Marigny
- 1960: Champignol malgré lui by Georges Feydeau and Maurice Desvallières, staging Jean-Pierre Grenier, Théâtre Marigny
- 1960: Le Comportement des époux Bredburry by François Billetdoux, staging by the author, Théâtre des Mathurins
- 1960: Génousie by René de Obaldia, staging Roger Mollien, TNP Théâtre Récamier
- 1961: Loin de Rueil by Maurice Jarre and Roger Pillaudin from the work of Raymond Queneau, staging Maurice Jarre and Jean Vilar, TNP Théâtre national de Chaillot
- 1962: Frank V by Friedrich Dürrenmatt, staging André Barsacq, Théâtre de l'Atelier
- 1964: Cet animal étrange by Gabriel Arout from the work of Anton Tchekhov, staging Claude Régy, Théâtre Hébertot
- 1965: La Collection and L’Amant by Harold Pinter, staging Claude Régy, Théâtre Hébertot
- 1966: La prochaine fois je vous le chanterai by James Saunders, staging Claude Régy, Théâtre Antoine
- 1969: Le Prix by Arthur Miller, staging Raymond Rouleau, Théâtre Montparnasse
- 1970: Un jour dans la mort de Joe Egg by Peter Nichols, staging Michel Fagadau, Théâtre de la Gaîté-Montparnasse
- 1971: C'était hier by Harold Pinter, staging Jorge Lavelli, Théâtre Montparnasse
- 1982: L'Étrangleur s'excite by Éric Naggar, staging Jean Rochefort, Théâtre Hébertot
- 1985: Boulevard du mélodrame by Juan Pineiro and Alfredo Arias, staging Alfredo Arias, National Dramatic Center of Aubervilliers
- 1988: Une vie de théâtre by David Mamet, adaptation Pierre Laville, staging Michel Piccoli, Théâtre des Mathurins
- 1988: La femme à contre-jour by Éric Naggar, staging Jean Rochefort, Théâtre des Mathurins
- 1988: Histoire du soldat (The Soldier's Tale) by Igor Stravinsky, staging Jean Rochefort, Théâtre de Paris
- 1988: Le Carnaval des animaux musique Camille Saint-Saëns
- 1989: Une vie de théâtre by David Mamet, staging Michel Piccoli
- 1991: Histoire du soldat (The Soldier's Tale) by Igor Stravinsky, staging Jean Rochefort
- 1995: Oraison funèbre sur la mort de Condé by Jacques Bénigne Bossuet, music Jean-Baptiste Lully, direction Hervé Niquet, Royal Chapel of the Château de Versailles
- 1996: Le Petit Tailleur music Tibor Tibor Harsányi and Le Carnaval des animaux music Camille Saint-Saëns, Théâtre du Châtelet, Bruxelles
- 1998: Art by Yasmina Reza, staging Patrice Kerbrat, with Pierre Vaneck and Jean-Louis Trintignant, Théâtre Hébertot
- 2004: Heureux ? sketches by Fernand Raynaud, with Bruno Fontaine, Comédie des Champs-Élysées
- 2006: Mousquetaires de Richelieu, show of the Puy du Fou
- 2007: Entre autres, a one-man show with Lionel Suarez playing accordion, in which he pays a tribute to the authors who influenced him, from Roland Barthes to Jean Yanne, notwithstanding Fernandel, Verlaine, Boby Lapointe or Primo Levi, Théâtre de la Madeleine
- 2007 at the Olympia: where he sang "Félicie aussi", a song by Fernandel, during the last three concerts of Vincent Delerm's tour 30 and 31 May 2007 and 1 June 2007

== Audio book ==
- Le Pont de la rivière Kwaï (The Bridge over the River Kwai) by Pierre Boulle
