= Angélique, the Marquise of the Angels =

1956 novel by Anne GolonandSerge Golon

- First edition
- Author: Anne Golon & Serge Golon
- Original title: Angélique, Marquise des Anges
- Translator: Rita Barisse
- Language: French
- Series: Angélique
- Genre: Historical novel
- Publisher: Trévise & Colbert
- Publication date: 1956
- Publication place: France
- Media type: Print (Hardback & Paperback)
- Followed by: Angélique and the King

Angélique, the Marquise of the Angels (French: Angélique, Marquise des Anges) is a 1956 novel by Anne Golon & Serge Golon, the first novel in Angélique series. The series was inspired by the life of Suzanne de Rougé du Plessis-Bellière, known as the Marquise du Plessis-Bellière.

Angélique's marriage to Jeoffrey de Peyrac is thought to be parallel to that of the daughter of Madame de Sévigné, Françoise-Marguerite de Sévigné, to the Comte de Grignan.

In 1964, it was adapted into a film by the same title.

== Plot summary ==
In Mid-17th century France, a young Louis XIV struggles for his throne, beggars and thieves haunt Paris and brigands roam the countryside.

The fifth child of an impoverished country nobleman, Angélique de Sancé de Monteloup grows up in the Poitou marshlands. Her logical destiny would be to marry a poor country nobleman, have children and spend her life fighting for a meager subsistence.

Destiny has other plans in store for her. At 17, on returning from her education in a convent, she finds herself betrothed to the rich count, Joffrey de Peyrac (Joffrey Comte de Peyrac de Morens d'Irristru, Lord of Toulouse and Aquitaine), 12 years her senior – lame, scarred and reputed to be a wizard.

For the sake of her family, Angélique reluctantly agrees to the match but refuses the advances of her husband. Peyrac respects her decision and does not pursue his claim to conjugal rights, wishing to seduce her rather than use force.

As the movie progresses, Angelique discovers the talents and virtues of her remarkable husband – scientist, musician, philosopher – and eventually falls passionately in love with him.

But Peyrac's unusual way of life is threatened by the ambitions of the Archbishop of Toulouse, and soon arouses the jealousy of King Louis XIV, who disliked nobles who were independent of the monarchy and tried to block them from developing power in their own regions by keeping them occupied at Versailles for most of the year. Louis, anxious about Joffrey's growing influence and fearful that he will start another Fronde and overthrow the monarchy, has Joffrey arrested and charged with sorcery. Angélique tries to single-handedly take on the might of the royal court. She survives several murder attempts and overcomes insurmountable odds in an effort to save Joffrey from being burned at the stake, but to no avail.

Alone and desperate, Angélique plunges into the darkness of the Paris underworld, intent on revenge and fueled by her determination to survive.

Angélique realizes that her underworld existence is unfair to her sons, who belong to one of the greatest noble families in France. She works to regain her family's rightful inheritance that had been stolen from them by the monarchy. She blackmails her cousin Philippe du Plessis de Bellière, a favourite Marshal of the king, into marriage.

== Characters ==
- Angélique de Sancé de Monteloup (Sagittarius, 1639) – Main protagonist, the second daughter and the fifth of ten children of the Baron Armand de Sancé de Monteloup, an impoverished lesser nobleman of a very old family line. Her mother, Adeline, who died while Angélique was still in the convent, is a woman of few words but an understanding mother. Angelique's mother spends most of her time in her garden tending to fruit trees and vegetables to supplement the family's limited income, and the children enjoy robust health despite family poverty, being allowed to grow up freely in the countryside.
- Jeoffrey de Peyrac de Morens d'Irristru (1627) – Angélique's enigmatic husband, the rich and powerful Count of Toulouse, Prince of Aquitaine, whom she reluctantly marries and later loves deeply. As a highly celebrated troubadour he is known as "The Golden Voice of the Kingdom." As a result of his profound intellect and skill with weaponry, he is often referred to as "The Great Lame Devil of Languedoc," while those who fear him refer to him as "The Sorcerer." Angélique has two sons with him, Florimond (~4 May 1659) and Cantor (~27 January 1661). Florimond has a strong physical resemblance to his father, while Cantor inherits his talents. Jeoffrey was the youngest child of an impoverished Languedoc aristocrat of very ancient lineage. As in the Ancien Régime ways, the infant Jeoffrey lived with his Protestant wet-nurse until the age of three, but then her village was sacked, and the inhabitants massacred, by Catholic zealots. Jeoffrey's face was disfigured by the swords of the Catholic invaders and he was tossed from a window, resulting in his physical disability. He was recognized by a Catholic searching the ruins for plunder, who carried Jeoffrey and his foster sister Margot through the mountains to return him to his mother, who nursed him back to health. Jeoffrey endures jeers and insults about his disfigurement and limp, causing him to retreat into his studies. At seventeen, already a profound scholar, Jeoffrey leaves his family and travels extensively to quench his thirst for knowledge. He returns to find his family gone and his inheritance divided among creditors. Jeoffrey recovers what inheritance remains and adds to it what he has earned on his travels, becoming very rich and influential in Toulouse.
- Louis XIV – Being the king of an already unstable realm, Louis is disturbed by Jeoffrey's widespread influence and the reported contempt he holds for those that abuse their power. Fearing Jeoffrey will incite the nobility of the Languedoc to challenge the power of the monarchy, he orders Jeoffrey's arrest for sorcery and oversees his execution.
- Maître François Desgrez – A poor but very shrewd lawyer, he is the only one willing to defend Jeoffrey in his trial. After Jeoffrey is condemned to death, Desgrez is forced to flee and later sold his law license and became a Lieutenant of Police in Paris. He remained Angélique's friend and often comes to her aid.
- Conan Bécher – An Inquisitor, alchemist and Franciscan friar. He was chosen by the Archbishop of Toulouse to observe Jeoffrey's gold processing technique. Instead of acknowledging it as a valid scientific technique, Bécher condemned everything shown to him as heresy. He uses his influence to push Jeoffrey's death sentence at the stake, forcing Angélique and others associated with Jeoffrey into hiding to avoid being executed or imprisoned.
- Baron Benoît de Fontenac, Archbishop of Toulouse – Also the Grand Inquisitor, a very avaricious man who secretly desires power like that of Cardinal Richelieu. He continually seeks to attack Jeoffrey and to obtain his secret of processing gold. Upon hearing of Jeoffrey's arrest, the people of Languedoc knew it was instigated by the Archbishop. Mass protests and riots against the Archbishop result, lasting until the King himself forcibly put a stop to it.
- Chevalier de Germontaz – A boorish and greedy nephew of the Archbishop of Toulouse, who made an insulting attempt on Angelique's virtue and was killed in a duel by the watchful Jeoffrey. His death served the Archbishop in further condemning Jeoffrey.
- Maître Molines – A Huguenot steward who manages the finances of the de Sancés' and the du Plessis' estates and Jeoffrey's Poitou business contact. It was Molines who originally proposes the marriage between Jeoffrey and Angélique, and he later assists with Angélique's marriage with Philippe. Molines loves Angélique like a daughter, and often it was he who would give her helpful advice.
- Barbe – A nursemaid in Hortense's service, she is entrusted with Angélique's sons, but when Hortense's family was forced to flee, she had to find work elsewhere. Angélique finally found her again while she was working at Maître Bourjus' The Brazen Cock. Then became permanent nurse to her sons after Angélique's return to affluence.
- Kouassi-Bâ – A Moor in Jeoffrey's service as bodyguard and indispensable assistant in his studies in the natural sciences. He was forced to flee after Jeoffrey's death but was captured and sent to the King's galleys.
- Fritz Hauër – A Saxon miner, Jeoffrey's other indispensable assistant in his study of the natural sciences and manages his mining operations. Like Kouassi-Bâ, the loyal miner risked his life chosen to help Jeoffrey at the trial.
- Marquis Bernard d'Andijos – A Toulousain playboy nobleman, just like Péguilin Antoine Nompar de Caumont, Duke of Lauzun, both are good friends of Jeoffrey. He acts as Angélique's proxy bridegroom on her wedding in Monteloup. After Jeoffrey's death he led a rebellion in Languedoc against the King for Jeoffrey's sake.
- Clément Tonnel – A spy and extortionist working under Nicolas Fouquet. He shadows Angélique, working as a major-domo in Jeoffrey's palace. Have several times attempted on Angélique's life and helped in bringing ludicrous heretical evidence against Jeoffrey.
- Carmencita, Duchess of Mérecourt – One of Jeoffrey's mistresses whose connection he had long severed when he married Angélique. The flighty and pleasure-loving Duchess became embittered against Jeoffrey when he refused to resume relationship with her and plays a part in condemning Jeoffrey in his trial for sorcery.
- Nicolas Merlot – A shepherd in the service of Angélique's father. Along with Valentin, a miller's son, they are Angélique's childhood friends. On the day of Angélique's wedding he escaped Poitou to eventually become Calembredaine, "the Illustrious Scamp", a bandit leader of the Parisian underworld. When Angélique was cast out from her society after Jeoffrey was condemned to be burned at the stake, it was under his protection that she survived among the Paris underworld.
- Philippe du Plessis Bellière (1637) – Angélique's handsome, vain, and arrogant cousin, whose family estate runs next to her father's and who she secretly admired in her teenage years. Because of his parents' ambitions for power, Philippe had a very neglected upbringing, lacking in love but expected to put on an impressive show, which resulted in him being a brutal misogynist. In order to secure for her sons their rightful inheritance, she blackmailed Philippe - the King's favourite, Grand Marshal, this "Handsomest man in the Court" - into marriage. Infuriated by being put into this position, he made her suffer greatly for it throughout their brief marriage, before finally admitting he had fallen in love with her just before he died.
- Josselin de Sancé, Angélique's eldest brother, prevented by his grandfather from joining the King's navy, ran away to America. He was disowned by his furious grandfather and sorely missed by his father - (and by Angelique, who was eventually to find him again on the other side of the Atlantic many years later).
- Raymond de Sancé – Angélique's second-eldest brother, who became a Jesuit priest instead of staying at home to inherit the family property in the absence of Josselin. The resourceful Raymond would often make himself available to aid his younger siblings whenever they were in difficulties.
- Hortense de Sancé – Angélique's eldest sister, she married a cousin of the minor de Sancé branch, Gaston Fallot, a respected procurator in Paris. A very uptight, conventional and somewhat mean-minded girl who only reveals her more natural sisterly emotions at the end of the first book.
- Gontran de Sancé – Angélique's third eldest and closest brother, he ran away to Paris to become a painter and became estranged from his family because artisans were classed as subservient labourers. However, after learning his trade he became a highly talented painter and produced decorative work in Louis XIV's new palace at Versailles which even attracted the admiration of the king. He showed preternatural ability in the depictions of his sitters in his paintings, specifically of Angélique's sons and of Guillaume Lützen.
- Guillaume Lützen – An old German mercenary in the Baron de Sancé's service. Mainly to protect the Monteloup castle and its inhabitants, especially the de Sancé women, from brigands, soldiers, and worse, tax collectors. He is very dear to Angélique.
- Fantine Lozier – Nurse to the de Sancé children. Often would tell her charges scary stories about Gilles de Rais or their family's ghost.
- Pulchérie and Jeanne/Marthe de Sancé – The Baron Armand de Sancé's unmarried sisters. Most likely due to lack of dowry.
- Madelon de Sancé – Angélique's younger sister, who died in a plague-ridden famine during the Fronde while she, Hortense, and Angélique were being educated in the convent.
- Denis de Sancé – Angélique's fourth brother, the only son to meet his father's expectation by going into the service of the King's army. He eventually took over the family property.
- Marie-Agnès de Sancé – Angélique's youngest sister, who became a Maid of Honour to the Queen of France and then retreated into a convent.
- Albert de Sancé – Angélique's fifth brother, he became a page in the household of Monsieur, the King's brother.
- Jean-Marie de Sancé – Angélique's sixth brother, he was on his way to becoming a priest.
- Brother Anselme and Brother Jean of the Nieul Abbey – After Josselin fled to America, Angélique, Nicolas and a band of urchins wanted to try their luck too. However they got lost in the Nieul forest and were sheltered by the kind-hearted Brother Anselme. Brother Jean rescued Angélique from being perverted by some of the novices. Meanwhile, for his act of kindness, when he personally escorted the children back to their families, Brother Anselme was rewarded with abuses hurled at him.
- Father Vincent – Angélique met him during her stay at the convent. He prevented her from being ravished and convinced her to leave her rebelliousness to pursue her studies more seriously. He also had an influence in transforming the young man, Henri de Roguier, who later becomes a Knight of the Order of Malta (and appears in the fourth book in the series, Indomptable Angélique.) This virtuous priest became Saint Vincent de Paul after his death.
- Father Antoine – A Lazarist priest, a devoted follower of Father Vincent. He served as confessor just before Jeoffrey's execution and relayed messages between Jeoffrey and Angélique.
- Maître Aubin – The King's public executioner. A good man for one with such a disturbing occupation and an equally disturbing wife. Uncle to Cordeau (Cord-around-the-neck) whose mother was landlady of Angélique's secret lodging during Jeoffrey's trial.
- Wood-Bottom Janir – Angélique's friend during her existence in the Parisian underworld. He succeeded as the Great Coësre, ruler of the Parisian underworld, after Angélique killed the former, Squat Rolin', in order to save Florimond from being sold into beggary.
- Barcarole – a dwarf who befriended Angélique and brought her to Calembredaine when she was an outcast and on the run from the King's police. He later became one of the jesters to the Queen of France and continued to help Angélique whenever she was in danger.
- Flipot – An orphan of Calembredaine's gang, became a pickpocket and Angélique's faithful lackey.
- The Polack – A camp-follower known as "The Marquise of the Polacks", was Calembredaine's mistress until Angélique supplanted her. She became Angélique's friend and taught her all sorts of self-defense tricks.
- Linot – Another orphan in Calembredaine's gang, Angélique saved him from being sold to Rotten-Jean, the sinister Trader of Children. Linot's vocation being a peddler by playing the hurdy-gurdy which his grandfather had left him, as well as selling waffles, pastries, etc. He was horribly killed during one of those dissipated sprees of the King's brother and his companions.
- Claude le Petit – "The Gutter Poet", a pamphleteer whom Angélique at first wanted to kill for writing slanders about her and her husband during Jeoffrey's imprisonment. He later became her lover and she acquired his help to disgrace those responsible for Linot's and Maître Bourjus' deaths, which resulted in him being hanged.
- David Chaillou – Son of a spice importer from Toulouse, apprentice cook and orphan nephew of Maître Jacques Bourjus, the keeper of The Brazen Cock tavern. It was after the tavern keeper's death that Angélique had the opportunity to help in realising David's father's dream of patenting chocolate and making it available to the masses which in turn helped Angélique to amass wealth and rise into upper society.
- Maître Audiger – Army cook, master chef specialised in confections and refreshments, then butler to the Count of Soissons, he was convinced of his own right to patent the selling of chocolate in France, but wanted to marry Angélique and provide her with the benefits. Angelique however soon lost interest in him personally and preferred to remain in control of her own life. When he learned that Angélique was going to marry her cousin, Philippe, he admitted defeat and rejoined the army.
- Javotte – An orphan girl who looked after and helped save Florimond and Cantor from abuse and starvation after they were abandoned with a country "nurse" by Hortense, with whom Angelique had to leave them when she hid in the Paris underworld and who could not afford to keep them when her husband's business was affected by Jeoffrey's downfall. She later became Angélique's personal maid.
