= France Magazine =

US periodical about France

- Editor-in-Chief: Karen Taylor
- Staff writers: Michel Faure
- Frequency: Quarterly
- Publisher: French-American Cultural Foundation
- Founded: 1985
- Country: United States
- Based in: Washington DC
- Language: English
- Website: www.completefrance.com/our-magazines/france-magazine
- ISSN: 0886-2478

France Magazine was founded in 1985. The magazine is published quarterly by the French-American Cultural Foundation and has its headquarters in Washington DC. Karen Taylor is the editor-in-chief.

France Magazine is written in English for an international audience and its articles range in subject matter from contemporary design to music festivals. It also includes information on French cultural events taking place in North America. Temps Modernes is a regular column featured in each issue of France Magazine. It is written by Michel Faure, a retired journalist from L'Express.

The cartoonist Dave Colton draws the regular puzzle cartoon feature, Faux Mots

== Awards ==
In 1996, Cadmus magazines awarded the spring edition of France Magazine with a Pewter Award (part of the Gold Ink Awards competition) for printing excellence.
