= Suzanne du Plessis-Bellière =

French nobelwoman of the 17th century

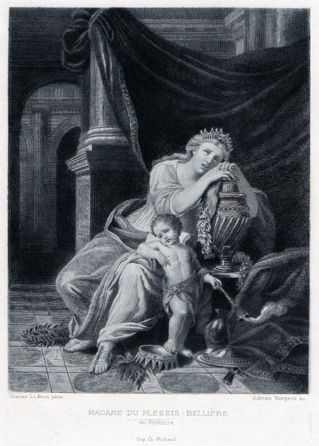

Suzanne de Bruc de Monplaisir also known as Suzanne du Plessis-Bellière (c. 1605–1705) was the wife of Jacques de Rougé marquis du Plessis-Bellière.

She was one of France's most famous women of her time. She had a court of artists and statesmen around her. Widowed in 1654, she was very close to Nicolas Fouquet. When he was arrested in 1661, she was kept under house arrest until 1665.
