= Anne Golon =

French author (1921–2017)

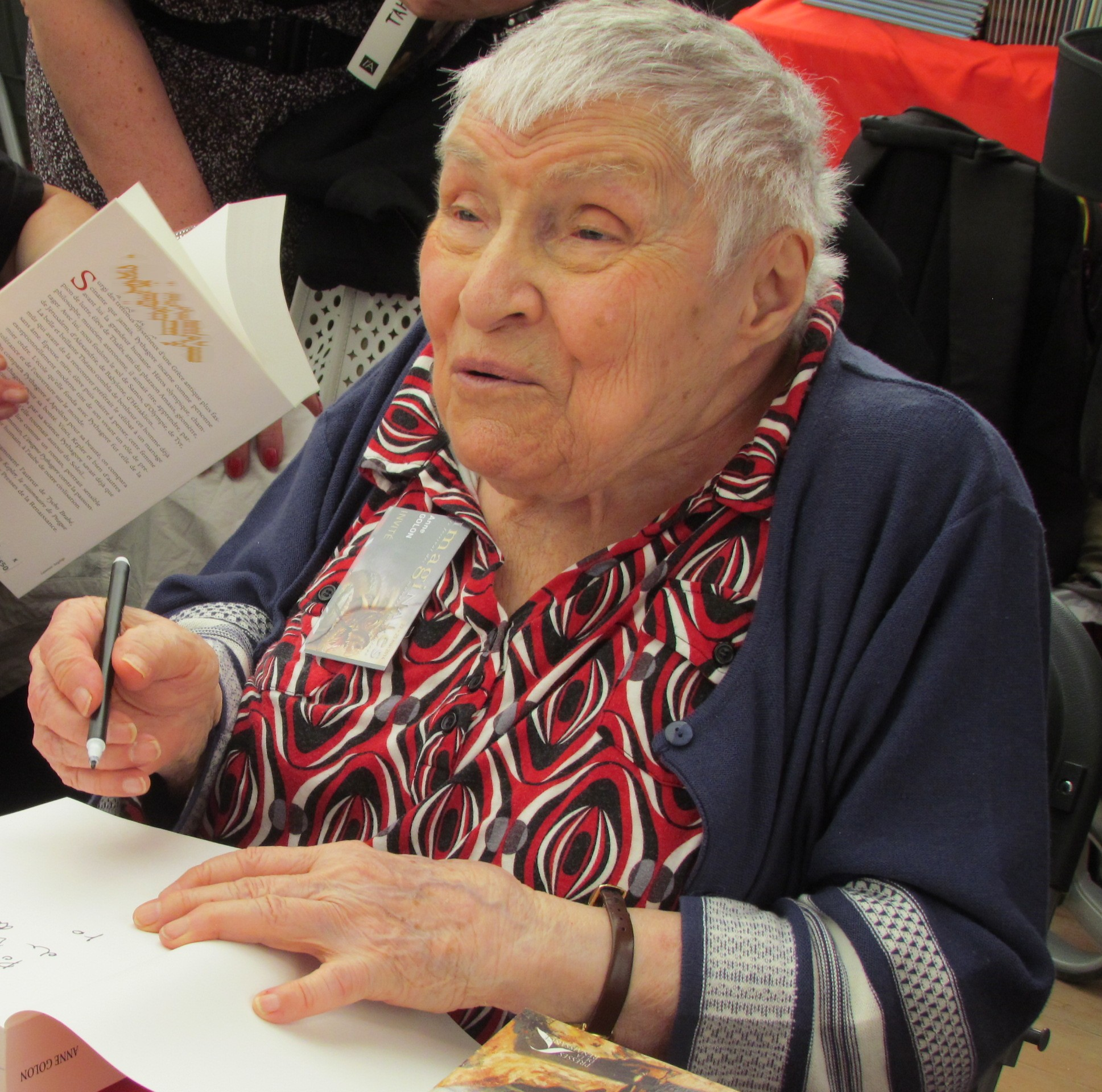
- Anne Golon in May 2014
- Born: Simone Changeux; 17 December 1921; Toulon, France
- Died: 14 July 2017 (aged 95); Le Chesnay, France
- Occupation: Novelist
- Spouse: Serge Golon
- Children: 4 (including Pierre Goloubinoff)
- Writing career
- Pen name: Joëlle Danterne; Sergeanne Golon
- Genres: Adventure; historical fiction; romance
- Notable work: Angélique series

Anne Golon (17 December 1921 – 14 July 2017) was a French author, better known to English-speaking readers as Sergeanne Golon. Her Angélique novels have reportedly sold 150 million copies worldwide and have inspired multiple adaptations.

== Biography ==
Anne Golon was born as Simone Changeux on 17 December 1921 in Toulon, a port in south-eastern France. She was the daughter of Pierre Changeux, a scientist and a captain in the French Navy. She was interested in painting and writing from early childhood and published her first novel, The Country From Behind My Eyes, when she was 18 under the pen name Joëlle Danterne. During World War II, she travelled via bicycle through France to Spain. She wrote using different pen names, helped create France Magazine, and was awarded a literary prize for The Patrol of the Saint Innocents.

She was sent to Africa as a journalist, where, in 1947, she met her future husband, Vsevolod Sergeïvich Goloubinoff, better known as Serge Golon. They collaborated on Angélique: Marquise of the Angels (1956), the first installment in the Angélique series. The novel was an overnight success. When originally published in France, the Angélique novels were credited to both Anne and Serge Golon – Anne being the author and Serge having done much of the historical research. The two names were later combined as "Sergeanne Golon" by British publishers when the series was translated into English.

The popularity of the Angélique novels led to a series of five feature films directed by Bernard Borderie in the 1960s. The actress Michèle Mercier played Angélique, and Robert Hossein played her husband, Joffrey de Peyrac.

In 1972, Anne and Serge travelled to Canada to research a new Angélique novel. That year, as Anne wrote Angélique and the Ghosts, Serge died.

Anne carried on writing and brought up her four children at the same time. Between Serge's death in 1972 and 1985, Anne wrote four more volumes, beginning with the second half of Ghosts (published in France as a single volume, Angélique in Quebec) and proceeding through La Victoire d'Angélique.

By the 1990s, Anne was reduced to a state close to poverty and filed a lawsuit against the French publisher Hachette for abuse of copyright and unpaid royalties. In 2006, after a legal battle lasting nearly a decade, she reached an agreement which left her the sole owner of the Angélique series.

On 14 July 2017, she died from peritonitis in Versailles, France.

== Publications ==
- Angélique: Marquise of the Angels (Angélique, marquise des anges, 1957) (Note: The first two novels were originally published in France as a single 800-plus page volume titled Angélique.)
- Angélique: The Road to Versailles (Angélique : le Chemin de Versailles, 1958)
- Angélique and the King (Angélique et le Roy, 1959)
- Angélique and the Sultan (Indomptable Angélique, 1960) (Note: Literally translated as "Indomitable Angélique" or "Untamable Angélique". Also published in English as Angélique in Barbary.)
- Angélique in Revolt (Angélique se révolte, 1961)
- Angélique in Love (Angélique et son amour, 1961)
- The Countess Angélique (Angélique et le Nouveau Monde, 1964) (Note: Literally translated as "Angélique and the New World".)
- The Temptation of Angélique (La Tentation d'Angélique, 1966) (Note: Published in Canada as The Temptation of Angélique 1: The Jesuit Trap and The Temptation of Angélique 2: The Downfall of Goldbeard.)
- Angélique and the Demon (Angélique et la Démone, 1972)
- Angélique and the Ghosts (Angélique et le Complot des Ombres, 1976) (Note: Literally translated as "Angélique and the Conspiracy of Shadows".)
- Angélique à Québec (1980)
- Angélique, la Route de l'Espoir (1984)
- La Victoire d'Angélique (1985)
