= Serge Golon =

Russian-French geochemist and artist

Vsevolod Sergeevich Golubinov
- Born: August 23, 1903.

Serge Golon (born Vsevolod Sergeevich Golubinov, Russian: Всеволод Серге́евич Голубинов; 23 August 1903 – 12 July 1972) was a Russian-French geochemist. He is known as the husband of French author Anne Golon, author the Angélique series.

== Biography ==
Golon was a Russian aristocrat, born in Bukhara, Turkestan; his father was the tsar's consul in Isfahan.

In 1920, he emigrated from Constantinople to France. He graduated from the École nationale supérieure des industries chimiques (ENSIC), an engineering school dedicated to chemical engineering in Nancy, France.

In the 1940s, he worked in the French Congo, Africa, led the cement and tanneries, and worked on the gold mine. He met Simone Changeux (known as Anne) there and returned to France with her. They had four children together, one of whom is the biochemist and author Pierre Goloubinoff.

In 1954, he and his wife released a memoir about their stay in Africa titled Au Cœur bêtes sauvages. They also collaborated on the popular Angélique novel series set in the 17th century, with Golon providing historical research.

In 1961, he began painting. In 1968, he held his first solo art exhibition in Crans-Montana, Switzerland.

In 1972, Golon and his wife travelled to Quebec, Canada, to research their latest Angélique novel. He died from a heart attack there.
