= List of French films of 1959 =

A list of films produced in France in 1959.

| Title | Director | Cast | Genre | Notes |
|---|---|---|---|---|
| 125 Rue Montmartre | Gilles Grangier | Lino Ventura, Andréa Parisy, Dora Doll | Crime | |
| The 400 Blows | François Truffaut | Jean-Pierre Léaud, Robert Beauvais, Claire Maurier | Drama | |
| All the Boys Are Called Patrick | Jean-Luc Godard | | Drama (short) | |
| Archimède le clochard | Gilles Grangier | Jean Gabin, Darry Cowl, Bernard Blier | Comedy, Drama | French-Italian co-production |
| Beast at Bay | Pierre Chenal | Françoise Arnoul, Henri Vidal | Thriller | |
| The Big Chief | Henri Verneuil | Fernandel, Gino Cervi, Florence Blot | Comedy | Co-production with Italy |
| Black Orpheus | Marcel Camus | Breno Mello, Marpessa Dawn, Léa Garcia | Fantasy, romance | French-Italian-Brazilian co-production |
| Butterfly Minute | Jean Lefèvre | Fernand Raynaud, André Gabriello Françoise Delbart | Comedy | |
| Charley's Godmother | Pierre Chevalier | Fernand Raynaud, Claude Véga, Annie Auberson, Renée Caron, Monique Vita | Comedy | |
| The Chasers | Jean-Pierre Mocky | Jacques Charrier, Charles Aznavour, Dany Robin, Dany Carrel, Estella Blain, Anouk Aimée, Belinda Lee | Drama | |
| Checkerboard | Claude Bernard-Aubert | Grégoire Aslan, Toto Bissainthe, Roger Blin | Drama | Co-production with Italy |
| Cigarettes, Whiskey and Wild Women | Maurice Régamey | Annie Cordy, Pierre Mondy | Comedy | Co-production with Italy |
| Come Dance with Me | Michel Boisrond | Brigitte Bardot, Henri Vidal, Dawn Addams | Mystery | French-Italian co-production |
| Les Cousins | Claude Chabrol | Gérard Blain, Jean-Claude Brialy, Juliette Mayniel | Drama | |
| The Cow and I | Henri Verneuil | Fernandel, René Havard, Ingeborg Schöner | Comedy-Drama | French-Italian co-production |
| Deathmatch | Claude Bernard-Aubert | Gérard Blain, Antonella Lualdi | Drama | Co-production with Italy |
| Double Agents | Robert Hossein | Robert Hossein, Marina Vlady | Thriller | French-Italian co-production |
| Du rififi chez les femmes | Alex Joffé | Nadja Tiller, Robert Hossein, Silvia Monfort | Crime | French-Italian co-production |
| Eyes of Love | Denys de La Patellière | Danielle Darrieux, Jean-Claude Brialy | Drama | Co-production with Italy |
| The Female | Julien Duvivier | Brigitte Bardot, António Vilar, Lila Kedrova | Drama | French-Italian production |
| La Fievre Monte a El Pao | Luis Buñuel | Gérard Philipe, María Félix, Jean Servais | Drama | French-Mexican production |
| The Gendarme of Champignol | Jean Bastia | Jean Richard, Roger Pierre, Noël Roquevert | Comedy | |
| General Della Rovere | Roberto Rossellini | Vittorio De Sica, Hannes Messemer, Vittorio Caprioli | Drama | Italian-French co-production |
| The Giant of Marathon | Jacques Tourneur | Steve Reeves, Mylène Demongeot | Action adventure | Co-produced with Italy |
| Gorilla's Waltz | Bernard Borderie | Charles Vanel, Jess Hahn, Ursula Herking | Crime | |
| The Green Mare | Claude Autant-Lara | Bourvil, Francis Blanche, Sandra Milo, Yves Robert | Comedy, drama, history | Co-production with Italy |
| Guinguette | Jean Delannoy | Zizi Jeanmaire, Jean-Claude Pascal, Paul Meurisse | Comedy drama | Co-production with Italy |
| Head Against the Wall | Georges Franju | Pierre Brasseur, Paul Meurisse, Jean-Pierre Mocky, Anouk Aimée | Drama | |
| Head of a Tyrant | Fernando Cerchio | Massimo Girotti, Isabelle Corey | Historical | Co-production with Italy |
| Hercules Unchained | Pietro Francisci | Steve Reeves, Sylvia Lopez, Sylva Koscina | Adventure, fantasy | Italian-French co-production |
| Hiroshima Mon Amour | Alain Resnais | Emmanuelle Riva, Eiji Okada, Stella Dassas | Drama | Co-production with Japan |
| Hit and Run | Bernard Borderie | Antonella Lualdi, Félix Marten, Aimè Clariond | Crime | French-Italian-Yugoslav co-production |
| Houla Houla | Robert Darène | Fernand Raynaud, Noël Roquevert | Comedy | |
| The Indestructible | Jean Boyer | Fernandel, Line Renaud, Michel Galabru | Comedy | |
| The Indian Tomb | Fritz Lang | Debra Paget, Paul Christian, Paul Hubschmid | Adventure | West German-French-Italian co-production |
| Island Fishermen | Pierre Schoendoerffer | Jean-Claude Pascal, Juliette Mayniel, Charles Vanel | Adventure | |
| I Spit on Your Grave | Michel Gast | Christian Marquand, Antonella Lualdi, Renate Ewert | Crime | |
| It Only Happens to the Living | Tony Saytor | Raymond Pellegrin, Magali Noël | Drama mystery thriller | |
| Julie the Redhead | Claude Boissol | Daniel Gélin, Pascale Petit, Margo Lion | Comedy | |
| Les Liaisons Dangereuses | Roger Vadim | Jeanne Moreau, Gérard Philipe, Jeanne Valérie | Drama | French-Italian co-production |
| The Little Professor | Carlo Rim | Darry Cowl, Yves Robert | Comedy | |
| The Lovers of Tomorrow | Marcel Blistène | Édith Piaf, Michel Auclair, Armand Mestral | Drama musical mystery | |
| Magnificent Sinner | Robert Siodmak | Romy Schneider, Curd Jurgens | Drama, Historical, Romance | |
| Maigret and the Saint-Fiacre Case | Jean Delannoy | Jean Gabin, Valentine Tessier, Michel Auclair | Crime | Co-production with Italy |
| Marriage of Fiagaro | Jean Meyer | Jean Piat, Jean Meyer, Louis Seigner, Georges Chamarat, Georges Descrières, Maurice Porterat, Georges Baconnet, Jean-Paul Roussillon, Louis Eymond, Henri Tisot | Comedy | |
| Marie-Octobre | Julien Duvivier | Danielle Darrieux, Bernard Blier | Mystery | |
| Marie of the Isles | Pierre Maudru | Belinda Lee, Alain Saury, Darío Moreno | Adventure | Co-production with Italy |
| Milk Soup | Pierre Chevalier | Geneviève Kervine, Jean Bretonnière | Comedy | |
| Nathalie, Secret Agent | Henri Decoin | Martine Carol, Félix Marten, Darío Moreno | Comedy | Co-production with Italy |
| The Night of the Hunted | Bernard-Roland | Philippe Clay, Juliette Mayniel, Sami Frey | Crime | Co-production with Belgium |
| Nina | Jean Boyer | Sophie Desmarets, Olivier Hussenot, Agnès Laurent | Comedy | |
| Toi, le venin | Robert Hossein | Robert Hossein, Marina Vlady, Odile Versois | Mystery | Co-production with Italy |
| Pensione Edelweiss | Ottorino Franco Bertolini, Víctor Merenda | Henri Vidal, Dawn Addams, Lino Ventura | Drama thriller | Co-production with Italy |
| Picnic on the Grass | Jean Renoir | Paul Meurisse, Blavette, André Brunot Régine Blaes | Comedy Romance | |
| Pickpocket | Robert Bresson | Martin LaSalle, Marika Green, Pierre Leymarie | Drama | |
| Quay of Illusions | Émile Couzinet | Gaby Morlay, Louis Seigner, Lise Bourdin | Drama | Co-production with Italy |
| The Restless and the Damned | Yves Allégret | Edmond O'Brien, Richard Basehart, Andrea Parisy, Nicole Berger, Nigel Lovell, Reg Lye, Jean Marchat, Denise Vernac | Drama | Co-production with Italy and Australian |
| The Road to Shame | Édouard Molinaro | Robert Hossein, Magali Noël, Estella Blain, Philippe Clay | Crime | |
| Rue de Paris | Denys de La Patellière | Jean Gabin, Marie-José Nat, Claude Brasseur, Roger Dumas | Comedy drama | Co-production with Italy |
| Signé Arsène Lupin | Yves Robert | Robert Lamoureux, Alida Valli | Comedy crime | Co-production with Italy |
| The Sign of Leo | Éric Rohmer | Jess Hahn, Michèle Girardon, Van Doude | Comedy-drama | |
| Stars at Noon | Jacques Ertaud, Marcel Ichac | Roger Blin | Adventure | Entered into the 9th Berlin International Film Festival |
| Strange Phenomena | Robert Vernay | Sophie Desmarets, Philippe Clay | Comedy | |
| The Tiger Attacks | Maurice Labro | Lino Ventura, Estella Blain, Paul Frankeur | Crime | |
| The Tiger of Eschnapur | Fritz Lang | Debra Paget, Paul Hubschmid, Claus Holm | Adventure | West German-French-Italian co-production |
| This Desired Body | Luis Saslavsky | Daniel Gélin, Dany Carrel, Maurice Ronet, Belinda Lee | Drama | |
| Tonight We Kill | Ivan Govar | Pierre Trabaud, Dominique Wilms, René Dary | Action thriller | Co-production with Belgium |
| Too Late to Love | Henri Decoin | Michèle Morgan, Henri Vidal | Drama | |
| Twelve Hours By the Clock | Géza von Radványi | Lino Ventura, Eva Bartok, Hannes Messemer, Laurent Terzieff | Crime | Co-production with West Germany |
| Venetian Honeymoon | Alberto Cavalcanti | Martine Carol, Vittorio De Sica, Philippe Nicaud | Romantic comedy | Co-production with Italy |
| The Verdict | Jean Valère | Marina Vlady, Robert Hossein | Drama war | Entered into the 1st Moscow International Film Festival |
| Visa to Hell | Alfred Rode | Claudine Dupuis, Jean Gaven, Pierre Dudan, Georges Rivière, Nadine Tallier | Crime | |
| Way of Youth | Michel Boisrond | Françoise Arnoul, Bourvil, Lino Ventura, Alain Delon | Drama | |
| Witness in the City | Édouard Molinaro | Lino Ventura, Sandra Milo, Franco Fabrizi | Crime | Co-production with Italy |
| The Wreckers | Charles Brabant | Henri Vidal, Dany Carrel, Charles Vanel, Renée Cosima | Adventure | |
| The Woman's Confident | Jean Boyer | Fernandel, Sylva Koscina, Ugo Tognazzi | Comedy | Co-production with Italy |
| Women Are Weak | Michel Boisrond | Alain Delon, Mylène Demongeot, Pascale Petit, Jacqueline Sassard | Comedy Romance | |
| You Have Nothing to Declare? | Clément Duhour | Darry Cowl, Jean Richard, Jean Poiret, Michel Serrault | Comedy | |

== See also ==
- 1959 in France
- 1959 in French television
