= List of French films of 1968 =

This is a list of films produced in France in 1968.

French films released in 1968
Title	Director	Cast	Genre	Notes
17th Parallel: Vietnam in War	Joris Ivens		Documentary	
24 Hours in the Life of a Woman	Dominique Delouche	Danielle Darrieux, Robert Hoffmann, Lena Skerla	Drama, romance	French-West German co-production
Adieu l'ami	Jean Herman	Alain Delon, Charles Bronson, Olga Georges-Picot	Crime, thriller	French-Italian co-production
Angelique and the Sultan	Bernard Borderie	Michèle Mercier, Robert Hossein, Jean-Claude Pascal	Adventure	Co-production with Italy and West Germany
Asterix and Cleopatra	René Goscinny, Albert Uderzo, Lee Payant		Adventure, comedy	Belgian-French co-production, animated film
Barbarella	Roger Vadim	Jane Fonda, John Phillip Law, Anita Pallenberg	Science fiction	French-Italian co-production
Beru and These Women	Guy Lefranc	Gérard Barray, Jean Richard	Comedy crime	
The Bride Wore Black	François Truffaut	Jeanne Moreau, Charles Denner, Jean-Claude Brialy	Thriller	French-Italian co-production
Candy	Christian Marquand	Charles Aznavour, Marlon Brando, Richard Burton	Comedy	French-Italian co-production
Danger: Diabolik	Mario Bava	John Phillip Law, Marisa Mell, Michel Piccoli	Action	Italian-French co-production
Darling Caroline	Denys de La Patellière	France Anglade, Vittorio De Sica, Bernard Blier	Historical	Co-production with Italy and West Germany
The Day of the Owl	Damiano Damiani	Franco Nero, Claudia Cardinale, Lee J. Cobb	Crime	Italian-French co-production
Deux fois	Jackie Raynal	Jackie Raynal, Francisco Viader, Oscar	Experimental feminist	
Franciscan of Bourges	Claude Autant-Lara	Hardy Krüger, Béatrix Dussane	War	
The Girl on a Motorcycle	Jack Cardiff	Alain Delon, Marianne Faithfull, Roger Mutton	Drama	British-French co-production
The Great Silence	Sergio Corbucci	Jean-Louis Trintignant, Klaus Kinski, Frank Wolff	Western	Italian-French co-production
Ho!	Robert Enrico	Jean-Paul Belmondo	Crime	French-Italian co-production
The Immortal Story	Orson Welles	Jeanne Moreau, Orson Welles, Roger Coggio	Drama	
Je t'aime, je t'aime	Alain Resnais	Claude Rich, Olga Georges-Picot, Anouk Ferjac	Drama Sci-fi	
La chamade	Alain Cavalier	Catherine Deneuve, Michel Piccoli, Roger Van Hool	Drama	French-Italian co-production
La Prisonniere	Henri-Georges Clouzot	Laurent Terzieff, Elisabeth Wiener	Drama	
Le gendarme se marie	Jean Girault	Louis de Funès, Michel Galabru, Jean Lefebvre	Comedy	French-Italian co-production
Le Viol du Vampire	Jean Rollin	Solange Pradel, Bernard Letrou, Nicole Romain	Horror	
Leontine	Michel Audiard	Françoise Rosay, Bernard Blier, Marlène Jobert	Comedy	
Les Biches	Claude Chabrol	Stéphane Audran, Jean-Louis Trintignant, Jean-Louis Trintignant	Drama	French-Italian co-production
Les Gauloises bleues	Michel Cournot	Jean-Pierre Kalfon, Annie Girardot, Nella Bielski	Drama	
The Man Who Lies	Alain Robbe-Grillet	Jean-Louis Trintignant	War	French-Italian-Czechoslovak co-production with
Manon 70	Jean Aurel	Catherine Deneuve, Jean-Claude Brialy, Sami Frey	Drama	French-Italian-West German co-production
Naked Childhood	Maurice Pialat		Drama	
The Private Lesson	Michel Boisrond	Nathalie Delon, Renaud Verley, Robert Hossein	Drama	
The Return of Monte Cristo	André Hunebelle	Paul Barge, Claude Jade, Anny Duperey	adventure	
Le Révélateur	Philippe Garrel	Laurent Terzieff, Bernadette Lafont	Drama	
Salut Berthe!	Guy Lefranc	Fernand Raynaud, Darry Cowl	Comedy	
Spirits of the Dead	Federico Fellini, Louis Malle, Roger Vadim	Terence Stamp, Alain Delon, Peter Fonda	Horror	French-Italian co-production
Stolen Kisses	François Truffaut	Jean-Pierre Léaud, Claude Jade, Delphine Seyrig	Comedy-drama, romance	
The Unfaithful Wife	Claude Chabrol	Stéphane Audran, Michel Bouquet, Maurice Ronet	Drama	French-Italian co-production

== See also ==
- 1968 in France

== Notes ==
=== References ===
- Curti, Roberto (2013). Italian Crime Filmography, 1968-1980. McFarland. ISBN 978-0786469765.
