= List of French films of 1957 =

French films released in 1957

A list of films produced in France in 1957.

== A-Z ==
Title	Director	Cast	Genre	Notes
The Adventures of Arsène Lupin	Jacques Becker	Robert Lamoureux, Liselotte Pulver, O.E. Hasse	Crime	Entered into the 7th Berlin International Film Festival
An Evening at the Music Hall	Henri Decoin	Eddie Constantine, Zizi Jeanmaire, Yves Robert	Comedy musical	
An Eye for an Eye	André Cayatte	Curd Jürgens, Folco Lulli, Lea Padovani	Thriller	Co-production with Italy
And Through Here the Exit	Willy Rozier	Tony Wright, Dominique Wilms	Comedy thriller	
Anyone Can Kill Me	Henri Decoin	François Périer, Peter van Eyck, Anouk Aimée	Crime	Co-production with Italy
The Bear's Skin	Claude Boissol	Jean Richard, Nicole Courcel	Comedy	
The Big Bluff	Patrice Dally	Eddie Constantine, Dominique Wilms	Comedy drama	
Bitter Victory	Nicholas Ray	Richard Burton, Curd Jürgens, Ruth Roman	War	Co-production with the US
A Bomb for a Dictator	Alex Joffé	Pierre Fresnay, Michel Auclair, Tilda Thamar	Thriller	
Burning Fuse	Henri Decoin	Raymond Pellegrin, Charles Vanel, Peter van Eyck	Thriller	Co-production with Italy
The Case of Doctor Laurent	Jean-Paul Le Chanois	Jean Gabin, Nicole Courcel, Silvia Monfort	Drama	
Charming Boys	Henri Decoin	Zizi Jeanmaire, Daniel Gélin, Henri Vidal	Musical	
Clandestine Paris	Walter Kapps	Claudine Dupuis, Armand Mestral, Danielle Godet	Crime	
Les Collégiennes	André Hunebelle	Marie-Hélène Arnaud, Christine Carère, Gaby Morlay	Drama	
The Crucible	Raymond Rouleau	Simone Signoret, Yves Montand, Mylène Demongeot	Historical drama	Co-production with East Germany. Won BAFTA Award, +2 wins, +2 nominations
Delincuentes	Juan Forttuny	Ginette Leclerc, Raymond Bussières, Christine Carère	Crime	
Easiest Profession	Jean Boyer	Fernandel, Maria Mauban, Ginette Leclerc	Comedy	
Élisa	Roger Richebé	Dany Carrel, Serge Reggiani, Valentine Tessier	Drama	
Explosive Vacation!	Christian Stengel	Arletty, Raymond Bussières, Marthe Mercadier	Comedy	
Fernand the Tramp	Pierre Chevalier	Fernand Raynaud, Renée Devillers, Magali Vendeuil, Jean-Marc Tennberg	Comedy	
The Flapper	Jacqueline Audry	Fernand Gravey, Andrée Debar, Jean Danet	Drama	
The Fox of Paris	Paul May	Hardy Krüger, Marianne Koch, Michel Auclair	War thriller	Co-production with West Germany
A Friend of the Family	Jack Pinoteau	Darry Cowl, Raymond Bussières, Annette Poivre	Comedy	
Fugitive in Saigon	Marcel Camus	Daniel Gélin, Lucien Callamand, Jacques Chancel	War	
Gates of Paris	René Clair	Pierre Brasseur, Georges Brassens, Henri Vidal Dany Carrel	Crime	Co-production with Italy
The Handcuffs Polka	Raoul André	Jean Lefebvre, Mischa Auer, Pascale Audret	Comedy	
He Who Must Die	Jules Dassin	Jean Servais, Carl Möhner, Grégoire Aslan	Drama	Entered into the 1957 Cannes Film Festival. Co-production with Italy
The Inspector Likes a Fight	Jean Devaivre	Nicole Courcel, Paul Meurisse, Jean Tissier	Crime	
Irresistible Catherine	André Pergament	Michel Auclair, Marie Daëms, Fernand Sardou	Comedy	
Isabelle Is Afraid of Men	Jean Gourguet	Cathia Caro, Roger Dumas, Simone Paris	Drama	
Judicial Police	Maurice de Canonge	Anne Vernon, Henri Vilbert, Robert Manuel, Yves Vincent	Crime	
A Kiss for a Killer	Henri Verneuil	Henri Vidal, Mylène Demongeot, Isa Miranda	Crime mystery	
La Parisienne	Michel Boisrond	Charles Boyer, Henri Vidal, Brigitte Bardot	Comedy	Co-production with Italy
Les Espions	Henri-Georges Clouzot	Curd Jurgens, Vera Clouzot, Peter Ustinov	Mystery	
Les Lavandières du Portugal	Pierre Gaspard-Huit	Jean-Claude Pascal, Anne Vernon, Paquita Rico	Comedy	Co-production with Spain
Let's Be Daring, Madame	Robert Vernay	Dany Robin, Marie Daëms, Noël Roquevert	Comedy	
Like a Hair in the Soup	Maurice Régamey	Louis de Funès, Nadine Tallier	Comedy	
Love in Jamaica	André Berthomieu	Luis Mariano, Jane Sourza, Paquita Rico	Drama	
Love Is at Stake	Marc Allégret	Robert Lamoureux, Annie Girardot, Jacques Jouanneau	Comedy	
Lovers and Thieves	Sacha Guitry	Jean Poiret, Michel Serrault, Clément Duhour	Comedy drama	
Lovers of Paris	Julien Duvivier	Gérard Philipe, Dany Carrel, Anouk Aimée	Drama	
Mademoiselle and Her Gang	Jean Boyer	Line Renaud, Jean Carmet, Noël Roquevert	Comedy crime	
The Man in the Raincoat	Julien Duvivier	Fernandel, Bernard Blier, Claude Sylvain	Comedy	Entered into the 7th Berlin International Film Festival
The Mysteries of Paris	Fernando Cerchio	Frank Villard, Yvette Lebon, Lorella De Luca	Drama	Co-production with Italy
Nathalie	Christian-Jaque	Martine Carol, Mischa Auer Michel Piccoli	Comedy	Co-production with Italy
A Night at the Moulin Rouge	Jean-Claude Roy	Tilda Thamar, Noël Roquevert, Jean Tissier	Comedy	
Nights of Cabiria	Federico Fellini	Giulietta Masina, François Périer, Amedeo Nazzari	Drama	Co-production with Italy
No Sun in Venice	Roger Vadim	Françoise Arnoul, Christian Marquand, Robert Hossein	Drama	Co-production with Italy. Entered into the 7th Berlin International Film Festival
The Nude Set	Pierre Foucaud	Philippe Nicaud, Agnès Laurent, Dora Doll	Comedy	
On Foot, on Horse, and on Wheels	Maurice Delbez	Noël-Noël, Denise Grey, Sophie Daumier	Comedy	
OSS 117 Is Not Dead	Jean Sacha	Ivan Desny, Magali Noël, Yves Vincent	Spy	
The Ostrich Has Two Eggs	Denys de La Patellière	Pierre Fresnay, Simone Renant, Georges Poujouly	Comedy	
Paris Music Hall	Stany Cordier	Mick Micheyl, Charles Aznavour, Geneviève Kervine, Jean Bretonnière, Vanja Orico	Musical	
Retour de manivelle	Denys de La Patellière	Michèle Morgan, Daniel Gélin, Michèle Mercier	Crime	
The River of Three Junks	André Pergament	Dominique Wilms, Lise Bourdin, Jean Gaven	Adventure	
The Schemer	Gilles Grangier	Michel Auclair, Paul Frankeur, Giani Esposito, Annie Girardot	Crime	
Send a Woman When the Devil Fails	Yves Allégret	Edwige Feuillère, Jean Servais, Jean Debucourt	Crime	
Sénéchal the Magnificent	Jean Boyer	Fernandel, Nadia Gray, Madeleine Barbulée	Comedy	Co-production with Italy
The Seventh Commandment	Raymond Bernard	Edwige Feuillère, Jacques Dumesnil, Jacques Morel	Comedy	
The She-Wolves	Luis Saslavsky	François Périer, Micheline Presle, Jeanne Moreau	Drama	
The Singer from Mexico	Richard Pottier	Luis Mariano, Annie Cordy, Tilda Thamar	Musical	Co-production with Spain
Speaking of Murder	Gilles Grangier	Jean Gabin, Paul Frankeur, Marcel Bozzuffi	Crime	
The Strange Mr. Steve	Raymond Bailly	Jeanne Moreau, Philippe Lemaire, Armand Mestral	Mystery thriller	
The Suspects	Jean Dréville	Charles Vanel, Anne Vernon, Maurice Teynac	Crime	
Sylviane of My Nights	Marcel Blistène	Gisèle Pascal, Frank Villard	Comedy drama	
This Pretty World	Carlo Rim	Yves Deniaud, Micheline Dax, Darry Cowl	Comedy	
Three Days to Live	Gilles Grangier	Daniel Gélin, Jeanne Moreau, Lino Ventura	Crime	
Three Make a Pair	Sacha Guitry	Michel Simon, Sophie Desmarets, Jean Rigaux	Comedy	
Three Sailors	Maurice de Canonge	Marcel Merkès, Henri Génès, Jeannette Batti	Comedy	
The Tricyclist	Jacques Pinoteau	Darry Cowl, Beatrice Altariba, Pierre Mondy	Sports comedy	
Typhoon Over Nagasaki	Yves Ciampi	Danielle Darrieux, Jean Marais, Keiko Kishi	Drama romance	Co-production with Japan & West Germany
Until the Last One	Pierre Billon	Raymond Pellegrin, Jeanne Moreau, Paul Meurisse	Thriller	Co-production with Italy
The Violent	Henri Calef	Paul Meurisse, Françoise Fabian, Fernand Ledoux	Mystery	
What a Team!	Roland Quignon	Louise Carletti, Pierre Trabaud, Sydney Bechet, Dora Doll	Comedy musical	
The Wheel	Maurice Delbez, André Haguet	Jean Servais, Pierre Mondy, Claude Laydu	Drama	
Whereabouts Unknown	Jean Stelli	Frank Villard, Barbara Laage, Fernand Fabre	Thriller	
White Nights	Luchino Visconti	Maria Schell, Marcello Mastroianni, Jean Marais	Drama	Co-production with Italy
Young Girls Beware	Yves Allégret	Antonella Lualdi, Robert Hossein, Jacqueline Porel	Crime	

== Short films ==
Title	Director	Cast	Genre	Notes
Les têtes interverties	Alejandro Jodorowsky	Micheline Beauchemin	Fantasy (short)	Mime version of Thomas Mann's play
The Seine Meets Paris	Joseph Ivens		Documentary (short)	Won Palme d'Or

== See also ==
- 1957 in France
- 1957 in French television
