= Tales of Paris =

1962 film

- Theatrical release poster
- French: Les parisiennes
- Directed by: Marc Allégret; Claude Barma; Michel Boisrond; Jacques Poitrenaud
- Written by: Annette Wademant; Claude Barma; Roger Vadim; Jacques Armand; Jean-Loup Dabadie
- Produced by: Francis Cosne
- Starring: Françoise Arnoul; Françoise Brion; Catherine Deneuve; Elina Labourdette; Dany Robin; Darry Cowl; Paul Guers; Johnny Hallyday; Christian Marquand; Jean Poiret; J.L. de Villalonga
- Cinematography: Armand Thirard; Henri Alekan
- Edited by: Léonide Azar
- Music by: Georges Garvarentz
- Production companies: Francos Films; Incei Film
- Distributed by: Cinédis
- Release date: 17 January 1962 (France)
- Running time: 105 minutes
- Countries: France; Italy
- Language: French
- Box office: 2,020,729 admissions (France)

Tales of Paris (French: Les Parisiennes) is a 1962 comedy-drama anthology film consisting of four segments.

== Cast ==
=== Sophie ===
- Catherine Deneuve as Sophie
- Johnny Hallyday as Jean Allard
- Elina Labourdette as Jacqueline
- Gillian Hills as Theodora
- Gisèle Sandré as Suzanne
- Berthe Granval as Suzanne
- France Anglade as a college girl
- Danièle Évenou as a college girl
- Paloma Matta as a college girl
- J.L. de Villalonga as Louis
- Yves Barsacq as the traveler
- Henri Attal as a passenger
- Dominique Zardi as a passenger

* Director: Marc Allégret. Screenplay: Marc Allégret, Francis Cosne, Roger Vadim. Cinematography : Armand Thirard

=== Françoise ===
- Françoise Arnoul as Françoise
- Françoise Brion as Jacqueline
- Paul Guers as Michel
- François Patrice as the playboy

* Director: Claude Barma. Screenplay: Jacques Armand, Claude Barma, Claude Brulé. Cinematography: Armand Thirard

=== Antonia ===
- Christian Marquand as Christian Lénier
- Jean Poiret as Jean-Pierre Leroy
- Dany Robin as Antonia
- Bernard Lavalette as Richard

* Director: Michel Boisrond. Screenplay: Michel Boisrond, Francis Cosne, Annette Wademant. Cinematography: Henri Alekan.

=== Ella ===
- Darry Cowl as Hubert Parker
- Dany Saval as Ella
- Françoise Giret as Juliette
- Anne-Marie Bellini as Ella's friend
- Ellen Bahl as Ella's friend
- Olga Georges-Picot as the secretary
- Henri Tisot as Éric
- Jack Ary as Pidoux
- Serge Marquand as taxi driver
- Donald O'Brien as American tourist
- Les Chaussettes Noires as themselves
- Eddy Mitchell as himself

* Director: Jacques Poitrenaud. Screenplay: Jean-Loup Dabadie. Cinematography: Henri Alekan.
