= Too Late to Love =

1959 film

Pourquoi viens-tu si tard?
- Directed by: Henri Decoin
- Written by: Albert Valentin (adaptation); Michel Audiard (dialogue)
- Screenplay by: Henri Decoin; Pierre Roustang
- Based on: Claude Brulé (d'apres une idée)
- Produced by: Robert Chabert; Pierre Roustang
- Starring: Michèle Morgan; Henri Vidal
- Cinematography: Christian Matras
- Edited by: Claude Durand
- Music by: Charles Aznavour
- Color process: Black and white
- Production companies: Ulysse Productions; France Cinéma Productions
- Distributed by: Cinédis
- Release date: 6 May 1959
- Running time: 100 minutes
- Country: France
- Language: French

Pourquoi viens-tu si tard? (also known as Why Do You Come So Late? or US title: Too Late to Love) is a 1959 French drama film directed by Henri Decoin and starring Michèle Morgan and Henri Vidal.

== Plot ==
Reporter-photographer Walter Hermelin meets Catherine Ferrer, a lawyer who must plead in a libel suit against a wine company. She asks Walter to help her get exhibits incriminating the wine merchants. The reporter agrees and takes frightening photographs showing how poor people are incited to drink.

== Cast ==
- Michèle Morgan as Maître Catherine Ferrer
- Henri Vidal as Walter Hermelin
- Francis Blanche as Camille - le patron du bistrot
- Marc Cassot as Le psychiatre de la clinique
- Pierre-Louis as Le président du tribunal (as Pierre Louis)
- Evelyne Aznavour as La secrétaire
- Albert Médina as Joseph Ackermann (as Albert Medina)
- Colette Richard as Julie - la patronne de l'hôtel de l'Espérance
- Geymond Vital as Maître Augier - l'avocat général
- Jean Claudio as Le grand-duc russe
- Robert Dalban as Le camelot en vins
- Claude Dauphin as René Dargillière

== See also ==
- List of French films of 1959
