= Annette Wademant =

Belgian screenwriter

- Born: 19 December 1928; Brussels, Belgium
- Died: 1 September 2017 (aged 92); Paris, France
- Occupation: Screenwriter
- Years active: 1951–1979 (film)

Annette Wademant (1928–2017) was a Belgian screenwriter active in the French film industry. She was married to the director Michel Boisrond.

== Selected filmography ==
- Edward and Caroline (1951)
- Casque d'Or (1952)
- Rue de l'Estrapade (1953)
- The Earrings of Madame de… (1953)
- Lola Montès (1955)
- Maid in Paris (1956)
- Women's Club (1956)
- A Kiss for a Killer (1957)
- Typhoon Over Nagasaki (1957)
- La Parisienne (1957)
- Come Dance with Me (1959)
- Women Are Weak (1959)
- Love and the Frenchwoman (1960)
- Un soir sur la plage (1961)
- How to Succeed in Love (1962)
- Tales of Paris (1962)
- Cherchez l'idole (1964)
- How Do You Like My Sister? (1964)
- The Private Lesson (1968)
- Du soleil plein les yeux (1970)
- Dis-moi que tu m'aimes (1974)
- L'enfant secret (1979)

== Bibliography ==
- Gillain, Anne. Truffaut on Cinema. Indiana University Press, 2017.
