= Jacques Nahum =

French director, screenwriter and producer (1921–2017)

- Born: 27 February 1921; Cairo, Egypt
- Died: 21 July 2017 (aged 96); Paris, France
- Citizenship: French
- Education: IDHEC (La Fémis)
- Occupations: Film and television director, producer, writer
- Years active: 1949–2014
- Employer: Mars International Productions
- Known for: Le Saint mène la danse (1960), Une aussi longue absence (1961), Arsène Lupin (1971), Le Cheval de coeur (1995), Pagnol's Marius, Fanny, and César (2000)
- Notable work: Bilitis (1977)
- Spouse: Odette Pinto
- Children: Alain Nahum
- Parent(s): Joab Nahum, Fortunée Palacci
- Relatives: Pallache family
- Awards: Palme d'or, Ordre National du Mérite

Jacques Nahum (27 February 1921 – 21 July 2017) was a French director, screenwriter, and producer, famed for producing the cult television show Arsène Lupin, descended from the Pallache family.

== Background ==
Jacques Nahum was born on 27 February 1921 in Cairo, Egypt. His Sephardic Jewish parents were Joab Nahum of İzmir, Turkey, and Fortunée Palacci of Cairo, Egypt; he had one brother, Robert (1925–1973). Nahum arrived in Paris at the age of 24 and in 1945 began to study at the Institut des hautes études cinématographiques (IDHEC, since 1988 La Fémis).

== Career ==
=== John Berry ===
By the late 1940s, Nahum was an assistant director. In the 1950s, Nahum was first assistant director to American film director John Berry.

Berry went to France to escape the impact of the Hollywood Blacklist. Early in 1950, his documentary The Hollywood Ten was released; thereafter, fellow director Edward Dmytryk denounced him as a communist. After two movies in 1951–1952, Berry hit a dry spell. French film distributor David Medioni hired him for French-distributed movies on a low salary plus percentage in the films. Nahum later explained: "Here was this small-time producer [Medioni]. He knew that John [Berry] had made great films in Hollywood, and thought it would be quite a coup if he could get this big Hollywood director, who had worked with John Garfield, to work on his little B-movie." Berry did not have to have a director's permit under French law and union rules at that time.

For Berry's first film in France, Ça va barder (1955), Nahum's job started as assembling crew. While shooting, Berry, Nahum, and Nahum's friend Jacques-Laurent Bost, modified the story of the first film considerably.

For Tamango (1957), Berry could not find Black actors, so Nahum helped him hire French soldiers from French African colonies. The French soldiers disliked the make-up intensely or anything else that made them feel like African slaves, according to Nahum.

=== Television ===
In 1960, he founded his own production company, Mars International Productions. From 1962 to 1980, he directed 400 commercials.

In 1961, the film Une aussi longue absence, directed by Henri Colpi and co-scripted by Marguerite Duras, for which he was executive producer, shared the Palme d'or at the Cannes Film Festival. In the early 1960s, he directed the film Le Saint mène la danse, which starred Michèle Mercier.

In the 1970s, he turned toward television production, where he would stay for the remainder of his live. Best known among his television works are: Arsène Lupine (1971) starring Georges Descrières, Le Cheval de coeur (1995) starring Guillaume Canet, and Marcel Pagnol's trilogy Marius, Fanny, and César (2000) starring Roger Hanin. His last production was Le chapeau de Mitterrand (2014).

== Personal life and death ==
Nahum married Odette Pinto. They had one child, Alain Nahum, also a film director as well as photographer. Nahum died on 21 July 2017, in Paris, France.

== Legacy ==
Dominique Ambiel, often a co-producer, called him:

"Pionnier dans la production de séries télévisées populaires, il est aussi l'un des premiers à mener des coproductions internationales d'envergure et à initier des films patrimoniaux et de grande qualité pour la télévision. (Pioneer in the production of popular television series, he is also one of the first to carry out major international co-productions and to initiate high-quality films for television.)"

== Awards ==
- Palme d'or (1961)
- Chevalier dans l'Ordre national du Mérite

== Filmography ==
Nahum's major works span a half century.

=== Producer ===
- 1961: Une aussi longue absence
- 1971: Arsène Lupin (TV series)
- 1977: Bilitis
- 1980: Sam et Sally
- 1982: Salut, j'arrive
- 1983: L'Art d'aimer
- 1986: Le Tiroir secret (TV series)
- 1990: Le retour d'Arsène Lupin (TV series)
- 1995: Le Cheval de Cœur
- 1997: L'enfant Perdu de Christian Faure
- 1998: À nous deux la vie
- 1999: La Femme du boulanger
- 2000: La Trilogie Marseillaise - Marius, Fanny, César
- 2002 - 2003: Action Justice (TV series)
- 2004: Le Président Ferrare (TV series)
- 2007: Le temps des secrets - Le temps des amours
- 2009: Des gens qui passent
- 2012: La Chartreuse de Parme
- 2014: Le Chapeau de Mitterrand

=== Director ===
- 1954: Face of Paris episode "Your favorite story"
- 1960: Le Saint mène la danse (AKA Le Saint conduit le bal)
- 1967: Yves Robert un chemin de la liberté
- 1971: Madame Simone (also writer)
- 1973: Le Double Assassinat de la rue Morgue
- 1974: Eugène Sue (film)
- 1975: Maître Pygmalion
- 1975: Les Grands Détectives episode "Six hommes morts"

=== Second Unit Director or Assistant Director ===
- 1955: Ça va barder by John Berry
- 1955: Je suis un sentimental by John Berry
- 1956: Don Juan by John Berry
- 1958: Tamango by John Berry

=== Writer ===
- 1952: The Face of Paris (co-writer)
- 2012: La Chartreuse de Parme by Cinzia TH Torrini (co-writer)

== See also ==
- Pallache family
