= The Sucker Punch =

1954 novel

- First edition
- Author: James Hadley Chase
- Language: English
- Genre: Thriller
- Publisher: Jarrolds
- Publication date: 1954
- Publication place: United Kingdom
- Media type: Print

The Sucker Punch is a 1954 thriller novel by the British writer James Hadley Chase, writing under the pen name Raymond Marshall. Set in Nice, France, an ambitious young man marries a wealthy woman he has no desire for, then plots to kill her for her money.

== Adaptation ==
In 1957 it was made into a French film A Kiss for a Killer directed by Henri Verneuil and starring Henri Vidal, Mylène Demongeot and Isa Miranda. The 1997 Indian thriller Aar Ya Paar also drew inspiration from the novel.

== Bibliography ==
- Goble, Alan. The Complete Index to Literary Sources in Film. Walter de Gruyter, 1999.
- Sharma, Dhiraj. The Sunday Tribune - Books. https://www.tribuneindia.com/2006/20060514/spectrum/book10.htm. Retrieved 15 May 2025.
