= Claudine Bouché =

French film editor (1925–2014)

- Born: 27 September 1925; France
- Died: 7 April 2014 (aged 88)
- Occupation: Film editor

Claudine Bouché (27 September 1925 – 7 April 2014) was a French film editor. She was known for her collaborations with noted French filmmakers Michel Boisrond, François Ozon, and especially François Truffaut. In 1977, Film Comment ranked her among the 75 top film editors.

== Career ==
She began her editing career on the 1951 comedy farce Mr. Peek-a-Boo for Jean Boyer. She went on to edit many of the films made by Michel Boisrond, most notably La Parisienne (1957) and Come Dance with Me! (1959), both starring Brigitte Bardot.

Bouché edited six films for French New Wave filmmaker François Truffaut, starting with the 1960 releases Shoot the Piano Player and The Army Game. Bouché and Truffaut again collaborated on the acclaimed, influential Jules and Jim and the short Antoine and Colette (part of the omnibus project Love at Twenty), both released in 1962. Bouché subsequently edited Truffaut's The Soft Skin (1964) and The Bride Wore Black (1968).

After a six-year hiatus, Bouché returned as editor of the popular 1974 softcore pornographic film Emmanuelle. She edited several more films in the 1970s and served as editorial associate on George Roy Hill's 1979 romantic comedy A Little Romance.

In the 1980s, she edited four films for French writer-director François Leterrier: Les babas cool (1981), Le voleur d'enfants (1981), Le garde du corps (1984) and Tranches de vie (1985). She also did uncredited work on Peter Sellers' final film, the 1980 comedy The Fiendish Plot of Dr. Fu Manchu and co-edited Paul Morrissey's 1985 drama Beethoven's Nephew.

More recently, Bouché was recruited by François Ozon to help edit his films Criminal Lovers (1999) and Water Drops on Burning Rocks (2000). She retired from editing after the latter film, though she received special thanks in the credits of the 2002 film The Truth About Charlie.

== Selected filmography ==
- It Happened in Aden (1956)
- Un soir sur la plage (1961)
- How to Succeed in Love (1962)
- The Adolescents (La Fleur de l'âge, ou Les adolescentes) - 1964
- Tranches de vie (1985)

== Personal life ==
Bouché was born in France on 27 September 1925. From 1937 through 1943, she attended the Collège de Jeunes Filles in Fontainebleau, France. In her later life, she lived in Paris.

She died on 7 April 2014 at the age of 88.
