= One Night on the Beach =

1961 film by Michel Boisrond

- Directed by: Michel Boisrond
- Written by: Annette Wademant (dialogue)
- Screenplay by: Michel Boisrond; Annette Wademant
- Produced by: Francis Cosne
- Starring: Martine Carol; Jean Desailly; Geneviève Grad; Daliah Lavi
- Cinematography: Léonce-Henri Burel
- Edited by: Claudine Bouché
- Music by: Paul Durand
- Color process: Black and white
- Production companies: Francos Films; Laetitia Film; Les Films; Mannic Films
- Distributed by: Cocinor
- Release date: 14 June 1961
- Running time: 85 minutes
- Countries: France; Italy
- Language: French

One Night on the Beach (French: Un soir sur la plage) is a 1961 French-Italian drama film directed by Michel Boisrond and starring Martine Carol, Jean Desailly, Geneviève Grad and Daliah Lavi.

== Plot ==
One night on the beach, Michel meets a beautiful stranger who gives herself to him. He finds out that she's a daughter of the property guardian in which he lives. The next morning the girl is found dead near the beach.

== Cast ==
- Martine Carol as Georgina
- Jean Desailly as Dr. Francis
- Geneviève Grad as Sylvie
- Daliah Lavi as Marie
- Henri-Jacques Huet as Michel Saint Hamand
- François Nocher as Oliver
- Gianni Garko as Heinrich
- Annibale Ninchi as Pépé
- Rellys as Le jardinier
- Michel Galabru as Le commissaire

== See also ==
- List of French films of 1961
