= 1957 in France =

- Decades: 1930s; 1940s; 1950s; 1960s; 1970s
- See also: History of France; Timeline of French history; List of years in France

Events from the year 1957 in France.

== Incumbents ==
- President: Rene Coty
- President of the Council of Ministers:
  - until 13 June: Guy Mollet
  - 13 June-6 November: Maurice Bourgès-Maunoury
  - starting 6 November: Félix Gaillard

== Events ==
- 4 February – France prohibits United Nation involvement in Algeria.
- 1 March – Sud Aviation forms from a merger between SNCASE (Société Nationale de Constructions Aéronautiques du Sud Est) and SNCASO (Société Nationale de Constructions Aéronautiques du Sud Ouest).
- 20 March – Newspaper L'Express reveals that the French army tortures Algerian prisoners.
- 25 March – Treaty of Rome, signed by France, West Germany, Italy, Belgium, the Netherlands and Luxembourg), establishes the European Economic Community (EEC).
- 26 May – Algerian politician killed by Algerian nationalists during soccer game
- First American writers of the Beat Generation (poets Allen Ginsberg and Peter Orlovsky) stay at the "Beat Hotel" (Hotel Rachou) in Paris.

== Sport ==
- 27 June – Tour de France begins.
- 20 July – Tour de France ends, won by Jacques Anquetil.

== Births ==
- 4 January – Joël Bats, international soccer player and coach
- 11 January – Alain Lemercier, racewalker
- 13 January – Bruno Baronchelli, soccer player
- 10 March – Mino Cinélu, musician
- 12 March – Patrick Battiston, international soccer player
- 3 April – Yves Chaland, cartoonist (died 1990)
- 25 May – Véronique Augereau, actress
- 12 June – Véronique Trillet-Lenoir, oncologist and politician (died 2023)
- 18 August – Carole Bouquet, actress
- 25 September – Jean-Pierre Demailly, mathematician (died 2022)
- 10 October
  - Didier Roustan, sports journalist (died 2024)
  - Jacques Verdier, sports journalist (died 2018)
- 12 October
  - Clémentine Célarié, actress
  - Rémi Laurent, actor (died 1989)
- 3 December – Valérie Quennessen, actress (died 1989)

== Deaths ==
- 14 May – Marie Vassilieff, Russian-born painter (born 1884)
- 23 October – Christian Dior, fashion designer (born 1905)
- 4 November – Joseph Canteloube, composer (born 1879)
- 6 December – Robert Esnault-Pelterie, pioneering aircraft designer (born 1881)

== See also ==
- 1957 in French television
- List of French films of 1957
