= Roger Pigaut =

French actor

- Born: 8 April 1919; Vincennes, France
- Died: 24 December 1989 (aged 70); Paris, France
- Occupations: Actor, film director
- Years active: 1943–1989

Roger Pigaut (birth name Roger Paul Louis Pigot) (8 April 1919 – 24 December 1989) was a French actor and film director. He appeared in 40 films between 1943 and 1980.

== Partial filmography ==
- Retour de flamme (1943) − Maurice
- Love Story (1943) − Fabien Marani
- Twilight (1944) − Petit rôle (uncredited)
- The Eleventh Hour Guest (1945) − Le docteur Rémi Lambert
- The Bellman (1945) − Pierre
- The Murderer is Not Guilty (1946) − Roger Pigaut (uncredited)
- The Sea Rose (1946) − Jérôme
- Night Warning (1946) − Pierre
- The Bouquinquant Brothers (1947) − Pierre Bouquinquant
- Antoine and Antoinette (1947) − Antoine Moulin
- Convicted (1948) − Le docteur Auburtin
- Night Express (1948) − Robert
- Bagarres (1948) − Antoine
- A Change in the Wind (1949) − Paul Chapus
- Cartouche, King of Paris (1950) − Louis Dominique Bourguignon dit Cartouche
- Un sourire dans la tempête (1950) − Francois Mercier
- La peau d'un homme (1951) − Bernard Landry
- The House on the Dune (1952) − Sylvain
- The Agony of the Eagles (1952) − Col. de Montander
- The Blonde Gypsy (1953) − Antoine
- The Count of Monte Cristo (1954) − Fernand de Morcerf
- Theodora, Slave Empress (1954) − Andres
- The Lovers of Manon Lescaut (1954) − Lescaut
- Napoléon (1955) − Le marquis de Caulaincourt
- The Light Across the Street (1955) − Pietri
- La plus belle des vies (1956) − Yves Carlier
- Konga Yo (1962) − Georges
- I Killed Rasputin (1967) − Pourichkevich
- Untamable Angelique (1967) − Le Marquis d'Escrainville
- Angelique and the Sultan (1968) − Le Marquis d'Escrainville
- Mayerling (1968) − Count Karolyi
- Catherine (1969) − Le Grand Connétable Garin
- Trois milliards sans ascenseur (1972, director)
- A Simple Story (1978) − Jérôme
