= Jacqueline Maillan =

French actress

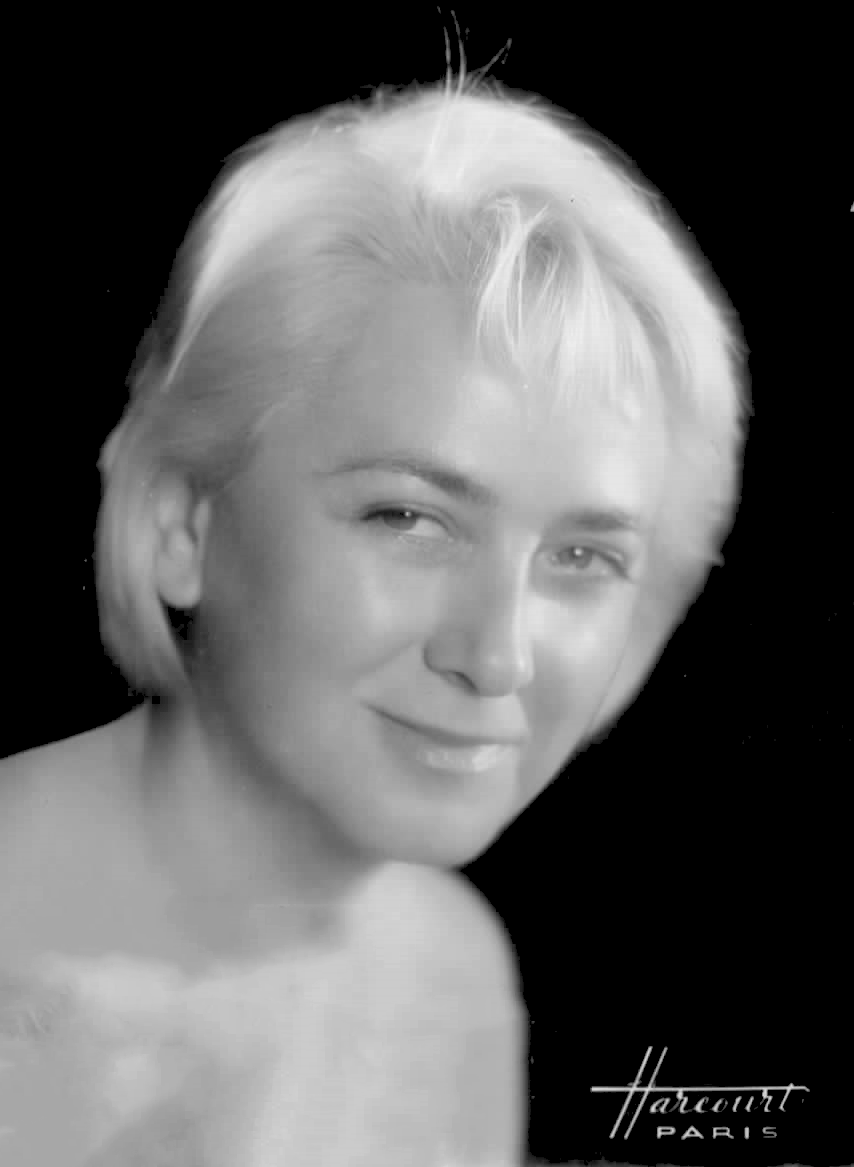
- Maillan in 1952
- Born: 11 January 1923; Paray-le-Monial, France
- Died: 12 May 1992 (aged 69); Paris, France
- Occupation: Actress
- Years active: 1947-1992

Jacqueline Jeanne Paule Maillan (11 January 1923 – 12 May 1992) was a French actress with a career spanning almost five decades, known primarily for her forty theatre productions, she also appeared in more than fifty films (1947 to 1992) and is remembered as one of the greatest comedic thespians of her generation and even nicknamed "The Louis de Funès in skirt". After working on the classics of French theatre, she excelled in playing exuberant, strong and powerful women in vaudeville and boulevard on stage or in such films as Jean-Marie Poiré's cult Gramps Is in the Resistance (French: Papy fait de la résistance, 1983) before pioneering stand-up in France. Her husband Michel Emer, who was Édith Piaf's composer, helped her hide her bisexuality (if not her sole homosexuality) from the public as they lived as a 'free couple' when it was then deeply stigmatized during the 1950s and 1960s. She was made a Chevalier (French: Knight) of the Légion d'honneur and Officer of the Ordre des Arts et des Lettres.

== Selected filmography ==
Year	Title	Role	Notes
1954	Les Intrigantes		
1954	Royal Affairs in Versailles		
1954	Ah! Les belles bacchantes		
1957	Burning Fuse		
1959	Archimède le clochard		
1962	How to Succeed in Love		
1962	Tartarin of Tarascon		
1963	Pouic-Pouic		
1963	Les Bricoleurs		
1964	How Do You Like My Sister?		
1983	Gramps Is in the Resistance		
