= Cent briques et des tuiles =

1965 film

- Directed by: Pierre Grimblat
- Starring: Jean-Claude Brialy
- Release date: 1965
- Country: France
- Language: French

Cent briques et des tuiles is a 1965 French film directed by Pierre Grimblat.

== Synopsis ==
Marcel, a small-time gangster, has lost all his gang's proceeds, 20 million francs, while gambling. His accomplices, the Shultz brothers, throw him out of his apartment and give him a week to come up with the money. Marcel goes to Champs Elysées, there crossing paths with his old friend Étienne, who proposes a robbery of the Galeries Lafayette store, telling Marcel it should net them 100 million francs. Étienne and Marcel (possibly a reference to Étienne Marcel) join forces with Justin, who disguises himself as Santa Claus. With the aid of the shop's lift boy, the heist is a success, but the banknotes are soaked in water, setting off the gang's troubles.

A group of young street criminals unsuccessfully trying to rob a neighbourhood shop run into Justin and take the money. At the end of a chain of bizarre events, Marcel's gang takes the money from the young criminals after the latter have a car accident. However, they're faced with a new problem: separating the bills which have dried up and stuck together like bricks. The gang tries to solve the problem by boiling them and drying again.

== Cast ==
- Jean-Claude Brialy as Marcel
- Marie Laforêt as Ida
- Sophie Daumier as Moune
- Jean-Pierre Marielle as Justin
- Michel Serrault as Méloune
- Albert Rémy as Etienne
- Pierre Clémenti as Raf
- Daniel Ceccaldi as Léon
- Robert Manuel as Palmoni
- Dominique Davray as Poulaine
- Renaud Verley as Charles
- Bernard Fresson as Policeman
- Paul Préboist as The Cousin
