= 1959 in French television =

This is a list of French television related events from 1959.

== Events ==
- 11 March – The 4th Eurovision Song Contest is held at the Palais des Festivals et des Congrès in Cannes. Netherlands wins the contest with the song "Een beetje" performed by Teddy Scholten.

== Television shows ==
=== Debuts ===
- Discorama
- Cinq colonnes à la une

=== 1940s ===
- Le Jour du Seigneur (1949–present)

=== 1950s ===
- A la découverte des Français
- Le Club du jeudi (1950–1961)
- Magazine féminin (1952–1970)
- Lectures pour tous (1953–1968)
- La Boîte à sel (1955–1960)
- La Piste aux étoiles (1956–1978)
- Voyage sans passeport (1957–1969)

== Networks and services ==
=== Launches ===
Network	Type	Launch date	Notes	Source

=== Conversions and rebrandings ===
Old network name	New network name	Type	Conversion Date	Notes	Source

=== Closures ===
Network	Type	Closure date	Notes	Source

== See also ==
- 1959 in France
- List of French films of 1959
