= People in Luck =

Les veinards
- Directed by: Philippe de Broca; Jean Girault
- Written by: Jacques Vilfrid; Jean Girault
- Produced by: Sirius-Film; Erdey
- Starring: France Anglade; Louis de Funès
- Cinematography: André Dumaître; Raymond Letouzey; Jean Penze
- Edited by: Armand Psenny
- Music by: Jean-Michel Defaye
- Distributed by: UGC-Sirius-CFDC (1962) (France) (theatrical)
- Release date: 26 April 1963 (France)
- Running time: 99 minutes
- Country: France
- Language: French

People in Luck (French title: Les veinards), is a 1963 French comedy film directed by Philippe de Broca and Jean Girault, written by Jacques Vilfrid and Jean Girault and starring France Anglade and Louis de Funès (uncredited). The film is known under the titles People in Luck or The Lucky (English), Die Glückspilze or Fünf Glückspilze (German) and I fortunati (Italian).

== Cast ==
- France Anglade as Corinne ("Le yacht" segment )
- Francis Blanche as Bricheton
- Blanchette Brunoy as Mrs Beaurepaire ("Un gros lot" segment)
- Daniel Ceccaldi as Gros nounours ("Le repas gastronomique" segment )
- Louis de Funès as Antoine Beaurepaire
- France Rumilly as Danielle Beaurepaire
- Noël Roquevert as Le bijoutier
- Max Montavon as Un vendeur de la bijouterie
- Jean Ozenne as Le réceptionniste de l'hôtel
- Robert Rollis as Le chauffeur de taxi
- Jack Ary as an agent
- René Hell as Un vendeur de journaux
- Nono Zammit as an agent
- Henri Lambert as Le « balafré »
- Jean-Claude Brialy as L'automobiliste
- Adrien Cayla-Legrand as A passerby
- André Chanu
- Jean-Lou Reynolds
- Philippe Dehesdin
- Pierre Tornade
- Michel Gonzalès
