= 1959 in France =

- Decades: 1930s; 1940s; 1950s; 1960s; 1970s
- See also: History of France; Timeline of French history; List of years in France

Events from the year 1959 in France.

== Incumbents ==
- President: Rene Coty (until 8 January), Charles de Gaulle (starting 8 January)
- Prime Minister: Charles de Gaulle (until 8 January), Michel Debré (starting 8 January)

== Events ==
- 8 January – Charles de Gaulle inaugurated as the first president of French Fifth Republic.
- 8 and 15 March – first French municipal elections under the French Fifth Republic
- 2 December – The Malpasset Dam collapses and floods the town of Fréjus, killing 412.

== Arts and literature ==
- 11 March – Eurovision Song Contest held in Cannes.
- 29 October – Astérix the Gaul makes a first appearance in the first regular issue of the comic magazine Pilote.

== Sport ==
- 25 June – 1959 Tour de France begins.
- 18 July – 1959 Tour de France ends, won by Federico Bahamontes of Spain, the first Spanish cyclist to win the Tour de France.

== Births ==
- 1 January – Michel Onfray, philosopher and author
- 7 February – Christine Angot, novelist and playwright
- 18 March – Luc Besson, film director, writer and producer
- 1 May – Yasmina Reza, playwright, actress, novelist and screenwriter
- 11 May – Didier Guillaume, politician (died 2025)
- 14 May – Patrick Bruel, singer and actor
- 28 May – Steve Jeltz, baseball player
- 19 June – Anne Hidalgo, Mayor of Paris
- 6 July – Richard Dacoury, basketball player
- 15 July – Vincent Lindon, actor and filmmaker
- 7 September – Pierre Nanterme, business executive (died 2019)
- 10 September – Philippe Pugnat, alpine skier
- 19 October – Marie-Luce Brasier-Clain, politician

== Deaths ==
- 21 January – Yves Le Febvre, writer and politician (born 1874)
- 17 April – Paul Dujardin, water polo player and Olympic medallist (born 1894)
- 5 May – Georges Grente, cardinal (born 1872)
- 14 May – Sidney Bechet, African American jazz saxophonist (born 1897)
- 15 May – Jeanne de Flandreysy, writer (born 1874)
- 2 June – Max Rousié, rugby league and rugby union footballer (born 1912)
- 22 June – Félix Guignot, physician (born 1882)
- 23 June – Boris Vian, writer, poet and musician (born 1920)
- 25 November
  - Jean Grémillon, film director (born 1901)
  - Gérard Philipe, actor (born 1922)

== See also ==
- 1959 in French television
- List of French films of 1959
