= Michèle Perrein =

French journalist and writer (1929–2010)

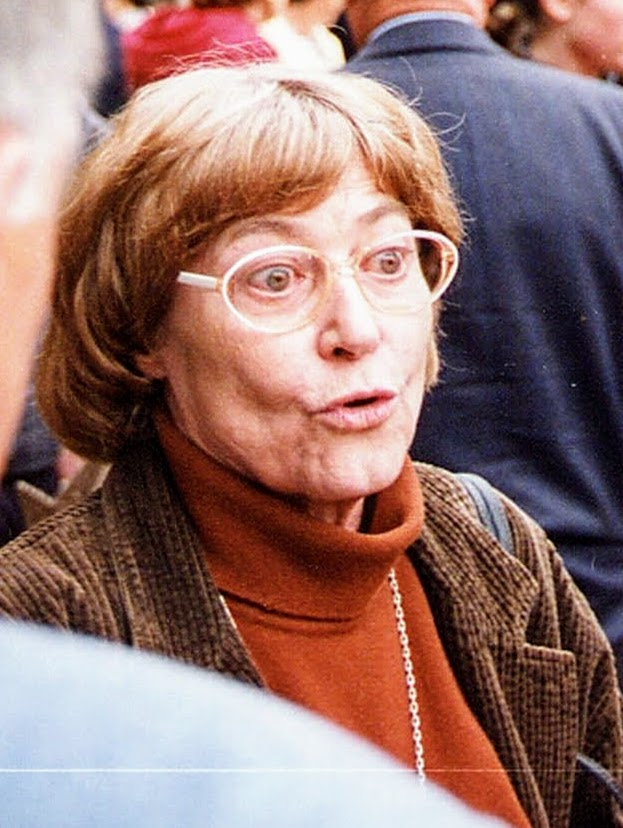
- Perrein in 2000
- Born: Michèle Barbe; 30 October 1929; Gironde, France
- Died: 13 February 2010 (aged 80); La Réole, France
- Occupations: Novelist; Journalist
- Spouse: Jacques Laurent

Michèle Perrein (30 October 1929 – 13 February 2010) was a French journalist and writer. She was the recipient of the Prix Interallié in 1984.

== Biography ==
Michèle Perrein, whose real surname was Barbe, was born in Gironde and studied at the Collège de La Réole, followed by two years at the Faculty of Law in Bordeaux. After she moved to Paris, she worked as a secretary by sending cars to South America while attending in parallel evening courses at the Centre de formation des journalistes.

Hélène Lazareff, director of the magazine Elle, found that her surname "Barbe" was difficult to wear, and thus she decided to take her mother's name "Perrein". Her work as a journalist led her to follow several trials, some of which she published articles about in Elle (Minou Drouet affair 1955) where she questioned the authenticity of Minou Drouet's works, or Paris Match (Patrick Henry affair).

Married to Jacques Laurent, with whom she maintained an indefectible friendship until his death, she divorced a few years later to follow her own way of novelist.

It was in her native Gironde that Michèle Perrein found inspiration for many of her literary works, including Le Buveur de Garonne and Les Cotonniers de Bassalane which are the best known, and recognized. As a dramatist, she had her play L'Hôtel racine, presented at the Comédie des Champs-Élysées. She was also co-author of the screenplay and dialogues of Henri-Georges Clouzot's film, The Truth. She also produced reports, surveys, interviews or chronicles for Combat, Elle, Arts et Spectacles, Votre beauté and wrote some articles for Paris Match, Marie Claire, F Magazine.

After the sudden death of her companion Michel Adam, called Adam Thalamy (with whom she co-wrote Ave Caesar in 1982), she ceased her activity as novelist and retired to the city of her childhood, where she was carried away by Alzheimer's disease.

== Work ==
Novels

- 1956: La Sensitive, Éditions Julliard, Prix des quatre Jurys 1957
- 1957: Le Soleil dans l’œil, Julliard, adapted to cinema under the title Sun in Your Eyes directed by Jacques Bourdon, starring Anna Karina
- 1960: Barbastre, Julliard
- 1961: La Flemme, Julliard
- 1962: Le Cercle, Julliard
- 1965: Le Petit Jules, Juliard
- 1970: M'oiselle S., Julliard
- 1970: La Chineuse, Julliard, Grand prix des lectrices de Elle
- 1971: La Partie de plaisir, Flammarion
- 1973: Le Buveur de Garonne, Flammarion, Prix des libraires 1974
- 1975: Le Mâle aimant, Julliard
- 1976: Gemma Lapidaire, Flammarion
- 1978: Entre chienne et louve, Éditions Grasset
- 1980: Comme une fourmi cavalière, Grasset
- 1982: Ave Caesar - rencontre avec Adam Thalamy, Grasset, Grand prix de littérature de la ville de Bordeaux, 1982
- 1984: La Sensitive ou l'innocence coupable, Grasset
- 1984: Les Cotonniers de Bassalane, Grasset, Prix Interallié 1984.
- 1989: La Margagne, Grasset

Plays

- 1966: L'Hôtel Racine jouée à la Comédie des Champs élysées
- 1968: Un samedi, deux femmes
