= Mon Curé Chez les Nudistes =

1982 film by Robert Thomas

Mon curé chez les nudistes
- Directed by: Robert Thomas
- Written by: Robert Thomas
- Produced by: Marcel Albertini
- Starring: Paul Préboist; Georges Descrières
- Cinematography: Claude Bécognée
- Edited by: Jacqueline Thiédot
- Music by: Romuald
- Production companies: Imp.Ex.Ci.; Naja Films
- Release dates: 28 July 1982 (France); 1983 (Norway)
- Running time: 90 minutes
- Country: France
- Language: French

Mon curé chez les nudistes is a French sex comedy from 1982 directed by Robert Thomas. The main role is played by Paul Préboist.

== Plot ==
French comedy about a local priest with a good mood who is sent to teach morals at a nudist colony with hilarious consequences.

== Cast ==
- Paul Préboist ... Priest Daniel
- Georges Descrières ... Monseigneur
- Henri Génès ... Truffard
- Philippe Nicaud ... Léon
- Katia Tchenko ... Gladys
- Jean-Marc Thibault ... Antoine
- Ramiro Olivera ... Alex - Antoine's son
- Brigitte Auber ... Charlotte - Antoine's wife
- Marc de Jonge ... Oscar, the hairdresser
