= Arsène Lupin (TV series) =

French television show

- Also known as: Arsenio Lupin (Italy)
- Genre: Crime
- Created by: Jacques Nahum
- Starring: Georges Descrières; Yvon Bouchard; Roger Carel; Marthe Keller
- Theme music composer: Jean-Pierre Bourtayre
- Countries of origin: France; West Germany; Belgium; Italy; Switzerland; Austria; Netherlands; Canada
- Original languages: French; Russian
- No. of series: 2
- No. of episodes: 26

Production
- Producer: Jacques Nahum
- Running time: 55

Original release
- Network: ORTF
- Release: March 18, 1971 – February 16, 1974

Arsène Lupin is a French crime television show which was co-produced with French, German, Canadian, Belgian, Dutch, Swiss, Italian and Austrian television stations. It is loosely based on the novels by Maurice Leblanc featuring master thief Arsène Lupin who was featured in seventeen novels and thirty-nine short stories.

== Development ==
Georges Descrières' portrayal of Arsène Lupin showed more similarity to Graf Yoster than to Maurice Leblanc's original depiction of his character. He behaved in the first place as a perfect gentleman who never got angry. Besides rescuing damsels in distress, Lupin took on (other) criminals, competing with their wit and intelligence. Either he stole paintings from rich people who had to be considered white-collar criminals, or he acted as a detective who derailed criminal schemes. Among the guest stars were German actors such as Günter Strack and Sky du Mont.

Jean-Paul Salomé said in his commentary on the DVD version of his film, film Arsène Lupin (2004), that he had liked this television series as a child.

German television, one of the investors, would broadcast the show eventually between 18:00-20:00 o'clock because it was only allowed to show commercials within that timeslot. For them to get a financial return on investment, the show had to be appropriate for families and also for children who would watch it alone. Subsequently, it was nearby to ask to defuse and flatten some of Leblanc's plots in order to avoid possible complaints that could force the station to broadcast the show beyond the "Vorabendprogramm".

== Cast ==
- Georges Descrières ... Arsène Lupin
- Yvon Bouchard ... Grognard
- Roger Carel ... Guerchard
- Henri Virlojeux ... Herlock Sholmès

== Theme songs ==
The series 1 and series 2 ending themes, "L'Arsène" and "Gentleman Cambrioleur", were performed by Jacques Dutronc, with music by Jean-Pierre Bourtayre and lyrics by Jacques Lanzmann.
