= Untamable Angelique =

1967 film

- French film poster
- Directed by: Bernard Borderie
- Written by: Bernard Borderie; Pascal Jardin; Francis Cosne
- Dialogue by: Pascal Jardin
- Based on: Angelique and the Sultan by Anne and Serge Golon
- Produced by: Francis Cosne; François Chavane
- Starring: Michèle Mercier; Robert Hossein; Roger Pigaut; Bruno Dietrich; Christian Rode
- Cinematography: Henri Persin
- Edited by: Christian Gaudin
- Music by: Michel Magne
- Production companies: Compagnie Industrielle et Commerciale Cinématographique Films Borderie; Francos Films; Cinéphonic; Gloria Film; Fono Roma
- Distributed by: S.N. Prodis (France); Gloria Film (West Germany); Euro International Films (Italy)
- Release date: 27 October 1967
- Running time: 95 minutes
- Countries: France; West Germany; Italy
- Language: French
- Box office: 29.4 million tickets

Untamable Angelique (French: Indomptable Angélique) is a 1967 historical adventure film directed by Bernard Borderie and starring Michèle Mercier, Robert Hossein and Roger Pigaut. It was made as a co-production between France, Italy and West Germany. It was the fourth in the five film series based on the novels by Anne and Serge Golon.

The film's sets were designed by the art director Robert Giordani. It was shot at Cinecittà Studios in Rome.

== Synopsis ==
After discovering that her first husband is still alive, Angélique travels to the South of France not knowing that he is now a notorious pirate. Captured by some slave traders she is taken to Crete where she is intended to be sold.

== Main cast ==
- Michèle Mercier as Angélique de Peyrac
- Robert Hossein as Jeoffrey de Peyrac
- Roger Pigaut as Le Marquis d'Escrainville
- Christian Rode as Le Duc de Vivonne
- Ettore Manni as Jason
- Bruno Dietrich as Coriano
- Pasquale Martino as Savary
- Sieghardt Rupp as Millerand
- Poldo Bendandi as Angélique's buyer

== Production ==
Michèle Mercier revealed that she got hurt during the gang rape scene: "Angelica is thrown into the hold where four prisoners are. They were inexperienced extras. They really rushed on me. I was terrified, I screamed. One of them hit me hard on the chest with his chain. For two years I had a lump in my breast. It was horrible!"

== Box office ==
The film sold 4,610,585 tickets in France and Germany. It also sold 24.8 million tickets in the Soviet Union, for a worldwide total of 29,410,585 ticket sales.

== Bibliography ==
- Bergfelder, Tim. International Adventures: German Popular Cinema and European Co-Productions in the 1960s. Berghahn Books, 2005.
- Klossner, Michael. The Europe of 1500-1815 on Film and Television: A Worldwide Filmography of Over 2550 Works, 1895 Through 2000. McFarland & Company, 2002.
