= Montmartre (1941 film) =

- Directed by: Georges Lacombe
- Written by: André Cayatte; Georges Lacombe; Serge Veber
- Starring: Édith Piaf; Jean-Louis Barrault; Roger Duchesne
- Cinematography: Nicolas Hayer
- Music by: Marguerite Monnot
- Production company: Société Universelle de Films
- Distributed by: Les Films Vog
- Release date: 19 November 1941
- Running time: 110 minutes
- Country: France
- Language: French

Montmartre (French: Montmartre sur Seine) is a 1941 French romantic comedy film directed by Georges Lacombe and starring Édith Piaf, Jean-Louis Barrault and Roger Duchesne.

The film's sets were designed by the art director Robert Dumesnil.

== Main cast ==
- Édith Piaf as Lily
- Jean-Louis Barrault as Michel Courtin
- Roger Duchesne as Claude
- René Bergeron as Henri Lemaire
- Huguette Faget as Juliette
- Henri Vidal as Maurice Cazaux
- Solange Sicard as Une invitée de Mousette
- Champi as Monsieur Martin
- Pierre Labry as Le cafetier
- Gaston Modot as Le maître d'hôtel
- Léonce Corne as Le père de Lily
- Paul Demange as Le commissaire
- Odette Barencey as La marchande des quatre saisons
- Sylvie as Madame Courtin
- Denise Grey as Moussette
- Paul Meurisse as Paul Mariol

== Bibliography ==
- Rège, Philippe. Encyclopedia of French Film Directors, Volume 1. Scarecrow Press, 2009.
