= The Parisian (film) =

1957 film by Michel Boisrond

- French theatrical release poster
- French: Une Parisienne
- Directed by: Michel Boisrond
- Screenplay by: Annette Wademant; Jean Aurel
- Adaptation by: Jacques Emmanuel; Jean Aurel; Michel Boisrond
- Dialogue by: Annette Wademant
- Produced by: Francis Cosne
- Starring: Charles Boyer; Henri Vidal; Brigitte Bardot; Noël Roquevert; Madeleine Lebeau; Claire Maurier; Fernand Sardou; Guy Tréjan; Nadia Gray; André Luguet
- Cinematography: Marcel Grignon
- Edited by: Claudine Bouché
- Music by: Henri Crolla; Hubert Rostaing; André Hodeir
- Production companies: Les Films Ariane; Filmsonor; Cinétel; Rizzoli Film
- Distributed by: Cinédis (France); Cineriz (Italy)
- Release date: 16 December 1957 (France)
- Running time: 85 minutes
- Countries: France; Italy
- Language: French
- Budget: $500,000
- Box office: $8 million (US and Canada) or $2 million rentals

The Parisian (French: Une Parisienne) is a 1957 comedy film directed by Michel Boisrond and starring Charles Boyer, Henri Vidal and Brigitte Bardot. Bardot plays the daughter of the French President who marries her father's secretary, but the couple become jealous of each other's purported sexual flings. Costumes are by Pierre Balmain.

== Plot ==
Brigitte Laurier, daughter of the President of France, is in love with Michel Legrand, her father's womanizing chief of staff. However, he repeatedly rejects Brigitte's sexual advances, so she appoints herself to an internship as his secretary. She later tricks Michel into delivering papers to the President, who is spending the weekend in the countryside. Michel's former mistress, Caroline d'Herblay, and her politician husband are also there, and she insists that Michel stay the weekend.

Michel and Caroline reunite secretly in the woods. As she slips out of her room later that night to be with Michel, her suspecting husband follows her. Meanwhile, Brigitte heads to Michel's room, surprises him and announces she wants to be his mistress, promising never to speak of marriage. They kiss, but Caroline walks in on them. A jealous Mr. d'Herblay wakes up everyone in the house—i.e., the Cabinet of France—as they investigate who is in Michel's room. While Caroline hides, Brigitte is revealed to be in Michel's bed in front of everyone, embarrassing the President. To avoid a scandal, Michel and Brigitte are forced to be married by her father. However, Brigitte is sure Michel will eventually cheat on her.

Prince Charles later starts his state visit to France. While preparing to go to the gala ball, Mrs. Wilson, another one of Michel's previous mistresses, calls Michel—unaware that he is now married—and Brigitte picks up. Certain that Michel is having an affair with Mrs. Wilson, Brigitte confronts him at the ball. Michel laughs it off, but in a fit of jealously, Brigitte declares she will cheat on him with the next man to walk through the door. Michel laughs and bids her good luck as Charles is that person. Undeterred, she starts flirting with Charles. Becoming jealous, Michel slaps Brigitte in public and takes her home.

The next morning, Mrs. Wilson calls again. Brigitte answers and sets up lunch for Mrs. Wilson and Michel for that afternoon. Mrs. Wilson arrives, still infatuated with Michel, and kisses him as Brigitte watches. Brigitte poses as a maid, but is surly as she serves Mrs. Wilson. Michel's office calls and Brigitte picks up. She pretends to be having a phone conversation with Charles and later tells Michel that she is going to the embassy to meet him. Meanwhile, Mrs. Wilson storms off after learning that Brigitte is Michel's wife. As the women leave, Michel's office calls back, and he realises Brigitte lied about having a date with Charles.

However, Brigitte does go to the embassy and meets Charles, who cancels his plan to open a nursery with the Queen and instead spends the afternoon with Brigitte. He offers to fly her in a new fighter jet to have tea with the Queen of England, and Brigitte accepts. At the airport, Brigitte calls Michel to brag that she is flying with Charles, but Michel does not believe her. As they fly off, Charles decides not to go to London, but instead fly to Nice and go for a swim. After swimming, Charles and Brigitte go to a restaurant, where he is mistaken for a rowdy local. The other locals stop them from leaving and a fight breaks out until they realise he is actually the Prince.

Meanwhile, the President and Michel realise Charles actually did leave with Brigitte and is not sick with a migraine as is told to the press. Michel becomes enraged with jealously and goes to see Charles to prove he is not sick. However, the Queen stalls him until Charles returns, acting sick. Michel apologises for his apparent mistake.

Later, when Brigitte tells Michel she went to Nice with Charles, he does not believe her. They promise to always tell each other the truth, but when Brigitte again says she was with Charles, Michel still does not believe her. Ultimately, Brigitte tells him she was at the cinema with a friend and crosses her fingers behind her back.

== Cast ==
- Charles Boyer as Prince Charles
- Henri Vidal as Michel Legrand
- Brigitte Bardot as Brigitte Laurier
- Noël Roquevert as Colonel Albert d'Herblay
- Madeleine Lebeau as Monique Wilson
- Fernand Sardou as Fernand
- Claire Maurier as Caroline d'Herblay
- Robert Pizani as Ambassador Mouchkine
- Guy Tréjan as Colonel Morin
- Judith Magre as Irma
- Harry-Max as the foreign ambassador
- Marcel Charvey as a bad guy
- Vera Talchi as Titine
- Marcel Pérès as the general
- Henri Cogan as a brawler
- Hubert de Lapparent as the president's bailiff
- Nadia Gray as Queen Greta
- André Luguet as Alcide Laurier

== Reception ==
Variety called the film "a light, saucy comedy."

United Artists acquired U.S. distribution rights to the film for $550,000, marking a record-setting agreement for a foreign film in the United States. The film went on to achieve tremendous success worldwide, earning $3 million in profits outside the United States for producer Raoul Lévy.
