= Come Dance with Me! (1959 film) =

1959 film by Michel Boisrond

- French theatrical release poster
- French: Voulez-vous danser avec moi ?
- Directed by: Michel Boisrond
- Adaptation by: Gérard Oury; Jean-Charles Tacchella; Louis C. Thomas; Michel Boisrond; Annette Wademant; Francis Cosne
- Dialogue by: Annette Wademant
- Based on: The Blonde Died Dancing by Kelley Roos
- Produced by: Francis Cosne
- Starring: Brigitte Bardot; Henri Vidal; Dawn Addams; Darío Moreno; Georges Descrières; Serge Gainsbourg; François Chaumette; Pascal Mazzotti; Paul Frankeur; Noël Roquevert; Philippe Nicaud
- Cinematography: Robert Lefebvre
- Edited by: Claudine Bouché
- Music by: Henri Crolla; André Hodeir
- Production companies: Francos Films; Vidès Cinematografica
- Distributed by: Sofradis (France); Titanus (Italy)
- Release date: 18 December 1959 (France)
- Running time: 91 minutes
- Countries: France; Italy
- Language: French

Come Dance with Me! (French: Voulez-vous danser avec moi ?, lit. 'Do You Want to Dance with Me?'), released in Italy as Sexy Girl, is a 1959 comedy mystery film directed by Michel Boisrond and starring Brigitte Bardot and Henri Vidal. The film is based on the 1956 novel The Blonde Died Dancing by American author couple writing as Kelley Roos.

== Plot ==
Against the wishes of her wealthy industrialist father, Albert Decauville-Lachenée, young Virginie marries dentist Hervé Dandieu. Three months into their marriage, Virginie and Hervé constantly bicker, and following an argument, he leaves the house for a drink at a nightclub. There, he is seduced by Anita Florès, a red-haired dance instructor who takes him home. Unbeknownst to him, Anita is a scam artist who has sent her lover Léon to photograph her in the company of Hervé. Although Hervé eventually decides to stay faithful to his wife, Léon is able to take some pictures of their intimate moments.

Hervé rebuffs Anita's attempts to blackmail him until she calls him one night, telling him to meet her the next day. Virginie and Albert overhear the conversation, after which Virginie assumes that her husband is having an affair. The following day, she follows him to Anita's dance studio, and when looking through the keyhole, she spots Anita's murdered body next to Hervé, who is holding a gun. Hervé convinces Virginie that he is not guilty and they flee the scene through the back door, although they are noticed by some of the staff members. To prove her husband's innocence, Virginie charms Anita's husband Mr. Florès into hiring her as a dance teacher in order to find more information.

Going through the studio, Virginie overhears a conversation between Mr. Florès and his mistress Daisy, who plot to mislead Inspector Marchal by sending him an anonymous letter. Virginie intercepts the letter, which says, "The murderer is Gérard Lalemand". She attempts to warn Inspector Marchal, who does not believe her, so she contacts Gérard herself. Virginie talks to him over the phone and arranges a meeting at a bar. When Gérard fails to show up, Virginie locates his residence, where the housekeeper tells her that Mr. Lalemand has been dead for three years. Virginie realizes that she has been talking to Mr. Lalemand's son, who is the same charming man whom she met earlier at the studio.

Posing as Inspector Marchal's deputy, Hervé calls Mr. Florès and questions him about the anonymous letter. Despite confessing that he gave a false statement, Mr. Florès claims not to know Gérard before hanging up on Hervé. When arrested for blackmailing Hervé, Léon admits that he is the mysterious person who fled the studio through the roof on the night of the murder, but claims that it was Hervé who killed Anita. To Hervé's surprise, Albert uses a trick to prove Hervé's innocence to the detectives: He claims that a witness saw the murder, whereupon Herve bursts into joy, suggesting to the hidden detectives that he did not commit the murder.

Virginie believes that she has tracked Gérard down to a gay nightclub where he is performing as a singing cross-dresser under the alias Danielle. Upon confronting him, she realizes that the man is not Gérard, but her fellow dance teacher Daniel. Virginie then returns to Gérard's residence, where he tells her that Anita was his father's mistress and that she stood to profit from Gérard's F50 million inheritance while she was still alive.

The police discover that it was Gérard who sent his lover Daniel to kill Anita so he could inherit the F50 million, and both men are arrested. Inspector Marchal explains to Virginie that Daniel tried to frame Hervé for the murder after witnessing him arguing with Anita. Hervé is proven innocent, and he kisses Virginie.

== Cast ==
- Brigitte Bardot as Virginie Dandieu
- Henri Vidal as Hervé Dandieu
- Dawn Addams as Anita Florès
- Darío Moreno as Mr. Florès
- Georges Descrières as Gérard Lalemand
- Serge Gainsbourg as Léon
- Joyce Johnson as Daisy
- Maria Pacôme as Madame Decauville-Lachenée
- François Chaumette as Joseph
- Pascal Mazzotti as the barman
- Magdeleine Bérubet as Clémence, Gérard's housekeeper
- Paul Frankeur as Inspector Marchal
- Noël Roquevert as Albert Decauville-Lachenée
- Philippe Nicaud as Daniel

== Production ==
Unlike her earlier films, for which she received a notably lesser salary, Bardot demanded $200,000 plus a percentage of the profits. Sylvia Lopez was originally cast as Anita Florès, but terminal leukemia prevented her from finishing the film. She withdrew after a few days of shooting and was replaced by Dawn Addams.

Principal photography took place from 9 July to 2 October 1959 at the Victorine Studios in Nice. The film's sets were designed by the art director Jean André.

== Reception ==
The film generated a profit of $2 million for Lévy, a dissatisfactory amount compared to Bardot's earlier films. The box-office underperformance prompted Raoul Lévy, the producer who elevated Bardot to stardom, to cease his collaboration with the actress.
