= The Lonely Woman =

1973 film by Francisco Rovira Beleta

- Spanish theatrical release poster
- Spanish: No encontré rosas para mi madre
- Directed by: Francisco Rovira Beleta
- Screenplay by: Paul Andréota
- Based on: No encontré rosas para mi madre by José Antonio García Blázquez
- Starring: Gina Lollobrigida; Danielle Darrieux; Conchita Velasco; Susan Hampshire; Renaud Verley
- Cinematography: Michel Kelber
- Edited by: Gianfranco Amicucci; Mercedes Alonso
- Music by: Piero Piccioni
- Production companies: Hidalgo S.A.; Les Productions du Bassan; C.P. Cinematografica
- Distributed by: Regia-Arturo González Rodríguez (Spain); CFDC (France); Intercinema Distribuzione (Italy)
- Release dates: 11 March 1973 (Spain); 31 July 1974 (France); 26 September 1974 (Italy)
- Running time: 93 minutes
- Countries: Spain; France; Italy
- Language: Spanish

The Lonely Woman (Spanish: No encontré rosas para mi madre, lit. 'I Didn't Find Roses for My Mother'; French: Roses rouges et Piments verts, lit. 'Red Roses and Green Peppers'; Italian: Peccato mortale, lit. 'Mortal Sin') is a 1973 drama film directed by Francisco Rovira Beleta and starring Gina Lollobrigida, Danielle Darrieux, Conchita Velasco, Susan Hampshire and Renaud Verley. It is an adaptation of the 1968 novel No encontré rosas para mi madre by José Antonio García Blázquez.

== Plot ==
Teresa hopes that her social ambitions will be fulfilled by her son Jacy. When he finds out that his mother is starting to see a man, he decides to leave home and embark on a multitude of short relationships with different women. He ends up marrying a mentally challenged but incredibly rich woman. Meanwhile, Teresa discovers her love and happiness with a school teacher.

== Cast ==
- Gina Lollobrigida as Netty
- Danielle Darrieux as Teresa
- Conchita Velasco as Africa
- Susan Hampshire as Elaine
- Renaud Verley as Jacy
- Maribel Martín as Marian
- Javier Loyola
- Eduardo Fajardo as lawyer
- Giacomo Rossi Stuart as Richard Leighton
