= 1957 in French television =

This is a list of French television related events from 1957.

== Debuts ==
- 24 January – Voyage sans passeport (1957–1969)
- A la découverte des Français

== Television shows ==
=== 1940s ===
- Le Jour du Seigneur (1949–present)

=== 1950s ===
- Le Club du jeudi (1950–1961)
- Magazine féminin (1952–1970)
- Lectures pour tous (1953–1968)
- La Boîte à sel (1955–1960)

== Births ==
- 9 April – André Manoukian, jazz pianist, actor & TV personality
- 19 April – Bernard Montiel, TV presenter & actor
- 7 May – Véronique Jannot, actress & singer

== See also ==
- 1957 in France
- List of French films of 1957
