= The Girl from the Red Cabaret =

- Directed by: Eugenio Martín
- Written by: Santiago Moncada
- Produced by: José Frade
- Starring: Marisol; Renaud Verley; Mel Ferrer
- Cinematography: Fernando Arribas
- Edited by: José Antonio Rojo
- Music by: Gregorio García Segura; Tony Hatch; Jackie Trent
- Production company: José Frade Producciones Cinematográficas
- Distributed by: Atlántida Films
- Release date: 22 December 1973
- Running time: 91 minutes
- Country: Spain
- Language: Spanish

The Girl from the Red Cabaret (Spanish: La chica del Molino Rojo) is a 1973 Spanish musical drama film directed by Eugenio Martín and starring Marisol, Renaud Verley and Mel Ferrer.

The film's sets were designed by the art director Gil Parrondo.

== Plot ==
Dalton Harvey (Mel Ferrer) is a man who has managed to amass a considerable fortune through gambling. He has become obsessed with a rival player, Larry Elliot (Renaud Verley), a womanizer, who takes on different identities and goes from city to city and from country to country seducing women and then abandoning them. Larry has seduced Dalton's wife, only to leave her, causing her to commit suicide.

Dalton comes up with a plot for revenge, investigating all of Larry's mistresses to find a woman that can seduce him and bring Larry to Dalton so that he can settle the score. He finds Maria (Marisol), a cabaret singer who works at the Moulin Rouge, but doesn't count on falling for her himself.

== Cast ==
- Marisol as María Marcos
- Renaud Verley as Larry Elliot
- Mel Ferrer as Dalton Harvey
- Silvia Tortosa as Gina
- Mirta Miller as Rosita
- Manuel de Blas as Malcolm Higgins
- Bárbara Rey as Grace
- Nene Morales
- Norma Kastel as Martine
- Eduardo Calvo as Gerente del Molino Rojo
- Sofía Casares as Corista
- Ketty de la Cámara
- Víctor Israel as Abogado
- Mabel Escaño
- Vicente Roca
- Lucy Tiller
- Ángel Martín

== Bibliography ==
- Mira, Alberto. Historical Dictionary of Spanish Cinema. Scarecrow Press, 2010.
