= Attack of the Normans =

1962 film

- Directed by: Giuseppe Vari
- Screenplay by: Nino Stresa
- Starring: Cameron Mitchell; Geneviève Grad; Ettore Manni; Philippe Hersent
- Cinematography: Marco Scarpelli; Vittorio Storaro
- Production companies: Galatea Film; Lyre Film
- Release date: 19 October 1962 (Europe)
- Running time: 89 minutes
- Countries: Italy; France

Attack of the Normans (Italian: I normanni) is a 1962 Italian film set in England in the early 9th century. Viking incursions play a central role in the plot; "Normans" in the title is used in its original continental sense, meaning Viking.

This film was written by Nino Stresa and directed by Giuseppe Vari.

== Cast ==
- Cameron Mitchell as Wilfred, Duke of Saxony
- Geneviève Grad as Svetania
- Ettore Manni as Olivier D'Anglon
- Philippe Hersent as James
- Piero Lulli as Barton"
- Paul Müller as Thomas
- Franca Bettoia as Queen Patricia

== Release ==
Attack of the Normans was released theatrically in Europe 19 October 1962. On its release in the United States in 1963, the film was cut to 79 minutes.

== See also ==
- List of historical drama films
