= Convicted (1948 film) =

1948 film

- Directed by: Georges Lacombe
- Written by: Marc-Gilbert Sauvajon; Solange Térac
- Produced by: Francis Cosne; Georges Dancigers; Antoine de Rouvre; Lucien Masson; Alexandre Mnouchkine
- Starring: Yvonne Printemps; Pierre Fresnay; Roger Pigaut
- Cinematography: Jacques Lemare
- Edited by: Raymond Leboursier
- Music by: René Cloërec
- Production company: Les Films Ariane
- Distributed by: La Société des Films Sirius
- Release date: 14 April 1948
- Running time: 100 minutes
- Country: France
- Language: French

Convicted (French: Les condamnés) is a 1948 French drama film directed by Georges Lacombe and starring Yvonne Printemps, Pierre Fresnay and Roger Pigaut. It has been described as a film noir. It was shot at the Epinay Studios of Eclair outside Paris. The film's sets were designed by the art director Emile Alex.

== Cast ==
- Yvonne Printemps as Hélène Séverac
- Pierre Fresnay as Jean Séverac
- Roger Pigaut as Le docteur Auburtin
- Jacques Castelot as Le docteur Yvarne
- Charles Vissières as Le docteur Jacquier
- Odette Barencey as Jeanne
- Guy Favières as Le colonel
- Charles Lemontier as Lebourgeon
- Christiane Delacroix as La bonne
- Marguerite Pierry as Tante Marthe

== Bibliography ==
- Rège, Philippe. Encyclopedia of French Film Directors, Volume 1. Scarecrow Press, 2009.
- Walker-Morrison, Deborah. Classic French Noir: Gender and the Cinema of Fatal Desire. Bloomsbury Publishing, 2020.
