= Georges Lacombe (director) =

French film director

Georges Lacombe (19 August 1902 – 14 April 1990) was a French film director.

== Filmography ==
- La Zone (1928, short)
- Boule de gomme (1931)
- That Scoundrel Morin (1932)
- A Telephone Call (1932)
- The Invisible Woman (1933)
- Un jour d'été (1933)
- Youth (1934)
- The Scandalous Couple (1935)
- The Happy Road (1936)
- The Heart Disposes (1936)
- Café de Paris (1938)
- Behind the Facade (1939)
- Musicians of the Sky (1939)
- Paris-New York (1940)
- They Were Twelve Women (1940)
- The Last of the Six (1941)
- Montmartre-sur-Seine (1941)
- The Newspaper Falls at Five O'Clock (1942)
- Monsieur La Souris (1942)
- The Stairs Without End (1943)
- Florence Is Crazy (1944)
- Land Without Stars (1946)
- Martin Roumagnac (1946)
- Convicted (1948)
- Prelude to Glory (1950)
- The Night Is My Kingdom (1951)
- Les Sept Péchés capitaux, segment Le Huitième péché (1952)
- The Call of Destiny (1953)
- Their Last Night (1953)
- La Lumière d'en face (1955)
- White Cargo (1958)
- My Darned Father (1958)
