= Le Saint mène la danse =

1960 French film by Jacques Nahum

- Directed by: Jacques Nahum
- Written by: Leslie Charteris; Albert Simonin; Jacques Nahum; Yvan Audouard
- Based on: character created by Leslie Charteris
- Produced by: René Gaston Vuattoux
- Starring: Felix Marten; Michèle Mercier; Françoise Brion
- Cinematography: Roger Hubert
- Music by: Paul Durand
- Production companies: Les Films du Cyclope; Lux Film
- Release date: 1960
- Running time: 89 minutes
- Country: France
- Language: French

Le Saint mène la danse (The Saint leads the Dance) also known as The Dance of Death and Le Saint conduit le bal (The Saint leads the Ball) is a 1960 film featuring Félix Marten as Simon Templar, the crimefighter also known as The Saint.

== Plot ==
The Saint is in New York and helps in the arrest of a gangster, but a year later in Paris the gangster's friends try to get revenge.

== Cast ==
- Felix Marten as Simon Templar
- Michèle Mercier as Dany
- Françoise Brion as Norma
- Jean Desailly as Freddie Pellman
- Nicole Mirel as Gina
- Henri Nassiet as Louis
- Clément Harari as Archie
- Jean-Marie Rivière as Mario

== Production ==
This is a crime comedy directed by Jacques Nahum.
