= A Kiss for a Killer =

1957 film

- Directed by: Henri Verneuil
- Written by: Henri Verneuil (adaptation); Annette Wademant (adaptation); François Boyer (adaptation); François Boyer (dialogue); Annette Wadette (dialogue)
- Based on: The Sucker Punch by James Hadley Chase
- Produced by: Michel Safra
- Starring: Henri Vidal; Mylène Demongeot; Isa Miranda
- Cinematography: Christian Matras
- Edited by: Louisette Hautecoeur
- Music by: Paul Durand
- Color process: Black and white
- Production company: Spéva Films
- Distributed by: Cinédis
- Release date: 27 November 1957
- Running time: 102 minutes
- Country: France
- Language: French

A Kiss for a Killer (French: Une manche et la belle) is a 1957 French drama mystery film directed by Henri Verneuil and starring Henri Vidal, Mylène Demongeot and Isa Miranda. It is based on the 1954 novel The Sucker Punch by James Hadley Chase.

It was shot at the Victorine Studios in Nice. The film's sets were designed by the art director Jean d'Eaubonne.

== Plot ==
A wealthy widow living in Nice marries an attractive but self-centred young man. Soon after the wedding he meets and falls in love with her niece Eva, whose calculating ambitions lead her to push him to murder her aunt.

== Cast ==
- Henri Vidal as Philippe Delaroche
- Mylène Demongeot as Eva Dollan
- Isa Miranda as Stella Farnwell
- Jean-Loup Philippe as Bob Farnwell (as Jean-Lou Philippe)
- Simone Bach as Sylvette Guibert
- Antonin Berval as Le maire
- Jean Galland as Bank manager
- Ky Duyen as Chang
- André Roanne as Le commissaire
- Marc Valbel as Monsieur Edmond
- Alfred Adam as L'inspecteur de police Malard

== See also ==
- List of French films of 1957

== Bibliography ==
- Goble, Alan. The Complete Index to Literary Sources in Film. Walter de Gruyter, 1999.
- Hayward, Susan. French Costume Drama of the 1950s: Fashioning Politics in Film. Intellect Books, 2010.
