= Eugène Sue (film) =

Eugène Sue was a 1974 French television film on the life of the author Eugène Sue, played by Bernard Verley. It was directed by Jacques Nahum and written by Jean-Louis Bory.

== Cast ==
- Bernard Verley - Eugène Sue
- Jean Davy - Father and commissioner
- Pierre Arditi - Ernest Legouvé
- Loleh Bellon - Marie D'Argoult, muse of Franz Liszt
- Geneviève Casile - Duchesse de Rozan
- Claudine Coster - Olympe Pélissier
- Jacques Ferrière - Balzac
- Marcel Cuvelier - Napoléon III
- Jack Ary - Marshal Soult
- Raluca Sterian - La Polonaise
- Roland Lesaffre - The prefect
- Guy Mairesse - The gaoler
- Gilbert Beugniot - Emile de Girardin
- Fernand Guiot - Bertin
- Francis Roussef - King's attaché
