= Sun in Your Eyes =

1962 film

- Directed by: Jacques Bourdon
- Written by: Jacques Bourdon; Dominique Aury; Michèle Perrein; Eric Schlumberger
- Produced by: Eric Schlumberger
- Starring: Anna Karina
- Cinematography: Lucien Joulin
- Release date: 22 June 1962
- Running time: 102 minutes
- Country: France
- Language: French

Sun in Your Eyes (French: Le Soleil dans l'oeil) is a 1962 French romance film directed by Jacques Bourdon and starring Anna Karina.

== Plot ==
A 23-year-old woman named Emma (Anna Karina) travels to the sunny island of Corsica alone to escape the routine of her relationship with her wealthy, sophisticated, and considerably older Parisian lover, Denis (Georges Descrières). While sunbathing and swimming, Emma hooks up with Frédéric (Jacques Perrin), a beautifully blond, deeply attentive local youth. The romantic fantasy is abruptly shattered when Denis grows suspicious of her distant letters, hops on a flight from Paris, and unceremoniously lands on the island to corner her, forcing Emma to make a difficult choice.

== Cast ==
- Anna Karina as Dagmar
- Georges Descrières as Denis
- Jacques Perrin as Frédéric
- Nadine Alari
- Charles Blavette
- Jean-Luc Godard
- Jean Rochefort
