= Le motorizzate =

- Directed by: Marino Girolami
- Written by: Sergio Corbucci; Marino Girolami; Tito Carpi; Beppo Costa; Aldo Grimaldi
- Starring: Walter Chiari; Raimondo Vianello; Liana Orfei; Sandra Mondaini; Valeria Fabrizi; Ennio Girolami; France Anglade; Sophie Desmarets; Totò
- Cinematography: Mario Fioretti
- Edited by: Enzo G. Castellari
- Music by: Carlo Savina
- Release date: 1963
- Running time: 98 min
- Country: Italy
- Language: Italian

Le motorizzate ("The motorized women") is a 1963 Italian anthology comedy film written and directed by Marino Girolami.

== Plot ==
Five segments. The collision between a van of religious, supporters of the Christian Democrats, and a Fiat 600 with on board a group of young militants of the PCI. Misadventures of a prostitute who works into a caravan placed under a viaduct. A walker faces a foot race to the beat of music. The poor Urbano Cacace impersonates a traffic policeman in order to feed his family. A woman with her brand-new car hit a man who tries to take advantage of the incident attempting an insurance scam.

== Cast ==
- Totò as Urbano Cacace
- Walter Chiari as Walter
- Bice Valori as Lola Rossi
- Ave Ninchi as Sister Teresa
- Sandra Mondaini as the lady driver
- Raimondo Vianello as Camillo
- Gianni Agus as the prosecutor
- France Anglade as Sister Maria
- Carlo Pisacane as Achille
- Valeria Fabrizi as Valeria
- Riccardo Billi as Righetto
- Michel Galabru as Pompeo Saronno
- Vinicio Sofia as Commendator Pelliccioni
- Anna Campori as Miss Cacace
- Jean Tissier as President of the court
- Mario Castellani as Inspector
- Pierre Doris as Lola's client
- Liana Orfei as Cacace's defence counsel
- Ennio Girolami as activist of Communist Party
- Gabriella Andreini as fined girl
- Corrado Mantoni as narrator / interviewer
