= Geneviève Grad =

French actress (1944–2024)

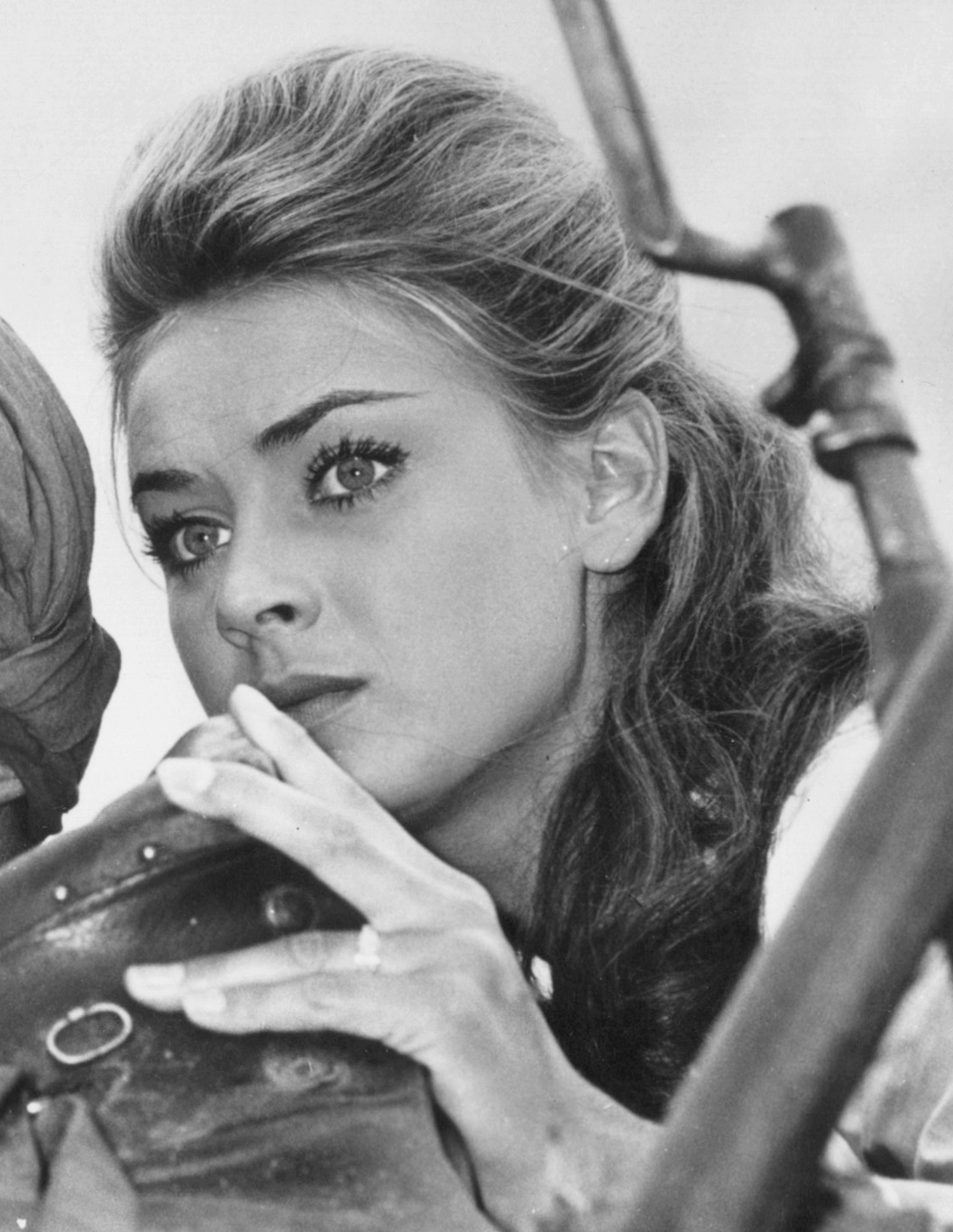
- Grad in 1963
- Born: Geneviève Gabrielle Grad; 5 July 1944; Paris, German-occupied France
- Died: 7 November 2024 (aged 80); La Chaussée-Saint-Victor, France
- Occupation: Actress
- Years active: 1959–1999
- Known for: Gendarme of Saint-Tropez; Capitaine Fracasse
- Spouse: Jean Guillaume (m. 1993)
- Partner: Igor Bogdanoff
- Children: 1

Geneviève Gabrielle Grad (French pronunciation: [ʒənvjɛv ɡabʁijɛl ɡʁa]; 5 July 1944 – 7 November 2024) was a French actress.

== Career ==
Grad played Nicole Cruchot, the daughter of police officer Ludovic Cruchot (Louis de Funès) in the first three films of the Gendarme of Saint-Tropez series from 1964 to 1968.

Among others, she played in two films with Paul Guers as his partner: Flash Love (1972) and Libertés sexuelles (1977).

She also appeared in several made for television films and television series in the 1960s and 1970s.

== Personal life and death ==
Grad had a son with Igor Bogdanoff. She married Jean René André Yvon Guillaume on 19 March 1993. She lived in Vendôme in the Loir-et-Cher.

Grad died from cancer at a clinic in La Chaussée-Saint-Victor, on 7 November 2024, at the age of 80.

== Filmography ==
- 1961: Un soir sur la plage
- 1961: Captain Fracasse
- 1962: The Centurion
- 1962: Arsène Lupin Versus Arsène Lupin
- 1962: Attack of the Normans
- 1962: L'Empire de la nuit
- 1963: Hercules vs. Moloch
- 1963: The Beast of Babylon Against the Son of Hercules
- 1963: Sandokan the Great
- 1964: Gibraltar
- 1964: The Troops of St. Tropez
- 1964: L'Enlèvement d'Antoine Bigut (TV)
- 1965: Chambre à louer (TV)
- 1965: Frédéric le gardian (TV)
- 1965: Gendarme in New York
- 1966: Su nombre es Daphne
- 1967: Le Fossé
- 1967: Quand la liberté venait du ciel (TV)
- 1967: Au théâtre ce soir : Ami-ami
- 1968: Le Démoniaque : Lise
- 1968: Le gendarme se marie
- 1969: Agence intérim (TV)
- 1970: The Palace of Angels
- 1970: OSS 117 Takes a Vacation
- 1972: Flash Love
- 1975: Au théâtre ce soir : La moitié du plaisir
- 1977: Libertés sexuelles
- 1977: Le Maestro
- 1978: Voltaire (or Ce diable d'homme) (TV)
- 1980: Comme une femme : La sœur d'Olivier
- 1980: La Vie des autres (TV)
- 1980: La Pharisienne (TV)
- 1980: Voulez-vous un bébé Nobel?
- 1983: Ça va pas être triste
