= Dis-moi que tu m'aimes =

1974 film

Dis-moi que tu m'aimes is a French film directed by Michel Boisrond, released in 1974.

== Synopsis ==
Two wives (one a housewife and the other a decorator) throw their husbands (businessmen Daniel Ceccaldi and Jean-Pierre Marielle) out. The men are initially delighted to return to bachelorhood.

One man leaves the city to breed sheep in the countryside and the other finds love with another man.

== Details ==
- Title : Dis-moi que tu m'aimes
- Director : Michel Boisrond
- Writers : Annette Wademant and Michel Boisrond
- Cinematography : Daniel Gaudry
- Cameraman : Jean-Paul Cornu
- Editor : Renée Lichtig
- Music : Claude Bolling
- Sound : Bernard Ortion
- Produce : Gérard Beytout (co-production Franco Film - S.N.C. - Mannic Film)
- Distributor : S.N.C.
- Length : 115 minutes
- Release date : 12 December 1974

== Starring ==
- Mireille Darc : Victoire Danois
- Marie-José Nat : Charlotte Le Royer
- Jean-Pierre Marielle : Richard le Royer
- Daniel Ceccaldi : Bertrand Danois
- Georges Descrières : Maître Olivier
- Geneviève Fontanel : Pascaline Dorgeval
- Jean-Pierre Darras : Lucien Dorgeval
- Jean Topart
- Monique Delaroche
- Erik Colin : Charles Tabard
- Lisbeth Hummel : Christiana
- Jacqueline Fogt : la mère de Christiana
