= How Do You Like My Sister? =

1964 film

- Directed by: Michel Boisrond
- Written by: Annette Wademant
- Produced by: Jean Darvey
- Starring: France Anglade; Jacqueline Maillan; Claude Rich
- Cinematography: Jean-Louis Picavet
- Edited by: Jean Mandariva
- Music by: Serge Gainsbourg
- Production company: Mannic Films
- Distributed by: Les Films Sirius
- Release date: 4 March 1964
- Running time: 86 minutes
- Country: France
- Language: French

How Do You Like My Sister? (French: Comment trouvez-vous ma soeur?) is a 1964 French comedy film directed by Michel Boisrond and starring France Anglade, Jacqueline Maillan and Claude Rich.

The film's sets were designed by the art director Jean Mandaroux.

== Synopsis ==
The older sister of a schoolgirl who faces being expelled tries to extricate her from her problems by pretending to be her mother. However she then falls in love with the teacher.

== Cast ==
- France Anglade as Cécile
- Jacqueline Maillan as Charlotte Varangeot
- Claude Rich as François Lorin
- Michel Serrault as Varangeot
- Dany Robin as Martine Jolivet
- Jacques Charon as Jolivet
- Eddie Constantine as Eddie

== Bibliography ==
- Oscherwitz, Dayna & Higgins, Maryellen. The A to Z of French Cinema. Scarecrow Press, 2009.
