= Diamonds Are a Man's Best Friend =

- Original theatrical poster
- Directed by: Vittorio Sala
- Written by: Sandro Continenza; Roberto Gianviti; Alberto Silvestri; Franco Verucci
- Produced by: Edmondo Amati
- Starring: Félix Marten; Liana Orfei; Gastone Moschin
- Cinematography: Fausto Zuccoli
- Music by: Piero Umiliani
- Release date: 1966
- Language: Italian

Diamonds Are a Man's Best Friend (Italian: Ray Master l'inafferrabile) is a 1966 Italian thriller-heist film written and directed by Vittorio Sala and starring Félix Marten, Liana Orfei and Gastone Moschin.

== Plot ==
An adventurer steals a valuable diamond known as "Mountain of Light" from the museum. A band of gangsters gets on his trail to take his loot.

== Cast ==
- Félix Marten as Ray Master
- Liana Orfei as Françoise
- Gastone Moschin as Pete O'Connor
- Alan Collins as Max
- Seyna Seyn as Princess Ratana
- Attilio Dottesio
