= The Light Across the Street =

1956 film by Georges Lacombe

- Directed by: Georges Lacombe
- Written by: Louis Chavance; René Masson; Jacques Gaultier (adaptation cinematographique de)
- Screenplay by: Jacques Gauthier
- Produced by: Jacques Gauthier (scenario original de)
- Starring: Raymond Pellegrin; Roger Pigaut; Brigitte Bardot
- Cinematography: Louis Page
- Edited by: Raymond Leboursier
- Music by: Norbert Glanzberg
- Color process: Black and white
- Production companies: Les Productions Jacques Gauthier; Les Films Fernand Rivers; Compagnie Générale Cinématographique; Général Productions
- Distributed by: Les Films Fernand Rivers
- Release date: 25 January 1956
- Running time: 97 minutes
- Country: France
- Language: French
- Box office: 2,082,146 admissions (France)

The Light Across the Street (French: La Lumière d'en face) is a 1956 French crime drama film directed by Georges Lacombe and starring Raymond Pellegrin, Roger Pigaut and Brigitte Bardot. It was also distributed in the U.S. under the title Female and the Flesh.

== Plot ==
Sensual young Brigitte Bardot and her infirm husband run a small trucker restaurant in this Clouzot- influenced melodrama, before you can say The Postman Always Rings Twice, Brigitte feels attracted to a mechanic from the garage opposite

== Cast ==
- Raymond Pellegrin as Georges Marceau
- Roger Pigaut as Piétri
- Brigitte Bardot as Olivia Marceau
- Claude Romain as Barbette
- Jean Debucourt as Professor Nieumer
- Antonin Berval as Albert (as Berval)
- Daniel Ceccaldi as L'amoureux en panne
- Guy Piérauld as Antoine
- Lucien Hubert as Gaspard
- Guy Pierauld as Antoine (as Guy Pierrault)

== Production ==
Filming took place in August 1955.

== Reception ==
Variety wrote "Though soberly recounted, this rarely gets to the core of the subject. Except for Raymond Pellegrin as the crazed driver, it is ordinarily acted. It goes in for some erotic byplay. Otherwise, it does not have the substance for art houses. Brigitte Bardot looks well but her acting does not equal her physical attributes. Direction, lensing and editing shape as only adequate with exterior settings lending some good production and documentary flavor."
