= How to Succeed in Love =

1962 film

- Directed by: Michel Boisrond
- Written by: Annette Wademant
- Produced by: Julien Rivière
- Starring: Dany Saval; Jean Poiret; Jacqueline Maillan
- Cinematography: Robert Lefebvre
- Edited by: Claudine Bouché
- Music by: Georges Garvarentz
- Production companies: Francos Films; France Cinéma Productions; Produzioni Cinematografiche Mediterranee
- Distributed by: Cinédis
- Release date: 16 November 1962
- Running time: 102 minutes
- Countries: France; Italy
- Language: French

How to Succeed in Love (French: Comment réussir en amour, Italian: La moglie addosso) is a 1962 French-Italian comedy film directed by Michel Boisrond and starring Dany Saval, Jean Poiret and Jacqueline Maillan.

The film's sets were designed by the art director François de Lamothe.

== Synopsis ==
A shy young man working in the publishing industry becomes entranced with a dancer he meets and sets out to win her over.

== Cast ==
- Dany Saval as Sophie Rondeau
- Jean Poiret as Bernard Monod
- Jacqueline Maillan as Edmée Rondeau
- Jacques Charon as Le directeur des Editions du Soleil
- Hélène Duc as La femme du directeur des Editions du Soleil
- Maurice Chevit as L'agent
- Claude Piéplu as Le professeur de danse
- Audrey Arno as Gillian
- Dominique Davray as Joséphine
- Robert Seller as Le docteur
- Noël Roquevert as Le directeur des Editions Saint-Vincent-de-Paul
- Max Montavon as L'éditeur de chansons
- Roger Pierre as Marcel
- Michel Serrault as Le commissaire

== Bibliography ==
- Parish, James Robert. Film Actors Guide: Western Europe. Scarecrow Press, 1977.
