= Women Are Weak =

Weak Women
- Directed by: Michel Boisrond
- Written by: Michel Boisrond; Annette Wademant
- Starring: Alain Delon; Pascale Petit; Mylène Demongeot; Jacqueline Sassard
- Cinematography: Robert Lefebvre
- Edited by: Madeleine Gug
- Music by: Paul Misraki
- Production companies: Euro International Films; Transcontinental Films S.A.
- Distributed by: Les Films Marceau
- Release date: 11 February 1959
- Running time: 99 minutes
- Countries: France; Italy; United States
- Language: French
- Box office: $17.7 million

Weak Women (French: Faibles femmes, Italian: Le donne sono deboli) is a 1959 comedy film featuring Alain Delon. It was one of his first roles and was crucial to launching him as a star. It was also known as Three Murderesses.

The movie was a success at the French box office and achieved release in the US. Delon made some personal appearances in New York to promote the movie.

== Cast ==
- Alain Delon as Julien Fenal
- Mylène Demongeot as Sabine
- Pascale Petit as Agathe
- Jacqueline Sassard as Hélène Maroni
- Simone Renant as Marguerite Maroni
- Monique Mélinand as Madame Fenal
- Héléna Manson as la mère supérieure
- Pierre Mondy as André
- Noël Roquevert as Édouard Maroni
- Albert Médina as Monsieur Courcel
- Anita Ruff as Anita Pérez
- Adrienne Servantie as Madame Courcel
- André Luguet as Monsieur Fenal
- Magdeleine Bérubet as Sister Marguerite
- Yves Barsacq
