= Renaud Verley =

French actor

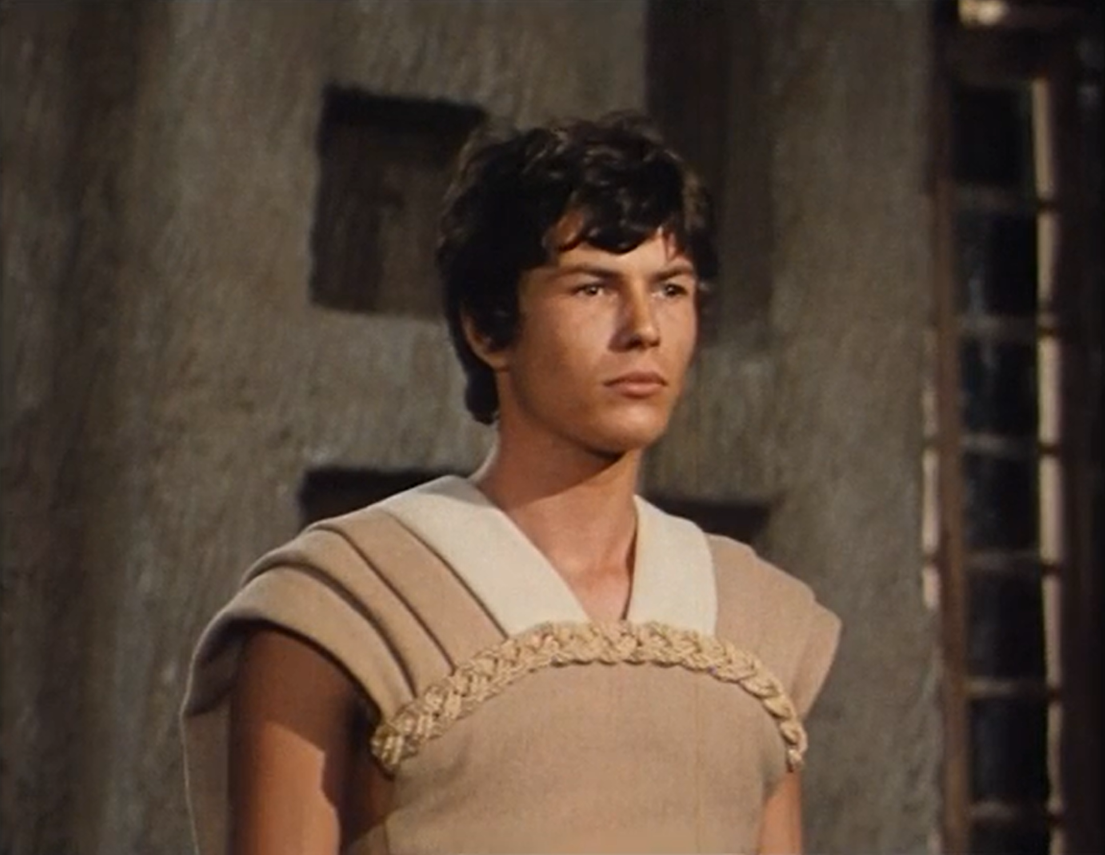
- Verley as Telemachus in 1968's Odissea: dal Poema di Omero
- Born: 9 November 1945 (age 80); Lille, France
- Occupation: Actor
- Years active: 1965–present

Renaud Verley (born 9 November 1945) is a French actor. He appeared in more than twenty films since 1965. His brother, Bernard, is also an actor.

== Filmography ==
Film
Year	Title	Role	Notes
1965	Cent briques et des tuiles	Charles	
1965	The Uninhibited	Serge	
1968	The Private Lesson	Olivier Fermond	
1969	The Pleasure Pit	Olivier	
1969	The Damned	Günther Von Essenbeck	
1969	Nell'anno del Signore	Angelo Targhini	
1970	Cran d'arrêt	Davide Auseri	
1970	Du soleil plein les yeux	Vincent	
1971	Sapho ou la Fureur d'aimer	Lionel de Lancey	
1971	To Love Again	Niko: ‘’Il caso Venere privata (film)il caso Venere privata’’|Davide	
1972	L'Ingénu	L'ingénu	
1972	Koi no natsu		
1973	The Lonely Woman	Jaci	
1973	The Bell from Hell	Juan	
1973	The Girl from the Red Cabaret	Larry Elliot	
1974	The Suspects	Bernard Vauquier	
1980	Un escargot dans la tête	Edouard	
1981	Une robe noire pour un tueur	François Riesler	
1984	The Blood of Others	Le docteur Duval	

TV
Year	Title	Role	Notes
1968	L'Odissea	Telemaco	6 episodes
