= France Anglade =

French Algerian actress (1942–2014)

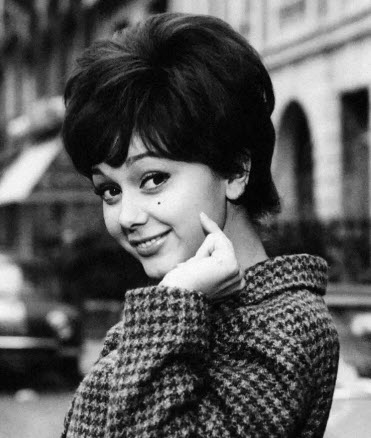
- Anglade in 1962
- Born: Marie-France Anglade; 17 July 1942; Constantine, French Algeria
- Died: 28 August 2014 (aged 72); La Verrière, Yvelines, Île-de-France, France
- Occupation: Actress
- Years active: 1959–1994

Marie-France Anglade (17 July 1942 – 28 August 2014) was a French Algerian film actress.

== Biography ==
Marie-France Anglade was born on 17 July 1942 in Constantine, Algeria. She was known for her roles in Darling Caroline (1968), Highlander: The Series (1992), and 24 Hours to Kill (1965).

== Death ==
She died on August 28, 2014 in La Verrière, Yvelines, France.

== Filmography ==
=== Film ===
Year	Original title	English title	Role	Notes
1959	Guinguette	—N/a	Role unknown	Uncredited
1961	Amours célèbres	Famous Love Affairs	Role unknown	Uncredited
1962	Les Parisiennes	Tales of Paris	Une collégienne (segment "Sophie")	Uncredited
1962	Les sept péchés capitaux	The Seven Deadly Sins	(segment "Envie L")	Uncredited
1962	Comme un poisson dans l'eau	—N/a	Florence	
1962	Le rendez-vous de minuit	—N/a	Fifine/Jacques's Fiancée	
1962	La dénonciation	The Immoral Moment	Role unknown	
1962	Le monsieur de 5 heures	—N/a	Giséle	TV movie
1962	Les dimanches de Ville d'Avray	Sundays and Cybèle	Lulu	
1963	Les bricoleurs	Who Stole the Body?	Une candidate au permis de conduire	
1963	Du mouron pour les petits oiseaux	chicken feed for little birds	La serveuse	
1963	Les veinards	People in Luck	Corinne (segment "Le yacht")	
1963	Le motorizzate	The motorized women	Sister Maria (segment "Carmelitane Sprint")	
1963	Maskenball bei Scotland Yard - Die Geschichte einer unglaublichen Erfindung	—N/a	Brenda	
1964	Comment trouvez-vous ma soeur?	How Do You Like My Sister?	Cécile	
1964	Queste pazze pazze donne	—N/a	Greta ('Il gentil sesso')	
1964	Clémentine chérie	—N/a	Clémentine	
1964	Le repas des fauves	—N/a	Sophie	
1964	L'huitre et la perle	—N/a	L'institutrice	
1964	Canzoni, bulli e pupe	—N/a	France	
1965	Cinquante Millions pour Johns	24 Hours to Kill	The Crew: Françoise Bertram	
1965	Le lit à deux places	The Double Bed	Wife	
1966	James Tont operazione D.U.E.	The Wacky World of James Tont	Helen Collins	
1967	Le plus vieux métier du monde	The Oldest Profession	Catherine (segment ""Aujourd"hui")	
1968	Caroline chérie	Darling Caroline	Caroline de Biévre - une jolie aristocrate aux nombreuses aventures	
1970	La servante	The Servant	Aline	
1973	Coup de sang	—N/a	Françoise Tuarelli	TV movie
1980	Marie-Cavale	—N/a	Marie	TV movie
1981	La chambre 17	—N/a	Jacqueline	TV movie
1981	—N/a	Madame Claude 2	La mére d'Helen	
1982	Le cercle fermé	—N/a	Catherine	
1984	Aldo et Junior	—N/a	Role unknown	
1988	Sortis de route	—N/a	La Mére	
1990	Faux et usage de faux	—N/a	La femme de Charles	
1991	Money	Money	Madame Landau	
1991	Toubab Bi	—N/a	La femme du centre d'accueil	(final film role)

=== Television ===
Year	Original title	English title	Role	Notes
1975	La chasse aux hommes	—N/a	Claude de Pyrène	Episode: "Episode #1.1", "Episode #1.2", "Episode #1.3"
1976	Erreurs judiciaires	—N/a	Josyane Meru	Episode: "Des témoins dignes de foi"
1980	Julien Fontanes, magistrat	Julien Fontanes, magistrat	Liliane	Episode: "Une femme résolue"
1991	Cas de divorce	—N/a	Laura Keller	Episode: "Keller contre Keller"
1994	Highlander (série télévisée)	Highlander: The Series	Shop Owner	Episode: "Unholy Alliance: Part 2"
1994	Les yeux d'Hélène	—N/a	Marraine Régine	Episode: "Episode #1.3"
