= Deux fois =

1968 film by Jackie Raynal

- Directed by: Jackie Raynal
- Starring: Jackie Raynal; Francisco Viader
- Cinematography: André Weinfeld
- Release date: 1968
- Running time: 63 min.
- Country: France / Spain
- Language: French

Deux fois is a 1968 experimental film by Jackie Raynal. Raynal stars in the film, her first as a director; she had previously worked for several years as a film editor, most notably for films in Éric Rohmer's "Six Moral Tales" series (she was, reportedly, the youngest professional editor in France at the time). The film's title, which literally translates as Twice and is sometimes translated into English as Twice Upon a Time, refers to the occasional repetition of scenes or actions.

Gloriously shot in Black and White by Cinematographer André Weinfeld, Deux fois is one of the most notable of the Zanzibar Films, a group of feature-length experimental work made from 1968 to 1970 with the financing of Sylvina Boissonnas. It is also considered a landmark of Feminist filmmaking. Raynal made the film in nine days in Barcelona, Spain, casting a man she had met there, Francisco Viader, as one of the leads.

Regarding the film, the influential French critic Serge Daney wrote: "She put in her film the visionary crazed coldness of major paranoiacs. We also find the murderous, painful madness of Fritz Lang's great films, in which all the fiction is reduced to sketchy outlines, arabesques, leaving almost no trace."
