= Jacques Verdier =

French sports journalist and writer (1957–2018)

- Born: 10 October 1957; Saint-Gaudens, France
- Died: 15 December 2018 (aged 61); Rouède, France
- Occupations: Sports journalist, writer

Jacques Verdier (10 October 1957 — 15 December 2018) was a French sports journalist and writer for Midi Olympique.

== Biography ==
Jacques Verdier was born and spent his youth in Saint-Gaudens. He played rugby at Stade saint-gaudinois. He then left Saint-Gaudens to study literature at Toulouse.

In 1980, became a journalist in the editorial staff of Midi Olympique. In 1997, he became editor-in-chief, succeeding Henri Nayrou. From 2003 to 2017, he was a consultant for Radio Monte-Carlo. He participated in the Moscato Show every Thursday and Friday night and also spoke on the air on Sunday afternoons. On 31 December 2017, he officially retired.

In 1997, he also became a novelist. He held a literary column every Sunday in La Dépêche du Midi and a sports column every Monday in Midi Olympique. His latest book, Pyrénées vagabondes, published by Privat, was released in bookstores in 2018. He died suddenly on December 15, 2018 while jogging.
