= Félix Marten =

German-born French actor

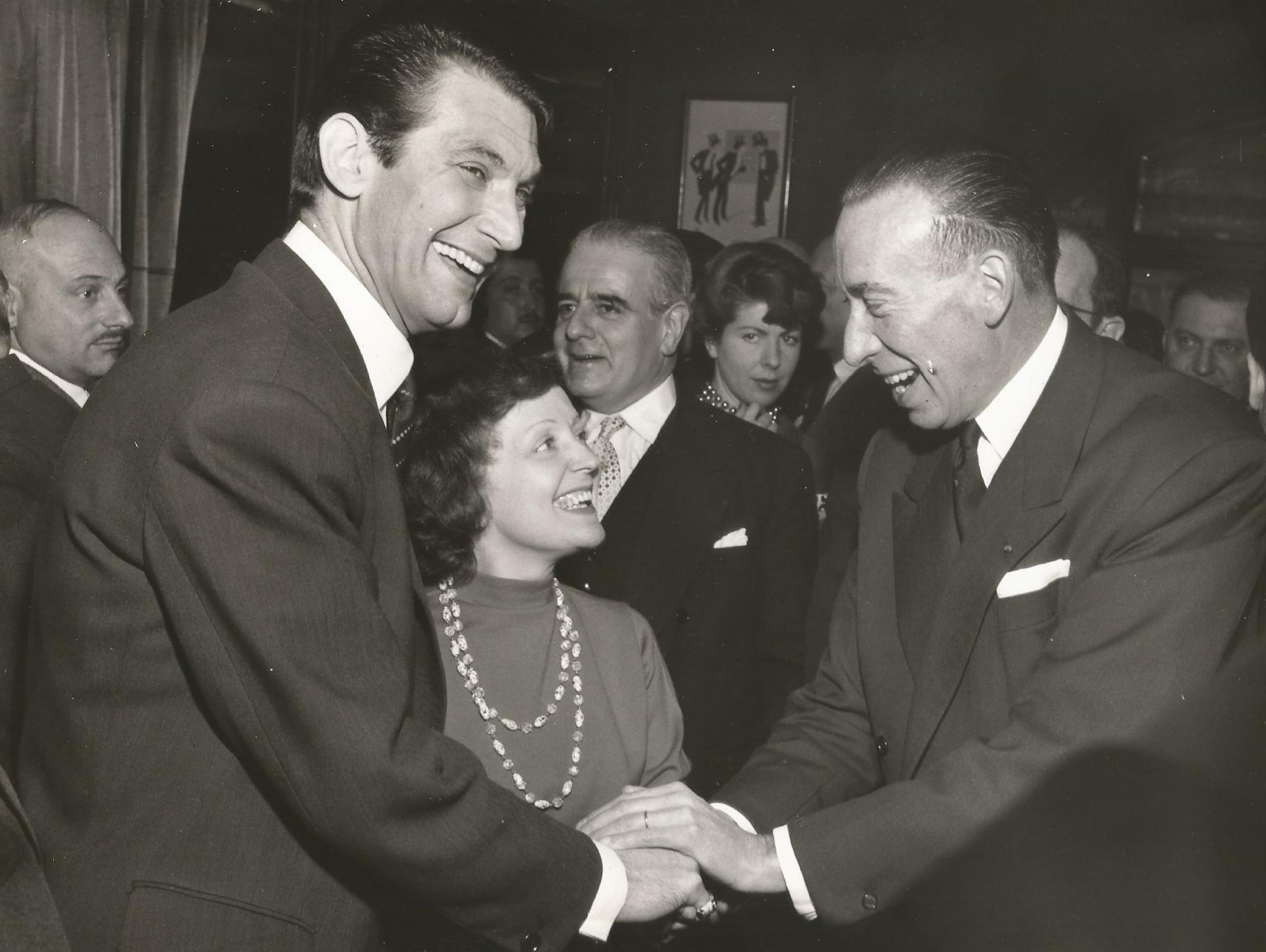
- Félix Marten with Édith Piaf and Pierre Bourgeois
- Born: Felix Paul Gabriel Marten; 29 October 1919; Remagen, Weimar Republic
- Died: 20 November 1992 (aged 73); Saint-Cloud, Hauts-de-Seine, France
- Occupation: Actor
- Years active: 1947–1993

Félix Paul Gabriel Marten (29 October 1919 – 20 November 1992) was a German-born French film actor. He was born in Remagen to a Finnish father, and his family fled Germany following the Nazi takeover. He is one of a number of actors to play Leslie Charteris's character Simon Templar in the 1960 film Le Saint mène la danse.

== Filmography ==
Film
Year	Title	Role	Notes
1947	Rêves d'amour	(unknown role)	English title: Dreams of Love
1953	L'oeil en coulisses	(unknown role)	
1956	Si Paris nous était conté	Le Marquis de Mirabeau (uncredited)	English title: If Paris Were Told to Us
1956	Goubbiah, mon amour	Spence	English title: Kiss of Fire
1956	Pitié pour les vamps	Paul Duke	English Title: Pity for the Vamps
1957	Escapade	Angelo	
1958	Ascenseur pour l'échafaud	Christian Subervie	English title: Elevator to the Gallows
1958	Maxime	Hubert Treffujean	
1959	Délit de fuite	Fred Bartel	
1959	Nathalie, agent secret	Jacques Fabre	English title: Nathalie, Secret Agent
1960	Le huitième jour	Georges	
1960	Le Saint mène la danse	Simon Templar	English title: The Saint Leads the Dance
1961	Dans la gueule du loup	Henry Barbier	
1962	En plein cirage	Félix	English title: Operation Gold Ingot
1962	Der Zigeunerbaron	Istvan Homonay	English title: The Gypsy Baron
1962	Le roi des montagnes	Stavros	
1964	La bonne soupe	Odilon	English title: Careless Love
1964	Le bluffeur	Milord	
1965	La corde au cou	Robert	
1965	La vedovella	Corrado	
1966	Paris brûle-t-il ?	Georges Landrieu	English title: Is Paris Burning?
1966	Ray Master l'inafferrabile	John Martin	English title: Diamonds Are a Man's Best Friend
1968	Le Pasha	Ernest	English title: Pasha
1970	Le Temps des loups	Charles, nightclub owner	English titles: The Heist, The Last Shot
1970	La horse	Marc Grutti	English title: Horse
1972	Le Tueur	Campana	
1972	La guerre des espions	Peter Finshh	
1978	Les raisins de la mort	Paul	English title: The Grapes of Death
1979	Coco la Fleur, candidat	Denis Pauvert	English title: Coco-the-Flower, Candidate
1980	Vivre libre ou mourir	Victor Schoelcher	
1983	Baby Cat	Henry L. Romeux	
1983	Adieu foulards	Georges	
1987	La rumba	Raymond Leprince	English title:
1990	Il y a des jours... et des lunes	The upset mayor	English title: There Were Days... and Moons

Television
Year	Title	Role	Notes
1960	Week-end surprise	Francis	TV movie
1962	Vincent Scotto	Dalbret	TV movie
1969	Le trésor des Hollandais	Le commissaire Boudot	(unknown episodes)
1969	Les enquêtes du commissaire Maigret	Oscar	Season 1, Episode 9
1970	Graf Yoster gibt sich die Ehre	Guy Lebeau	Season 3, Episode 5
1970	Die Marquise von B.	(unknown role)	Miniseries (Episode 1)
1972	Alexander Zwo	Voudier	Miniseries (Episode 2)
1974	La folie des bêtes	M. Mannecier	Season 1, Episode 3
1974	Mort au jury	Delupas	Miniseries (all 4 episodes)
1978	L'inspecteur mène l'enquête	(unknown role)	Season 1, Episode 19
1978	De mémoire d'homme	Le truand	1 episode
1978	Le temps des as	Deperdussin	Miniseries (all 6 episodes)
1981	Messieurs les jurés	Favernay	1 episode
1983	Vichy dancing	Skortich	TV movie
1987	Marie Pervenche	Donald	Season 2, Episode 6
1993	L'affaire Seznec	Charles Huzo	TV movie (posthumous broadcast)

== Bibliography ==
- Barer, Burl. The Saint: A Complete History in Print, Radio, Film and Television of Leslie Charteris' Robin Hood of Modern Crime, Simon Templar, 1928-1992. McFarland, 2003.
