= The Private Lesson (1968 film) =

1968 film

- Directed by: Michel Boisrond
- Written by: Michel Boisrond; Claude Brulé; Annette Wademant
- Produced by: Francis Cosne
- Starring: Nathalie Delon; Renaud Verley; Robert Hossein
- Cinematography: Jean-Marc Ripert
- Edited by: Christian Gaudin
- Music by: Francis Lai
- Production companies: CICC; Francos Films; Mannic Films
- Distributed by: S.N. Prodis
- Release date: 20 December 1968
- Running time: 95 minutes
- Country: France
- Language: French

The Private Lesson (French: La leçon particulière US: Tender Moment ) is a 1968 French drama film directed by Michel Boisrond and starring Nathalie Delon, Renaud Verley and Robert Hossein. It was shot on location around Paris and Avoriaz in the French Alps.

== Synopsis ==
A school student falls in love with a slightly older woman, while her racing driver boyfriend is away in America.

== Cast ==
- Nathalie Delon as Frederique Dampierre
- Renaud Verley as Olivier Fermond
- Robert Hossein as Enrico Fontana
- Katia Christine as Christine
- Martine Sarcey as La mère d'Olivier
- Nicole Desailly as La concierge
- Bernard Le Coq as Jean-Pierre
- Michel Boisrond as Le père d'Olivier
- Henri Lambert as Le motard

== Bibliography ==
- Parish, James Robert. Film Actors Guide: Western Europe. Scarecrow Press, 1977.
