= Georges Descrières =

French actor (1930–2013)

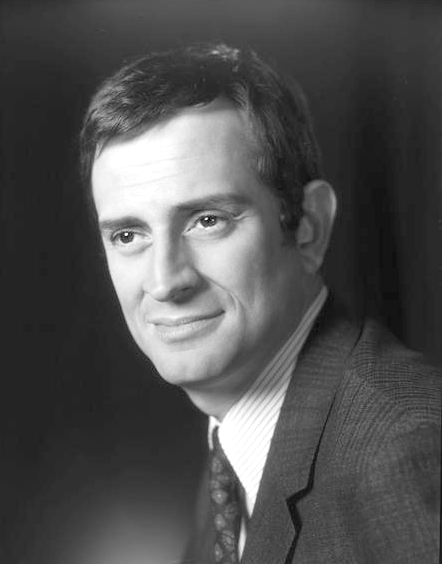
- Born: 15 April 1930; Bordeaux, France
- Died: 19 October 2013 (aged 83); Cannes, France
- Occupation: Actor
- Years active: 1954–1996

Georges Descrières (15 April 1930 – 19 October 2013) was a French actor. He appeared in 52 films and television shows between 1954 and 1996. He starred alongside Anna Karina in the 1962 film Sun in Your Eyes and portrayed the gentleman-burglar title character in the internationally successful TV series Arsène Lupin.

He was appointed an Officer of the Legion of Honour in January 2004 and appointed Grand Officer of the National Order of Merit in May 2011.

== Filmography ==
Year	Title	Role	Notes
1954	The Red and the Black	M. de Croisenois	
1955	Caroline and the Rebels	Lieutenant Tinteville	
1955	Les aristocrates	Philippe de Maubrun	
1957	Bonjour Toubib	Julien Forget dit Junior	
1958	Le bourgeois gentilhomme	Dorante, comte, amant de Dorimène	
1959	Le mariage de Figaro	Le comte Almaviva	
1959	Come Dance with Me	Gérard Lalemand	
1960	Lovers on a Tightrope	Simon	
1961	Tonight or Never	Guillaume	
1961	Le Pavé de Paris	Le chef de cabinet	
1961	The Three Musketeers	Athos	
1962	Sun in Your Eyes	Denis	
1967	Two for the Road	David	
1968	L'Homme à la Buick	Lucien Bordier	
1968	A Flea in Her Ear	Don Carlos de Castilian	
1974	Dis-moi que tu m'aimes	Maître Olivier	
1975	Maître Pygmalion	Christian / Pygmalion I	
1976	Attention les yeux!	Sex Shop Manager	
1977	The Model Couple	Le Ministre de l'Avenir	
1978	L'horoscope	Pierre Quentin-Moreau, le notaire	
1978	Les ringards		Uncredited
1978	Le sucre	Vandelmont	
1982	Qu'est-ce qui fait craquer les filles...	Joncard, the hotel manager	
1982	Mon Curé Chez les Nudistes	Monseigneur	
1987	The Man Who Wasn't There	Alexandre	
