= Henri Vidal =

French actor

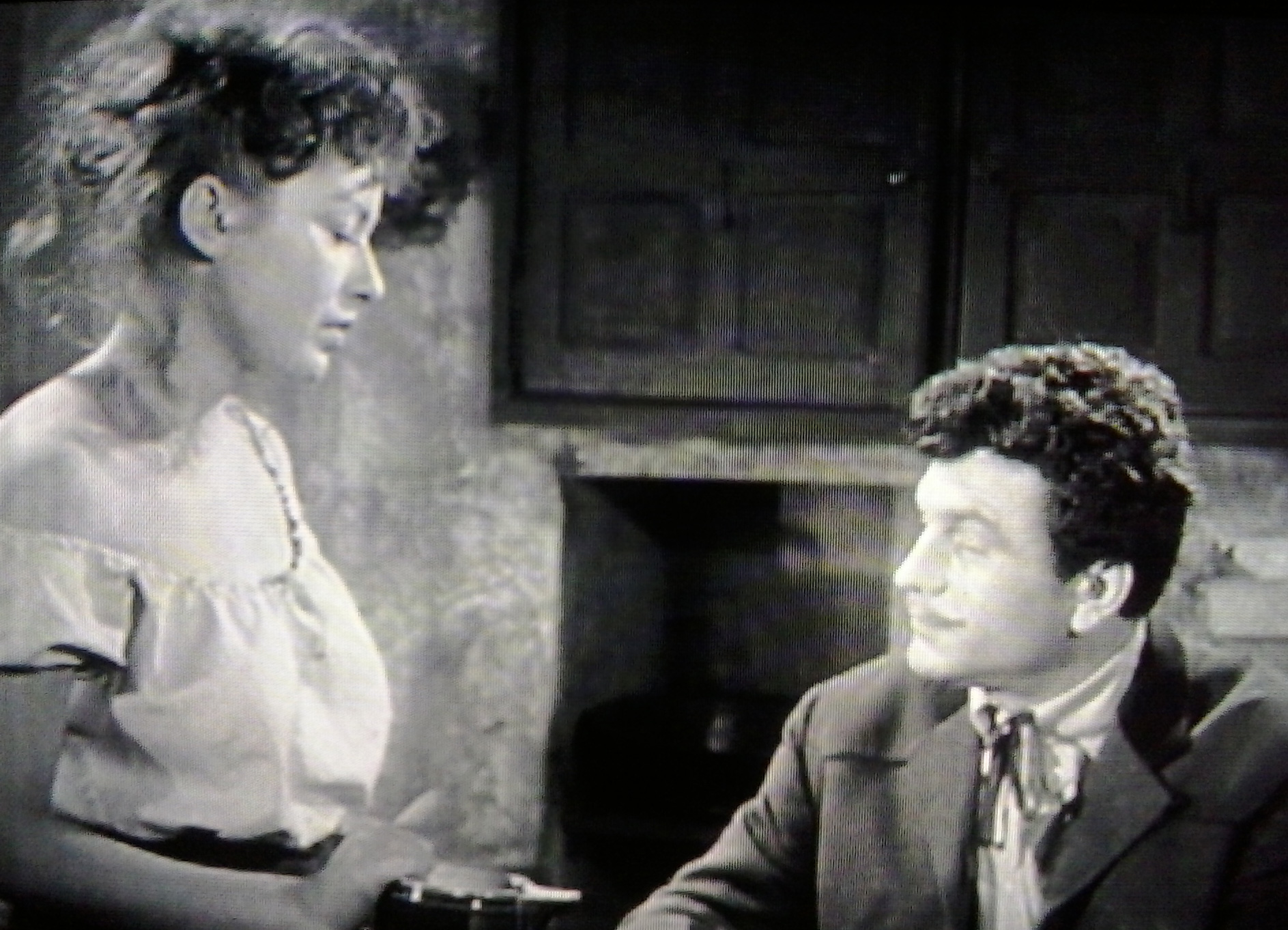
- Henri Vidal and Claudine Dupuis in Les Sept péchés capitaux (1952) ("La Gourmandise")
- Born: 26 November 1919; Royat, Puy-de-Dôme, France
- Died: 10 December 1959 (aged 40); Paris, France
- Occupation: Actor
- Years active: 1941–1959
- Spouses: Michèle Cordoue (m. 1943; div. 1946) Michèle Morgan (m. 1950)

Henri Vidal (26 November 1919 – 10 December 1959) was a French film actor.

== Film career ==
Henri Lucien Raymond Vidal was first noticed after he won the "Apollo of 1939" contest in Paris. He was spotted by Édith Piaf, and made his film debut alongside her in the movie Montmartre-sur-Seine in 1941. Vidal went on to appear in more than 30 films between 1941 and 1959.

In addition to his wife, Michèle Morgan, he played opposite some of the biggest leading ladies in French films of the 1950s: Françoise Arnoul, Brigitte Bardot, Dany Carrel, Mylène Demongeot, Sophia Loren, Romy Schneider, and Marina Vlady.

== Personal life ==
In May 1943 he married the actress Michèle Cordoba, and they divorced in July 1946. In 1950 he married French actress Michèle Morgan, whom he met while filming Alessandro Blasetti's 1949 film Fabiola.

== Death ==
He died in 1959 of a heart attack. He is buried in Pontgibaud, in the Puy-de-Dôme department.

== Filmography ==
Year	Title	Role	Director	Notes
1941	Montmartre-sur-Seine	Maurice Cazaux	Georges Lacombe	
1943	Home Port	Raymond	Jean Choux	
1944	The Angel of the Night	Bob	André Berthomieu	
1946	Strange Fate	Alain deSaulieu	Louis Cuny	
1947	Naughty Martine	Pierre	Emil E. Reinert	
1947	Les Maudits	Doctor Guilbert	René Clément	
1949	Fabiola	Rual	Alessandro Blasetti	
1949	The Hell of Lost Pilots	Capitaine Bertrand	Georges Lampin	
1950	La Belle que voilà	Pierre Leroux	Jean-Paul Le Chanois	
1950	Quay of Grenelle	Jean-Louis Lavalade	Emil E. Reinert	
1951	The Passerby	François Malard	Henri Calef	
1951	L'Étrange Madame X	Etienne	Jean Grémillon	
1952	Les Sept péchés capitaux	Le docteur Henri / Antonin	Carlo Rim	(segment "Gourmandise, La / Gluttony")
1952	Desperate Decision	Steve	Yves Allégret	
1952	Article 519, Penal Code	Renato Berti	Leonardo Cortese	
1952	It Happened in Paris	Vladimir Krasnya	John Berry and Henri Lavorel	
1953	Scampolo 53	Enrico Sacchi	Giorgio Bianchi	
1954	Orient-Express	Jacques Ferrand	Carlo Ludovico Bragaglia	
1954	Attila	Aetius	Pietro Francisci	
1955	Série noire	Inspecteur Léo Fardier	Pierre Foucaud	
1955	Napoléon	Joachim Murat	Sacha Guitry	
1955	House on the Waterfront	Michel	Edmond T. Gréville	
1955	The Wicked Go to Hell	Pierre Macquart	Robert Hossein	
1957	Action immédiate	Francis Coplan	Maurice Labro	
1957	Porte des Lilas	Pierre Barbier	René Clair	
1957	A Kiss for a Killer	Philippe Delaroche	Henri Verneuil	
1957	Charming Boys	Jo, dit Kid Chabanne - le boxeur	Henri Decoin	
1957	Une Parisienne	Michel Legrand	Michel Boisrond	
1958	Be Beautiful But Shut Up	Jean Morel	Marc Allégret	
1959	Les naufrageurs	Yann Le Coeur	Charles Brabant	
1959	Pensione Edelweiss	Jean Monnier	Ottorino Franco Bertolini	
1959	Pourquoi viens-tu si tard?	Walter Hermelin	Henri Decoin	
1959	La Bête à l'affût	Daniel Morane	Pierre Chenal	
1959	An Angel on Wheels	Pierre Chaillot	Géza von Radványi	
1959	Voulez-vous danser avec moi ?	Hervé Dandieu	Michel Boisrond	Posthumous Release
