= Francis Cosne =

French film producer

- Born: 17 May 1916; France
- Died: 13 December 1984 (aged 68); Paris, France
- Occupations: Film producer, screenwriter
- Years active: 1948–1979

Francis Cosne (17 May 1916 – 13 December 1984) was a French film producer and screenwriter. He produced more than 30 films between 1948 and 1979. In 1972, he was a member of the jury at the 22nd Berlin International Film Festival.

== Selected filmography ==
- Les Parents terribles (1948)
- Convicted (1948)
- The Cupid Club (1949)
- The Cape of Hope (1951)
- Fanfan la Tulipe (1952)
- Lucrèce Borgia (1953)
- Madame du Barry (1954)
- Women's Club (1956)
- Angélique, Marquise des Anges (1964)
- Marvelous Angelique (1965)
- Angelique and the King (1966)
- Untamable Angelique (1967)
- Angelique and the Sultan (1968)
- The Private Lesson (1968)
- Cran d'arrêt (1970)
- Une femme fidèle (1976)
