= Michel Boisrond =

French film director and screenwriter (1921–2002)

- Born: Michel Jacques Boisrond; 9 October 1921; Châteauneuf-en-Thymerais, France
- Died: 10 November 2002 (aged 81); La Celle-Saint-Cloud, France
- Occupations: Film director, screenwriter
- Years active: 1947–2002

Michel Jacques Boisrond (9 October 1921 – 10 November 2002) was a French film director and screenwriter.

== Career ==
A former apprentice of Jean Delannoy, Jean Cocteau, and René Clair, Michel Boisrond debuted as a full-fledged director in 1955 with Cette Sacrée Gamine starring Brigitte Bardot.

His works typically fall into the comedy, romance, or comedy drama genres.

== Filmography ==
Year	Title	Role	Notes
1947	Histoire de chanter	Assistant director	Directed by Gilles Grangier
1947	Rocambole	Assistant director	Directed by Jacques de Baroncelli
1947	La revanche de Baccarat	Assistant director	Directed by Jacques de Baroncelli
1947	Rendez-vous à Paris	Assistant director	Directed by Gilles Grangier (2)
1948	Ruy Blas	Assistant director	Directed by Pierre Billon
1949	Jo la Romance	Assistant director	Directed by Gilles Grangier (3)
1950	Beauty and the Devil	Assistant director	Directed by René Clair
1951	Les petites Cardinal	Assistant director	Directed by Gilles Grangier (4)
1951	Deux sous de violettes	Technical collaborator	Directed by Jean Anouilh
1952	The Snows of Kilimanjaro	Assistant director	Directed by Henry King
1952	Beauties of the Night	Assistant director	Directed by René Clair (2)
1953	Un acte d'amour	Assistant director	Directed by Anatole Litvak
1953	Un caprice de Caroline chérie	Assistant director	Directed by Jean-Devaivre
1954	Crainquebille	Assistant director	Directed by Ralph Habib
1955	The Grand Maneuver	Assistant director	Directed by René Clair (3)
1955	Interdit de séjour	Assistant director	Directed by Maurice de Canonge
1955	Escale à Orly	Assistant director	Directed by Jean Dréville
1955	Mr. Arkadin	Production manager	Directed by Orson Welles
1956	Lorsque l'enfant paraît	Director	
1956	Naughty Girl	Director & writer	
1956	It Happened in Aden	Director & writer	
1957	The Parisian	Director & writer	
1959	Women Are Weak	Director & writer	Nominated - Mar del Plata International Film Festival - Best Film
1959	Come Dance with Me	Director & writer	
1959	Way of Youth	Director	
1960	Love and the Frenchwoman	Director	
1961	Famous Love Affairs	Director	
1961	One Night on the Beach	Director & writer	
1962	Tales of Paris	Director & writer	
1962	How to Succeed in Love	Director	
1964	How Do You Like My Sister?	Director	
1964	Comment épouser un premier ministre	Director	
1964	Cherchez l'idole	Director & producer	
1966	Atout cœur à Tokyo pour OSS 117	Director	
1967	The Man Who Was Worth Millions	Director & writer	
1967	Le Samouraï	Actor	
1968	The Private Lesson	Director, writer & actor	
1970	Du soleil plein les yeux	Director & writer	
1971	On est toujours trop bon avec les femmes	Director	
1972	Le petit poucet	Director	
1974	Dis-moi que tu m'aimes	Director & writer	
1975	Catherine et Compagnie	Director	
1977-78	Les folies Offenbach	Director	TV Mini-Series
1981	Histoire contemporaine	Director & writer	TV Mini-Series
1982	Toutes griffes dehors	Director	TV Mini-Series
1984	Tout comme un homme	Director	TV movie
1984	Le Bon Plaisir	Actor	Directed by Francis Girod
1986-87	Le Tiroir secret	Director	TV Mini-Series
1986-91	Série rose	Director	TV series (4 episodes)
1987	Cinéma 16	Director	TV series (1 episode)
1989-90	Le retour d'Arsène Lupin	Director	TV series (2 episodes)
1991	Marie Curie, une femme honorable	Director	TV Mini-Series
1992	Séparément vôtre	Director	TV movie
1993	Meurtre en ut majeur	Director & writer	TV movie
1995	L'histoire du samedi	Writer	TV series (1 episode)
1995	Police des polices	Director	TV series (6 episodes)
