= Brigitte Bardot filmography =

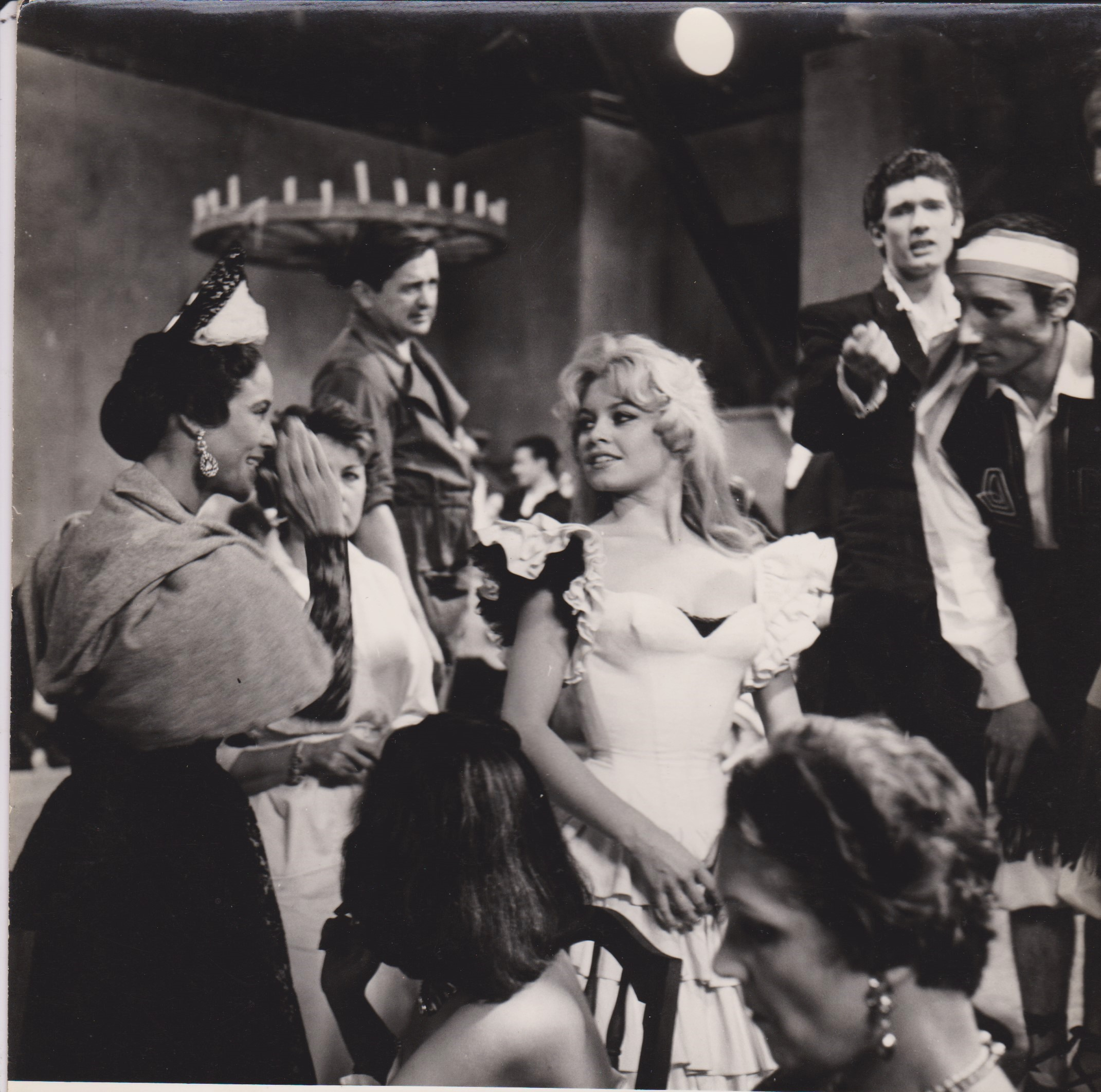
Bardot in The Female (1959)

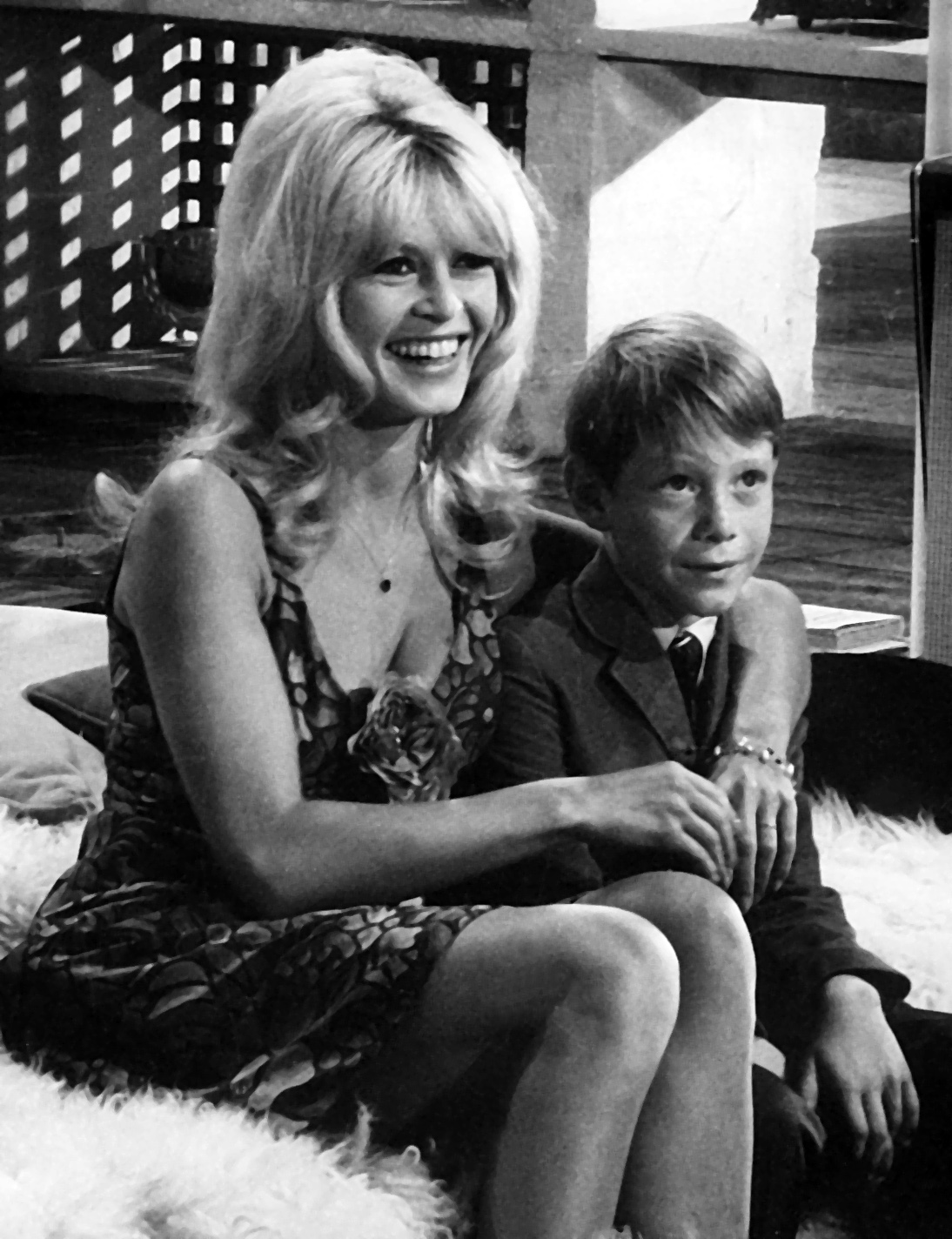
Bardot in Dear Brigitte (1965)

Brigitte Bardot (28 September 1934 – 28 December 2025) was a French actress, singer and fashion model, who later became an animal rights activist.

== Filmography ==
Year	Title	Role	Notes
1952	Crazy for Love (French: Le Trou normand)	Javotte Lemoine	Debut role
1952	Manina, the Girl in the Bikini (French: Manina, la fille sans voile)	Manina	
1952	The Long Teeth (French: Les dents longues)	Bridesmaid	Uncredited
1953	His Father's Portrait (French: Le Portrait de son père)	Domino	
1953	Act of Love (French: Un acte d'amour)	Mimi	
1954	Royal Affairs in Versailles (French: Si Versailles m'était conté)	Mademoiselle de Rozille	
1954	Concert of Intrigue	Anna	Also known as Tradita and Night of Love
1955	Caroline and the Rebels (French: Le Fils de Caroline chérie)	Pilar d'Aranda	
1955	School for Love (French: Futures vedettes)	Sophie	
1955	Doctor at Sea	Hélène Colbert	
1955	The Grand Maneuver (French: Les grandes manoeuvres)	Lucie	
1955	The Light Across the Street (French: La Lumière d'en face)	Olivia Marceau	
1956	Helen of Troy	Andraste	
1956	Naughty Girl (French: Cette sacrée gamine)	Brigitte Latour	
1956	Nero's Mistress (Italian: Mio figlio Nerone)	Poppaea Sabina	
1956	Plucking the Daisy (French: En effeuillant la marguerite)	Agnès Dumont	Also known as Mam'selle Striptease
1956	And God Created Woman (French : Et Dieu... créa la femme)	Juliette Hardy	
1956	The Bride Is Much Too Beautiful (French: La Mariée est trop belle)	Chouchou	
1957	The Parisian (French: Une Parisienne)	Brigitte Laurier	
1958	The Night Heaven Fell (French: Les bijoutiers du clair de lune)	Ursula	
1958	In Case of Adversity aka Love Is My Profession (French: En cas de malheur)	Yvette Maudet	
1959	The Female (French: La femme et le Pantin (The Woman and the Puppet)/Italian: Femmina)	Eva Marchand	Also known as The Woman and the Puppet
1959	Babette Goes to War (French: Babette s'en va-t-en guerre)	Babette	
1959	Come Dance with Me (French: Voulez-vous danser avec moi?)	Virginie Dandieu	
1960	Testament of Orpheus (French: Le Testament d'Orphée)	Herself	Cameo
1960	It Happened All Night (French: Affaire d'une nuit)	Restaurant patron	Uncredited cameo
1960	The Truth (French: La Vérité)	Dominique Marceau	David di Donatello Award for Best Foreign Actress
1961	Please, Not Now! (French: La Bride sur le cou)	Sophie	
1961	Famous Love Affairs (French: Les Amours célèbres)	Agnes Bernauer	
1962	A Very Private Affair (French: Vie privée)	Jill	
1962	Love on a Pillow (French: Le Repos du guerrier)	Geneviève Le Theil	
1963	Contempt (French: Le Mépris)	Camille Javal	
1964	The Ravishing Idiot (French: Une ravissante idiote)	Penelope Lightfeather	
1965	Dear Brigitte	Herself	Uncredited
1965	Viva Maria!	Maria II	Nominated: BAFTA Award for Best Foreign Actress
1966	Sunshine Marie (French: Marie Soleil)	Herself	Cameo
1966	Male Female: 15 Specific Events (French: Masculin, féminin: 15 faits précis)	Herself	Cameo
1967	Two Weeks in September (French: À coeur joie)	Cecile	
1968	Spirits of the Dead (French: Histoires extraordinaires)	Giuseppina	
1968	Shalako	Countess Irina Lazaar	
1969	Women (French: Les Femmes)	Clara	Also known as The Vixen
1970	The Bear and the Doll (French: L'Ours et la Poupée)	Felicia	
1970	The Beginner (French: Les Novices)	Agnès	
1971	Rum Runners (French: Boulevard du Rhum)	Linda Larue	
1971	The Legend of Frenchie King (French: Les Pétroleuses)	Louise	
1973	Don Juan, or If Don Juan Were a Woman (French: Don Juan 1973 ou Si Don Juan était une femme...)	Jeanne	
1973	The Edifying and Joyous Story of Colinot (French: L'histoire très bonne et très joyeuse de Colinot Trousse-Chemise)	Arabelle	Final film role
