= La Madrague =

La Madrague may refer to:

- La Madrague (Saint-Tropez), a house in Saint-Tropez, France, that belonged to actress and activist Brigitte Bardot
- "La Madrague" (song), by Jean-Max Rivière and Gérard Bourgeois, first performed by Bardot in 1963

== See also ==
- fr:Madrague (homonymie): disambiguation page on French Wikipedia
