= Printemps au parking =

- Author: Christiane Rochefort
- Language: French
- Genre: Drama
- Publisher: Éditions Grasset
- Publication date: 1969
- Publication place: France
- ISBN: 978-2253010142

Printemps au parking (Spring in the Parking Lot) is a novel by Christiane Rochefort. It was published in 1969 by Bernard Grasset.

The novel tells the story of Christophe, a young delinquent who enters a relationship with Chinese language student Thomas, by which means he develops as a person. The ending of the story was entirely re-written by Rochefort in the mid 1970s, who stated that she and other readers had hated the first version.

Rochefort accounted that, throughout the writing of the book, she had to overcome her unconscious prejudices against homosexual relations. She published the novel between a number of essays about sexuality, in which she wrote that "sexuality is one of the most rapid, most abrupt, most immediate ways of managing to raise consciousness" about politics and ethics.

As of Rochefort's death in 1998, the book had never been published in English.
