= Sidonie (song) =

Single by Brigitte Bardot
- B-side: "Thème de Vie privée (François Carpi)"
- Released: 1962
- Label: Barclay
- Songwriters: Yanni Spanos, Jean-Max Rivière

"Sidonie" is a song performed by Brigitte Bardot in the 1962 film A Very Private Affair, directed by Louis Malle. It was released on 45 rpm in the same year.

== Background ==
The song was written specifically for the film A Very Private Affair (1962). The film's director, Louis Malle, encouraged Bardot to sing it.

The song is based on the 1860 poem Les Triolets fantaisistes by Charles Cros and was written by Greek Yanni Spanos during his stay in Paris and French composer Jean-Max Rivière.

== Reception ==
The French TV station BFM TV, the French radio station Delta FM, and the Swiss daily newspaper 24 heures included the song in their top lists of « Brigitte Bardot's best cult hits ».

== Charts ==
Chart (1962)	Peak position
Belgium (Ultratop 50 Wallonia)	28
