= Christiane Rochefort =

French feminist writer

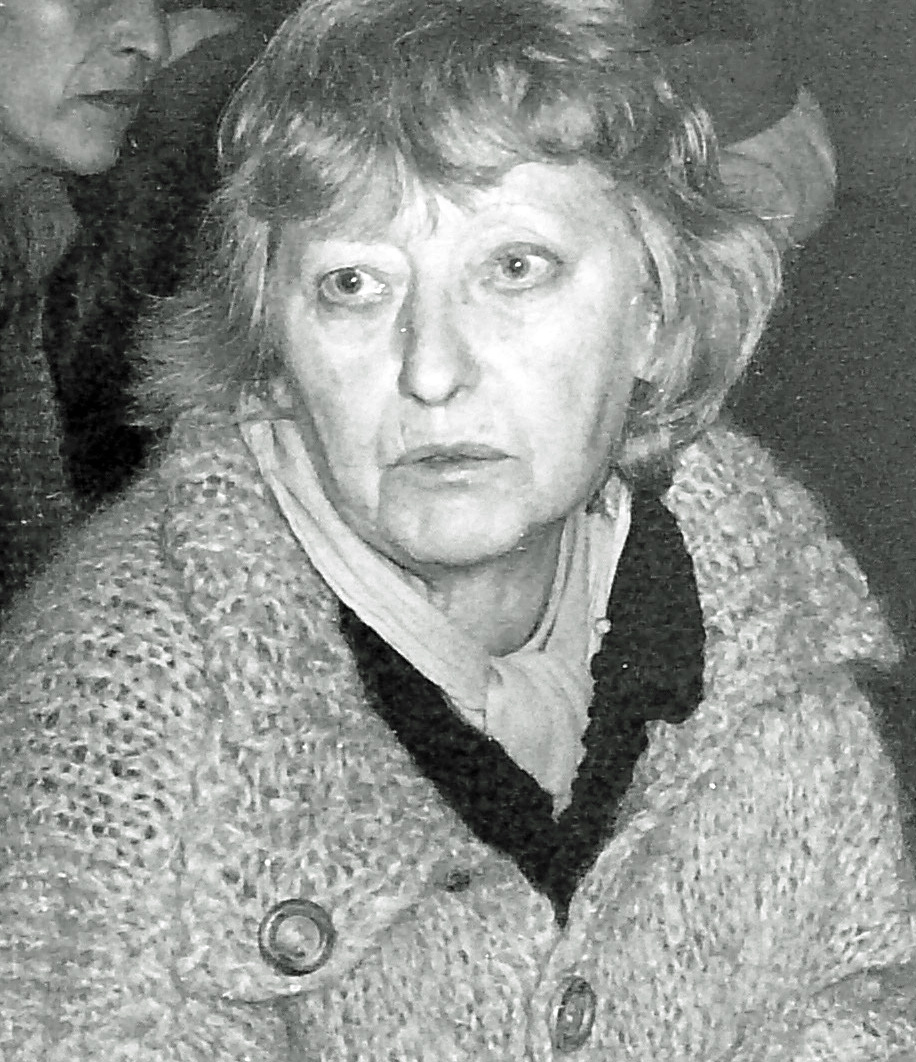
- Born: 17 July 1917
- Died: 24 April 1998 (aged 80)
- Occupation: French writer

Christiane Rochefort (17 July 1917 – 24 April 1998) was a French feminist writer. She was born into a left-wing working class Parisian family; her father joined the International Brigades during the Spanish Civil War. Rochefort worked as a journalist and spent fifteen years as a press attaché to the Cannes Film Festival before publishing her first novel, Le Repos du guerrier (The Warrior's Rest), in 1958. Like several of her later novels, Le Repos du guerrier was a bestseller; in 1962 it was adapted into a popular film directed by Roger Vadim and starring Brigitte Bardot. Her novels are divided between social realist satires set in present-day France and utopian or dystopian fantasies. She won the Prix Médicis in 1988. Rochefort's novels also have strong sexual elements.

== Novels ==
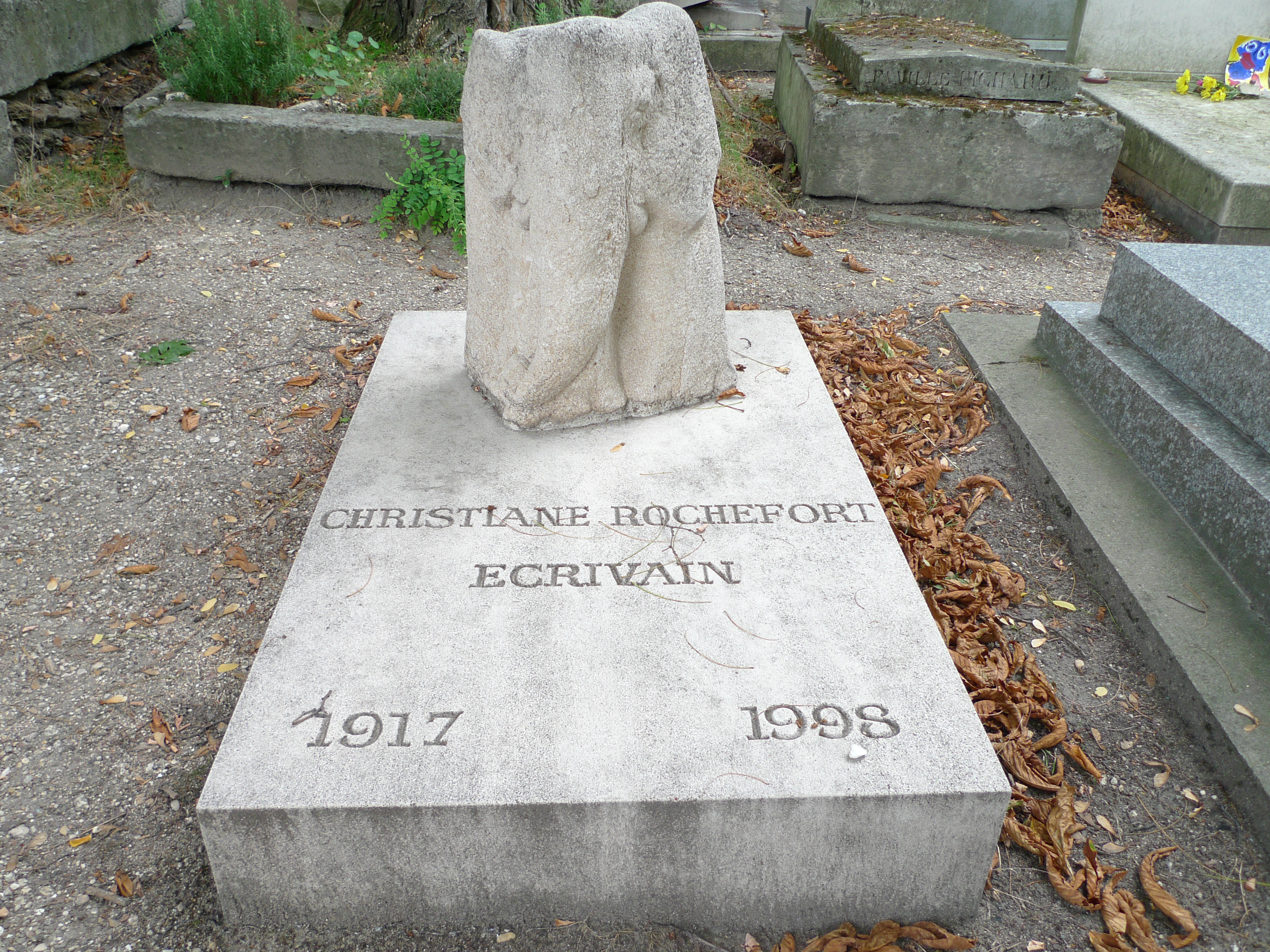
Rochefort's grave

- Cendres et or (1956)
- Le repos du guerrier (1958) – Warrior's Rest (translated by Lowell Bair, 1959)
- Les petits enfants du siècle (1961) – Children of Heaven (translated by Linda Asher, 1962)/Josyane and the Welfare (translated by Edward Hyams, 1963)
- Les stances à Sophie (1963) - Cat's Don't Care for Money (translated by Helen Eustis, 1965)
- Une rose pour Morrison (1966) (dedicated to Mister Bob Dylan)
- Printemps au parking (1969)
- Archaos, ou le Jardin Etincelant (1972)
- Encore heureux qu'on va vers l'été (1975)
- Quand tu vas chez les femmes (1982)
- La porte du fond (1988) Prix Médicis (dedicated to Jeffrey Moussaieff Masson)
- Conversations sans paroles (1997)

== See also ==
- Les Stances a Sophie
