= Jean Bretonnière =

French actor and singer (1924–2001)

- Born: 22 October 1924; Tours, France
- Died: 13 March 2001 (aged 76); Romainville, France
- Occupations: Actor, singer
- Years active: 1951–1980 (film and television)

Jean Bretonnière (French pronunciation: [ʒɑ̃ bʁətɔnjɛʁ]; 22 October 1924 – 13 March 2001) was a French actor and singer. He was married to the actress Geneviève Kervine.

== Selected filmography ==
- Under the Sky of Paris (1951)
- The Green Glove (1952)
- It Happened in Aden (1954)
- Naughty Girl (1956)
- The Judge and the Assassin (1976)

== Bibliography ==
- Goble, Alan. The Complete Index to Literary Sources in Film. Walter de Gruyter, 1999.
