= Plucking the Daisy =

- Directed by: Marc Allégret
- Written by: Marc Allégret; Roger Vadim
- Based on: William Benjamin
- Produced by: Raymond Eger
- Starring: Daniel Gélin; Brigitte Bardot
- Cinematography: Louis Page
- Edited by: Suzanne de Troeye
- Music by: Paul Misraki
- Color process: Black and white
- Production companies: Films EGE; Hoche Productions
- Distributed by: Les Films Corona
- Release date: 5 October 1956
- Running time: 101 minutes
- Country: France
- Language: French
- Box office: 3,296,793 admissions (France)

Plucking the Daisy (French: En effeuillant la marguerite) is a 1956 French comedy film directed by Marc Allégret and starring Daniel Gélin and Brigitte Bardot.

It was also known as Mam'selle Striptease and Please Mr Balzac. (Also known as "Mademoiselle Striptease" and often confused with 1957 French film "Mademoiselle Strip-tease")

== Plot ==
General Dumont discovers that his daughter Agnes is "A.D.", author of a scandalous under-the-counter novel.

He tries to send her to a convent but she escapes to Paris to live with her brother. On the train she meets Daniel, a journalist. Agnes thinks her brother is a rich artist but he's actually a poor guide in the Balzac Museum.

Agnes needs money and enters an amateur striptease contest. Daniel is covering the contest for his magazine.

== Cast ==
- Daniel Gélin as Daniel Roy
- Brigitte Bardot as Agnès Dumont
- Robert Hirsch as Roger Vital
- Jacques Dumesnil as General Dumont
- Jacques Bouillaud as Himself
- Georges Chamarat as Bacchus
- Jacques Fervil as Himself
- Jacques Jouanneau as Edouard, Friend of Daniel
- Mauricet as Monsieur Valentin
- Yves-Marie Maurin as Toto
- Madeleine Barbulée as Mme Dumont
- Anne Collette as La secrétaire
- Gabrielle Fontan as Himself
- Luciana Paluzzi as Sophia (as Luciana Paoluzzi)
- Nadine Tallier as Magali
- Darry Cowl as Hubert Dumont

== Production ==
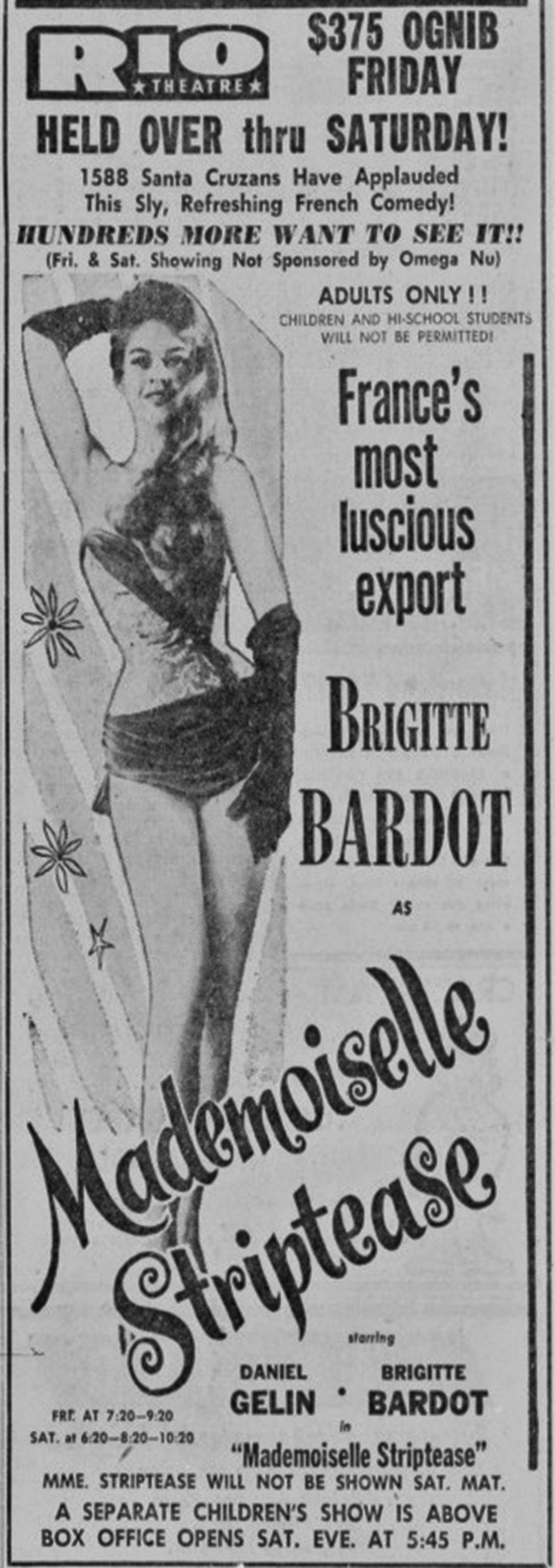
U.S advertisement from 1958

Roger Vadim had just written a movie which launched Bardot as a leading lady, Naughty Girl. He called this movie "a hack job based on an 'original idea' by the producer which was anything but original... I changed the plot and wrote an amusing, romantic and sexy story."

== Reception ==
=== Box office ===
In 1956, the film was the 20th most popular of the year, at the French box office. It was released before Bardot's film And God Created Woman, which was the 13th most popular and Naughty Girl which was 12th.

=== Critical reception ===
Variety felt Bardot "still lacks glib comedy assurance."

It was released in the US as Mademoiselle Striptease. The Washington Post called it "one of the nicest comedies of the summer." The Los Angeles Times called it "a most delightful, naughty and very funny comedy... Bardot strikes pure gold... it's strictly a fun show that doesn't try to prove a thing."

It was also released in the US as Please Mr Balzac. The New York Times said the "sole excuse for this singularly unfrothy and unfunny romantic comedy is Brigitte Bardot....[a] thin, old-fashioned, slightly smutty and extremely dull charade... The picture is pretty awful. It needn't have been."

In a retrospective review, Turner Classic Movies called it "a typical French romantic comedy... complete with a meet-cute on a train, and plenty of loving shots of Bardot's pert behind.... typical of the suggestive but innocuous films that Bardot made early in her career."
