= La Vérité (film) =

- Film poster
- Directed by: Henri-Georges Clouzot
- Written by: Henri-Georges Clouzot; Véra Clouzot; Simone Drieu; Jérôme Géronimi; Michèle Perrein; Christiane Rochefort
- Produced by: Raoul Lévy
- Starring: Brigitte Bardot; Charles Vanel; Paul Meurisse
- Cinematography: Armand Thirard
- Edited by: Albert Jurgenson
- Color process: Black and white
- Production companies: C. E. I. A. P. Han Productions
- Distributed by: Columbia Pictures
- Release date: 2 November 1960
- Running time: 127 minutes
- Countries: France; Italy
- Language: French
- Box office: 5,694,993 admissions (France)

La Vérité (occasionally released under its English translation The Truth) is a 1960 French drama film directed by Henri-Georges Clouzot, and starring Brigitte Bardot. The film was nominated for the Academy Award for Best Foreign Language Film.

== Plot ==
Two young lovers, Dominique and Gilbert, are found in the aftermath of an attempted murder-suicide. Gilbert is dead from multiple gunshots, while Dominique is unconscious and near death from gas inhalation. Dominique is revived, arrested, and put on trial for the murder of Gilbert. Her life story and the circumstances leading up to the crime are recounted in detail, leading to a series of flashbacks intercut with the trial.

Dominique is the elder of two sisters who live in a small provincial town with their parents. The younger sister, Annie, is a studious aspiring violinist, while Dominique avoids work and leads a directionless, leisurely lifestyle. When Annie moves to Paris for music school, Dominique wants to join her, overdosing on pills when their parents refuse. After this, Dominique gets her way, and the sisters move in together. Dominique falls in with a group of rebellious young intellectuals, earning herself a reputation for promiscuity. Gilbert, an ambitious young conductor, befriends Annie and visits the apartment, finding a nude Dominique who flirts with him. After this, Annie kicks Dominique out of the apartment.

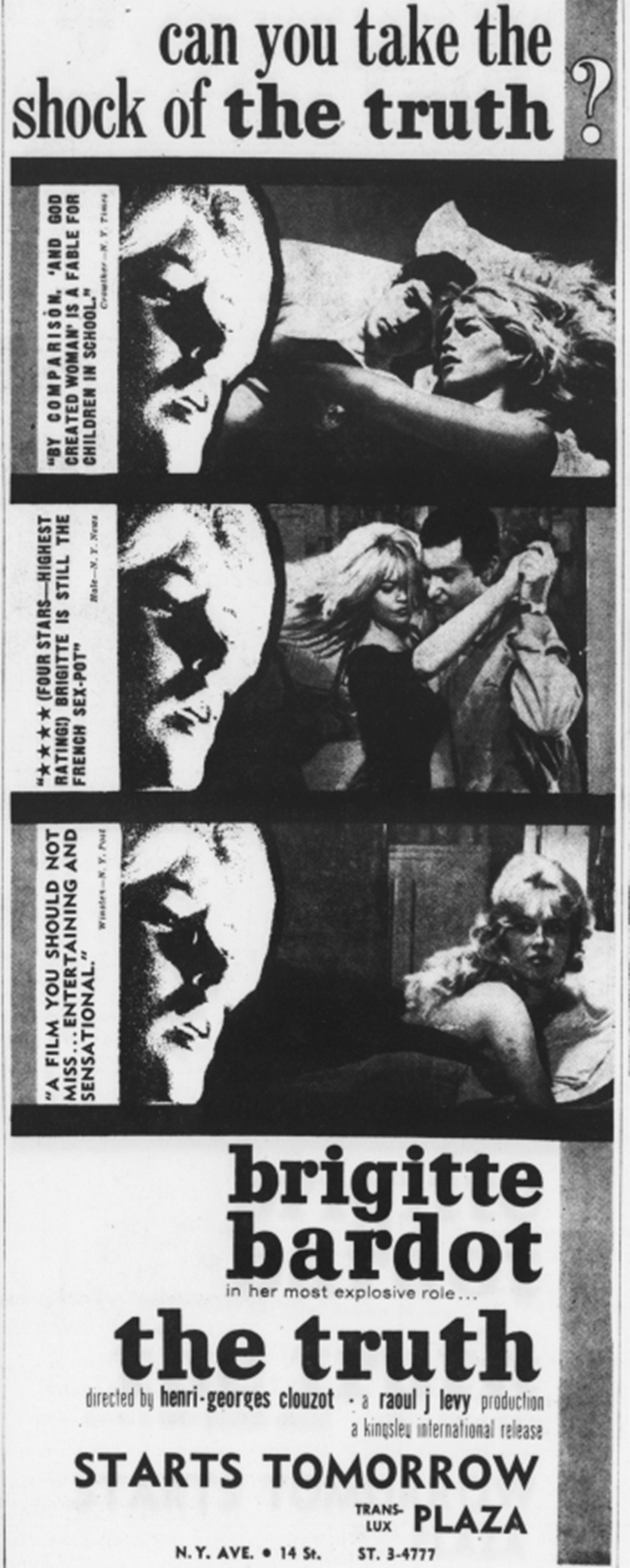
U.S theatrical advertisement, 1961.

Gilbert becomes infatuated with Dominique, though they are polar opposites in terms of values and personality. Eventually, they begin a turbulent relationship, during which Dominique takes an uncharacteristically long time to consent to Gilbert's sexual advances, impulsively sleeping around with other men in the meantime. Gilbert is jealous and frustrated but remains committed to Dominique. After they finally consummate their relationship, he proposes to her, but she refuses. They move in together, but their differing lifestyles lead to further contention, and Dominique cheats on him, after which he beats her. The landlady evicts Dominique from Gilbert's flat, leading her to take a job at a restaurant to pay her own rent. Gilbert becomes suspicious that Dominique is involved with the restaurant owner, Toussaint. This leads to an emotional breakup as Dominique insists nothing is going on with Toussaint while Gilbert refuses to believe her.

Dominique sleeps with Toussaint after the breakup, then quits her job and becomes homeless, turning to prostitution. While visiting her hometown for her father's funeral, she learns that Annie is now engaged to Gilbert. Dominique visits Gilbert, begging him to take her back. He accepts her advances and sleeps with her once more, then coldly turns her away the next morning. Dominique promptly steps in front of a bus, though she survives with minimal injury and denies that it was a suicide attempt. Later that day, Gilbert hastily finalizes his marriage vows to Annie. Dominique purchases a gun and sneaks back to Gilbert's apartment, initially claiming she intends to kill herself in front of him. As Gilbert berates and insults her, she turns the gun on him instead, emptying it into him and leaving her without a bullet to commit suicide. After the shooting, she breaks down sobbing then seemingly laughing. Her suicide attempt with the gas line is not shown until its aftermath.

Over the course of the trial, Dominique's defense attorney, Guerin, characterizes the killing as an impulsive crime of passion borne out of genuine love for Gilbert, while the prosecutor, Eparvier, attacks and condemns Dominique as manipulative and selfish, engineering the entire relationship and the eventual murder out of resentment towards Annie; Eparvier also calls into question the seriousness of Dominique's various suicide attempts. Dominique grows increasingly emotional over the course of the trial. Guerin adapts his defense strategy to portray Gilbert as the manipulator and Dominique as the victim; this finally drives Dominique to an outburst, insisting to the courtroom that she and Gilbert genuinely loved each other. That night, she attempts suicide again, slitting her wrist. This time she is successful, and the judge announces her death to the court the following day, dismissing the case. Despite their impassioned arguments during the trial, Eparvier and Guerin quickly resume their friendly rapport the moment the trial is over. Eparvier is slightly shaken by the suicide and expresses guilt over his own culpability, whereas Guerin is indifferent and reassures his colleague it is simply a "professional hazard" while turning his attention to the next case.

== Cast ==
- Brigitte Bardot as Dominique Marceau
- Charles Vanel as Maître Guérin
- Paul Meurisse as Maître Éparvier
- Sami Frey as Gilbert Tellier
- Marie-José Nat as Annie Marceau
- Louis Seigner as Le président des assises
- André Oumansky as Ludovic
- René Blancard as L'avocat général
- Fernand Ledoux as Le médecin légiste
- Claude Berri as Georges
- Jackie Sardou as The concierge
- Jean-Loup Reynold as Michel
- Marcel Cuvelier as Journalist

== Production ==
Jean-Paul Belmondo, Jean-Pierre Cassel, and Jean Louis Trintignant were all considered for the lead role – Trintignant was Bardot's choice – before Clouzot decided to go with Sami Frey.

Philippe Leroy-Beaulieu, one of the male leads, was fired during shooting. Leroy-Beaulieu then sued the producer for damages of 300,000 francs. Bardot's then-husband Jacques Charrier had a nervous breakdown, and was hospitalised for two months. Vera Clouzot had a nervous breakdown in July. In August, Clouzot had a heart attack, and filming was suspended for a week. Also, Bardot's secretary of four years sold secrets about her to the press.

During filming, Bardot had an affair with Sami Frey, which resulted in her breaking up with Jacques Charrier. In September 1960, Bardot had an argument with Charrier, and then attempted suicide by slashing her wrist. (Charrier had earlier attempted suicide himself.)

== Reception ==
=== Box office ===
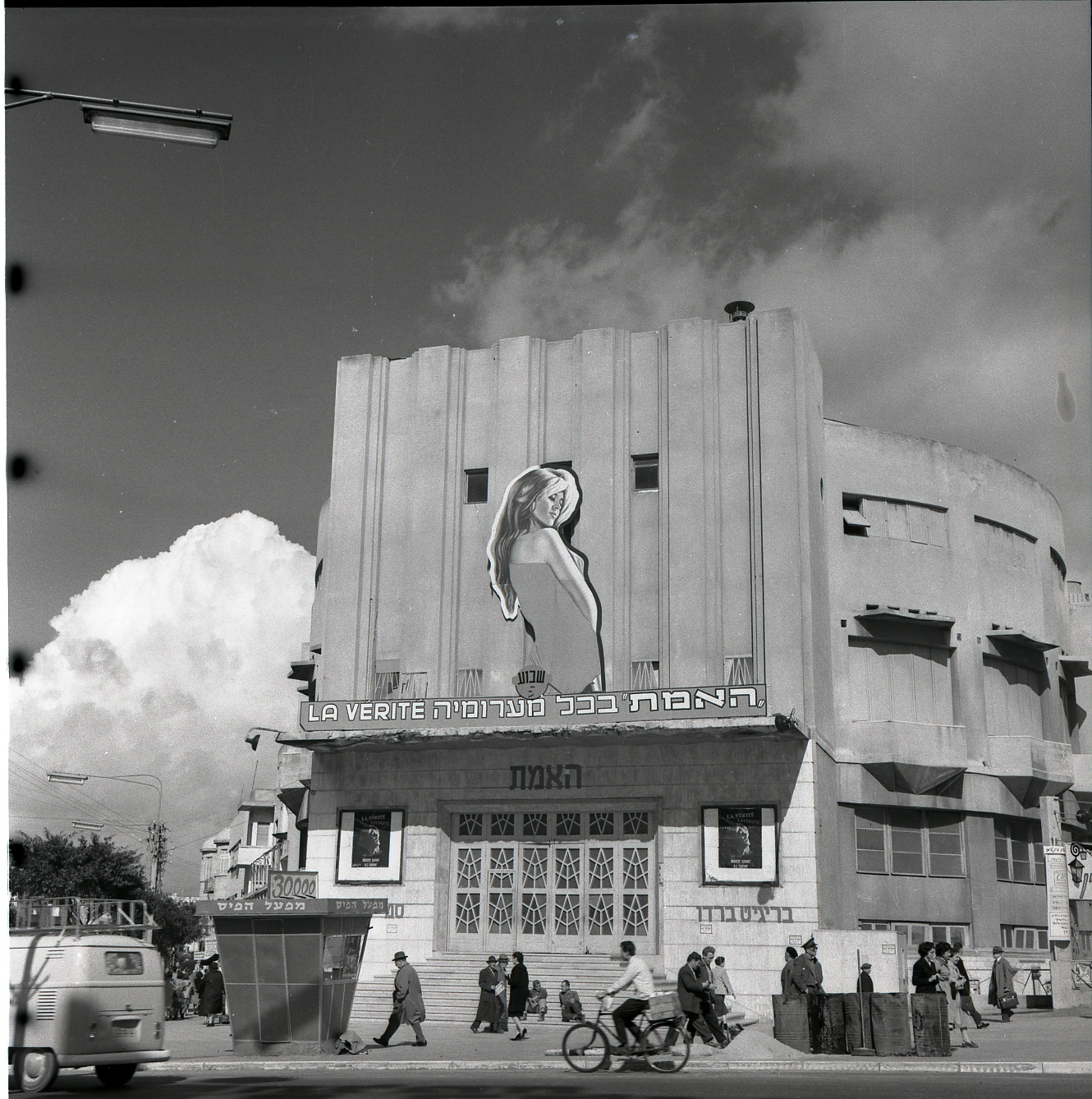
Showing at Tel Aviv's Mughrabi Theatre

In the words of The New York Times, "probably no film in recent years – at least in France – has been subjected to so much advance attention. Two years in the planning, six months in the shooting, sets sealed to the press, and all culminating in the suicide attempt of the drama's star, Brigitte Bardot. The public had been told that Clouzot was turning B. B. into a real actress."

The film was a massive box office hit in France, Bardot's biggest ever success at the box office, and the second most popular film of the year (after Ben Hur ). Films and Filming said it was the most popular foreign language film in Britain for the year ended 31 October 1962.

According to a 1963 report by CNC France, Bardot's two films, The Truth and A Very Private Affair, still generating a profit of $640,000 for the French film industry

=== Critical reception ===
La Vérité has an approval rating of 67% on review aggregator website Rotten Tomatoes, based on 6 reviews, and an average rating of 8.2/10.

The Los Angeles Times called the film "an amazing picture, a tour de force from all concerned. It is at once immoral, amoral, and strangely moral".

Filmink wrote "Bardot is tremendous – sexy, charismatic, believable as a spoilt sexpot and enraged woman. Her final scene is very moving."

== See also ==
- List of submissions to the 33rd Academy Awards for Best Foreign Language Film
- List of French submissions for the Academy Award for Best Foreign Language Film
