= A Very Private Affair =

1962 film by Louis Malle

- Theatrical release poster
- French: Vie privée
- Directed by: Louis Malle
- Written by: Jean-Paul Rappeneau; Louis Malle; Jean Ferry (adaptation)
- Produced by: Christine Gouze-Renal
- Starring: Brigitte Bardot; Marcello Mastroianni
- Cinematography: Henri Decaë
- Edited by: Kenout Peltier
- Music by: Fiorenzo Carpi
- Production companies: PROGEFI; CIPRA; CCM
- Distributed by: Consortium Pathé (France); Metro-Goldwyn-Mayer (Italy)
- Release dates: 31 January 1962 (France); 21 April 1962 (Italy)
- Running time: 103 minutes
- Countries: France; Italy
- Languages: French; Italian
- Box office: 1,879,668 admissions (France)

A Very Private Affair (French: Vie privée, lit. 'Private Life') is a 1962 romantic drama film co-written and directed by Louis Malle and starring Brigitte Bardot and Marcello Mastroianni.

== Plot ==
Jill is an 18-year-old French woman from an upper-class background who lives with her widowed mother in a luxurious villa on Lake Geneva and takes ballet lessons in Paris with her close friend Carla. Despite dating Dick, her ballet instructor, she is secretly infatuated with the older Fabio Rinaldi, an Italian magazine editor and theater director who is married to Carla. Dismayed by her unrequited love, Jill moves to Paris with Dick, despite her mother's protests, and pursues a career as a ballerina. However, she soon grows bored with Dick and ballet, and briefly turns to modeling to earn money.

After being discovered by film producer Maxime, Jill begins acting in films. Within three years, she becomes a world-famous sex symbol, although she faces intense media scrutiny for her many love affairs and is constantly hounded by paparazzi. While attending a premiere at Maxime's behest, Jill suffers a nervous breakdown after being mobbed by crazed fans and paparazzi. She is admitted to a clinic and shortly thereafter travels in secret to Geneva with her doctor, Juliette, to stay at her mother's villa, but she is not home. She then seeks out Fabio, who accompanies her back to her mother's villa and reveals that he has divorced Carla. As they enter the villa using a spare key, a horde of paparazzi who were tipped off by Juliette gather outside, distressing Jill.

The next day, Fabio smuggles Jill out of the villa and into his apartment. While he is at work, she attempts suicide by drowning herself in his bathtub, but he rushes to her rescue and nurses her back to health. They soon become lovers while hiding in Fabio's apartment before he leaves for Spoleto, Italy, where he is staging an open-air production of Heinrich von Kleist's play Das Käthchen von Heilbronn for the arts festival. In the meantime, Jill stays with her mother at the villa, which is surrounded by paparazzi. Maxime visits Jill, attempting to convince her to return to Paris, but when she expresses that she wants to quit acting, he threatens to sue her for breach of contract.

Evading the paparazzi, Jill travels to Spoleto and happily reunites with Fabio. She is not recognized in public at first, until she encounters a close friend named Alain, a paparazzo, who publishes a photograph of Jill and Fabio in the newspaper. Soon, rehearsals for the play are hindered by hordes of fans and paparazzi, prompting Fabio to ask Jill to stay in his hotel room. Enraged by the media circus surrounding Jill, Fabio throws out Alain and his friends while they are keeping Jill company and vows to protect her. In response, Alain and his colleagues besiege the nearby rooftops, eager to take pictures of Jill.

After Fabio transfers Jill to a higher room in the hotel, she quickly grows frustrated with having to stay alone in the room. On opening night, Fabio discourages Jill from attending the play, fearing her presence will cause an uproar, and she angrily accuses him of holding her captive. Shortly afterwards, Fabio calls Jill and pleads with her to come to the premiere, but she refuses. When Jill climbs out onto the rooftop to watch the play, she is spotted by Alain, who takes a picture of her. Startled by the flash of his camera, Jill loses her balance and falls to her death with a serene expression on her face.

== Cast ==
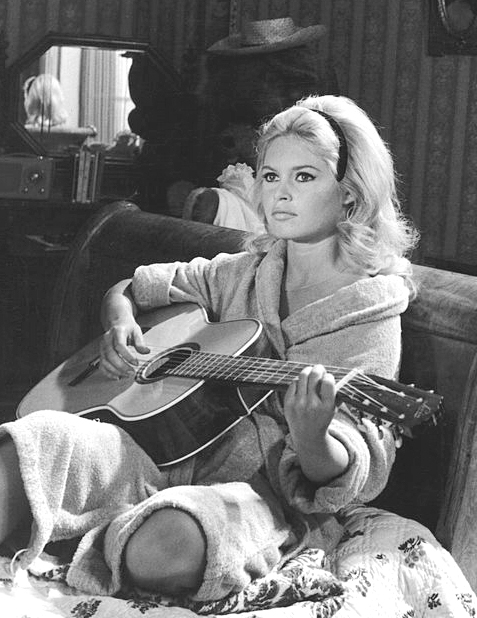
Brigitte Bardot in A Very Private Affair

- Brigitte Bardot as Jill
- Marcello Mastroianni as Fabio Rinaldi
- Nicolas Bataille as Edmond
- Jacqueline Doyen as Juliette
- Eléonore Hirt as Cécile
- Ursula Kubler as Carla
- Gregor von Rezzori as Gricha
- Antoine Roblot as Alain, a photographer
- Dirk Sanders as Dick
- Paul Sorèze as Maxime
- Gloria France as Anna

== Production ==
Principal photography took place from 10 June to 27 August 1961 in Paris, at the Franstudio in Saint-Maurice, Val-de-Marne, in Geneva, Perugia and Spoleto.

== Reception ==
=== Critical ===
Variety called it "elegantly produced."

=== Box office ===
According to a 1963 report by the Centre national de la cinématographie (CNC), Bardot's two films, The Truth and A Very Private Affair, still generating a profit of $640,000 for the French film industry

Variety said the film did "only so so" at the box office in the US.

== Soundtrack ==
- "Sidonie", sung by Brigitte Bardot
