= Don Juan, or If Don Juan Were a Woman =

- Theatrical release poster
- French: Don Juan ou Si Don Juan était une femme...
- Directed by: Roger Vadim
- Screenplay by: Roger Vadim; Jean Cau; Jean-Pierre Petrolacci
- Dialogue by: Jean Cau
- Starring: Brigitte Bardot; Robert Hossein; Mathieu Carrière; Michèle Sand; Robert Walker Jr.; Jane Birkin; Maurice Ronet
- Cinematography: Henri Decaë; Andréas Winding
- Edited by: Victoria Mercanton
- Music by: Michel Magne
- Production companies: Filmsonor; Les Films Marceau; Paradox Productions; Filmes Cinematografica
- Distributed by: Cocinor (France); Capitol International (Italy)
- Release dates: 22 February 1973 (France); 21 April 1973 (Italy)
- Running time: 90 minutes
- Countries: France; Italy
- Languages: French; Swedish; English
- Box office: 949,912 admissions (France)

Don Juan, or If Don Juan Were a Woman (French: Don Juan ou Si Don Juan était une femme...), also known as Ms. Don Juan in the UK-released English dub, is a 1973 erotic drama film directed by Roger Vadim. The film stars Brigitte Bardot in her fifth film directed by Vadim. Bardot had achieved international stardom when Vadim directed her in the 1956 film And God Created Woman.

== Plot ==
In France, Jeanne arrives at a funeral service to visit her cousin Paul, a priest. As Paul prays, he sees Jeanne. When the funeral is over, the two converse having not seen each other in a year, to which Jeanne confesses she has killed someone. Back at her residence, Jeanne talks with Léporella, her secretary, about inheriting her father's wealth after he died of a heart attack. She believes she is the reincarnation of Don Juan and prides herself in the destruction of men who have fallen for her charms. Shortly after, Léporella leaves and Paul arrives. He questions Jeanne's claim that she had murdered someone, to which she recounts the story.

At an archery competition, Jeanne and Paul watch Pierre Gonzagues, a magistrate, win the championship. Pierre drives Jeanne home where as a married man, he states he has had adulterous affairs. They have an affair, but he leaves while she is bathing. A week later, Jeanne is invited to a dinner by Pierre's wife, along with a playwright and his girlfriend. Three months later, she visits Pierre outside as he leaves his workplace. At Pierre's residence, Jeanne confesses her love towards him, but he declines to continue their affair.

Angered at his rejection, Jeanne schemes to trap Pierre in a scandal, in which she invites him to a secluded mansion on an island near Sweden. The two have a brief contentious argument, but days later, they subsequently party at a university. During an orgy, a brief fight occurs, in which a female blonde student is struck. Pierre is then photographed helping the student, which gets published in the French press. This causes a political scandal, and Pierre's wife divorces him.

Back in France, Pierre is nearly destitute. He enters a bar where he spots Jeanne whom he blames for ruining him. Jeanne then rides with Louis Prévost and his wife Clara. Later that night, Louis hosts a party at his suite. There, Clara discusses her marriage with Jeanne, in which Clara states Louis is a savage. Angered, Louis tosses Clara into an interior pool, upsetting Clara who runs upstairs. Afterwards, Jeanne accepts an invitation to London with Louis and Clara. On the train ride there, Jeanne and Clara form a romantic bond.

In London, Louis finds Jeanne and Clara in bed together, in which he hopes to engage in a ménage à trois. However, the two women dress together for a walk, but Louis orders them to stay. Jeanne spitefully tells Louis she was never interested in him, and instead wanted to possess him through Clara. In anger, Louis repeatedly slaps her. Jeanne briefly pauses on recounting her story, declining to reveal her true crime. Paul decides to leave until he learns Jeanne has locked the door from the inside. She and Paul fight over the house key, and Jeanne continues her story.

Jeanne then reflects on her relationship with the guitarist, whom she had spotted at Louis's party. After the nightclub closes, the guitarist continues to serenade Jeanne. Jeanne asks the guitarist if he will give up everything for her. He agrees, and the two consummate until she leaves. Depressed, the guitarist slits his wrists with broken glass. Jeanne calls the ambulance but the guitarist is dead.

Jeanne confesses her guilt, and she and Paul have sex. Jeanne meets with Léporella where she spots Pierre outside, wherein she arranges to meet with him tomorrow. Before Jeanne arrives, Pierre doses the floor with gasoline, and when she does, he ignites a fire. Pierre escapes, but Jeanne is burnt alive.

== Cast ==
- Brigitte Bardot as Jeanne
- Robert Hossein as Louis Prévost
- Mathieu Carrière as Paul
- Michèle Sand as Léporella
- Robert Walker Jr. as the guitarist
- Jane Birkin as Clara
- Maurice Ronet as Pierre Gonzagues

== Production ==
Vadim said in an interview after the film came out:

My attitude to women is accepted today in a way that it wasn't when I started out as director. But today women overreact – they pretend to be free on an intellectual and sexual level but because of our Christian traditions sex is always associated with guilt. Now however it's possible for a woman to have the same relationship with sex as a man – a man who is a lover can be a Don Juan whereas women like that were always considered whores or femmes faciles (easy women). But I think a woman can be free without being a whore. A female Don Juan can exist nowadays without a sense of guilt.

He later elaborated:

Don Juan is the end of a period – problems about love and sex, cruelty and romanticism on an aesthetic level – and I wanted to finish that period with Brigitte because I started with her as a director (And God Created Woman). Underneath what people call "the Bardot myth" was something interesting, even though she was never considered the most professional actress in the world. For years, since she has been growing older, and the Bardot myth has become just a souvenir, I wanted to work with Brigitte. I was curious in her as a woman and I had to get to the end of something with her, to get out of her and express many things I felt were in her. Brigitte always gave the impression of sexual freedom – she is a completely open and free person, without any aggression. So I gave her the part of a man – that amused me.

Vadim said he was attracted to the character of Don Juan was "the sense of defiance on every level. It's someone who refuses to be involved in any system. In the film it's a woman who defies men – and I do the film like the character – against all the rules." Vadim says he deliberately pulled back on the sex scenes. "I was interested in the idea of seduction, not what happened in bed – though I would love to make a documentary on how they fucked."

Jane Birkin plays the role of a woman who falls in love with Brigitte Bardot's character. "I accepted immediately just to be in bed with Bardot", said Birkin later. "She's the most utterly perfect woman. There's not a fault. God knows, I looked. Even her feet are pretty."

"If there's homosexuality between men, they have to be queer", said Vadim. "But women can have relationships with other women without being dykes. Brigitte seduced this girl to hit the man, and the girl is enchanted not to be treated as a sex object for once in her life."

"If Don Juan is not my last movie, it will be my next to last", said Bardot during filming.

== Reception ==
The film received poor reviews in France.

The Guardian wrote that the film "like so many of his [Vadim's] films, has some beautiful photography and slick editing but few plausible scenes. Incapable of creating an illusion, Vadim is eminently capable of creating an illusion of creativity." "It stinks" said another review for the same paper.

"I have seen as much passion, and almost as much flesh, at the Test match", wrote The Observer.

David Thomson, in his Biographical History of Film, felt that there was "awful sadness" in Bardot's appearance.

Filmink wrote "There’s a lot of drivel dialogue about the nature of men and women, and the ending, where Bardot burns to death, feels like the inevitable triumph of misogyny. Still, it’s kind of appropriate that this is how Bardot wrapped up her film career, i.e. being the best thing about a not particularly good movie."
