= Love on a Pillow =

- Directed by: Roger Vadim
- Screenplay by: Roger Vadim
- Based on: novel by Christiane Rochefort
- Starring: Brigitte Bardot; Robert Hossein
- Cinematography: Armand Thirard
- Music by: Michel Magne
- Release date: 1962
- Running time: 102 minute
- Country: France
- Language: French
- Box office: 2,872,723 admissions (France)

Love on a Pillow (Le Repos du guerrier) is a 1962 French film starring Brigitte Bardot and directed by Roger Vadim. It's based on the book called Le Repos du guerrier, written by Christiane Rochefort.

== Plot ==
Geneviève Le Theil is a financially independent woman in Paris engaged to Pierre.

She goes to Dijon to collect an inheritance. She enters the wrong hotel room and accidentally foils the suicide of a penniless alcoholic, Renaud, who has taken an overdose of sleeping pills.

Renaud seduces Geneviève and persuades her to take him with her to Paris. Once there she severs ties with her mother, her friends, and Pierre, despite Renaud treating her badly.

When Renaud picks up a prostitute, Genevieve leaves him. But then he proposes marriage and she accepts.

== Cast ==
- Brigitte Bardot as Geneviève Le Theil
- Robert Hossein as Renaud Sarti
- James Robertson Justice as Katov
- Macha Méril as Raphaele
- Yves Barsacq as Hotel manager
- Jacqueline Porel as Geneviève's mother
- Jean-Marc Bory as Pierre
- Christian Melsen as Police inspector
- Michel Serrault as Varange
- Robert Dalban as Police sergeant

== Reception ==
The film was a disappointment commercially in the US.

Variety said it "does not quite come off."
