= La Madrague (song) =

- Dutch release picture sleeve

Single by Brigitte Bardot
- Released: 1963
- Composer: Gérard Bourgeois
- Lyricist: Jean-Max Rivière

"La Madrague" is a French song written by Jean-Max Rivière and composed by Gérard Bourgeois. It was made famous by Brigitte Bardot in 1963, and was reportedly inspired by Bardot's house in Saint-Tropez.

== History ==
The song was sung for the first time by Bardot in 1963 on the television program Bonne année Brigitte, and remains one of her best known songs.

It was covered a number of times: in 2006 by Réunion group Zong; in 2009 by Camélia Jordana, and Marie France who sang it on September 28, 2009, Bardot's 75th birthday; and in 2010 by reality-TV personality Loana Petrucciani, who made a videoclip, claiming that Bardot had welcomed her to La Madrague. In response, Bernard d'Ormale, Bardot's husband, said this was not true and declared:

She needs to stop saying just anything to make people talk about her. Brigitte will never open the Madrague to Loana. Like Paris Hilton, she is one of the useless people. I don't understand why some media outlets are making a fuss about this.

— Bernard d'Ormale
