= Les Femmes =

1969 film by Jean Aurel

- French theatrical release poster
- Directed by: Jean Aurel
- Written by: Cécil Saint-Laurent; Jean Aurel
- Produced by: Raymond Danon
- Starring: Brigitte Bardot; Maurice Ronet
- Cinematography: Claude Lecomte
- Edited by: Anne-Marie Cotret
- Music by: Luis Fuentes Jr.
- Production companies: Lira Films; Ascot-Cineraid
- Distributed by: Prodis
- Release dates: 7 November 1969 (France); 21 January 1970 (Italy)
- Running time: 86 minutes
- Countries: France; Italy
- Language: French

Les Femmes (released in the United States as The Vixen) is a 1969 sex comedy film co-written and directed by Jean Aurel, starring Brigitte Bardot and Maurice Ronet. It recorded admissions of 505,292 in France.

== Cast ==
- Brigitte Bardot as Clara
- Maurice Ronet as Jérôme
- Christina Holme as Marianne
- Anny Duperey as Hélène
- Jean-Pierre Marielle as L'éditeur
- Tanya Lopert as Louise

== Production ==
The film marked a shift in Bardot's career from pictures aimed at the international market to movies more for the domestic market.

== Censorship ==
When Les Femmes was first released in Italy in 1970, the Committee for the Theatrical Review of the Italian Ministry of Cultural Heritage and Activities rated it as VM18: not suitable for children under 18. In order for the film to be screened publicly, the Committee imposed the following modifications: 1) Delete the naked scenes of Marianne lying in bed; 2) Reduce the sequence of the sexual intercourse between Jerome and Marianne who are naked; 3) Reduce the final sequence of the sexual intercourse between Jerome and Clare in order to avoid scenes in which she is naked and scenes of lustful caresses. The reason for the age restriction, cited in the official documents, is that: even after the cuts, the movie is still imbued with eroticism and it is inappropriate to the sensitivity of a minor. The official document number is: 55377, it was signed on 20 January 1970 by Minister Domenico Magrì.
