= Naughty Girl (film) =

1956 film by Michel Boisrond

- Theatrical release poster
- French: Cette sacrée gamine
- Directed by: Michel Boisrond
- Screenplay by: Roger Vadim
- Adaptation by: Roger Vadim; Michel Boisrond
- Based on: An idea by Jean Perine
- Produced by: Georges Sénamaud; Albert Mazaleyrat
- Starring: Brigitte Bardot; Jean Bretonnière; Françoise Fabian; Mischa Auer; Jean Poiret; Michel Serrault; Marcel Charvey; Jean Lefebvre; Bernard Lancret; Raymond Bussières; Darry Cowl
- Cinematography: Joseph Brun
- Edited by: Jacques Mavel
- Music by: Henri Crolla; Hubert Rostaing; René Denoncin
- Production companies: Les Films Lutétia; SLPF; SELB Films; SONODIS
- Distributed by: Sofradis
- Release date: 30 March 1956
- Running time: 86 minutes
- Country: France
- Language: French
- Box office: 4,040,634 admissions (France)

Naughty Girl (French: Cette sacrée gamine, lit. 'That Darn Girl'), also released as Mam'zelle Pigalle, is a 1956 French musical romantic comedy film directed by Michel Boisrond from a screenplay by Roger Vadim, starring Brigitte Bardot, Jean Bretonnière and Françoise Fabian. The film follows a Paris nightclub owner who, accused of dealing in counterfeit, entrusts his teenage daughter to the care of a friend, the headline singer at his establishment, after temporarily fleeing the country.

== Plot ==
In Paris, handsome singing star Jean Clery has recently become engaged to his psychoanalyst, Lili Rocher-Villedieu, and is the main attraction of Paul Latour's nightclub Mississippi in Pigalle, which is being used as a front for a counterfeit ring. When the police suspect Paul of being the ringleader, he travels to Switzerland to clear his name and discover who is framing him, entrusting his teenage daughter Brigitte—who belives that her father is a shipping magnate—to Jean's care in order to prevent her from becoming embroiled in the police investigation.

Jean collects Brigitte from her prestigious finishing school after helping her evade the police, who are looking for Paul, and hides her in his apartment. When Inspector Leduc pays a visit the next day, Jean passes Brigitte off as his maid. Leduc suspects that a man named Milord is involved in the ring, having found letters addressed to him at the Mississippi. Later, while at the Mississippi, Jean learns from his butler, Jérôme, by phone that Brigitte has accidentally set fire to his apartment while trying to iron his shirt. Jean rushes back home and consoles Brigitte as she tearfully apologizes to him.

One night, Jean goes out to dinner with Lili while Brigitte plays poker with Jérôme and his friends. When Jean and Lili go back to her place after dinner, he receives a call from Jérôme, who informs him that Brigitte has been arrested after insulting a few policemen while defending Jérôme's friends. Jean lies to Lili that he must visit an aunt at the hospital and rushes over to bail Brigitte out of jail. Jean reprimands Brigitte by slapping her, and she takes a stray parrot with her. Back at the apartment the next morning, Jean apologizes for slapping Brigitte.

Later that morning, as Jean sings and plays the piano, Brigitte sits beside him and they kiss before he pulls back, saying he loves his fiancée. Shortly afterwards, Lili arrives unexpectedly, worried about Jean's "aunt". Jean claims Brigitte is his younger sister, and Brigitte teases Jean by asking him to carry her back to her room in front of Lili, angering him. When Lili accuses Jean of lying, he explains the situation to her and denies being in love with Brigitte. Jean asks Jérôme to place a newspaper advertisement offering a reward for the owner of the parrot and leaves with Lili. A jealous Brigitte expresses her anger towards Lili.

At the Mississippi, where Jean is scheduled to perform that night, the club manager, Louis Dubreuil—who turns out to be ringleader Milord—sees Jean's newspaper advertisement regarding the parrot. Deducing that Paul has told Jean to place it as a secret code, Milord sends two henchmen to intercept a courier on his way to Jean's place to deliver forged notes. When the courier arrives at Jean's apartment, Brigitte and Jérôme are confused as the man leaves a suitcase and departs without taking the parrot. Shortly afterwards, Milord's henchmen arrive and knock out Jérôme before fleeing with the suitcase.

Brigitte and Jérôme follow the henchmen to the Mississippi, where the two overhear Milord instructing his henchmen to go after Jean. While Jérôme calls his friends for backup, Brigitte goes on stage and warns Jean that Louis is Milord and that his henchmen are after him. At the police station, Leduc sees a photo of Brigitte and recalls seeing her at Jean's place. Just as Paul arrives at Jean's apartment looking for Brigitte, the police show up and attempt to arrest Paul, who insists that Brigitte is in danger.

Back at the Mississippi, chaos erupts as Jean fends off the counterfeiters with the help of Jérôme and his friends. The police eventually arrive and arrest Milord and his cohorts, while Paul reunites with Brigitte. Some time later, Jean and Brigitte are married and have a baby, with Lili helping with the baby.

== Cast ==
- Brigitte Bardot as Brigitte Latour
- Jean Bretonnière as Jean Clery
- Françoise Fabian as Lili Rocher-Villedieu
- Mischa Auer as Igor
- Michel Serrault as Inspector Leduc
- Jean Poiret as Inspector Rémy
- Jean Lefebvre as a friend of Jérôme's
- Darry Cowl as the man with the suitcase
- Bernard Lancret as Paul Latour
- Marcel Charvey as Louis Dubreuil a.k.a. Milord
- Lucien Raimbourg as older Inspector Dupuis
- Robert Rollis as the first gendarme at the school
- Guy Henry as a henchman of Milord
- Mario David as Dédé, one of Milord's henchmen
- Madeleine Lambert as the headmistress
- Jacques Marin as the second gendarme at the school
- Joe Davray (credited as Jo Davray) as Jojo, a friend of Jérôme's
- Awazu as the Japanese tourist
- Raymond Bussières as Jérôme

== Production ==
According to Roger Vadim, producer Georges Sénamaud had mostly made B movies. Sénamaud had heard of a successful last-minute rewrite Vadim did on Julietta (1953) and asked Vadim to perform a similar function on this film, which had been sold to Italy, but whose script star Jean Bretonniere did not like. Vadim agreed provided his then-wife Brigitte Bardot was cast as the female lead and if Michel Boisrond, René Clair's first assistant director, would direct. Vadim later wrote "for the first time, Brigitte played a character written for her, in modern language; and she had a classically trained director who was making his first film." He called the film "the French equivalent of a Doris Day film, but with a bolder, more liberated edge."

Principal photography took place from 6 September to 5 November 1955 in and around Paris, including at the Francoeur Studios in Paris and at the Photosonor Studios in Courbevoie.

== Reception ==
=== Box office ===
Naughty Girl was a box-office success in France, being the 12th highest-grossing film of 1956. It was slightly more popular than And God Created Woman which Vadim directed later that year. FilmInk argued that "it's not hard to see why – that later film is more for adults while this is more a family picture, the sort of thing you could easily imagine Debbie Reynolds starring in at MGM or Sonja Henie in one of her films."

=== Critical response ===
Variety called it a "lighthearted comedy [that] benefits from an unpretentious production."

The Observer wrote that the director "has learnt the knack of raising a simple laugh, not yet the art of touching heart and mind." Geoffrey M. Warren of the Los Angeles Times praised the "tight, high speed direction."

Richard W. Nason of The New York Times wrote that the film:

Is full of slapstick and clumsy farce, and some oldish and splashy dance numbers. But it never piles up its effects in any one direction. Instead it keeps shifting key, from romance to melodrama to light comedy, back and forth. It presents nothing that can take the place of a serious study of Miss Bardot's form. ... The direction by Michael Boisrond seems rather fuzzy about whether or not Mam'zelle Pigalle should be a broad take-off on a Hollywood romantic melodrama. At the end, however, it seems this was the intention.
