= Louis de Funès filmography =

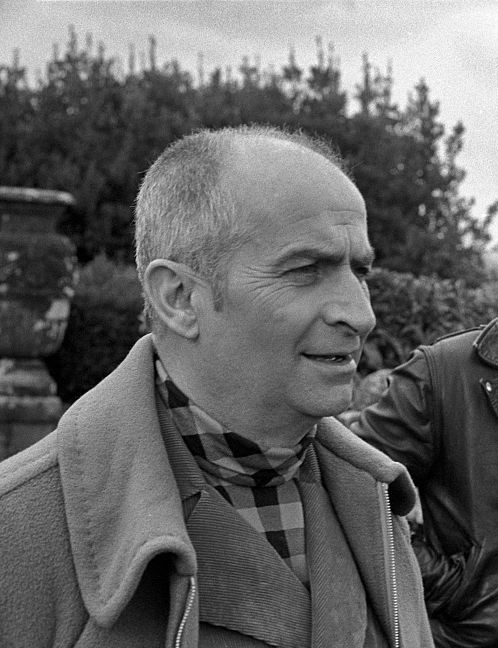
Image of Louis de Funès

Louis de Funès (31 July 1914 – 27 January 1983) was a French actor and comedian.

== Filmography ==
Louis de Funès made appearances in the following films.

1945–1964
Year	Title	Role	Director	Notes	
1945	The Temptation of Barbizon	Le portier du paradis	Jean Stelli	Uncredited	
1947	Six Hours to Lose	the driver	Alex Joffé and Jean Lévitte		
1947	Last Chance Castle	Bar Patron Hugging Yolande	Jean-Paul Paulin	Uncredited	
1947	Last Refuge	the driver	Alex Joffé		
1947	Antoine and Antoinette	Un garçon épicier / Un invité à la noce	Jacques Becker	Uncredited	
1948	Cruise for the Unknown One	Le cuisinier	Pierre Montazel	Uncredited	
1949	Du Guesclin	L'astrologue / Aymérigot Marches / un seigneur / un mendiant	Bernard de Latour		
1949	Mission in Tangier	Le colonel espagnol	André Hunebelle		
1949	I Like Only You	the orchestra's pianist	Pierre Montazel		
1949	Vient de paraître		Jacques Houssin	Uncredited	
1949	Millionaires for One Day	Philippe's solicitor	André Hunebelle		
1950	Clear the Ring	a spectator	Pierre Billon	Uncredited	
1950	Not Any Weekend for Our Love	Constantin, domestique du baron	Pierre Montazel		
1950	My Friend Sainfoin	the guide	Paul-Adrien Schaye		
1950	A Certain Mister	Thomas Boudeboeuf	Yves Ciampi		
1950	Bed for Two; Rendezvous with Luck	the waiter	Emil-Edwin Reinert		
1950	Adémaï au poteau-frontière	Soldier	Paul Colline	Uncredited	
1950	Father's Dilemma	Un prete	Alessandro Blasetti		
1950	His Last Twelve Hours	Nicolas	Luigi Zampa	Uncredited	
1950	Quay of Grenelle	Monsieur Vincent – le quincailler	Emil E. Reinert	Uncredited	
1950	The King of the Bla Bla Bla	Gino	Maurice Labro		
1950	Fugitive from Montreal		Jean Devaivre		
1950	Street Without a King	Hippolyte	Marcel Gibaud		
1950	The Gamblers	Piotr Petrovitch Spotniev	Claude Barma	TV movie	
1951	Bibi Fricotin	Le pêcheur	Marcel Blistène		
1951	Sweet Madness		Jean-Paul Paulin		
1951	The Straw Lover	Bruno	Gilles Grangier		
1951	Without Leaving an Address	a father-to-be in the hospital	Jean-Paul Le Chanois		
1951	The Red Rose	Manito	Marcello Pagliero		
1951	Dr. Knock	Le malade qui a perdu 100 grammes	Guy Lefranc	Uncredited	
1951	The Sleepwalker	Anatole	Maurice Labro		
1951	The Passerby	the lockmaster	Henri Calef		
1951	La vie est un jeu	Un voleur	Raymond Leboursier		
1951	They Were Five	Albert	Jack Pinoteau		
1951	The Voyage to America	un employee of Air France	Henri Lavorel		
1951	No Vacation for Mr. Mayor	the adviser	Maurice Labro		
1951	Le Dindon	the manager	Claude Barma		
1951	La poison	André Chevillard	Sacha Guitry		
1951	My Wife Is Formidable	a skier	André Hunebelle		
1951	A Love Under an Umbrella		Jean Laviron	Short, Uncredited	
1951	Jeanne avec nous	Claude Vermorel	Claude Vermorel	TV movie	
1951	Champions Juniors		Pierre Blondy	Short, Uncredited	
1951	Boîte à vendre		Claude André Lalande	Short, Uncredited	
1952	Wolves Hunt at Night	Waiter	Bernard Borderie	Uncredited	
1952	The Seven Deadly Sins	Martin Gaston, le Français	Yves Allégret	(segment "Paresse, La / Sloth")	
1952	Monsieur Leguignon, Signalman	Un habitant du quartier	Maurice Labro		
1952	Matrimonial Agency	Charles	Jean-Paul Le Chanois		
1952	Love Is Not a Sin	Monsieur Cottin	Claude Cariven		
1952	Judgement of God	an employee	Raymond Bernard	Uncredited	
1952	Je l'ai été trois fois	the sultan's interpreter	Sacha Guitry		
1952	Monsieur Taxi	Le peintre qui voit rouge	André Hunebelle		
1952	The Respectful Prostitute	the night club visitor	Charles Brabant		
1952	She and Me	the waiter	Guy Lefranc		
1952	Run Away Mr. Perle	Le fou qui pêche dans un lavabo	Pierre Gaspard-Huit		
1952	Le Huitième Art et la Manière	Le mari fan de radio	Maurice Regamey	Short	
1952	La jungle en folie		Claude André Lalande		
1953	Le Rire	Himself	Maurice Regamey		
1953	Tambour battant	Le maître d'armes	Georges Combret		
1953	The Virtuous Scoundrel	Émile	Sacha Guitry		
1953	The Long Teeth	an employee	Daniel Gélin		
1953	Au diable la vertu	Monsieur Lorette	Jean Laviron		
1953	The Tour of the Grand Dukes	Le directeur de l'hôtel	André Pellenc		
1953	The Sparrows of Paris	Doctor	Maurice Cloche		
1953	Les Compagnes de la nuit	Client	Ralph Habib	Uncredited	
1953	Innocents in Paris	Célestin	Gordon Parry		
1953	Capitaine Pantoufle	Monsieur Rachoux	Guy Lefranc		
1953	Dortoir des grandes	Monsieur Triboudot	Henri Decoin		
1953	Légère et court vêtue	Paul Duvernois	Jean Laviron		
1953	My Brother from Senegal	Doctor	Guy Lacourt		
1953	The Knight of the Night	Adrien Péréduray	Robert Darène		
1954	Huis clos		Jacqueline Audry		
1954	L'Étrange Désir de monsieur Bard	Monsieur Chanteau	Géza von Radványi		
1954	Le Blé en herbe	Le forain	Claude Autant-Lara		
1954	Les Intrigantes	Monsieur Marcange	Henri Decoin		
1954	Mam'zelle Nitouche	Un maréchal des logis	Yves Allégret		
1954	Tourments	Eddy Gorlier	Jacques Daniel-Norman		
1954	The Secret of Helene Marimon	Le jardinier Ravan	Henri Calef		
1954	Faites-moi confiance	Tumlatum	Gilles Grangier		
1954	The Pirates of the Bois de Boulogne	Le commissaire	Norbert Carbonnaux		
1954	Les hommes ne pensent qu'à ça	Monsieur Célosso	Yves Robert		
1954	The Sheep Has Five Legs	Pilate	Henri Verneuil		
1954	April Fools' Day	Le garde-champêtre	Gilles Grangier		
1954	Service Entrance	Cesare Grimaldi	Carlo Rim		
1954	Scènes de ménage	Monsieur Boulingrin	André Berthomieu		
1954	Ah! Les belles bacchantes	Michel Lebœuf	Jean Loubignac		Uncredited
1954	Queen Margot	René Bianchi	Jean Dréville		Uncredited
1954	Papa, Mama, the Maid and I	Monsieur Calomel	Jean-Paul Le Chanois		
1955	Ingrid – Die Geschichte eines Fotomodells	D'Arrigio	Géza von Radványi		
1955	The Babes Make the Law	Jeannot la Bonne Affaire	Raoul André		
1955	Napoléon	Soldier Laurent Passementier	Sacha Guitry	Uncredited	
1955	Frou-Frou	Colonel Cousinet-Duval	Augusto Genina		
1955	The Impossible Mr. Pipelet	Uncle Robert	André Hunebelle		
1955	Les Hussards	Luigi	Alex Joffé		
1955	A Girl Without Boundaries		Géza von Radványi		
1955	Papa, maman, ma femme et moi	Monsieur Calomel	Jean-Paul Le Chanois		
1956	Si Paris nous était conté	Antoine Allègre	Sacha Guitry		
1956	Bonjour sourire	Monsieur Bonoeil	Claude Sautet		
1956	La Bande à papa	L'inspecteur Victor Eugène Merlerin	Guy Lefranc		
1956	La Loi des rues	Paulo – les Chiens	Ralph Habib		
1956	Bébés à gogo	Monsieur Célestin Ratier	Paul Mesnier		
1956	Short Head	Prosper / Père Grazziani / Colonel Luc de la Frapinière / Le premier garçon de Turbolaria	Norbert Carbonnaux		
1956	La Traversée de Paris	Jambier	Claude Autant-Lara		
1957	Comme un cheveu sur la soupe	Pierre Cousin	Maurice Regamey		
1958	Neither Seen Nor Recognized	Léon Blaireau	Yves Robert		
1958	Life Together	Maître Stéphane, le notaire	Clément Duhour		
1958	Taxi, Roulotte et Corrida	Maurice Berger	André Hunebelle		
1959	Toto in Madrid	Prof. Francisco Montiel	Stefano Vanzina		
1959	The Overtaxed	Hector "Ettore" Curto	Stefano Vanzina		
1959	Mon pote le gitan	Monsieur Védrines	François Gir		
1960	Certains l'aiment froide	Ange Galopin	Jean Bastia		
1960	Candide ou l'optimisme au XX^{e} siècle	Gestapo officer	Norbert Carbonnaux		
1960	Les Tortillards	Emile Durand	Jean Bastia		
1961	Captain Fracasse	Scapin	Pierre Gaspard-Huit		
1961	La Belle Américaine	Viralot	Robert Dhéry		
1961	Dans l'eau qui fait des bulles	Paul Ernzer	Maurice Delbez		
1962	The Seven Deadly Sins		(several)		
1962	La Vendetta	Valentino Amoretti	Jean Chérasse		
1962	Le Crime ne paie pas	Le barman du 'Blue Bar'	Gérard Oury	(segment "L'homme de l'avenue")	
1962	The Devil and the Ten Commandments	Antoine Vaillant	Julien Duvivier	(segment "Bien d'autrui ne prendras")	
1962	The Gentleman from Epsom	Gaspard Ripeux	Gilles Grangier		
1962	Moonlight in Maubeuge		Jean Chérasse	Uncredited	
1962	We Will Go to Deauville	Ludovic Lambersac	Francis Rigaud		
1963	People in Luck	Antoine Beaurepaire	Philippe de Broca and Jean Girault	(segment "Un gros lot")	
1963	Carom Shots	Norbert Charolais	Marcel Bluwal		
1963	Pouic-Pouic	Léonard Monestier	Jean Girault		
1964	Let's Rob the Bank	Victor Garnier	Jean Girault		
1964	Salad by the Roots	Jack	Georges Lautner		
1964	Une souris chez les hommes	Marcel Ravelais	Jacques Poitrenaud		

1964–1982
Year	Title	Role	Director	Co-starring	Notes
1964	Le gendarme de Saint-Tropez	Maréchal des logis-chef Ludovic Cruchot	Jean Girault		
1964	Fantômas	Commissioner Juve	André Hunebelle	Jean Marais, Mylène Demongeot	
1965	The Sucker	Léopold Saroyan	Gérard Oury	Bourvil	
1965	How to Keep the Red Lamp Burning	Léon Haudepin	Gilles Grangier and Georges Lautner	Mireille Darc	(segment "Bons vivants, Les")
1965	Le gendarme à New York	Maréchal des logis-chef Ludovic Cruchot	Jean Girault		
1965	Fantômas se déchaîne	Commissioner Juve	André Hunebelle	Jean Marais, Mylène Demongeot	
1966	The Big Restaurant	Monsieur Septime	Jacques Besnard		
1966	La Grande Vadrouille	Stanislas Lefort	Gérard Oury	Bourvil, Terry-Thomas	
1967	Fantômas contre Scotland Yard	Commissioner Juve	André Hunebelle	Jean Marais, Mylène Demongeot	
1967	Oscar	Bertrand Barnier	Édouard Molinaro		
1967	Les Grandes Vacances	Charles Bosquier	Jean Girault		
1968	The Little Bather	Louis-Philippe Fourchaume	Robert Dhéry		
1968	Le tatoué	Félicien Mézeray	Denys de La Patellière	Jean Gabin	
1968	Le Gendarme se marie	Maréchal des Logis-chef Ludovic Cruchot	Jean Girault		
1969	Hibernatus	Hubert Barrère de Tartas	Édouard Molinaro		
1970	L'homme orchestre	Monsieur Edouard	Serge Korber		
1970	Le gendarme en balade	Maréchal des logis-chef Ludovic Cruchot	Jean Girault		
1971	Perched on a Tree	Henri Roubier	Serge Korber	Geraldine Chaplin	
1971	Jo	Antoine Brisebard	Jean Girault		
1971	Delusions of Grandeur	Don Salluste de Bazan	Gérard Oury	Yves Montand	
1973	The Mad Adventures of Rabbi Jacob	Victor Pivert	Gérard Oury		
1976	The Wing or the Thigh	Charles Duchemin	Claude Zidi	Coluche	
1978	La Zizanie	Guillaume Daubray-Lacaze	Claude Zidi	Annie Girardot	
1979	The Gendarme and the Extra-Terrestrials	Ludovic Cruchot	Jean Girault		
1980	L'avare	Harpagon	Louis de Funès and Jean Girault		
1981	La Soupe aux choux	Claude Ratinier	Jean Girault		
1982	Le Gendarme et les Gendarmettes	Maréchal des Logis-chef Ludovic Cruchot	Jean Girault and Tony Aboyantz		(final film role)
