= The Gendarme =

French comedy film series

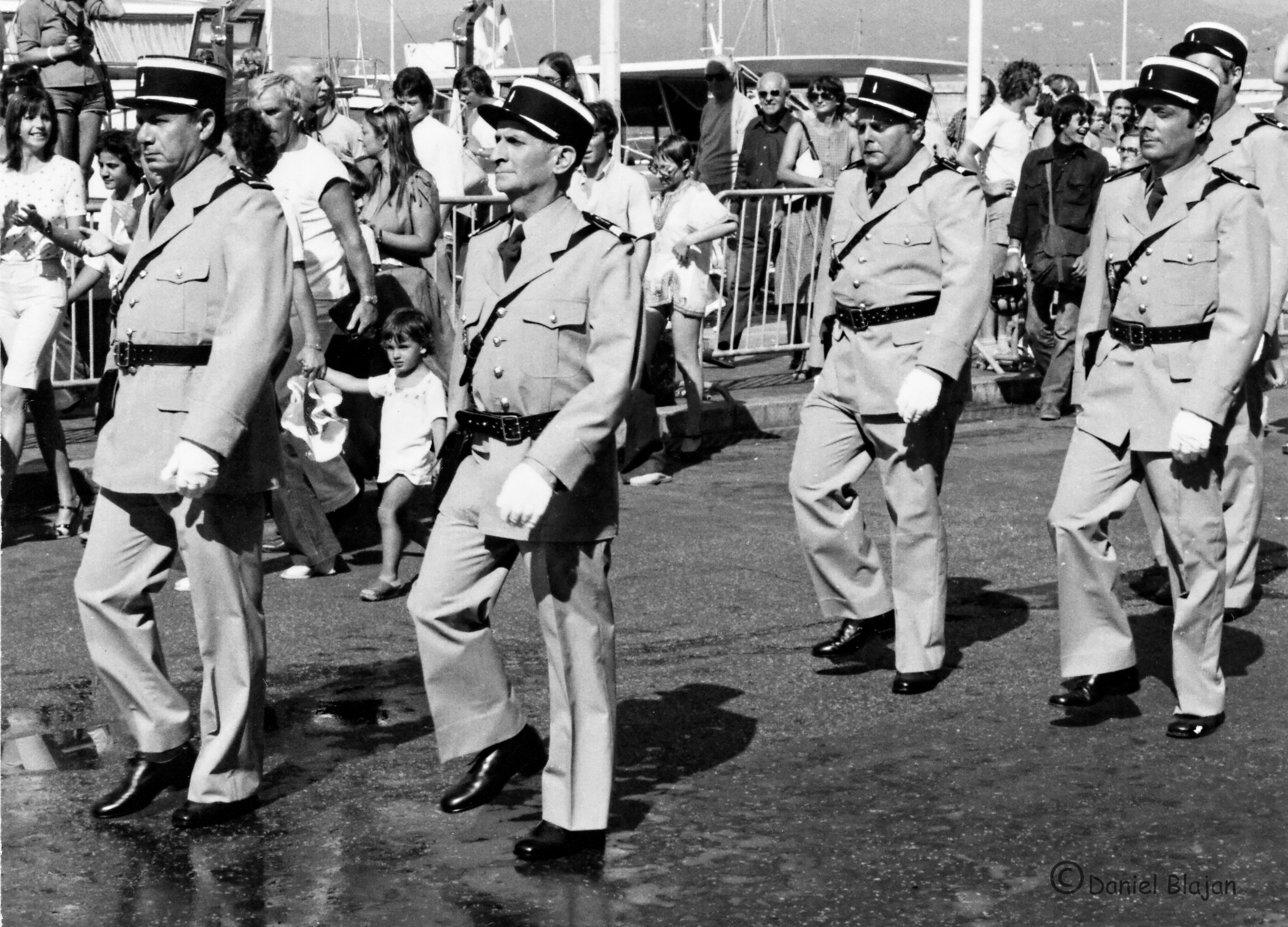
- Directed by: Jean Girault
- Written by: Richard Balducci; Jacques Vilfrid; Jean Girault
- Produced by: Gérard Beytout
- Starring: Louis de Funès; Michel Galabru; Jean Lefebvre; Geneviève Grad; Christian Marin; Guy Grosso; Michel Modo; Maurice Risch
- Music by: Raymond Lefèvre
- Distributed by: Société nouvelle de cinématographie (1964–2010); Groupe M6 (2010–present)
- Country: France
- Language: French

The Gendarme series is a series of six French comedy films set in Saint-Tropez, a fashionable resort on the French Riviera. All six films revolve around the main character of Ludovic Cruchot, played by the French actor and comedian Louis de Funès. Cruchot is an over-zealous officer of the French gendarmerie who repeatedly finds himself in the middle of a crisis, with Cruchot and the gendarmes being the best hope to solve it.

The first film in the series – The Troops of St. Tropez – was released in 1964, spawning five sequels. The last sequel was released in 1982.

The series never had an official title, but all film titles in the French language begin with the word "Le gendarme". The titles sometimes vary in different languages. For example, the first film in the series sometimes uses the English language title The Troops of St. Tropez and sometimes the title The Gendarme of Saint-Tropez.

Only Louis de Funès, Michel Galabru, Guy Grosso, Michel Modo and France Rumilly played in all six films of the series.

The Troops of St. Tropez was the most successful French cinema release in 1964 and the series enjoyed enormous global success.

== Films ==
The Gendarme series consists of six films (original French title):

- The Troops of St. Tropez (Le Gendarme de Saint-Tropez), 1964;
- The Gendarme in New York (Le Gendarme à New York), 1965;
- The Gendarme Gets Married (Le Gendarme se marie), 1968;
- The Gendarme Takes Off (Le Gendarme en balade), 1970;
- The Gendarme and the Extra-Terrestrials (Le Gendarme et les Extraterrestres), 1979;
- The Gendarme and the Gendarmettes (Le Gendarme et les Gendarmettes), 1982.

Further films were planned, including a possible seventh film about the gendarmes travelling back in time to meet Napoleon Bonaparte. However, the death of Louis de Funès in 1983 spelled the end to the series.

== Cast ==
=== The gendarmes ===
	The Troops of St. Tropez (1964)	The Gendarme in New York (1965)	The Gendarme Gets Married (1968)	The Gendarme Takes Off (1970)	The Gendarme and the Extra-Terrestrials (1979)	The Gendarme and the Gendarmettes (1982)
Ludovic Cruchot	Louis de Funès					
Jérôme Gerber	Michel Galabru					
Gaston Tricart	Guy Grosso					
Jules Berlicot	Michel Modo					
Lucien Fougasse	Jean Lefebvre					
Albert Merlot	Christian Marin					
Beaupied					Maurice Risch	
Taupin					Jean-Pierre Rambal	
Perlin						Patrick Préjean

=== Other characters ===
	The Troops of St. Tropez (1964)	The Gendarme in New York (1965)	The Gendarme Gets Married (1968)	The Gendarme Takes Off (1970)	The Gendarme and the Extra-Terrestrials (1979)	The Gendarme and the Gendarmettes (1982)
sister Clotilde	France Rumilly					
Josépha Cruchot			Claude Gensac		Maria Mauban	Claude Gensac
Nicole Cruchot	Geneviève Grad					
Mrs Gerber	Nicole Vervil	Viviane Méry	Nicole Vervil		Micheline Bourday	
Le colonel			Yves Vincent		Jacques François	
Jean-Luc	Patrice Laffont					
Eddie	Jean-Pierre Bertrand					
Berthier			René Berthier			
Christine Rocourt						Catherine Serre
Marianne Bonnet						Babeth Étienne
Isabelle Leroy						Sophie Michaud
Yo Macumba						Nicaise Jean-Louis

== International popularity ==
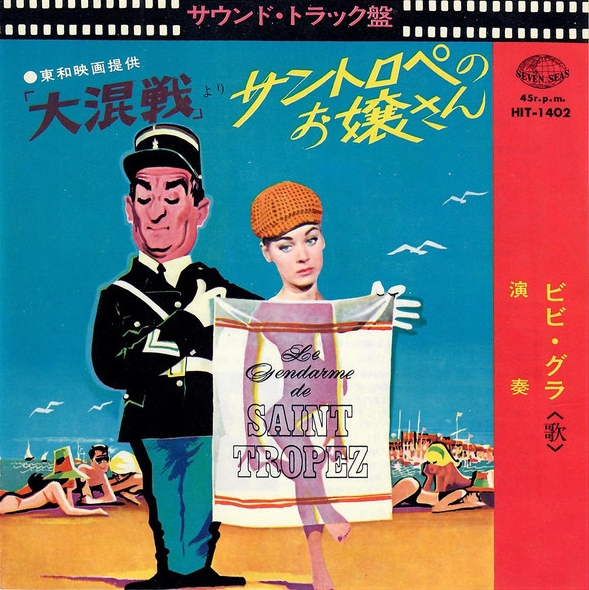
The original music single with The Gendarme theme song, released in Japan in 1967

The Gendarme series enjoyed enormous popularity in France, where The Troops of St.Tropez was the most successful cinema release of 1964 with box office attendance of 7.8 million. It was also popular across continental Europe, with significant box office success in certain countries such as Spain and the Soviet Union.

At the height of the series popularity, The Gendarme and the Extra-Terrestrials attracted 6.3 million cinema audiences in France, 5.1 million in West Germany and 35.3 million in the Soviet Union.

The films also enjoyed great popularity outside Europe, from Francophone Canada to Japan, but the series remained largely unknown in the United States and the United Kingdom.

== Legacy ==
=== Books ===
- Philippe Pessay, Les Aventures du gendarme de Saint-Tropez, Anvers, Walter Beckers / Solar, coll. «Ciné Club», 1969, 254 pages. (ISBN 978-2-26-316480-4). A novel based on the first four films in the series.
- Sylvain Raggianti, Le Gendarme de Saint-Tropez: Louis de Funès, histoire d'une saga, Paris, Flammarion, 2007, 176 pages. (ISBN 978-2-08-120327-3). A book that traces the saga of Louis de Funes and the gendarme series.
- Ellen Schafer, 50e anniversaire: La saga des Gendarmes, un panorama des archives SNC, Groupe M6, Société nouvelle de cinématographie, 2014, 52 pages. A book with photos and documents from the SNC archives.

=== Film documentaries ===
- 2005: Jean-Paul Girbal, La saga des gendarmes, 52 minutes, SNC / M6 Vidéo.
- 2014: Jérôme Wybon, Louis de Funès et les gendarmes, Paris Première.

=== Museum ===
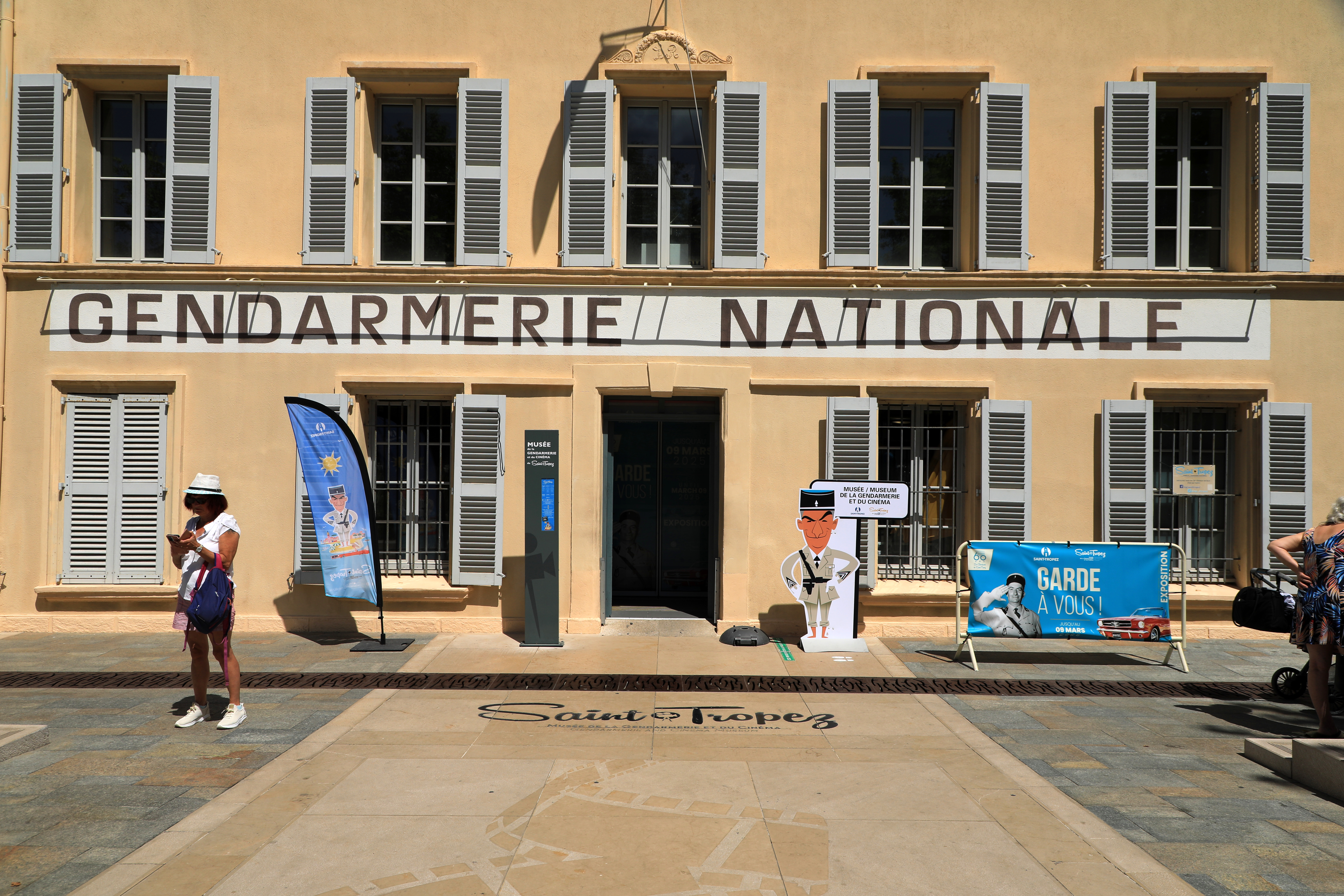
Old gendarmerie headquarters turned into a museum in Saint-Tropez

A museum dedicated to the gendarmerie and cinema in Saint-Tropez – Musée de la Gendarmerie et du Cinema de Saint-Tropez – has been in operation since 2016.

The museum is located in the building that housed the real Saint-Tropez gendarmerie from 1879 until 2003. The museum exhibits are largely dedicated to the Gendarme series as well as other films made in Saint-Tropez, including And God Created Woman which starred Brigitte Bardot. In 2024, the museum celebrated the 60th anniversary of The Troops of St. Tropez with a special temporary exhibition.
