= A Strange Kind of Colonel =

- Directed by: Jean Girault
- Written by: Jacques Vilfrid
- Starring: Jean Lefebvre; Jean Yanne; Pascale Roberts
- Cinematography: Willy Faktorovitch
- Edited by: Jean-Michel Gautier
- Music by: Raymond Lefevre
- Production companies: Les Productions Belles Rives; Société Nouvelle de Cinématographie
- Distributed by: Société Nouvelle de Cinématographie
- Release date: 24 April 1968
- Running time: 86 minutes
- Country: France
- Language: French

A Strange Kind of Colonel (French:Un drôle de colonel) is a 1968 French comedy film directed by Jean Girault and starring Jean Lefebvre, Jean Yanne and Pascale Roberts.

== Cast ==
- Jean Lefebvre as Cutterfeet
- Jean Yanne as Barton
- Pascale Roberts as Marina
- Jean Le Poulain as Le pasteur
- Jacques Dynam as Le policeman / Policeman
- Henri Virlojeux as Le savant / Trilby Beach
- Pierre Tornade as Un inspecteur
- Florence Blot as Hortense Tito
- Françoise Girault as Terry
- Jean Valmont as Smith
- Michel Galabru as Le colonel
- Maria Pacôme as Aurélia
- Michel Ardan as Le journaliste
- Yves Barsacq as Le patron du pub
- Robert Rollis as Le cireur

== Bibliography ==
- Philippe Rège. Encyclopedia of French Film Directors, Volume 1. Scarecrow Press, 2009.
