= Tony Aboyantz =

Soviet Armenian-born French film director and assistant director (1928–1992)

- Born: 21 January 1928; Krasnodar, North Caucasus Krai, Russian SFSR, Soviet Union
- Died: 10 November 1992 (aged 64); Paris, France
- Occupation: Film director
- Years active: 1950–1988

Tony Aboyantz (21 January 1928 – 10 November 1992) was a Soviet Armenian-born French film director and assistant director.

== Filmography ==
=== Director ===
- 1982: Le gendarme et les gendarmettes (Jean Girault died during filming which was completed by Tony Aboyantz)

=== Assistant director / first assistant director ===
- 1950: La ronde with Max Ophüls
- 1951: Le Plaisir with Max Ophüls
- 1952: Les plaisirs de Paris with Ralph Baum
- 1953: Before the Deluge with André Cayatte
- 1955: Lola Montès with Max Ophüls (Tony Aboyantz is also assistant producer)
- 1955: Marianne of My Youth with Julien Duvivier
- 1958: Rafles sur la ville with Pierre Chenal
- 1959: La Bête à l'affût with Pierre Chenal
- 1960: Les Scélérats with Robert Hossein
- 1961: The Game of Truth with Robert Hossein
- 1961: Le Goût de la violence with Robert Hossein
- 1961: La Belle Américaine with Robert Dhéry and Pierre Tchernia
- 1962: The Devil and the Ten Commandments with Julien Duvivier
- 1963: Angélique, Marquise des Anges with Bernard Borderie
- 1964: L'Inconnue de Hong Kong with Jacques Poitrenaud
- 1965: Marvelous Angelique with Bernard Borderie
- 1965: Gendarme in New York with Jean Girault
- 1966: Angelique and the King with Bernard Borderie
- 1967: Les grandes vacances with Jean Girault
- 1967: I Killed Rasputin with Robert Hossein
- 1968: Le gendarme se marie with Jean Girault
- 1969: Le gendarme en balade with Jean Girault
- 1970: Le Cri du cormoran le soir au-dessus des jonques, with Michel Audiard
- 1971: Jo with Jean Girault
- 1971: Le drapeau noir flotte sur la marmite with Michel Audiard
- 1972: Les Charlots font l'Espagne with Jean Girault
- 1973: Le Concierge with Jean Girault
- 1973: Le Permis de conduire with Jean Girault
- 1973: Le Magnifique with Philippe de Broca
- 1974: Deux grandes filles dans un pyjama with Jean Girault
- 1976: L'Année sainte with Jean Girault
- 1977: Madame Rosa with Moshé Mizrahi
- 1978: The Witness with Jean-Pierre Mocky
- 1979: La Gueule de l'autre with Pierre Tchernia
- 1979: Chère inconnue / Je t'écrirai une lettre d'amour with Moshé Mizrahi
- 1982: Le Choc with Robin Davis
- 1985: Le téléphone sonne toujours deux fois!! with Jean-Pierre Vergne
- 1988: Mangeclous with Moshé Mizrahi
