= Claude Gensac =

French actress (1927–2016)

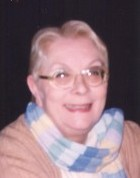
- Claude Gensac in 1993
- Born: 1 March 1927; Acy-en-Multien, French Third Republic
- Died: 27 December 2016 (aged 89); Suresnes, France
- Occupation: Actress
- Years active: 1952–2016
- Notable work: Oscar; Les grandes vacances Le gendarme se marie Jo

Claude Gensac (1 March 1927 – 27 December 2016) was a French actress. She appeared in more than 70 films and television productions since 1952. Gensac is the oldest nominee to date in the category César Award for Best Supporting Actress, nominated in 2015 for her role as Marthe in the film Lulu femme nue.

== Career ==
In 1952, Gensac portrayed the character of Evelyne in her first feature film, La Vie d'un homme honnête. She collaborated on a number of films with Louis de Funès, often playing his wife, to international acclaim. She appeared in the series of movies "The Gendarme" with Louis de Funès as his wife, Josepha Cruchot.

After De Funès's death in 1983, Gensac was rarely involved in film, but was active as a theater actress. In 2001 she returned to film in the French version of Absolutely Fabulous, her first film role since 1983. Gensac appeared in over 100 cinema and television films, as well as numerous theater roles. In 2011 she was awarded the Ordre des Arts et des Lettres at the officer grade.

== Personal life ==
Claude Gensac was married twice: from 1952 to 1954 with the actor Pierre Mondy and from 1958 to 1977 with Henri Chemin, a racer and PR Manager of Ford France with whom she had a son. She died in her sleep on 27 December 2016. She was 89 years old.

== Filmography ==
Year	Title	Role	Director	Notes
1953	La Vie d'un honnête homme	Evelyne	Sacha Guitry	
1958	Monsieur de Saint-Germain	Gloria	Philippe Ducrest	TV movie
1958	Adélaïde	Madame Elisabeth	Philippe Ducrest (2)	TV movie
1959	Coquin de printemps	Anatoline	André Leroux	TV movie
1959	La caméra explore le temps	Mme de Montespan / La comtesse Platen / Marie-Louise	Stellio Lorenzi	TV series (3 episodes)
1960	La terre est ronde	Faustina	Philippe Ducrest (3)	TV movie
1962	L'inspecteur Leclerc enquête	Caroline	Jean Laviron	TV series (1 episode)
1963	L'esprit et la lettre	The Marquise of Pommeray	Pierre Cardinal	TV movie
1964	Les Cinq Dernières Minutes	Françoise Vérac	Bernard Hecht	TV series (1 episode)
1964	Comment épouser un premier ministre	Madame Grandbourg	Michel Boisrond	
1964	Christine ou La pluie sur la mer	Hélène	Maurice Chateau	TV movie
1965	A Woman in White	Mlle Virolleau	Claude Autant-Lara	
1965	Le legs	The Countess	Jean-Paul Sassy	TV movie
1966	The Sultans	Marcelle	Jean Delannoy	
1967	Oscar	Germaine Barnier	Édouard Molinaro	
1967	Les grandes vacances	Isabelle Bosquier	Jean Girault	
1967	The Flashing Blade	Mireille	Yannick Andréi	TV series (12 episodes)
1968	Le gendarme se marie	Josépha Cruchot	Jean Girault (2)	
1969	Hibernatus	Edmée de Tartas	Édouard Molinaro (2)	
1970	The Ball of Count Orgel	Mademoiselle d'Orgel	Marc Allégret	
1970	Le gendarme en balade	Josépha Cruchot	Jean Girault (3)	
1971	Jo	Sylvie Brisebard	Jean Girault (4)	
1973	La dame de trèfle	Madame Prascovic	Pierre Cavassilas	TV movie
1974	Le plumard en folie	Adrienne	Jacques Lemoine	
1975	Au théâtre ce soir	Various	Pierre Sabbagh	TV series (2 episodes)
1976	La folle de Chaillot	Constance	Gérard Vergez	TV movie
1976	The Wing or the Thigh	Marguerite	Claude Zidi	
1976	Le chasseur de chez Maxim's	Germaine	Claude Vital	
1977	Moi, fleur bleue	School headmaster	Éric Le Hung	
1977	Les folies Offenbach	Céleste Baroche	Michel Boisrond (2)	TV mini-series
1978	Gaston Phébus	The Queen	Bernard Borderie	TV mini-series
1978	Au théâtre ce soir	Madeleine	Pierre Sabbagh (2)	TV series (1 episode)
1980	L'avare	Frosine	Louis de Funès & Jean Girault (5)	
1980	Georges Dandin	Madame de Sotenville	Yves-André Hubert	TV movie
1981	La Soupe aux choux	Amelie Poulangeard	Jean Girault (6)	
1981	Les fugitifs	Madame Levroux	Freddy Charles	TV movie
1981	Les fiancées de l'empire	Madame de Croissy	Jacques Doniol-Valcroze	TV mini-series
1981	Les amours des années grises	Madame de Mirval	Gérard Espinasse	TV series (1 episode)
1981	Au théâtre ce soir	Fernande	Pierre Sabbagh (3)	TV series (1 episode)
1982	Le gendarme et les gendarmettes	Josépha Cruchot	Tony Aboyantz & Jean Girault (7)	
1982	Au théâtre ce soir	Simone	Pierre Sabbagh (4)	TV series (1 episode)
1984	Amphitryon 38	Ecclisé	Claude Barma	TV movie
1984	Le sexe faible	Isabelle	Lazare Iglesis	TV movie
1984	Au théâtre ce soir	The Countess	Pierre Sabbagh (5)	TV series (1 episode)
1984	Le gendarme et l'empereur	Josépha Cruchot	Tony Aboyantz	
1985	Les amours des années 50	Baroness	Philippe Galardi	TV series (1 episode)
1985	Le gaffeur	Lucienne	Serge Pénard	
1985	Le crime de Mathilde		Jean-Paul Carrère	TV mini-series
1986	Madame et ses flics		Roland-Bernard	TV series (2 episodes)
1986	Le dindon	Clotilde Pontignac	Pierre Badel	TV movie
1986	L'étiquette	Gabrielle Caporet	André Flédérick	TV movie
1987	Cloud Waltzing	Madame Hibbert	Gordon Flemyng	TV movie
1987	Poule et frites	Françoise	Luis Rego	
1987–1991	Marc et Sophie	Grenelle	Jean-Pierre Prévost, Georges Bensoussan, ...	TV series (6 episodes)
1991	Quiproquos!	Alice Girardon	Claude Vital (2)	TV movie
1992	Tout ou presque		Claude Vital (3)	TV movie
1994	Tout feu, tout femme	Henriette	Marion Sarraut & Pierre Sisser	TV series (1 episode)
1998	Changement de cap	Dora	Patrick Malakian	TV movie
2001	Absolutely Fabulous	Mamie Mousson	Gabriel Aghion	
2003	Le Squat		Jean-Pierre Dravel, Olivier Macé, ...	TV movie
2003	Un été de canicule	Mamette	Sébastien Grall	TV mini-series
2003	Docteur Claire Bellac	Madame Lherminier	Denis Malleval	TV series (2 episodes)
2004	Le grand patron	Rose	Claudio Tonetti	TV series (1 episode)
2005	Papa est formidable	Paulette	Dominique Baron	TV movie
2005	Vénus & Apollon	Mouche	Pascal Lahmani	TV series (1 episode)
2005	Sous le soleil	Aunt Clarissa	Christian Vandelet & Alain Smitti	TV series (4 episodes)
2007	La prophétie d'Avignon	Odette Esperanza	David Delrieux	TV mini-series
2010	Coursier	The Dutch	Hervé Renoh	
2010	22 Bullets	Madame Fontarosa	Richard Berry	
2011	La grève des femmes	Madame Deschamps	Stéphane Kappes	TV movie
2011	De l'huile sur le feu	Madame Lavignasse	Nicolas Benamou	
2012	Scènes de ménages	Yvonne	Karim Adda & Francis Duquet	TV series (2 episodes)
2013	On My Way	Annie	Emmanuelle Bercot	
2013	Lulu femme nue	Marthe	Sólveig Anspach	Nominated - César Award for Best Supporting Actress
2014	Les fées du logis	Madame Berto	Pascal Forneri	TV movie
2015	Mon cher petit village	Adèle	Gabriel Le Bomin	TV movie
2015	Nos chers voisins	Doctor Derek's Grandma	Emmanuel Rigaut	TV series (1 episode)
2016	Baden Baden	Odette	Rachel Lang	
2017	Nos années folles		André Téchiné	
