= Michel Modo =

French actor (1937–2008)

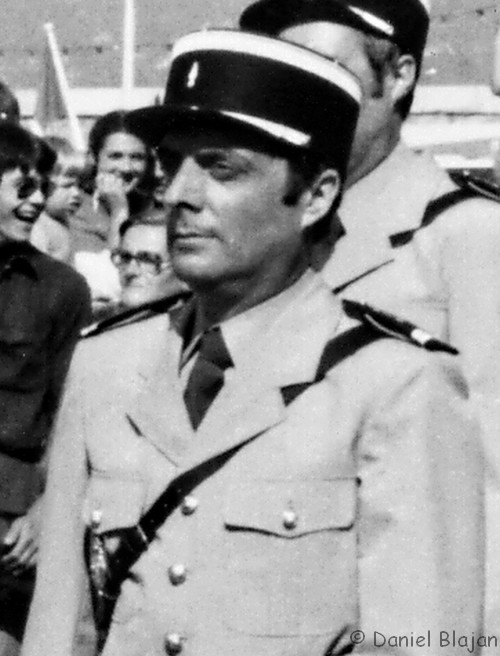
Modo in 1978

Michel Modo (born Michel Henri Louis Goi; 30 March 1937 – 25 September 2008) was a French actor and comedian. Modo died of cancer on 25 September 2008 in Vaires-sur-Marne (Seine-et-Marne).

== Career ==
He is best known in France for having formed in the late 1950s a comedy duo, Grosso et Modo, with actor Guy Grosso. The duo appeared in many movies with Louis de Funès, among which the series of Gendarmes de Saint Tropez, where he played the role of Constable Berlicot alongside Michel Galabru, Jean Lefebvre and Christian Marin. They were also Laflûte and Quince in The Dream of a Summer Night by Jean-Christophe Averty.

Between 1993 and 1997, he was one of the recurring actors in the television series Highlander. He played Maurice Lolande, a humorous character characterizing the average French person.

In December 2005, he stars in the television series Plus belle la vie alongside Colette Renard. He plays a bum philosopher disguised as Santa Claus.

He also dubbed several recurring characters in the French version of the animated series The Simpsons. At his sudden death in 2008 at the age of 71, while dubbing the last episodes of season 19, he was replaced on the spot by Gérard Rinaldi, who in turn died from cancer on 2 March 2012.

== Filmography ==
- La Belle Américaine (1961) as Slovak
- All the Gold in the World (1961) as Tony
- Carom Shots (1963) as Le facteur (uncredited)
- Kriss Romani (1963) as Le garde de Pilate (uncredited)
- Bebert and the Train (1963) as Un gendarme
- Le Gendarme de Saint-Tropez (1964) as Maréchal des Logis Berlicot
- Les gorilles (1964) as Un agent cycliste
- The Sucker (1965) as Un douanier
- La tête du client (1965) as Le collègue de François-Joseph
- Killer Spy (1965) as L'agent à la bicyclette qui verbalise #2
- The Gendarme in New York (1965) as Maréchal des Logis Berlicot
- What's Cooking in Paris (1966) as Petit Roger, un serveur
- Don't Look Now, We're Being Shot At (1966) as cross-eyed German soldier
- Un homme de trop (1967) as Le juif torturé
- La feldmarescialla (1967) as Fritz, Vogel's Assistant
- Le Gendarme se marie (1968) as Maréchal des Logis Berlicot
- Le Gendarme en balade (1970) as Maréchal des Logis Berlicot
- Le Cri du cormoran, le soir au-dessus des jonques (1970) as Le policier
- The Edifying and Joyous Story of Colinot (1973) as Le frère Robichon
- Operation Lady Marlene (1975) as Sansonnet
- On a retrouvé la septième compagnie (1975) as Le soldat 'groupir'
- The Smurfs and the Magic Flute (1976) as Peewit (voice)
- Ne me touchez pas... (1977) as Albert
- Le mille-pattes fait des claquettes (1977) as Le gendarme
- Les Bidasses au pensionnat (1978) as Sergeant Michaud
- Liebesgrüße aus der Lederhose, 5. Teil: Die Bruchpiloten vom Königssee (1978) as Konrad Zillich
- Le gendarme et les extra-terrestres (1979) as Maréchal des Logis Berlicot
- We'll Grow Thin Together (1979) as Le clerc de notaire
- Les fabuleuses aventures du légendaire Baron de Munchausen (1979) (voice)
- L'avare (1980) as La merluche
- Pétrole! Pétrole! (1981) as Alain Terrieur
- Le jour se lève et les conneries commencent (1981) as Norbert
- Les Bidasses aux grandes manœuvres (1981) as Sergent Merlin
- Si ma gueule vous plaît (1981) as Le vendeur du sex-shop
- Le Gendarme et les Gendarmettes (1982) as Maréchal des Logis Berlicot
- Le Braconnier de Dieu (1983) as The president of the polling station
- Les Planqués du régiment (1983) as Adjudant Badubec
- L'Exécutrice (1986) as Le commissaire
- The Big Bang (1987) as Conseillé (voice)
- My Father's Glory (1990) as le facteur
- My Mother's Castle (1990) as Le facteur
- Pétain (1993) as Pucheu
- Bimboland (1998) as Aristide Roumestan
- Poltergay (2006) as Henri 'Nanny' Bernier - le patron du bar
