= Dominique Davray =

French actress (1919–1998)

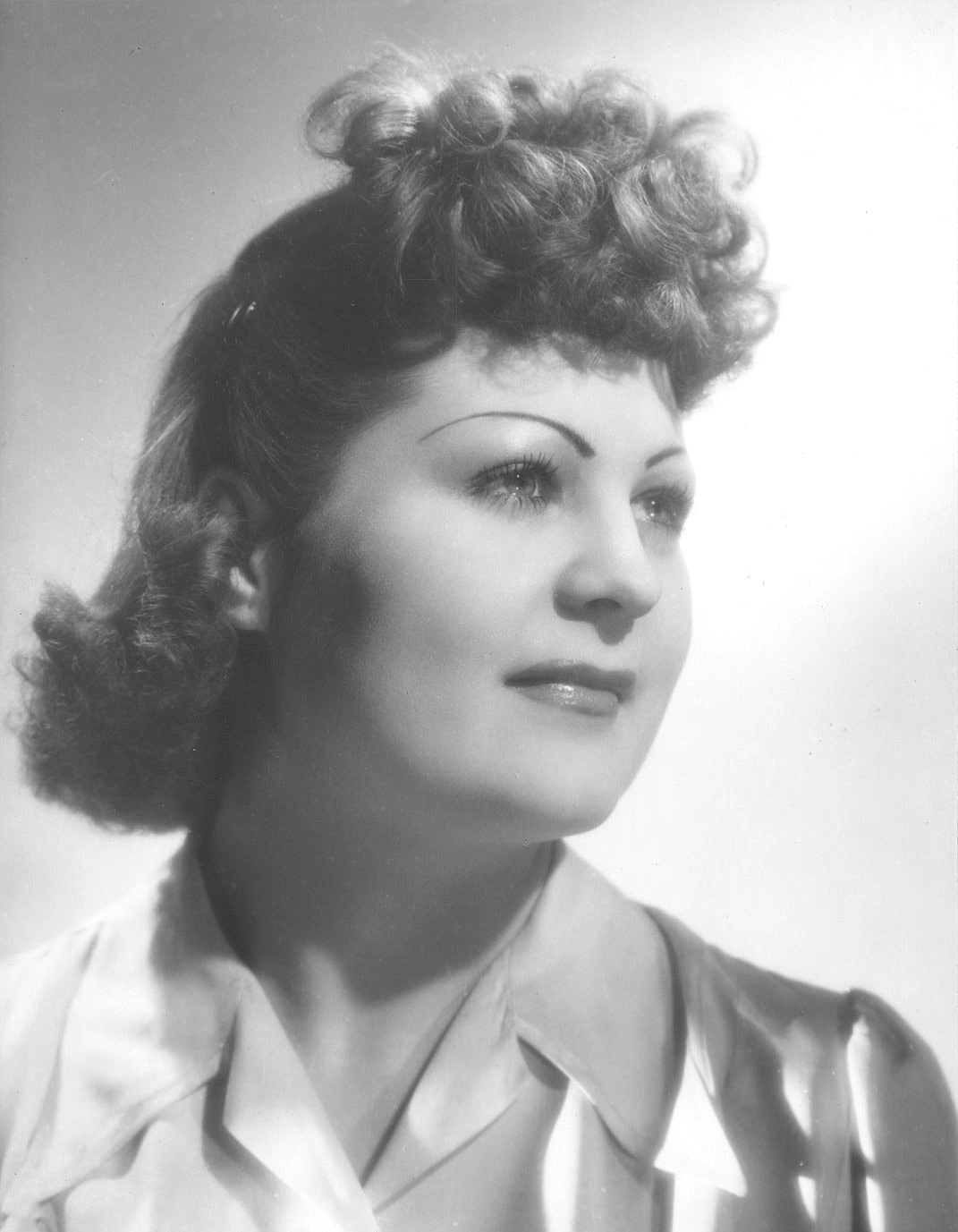
Dominique Davray

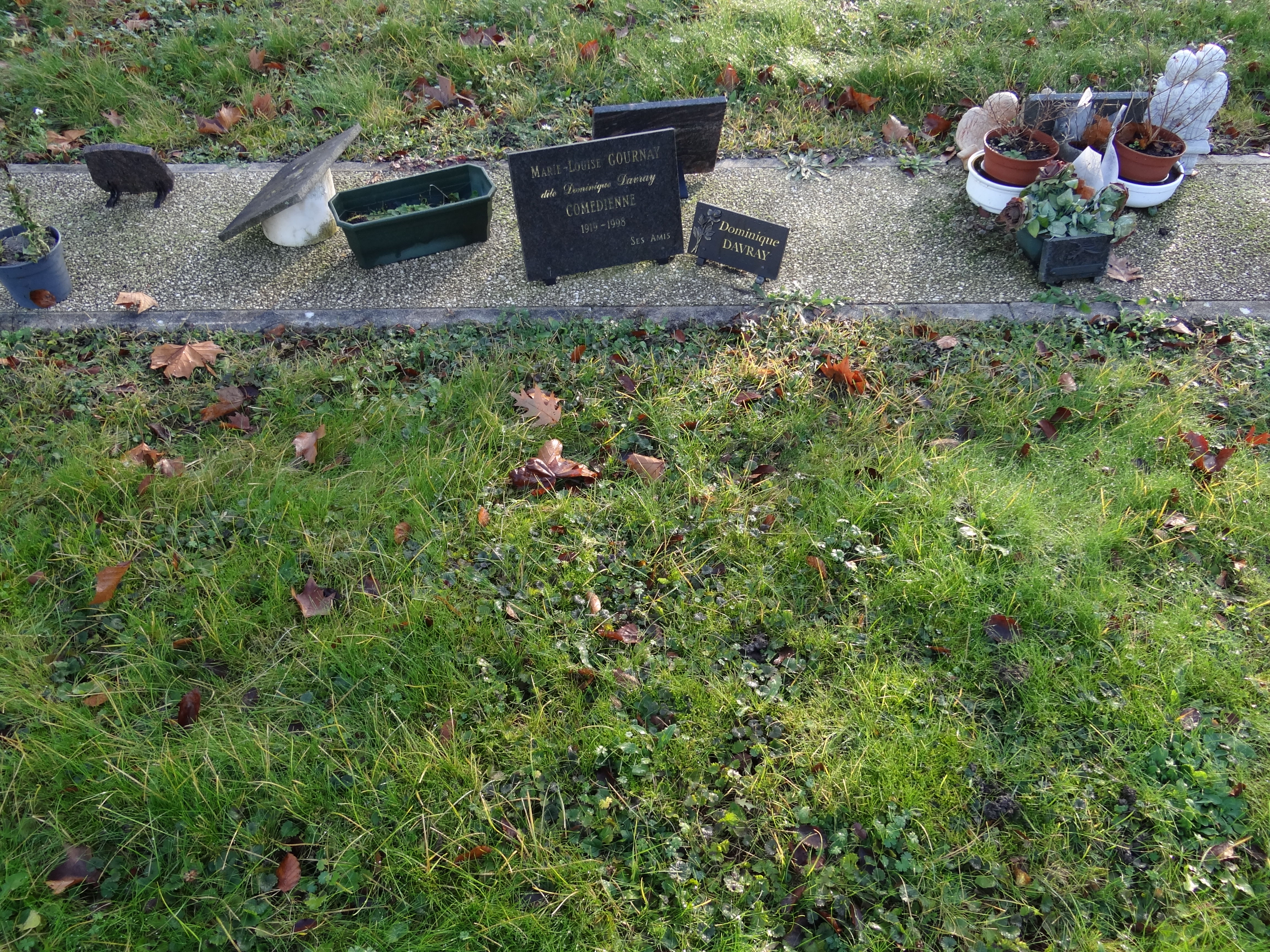
Grave of Dominique Davray in Pantin Cemetery

Dominique Davray (born Marie-Louise Gournay; 27 January 1919 in Paris – 16 August 1998 in Paris) was a French actress. She performed in more than 90 films from 1942 to 1983.

== Filmography ==
Film
Year	Title	Role	Notes
1942	The Duchess of Langeais	Une grisette	Uncredited
1948	L'assassin est à l'écoute		
1948	Le secret de Monte-Cristo		
1948	The Lame Devil	Minor Role	Uncredited
1949	Les dieux du dimanche		
1949	Cage of Girls	Une élève du cours	
1949	Maya	Une entraîneuse qui danse	Uncredited
1950	One Only Loves Once		
1950	Ma pomme		
1951	Mr. Peek-a-Boo		Uncredited
1951	Paris Vice Squad	Un prostituée	Uncredited
1952	Casque d'Or	Julie	
1953	Follow That Man	Mme Fernande - la couturière	
1953	Les Compagnes de la nuit	Une prostituée	Uncredited
1953	Act of Love	Une prostituée	Uncredited
1953	Flukt fra paradiset	En gatepike	
1954	Piédalu député	L'amie de Bardivol	
1954	Tempest in the Flesh	Margot, la plongeuse de la cantine	
1954	Touchez pas au grisbi	Une prostituée	Uncredited
1954	Papa, maman, la bonne et moi	La bouchère	
1955	Pas de souris dans le business	Marcelle	
1955	To Catch a Thief	Antoinette	Uncredited
1956	Marie Antoinette Queen of France	Une prisonnière	Uncredited
1956	Meeting in Paris		Uncredited
1957	Méfiez-vous fillettes	Arlette	
1957	Les Espions	L'Alsacienne	
1958	Maigret Sets a Trap	Marguerite Juteau	
1958	A Tale of Two Cities		Uncredited
1958	La Tour, prends garde !	Une invitée de Taupin	Uncredited
1958	Filles de nuit		
1958	Women's Prison	Une collègue d'Alice	
1959	Guinguette		
1959	The Big Chief	La voisine d'en face	
1960	La Main chaude	La fille des rues	
1960	Wasteland	Dan's mother	
1960	Boulevard	Catherine, la prostituée ivre	Uncredited
1961	Fanny	Woman #1 at fish market	Uncredited
1961	Par-dessus le mur	Une mère	
1961	Le Tracassin	La concierge de Loriot	
1962	Un cheval pour deux	La crémière	
1962	Le bateau d'Émile		
1962	Cartouche	Une fille de l'auberge	Uncredited
1962	Cléo from 5 to 7	Angèle	
1962	How to Succeed in Love	Joséphine	
1963	Du mouron pour les petits oiseaux	Gaby	
1963	Any Number Can Win	Léone	
1963	Les Tontons flingueurs	Mme Mado	
1963	Three Girls in Paris		
1964	Coplan Takes Risks	Prostitute	
1965	Cent briques et des tuiles	Poulaine	
1965	La tête du client	Une cliente du docteur Tannait	
1965	Trap for Cinderella	La concierge	
1965	How to Keep the Red Lamp Burning	Mme Blanche	(segment "Fermeture, La")
1966	Paris in August	Model	
1967	Les grandes vacances	Rose	
1968	Le tatoué	Suzanne Mézeray	
1968	A Flea in Her Ear	Olympe	
1968	Le gendarme se marie	La femme du professeur de danse	
1969	Hard Contract	Barmaid	Uncredited
1970	Le gendarme en balade	Une religieuse	
1972	Églantine	La marchande de casquettes	
1972	Les volets clos	Victoire	
1974	Going Places	Ursula / Suzanne	
1976	Calmos	Une employée du laboratoire	
1976	L'éducation amoureuse de Valentin	La femme du coiffeur	
1976	Le trouble-fesses	Angèle	
1976	The Wing or the Thigh	L'infirmière musclée	
1976	Le chasseur de chez Maxim's	La tante	
1977	Le Gang	La prostituée	
1979	Nous maigrirons ensemble		
1982	Les Misérables	Mère Magnon	
