= The Most Beautiful Month =

- Directed by: Guy Blanc
- Written by: François Boyer
- Produced by: Robert Dorfmann
- Starring: Georges Géret; Michel Galabru; Muriel Baptiste
- Cinematography: Georges Lendi
- Edited by: Sophie Blanc
- Music by: José Berghmans
- Production company: Les Films Corona
- Distributed by: Valoria Films
- Release date: 26 June 1968
- Running time: 80 minutes
- Country: France
- Language: French

The Most Beautiful Month (French: Le mois le plus beau) is a 1968 French comedy drama film directed by Guy Blanc and starring Georges Géret, Michel Galabru and Muriel Baptiste.

== Cast ==
- Georges Géret as Cyprien Boromès
- Michel Galabru as Besson
- Muriel Baptiste as Rosine
- Magali Noël as Claudia
- Yves Rénier as Bruno Besson
- Jean Bouise as Le curé
- Yves Robert as Le cheminot
- Daniel Gélin as Le capitaine du Génie
- Christian Marin as Le sergent
- Maxime Fabert as Julien
- Raoul Saint-Yves as Raoul
- Josette Vardier as La conductrice du bus
- Karamoko Cisse as Le Sénégalais

== Bibliography ==
- Monaco, James. The Encyclopedia of Film. Perigee Books, 1991.
