= La dernière bourrée à Paris =

- Directed by: Raoul André
- Written by: Raoul André; Michel Lebrun
- Produced by: Armand Tabuteau
- Starring: Patricia Lesieur; Francis Blanche; Michel Galabru; Marion Game; Daniel Prévost; Annie Cordy; Micheline Dax
- Cinematography: Roland Dantigny
- Edited by: Gabriel Rongier
- Music by: Vladimir Cosma
- Production companies: Albione Produzione; Les Films La Boëtie; Paris-Cannes Productions
- Distributed by: Les Films La Boëtie
- Release date: 31 October 1973
- Running time: 90 min
- Country: France
- Language: French
- Box office: $6.5 million

La Dernière Bourrée à Paris (Last bourrée in Paris, in French) is a 1973 French comedy film, directed by Raoul André.

== Plot ==
Berthe who lives a peaceful life is fascinated by the film Last Tango in Paris. During a strike in Paris, she finds an unoccupied apartment on the bank of the Seine and decides she wants to live love there with a man she has just met.

== Cast ==
- Patricia Lesieur as Berthe Payrac
- Tony Kendall as Victor
- Francis Blanche as Gaston Payrac
- Michel Galabru as Jules Payrac
- Marion Game as Lucie
- Daniel Prévost as Philippe
- Paul Préboist as Émile
- Jacques Préboist as François
- Danièle Nègre as Solange
- Annie Cordy as The psychoanalyst
- Roger Coggio as Man from Trust
- Micheline Dax as The apartment's owner
- Nicole Gobbi as The prostitute
- Christian Marin
- Darling Légitimus
- Paul Bisciglia
- Bernard Musson

== Production ==
According to Galabru, the film was shot on location in a mental institution with a group of folkloric dancers from Auvergne. The title song, composed by Vladimir Cosma, was sung by Annie Cordy, who also plays in the film. Despite the original idea of the film being to create parody of Last Tango in Paris, the director presented the film as a "modern comedy of manners"

== Reception ==
The film was very poorly received, one contemporary critic finding in it the "epitome of modern idiocy". Michel Galabru later recalled how he himself had found the premise ludicrous.
