= Gendarme in New York =

- French theatrical release poster.
- Directed by: Jean Girault
- Written by: Richard Balducci; Jean Girault; Jacques Vilfrid
- Produced by: SNC; Champion Film
- Starring: Louis de Funès; Geneviève Grad; Michel Galabru; Jean Lefebvre; Christian Marin
- Music by: Raymond Lefèvre; Paul Mauriat
- Distributed by: SNC; Champion Film
- Release date: 29 October 1965; (France)
- Running time: 100 minutes
- Countries: France; Italy
- Language: French
- Box office: 5,495,045 admissions (France)

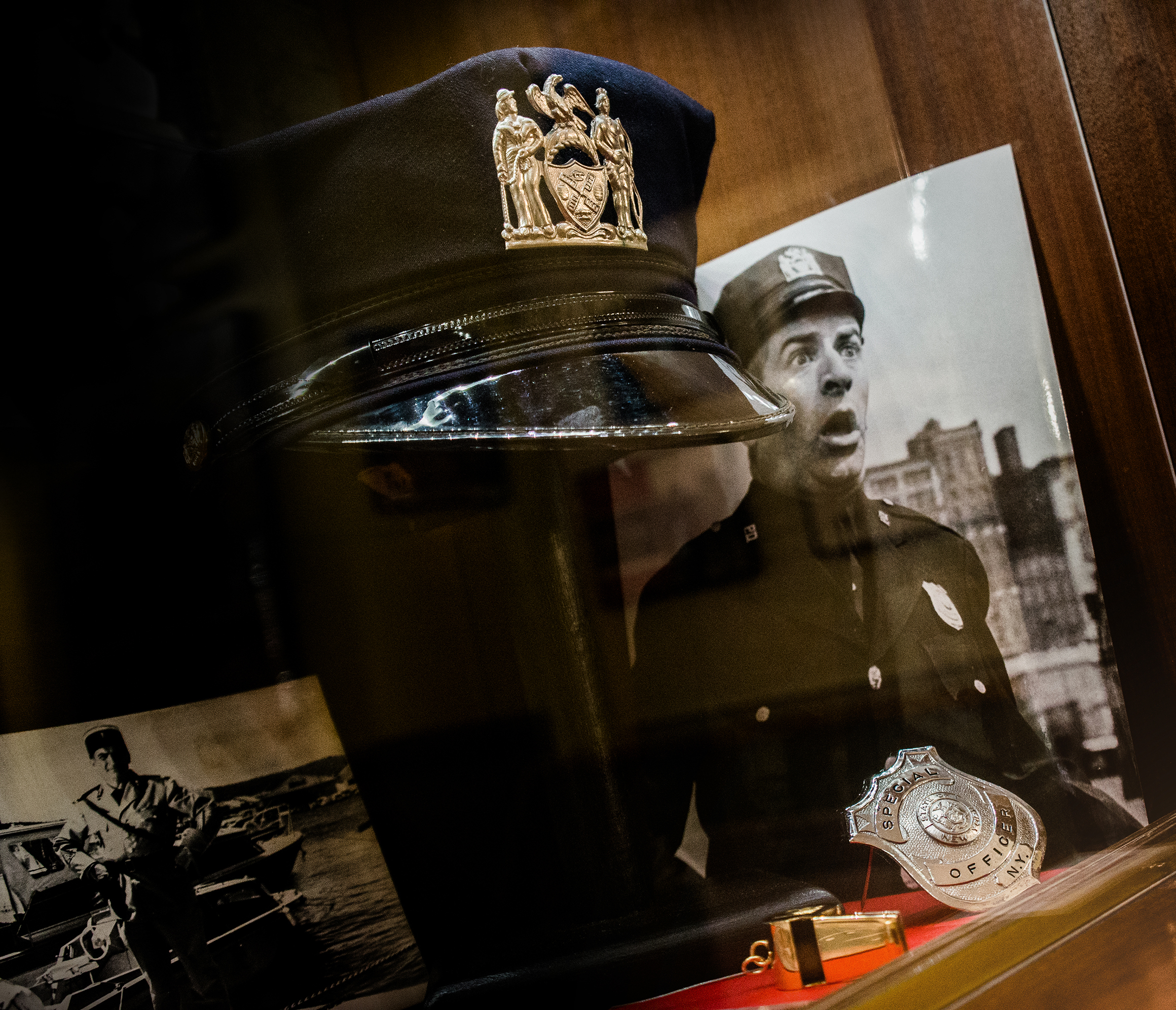
New York police cap and badge worn by Louis de Funès in the film Le Gendarme à New York. Below is a gold whistle bearing the initials of Louis de Funès. Exhibited at the Louis de Funès Museum.

Gendarme in New York (French: Le Gendarme à New York) is a 1965 sequel to the French comedy film The Troops of St. Tropez and part of the Gendarme series. It stars Louis de Funès as the gendarme along with Michel Galabru, Christian Marin, Guy Grosso and Michel Modo.

== Plot ==
The gendarmes of St. Tropez are invited to New York City to a law enforcement conference. They are supposed to travel alone without spouses or children but Cruchot's daughter Nicole wants to go to New York as it may be her only chance. Cruchot forbids her to go because disobeying an order may hurt his career. As Cruchot travels to Le Havre by plane and train, Nicole gets a ride from her friend and sneaks on board SS France and travels to America as a stowaway. During the journey Cruchot sees her hiding among the lifeboats but his captain convinces him that he is imagining things.

When the ship arrives at New York, Nicole is caught by an immigrations officer. She has no passport, visa or money so the immigrations officer decides to deliver her to the French embassy. Nicole is saved by a newspaper reporter who plans on running a cycle of romantic articles about a French orphan girl and her dreams. He houses her in a YWCA hotel and takes her to a live TV show where she sings live. During her stay she meets an Italian gendarme who already tried to win her over while on the ship. The Italian takes her to his relatives soon after Cruchot who has seen her performance on TV chases her out of the YWCA hotel and gets arrested.

Cruchot is released with a warning and a suggestion to visit a psychiatrist. After a Freudian episode with a psychiatrist Cruchot is relieved of his perceived visions. The captain sends him to find a real good cut of beef in order to make a proper French meal. Fumbling as usual, during a West Side Story parody scene he manages to help capture a wanted criminal and is honoured by a newspaper article the following day. While reading the article he notices a photograph of Nicole in an article about her romantic involvement with the Italian gendarme. He forces the Italian to reveal Nicole's whereabouts and proceeds to find her in the deli belonging to the Italian gendarme's family. He manages to take her away but they are both chased by the Sicilians who believe that Nicole was kidnapped. Cruchot and Nicole manage to escape by hiding in Chinatown and dressing as local Chinese couple.

Meanwhile, the Italian gendarme solicits the help of the NYPD and other gendarmes present at the congress to help him find his lost love. Cruchot transports Nicole to the airport by taxi in a luggage chest. He fails to arrive because of a small traffic incident and is forced to release Nicole from her confinement. Through a series of incidents Cruchot and Nicole manage to evade the NYPD and Cruchot's captain at a construction site and return to their abandoned taxi, which takes them to the airport.

At the airport Cruchot agrees to meet Nicole in the bar. When he arrives there she meets him dressed as an Air France flight attendant. She places him before a choice: either take the plane she will be flying on, thus risking discovery by the captain or make sure that they are late for their flight. Cruchot sabotages the gendarme's luggage making them late for the flight, while the captain sees a girl resembling Nicole fumbling with the airplane door. Cruchot manages to convince him that he is imagining things.

The movie cuts to Saint Tropez where the gendarmes are welcomed by the townsfolk, their wives and Nicole. The movie ends with the captain discovering that Nicole is wearing a dress that Cruchot bought for her in America. He confronts Cruchot with his insubordination.

== Reception ==
It was the fourth most popular film of 1965 in France, after The Sucker, Goldfinger and Thunderball, and before Mary Poppins, Fantomas Unleashed, God's Thunder and The Wise Guys.
