= Le Braconnier de Dieu =

- Directed by: Jean-Pierre Darras
- Screenplay by: Jean-Pierre Darras; Henri Coupon
- Produced by: Michel Albertini
- Starring: Pierre Mondy; Jean Lefebvre; Annie Cordy; Michel Galabru
- Music by: Claude Bolling
- Production companies: Les Productions Artistes Associés; Naja Films
- Distributed by: United Artists
- Release date: 5 January 1983
- Running time: 98 minutes
- Country: France
- Language: French
- Box office: $4.8 million

Le Braconnier de Dieu is a 1983 French comedy drama film directed by Jean-Pierre Darras.

== Cast ==
- Pierre Mondy as Brother Grégoire
- Jean Lefebvre as Vincent Espérandieu
- Annie Cordy as Jofrette
- Michel Galabru as Hilaire
- Jean-Pierre Darras as Frisou
- Catherine Allégret as Marie-Fraise
- Roger Pierre as M. Martin
- Bernard Haller as Jesus
- Sylvain Rougerie as Ulysse
- Corinne Lahaye as Muscade
- Jacques Préboist as Joseph
- Arielle Sémenoff as Magali
- Daniel Ceccaldi as The Abbot
- Paul Préboist as The Priest
- Rosy Varte as The Musician 1
- Odette Laure as The Musician 2
- Marthe Mercadier as The Hospitality
- Henri Génès as The Café's owner
- Jacques Dynam as The Brigadier
- Michel Modo as The president of the polling station
- Robert Rollis as The Lieutenant CRS
