= Le Gendarme en balade =

- Theatrical release poster
- Directed by: Jean Girault
- Written by: Richard Balducci; Jean Girault; Jacques Vilfrid
- Produced by: Renè Pigneres et Gérard Beytout
- Starring: Louis de Funès; Michel Galabru
- Cinematography: Pierre Montazel
- Edited by: Armand Psenny
- Music by: Raymond Lefèvre
- Distributed by: SNC
- Release date: 28 October 1970
- Running time: 100 minutes
- Countries: France; Italy
- Language: French
- Box office: $36.5 million

Le Gendarme en balade is a French comedy film and the fourth instalment of the Gendarme series starring Louis de Funès as Ludovic Cruchot and also known as "The Gendarme Takes Off" and "The Troops on Vacation". It is followed by two more films: Le gendarme et les extra-terrestres and Le Gendarme et les Gendarmettes.

== Plot ==
Changes are coming for the Gendarmerie Brigade of Saint Tropez. The gendarmes are forced into retirement to make way for a younger breed. Even so, when they learn that one of them has had an accident and has become amnesiac, they reunite to help him get his memory back. Along the way, they have to stop juvenile delinquents to put a nuclear warhead on a rocket said youths built, while being pursued by their younger colleagues.

== Cast ==
- Louis de Funès : Ludovic Cruchot
- Michel Galabru: Jérôme Gerber
- Claude Gensac: Josépha
- Jean Lefebvre: Fougasse
- Christian Marin: Merlot
- Guy Grosso: Tricard
- Michel Modo: Berlicot
- France Rumilly: Sister Clothilde
- Nicole Vervil: Madame Gerber
- Dominique Davray: The Abbess
- Yves Vincent: The Colonel
- Paul Préboist: The Groom
- Ugo Fangareggi: Hippie

== Reception ==
The film was the most popular at the French box office in 1970 with admissions of 4,870,609.
