= Soul Coaxing =

Single by Raymond Lefèvre

from the album Soul Coaxing
- B-side: "If I Were a Carpenter" (U.S.) "A Man and a Woman" (UK)
- Released: February 1968 (U.S.)
- Recorded: 1967
- Label: 4 Corners Records (U.S.); Riviera Records (UK)
- Songwriter: Michel Polnareff

Raymond Lefèvre singles chronology
"The Day the Rains Came" (1958)	"Soul Coaxing" (1968)

"Soul Coaxing" or "Âme câline", written in 1967 by French singer/songwriter Michel Polnareff, provided Raymond Lefèvre and His Orchestra with a 1968 instrumental hit.

== Chart performance ==
Released in the States in January 1968, "Soul Coaxing" peaked at No. 4 on the Easy Listening chart and at No. 37 on the Billboard Hot 100, in April, near the end of its 12-week run - though it reached the Top Ten in Boston, San Francisco, Pittsburgh, Columbus and other markets. "Soul Coaxing" debuted on Billboard's Hot 100 during the five-week run at No. 1 of the instrumental smash hit "Love Is Blue (L'Amour Est Bleu)" by Paul Mauriat and His Orchestra. As with Lefèvre, Mauriat was a well-known orchestral leader in his native France.

In Britain the single was issued on the Major Minor label and in May 1968 stalled at No. 46 in the singles chart, though it served as a theme tune for certain radio stations including Chiltern Radio Supergold, Radio Caroline and Radio Luxembourg. BBC World Service used the tune to introduce the documentary series, Network UK, in the 1980s.

== Other recordings ==
- Polnareff released his original vocal version ("Âme câline") across Europe in 1967.
- In 1968, American singer Peggy March (formerly Little Peggy March) released an English-language version titled "If You Loved Me", but it failed to chart.
- Other instrumental versions were recorded by Norrie Paramor, Franck Pourcel and Sounds Orchestral.
- In 1977, pioneering disco-era British-Indian musician and producer Biddu Appaiah (recording as the Biddu Orchestra) released a disco version of "Soul Coaxing".

== Use in other media ==
- BBC Radio 2 occasionally broadcasts Lefèvre's 1968 recording, particularly on its Saturday morning show Sounds of the 60s.
- The song is also used in the analog horror web series The Monument Mythos as the theme song of the character AirForceOneAngel
