= Catherine Serre =

French actress

- Born: 1954 (age 70–71)
- Occupation: Actress

Catherine Serre (b. 1954) is a French actress who graduated at conservatory in Nice. She is known for her credited roles in Moonraker where she played Countess Labinsky, one of the "perfect" human specimens from Drax's master race, and in the French Le gendarme et les gendarmettes films, where she appeared together with Nicaise Jean Louis, another Drax Girl from Moonraker. She has also appeared in nude pictorials in both Playboy and Mayfair magazines.

== Filmography ==
- 1972: Les témoins – Une prêtresse
- 1976: La situation est grave... mais pas désespérée (The situation is serious but not hopeless)
- 1978: One Two Two – Liza
- 1979: Les givrés – La monitrice
- 1979: Moonraker – Countess Labinsky (Drax's Girl)
- 1979: LeGagnant – Micheline (Bank Teller)
- 1980: Je vais craquer – Malika
- 1980: Mon oncle d'Amérique – La secrétaire de la direction générale
- 1980: Un pas dans la forêt – Elsie
- 1981: Pétrole! Oil! Pétrole! – La vendeuse de porcelaine
- 1981: Le fils-père – Irène, la mère
- 1981: Ne me parlez plus jamais d'amour – Sandrine
- 1982: Allô oui? Listen! J'écoute! – Liliane
- 1982: Le gendarme et les gendarmettes – Christine Rocourt
- 1984: Disparitions (TV Series) – (final appearance)
