= There's Nothing Wrong with Being Good to Yourself =

- French: C'est jeune et ça sait tout
- French: Y'a pas d'mal à se faire du bien
- Directed by: Claude Mulot
- Screenplay by: Claude Mulot; Michel Lebrun
- Produced by: Pierre Camo; Denis Héroux
- Starring: Jean Lefebvre; Françoise Lemieux; Michel Galabru; Darry Cowl
- Cinematography: Jacques Assuerus
- Edited by: François Ceppi; Dominique Frischeteau
- Music by: Eddie Vartan
- Production companies: TC Productions; Cinévidéo
- Distributed by: Compagnie Commerciale Française Cinématographique; Distributions Ciné-Capitale
- Release date: October 25, 1974
- Running time: 95 minutes
- Country: Canada
- Language: French

There's Nothing Wrong with Being Good to Yourself (French: C'est jeune et ça sait tout, lit. "She's So Young and Knows All", in France or French: Y'a pas d'mal à se faire du bien in Quebec) is a Canadian-French sex comedy film, directed by Claude Mulot and released in 1974.

The film stars Jean Lefebvre and Françoise Lemieux as Charles and Martine Lebrun, a couple from France residing in Montreal whose teenage niece Joëlle (Andrée Cousineau) is visiting for the summer. After Charles' coworker reveals that his own teenage daughter is pregnant, Charles decides to talk to Joëlle about the birds and the bees, only to discover that she already knows far more about sex than he does, in turn leading Charles and Martine to try to spice up their sex lives by delving into swinging.

The cast also includes Michel Galabru, Darry Cowl, Marcella Saint-Amant, Christine Fabréga, Michel Audiard, Nathalie Courval, Daniel Ceccaldi, Jean Lajeunesse, Réal Béland, Marie-France Beaulieu, Céline Bernier, Rina Berti, Paul Berval, Catherine Blanche, René Caron, Robert Desroches, Jacques Desrosiers, Jacques Famery, Roger Garceau, Robert Gillet, Germaine Giroux, Léo Ilial, Stéphanie Kinne, Suzanne Langlois, Michel Maillot, Danièle Ouimet, Gilles Pellerin, Carole Péloquin, Roméo Pérusse and André Vézina in supporting roles.

The film premiered in Quebec in October 1974; it was distributed by Ciné-Capitale, the fledgling film distribution arm of television station CFCM-DT. Commercial release in France followed in April 1975.
