= Jacques Vilfrid =

Jacques Vilfrid (23 January 1923 – 21 January 1988) was a French film director, film writer, and film producer. Born in Paris, he died there on 21 January 1988, at the age of 65.

== Filmography ==
- More Whiskey for Callaghan (1955)
- Le Triporteur (scenario, 1957)
- Les Livreurs (scenario and dialogue, 1959)
- Les Bricoleurs (scenario and dialogue, 1960)
- Les Pique-assiette (scenario and dialogue, 1960)
- Les Moutons de Panurge (dialogue, 1960)
- Les Nouveaux Aristocrates (scenario and dialogue, 1961)
- We Will Go to Deauville (scenario, adaptation and dialogue, 1962)
- Les Veinards (adaptation and dialogue, 1962) seulement les sketcks suivants
  - Le vison
  - Le repas gastronomique
  - Le yacht
- Pouic-Pouic (scenario and adaptation, 1963)
- Le Gendarme de Saint-Tropez (dialogue, 1964)
- Faites sauter la banque (scenario, 1964)
- Le Gendarme à New York (adaptation et dialogue, 1965)
- The Gorillas (scenario and dialogue, 1965)
- Monsieur le président-directeur général (scenario and dialogue, 1966)
- Les Grandes Vacances (scenario, adaptation and dialogue, 1967)
- Un drôle de colonel (scenario and dialogue, 1968)
- Le Gendarme se marie (dialogue, 1968)
- The Blonde from Peking (adaptation, 1968)
- Hibernatus (dialogue, 1969)
- Le Juge (dialogue, 1969)
- Le Gendarme en balade (scénario, 1970)
- Jo (scenario, 1971)
- Le Concierge (scenario and dialogue, 1973)
- Sam et Sally (scenario and dialogue, 1978)
- Le gendarme et les extra-terrestres (dialogue, 1979)
- Le Gendarme et les Gendarmettes (scenario, adaptation et dialogue, 1982)
