= Pouic-Pouic =

- Directed by: Jean Girault
- Written by: Jean Girault; Jacques Vilfrid
- Produced by: Roger Debelmas; Maurice Jacquin; Jean Girault
- Starring: Louis de Funès; Mireille Darc
- Cinematography: Marc Fossard
- Edited by: Jean-Michel Gautier
- Music by: Jean-Michel Defaye
- Production companies: Erdey films; Cormacico; Story Films
- Distributed by: UFA-Comacico
- Release date: 20 November 1963 (France)
- Running time: 90 minutes; 86 minutes (West Germany)
- Country: France
- Language: French

Pouic-Pouic is a French comedy film from 1963, directed by Jean Girault, written by Jean Girault and Jacques Vilfrid, starring Louis de Funès. The film is known under the titles: "Casamento a Propósito" (Portugal), "El pollo de mi mujer" (Spain), "Quietsch... quietsch... wer bohrt denn da nach Öl" (West Germany), "I 3 affari del signor Duval" (Italy).

== Cast ==
- Louis de Funès : Léonard Monestier
- Mireille Darc : Patricia Monestier
- Jacqueline Maillan : Cynthia Monestier
- Roger Dumas : Paul Monestier
- Maria-Rosa Rodriguez (called Yana Chouri) : Régine Mercier alias Palma Diamantino
- Philippe Nicaud : Simon Guilbaud
- Guy Tréjean : Antoine Brévin
- Christian Marin : Charles
- Daniel Ceccaldi : Pedro Caselli
- Philippe Dumat : Morrison
- Yves Barsacq : James
- Jean Girault : bald player in the grant
- Pierre Bouteiller : voice on radio
