= The Gendarme and the Extra-Terrestrials =

- Directed by: Jean Girault
- Written by: Richard Balducci; Jean Girault; Jacques Vilfrid
- Produced by: Gérard Beytout
- Starring: Louis de Funès; Michel Galabru; Maria Mauban; Maurice Risch
- Cinematography: Didier Tarot; Marcel Grignon
- Edited by: Michel Lewin
- Music by: Raymond Lefèvre
- Distributed by: SNC
- Release date: 2 February 1979
- Running time: 90 minutes
- Country: France
- Language: French

The Gendarme and the Extra-Terrestrials (French: Le Gendarme et Les Extraterrestres) is a continuation of the Gendarme series starring Louis de Funès as Ludovic Cruchot. It is also known as The Gendarme and the Creatures from Outer Space and is followed by Le Gendarme et les Gendarmettes, the final film in the series.

== Plot ==
The actions once again take place in the small French town of Saint-Tropez. While driving with one of his gendarmes, Cruchot (Louis de Funès) has to stop in order to fix the car. The gendarme wanders away and sees a flying saucer in a field which then flies away. He tries to tell Cruchot and the rest of the station, but they don't believe him. Shortly after, the same occurs with Cruchot and the chief of the gendarmes. This time it is Cruchot who wanders away and sees the saucer, however the chief does not believe him. Later on, when the same gendarme is doing paperwork in the office, a young man appears in front of him and says that he is a part of an alien expedition which has arrived to Saint-Tropez in order to examine humanity as people from all around the globe go to Saint-Tropez during the summer. The alien demonstrates its shapeshifting ability by transforming into the same gendarme it is talking to. The gendarme runs and tells Cruchot, who doesn't believe him. In the midst of the racket, the chief comes and sends the gendarme away. The chief reveals that he is actually an alien disguised as the chief, and when Cruchot doesn't believe him the alien becomes agitated and uses laser vision to cause damage to Cruchot's room. He relents when a watch on his hand flashes red and drinks something out of a flask. The alien begins coughing and upon hitting it on the back, Cruchot discovers it makes a metallic sound. Later on when the real chief arrives, Cruchot stabs him with a screwdriver thinking that it is the alien. The chief orders Cruchot out, since the supervisor will come in tomorrow to check up on the station. During the check up, Cruchot notices the same watch on the supervisor as on the alien he saw last night and attempts to attack him. The gendarmes hold him back while the alien supervisor flees, and the real supervisor arrive. Cruchot once again stabs the real supervisor thinking he is an alien. He is arrested, but escapes the station.

Cruchot hides at a church while the gendarmes search for him and eventually manages to evade them. He then attempts to track down the aliens, which proves to be difficult as they can only be identified by the metallic sound they make when struck. He runs into an alien disguising as a gendarme at night in the woods, but manages to run away. He encounters another alien on the beach during the day, which manages to run away to avoid being exposed. This alien labels Cruchot a threat and orders him eliminated. Later at night, Cruchot sneaks into his own house to find his wife waiting. She convinces Ludovic to go on a night drive and they end up in the woods as per her directions. They encounter the flying saucer within the woods, which Cruchot's wife insists he enters. Cruchot realizes the woman next to him is actually an alien in disguise and manages to flee. Some of the gendarmes who were searching for him happen to witness this encounter and now believe Cruchot and agree to help him find the aliens. The next day at a restaurant, they encounter 2 aliens who they identify by them drinking machine oil. They attempt to ambush the aliens, and during the scuffle one of aliens is doused in water from an aquarium. The other flees but not before telling the gendarmes to stop their struggle. The chief, who regularly dines at the restaurant, arrives to find it has vanished due to one of the aliens disintegrating it. He finds the alien who was doused in water walking along the beach, evidently hurt. As he follows the alien, it falls apart and collapses, revealing that the aliens are actually robots made of metal. The chief brings the remains of the robot to Cruchot and the gendarmes who deduce that water causes the metallic aliens to rust. They then use a fire truck to spray the citizens of Saint-Tropez with water, hoping to cause damage to any aliens in disguise. When the supervisor confronts them about this, they reveal the alien's remains, convincing the supervisor of the threat.

The gendarmes build a replica saucer to bait out the aliens and place it in the field where they had seen the saucer before. When the actual aliens arrive to investigate the second saucer, they disguise themselves as the gendarmes. The actual gendarmes then ambush them and spray them with water using packs on their back. Despite being sprayed with water, the aliens use their laser vision do destroy the gendarmes' water packs. The gendarmes briefly engage the aliens in hand-to-hand combat before the aliens seemingly retreat into their saucer and fly away. The next day, the gendarmes are being saluted as heroes at a parade, when they suddenly start making metallic noises and collapse. It is revealed that these are actually the alien gendarmes. Moments later, the flying saucer comes out of nowhere and flies over the crowd, being piloted by the real gendarmes who accidentally boarded the real saucer. The saucer runs out of power and falls into the sea. The gendarmes get out, and are hailed as heroes by Saint-Tropez.

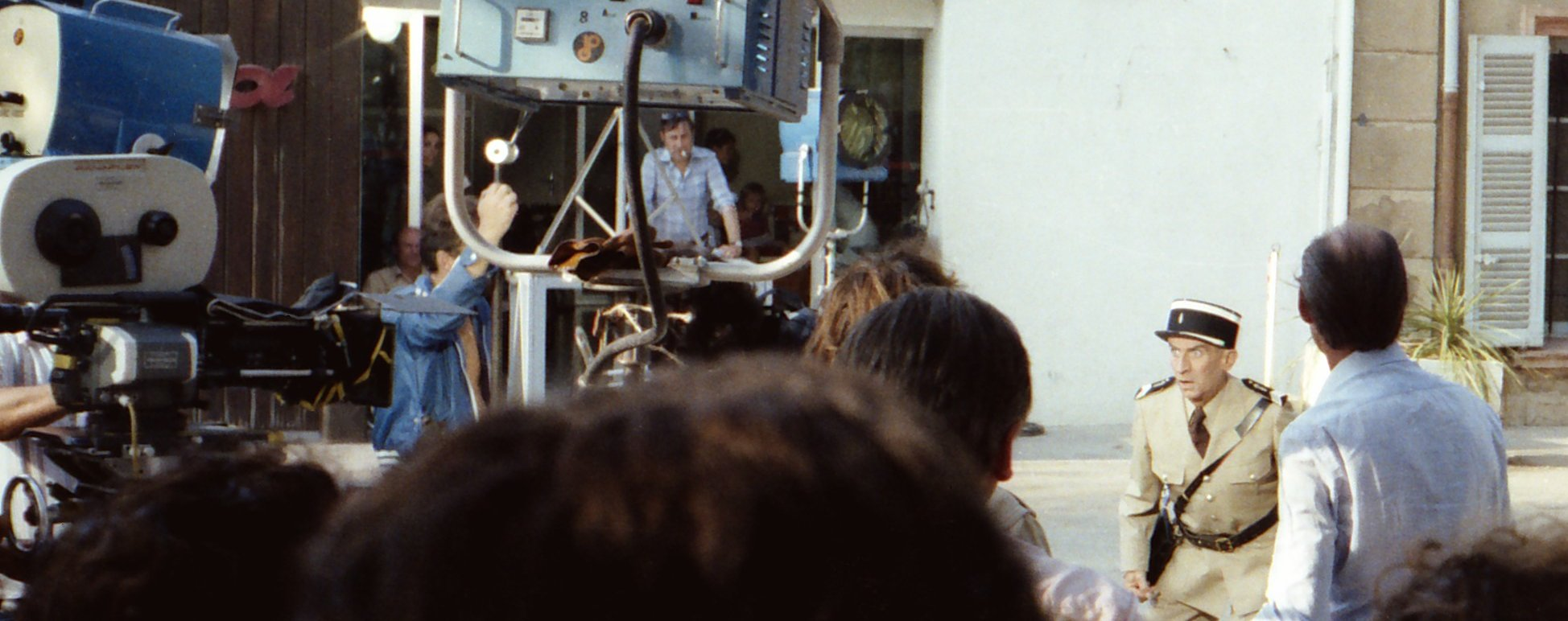
Louis de Funès during the shooting of Le gendarme et les extra-terrestres

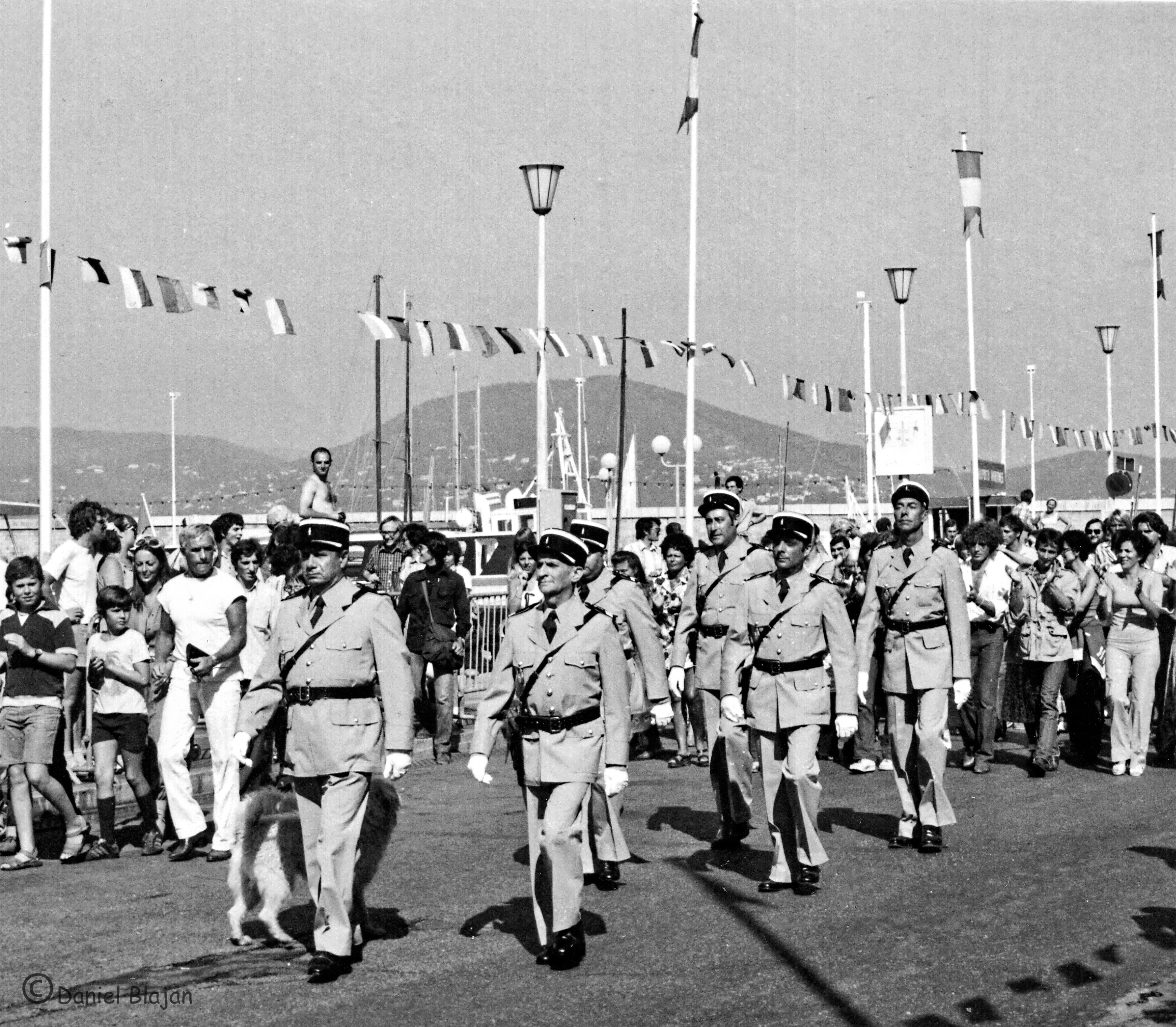
Filming of the final parade

== Cast ==
- Louis de Funès: Ludovic Cruchot
- Michel Galabru: Jérôme Gerber
- Maurice Risch: Beaupied
- Jean-Pierre Rambal: Taupin
- Guy Grosso: Gaston Tricard
- Michel Modo: Jules Berlicot
- France Rumilly: Sister Clotilde
- Lambert Wilson: An alien
