= Yves Barsacq =

French actor (1931–2015)

- Born: 17 June 1931; Paris, France
- Died: 4 October 2015 (aged 84); Albenga, Italy
- Occupation: Actor
- Years active: 1957–2013

Yves Barsacq (17 June 1931 – 4 October 2015) was a French film actor, who appeared in more than 150 films. He was the son of the French-Russian production designer Léon Barsacq and the nephew of the French theatre director André Barsacq.

== Selected filmography ==
- Amour de poche (1957)
- Charming Boys (1957)
- Line of Sight (1960)
- Sergeant X (1960)
- All the Gold in the World (1961)
- The Law of Men (1962)
- Pouic-Pouic (1963)
- Angélique, Marquise des Anges (1964)
- Play Time (1967)
- Le Gendarme se marie (1968)
- Le Gendarme en balade (1970)
- Elise, or Real Life (1970)
- Le Chat (1971)
- Hit! (1973)
- Love and Death (1975)
- F comme Fairbanks (1976)
- The Passengers (1977)
- Julien Fontanes, magistrat (1981)
- Princes et princesses (2000)
