= Maurice Risch =

French actor

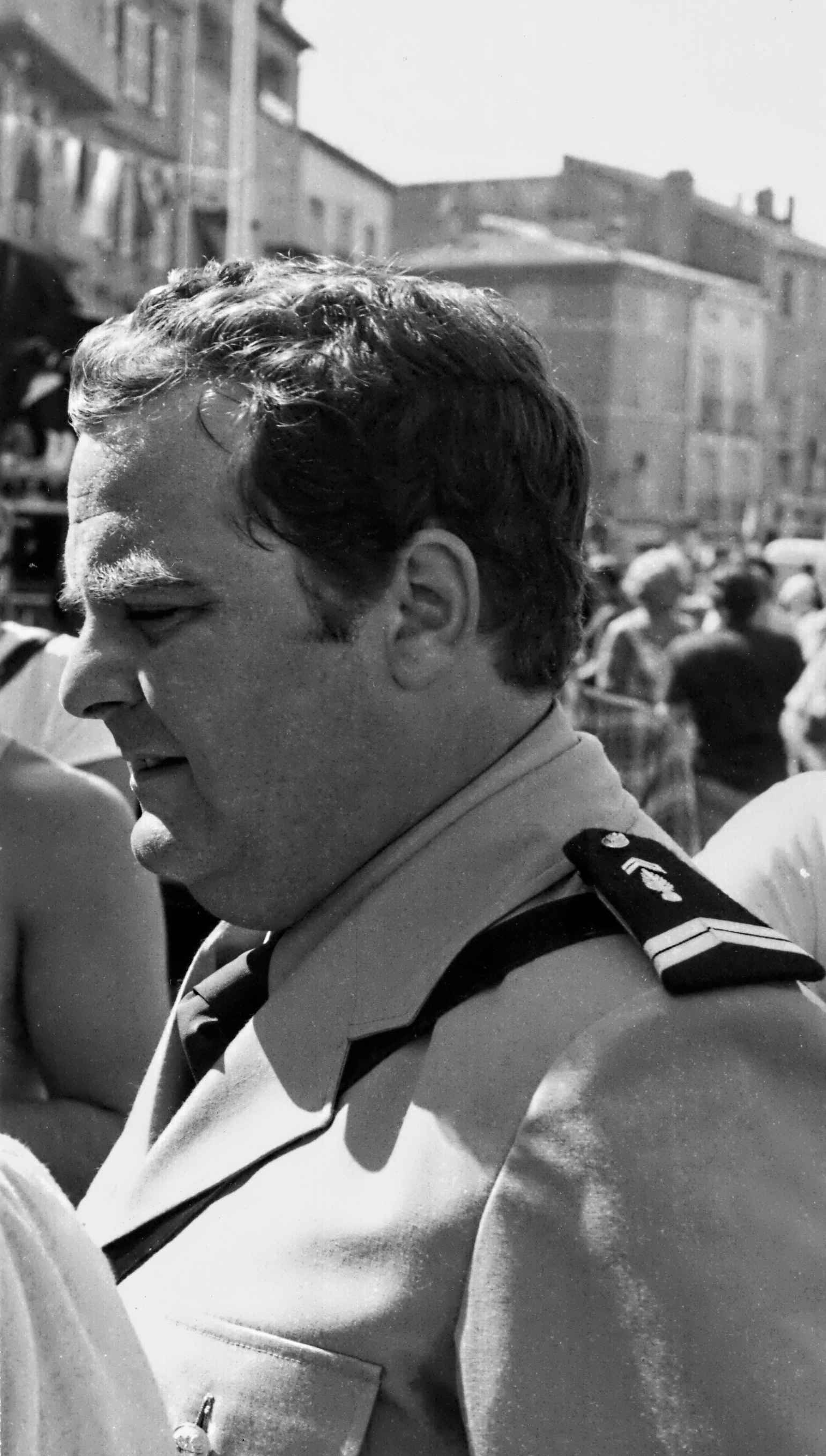
- Risch in 1978
- Born: 25 January 1943 (age 83); Paris, France
- Occupation: Actor
- Years active: 1964–2015

Maurice Risch (born 25 January 1943) is a French film and theatre actor.

== Filmography ==
Year	Title	Role	Notes
1966	Le Grand Restaurant	Julien, un serveur	Uncredited
1967	Les grandes vacances	Stéphane Michonnet	
1970	Le pistonné	L'adjudant Clochon	
1972	L'oeuf	Gustave	
1972	We Won't Grow Old Together	Michel	
1972	Tout le monde il est beau, tout le monde il est gentil	Un rédacteur	
1973	Hail the Artist	Le photographe	
1974	Le führer en folie	Johnny	
1975	Opération Lady Marlène	Le soldat du métro	
1976	L'éducation amoureuse de Valentin	Louis	
1976	Le trouble-fesses	Ernesto Capoli	
1976	Les naufragés de l'île de la Tortue	Joël Dupoirier, dit 'Gros Nono'	
1977	Un oursin dans la poche	Benjamin T'serglaess	
1978	La zizanie	'L'imbécile	
1979	Le gendarme et les extra-terrestres	Le maréchal des logis Beaupied	
1980	The Last Metro	Raymond Boursier	
1980	The Umbrella Coup	Le producteur de Paris	
1981	Les Fourberies de Scapin	Sylvestre	
1981	Signé Furax	L'ivrogne de l'Obélisque	
1981	Le jour se lève et les conneries commencent	Philippe	
1981	Beau-père	Nicolas	
1981	L'ombre rouge	Marcel	
1982	Les p'tites têtes	Henri	
1982	Le gendarme et les gendarmettes	Maréchal des Logis Beaupied	
1983	Mon curé chez les Thaïlandaises	Le curé Maximin	
1984	Retenez Moi...Ou Je Fais Un Malheur	Inspeceur Farett	
1984	Vive les femmes!	Mammouth	
1984	La smala	Gégène	
1984	Le gendarme et l'empereur	Henri Beaupied	
1986	Paulette, la pauvre petite milliardaire	Le chef du personnel	
1986	Justice de flic	L'inspecteur Bernadac	
1986	Gros dégueulasse	Gros dégueulasse	
1986	Asterix in Britain	Châteaupétrus	Voice
1986	Les Clowns de Dieu	Mac Goy	
2001	Day Off	Grogneau	
2005	Mon petit doigt m'a dit...	M. Coupelay	
2006	Le grand appartement	Ravambuse, le gérant	
