= Société nouvelle de cinématographie =

French film production and distribution company

Société Nouvelle de Cinématographie (New Society of Cinematography)
- Company type: Film production and distribution
- Industry: Film
- Founded: 1934; 92 years ago
- Founder: René Pignères and Léon Beytout
- Defunct: 2013; 13 years ago
- Headquarters: France
- Products: Films
- Services: Production, distribution
- Parent: Groupe M6 (2005–)

The Société nouvelle de cinématographie (SNC) is a French film production and distribution company founded in 1934 by René Pignères and Léon Beytout.

SNC produced and distributed many films with Louis de Funès including the six films in the Gendarme de Saint-Tropez series.

The company and its catalog now belong to the Groupe M6. In the 2010s, M6 Video re-released films from the SNC catalog in two collections: Les Classiques français (The French Classics) and Les Classiques italiens (The Italian Classics).

== Filmography ==
=== Production ===
==== 1930s ====
- 1934 : Maria Chapdelaine de Julien Duvivier
- 1935 : La Bandera by Julien Duvivier
- 1936 : La Flamme by André Berthomieu
- 1937 : L'Ange du foyer by Léon Mathot
- 1938 : Les Filles du Rhône by Jean-Paul Paulin

==== 1950s ====
- 1951 : Le Chéri de sa concierge by René Jayet
- 1954 : Le Secret d'Hélène Marimon by Henri Calef
- 1954 : Femmes libres (Una donna libera) by Vittorio Cottafavi
- 1955 : Boulevard du crime by René Gaveau
- 1956 : L'inspecteur connaît la musique by Jean Josipovici
- 1956 : Ces sacrées vacances by Robert Vernay
- 1956 : Zaza by René Gaveau
- 1957 : Fumée blonde by Robert Vernay and André Montoisy
- 1958 : Jeunes filles en uniforme (Mädchen in Uniform) by Géza von Radványi
- 1959 : Ça n'arrive qu'aux vivants by Tony Saytor
- 1959 : La Vengeance du Sarrasin (La scimitarra del Saraceno) by Piero Pierotti

==== 1960s ====
- 1960 : À bout de souffle by Jean-Luc Godard
- 1960 : Les Pirates de la côte (I pirati della costa) by Domenico Paolella
- 1961 : La Terreur des mers (Il terrore dei mari) by Domenico Paolella
- 1961 : Les hommes veulent vivre by Léonide Moguy
- 1961 : Les Bras de la nuit by Jacques Guymont
- 1961 : Mary la rousse, femme pirate (Le avventure di Mary Read) by Umberto Lenzi
- 1962 : Le Petit Garçon de l'ascenseur by Pierre Granier-Deferre
- 1962 : La Dernière Attaque by Leopoldo Savona
- 1962 : Le Trésor du lac d'argent (Der Schatz im Silbersee) by Harald Reinl
- 1963 : Catherine de Russie (Caterina di Russia) by Umberto Lenzi
- 1963 : Le Petit Soldat by Jean-Luc Godard
- 1963 : L'Invincible Cavalier noir (L'invincibile cavaliere mascherato) by Umberto Lenzi
- 1963 : Un drôle de paroissien by Jean-Pierre Mocky
- 1963 : Le Secret de Joselito (El secreto de Tommy) by Antonio del Amo
- 1963 : Les Pirates du Mississippi (Die Flußpiraten vom Mississippi) by Jürgen Roland
- 1963 : D'où viens-tu Johnny ? by Noël Howard
- 1963 : La Révolte des Indiens Apaches (Winnetou 1. Teil) byHarald Reinl
- 1964 : Les Diamants du Mékong (Die Diamantenhölle am Mekong) by Gianfranco Parolini
- 1964 : L'Attaque du fourgon postal (Zimmer 13) by Harald Reinl
- 1964 : Le Mystère de la jonque rouge (Weiße Fracht für Hongkong) by Helmut Ashley
- 1964 : Le Gendarme de Saint-Tropez by Jean Girault
- 1964 : Le Trésor des montagnes bleues (Winnetou 2. Teil) by Harald Reinl
- 1964 : La Grande Frousse by Jean-Pierre Mocky
- 1964 : Les Chercheurs d'or de l'Arkansas by Paul Martin
- 1964 : Avec amour et avec rage by Pasquale Festa Campanile
- 1964 : Parmi les vautours (Unter Geiern) by Alfred Vohrer
- 1965 : Les Aigles noirs de Santa Fé (Die schwarzen Adler von Santa Fe) by Ernst Hofbauer
- 1965 : Passeport diplomatique agent K 8 by Robert Vernay
- 1965 : Espionnage à Bangkok pour U-92 (Der Fluch des schwarzen Rubin) de Manfred R. Köhler
- 1965 : La Fabuleuse Aventure de Marco Polo de Denys by La Patellière and Noël Howard
- 1965 : Pierrot le fou by Jean-Luc Godard
- 1965 : L'aventure vient de Manille (Die letzten Drei der Albatros) by Wolfgang Becker
- 1965 : Les Grandes Gueules by Robert Enrico
- 1965 : Le Gendarme à New York
- 1966 : La Ligne de démarcation by Claude Chabrol
- 1966 : Objectif 500 millions by Pierre Schoendoerffer
- 1966 : À belles dents by Pierre Gaspard-Huit
- 1966 : Ça casse à Caracas (Inferno a Caracas) by Marcello Baldi
- 1966 : The Saint Lies in Wait by Christian-Jaque
- 1967 : Suzanne Simonin, la Religieuse de Diderot ou La Religieuse de Jacques Rivette
- 1967 : Les Aventuriers by Robert Enrico
- 1967 : La Loi du survivant by José Giovanni
- 1967 : Deux billets pour Mexico by Christian-Jaque
- 1967 : Diaboliquement vôtre by Julien Duvivier
- 1968 : Tante Zita by Robert Enrico
- 1968 : Les Cracks by Alex Joffé
- 1968 : Les Jeunes Loups by Marcel Carné
- 1968 : Un drôle de colonel by Jean Girault
- 1968 : La Motocyclette (The Girl on a Motorcycle) by Jack Cardiff
- 1968 : Le Gendarme se marie by Jean Girault
- 1969 : La Piscine by Jacques Deray
- 1969 : Une folle envie d'aimer (Orgasmo) by Umberto Lenzi
- 1969 : Un corpo caldo per l'inferno by Franco Montemurro
- 1969 : Les Étrangers by Jean-Pierre Desagnat
- 1969 : Money-Money by José Varela

==== 1970 ====
- 1970 : Que fais-tu grande folle ? (Splendori e miserie di Madame Royale) by Vittorio Caprioli
- 1970 : Paranoia by Umberto Lenzi
- 1970 : La Horse by Pierre Granier-Deferre
- 1970 : Ces messieurs de la gâchette by Raoul André
- 1970 : Le Petit Bougnat by Bernard Toublanc-Michel
- 1970 : Nous n'irons plus au bois de Georges Dumoulin
- 1970 : Le Mur de l'Atlantique by Marcel Camus
- 1970 : Le Gendarme en balade de Jean Girault
- 1970 : La Liberté en croupe by Édouard Molinaro
- 1971 : Sur un arbre perché by Serge Korber
- 1971 : Quelqu'un derrière la porte by Nicolas Gessner
- 1971 : Un peu de soleil dans l'eau froide by Jacques Deray
- 1971 : Les Pétroleuses by Christian-Jaque
- 1972 : Les Feux de la Chandeleur by Serge Korber
- 1972 : Le Bar de la Fourche by Alain Levent
- 1972 : La Vallée by Barbet Schroeder
- 1972 : Canterbury interdit (Le mille e una notte all'italiana) by Carlo Infascelli
- 1972 : Le Grand Duel (Il grande duello) by Giancarlo Santi
- 1973 : Le Mariage à la mode by Michel Mardore
- 1973 : L'Affaire Dominici by Claude Bernard-Aubert
- 1973 : Vivre ensemble by Anna Karina
- 1973 : La Poursuite implacable (Revolver) by Sergio Sollima
- 1973 : Prêtres interdits by Denys de La Patellière
- 1974 : Deux Grandes Filles dans un pyjama by Jean Girault
- 1974 : Dis-moi que tu m'aimes by Michel Boisrond
- 1975 : Trop c'est trop by Didier Kaminka
- 1975 : N'Diangane (Njangaan) by Mahama Johnson Traoré
- 1975 : Numéro deux by Jean-Luc Godard and Anne-Marie Miéville
- 1976 : Jamais plus toujours by Yannick Bellon
- 1976 : L'Année sainte by Jean Girault
- 1977 : Comme sur des roulettes by Nina Companeez
- 1978 : Comment ça va by Jean-Luc Godard et Anne-Marie Miéville
- 1979 : Le Gendarme et les Extra-terrestres by Jean Girault
- 1979 : Je te tiens, tu me tiens par la barbichette by Jean Yanne

==== 1980s ====
- 1980 : La légion saute sur Kolwezi by Raoul Coutard
- 1980 : Tout dépend des filles by Pierre Fabre
- 1980 : L'Empreinte des géants by Robert Enrico
- 1981 : Fais gaffe à la gaffe ! by Paul Boujenah
- 1982 : Le Gendarme et les Gendarmettes by Jean Girault and Tony Aboyantz
- 1983 : L'Été meurtrier by Jean Becker
- 1985 : Liberté, Égalité, Choucroute by Jean Yanne

==== Since 1990s ====
- 1992 : Les Nuits fauves by Cyril Collard
- 1995 : Zadoc et le Bonheur by Pierre-Henri Salfati
- 1995 : Bye-bye by Karim Dridi
- 1997 : Saraka bô by Denis Amar
- 1999 : Mon père, ma mère, mes frères et mes sœurs… by Charlotte de Turckheim
- 2003 : Une affaire qui roule by Éric Veniard
- 2014 : Astérix : Le Domaine des dieux by Alexandre Astier and Louis Clichy
- 2014 : Un village presque parfait by Stéphane Meunier
- 2018 : L'école est finie by Anne Depétrini
- 2019 : Tanguy, le retour by Étienne Chatiliez

=== Distribution ===
==== French films ====
- 1935: La Bandera by Julien Duvivier
- 1965: M'sieur la caille

==== Foreign films distributed in France ====
- Once Upon a Time in America (1984) by Sergio Leone
