= Christian Marin =

French actor (1929–2012)

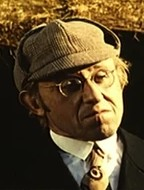
Christian Marin

Christian Marin (8 February 1929 – 5 September 2012) was a French film actor. Born in Lyon, he is best known for his role in Le gendarme series (as "Merlot"), although he did not appear in the last two sequels. In 1967 he appeared in the television serial Les Chevaliers du ciel, in which he portrayed the character Ernest Laverdure.

== Partial filmography ==
- Les Tortillards (1960)
- Le Tracassin ou Les Plaisirs de la ville (1961)
- La Belle Américaine (1961)
- All the Gold in the World (1961)
- L'honorable Stanislas, agent secret (1963)
- Pouic-Pouic (1963)
- Bebert and the Train (1963)
- Le gendarme de Saint-Tropez (1964)
- Le gendarme à New York (1965)
- The Sleeping Car Murders (1965)
- The Duke's Gold (1965)
- Le gendarme se marie (1967)
- The Most Beautiful Month (1968)
- Le gendarme en balade (1970)
- La dernière bourrée à Paris (1973)
- Toutes griffes dehors (1982)
- Dead Man Talking (2012)
