= Let's Rob the Bank =

Faites sauter la banque!
- Directed by: Jean Girault
- Written by: Louis Sapin; Jean Girault
- Produced by: Raymond Danon
- Starring: Louis de Funès; Jean-Pierre Marielle; Yvonne Clech
- Cinematography: André Germain
- Edited by: Jean-Michel Gautier
- Music by: Paul Mauriat
- Distributed by: UFA-Comacico
- Release date: 25 February 1964 (France)
- Running time: 88 minutes
- Country: France
- Language: French

Faites sauter la banque! English: Rob the Bank, is a French comedy film from 1964, directed by Jean Girault, written by Louis Sapin and Jean Girault, starring Louis de Funès. The film is known under the titles: "Rob the Bank" (International English title), "El gran golpe" (Spain), "Balduin, der Geldschrank-Knacker" (West Germany), "Faccio saltare la banca" (Italy).

== Cast ==
- Louis de Funès: Victor Garnier, owner of a store of Chasse et Pêche
- Jean-Pierre Marielle: André Durand-Mareuil, the banker, neighbour of Victor
- Yvonne Clech: Éliane Garnier, wife of Victor
- Anne Doat: Isabelle Garnier, the elder daughter
- Michel Tureau: Gérard Garnier, son
- Catherine Demongeot: Corinne Garnier, the younger daughter
- Georges Wilson: Policeman
- Jean Valmont: Philippe Brécy
- Claude Piéplu: The Priest
- Georges Adet: Gerber, the employee responsible for chests
- Florence Blot: Housemaid
- Nicole Chollet: a client
- Alix Mahieux: Poupette, Belgian cousin
- Michel Dancourt: Casimir, Belgian cousin
- Jean Lefebvre: Construction foreman
- Dominique Zardi
- Guy Grosso: a client
- Yvonne Rozille
- Jean Droze
