= Raymond Lefèvre =

French easy listening orchestra leader, arranger and composer (1929–2008)

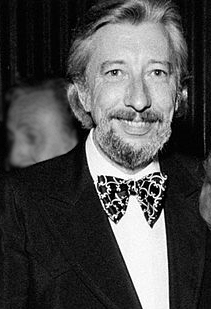
Raymond Lefèvre

Raymond Lefèvre (20 November 1929 – 27 June 2008) was a French easy listening orchestra leader, arranger and composer.

== Biography and career ==
Born on 20 November 1929 in Calais, France, Raymond Lefèvre is best known for his interpretation of the 1968 theme "Soul Coaxing (Ame Caline)" (composed by Michel Polnareff), which became an international hit. He also wrote soundtracks for movies with Louis de Funès such as La Soupe Aux Choux (1981) or the series Le Gendarme de Saint Tropez. During the late 1950s and early 1960s, he accompanied Dalida on most of her recordings (Bambino, Por Favor, Tu peux tout faire de moi, Quand on n'a que l'amour), amongst many others. He started his musical career in 1956 on the Barclay Records label. His recordings were released in the United States on the Kapp and Four Corners record labels until 1969.

=== Early career ===
He was accepted at the Paris Conservatory when 17 years old. During the early 1950s he played the piano for the Franck Pourcel orchestra. In 1953 he played the piano at the Hilton Hotel in Los Angeles. He started his musical career in 1956 on the Barclay label and recorded his debut album that year.

He worked on the French television programmes Musicorama (1950s) and Palmarés des Chansons (1965, 1966, 1967) accompanying such famous artists as Dalida, Claude François, Richard Anthony, with his own orchestra.

His recording of "The Day the Rains Came" was a best seller in the United States in 1958. The song "Ame câline" (Soul Coaxing) became an international hit in 1968 and "La La La (He Gives Me Love)" – an instrumental adaptation of 1968's Eurovision Song Contest's winning song by Spanish singer Massiel – was a minor hit in 1968 in Canada and the United States. In 1969, his recording of "La Reine de Saba" (Queen of Sheba) became a big hit in Japan. From 1972 until the early 2000s, he undertook several successful tours of Japan.

He worked on the soundtracks of many Louis de Funès movies.

=== Eurovision ===
Lefèvre conducted entries five times at the Eurovision Song Contest, four times for Monaco (in 1960, 1961, 1962, and 1963), and once for Luxembourg in 1970.

=== Death ===
Raymond Lefèvre died in Seine-Port, France on 27 June 2008, at the age of 78.

== Discography ==
=== Film music (excerpt) ===
- 1957 – Fric-frac en dentelles with Peter van Eyck.
- 1964 – Le gendarme de St. Tropez
- 1965 – Le gendarme à New York (with Paul Mauriat)
- 1967 – Les grandes vacances
- 1968 – Le gendarme se marie
- 1970 – Le gendarme en balade
- 1979 – Le gendarme et les extra-terrestres
- 1981 – La soupe aux choux
- 1982 – Le gendarme et les gendarmettes

=== Albums ===
- 1965 – Palmares des chansons
- 1966 – Palmares des chansons No.2
- 1967 – Palmares des chansons No.3
- 1967 – Palmares des chansons No.4
- 1967 – Raymond Lefevre No.5
- 1968 – Raymond Lefèvre No.6
- 1968 – Raymond Lefèvre No.7
- 1968 – Joyeux Noels
- 1968 – Christmas Symphonies
- 1968 – Palmares des chansons
- 1968 – Raymond Lefèvre No.9
- 1969 – Raymond Lefèvre No.10
- 1969 – Musique de films
- 1969 – Great Strauss Waltzes
- 1969 – Raymond Lefèvre Plays the Hits
- 1970 – Raymond Lefèvre No.12
- 1970 – Concerto pour une voix
- 1971 – Raymond Lefèvre No.13
- 1971 – Soul Symphonies
- 1971 – This is Raymond Lefèvre
- 1971 – Golden Prize
- 1972 – Raymond Lefèvre No.14
- 1972 – Raymond Lefèvre No.15
- 1972 – Raymond Lefèvre No.16
- 1972 – Live in Japan
- 1972 – Oh Happy Day
- 1972 – Mamy Blue
- 1973 – Festival de Sanremo 1973
- 1973 – Soul Symphonies No.2
- 1973 – Raymond Lefèvre No.17
- 1974 – Raymond Lefèvre No.18
- 1974 – Raymond Lefèvre No.19
- 1974 – Live in Japan 1974
- 1974 – Best of Raymond Lefèvre
- 1975 – Stereo Laboratory Vol. 10 Strings
- 1975 – Emmanuelle Golden Prize
- 1975 – Raymond Lefèvre No.20
- 1976 – Raymond Lefèvre No.21
- 1976 – French Love in Hi-Fi
- 1976 – Les plus grands succes 76
- 1976 – Love Symphonies
- 1976 – 16 musiques de films
- 1977 – Rock and Rhythm in Hi-Fi
- 1977 – Love in Stereo Nº 1
- 1977 – Live in Japan 1977
- 1977 – El nuevo sonido de Raymond Lefèvre
- 1977 – Eux
- 1978 – Festival des meilleurs musiques des films
- 1978 – Soul Symphonies No.3
- 1978 – Holiday Symphonies
- 1978 – Grandi temi da film
- 1978 – Film Symphonies
- 1978 – Romance
- 1979 – Live in Japan 1978
- 1979 – Tomorrow's Symphonies du Futur
- 1979 – Disco Symphonies
- 1979 – Pop Symphonies
- 1979 – Love World
- 1980 – Concerto
- 1980 – The Best of Raymond Lefèvre
- 1980 – 16 grands succes
- 1981 – Suite latine
- 1982 – Demonstration
- 1982 – Operamania
- 1983 – Digital Parade
- 1984 – Lefèvre Meets Chiharu
- 1984 – Les plus grands succes de Julio Iglesias
- 1984 – Live in Japan 1984
- 1984 – Plays Chinese Songs
- 1986 – Back to Bach
- 1988 – Music of the Night
- 1988 – Les plus grands succes de Raymond Lefèvre Vol. 3
- 1989 – Mull of Kintyre
- 1991 – Canzone
- 1993 – Sous le ciel de Paris
- 1993 – Les plus grands succes de Raymond Lefèvre Vol. 5
- 1995 – Plein soleil
- 1995 – Autumnal Player (When Richard Meets Raymond)
- 1995 – Japon mon amour (with Richard Clayderman)
- 1998 – Lacrima cristi
- 2002 – De temps en temps
- 2009 – Raymond Lefèvre et son Grand Orchestre
- 2010 – A mon pere

=== Singles ===
- The Day That Rains Come (US #30, 1958)
- What God does it to Me (1960)
- Spanish Eyes (1966)
- Groovin' (1967)
- Whiter Shade of Pale (1967)
- Soul Coaxing (US #37, AC #4, 1968)
- La La La (US #110, AC #23, 1968)
- Delilah (1969)
- Mammy Blue (1972)
