= Jean Lefebvre =

French film actor (1919–2004)

Jean Marcel Lefebvre
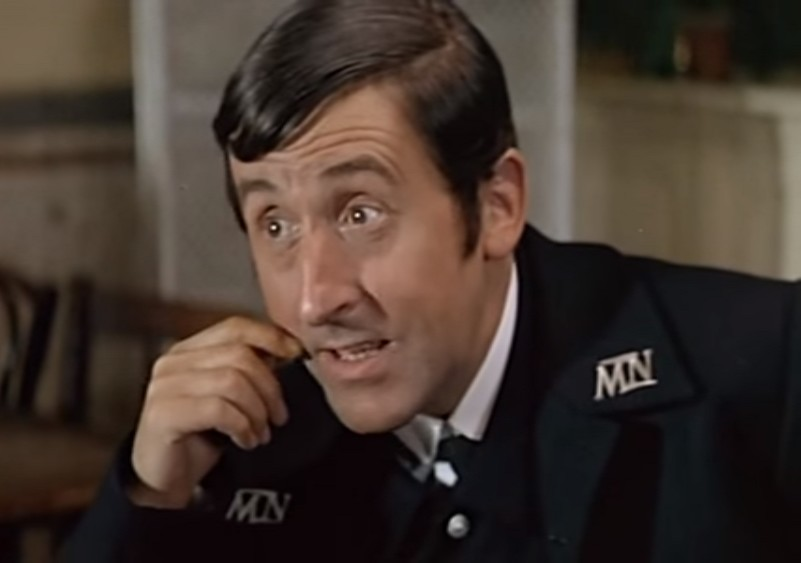
- Lefebvre in The Mona Lisa Has Been Stolen, 1966
- Born: 3 October 1919; Valenciennes, France
- Died: 9 July 2004 (aged 84); Marrakesh, Morocco
- Occupation: Actor

Jean Marcel Lefebvre (3 October 1919 (Note: Some sources indicate he was born in 1922.) – 9 July 2004) was a French film actor.

His erratic studies were interrupted by World War II. Taken prisoner and then requisitioned as a laborer, he escaped to join his family evacuated near Châteauroux and Neuvy-Saint-Sépulcre. He was a tram driver time in Limoges and seller of underwear. At the end of the war he returned to his home, in his house in Valenciennes, where he worked briefly for his father, and then entered the Conservatoire in Paris in 1948.

According to a poll conducted in 1981, he was ranked by the French as their third-favourite comedian, after Louis de Funès and Coluche.

== Selected filmography ==
- 1934: Judex – Roger de Trémeuse
- 1947: Un flic – Un jeune homme chez le coiffeur (uncredited)
- 1951: Bouquet of Joy – Georges
- 1952: A Girl on the Road – Loulou – le pianiste
- 1952: L'amour toujours l'amour – Jacques
- 1955: Les Diaboliques – Le soldat
- 1955: La villa Sans-Souci
- 1955: Cherchez la femme – Joe
- 1955: Gas-Oil – Le chauffeur de car
- 1955: Une fille épatante – Le trombone
- 1955: La Meilleure Part – Raymond – un ouvrier
- 1956: Les Indiscrètes – Laroche
- 1956: The Adventures of Gil Blas – Scipion
- 1956: Naughty Girl – Jérôme's pal
- 1956: The Lebanese Mission – La Pie
- 1956: L'Homme et l'Enfant – Albert
- 1956: And God Created Woman – L'homme qui veut danser
- 1957: The Seventh Commandment – Edouard, le fils d'Amélie
- 1957: Que les hommes sont bêtes – Francis
- 1957: A Friend of the Family – Le Jardinier
- 1957: Méfiez-vous fillettes – Matz
- 1957: Nous autres à Champignol – Un soldat romain / Un roi mérovingien / Henri III / Un mousquetaire / Le zouave du pont de l'Alma / Un homme en exode (uncredited)
- 1957: La Polka des menottes – L'inspecteur Martial
- 1957: Send a Woman When the Devil Fails – Fred
- 1958: Back to the Wall – Mauvin
- 1958: The Amorous Corporal – Potirond
- 1958: Tabarin – Julien
- 1958: En légitime défense – Georges
- 1958: The Daughter of Hamburg – Georges
- 1958: Sunday Encounter – Le réceptionniste
- 1959: Houla-Houla – Le gendarme farfelu
- 1962: Les Moutons de Panurge – Cameo appearance (uncredited)
- 1962: La Belle Américaine – Chougnasse, le chef comptable
- 1962: Les Ennemis – Le médecin du contre-espionnage
- 1962: La Vendetta – Colombo
- 1962: Konga Yo – Jean
- 1962: Love on a Pillow – Armand (uncredited)
- 1962: Gigot – Gaston
- 1962: The Gentleman from Epsom – Charly le "tubeur"
- 1962: Moonlight in Maubeuge – Un mineur
- 1962: Le roi des montagnes – Basile
- 1963: The Bamboo Stroke – L'auvergnat
- 1963: People in Luck – Le marin (segment "Le yacht")
- 1963: Les Grands Chemins – Card Player
- 1963: Les tontons flingueurs – Paul Volfoni
- 1963: Chair de poule – Priest
- 1963: Bébert et l'Omnibus – Balissard
- 1964: Let's Rob the Bank – Le contremaître / The overseer
- 1964: La Mort d'un tueur – Tony
- 1964: Monsieur – Le detective privé
- 1964: Une souris chez les hommes – Le surveillant
- 1964: Paris champagne
- 1964: Relax Darling – Blaise
- 1964: The Troops of St. Tropez – Maréchal des Logis Lucien Fougasse
- 1964: The Counterfeit Constable – Le supporter saoul avec le coq
- 1964: The Gorillas – L'électro
- 1965: Les Copains – Le restaurateur / Waiter
- 1965: La Bonne Occase – Le pompiste
- 1965: The Sleeping Car Murders – (uncredited)
- 1965: When the Pheasants Pass – Arsène Baudu
- 1965: How to Keep the Red Lamp Burning – Léonard Maburon (segment "Procès, Le")
- 1965: Le gendarme à New York – Maréchal des Logis Lucien Fougasse
- 1966: Angelique and the King – L'apothicaire (uncredited)
- 1966: Ne nous fâchons pas – Léonard Michalon
- 1966: Un garçon, une fille. Le dix-septième ciel – Le plongeur
- 1966: The Mona Lisa Has Been Stolen – Gardien
- 1966: Trois enfants dans le désordre – Fernand
- 1966: Le Solitaire passe à l'attaque – Robert Le Goff
- 1967: An Idiot in Paris – Goubi
- 1967: Du mou dans la gâchette – Léon Dubois
- 1967: Le Fou du labo 4 – Eugène Ballanchon
- 1968: Benjamin – Azay (uncredited)
- 1968: Un drôle de colonel – Cutterfeet
- 1968: Le gendarme se marie – Maréchal des Logis Lucien Fougasse
- 1969: Le bourgeois gentil mec – Jean Gentil
- 1970: Le gendarme en balade – Maréchal des Logis Lucien Fougasse
- 1970: L'Âne de Zigliara – Gégé
- 1972: L'ingénu – Abbé de Kerkabon
- 1972: Bluebeard – Greta's Father
- 1972: Treasure Island – Ben Gunn
- 1973: Quelques messieurs trop tranquilles – Julien Michalon
- 1973: Enuff Is Enuff (J'ai mon voyage !) – Jean-Louis Cartier
- 1973: The Mysterious Island
- 1973: La valise – Le bagagiste / Baggage Man
- 1973: Le Solitaire – Un gardien 'La Carlingue'
- 1973: Le Magnifique – The electrician
- 1973: Mais où est donc passé la 7ème compagnie? – Pithivier
- 1974: Le plumard en folie – Adrien
- 1974: Commissariato di notturna – Dindino
- 1974: Comme un pot de fraises – Adrien
- 1974: There's Nothing Wrong with Being Good to Yourself (C'est jeune et ça sait tout) – Charles Lebrun
- 1974: Impossible Is Not French – Louis Brisset
- 1975: C'est pas parce qu'on a rien à dire qu'il faut fermer sa gueule – Riton
- 1975: Pas de problème – Edmond Michalon
- 1975: On a retrouvé la septième compagnie – Pithivier
- 1975: La situation est grave… mais pas désespérée – Bertrand Duvenois
- 1976: Le Jour de gloire – Grégoire
- 1976: Le Chasseur de chez Maxim's – Le chanoine
- 1977: Casanova & Co. – The Sergeant
- 1977: Le maestro – Alexis Kemper
- 1977: La septième compagnie au clair de lune – Pithivier
- 1978: Freddy – Frédéric Corban dit 'Freddy'
- 1978: Ils sont fous ces sorciers – Julien Picard
- 1978: Plein les poches pour pas un rond... – Julien
- 1979: Tendrement vache – Henri Duchemin
- 1979: Duos sur canapé – Victor, le valet
- 1980: Les Borsalini – Momo Bichonnet
- 1981: Le Chêne d'Allouville – Albert Lecourt
- 1981: Prends ta Rolls et va pointer – Camille Vignault
- 1982: N'oublie pas ton père au vestiaire... – Antoine Chevrier
- 1982: On n'est pas sorti de l'auberge – Félix
- 1983: Le Braconnier de Dieu – Vincent Espérandieu
- 1983: Salut la puce – Robert 'Capitaine' Dumourier
- 1985: Le Gaffeur – Gabriel Duchemin
- 1989: À deux minutes près – Le mari de la matrone
- 1989: La Folle Journée ou le Mariage de Figaro – Bazile
- 2001: Fifi Martingale – Gaston Manzanarès
