= Les Grandes Vacances (film) =

- Directed by: Jean Girault
- Written by: Jean Girault; Jacques Vilfrid
- Produced by: Raymond Danon
- Starring: Louis de Funès
- Cinematography: Marcel Grignon
- Edited by: Jean-Michel Gautier
- Music by: Raymond Lefevre
- Distributed by: Valoria Films
- Release date: 1 December 1967
- Running time: 85 minutes
- Countries: France; Italy
- Language: French/English
- Box office: $52.4 million

Les Grandes Vacances (released internationally as The Exchange Student) is a French–Italian comedy movie from 1967, directed by Jean Girault, written by Jacques Vilfrid and starring Louis de Funès.

Aerial unit director and stunt flyer Jean Falloux and a passenger died when they crashed a light plane while attempting to land on a speeding car for this film, which was dedicated to his memory.

== Plot ==
Charles Bosquier is the dictatorial headmaster of a French school. One of his own sons miserably failed his exams, so he sends him to England as an exchange student.

== Cast ==
- Louis de Funès : M. Charles Bosquier
- Claude Gensac : Mme Isabelle Bosquier
- Ferdy Mayne : Mac Farrell
- Martine Kelly : Shirley Mac Farrell
- Jean St Clair : Mrs Mac Farrell
- Olivier de Funès : Gérard Bosquier
- François Leccia : Philippe Bosquier
- Maurice Risch : Stéphane Michonnet
- Jean-Pierre Bertrand : Christian, a friend of Philippe
- René Bouloc : Bargin, the pupil who leaves with Philippe
- Jacques Dublin : Claude, a friend of Philippe
- Dominique Maurin : Michel, a friend of Philippe
- Bernard Le Coq : Jean-Christophe
