= Le Gendarme se marie =

- Poster
- Directed by: Jean Girault
- Written by: Richard Balducci; Jacques Vilfrid; Jean Girault
- Produced by: Rene Pignères; Gérard Beytout
- Starring: Louis de Funès; Geneviève Grad; Michel Galabru; Jean Lefebvre; Christian Marin; Claude Gensac
- Cinematography: Marcel Grignon
- Edited by: Jean-Michel Gautier
- Music by: Raymond Lefèvre
- Distributed by: SNC, Medusa Distribuzione
- Release date: 30 October 1968
- Running time: 88 minutes
- Country: France
- Language: French
- Box office: $51.2 million

Le Gendarme se marie (lit. 'The Gendarme Gets Married') is the third instalment of the Gendarme series, starring again Louis de Funès as Ludovic Cruchot and one more time Geneviève Grad as his daughter. This comedy film succeeds Gendarme in New York and is followed by three further instalments.

== Plot ==
The gendarme Cruchot meets the widow Josepha. They quickly fall in love. But Cruchot's daughter doesn't like Josepha and is determined to prevent the wedding by all means necessary.

== Cast ==
- Louis de Funès: Ludovic Cruchot
- Michel Galabru: Jérôme Gerber
- Jean Lefebvre: Lucien Fougasse
- Christian Marin: Albert Merlot
- Guy Grosso: Gaston Tricard
- Michel Modo: Jules Berlicot
- Geneviève Grad: Nicole Cruchot, daughter of Ludovic Cruchot
- Claude Gensac: Josépha Cruchot
- Mario David: Frédo
- Nicole Vervil: Madame Gerber, Jérôme's wife
- France Rumilly: the nun, "Soeur Clotilde"
- Bernard Lavalette: the dance teacher
