= The Troops of St. Tropez =

1964 French comedy film by Jean Girault

- Film Poster
- Directed by: Jean Girault
- Written by: Richard Balducci; Jean Girault; Jacques Vilfrid
- Produced by: SNC; Franca Films
- Starring: Louis de Funès; Geneviève Grad; Michel Galabru; Jean Lefebvre; Christian Marin
- Music by: Raymond Lefèvre
- Distributed by: SNC
- Release date: 9 September 1964
- Running time: 95 minutes
- Countries: France; Italy
- Language: French
- Box office: 7,809,517 admissions (France)

The Troops of St. Tropez (French: Le Gendarme de Saint-Tropez; literally The Policeman from Saint-Tropez) is a 1964 French comedy film set in Saint-Tropez, a fashionable resort on the French Riviera. Starring Louis de Funès as Ludovic Cruchot of the gendarmerie, the film is the first in the Gendarme series, and spawned five sequels.

== Plot ==
2011 view of Saint-Tropez port, site of arrival sequence in film, with much plot action filmed there.

Ludovic Cruchot (played by Louis de Funès), a highly uptight gendarme in a small French village, has been reassigned to the seaside commune of Saint-Tropez under the orders of Command Sergeant Major Gerber (played by Michel Galabru), who takes no lip from his outspoken new subordinate. His daughter Nicole quickly adapts to the life in the city and, much to Cruchot's traditional-minded chagrin, begins to mix with the local carefree youths who often blatantly defy her father's official authority. However, they ridicule her at first, so she states her father is a rich American named Ferguson who has arrived to the port with his yacht. He also owns a red Mustang.

Soon, the gendarmes find themselves confronted with a major problem: a group of persistent nudists. Any attempts to arrest them in flagrante delicto are foiled by a lookout; but after several failures, Cruchot manages to hatch a master plan and succeeds in getting all the nude swimmers arrested.

Later, Cruchot discovers that his daughter and her new boyfriend have stolen and crashed Ferguson's Mustang into a ditch, puncturing a tyre in the process. Unbeknownst to any of them, Ferguson and his teammates are a gang of robbers who have stolen a Rembrandt painting, which is still in the trunk. Cruchot manages to get the car out, but realizes that the objects he threw out of the car to fix a puncture, including the painting, are valuable items.

The man who pretends to own the painting then kidnaps Cruchot, but Nicole and her friends knock out the group that kidnapped her father, and the painting is returned to its rightful owner.

== Cast ==
- Louis de Funès: Ludovic Cruchot
- Geneviève Grad: Nicole Cruchot, daughter of Ludovic
- Michel Galabru: warrant officer Jérôme Gerber
- Jean Lefebvre: gendarme Lucien Fougasse
- Christian Marin: gendarme Albert Merlot
- Guy Grosso: gendarme Gaston Tricard
- Michel Modo: gendarme Jules Berlicot
- France Rumilly: sister Clotilde
- Daniel Cauchy: one of the youths St-Tropez

== Reception ==
The film was the most popular movie at the French box office in 1964.

== Museum ==
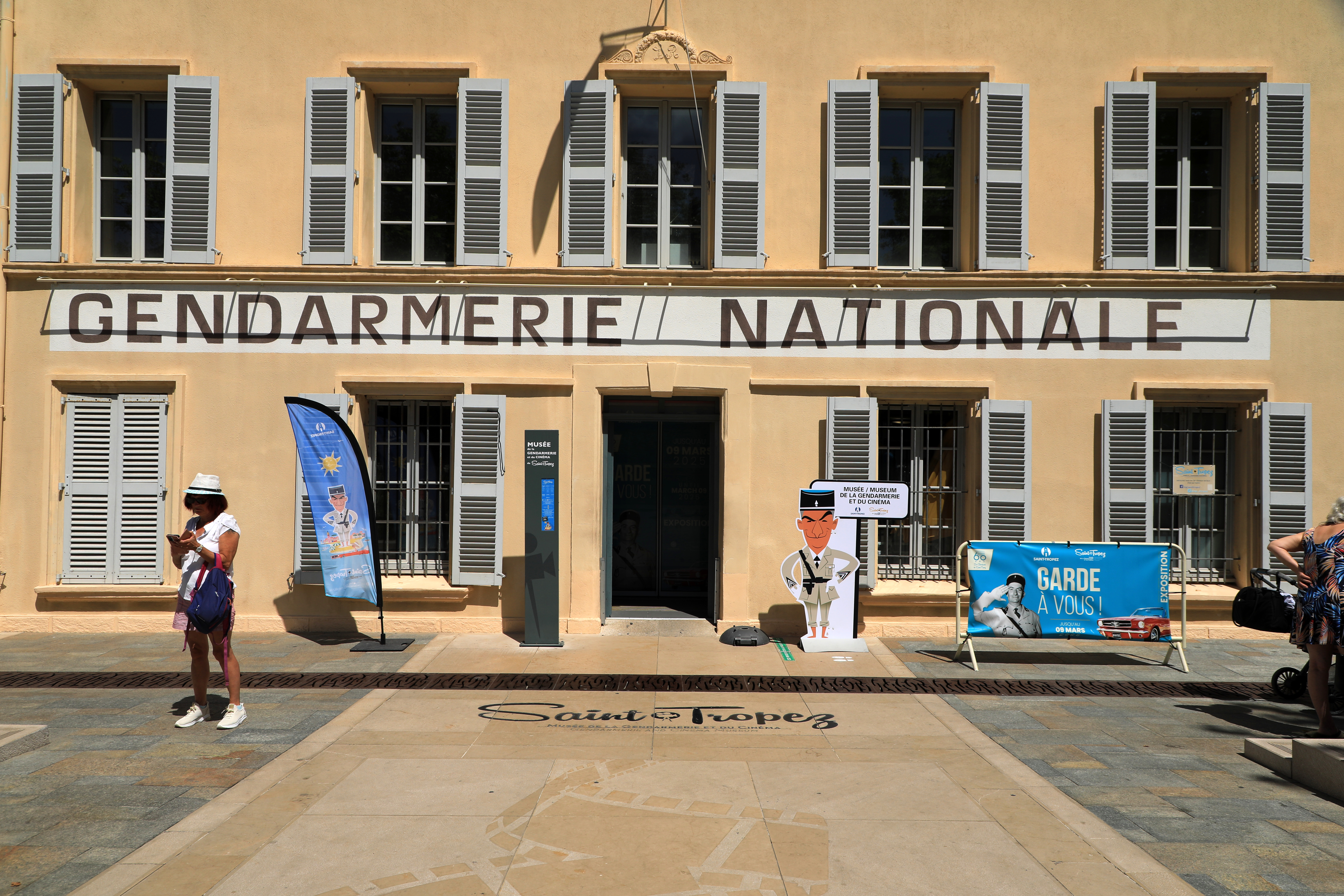
Old gendarmerie headquarters turned into a museum in Saint-Tropez

A museum dedicated to the gendarmerie and cinema in Saint-Tropez – Musée de la Gendarmerie et du Cinema de Saint-Tropez – has been in operation since 2016.

The museum is located in the building that housed the real Saint-Tropez gendarmerie from 1879 until 2003. The museum exhibits are largely dedicated to the Gendarme series as well as other films made in Saint-Tropez, including And God Created Woman which starred Brigitte Bardot. In 2024, the museum celebrated the 60th anniversary of The Troops of St. Tropez with a special temporary exhibition.
