= Le Gendarme et les Gendarmettes =

- Directed by: Jean Girault; Tony Aboyantz
- Written by: Richard Balducci; Jean Girault; Jacques Vilfrid
- Produced by: Gérard Beytout
- Starring: Louis de Funès; Michel Galabru; Claude Gensac; Maurice Risch
- Music by: Raymond Lefèvre
- Distributed by: SNC
- Release date: 6 October 1982 (France)
- Running time: 95 minutes
- Country: France
- Language: French
- Box office: $31.6 million

Le Gendarme et les Gendarmettes (lit. 'The Gendarme and the Gendarmettes'), also known in English as Never Play Clever Again or The Troops & Troop-ettes, is a 1982 French comedy film, and the sixth and last movie of the Gendarme series. It is the final film of the director Jean Girault and the lead actor Louis de Funès, both of which were involved in the series since its very first film in 1964.

== Synopsis ==
Four young beautiful female police officers come to learn from the "masters" but it turns out they are coping much better with the problem than their teachers. But things heat up when the "gendarmettes" are kidnapped one by one.

== Auto stunt scene ==
Reminiscent of the motorcycle stunt driving scene in the 1968 installment Le gendarme se marie, France Rumilly featured again as the stunt driving nun, "Soeur Clotilde", this time in a spectacular and comedic scene, driving a Citroën 2CV, a year after James Bond drove a 2CV in For Your Eyes Only, but including the gag whereby the car breaks up in two pieces, and the driver continues driving the front-wheel drive front half of the car, three years before this gag is repeated by James Bond in a Renault 11, in the 1985 film A View to a Kill.
