= Jean Girault =

French film director (1924–1982)

- Born: 9 May 1924; Villenauxe-la-Grande, Grand Est, France
- Died: 20 July 1982 (aged 58); Paris, France
- Years active: 1952–1982
- Spouse: Françoise Jourdanet (1946–2019)

Jean Girault (French pronunciation: [ʒɑ̃ ʒiʁo]; 9 May 1924 – 20 July 1982) was a French film director and screenwriter. From 1951 to 1960 he worked as a screenwriter, mainly for comedy films. He made his film debut as a director in 1960. He directed more than thirty films between 1960 and 1982. In 1982, he died of tuberculosis at the age of 58.

== Filmography ==
Director

- Les pique-assiette (1960)
- Les Moutons de Panurge (1960)
- Les Livreurs (1961)
- People in Luck (1963)
- Les Bricoleurs (1963)
- Pouic-Pouic (1963)
- Let's Rob the Bank (1964)
- The Troops of St. Tropez (1964)
- The Gorillas (1964)
- Gendarme in New York (1965)
- Monsieur le président-directeur général (1966)
- Les grandes vacances (1967)
- A Strange Kind of Colonel (1968)
- Le gendarme se marie (1968)
- La maison de campagne (1969)
- Le gendarme en balade (1970)
- Le Juge (1971)
- Jo (1971)
- Les charlots font l'Espagne (1972)
- Le concierge (1973)
- Le permis de conduire (1974)
- Deux grandes filles dans un pyjama (1974)
- Les murs ont des oreilles (1974)
- L'intrépide (1975)
- L'Année sainte (1976)
- Le mille-pattes fait des claquettes (1977)
- L'horoscope (1978)
- The Gendarme and the Extra-Terrestrials (1979)
- L'Avare (1980)
- Ach du lieber Harry (1981)
- La Soupe aux choux (1981)
- Le gendarme et les gendarmettes (1982; released posthumously)

Writer

- Un jour avec vous (1952)
