= Michel Galabru =

French actor (1922–2016)

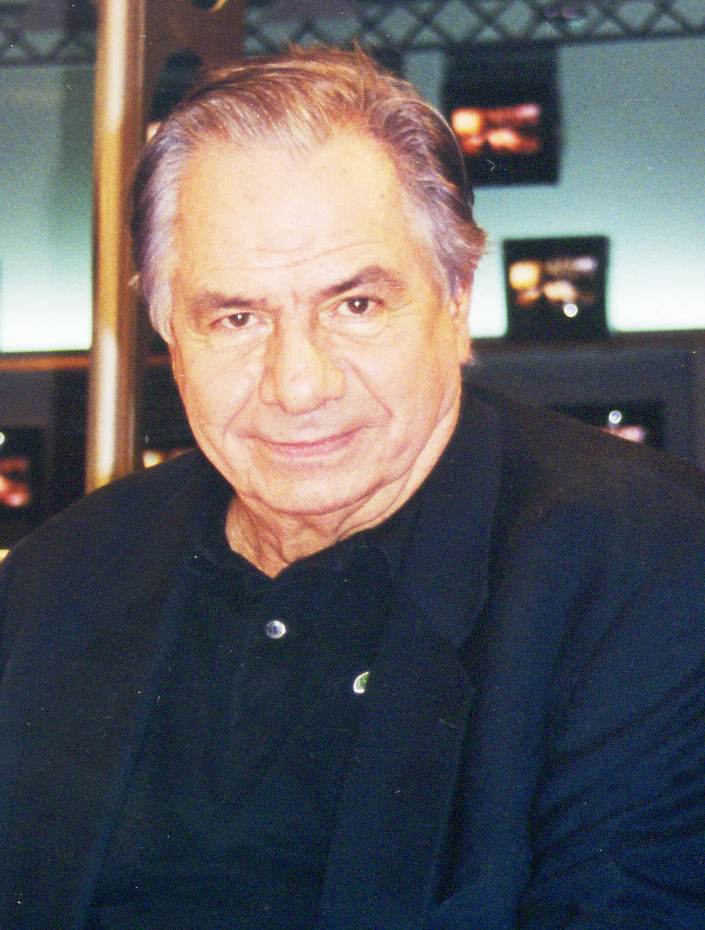
- Galabru in 1999
- Born: 27 October 1922; Safi, French protectorate in Morocco
- Died: 4 January 2016 (aged 93); Paris, France
- Occupation: Actor
- Years active: 1949–2016

Michel Louis Edmond Galabru (27 October 1922 – 4 January 2016) was a French actor.

== Career ==
Galabru appeared in more than 250 films and worked with directors such as Bertrand Blier, Costa-Gavras, Luc Besson (for Subway), and Jean-Luc Godard.

He is also well known for his collaborations with Louis de Funès in Le gendarme de Saint-Tropez, Le gendarme se marie, Le gendarme et les extra-terrestres, Le gendarme en balade, Le gendarme à New York, Le gendarme et les gendarmettes, Le petit baigneur, L'avare, Jo (film) and Nous irons a Deauville (with Michel Serrault).

He worked with the actors Ugo Tognazzi and Michel Serrault in La Cage aux Folles, La Cage aux Folles II, and La Cage aux Folles 3: The Wedding; and Le viager.

== Selected filmography ==
Year	Title	Role	Notes
1948	La bataille du feu	Extra - A firefighter	Uncredited
1949	Dernière heure, édition spéciale	M. Mercier, le réceptionniste de l'hôtel	Uncredited
1952	My Wife, My Cow and Me		
1954	Les Lettres de mon moulin	Baptistin	
1956	Trois de la Canebière	Dans le rôle de Pénible	
1958	Suivez-moi jeune homme	Aristide Oranos	
1959	The Indestructible	Augustin Robustal	
1959	Du rififi chez les femmes	The Belgian firefighter	
1960	Les Mordus	Fred	
1961	Un soir sur la plage	Le commissaire	
1961	La Fayette	The hostel warden	
1962	War of the Buttons	Bacaillé's father	
1962	We Will Go to Deauville	Monsieur Mercier, the boss	
1964	Le Gendarme de Saint-Tropez	Jérôme Gerber	
1965	Angelique and the King	Bontemps	
1965	Gendarme in New York	Jérôme Gerber	
1966	Brigade antigangs	Larmeno	
1967	The Little Bather	Scipion	
1968	Le gendarme se marie	Jérôme Gerber	
1970	Le gendarme en balade	Jérôme Gerber	
1971	Jo	Monsieur Tonelotti	
1972	Le Viager	Léon Gallipeau	
1972	Les joyeux lurons	Bossuet	
1973	La dernière bourrée à Paris	Jules Payrac	
1973	Le Grand Bazar	Émile	
1973	The Judge and the Assassin	Joseph Bouvier	
1973	Group Portrait with a Lady	Walter Pelzer	
1973	Oh, If Only My Monk Would Want (Ah! Si mon moine voulait...)		
1974	Les Vacanciers	Aloyse Frankensteinmuhl	
1974	Y'a un os dans la moulinette	Émile	
1974	Section spéciale	President Cournet	
1974	No Pockets in a Shroud	Thomas	
1974	There's Nothing Wrong with Being Good to Yourself (C'est jeune et ça sait tout)	Mr. Lambris	
1976	Le Trouble-fesses	Eugène Lajoux	
1976	The Porter from Maxim's	Julien	
1977	The Cat	Inspector Francisci	
1977	Le beaujolais nouveau est arrivé	The captain	
1977	L'Amour en herbe	Morel	
1978	La Cage aux folles	Simon Charrier	
1979	Le gendarme et les extra-terrestres	Jérôme Gerber	
1979	Le Guignolo	Achille Sureau	
1979	Cop or Hood	Commissioner Grimaud	
1980	La Cage aux Folles II	Simon Charrier	
1980	L'Avare	Maître Jacques	
1980	Les sous-doués	The Police Commissioner	
1980	I'm Photogenic	Del Giudice, the producer	
1981	Le bahut va craquer	The Principal	
1982	Le gendarme et les gendarmettes	Jérôme Gerber	
1983	One Deadly Summer	Gabriel, Eliane's father	
1983	Papy fait de la résistance	Jean-Robert Bourdelle, aka "Papy"	
1983	Le Braconnier de Dieu	Hilaire	
1984	Adam et Ève	Léon Blachurpe, le producteur	
1984	Notre histoire	Emile Pecqueur	
1984	La triche	Jean Morane / Sylvain Morane	
1984	Les fausses confidences	M. Rémy	
1984	Réveillon chez Bob	Douglas	
1984	Partenaires	Charlie	
1984	Le gendarme et l'empereur	Alphonse Gerber	
1984	Du sel sur la peau	Bideau	
1985	The Telephone Always Rings Twice	Marraine	
1985	Tranches de vie	The farmer	
1985	Subway	Le Commissaire Gesberg	
1985	Monsieur de Pourceaugnac	Monsieur de Pourceaugnac	
1985	Le Facteur de Saint-Tropez	Charles de Lespinasse	
1985	Ne prends pas les poulets pour des pigeons	Commissaire Dufresne	
1985	La Cage aux Folles 3: The Wedding	Simon Charrier	
1986	Suivez mon regard	L'instituteur	
1986	Je hais les acteurs	Bison	
1986	The Joint Brothers	Le père de Momo	
1986	Kamikaze	Albert	
1986	L'enfant de colère	Camille	
1987	Grand Guignol	Charlie	
1987	Poule et frites	Martinez	
1987	Keep Your Right Up	The Admiral	
1988	Envoyez les violons	Dino Pizzoli	
1989	La Révolution française	Maury, the clergyman	(segment "Années Lumière, Les")
1989	Sans défense	Jules Rampin	
1989	L'invité surprise	Le Boureux	
1989	La folle journée ou Le mariage de Figaro	Bartholo	
1990	Le silence d'ailleurs	Henri	
1990	Le dénommé (Oublie que tu es un homme)	Le juge d'instruction	
1990	Le provincial	Ernest Cazavant	
1990	Feu sur le candidat	Robert Cavaillon	
1990	Uranus	Monglat	
1991	Le jour des rois	Georges	
1992	Room Service	Fernand Castanier	
1992	Les eaux dormantes	Fouchard	
1992	Belle Époque	Danglard	
1996	My Man	A client of Marie	
1996	Rainbow pour Rimbaud	Le père	
1998	Que la lumière soit	Southern God	
1998	Foul Play	Michel Galabru	
1999	Asterix & Obelix Take On Caesar	Abraracourcix, the chieftain	
1999	Les infortunes de la beauté	Un homme sondé	Uncredited
2000	Les Acteurs	The killed actor	
2003	Raining Cats and Frogs	Roger	Voice
2003	The Car Keys	L'instituteur	
2004	Nuit noire	Le père	
2004	San-Antonio	Achille	
2004	Le Silence de la Mer	André Larosière	TV movie
2005	The Magic Roundabout	Zabadie	Voice, Uncredited
2006	Antonio Vivaldi, un prince à Venise	Le Pape Benoît XIII	
2008	Bienvenue chez les Ch'tis	Julie's grand uncle	
2008	The Maiden and the Wolves	Albert Garcin	
2008	Bouquet final	M. Froissard	
2009	Neuilly sa mère!	The senator	
2009	Le Petit Nicolas	The National Secretary of Education	
2009	Cinéman	Le docteur	
2010	Mumu	Gatineau	
2010	Love Like Poison	Jean Falguères	
2012	La Mémoire dans la chair	Don Pablo	
2013	Les invincibles	Louis Cabanel	
2016	Open at Night	Himself	Posthumous release

== Awards ==
In 1977, Galabru received a César for Best Actor for his portrayal of Joseph Bouvier in Bertrand Tavernier's The Judge and the Assassin.
