= Les Bidasses s'en vont en guerre =

- Theatrical release poster
- Directed by: Claude Zidi
- Written by: Claude Zidi
- Produced by: Christian Fechner
- Starring: Les Charlots; Paolo Stoppa; Jacques Seiler; Marisa Merlini
- Cinematography: Paul Bonis
- Edited by: Robert Isnardon; Monique Isnardon
- Music by: Paul Piot
- Distributed by: AMLF
- Release date: 11 December 1974
- Running time: 85 minutes
- Country: France
- Language: French

Les Bidasses s'en vont en guerre (lit. 'The soldiers go to war') is a 1974 French comedy film directed by Claude Zidi. It is the sequel of the director's first film Les Bidasses en folie.

== Plot ==
Gérard, Jean, Phil and Jean-Guy are in the Army, but the Sergeant Bellec who train them do not leave them. The four friends who prefer passing their time playing cards in prison, they remain making all kinds of pranks and are reprimanded, like when they are in charge of re-heating the pool of the Colonel.

By mistake, they send fuel oil in the pool, flood the cave of the Colonel with fuel oil, where they end stuck with the Sergeant and the Colonel. One day, they find a way to escape and take refuge in a farm that the Army wants to requisition because it is located on one of its grounds.

They will help the owners before saying "yes" (or more "no") in front of the Mayor at the wedding ceremony.

== Cast ==
- Les Charlots :
- Gérard Rinaldi as Gérard
- Gérard Filippelli as Phil
- Jean Sarrus as Jean
- Jean-Guy Fechner as Jean-Guy
- Jacques Seiler as Sergeant Bellec
- Marisa Merlini as Paulette Brugnon, the farmer
- Heidy Bohlen as the Lieutenant psychologist
- Paolo Stoppa as Colonel Hubert de Bouise de Castelnault de la Rochepont
- Myriam Boyer as Philippine Brugnon, Paulette's daughter
- Brigitte Stein]] as Paulette's other daughter
- Pierre Gualdi]] as the Mayor
- Alain Peysson as le fiancé
- André Tomasi as peasant repairman #1
- Michel Fremont as peasant repairman #2
- Jacques Robiolles as the Lieutenant
- Jean-Paul Farré as the peddler tie seller

== Box-office ==
- Soviet Union : 50,100,000 entries
- France : 4,154,509 entries
