= Les Rois du gag =

- Directed by: Claude Zidi
- Screenplay by: Michel Fabre; Didier Kaminka; Claude Zidi
- Produced by: Claude Zidi
- Starring: Michel Serrault; Gérard Jugnot; Thierry Lhermitte
- Music by: Vladimir Cosma
- Distributed by: AMLF
- Release date: 6 March 1985
- Running time: 98 minutes
- Country: France
- Language: French

Les Rois du gag (lit. 'Kings of gags') is a 1985 French comedy film directed by Claude Zidi and starring Michel Serrault (in a dual role), Gérard Jugnot and Thierry Lhermitte. It tells the story of two struggling comedians who get hired as writers and partners by a famous colleague whose work they originally despised.

== Plot ==
Paul Martin and François Leroux, two brothers-in-law and flatmates, try to make a career as comedians. Mainstream success eludes them and they perform their routines in small venues. Meanwhile, Gaëtan, an older comedian, enjoys great success with his monthly TV show. He is, however, unhappy in his private life: even though he has made his family wealthy, his snobbish wife Jacqueline despises his work and cares only for auteur cinema, especially the films of her favorite director Robert Wellson.

Paul and François are annoyed by Gaëtan's prominence, both out of jealousy and because they find his material outdated. During the latest broadcast of his show, they make multiple prank calls to the TV station, posing as outraged viewers. Gaëtan pretends not to care about those calls, but is worried that his material has become stale. He fires his two aging gagmen and decides to seek input from new, younger talent.

Later on, Paul and François perform in a small suburban theatre. Gaëtan has come to see Georges, the comedian whose act comes next, and ends up attending their show. When his presence is noticed among the audience he steals all the attention, ruining Paul and François' act. They are initially furious, only to be delighted when Gaëtan hires them on the spot as writers and then skips Georges' act.

On the day Paul and François sign their contracts at Gaëtan's home, an enraged Georges intrudes with a gun. He takes Gaëtan's daughter, Alexandra, hostage, but François saves the day. François later begins a relationship with Alexandra.

François and Paul gradually develop a good working relationship with Gaëtan. They brainstorm various comedy skits with him as he prepares his next TV show, which will be broadcast live. Gaëtan gives them increasing prominence and wants to make them his new permanent partners.

Robert Wellson arrives in Paris with much fanfare, to begin production on his new film. He develops a curiosity about Gaëtan: just before the show starts, he summons Gaëtan whom he informs that he has chosen him to play the lead in his film.

The promise of success, and the prospect of at last impressing his wife, immediately go to Gaëtan's head. To François and Paul's dismay, he becomes reluctant to be funny, then outright sabotages the show and ends up announcing his retirement from comedy on live television.

Principal photography begins for Wellson's new film. On the first day of filming, the temperamental director becomes unhappy with Gaëtan's acting, fires him and decides to play the role himself. Jacqueline rejects Gaëtan for his failure. Gaëtan reconciles with Paul and François, and decides to start over with them.

== Cast ==
- Michel Serrault as Gaëtan / Robert Wellson
- Gérard Jugnot as Paul Martin
- Thierry Lhermitte as François Leroux
- Macha Méril as Jacqueline
- Mathilda May as Alexandra
- Didier Kaminka as René
- Coluche as Georges
- Maurice Baquet as Robert
- Pierre Doris as Jean
- Carole Jacquinot as Catherine Martin
- Ticky Holgado as man who files a claim for injuries
- Pierre Tchernia as himself, hosting the Césars Awards ceremony
- Claude Brasseur, Philippe Noiret and Pierre Richard as themselves (guests at the César Awards)

== Production ==
The script was originally developed as one of Zidi's projects with the comedy team Les Charlots. When Michel Serrault, who had made Le Grand Bazar with Zidi in 1973, suggested that they work again together, Zidi decided to use this old script, which he rewrote with Didier Kaminka.

The script contained personal elements from Zidi, whose films were often underappreciated by critics and, as a response, wanted to defend comedy and make fun of "intellectual" cinema. As in its story, the film brought together French comedy performers from different generations: Thierry Lhermitte and Gérard Jugnot had become popular in the late 1970s as members of Le Splendid troupe, while Michel Serrault had originally gained fame as a comedian during the 1950s. The character of Gaëtan and his TV show were a pastiche of the French television comedy programs hosted by Stéphane Collaro and Jacques Martin during the 1980s, as well as The Benny Hill Show which was also popular in France at the time. The comedy skits seen in the film were intended as a satire of these shows' broad humor.

The character of "genius" director Robert Wellson has been interpreted as a parody of Orson Welles, with traits reminiscent of Jean-Luc Godard and Federico Fellini, though Zidi has also likened him to Marco Ferreri.

Shortly before principal photography began, Serrault told Zidi that he had lost interest in the film. He was nevertheless contractually bound to do it. Zidi later said that, with hindsight, he should have started over and made the film with another actor.

During the filming of Les Rois du gag, the film My New Partner (Les Ripoux) which Claude Zidi had directed a few months earlier, was released and became a major box-office hit, also earning several César Awards including Best film and Best director. Claude Zidi had included a scene at the César Awards in Les Rois du gag, which became a case of life imitating art.

== Reception ==
Les Rois du gag was released several weeks after the triumph of My New Partner at the César Awards. Upon release, it became number one at the box office, bypassing My New Partner which was still being played in theaters.

However, the film experienced a significant box office drop on the next week, and was bypassed by My New Partner. Zidi therefore found himself in the unique situation of beating himself twice at the box office in two weeks. Though Les Rois du gag performed well commercially, selling over 1,5 million admissions, it was ultimately much less successful than My New Partner. The film was also poorly received by critics, with some joking that Zidi was going back to normal by making a bad film.

The film was a success in the Soviet Union, where it sold 13.2 million admissions.

== Legacy ==
While successful upon its release, Les Rois du gag did not remain as popular over time as other French comedies from the same era.

Zidi later expressed dissatisfaction with the film, commenting that he found the later part with Wellson meandering and that the idea of a comedian wanting to be taken seriously was boring. Lhermitte also said that he had found the film disappointing, though he later came to appreciate it.

In a September 2014 survey regarding the highest prime-time movie ratings on French television since 1989, Médiamétrie reported that Les Rois du gag was watched by 13.24 million viewers on April 4, 1989, ranking 19th among the highest-rated broadcasts. When he was reminded of this in an interview, Zidi remained modest and attributed this viewership to the limited number of channels in France at the time, and to the lack of appeal of the other programs on that day: a challenging documentary on disability, and a political program featuring Raymond Barre.

== Home media ==
The film was released on VHS, then later on DVD in 2003, and later on Blu-ray in 2024. It was also released on VOD on several streaming services including UniversCiné and Canal+.
