= Richard Bonnot =

French singer and actor (1957–2025)

Richard Bonnot (French: [ʁiʃaʁ bɔno]; 14 November 1957 – 28 October 2025) was a French singer, musician, and actor. He was a member of Les Charlots, replacing Gérard Rinaldi, from 1987 to 1997 and then during reformations between 2014 and 2025.

Bonnot died on 28 October 2025, at the age of 67. His death came just eight months after that of Jean Sarrus, another leading figure of the band.
