= Daniel Prévost =

French actor, comedian and writer (born 1939)

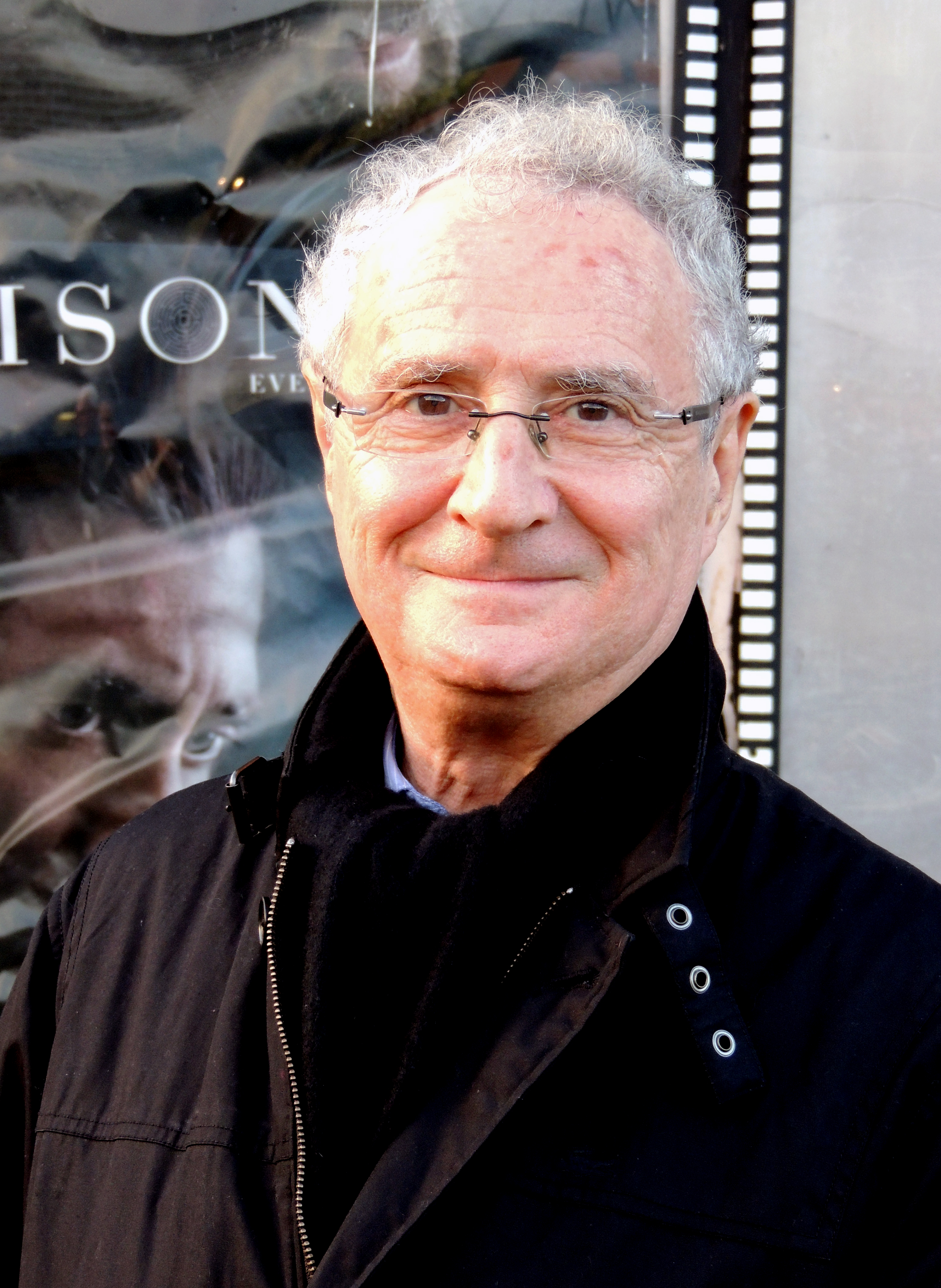
- Daniel Prévost in 2013
- Born: 20 October 1939 (age 87); Garches, France
- Occupations: Actor writer
- Years active: 1961–present

Daniel Prévost (French: [danjɛl pʁevo]; born 20 October 1939) is a French actor, comedian and writer.

== Early life ==
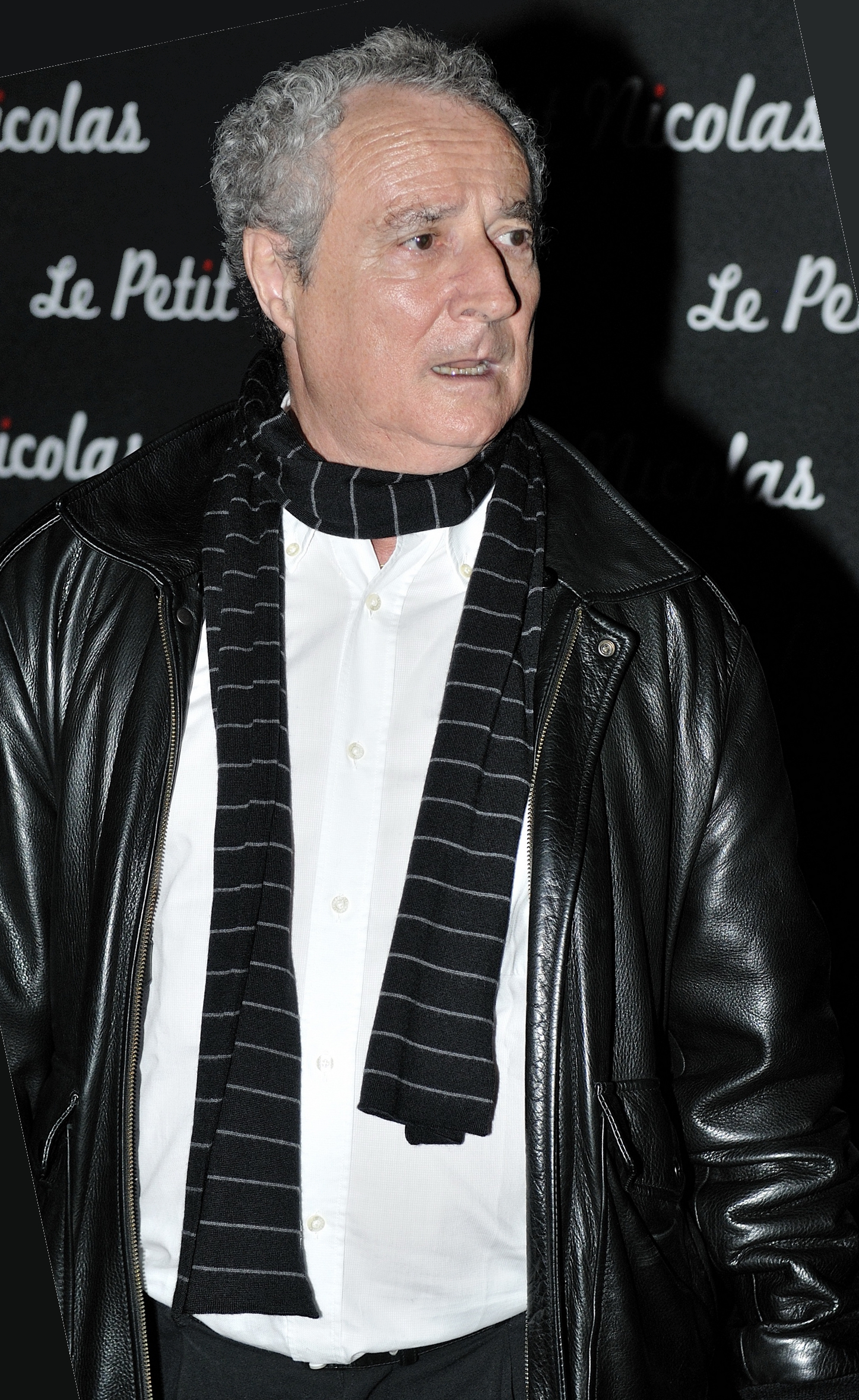
Daniel Prévost in 2009

Daniel Prévost, alias Denis Forestier, was born to Micheline Chevalier and Mohand Ait Salem. His father was of Berber descent from Algeria (Kabylie region), a fact which he did not discover until later life.

== Personal life ==
He is the father of actors Sören Prévost, Erling Prévost and Christophe Prévost.

== Career ==
After attending drama school in Paris, Prévost made his theatre début alongside the likes of Michel Serrault in Un certain M. Blot. In his early beginnings he both performed alongside Boby Lapointe and became acquainted with Jean Yanne, later becoming one of the latter's favourite actors.

Although his television and cinema career began in the 1960s, it was in the 1970s that he found fame through Jacques Martin's satirical news programme Le petit rapporteur, the part for which he is best known.

He excelled as an evilly leering tax inspector – "he'd audit his own mother" in Francis Veber's 1998 comedy Le Dîner de Cons for which he won the César Award for best supporting actor.

== Filmography ==
| Year | Title | Role | Director | Notes |
|---|---|---|---|---|
| 1966 | King of Hearts | Le Général Vallemat | Philippe de Broca | |
| 1969 | Erotissimo | The seller | Gérard Pirès | |
| 1969 | La fête des mères | | Gérard Pirès (2) | Short |
| 1970 | Les voisins n'aiment pas la musique | | Jacques Fansten | Short |
| 1970 | Les saintes chéries | The steed | Jean Becker & Nicole de Buron | TV series (3 episodes) |
| 1971 | Laisse aller... c'est une valse | Pierre | Georges Lautner | |
| 1971 | Caméléons | Mario | René Couderc | |
| 1972 | Tout le monde il est beau, tout le monde il est gentil | Sylvestre Ringeard | Jean Yanne | |
| 1972 | Elle cause plus, elle flingue | The inspector | Michel Audiard | |
| 1972 | Aujourd'hui à Paris | | Pierre Tchernia | TV movie |
| 1973 | La dernière bourrée à Paris | Philippe | Raoul André | |
| 1973 | I Don't Know Much, But I'll Say Everything | Morel | Pierre Richard | |
| 1973 | Le concierge | Daniel | Jean Girault | |
| 1973 | Moi y'en a vouloir des sous | Rozales | Jean Yanne (2) | |
| 1973 | Elle court, elle court la banlieue | The SNCF employee | Gérard Pirès (3) | |
| 1974 | Chinese in Paris | Albert Fontanes | Jean Yanne (3) | |
| 1974 | Comment réussir quand on est con et pleurnichard | Carducci | Michel Audiard (2) | |
| 1974 | Juliette et Juliette | The photographer's friend | Remo Forlani | |
| 1974 | Le permis de conduire | The second monitor | Jean Girault (2) | |
| 1974 | Y'a un os dans la moulinette | Bob | Raoul André (2) | |
| 1974 | La gueule de l'emploi | Daniel Prévost | Jacques Rouland | |
| 1974 | La bonne nouvelle | Albert | André Weinfeld | Short |
| 1975 | Trop c'est trop | | Didier Kaminka | |
| 1976 | La situation est grave... mais pas désespérée | Inspector Landrin | Jacques Besnard | |
| 1976 | Cours après moi ... que je t'attrape | Champfrein | Robert Pouret | |
| 1976 | Un mari, c'est un mari | Lucien | Serge Friedman | |
| 1977 | Ne me touchez pas... | Paratino | Richard Guillon | |
| 1977 | Les folies Offenbach | Lépine | Michel Boisrond | TV mini-series |
| 1978 | Le tumulte d'Amboise | Ruggieri | Serge Friedman (2) | TV movie |
| 1979 | The Associate | Zephir | René Gainville | |
| 1979 | Rien ne va plus | The trade unionist | Jean-Michel Ribes | |
| 1979 | Je te tiens, tu me tiens par la barbichette | Dache | Jean Yanne (4) | |
| 1980 | Sacrés gendarmes | The young cop | Bernard Launois | |
| 1980 | Voulez-vous un bébé Nobel ? | Jean-Philippe Hiagault | Robert Pouret (2) | |
| 1981 | Fais gaffe à la gaffe ! | Prunus | Paul Boujenah | |
| 1983 | Mon curé chez les Thaïlandaises | General Choko | Robert Thomas | |
| 1983 | Adieu foulards | The medium | Christian Lara | |
| 1983 | Prends ton passe-montagne, on va à la plage | Antoine Mazin | Eddy Matalon | |
| 1983 | Ça va pas être triste | Monsieur Lambert | Pierre Sisser | |
| 1983 | Merci Bernard | | Jean-Michel Ribes (2) | TV series (1 episode) |
| 1984 | Remembering Mel | | Doug Harris | |
| 1984 | L'appartement | Luc Badu | Dominique Giuliani | TV series (1 episode) |
| 1985 | Tranches de vie | TV Host | François Leterrier | |
| 1985 | Liberté, égalité, choucroute | The vizier | Jean Yanne (5) | |
| 1985 | Vive le fric | The banker | Raphaël Delpard | |
| 1989 | Palace | Bertrand de Bergounioux | Jean-Michel Ribes (3) | TV series (1 episode) |
| 1990 | Uranus | Rochard | Claude Berri | Nominated – César Award for Best Supporting Actor |
| 1990 | Drôle de couple | Charlie | Patrick Bureau | TV movie |
| 1990 | On dînera au lit | Victor | Georges Folgoas | TV movie |
| 1991 | L'huissier | Saint-Yves | Pierre Tchernia (2) | TV movie |
| 1991 | Myster Mocky présente | Robert | Jean-Pierre Mocky | TV series (1 episode) |
| 1992 | Dark at Noon | The monk | Raúl Ruiz | |
| 1992 | Ville à vendre | Captain Georges Montier | Jean-Pierre Mocky (2) | |
| 1992 | Room Service | Franck | Georges Lautner (2) | |
| 1992 | Pognon sur rue | Michel Grimault | Jean-Louis Bertucelli | TV movie |
| 1992 | Bienvenue à Bellefontaine | Robert | Gérard Louvin | TV movie |
| 1993 | Une journée chez ma mère | The sewerman | Dominique Cheminal | |
| 1994 | Colonel Chabert | Boucard | Yves Angelo | |
| 1994 | Les faussaires | Verdouillet | Frédéric Blum | |
| 1994 | La faute | | Karel Prokop | Short |
| 1994 | La guerre des privés | Fracher | Josée Dayan & Jean-Pierre Prévost | TV series (3 episodes) |
| 1995 | Les hommes et les femmes sont faits pour vivre heureux... mais pas ensemble | Kerman | Philippe de Broca | TV movie |
| 1995 | Le combat des reines | Gustave | Pierre-Antoine Hiroz | TV movie |
| 1996 | The Best Job in the World | Albert Constantini | Gérard Lauzier | |
| 1996 | Ma femme me quitte | Jérémie Duvernois | Didier Kaminka (2) | |
| 1996 | La rançon du chien | Max Ducasse | Peter Kassovitz | TV movie |
| 1996 | Les Cinq Dernières Minutes | Commissioner Larcher | Jean Marboeuf | TV series (1 episode) |
| 1997 | Tenue correcte exigée | M. Bardon | Philippe Lioret | |
| 1997 | Le comédien | The actor | Christian de Chalonge | |
| 1997 | Droit dans le mur | Lucchino | Pierre Richard (2) | |
| 1997 | Violetta la reine de la moto | Kléber | Guy Jacques | |
| 1997 | Le commando des pièces à trous | M. Clément | Pierrot De Heusch | Short |
| 1997 | La nuit de l'invasion des nains de jardins venus de l'espace | The voice | Dylan Pelot | Short |
| 1997 | Faussaires et assassins | Goudeloup | Peter Kassovitz (2) | TV movie |
| 1998 | The Dinner Game | Lucien Cheval | Francis Veber | César Award for Best Supporting Actor |
| 1998 | Un grand cri d'amour | Léon | Josiane Balasko | |
| 1999 | Asterix & Obelix Take On Caesar | Prolix | Claude Zidi | |
| 2000 | Vive nous ! | Alain Leroy | Camille de Casabianca | |
| 2000 | Les insaisissables | Grimbert | Christian Gion | |
| 2000 | Uppercut | The old | Patrice Jourdan & Sören Prévost | Short |
| 2000 | Charmants voisins | Daniel Berger | Claudio Tonetti | TV movie |
| 2001 | A Crime in Paradise | Lawyer Miramont | Jean Becker (2) | |
| 2001 | La vérité si je mens ! 2 | Vierhouten | Thomas Gilou | |
| 2001 | Le soleil au-dessus des nuages | Jean Michaud | Eric Le Roch | |
| 2001 | La cape et l'épée | The minstrel | Jean-Jacques Amsellem | TV series (1 episode) |
| 2002 | Whatever You Say | M. Balbot | Guillaume Canet | |
| 2002 | Coup franc indirect | | Youcef Hamidi | |
| 2002 | Raisons économiques | The 50 years old | Patrice Jourdan & Sören Prévost (2) | Short |
| 2003 | Not on the Lips | Faradel | Alain Resnais | |
| 2003 | Volpone | Mosca | Frédéric Auburtin | TV movie |
| 2004 | La Méthode Bourchnikov | TV Host | Grégoire Sivan | Short |
| 2004 | Sodome & Virginie | Romeo | Laurent Preyale | TV movie |
| 2005 | Galilée ou L'amour de Dieu | The Witchfinder | Jean-Daniel Verhaeghe | TV movie |
| 2006 | La Maison du Bonheur | Jean-Pierre Draquart | Dany Boon | |
| 2006 | Je hais les parents | Henri | Didier Bivel | TV movie |
| 2007 | Curriculum | Guy Michel | Alexandre Moix | Short |
| 2007 | Le grand arrangement | René Bousquet | Laurent Heynemann | TV movie |
| 2007 | Monsieur Joseph | Youssef Hamoudi | Olivier Langlois | TV movie |
| 2008 | A Man and His Dog | Achab | Francis Huster | |
| 2008 | A Day at the Museum | Maurice Bagnole | Jean-Michel Ribes (4) | |
| 2008 | Home Sweet Home | Albert | Didier Le Pêcheur | |
| 2008 | Le bal des finissantes | | Sören Prévost (3) | Short |
| 2008 | Un souvenir | Thomas Lebey | Jacques Renard | TV movie |
| 2009 | Little Nicholas | M. Moucheboume | Laurent Tirard | |
| 2009 | Lucky Luke | Pat Poker | James Huth | |
| 2010 | Wandering Streams | Émile | Pascal Rabaté | |
| 2013 | Les invincibles | René Martinez | Frédéric Berthe | |
| 2013 | Les mauvaises têtes | Paul | Pierre Isoard | TV movie |
| 2014 | Nicholas on Holiday | M. Moucheboume | Laurent Tirard | |
| 2014 | Du goudron et des plumes | Kader | Pascal Rabaté (2) | |
| 2015 | Sardine | Jacques | Christel Delahaye | Short |
| 2016 | We Are Tourists | Claude | O'ar Pali & Remy Bazerque | |
| 2016 | The law of Simon | Lawyer Simon Varlet | Didier Le Pêcheur (2) | TV movie |
| 2023 | The Crime Is Mine | Le Président des Assises | François Ozon | |
| 2024 | Mademoiselle Holmes | Georges Holmes | | TV series |

== Theater ==
| Year | Title | Author | Director | Notes |
|---|---|---|---|---|
| 1961 | The Bungler | Molière | Jean Meyer | Théâtre du Palais-Royal |
| 1961 | Le Dépit amoureux | Molière | Jean Meyer (2) | Théâtre du Palais-Royal |
| 1961 | Un certain monsieur Blot | Robert Rocca | René Dupuy | Théâtre Gramont |
| 1962 | Les Femmes Savantes | Molière | Jean Meyer (3) | Théâtre du Palais-Royal |
| 1966 | Lysistrata | Aristophanes | Gérard Vergez | Théâtre Édouard VII |
| 1971–72 | La Main passe | Georges Feydeau | Pierre Mondy | Théâtre Marigny |
| 1972 | Duos sur canapé | Marc Camoletti | Marc Camoletti | Théâtre Michel |
| 1976 | Attends-moi pour commencer | Joyce Rayburn | Michel Roux | Théâtre Édouard VII |
| 1977 | Grandeur et Misère | Marcel Barju | Pierre Vielhescaze & Claude Kolton | Théâtre Fontaine |
| 1979 | Venez nombreux | Daniel Prévost | Daniel Prévost | Théâtre des 400 coups |
| 1980 | On dînera au lit | Marc Camoletti | Marc Camoletti (2) | Théâtre Michel |
| 1980 | Décibel | Julien Vartet | Max Fournel | Théâtre Marigny |
| 1982 | La Galipette | E. Barrett | Robert Manuel | Théâtre Marigny |
| 1984 | La Pomme | Louis Verneuil & Georges Berr | René Dupuy (2) | Théâtre Marigny |
| 1985–86 | La Prise de Berg-Op-Zoom | Sacha Guitry | Jean Meyer (4) | Théâtre des Nouveautés |
| 1987–88 | The Odd Couple | Neil Simon | Jean-Luc Moreau | Théâtre des Célestins |
| 1989 | Duos sur canapé | Marc Camoletti | Marc Camoletti (3) | Théâtre Michel |
| 1990 | Vite une femme | Daniel Prévost | Jean-Luc Moreau (2) | Théâtre Michel |
| 1991 | Déconnage immédiat | Daniel Prévost | Daniel Prévost (2) | Grand Théâtre d'Edgar |
| 1993 | La Frousse | Julien Vartet | Raymond Acquaviva | Théâtre Édouard VII |
| 1996 | The Miser | Molière | Christophe Correia | Théâtre de Boulogne-Billancourt |
| 2000 | Show Business | George Huang | Thomas Langmann | Théâtre de la Gaîté-Montparnasse |
| 2002 | Sodome et Virginie | Daniel Prévost | Daniel Prévost (3) | Théâtre de la Gaîté-Montparnasse |
| 2005 | Être ou ne pas être Daniel Prévost | Daniel Prévost | Sorën Prévost | Tour |
| 2008 | Fédérico, l'Espagne et moi | Daniel Prévost | Erling Prévost | Tour |
| 2014–15 | The Star-Spangled Girl | Neil Simon | Pierre Laville | Théâtre Saint-Georges |
