= Gérard Filippelli =

French actor and musician (1942–2021)

- Born: 14 December 1942; Paris, Vichy France
- Died: 30 March 2021 (aged 78); Argenteuil, France
- Occupations: Actor; Singer

Gérard Filippelli (14 December 1942 – 30 March 2021) was a French actor, composer and singer.

== Life and career ==
In 1964, Filippelli bought an amp from an American soldier in Châteauroux for 500 francs. In 1966, he performed at the Cinéma REX and befriended Jean Sarrus and Gérard Rinaldi. He became sound manager in their group. They formed the acting and singing group Les Charlots, where he stayed until 1997. In 1970, his wife died in an automobile accident.

Filippelli died on 30 March 2021, at the age of 78.

== Filmography ==
- La Grande Java (1970)
- Les Bidasses en folie (1971)
- Stadium Nuts (1972)
- Les Charlots font l'Espagne (1972)
- The Big Store (1973)
- I Don't Know Much, But I'll Say Everything (1973)
- The Four Charlots Musketeers (1974)
- The Four Charlots Musketeers 2 (1974)
- Les bidasses s'en vont en guerre (1974)
- Trop c'est trop (1975)
- Bons Baisers de Hong Kong (1975)
- Les Charlots en délire (1979)
- Les Charlots contre Dracula (1980)
- Le Retour des bidasses en folie (1983)
- Charlots Connection (1984)
- Le Retour des Charlots (1992)
- Les Charlots Intime (2013)
- Les Charlots... Au Phil du temps (2018)
