= Luis Rego =

Portuguese actor, comedian and musician

- Born: 30 March 1944 (age 82); Lisbon, Portugal
- Occupations: Actor, Comedian, Writer, Director
- Years active: 1969–present

Luis Rego (born 30 March 1944) is a Portuguese actor, comedian, writer and director based in France. He was a founding member of music/comedy group Les Charlots which he left after a few years.

== Theater ==
Year	Title	Author	Director	Notes
1973	Le dernier sorti nettoie la salle	Luis Rego	Luis Rego	One Man Show
1975	Viens chez moi, j'habite chez une copine	Luis Rego & Didier Kaminka	Jean-Luc Moreau	Théâtre des Champs-Élysées
1977	Fromage ou dessert	Philippe Bruneau	Luis Rego (2)	Café de la Gare
1979	Les chantiers de la gloire	Philippe Bruneau & Martin Lamotte	Luis Rego (3)	Théâtre de l'Atelier
1982	Hommage à Koudechapo	Luis Rego	Luis Rego (4)	One Man Show, Théâtre Fontaine
1985	Orpheus in the Underworld	Jacques Offenbach	René Dupuy	
1986	L'auvent du pavillon 4	Sotha	Sotha	Café de la Gare
1989	La Bonne Adresse	Marc Camoletti	Marc Camoletti	
1992-93	Une fille entre nous	Éric Assous	Éric Assous	
1995	Assemblywomen	Aristophanes	Jean-Luc Tardieu	
1997	Panier de crabes	Neil Simon	Jacques Rosny	
1998	Le Médecin malgré lui	Molière	Maurice Risch	
2000	Sarcelles sur mer	Jean-Pierre Bisson	Jean-Pierre Bisson	
2002-04	Un simple froncement de sourcil	Ged Marlon	Ged Marlon	Théâtre du Rond-Point
2009	La Celestina	Fernando de Rojas	Frédérique & Henri Lazarini	Théâtre du Rond-Point
2013	Keep an Eye on Amelia	Georges Feydeau	Pierre Laville	

== Filmography ==
Year	Title	Role	Director	Notes
1969	L'homme qui venait du Cher	Luis	Maurice Dumay	TV movie
1970	Le Distrait		Pierre Richard	
1970	Les saintes chéries	A musician	Jean Becker	TV series (1 episode)
1971	La grande java	Luis	Philippe Clair	
1971	Les Bidasses en folie	Luis	Claude Zidi	
1973	I Don't Know Much, But I'll Say Everything	Luis	Pierre Richard (2)	
1974	Le führer en folie	Harry	Philippe Clair (2)	
1974	La grande Paulette	Luis	Gérald Calderon	
1974	Bons baisers de Tarzan	Tarzan	Pierre Desfons	TV movie
1974	Bons baisers d'Astérix	The Sports	Pierre Desfons (2)	TV movie
1975	La Course à l'échalote	Franz	Claude Zidi (2)	
1977	Vous n'aurez pas l'Alsace et la Lorraine	The Second Captain	Coluche	
1978	French Fried Vacation	Bobo	Patrice Leconte	
1981	Men Prefer Fat Girls	Gérard Langlois	Jean-Marie Poiré	
1981	Le roi des cons	The Husband	Claude Confortès	
1982	Merci Bernard	Various	Jean-Michel Ribes	TV series (2 episodes)
1983	Circulez y a rien à voir !	Reska	Patrice Leconte (2)	
1983	Sandy	Ernest	Michel Nerval	
1983	Le retour des bidasses en folie	The Sergeant	Michel Vocoret	
1983	Debout les crabes, la mer monte !	The Lawyer	Jean-Jacques Grand-Jouan	
1983	Le lavabo		Patrick Bouchitey	TV mini-series
1984	The Vengeance of the Winged Serpent	Alvaro	Gérard Oury	
1984	La smala	The Internal	Jean-Loup Hubert	
1984	Aldo et Junior	Paul	Patrick Schulmann	
1985	Tranches de vie	The Interpreter	François Leterrier	
1986	The Wolf at the Door		Henning Carlsen	
1986	Paulette, la pauvre petite milliardaire	Georges	Claude Confortès (2)	
1986	Maine-Ocean Express	Inspector Lucien Pontoiseau	Jacques Rozier	
1986	Le croc-note show	The Man	Gilles Gay	TV series
1987	The Big Bang	Fred	Picha	
1987	Poule et frites	Roger / Antoine	Luis Rego	
1987	Marc et Sophie	Roméo	Agnès Delarive	TV series (1 episode)
1989	Personne ne m'aime		Bernard Dubois	TV movie
1990	La bonne adresse	Spartacus	Georges Folgoas	TV movie
1991	The Professional Secrets of Dr. Apfelgluck	Monsieur Gomez	Alessandro Capone, Thierry Lhermitte, ...	
1991	My Life Is Hell	Pazou	Josiane Balasko	
1991	Salut les copains	Memphis	Massimo Manganaro & Dominique Masson	TV series
1992	Le retour des Charlots	Antonio	Jean Sarrus	
1992	Les cravates léopards	Jo Ballister	Jean-Luc Trotignon	TV movie
1993	Coitado do Jorge	Sequeira	Jorge Silva Melo	
1993	Télé-carton	A Man	Gil Lefauconnier & Isabelle Salvini	Short
1994	One Night of Hypocrisy	A Man	Nicolas Hourès & David Rudrauf	Short
1996	Le coeur fantôme	Philippe	Philippe Garrel	
1996	Jamais 2 sans toi	Serge	Emmanuel Fonlladosa	TV series (1 episode)
1997	Les années lycée : Petites	Inès's Father	Noémie Lvovsky	TV movie
1998	Ça n'empêche pas les sentiments	Bernard	Jean-Pierre Jackson	
1998	Il suffirait d'un pont		Solveig Dommartin	Short
1998	Le bon coin	The Man	Jacques Richard	Short
1998	Ivre mort pour la patrie		Vincent Hachet	TV Short
1998	Le monde d'Angelo	Robert	Pascal Kané	TV movie
1999	La vie ne me fait pas peur	Inès's Father	Noémie Lvovsky (2)	
1999	Superlove	Maurice	Jean-Claude Janer	
2000	La Chambre obscure	The Confessor	Marie-Christine Questerbert	
2000	Um Dia na Vida	Luis	Álvaro Zuñiga	Short
2000	Le p'tit bleu	Inspector Villard	François Vautier	TV movie
2001	Day Off	Mercier	Pascal Thomas	
2001	Get a Life	Adérito	João Canijo	
2001	Fifi Martingale		Jacques Rozier (2)	
2001	Qui cherche trouve	The Priest	Jérôme Soubeyrand	Short
2001	Objectif bac	Adolpho Pereira	Patrick Volson	TV movie
2001	Rastignac ou les ambitieux	Monsieur Albert	Alain Tasma	TV mini-series
2002	Fleurs de sang	Festival Erotico's Director	Myriam Mézières & Alain Tanner	
2002	Mille millièmes	Monsieur Da Silva	Rémi Waterhouse	
2003	Raining Cats and Frogs	René Lamotte	Jacques-Rémy Girerd	
2004	San-Antonio	Pinaud	Frédéric Auburtin	
2004	A Casa Esquecida	The Farmer	Teresa Garcia	Short
2005	El cantor	William Stern	Joseph Morder	
2005	3 femmes... un soir d'été	Commissioner Solignac	Sébastien Grall	TV mini-series
2005	Maigret	Monsieur Peyrelongue	Charles Nemes	TV series (1 episode)
2006	Quatre étoiles	Robert	Christian Vincent	
2006	S.O.S. 18	Hector	Bruno Garcia	TV series (1 episode)
2007	After Him (Après lui)	Franck's Father	Gaël Morel	
2007	New délire	Machin	Eric Le Roch	
2008	Villa Marguerite	Étienne Grandclément	Denis Malleval	TV movie
2008	Elles et Moi	Jo Morales	Bernard Stora	TV mini-series
2010	Copacabana	Patrice	Marc Fitoussi	
2010	À vos caisses	Monsieur André	Pierre Isoard	TV movie
2011	Un film sans...		Ronan Sinquin	TV series (1 episode)
2012	Nuts	François's Father	Yann Coridian	
2012	La lapidation de Saint Étienne	Brother	Pere Vilà i Barceló	
2013	Attila Marcel	Monsieur Coelho	Sylvain Chomet	
2014	Plutôt crever que mourir ici...	The Man	Jean-Baptiste Delannoy	Short
