= Big store =

Big store may refer to:

- Big store, an elaborate confidence trick: see List of confidence tricks
- The Big Store, 1941 Marx Bros film
- The Big Store (1973 film), a 1973 French comedy film
- A large retail establishment, see Big-box store
