= La Zizanie (film) =

1978 film by Claude Zidi

- Directed by: Claude Zidi
- Written by: Claude Zidi; Michel Fabre
- Produced by: Christian Fechner
- Starring: Louis de Funès; Annie Girardot
- Cinematography: Claude Renoir
- Edited by: Monique Isnardon; Robert Isnardon
- Music by: Vladimir Cosma
- Distributed by: AMLF
- Release date: 16 March 1978
- Running time: 90 minutes
- Country: France
- Language: French

La Zizanie is a 1978 French comedy film directed by Claude Zidi, written by Zidi and Michel Fabre, and starring Louis de Funès and Annie Girardot. The English title is The Spat.

== Plot ==
Guillaume Daubray-Lacaze (Louis de Funès), an industrialist in depolluting materials and systems, has signed a contract with a Japanese enterprise to order 3000 pieces of his CX-22 machines, saving his business from bankruptcy. However, his workers quickly make him realise that he doesn't have enough space to store and create the new CX-22. Realising his mistake, Daubray-Lacaze starts invading the house with all sorts of machines, and even placing workers in his bedroom. His wife, Bernadette (Annie Girardot) tries to ignore these inconveniences, but breaks after her husband destroys her whole garden to store his machines. Furious, she leaves Guillaume, and presents herself to the municipal elections against her own husband.

== Cast ==
- Louis de Funès as Guillaume Daubray-Lacaze
- Annie Girardot as Bernadette Daubray-Lacaze
- Maurice Risch as the imbecile
- Jean-Jacques Moreau as the foreman
- Geneviève Fontanel as Madame Berger
- Jacques François as the prefect
- Georges Staquet as the union representative
- Mario David as the lorry driver
