= Julien Guiomar =

French actor

- Julien Guiomar in Z in 1969
- Born: 3 May 1928; Morlaix, Finistère, France
- Died: 22 November 2010 (aged 82); Agen, Lot-et-Garonne, France

Julien Guiomar (3 May 1928 in Morlaix, – 22 November 2010 in Agen), was a French actor.

== Biography ==
The son of a dentist, Guiomar grew up in Finistère, Brittany. He settled in Paris to become an actor, taking classes at the Cours Simon.

Guiomar debuted in theatre, and was a performer at the Théâtre National Populaire under Jean Vilar's direction.

He debuted on screen in the mid-1960s, gradually becoming a familiar figure in French films. One of his first significant roles was that of the criminal clergyman in Louis Malle's The Thief of Paris (1967). His film career was jump-started by his performance as a putschist colonel in Costa-Gavras's Z (1969).

Guiomar subsequently played major supporting roles in many French box office successes of the 1970s and 1980s, and specialized in portraying authority figures and obnoxious characters. While he also appeared in dramas, he found particular success in comedies, where he was often cast as grotesque antagonists, or as arrogant individuals who eventually get their comeuppances. His roles include the abusive revolutionary official in The Married Couple of the Year Two alongside Jean-Paul Belmondo (1971), the villainous junk food mogul in The Wing or the Thigh opposite Louis de Funès and Coluche (1976), and the unraveling police commissioner in My New Partner (1984). The film directors he regularly worked with include Philippe de Broca and Claude Zidi.

Guiomar retired in the mid-2000s, settling in Monpazier, Dordogne. He died of complications from a heart disease.

== Filmography ==
- Le Roi de cœur (King of Hearts) (directed by Philippe de Broca) (1966) as Monsignor Marguerite
- Le Voleur (The Thief of Paris) (directed by Louis Malle) (1967) as Abbot Félix La Margelle
- All Mad About Him (directed by Norbert Carbonnaux) (1967) as Antoine Bascou
- La Louve solitaire (directed by Édouard Logereau) (1968) as Durieux
- Pour un amour lointain (directed by Edmond Séchan) (1968) as Maxime
- Ballade pour un chien (directed by Gérard Vergez) (1969) as Robin
- Z (directed by Costa-Gavras) (1969) as Gendarmerie Colonel
- La Voie lactée (The Milky Way) (directed by Luis Buñuel) (1969) as Spanish priest
- The Auvergnat and the Bus (directed by Guy Lefranc) (1969) as Valentin Chanterive
- La Fiancée du pirate (directed by Nelly Kaplan) (1969) as Duke
- La Horse (directed by Pierre Granier-Deferre) (1970) as Commissioner
- Borsalino (directed by Jacques Deray) (1970) as Simon Boccace
- L'Étrangleur (directed by Paul Vecchiali) (1970) as Simon Dangret
- Les Mariés de l'an II (directed by Jean-Paul Rappeneau) as People's Representative
- Doucement les basses (directed by Jacques Deray) (1971) as Francisco
- La violenza: quinto potere (directed by Florestano Vancini) (1972) as Commissioner Golino
- State of Siege (directed by Costa-Gavras) (1972) Carlos Ducas (voice, uncredited)
- La Raison du plus fou (directed by Raymond Devos and François Reichenbach) (1973) as restaurant owner
- Décembre (directed by Mohammed Lakhdar-Hamina) (1973) as General Beaumont
- La Proprietà non è più un furto (directed by Elio Petri) (1973) as Bank Director
- L'Histoire très bonne et très joyeuse de Colinot trousse-chemise (The Edifying and Joyous Story of Colinot) (directed by Nina Companeez) (1973) as Rosemondee's husband
- Une baleine qui avait mal aux dents (directed by Jacques Bral) (1974) as Julien
- Tendre Dracula (directed by Pierre Grunstein) (1974) as producer
- Dites-le avec des fleurs (directed by Pierre Grimblat) (1974) as Dr. Comolli
- La Moutarde me monte au nez (directed by Claude Zidi) (1974) as Albert Renaudin
- Bons baisers... à lundi (directed by Michel Audiard) (1974) as Maurice Poudevigne
- Aloïse (directed by Liliane de Kermadec) (1975) as theater director
- Section spéciale (Special Section) (directed by Costa-Gavras) (1975) as Substitute Prosecutor Tétaud
- Souvenirs d'en France (directed by André Téchiné) (1975) as Victor Pedret
- L'Incorrigible (directed by Philippe de Broca) (1975) as Camille
- Adieu poulet (The French Detective) (directed by Pierre Granier-Deferre) (1975) as general supervisor Ledoux
- À cause de l'homme à la voiture blanche (directed by Jean Rougeul) (1975)
- Mado (directed by Claude Sautet) (1976) as Lépidon
- L'Aile ou la cuisse (directed by Claude Zidi) (1976) as Jacques Tricatel
- Barocco (directed by André Téchiné) (1976) as Gauthier
- L'Animal (directed by Claude Zidi) (1977) as Fechner
- Mort d'un pourri (directed by Georges Lautner) (1977) as Fondari
- La Zizanie (directed by Claude Zidi) (1978) as Dr. Landry
- Ils sont fous ces sorciers (directed by Georges Lautner) (1978) as Stumph-Bachelier
- Les Ringards (directed by Robert Pouret) (1978) as Jeannot Bidart
- Je vous ferai aimer la vie (directed by Serge Korber) (1979) as Dr. Pierre Soltier
- Caro papà (directed by Dino Risi) (1979) as Parrella
- Milo Milo (directed by Nicos Perakis) (1979) as Louis
- Sono fotogenico (directed by Dino Risi) (1980) as Carlo Simoni
- Le Bar du téléphone (directed by Claude Barrois) (1980) as Antoine Bini
- Inspecteur la Bavure (directed by Claude Zidi) as Commissioner Vermillot
- Est-ce bien raisonnable ? (directed by Georges Lautner) (1981) as Raymond Volfoni
- Un chien dans un jeu de quilles (directed by Bernard Guillou) (1983) as Alexandre
- Équateur (directed by Serge Gainsbourg) (1983) as Bouilloux
- Papy fait de la résistance (directed by Jean-Marie Poiré) (1983) as Colonel Vincent
- Carmen (directed by Francesco Rosi) (1984) as Lillas Pastia
- Les Ripoux (My New Partner) (directed by Claude Zidi) (1984) as Commissioner Bloret
- L'Arbre sous la mer (directed by Philippe Muyl) (1985) as Thomas
- The Alley Cat (Le Matou) (directed by Jean Beaudin) (1985) as Aurélien Picquot
- Le Débutant (directed by Daniel Janneau) (1986) as Lucien Berger
- Jubiabá (directed by Nelson Pereira dos Santos) (1986) as Luigi
- Dernier été à Tanger (directed by Alexandre Arcady) (1987) as Commissioner Gomez
- Flag (directed by Jacques Santi) (1987) as Léon Terzakian
- Les Deux crocodiles (directed by Joël Séria) (1987) as Julien Derouineau
- Terre sacrée (directed by Emilio Pacull) (1988) as Father
- African Timber (directed by Peter F. Bringmann) (1989) as Girolles
- Astérix et le coup du menhir (directed by Philippe Grimond) (1989) as the soothsayer (voice)
- Lucifer et l'horloger (directed by Luc Lefebvre) (1989, Short)
- Plein fer (directed by Josée Dayan) (1990) asFabiani
- Robinson et compagnie (directed by Jacques Colombat) (1991) as Bougainville (voice)
- Léolo (directed by Jean-Claude Lauzon) (1992) as Grandfather
- Je m'appelle Victor (directed by Guy Jacques) (1993) as Emile
- Violetta la reine de la moto (directed by Guy Jacques) (1997) as Corneille
- Que la lumière soit (directed by Arthur Joffé) (1998) as God
- Un peu de retenue ! (directed by Sylvain Gillet) (1999, Short)
- J'ai faim !!! (directed by Florence Quentin) (2001) as Guyomard
- Reptil (directed by Pascal Stervinou) (2003, Short) as Emile Picard
- Clandestino (directed by Paule Muxel) (2003) as Jean
