= I Don't Know Much, But I'll Say Everything =

- Directed by: Pierre Richard
- Screenplay by: Pierre Richard; Didier Kaminka
- Produced by: Christian Fechner
- Starring: Pierre Richard; Bernard Blier
- Cinematography: Pierre Lhomme
- Edited by: Yann Dedet
- Music by: Michel Fugain
- Distributed by: AMLF
- Release date: 6 December 1973
- Running time: 90 minutes
- Country: France
- Language: French
- Box office: $11.1 million

I Don't Know Much, But I'll Say Everything (French: Je sais rien, mais je dirai tout) is a 1973 French comedy film directed by Pierre Richard.

== Plot ==
Pierre Gastié-Leroy (Pierre Richard) is the son of a wealthy director of a factory of weapon manufacturing (Bernard Blier). Despite his parents, two generous uncles and a bishop godfather who try to inculcate in him the rigid values of his social level, Pierre is a dreamer, antimilitaristic, social educator who dreams of saving three thugs, his "little guys," at the limit of delinquency. After several resounding failures that sent him to prison, Pierre is ordered by his father to join his factory to direct the social service. Tired of the venality of his father and the foolishness of the "little guys", Pierre hires them at the factory. They will have fun making mischief and being overzealous to convince the supervisors on increasing the working rhythms, denouncing the trade union leaders, battling a strike and finally, stealing 500 tanks to sell them to the black market. A demonstration of new remote-controlled missiles attended by the Minister for Defence turns into a fiasco. Injured in his pride, the father Gastié-Leroy wants to show the reliability of his product by pointing the fire at his own factory.

== Cast ==
- Pierre Richard as Pierre Gastié-Leroy
- Bernard Blier as Monsieur Gastié-Leroy
- Didier Kaminka as Didier
- Luis Rego as Luis
- Georges Beller as Georges
- Pierre Tornade as the police commissioner
- Daniel Prévost as Morel
- Danièle Minazzoli as Danou, the nurse
- Nicole Jamet as Nicole
- Hélène Duc as Madame Gastié-Leroy
- Francis Lax as Antoine
- Pierre Repp as Vernier, the factory director
- Jean Obé as Oncle Léon, godfather of Philippe
- André Thorent as Oncle Jean
- Michel Delahaye as Oncle Paul
- Xavier Depraz as Général Deglane
- Jean Saudray as Morin
- François Cadet as Félix
- Victor Lanoux as a laborer
- Teddy Vrignault as Staflikevitch, the Bulgarian
- André Gaillard as the Social Security employee
- France Rumilly as Laurence Deglane
- Les Charlots (Gérard Rinaldi, Jean Sarrus, Gérard Filippelli, Jean-Guy Fechner) as Soldiers
