= Véronique Genest =

French actress (born 1956)

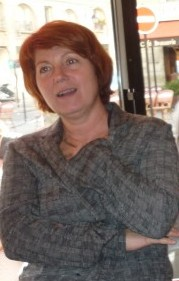
- Véronique Genest 2009
- Born: Véronique Combouilhaud; 26 June 1956 (age 69); Meaux, Seine-et-Marne, France
- Occupation: Actor
- Years active: 1980–present
- Known for: Julie Lescaut

Véronique Genest (born Véronique Combouilhaud, 26 June 1956) is a French actress. She is best known for her starring role as Commissaire Julie Lescaut in the French police drama series Julie Lescaut which ran from 1992–2013.

== Filmography ==
=== Film ===
- 1980 : La Banquière (English Title: The Lady Banker)
- 1982 : Guy de Maupassant : Fanny
- 1982 : Légitime violence : Lucie Kasler
- 1983 : Il quartetto Basileus (Italian/French Collaboration) : Sophia
- 1983 : J'ai épousé une ombre : Patricia Meyrand
- 1983 : Debout les crabes, la mer monte ! : Marthe
- 1984 : Tango
- 1985 : La Baston : Denise Levasseur
- 1985 : Ça n'arrive qu'à moi : Prudence
- 1986 : Suivez mon regard (English Title: Follow My Gaze) : Une fille délurée
- 1986 : Triple sec (Short)
- 1986 : Chère canaille : Frédérique Henriot
- 1987 : Association de malfaiteurs (English Title: Association of Wrongdoers) : Monique Lemercier
- 1987 : Strike (Short)
- 1989 : Un père et passe : Marianne
- 1990 : Le grand ruban : Sylvie
- 1991 : On peut toujours rêver (English Title: One Can Always Dream) : La prostituée mélomane
- 1991 : Les secrets professionnels du Dr Apfelglück (English Title: The Professional Secrets of Dr. Apfelgluck) : Micheline
- 1992 : Et demain ... Hollywood ! : Marie Bluchet
- 1997 : Droit dans le mur (English Title: Straight into the Wall) : Myriam

=== Television ===
- 1981 : Nana (TV Mini-Series) – (four episodes) : Nana
- 1983 : Le ambizioni sbagliate (Italian TV Movie) : Andreina
- 1983 : Péchés originaux (TV Mini-Series) – (Season 1 Episode 5, Adam et Ève) : Lydie
- 1984 : Emportez-la avec vous (TV Movie) : Myriam
- 1986–1991 : Série noire (TV Series) – (Season 1, Episode 20,37) : Marlène/Lucien
- 1988 : Sueurs froides (TV Series) – (Season 1, Episode 1, Le chat et la souris) : Valérie Vétheuil
- 1989 : Une femme tranquille (TV Movie) : Véronique
- 1989 : L'été de tous les chagrins (TV Movie) : Ginette
- 1989 : Les sirènes de minuit (TV Movie) : Maud
- 1989 : David Lansky (TV Series) (Season 1 Episode 3, Le gang des limousines) : Yasmine Sublet
- 1989 : Une table pour six (TV Movie) : Corinne
- 1990 : V comme vengeance (TV Series) – (Episode 14, Une table pour six) : Corinne
- 1990 : Mit den Clowns kamen die Tränen (German TV Mini-Series) : Francine Renaud
- 1992 : Ma tu mi vuoi bene? (Italian TV Movie) : Livia
- 1992 : Secret de famille (TV Mini-Series) : Marthe
- 1992–2013 : Julie Lescaut (TV Series) – (Seasons 1-23) : Commissaire Julie Lescaut
- 1996 : Sixième classique (TV Movie) : Simone
- 1998 : Un amour de cousine (TV Movie) : Lucille
- 2000 : On n'est pas là pour s'aimer (TV Movie) : Frédérique Letheil
- 2003 : Une femme si parfaite (TV Movie) : Anne Joubert
- 2006 : Un transat pour huit (TV Movie) : Florence
- 2007 : La dame d'Izieu (TV Mini-Series) : Sabine Zlatin
- 2011 : Merci patron! (English Title: Who's the Boss Now?) (TV Movie) : Hélène Scoffie
- 2014 : La disparue du Pyla (TV Movie) : Carole Castel

== Awards ==
- 2004 : Decorated with the Légion d'honneur by French president Jacques Chirac.
