= That Hagen Girl =

1947 film by Peter Godfrey

- Theatrical poster
- Directed by: Peter Godfrey
- Screenplay by: Charles Hoffman
- Based on: That Hagen Girl (1946 novel) by Edith Kneipple Roberts
- Produced by: Alex Gottlieb
- Starring: Ronald Reagan; Shirley Temple; Rory Calhoun; Lois Maxwell
- Cinematography: Karl Freund
- Edited by: David Weisbart
- Music by: Franz Waxman
- Production company: Warner Bros. Pictures
- Distributed by: Warner Bros. Pictures
- Release date: November 1, 1947
- Running time: 83 minutes
- Country: United States
- Language: English
- Budget: $1,327,000
- Box office: $1.5 million (US) or $2,119,000

That Hagen Girl is a 1947 American drama film directed by Peter Godfrey. The screenplay by Charles Hoffman was based on the novel by Edith Kneipple Roberts. The film focuses on small-town teenaged girl Mary Hagen (Shirley Temple), whom gossips believe is the illegitimate daughter of former resident and lawyer Tom Bates (Ronald Reagan). Lois Maxwell received a Golden Globe award for her performance.

== Plot ==
Mary Hagen is believed by town gossips to be the illegitimate daughter of Tom Bates, a former resident and lawyer. She is often treated badly. Bates moves back into town and begins a friendship with Hagen's favorite teacher Julia Kane (Maxwell). Hints are dropped that Bates is the real father of Hagen, though she is later revealed to be an orphan adopted by the Hagens. When the teacher leaves town, she suggests to Bates that he stop playing Hagen's father, as it has become clear that he is in love with her and that Mary unknowingly feels the same. Ultimately, Bates and Hagen board a train out of town after getting married.

== Cast ==
- Shirley Temple as Mary Hagen
- Ronald Reagan as Tom Bates
- Rory Calhoun as Ken Freneau
- Conrad Janis as Dewey Koons
- Lois Maxwell as Julia Kane
- Dorothy Peterson as Minta Hagen
- Charles Kemper as Jim Hagen
- Penny Edwards as Christine Delaney
- Jean Porter as Sharon Bailey
- Harry Davenport as Judge A. Merrivale
- Nella Walker as Molly Freneau
- Winifred Harris as Selma Delaney
- Moroni Olsen as Trenton Gateley
- Frank Conroy as Dr. Stone
- Kathryn Card as Miss Grover
- Jack Mower as Gossip (uncredited)

== Production ==
Reagan considered it his least-liked role. In her autobiography, Temple confirms that Reagan apparently detested his role and that it was a very difficult period in his life. After multiple retakes of a scene in which Reagan's character rescues Temple's character from a suicide attempt by jumping into a river during a storm, Reagan collapsed. He was hospitalized in Cedars of Lebanon Hospital with viral pneumonia.

Almost all prints of the film mysteriously disappeared from various film storage facilities and television stations as Ronald Reagan was becoming a prominent political figure. The film resurfaced in the 1990s with showings on Turner Classic Movies.

== Critical reception ==
In one scene, Temple attempts suicide. A critic wrote that it was too bad the attempt failed.

The New York Times thought the script amateurish and of Reagan and Temple wrote, "Ronald Reagan keeps as straight a face as he can while doing what must have struck him as the silliest job of his career ... but it is poor, little put-upon Shirley who looks most ridiculous through it all. She acts with the mopish dejection of a school-child who has just been robbed of a two-scoop ice cream cone."

The film was included in the popular 1978 book The Fifty Worst Films of All Time.

== Box office ==
According to Warner Bros. records, the film earned $1,818,000 domestically and $301,000 foreign.

== Awards ==
Lois Maxwell earned a Golden Globe Award (Most Promising Newcomer: Female) for her performance in the film.
