= Bons Baisers de Hong Kong =

1975 film

- Original film art by Yves Thos
- Directed by: Yvan Chiffre
- Written by: Christian Fechner; Yvan Chiffre
- Produced by: Christian Fechner
- Starring: Les Charlots
- Cinematography: Walter Wottitz
- Edited by: Monique Isnardon; Robert Isnardon
- Music by: Les Charlots
- Production companies: Les Films Christian Fechner; Renn Productions
- Distributed by: AMLF
- Release date: 17 December 1975
- Running time: 97 min
- Country: France
- Language: French

Bons Baisers de Hong Kong (also known as From Hong Kong with Love) is a 1975 French spy comedy film directed by Yvan Chiffre.

It is a parody and spin-off of the James Bond film series starring Les Charlots, with Mickey Rooney portraying the antagonist. Bernard Lee and Lois Maxwell make cameos in their roles as M and Miss Moneypenny (though the characters remain unnamed). Part of the picture was filmed at the Shaw Brothers studios in Hong Kong. Besides the James Bond series, the film also parodies Hong Kong martial arts films.

== Plot ==
James Bond is shot and killed in a parody of the James Bond gun barrel sequence. Queen Elizabeth II is then kidnapped by a wealthy American megalomaniac. Since their best agent is dead, the British secret services ask for help from their French counterparts, the SDECE. The Les Charlots group are tasked with hiding the queen's disappearance while the investigation continues to Spain, then to Hong Kong. In the meantime, a parisian concierge, who is a dead ringer for Elizabeth II, impersonates the Queen in public.

== Cast ==
- Gérard Rinaldi as Gérard
- Gérard Filippelli as Phil
- Jean Sarrus as Jean
- Jean-Guy Fechner as Jean-Guy
- Mickey Rooney as Marty
- Víctor Israel as Victor
- David Tomlinson as Sir John MacGregor
- Huguette Funfrock as Madame Loubet / Queen Elizabeth II
- Lingfeng Shangguan as Tigress Li
- Yuen Siu Tien as Old Fu
- Jeane Manson as The Star
- Clifton James as Bill
- Thick Wilson as Fatty
- Leroy Haynes as Fat Black Man
- Louis Seigner as Vannier
- Léon Zitrone as French Spy
- Bernard Lee as M
- Lois Maxwell as Miss Moneypenny
- Alan Adair as English Lord
- André Badin as The Driver
- Philippe Castelli
- Jean-Louis Buhrer
- André Pousse as René
- Jacques Marin as Policemen
- Bernard Ranvier as Alistair
- Arch Taylor as American General
- Richard M. Dixon as President Richard M. Nixon
- Jodie Pretty as Doll Robot
