= Viens chez moi, j'habite chez une copine =

- Directed by: Patrice Leconte
- Written by: Patrice Leconte; Michel Blanc based on the play by Luis Rego, Didier Kaminka, Jean-Luc Voulfow and Jean-Paul Sèvres
- Produced by: Christian Fechner; Philippe Lievre; Bernard Marescot
- Starring: Michel Blanc; Bernard Giraudeau; Thérèse Liotard; Anémone
- Cinematography: Bernard Zitzermann
- Edited by: Jacqueline Thiédot
- Music by: Renaud; Ramon Pipin; Jean-Philippe Goude
- Production company: Les Films Christian Fechner
- Distributed by: AMLF
- Release date: 18 January 1981
- Running time: 85 minutes
- Country: France
- Language: French
- Box office: $7.6 million

Viens chez moi, j'habite chez une copine (lit. 'Come up to my place, I'm living at a girlfriend's') is a 1981 French comedy film directed by Patrice Leconte, starring Michel Blanc (who also wrote the screenplay with Leconte), Bernard Giraudeau and Thérèse Liotard. The film is loosely adapted from a play of the same name, which was also the basis for the 1977 American musical I Love My Wife.

The film was a box-office success in France. It was one of many films starring members of the troupe of Le Splendid, who had become France's new comedy stars in the early 1980s.

== Plot ==
Guy, an unscrupulous gas station attendant, scams clients by charging them for gasoline without putting it in their car. When his swindle is discovered, he is fired from his job. Now homeless (as he was housed by his employer), Guy asks to sleep and stay in the apartment of a friend, Daniel, who is living with his girlfriend, Françoise. Daniel, who works at a moving company, helps out Guy by getting him hired although he is obviously not cut out for the job.

The more Guy stays, the more he creates disaster in Françoise and Daniel's apartment. He causes particular embarrassment by inviting Adrienne, an oddball circus performer who believes they are all going to engage in group sex. Guy also returns to his dishonest ways by stealing expensive Château Margaux bottles from a client.

Daniel develops a crush on Cécile, an ANPE employee whom Guy had met while looking for a job. Guy helps Daniel cheat on Françoise with Cécile by inventing a business trip as a pretext.

Guy crashes Daniel's work truck. This, and his stealing, cause both he and Daniel to get fired from their jobs. Françoise sees through Guy's lies and evicts both Daniel and Guy from the apartment. Now both unemployed and homeless, Guy and Daniel resort to renting an abandoned factory that Guy wants to transform into a new home.

Françoise eventually forgives Daniel and welcomes him back. Some time later, Daniel and Françoise visit Guy, who is still renting the factory and is now illegally subletting it to a clothing workshop. Guy presents them with his new brilliant idea: buying and restoring an old mansion in Quercy so Daniel and Françoise can come and live with him there.

== Cast ==
- Michel Blanc as Guy
- Bernard Giraudeau as Daniel
- Thérèse Liotard as Françoise
- Christine Dejoux as Cécile
- Anémone as Adrienne
- Marie-Anne Chazel as Catherine
- Sylvie Granotier as attractive car owner
- Béatrice Costantini as wine bottles owner
- Jean Champion as Daniel's boss
- Guy Laporte as Daniel's colleague
- Marie-Pierre Casey as janitor
- Bruno Moynot as car owner

== Production ==
The original play, which premiered in 1975, was later performed at the Parisian comedy theater Le Splendid. Producer Christian Fechner, having bought the adaptation rights for the play, asked Michel Blanc and Patrice Leconte, who were both associated with Le Splendid (Blanc by being a member of the troupe, Leconte by directing the first film that starred them), to write a script. However, Leconte and Blanc were not impressed with the play, finding its treatment of swinging couples unfunny. With Fechner's permission, they rewrote the story entirely, keeping only the title; the swinging argument was scaled down and reduced to the scenes involving the character played by Anémone. The authors of the original play were not involved in the adaptation.

The script used as a context the rising unemployment and housing crisis that France was experiencing at the time.

== Reception ==
The film was very successful in France upon release, selling over 2.8 million admissions.

Le Monde mentioned Viens chez moi, j'habite chez une copine as a film that symbolized the emergence of a new generation of French comedians, who had debuted in café-théâtres and spoke the language of their time by using a humor based on a satirical observation of real life.

== Soundtrack ==
Renaud, then one of France's most popular pop-rock singers, composed and performed two songs for the film's soundtrack. The titular song was released as a successful single.

== Home media ==
The film was released on DVD and Blu-ray, and also on VOD on several services including UniversCiné, Pathé, Orange and Canal+.
