= Chouchou (film) =

2003 film

- Theatrical release poster
- Directed by: Merzak Allouache
- Written by: Merzak Allouache; Gad Elmaleh
- Produced by: Christian Fechner; Hervé Truffaut
- Starring: Gad Elmaleh; Alain Chabat; Claude Brasseur; Roschdy Zem; Catherine Frot
- Cinematography: Laurent Machuel
- Edited by: Sylvie Gadmer
- Music by: Gilles Tinayre; Germinal Tenas
- Production companies: Les Films Christian Fechner; France 2 Cinéma
- Distributed by: Warner Bros. Pictures
- Release date: 19 March 2003
- Running time: 105 minutes
- Country: France
- Language: French
- Budget: $8.3 million
- Box office: $22.3 million

Chouchou is a 2003 French comedy film directed by Merzak Allouache and produced by Christian Fechner. The film follows a cross-dressing Maghrebi man who settles in Paris to find his nephew. The film stars Gad Elmaleh as the title character Chouchou, for which he was nominated the César Award for Best Actor.

== Cast ==
- Gad Elmaleh as Chouchou
- Alain Chabat as Stanislas
- Claude Brasseur as Father Léon
- Roschdy Zem as Brother Jean
- Catherine Frot as Nicole Milovavovich
- Julien Courbey as Yekea
- Catherine Hosmalin as Madame Armand
- Micheline Presle as Stanislas's Mother
- Jacques Sereys as Stanislas's Father
- Arié Elmaleh as Vanessa
- Yacine Mesbah as Djamila
- Jean-Paul Comart as Inspector Molino
- Anne Marivin as The seller
