= Association of Wrongdoers =

1987 film

- Directed by: Claude Zidi
- Written by: Didier Kaminka; Simon Michaël; Claude Zidi
- Produced by: Claude Zidi
- Starring: François Cluzet; Christophe Malavoy; Claire Nebout
- Cinematography: Jean-Jacques Tarbès
- Edited by: Nicole Saunier
- Music by: Francis Lai
- Production companies: FR3 Cinema; Movies 7
- Distributed by: AMLF
- Release date: February 11, 1987 (France)
- Running time: 104 minutes
- Country: France
- Language: French

Association of Wrongdoers (French: Association de Malfaiteurs) is a 1987 French comedy film directed by Claude Zidi.

== Plot ==
Thierry, Gérard, Francis and Daniel, friends and former HEC Paris classmates, go to an evening organized by the School. Gérard and Thierry are business partners who are accused of stealing a safe from a wealthy tycoon in this situation comedy. A practical joke backfires when the two make their colleague Daniel believe he has won the lottery. The owner of the safe calls the police, who chase after the scheming duo. The two steal the safe a second time to cover the loss of the money taken in the first burglary. Monique is the sultry police commissioner and former flame of the robbery victim who investigates the bizarre case.

== Cast ==
- François Cluzet as Thierry
- Christophe Malavoy as Gérard
- Véronique Genest as Monique Lemercier
- Jean-Claude Leguay as Daniel
- Jean-Pierre Bisson as Bernard Hassler
- Claire Nebout as Claire
- Gérard Lecaillon as Francis

== Production ==
The film was shot between September 18 and October 31, 1986.
