= Slices of Life (1985 film) =

1985 French sci-fi–comedy film

- Directed by: François Leterrier
- Written by: Gérard Lauzier
- Starring: Laura Antonelli; Michel Boujenah; Josiane Balasko; Jean-Pierre Cassel; Christian Clavier; Marie-Anne Chazel; Roland Giraud; Gérard Jugnot; Pierre Richard; Martin Lamotte; Anémone
- Cinematography: Eduardo Serra
- Edited by: Claudine Bouché
- Music by: Jean-Claude Petit
- Release date: 6 February 1985
- Running time: 91 min
- Country: France
- Language: French
- Box office: $4.9 million

Slices of Life (Tranches de vie) is a 1985 French comedy-sci fi film directed by François Leterrier and written by Gérard Lauzier. It is based on Lauzier's comic strip of the same name.

== Plot ==
The film is a series of sketches.

== Cast ==
- Laura Antonelli as Monica Belli
- Michel Boujenah as Michel Lambert
- Josiane Balasko as Madame Dupuis
- Jean-Pierre Cassel as The Earl of Forcheville
- Christian Clavier as Charles-Henri
- Marie-Anne Chazel as Béatrice
- Ginette Garcin as Béatrice's mother
- Roland Giraud as Jean
- Pierre Mondy as The President
- Gérard Jugnot as Malounian
- Jean-Pierre Darroussin as The journalist
- Annie Grégorio as The journalist
- Daniel Prévost as TV Host
- Pierre Richard as Dubois
- Barbara Nielsen as Marianna
- Martin Lamotte as Alain
- Jacques Dynam as Alex
- Anémone as Cécile
- Jean Rougerie as Cécile's father
- Michel Galabru as The farmer
- Laurence Badie as The farmer
- Audrey Dana as The woman in the bed
- Hubert Deschamps as The prisoner
- Luis Rego as The interpreter
- Jacques Mathou
- Diego Abatantuono

== See also ==
- List of French films of 1985
