= Stadium Nuts =

Les Fous du Stade
- Directed by: Claude Zidi
- Written by: Claude Zidi; Jacques Fansten
- Produced by: Christian Fechner
- Starring: Gérard Rinaldi; Jean Sarrus; Gérard Filippelli; Jean-Guy Fechner; Paul Préboist; Martine Kelly
- Cinematography: Paul Bonis
- Edited by: Monique Isnardon
- Music by: Gérard Rinaldi; Jean Sarrus; Gérard Filipelli; Jean-Guy Fechner
- Distributed by: Compagnie Commerciale Française Cinématographique (CCFC)
- Release date: 22 September 1972
- Running time: 80 minutes
- Country: France
- Language: French

Les Fous du Stade (English: Crazy boys of the game / Stadium Nuts) is a 1972 French comedy film directed by Claude Zidi, starring the comedy team Les Charlots.

== Plot ==
The foursome (Gérard Rinaldi, Jean Sarrus, Gérard Filippelli, Jean-Guy Fechner) are on a holiday. The Little Olympic flame is to be passed through their village. A grocer (Paul Préboist) calls upon them for help in decorating the village. On their job Gérard falls for the grocer's daughter Délice (Martine Kelly). However she runs away with the sportsman with the flame. The four then enter the Little Olympics to try to win her back and cause havoc in the process.

== Cast ==
- Gérard Rinaldi - Gérard
- Jean Sarrus - Jean
- Gérard Filippelli - Phil
- Jean-Guy Fechner - Jean-Guy
- Paul Préboist - Jules Lafougasse
- Martine Kelly - Délice
- Gérard Croce - Lucien
- Jacques Seiler - The director of the Cyclists
- Antoine
- Guy Lux : Himself
- Christian Fechner : (Uncredited)
