= My New Partner II =

- Theatrical release poster
- Directed by: Claude Zidi
- Written by: Claude Zidi; Simon Michael; Didier Kaminka
- Produced by: Claude Zidi
- Starring: Philippe Noiret; Thierry Lhermitte
- Cinematography: Jean-Jacques Tarbes
- Edited by: Nicole Saulnier
- Music by: Francis Lai
- Distributed by: AMLF
- Release date: 7 February 1990
- Running time: 107 minutes
- Country: France
- Language: French

My New Partner II (French: Ripoux contre ripoux) is a 1990 French comedy film directed by Claude Zidi, starring Philippe Noiret and Thierry Lhermitte. It is a sequel to My New Partner.

== Cast ==
- Philippe Noiret - René Boirond
- Thierry Lhermitte - François Lesbuche
- Guy Marchand - Guy Brisson
- Jean-Pierre Castaldi - Jean-Pierre Portal
- Grace de Capitani - Natacha
- Line Renaud - Simone
- Michel Aumont - Bloret
- Jean-Claude Brialy - The banker
- Jean Benguigui - Cesarini
- Roger Jendly - Albert Le Fourgue
- Alain Mottet - The prefect

== Production ==
The film was partially shot in the Orne department, including at the Hippodrome Jean-Gabin in Moulins-la-Marche. Filming also took place in Paris, including in the 18th arrondissement.

== Reception ==
The film opened at number one at the box office in Paris, grossing 7.6 million French franc ($1.33 million) in its opening week from 47 theatres.
