= Les Bidasses en folie =

- Directed by: Claude Zidi
- Written by: Claude Zidi
- Produced by: Michel Ardan
- Starring: Gérard Rinaldi; Jean-Guy Fechner; Jean Sarrus; Gérard Filippelli; Luis Rego
- Cinematography: Paul Bonis
- Edited by: Françoise Berger-Garnault
- Music by: Les Charlots
- Distributed by: Compagnie Commerciale Française Cinématographique (CCFC)
- Release date: 15 December 1971
- Running time: 80 minutes
- Country: France
- Language: French

Les Bidasses en folie (lit. 'The Crazy Soldiers'), also known under the English-language titles Rookies Run Amok and The Five Crazy Boys, is a French comedy film directed by Claude Zidi (in his directorial debut) released in 1971. The film was a major box-office hit. It was the film breakthrough of comedy team Les Charlots (AKA "The Crazy Boys"), who remained very popular in France throughout the 1970s.

== Plot ==
Five catastrophe-prone friends—Gérard, Phil, Jean-Guy, Jean and Luis—decide to leave home and start a rock band. They find a supporter in Crème, a young woman who runs a musical instruments shop and believes in them. She enters them in a battle of the bands which turns out to be rigged, but they win despite unleashing mayhem on stage when she cheats on their behalf.

Unfortunately for them, the young men are then called up for their military service. In order to be able to take part in the next competition, they set about being kicked out by being as incompetent and uncooperative as they can be. Their musical talents are however put to use by their commanding officer, who requisitions them to play his daughter's wedding reception. Eventually, the colonel kicks them out with the exception of Gérard, whom he decides to keep as his aide. The other four, briefly delighted to be out, return for him.

== Cast ==
- Gérard Rinaldi as Gérard
- Gérard Filippelli as Phil
- Jean Sarrus as Jean
- Luis Rego as Luis
- Jean-Guy Fechner as Jean-Guy
- Jacques Dufilho as the colonel
- Jacques Seiler as Sergeant Bellec
- Marion Game as Crème
- Martin Circus as themselves
- Triangle as themselves
- Christian Fechner as the customer at the restaurant
- Francis Lemaire as the fiancé of the colonel's daughter

== See also ==
- Lists of highest-grossing films in France
