= Animal (1977 film) =

L'Animal
- Theatrical release poster
- Directed by: Claude Zidi
- Screenplay by: Michel Audiard
- Story by: Michel Audiard; Dominique Fabre; Claude Zidi
- Produced by: Christian Fechner; René Malo
- Starring: Jean-Paul Belmondo; Raquel Welch
- Cinematography: Claude Renoir
- Edited by: Monique Isnardon; Robert Isnardon
- Music by: Vladimir Cosma
- Production companies: Cerito Films; Les Films Christian Fechner
- Distributed by: AMLF
- Release date: 5 October 1977
- Running time: 100 minutes
- Country: France
- Language: French
- Budget: 25 million francs
- Box office: $7.1 million

L'Animal is a 1977 French action comedy film directed by Claude Zidi and starring Jean-Paul Belmondo and Raquel Welch. It was distributed in the United States by Analysis Film Releasing Corp under the title Stuntwoman.

The film initially focuses on two professional stunt performers, who are engaged to each other. They get injured in a car stunt on their wedding day, and then break-up their relationship and their professional partnership. After a period of unemployment, the man of the couple is offered a high-salary job. He soon wants to convince his former fiancée to rejoin their partnership. He finds out that she is currently engaged to a nobleman, and desperately tries to regain her affection before her impending wedding day.

== Plot ==
Mike Gauché (Jean-Paul Belmondo) is a professional film stuntman who works with his fiancée Jane Gardner (Raquel Welch). However minutes before their long planned marriage they are called to perform a car stunt for a movie but it goes wrong, as a brake problem causes their car to fall and they end up in a hospital with bruises and broken legs. Exasperated by the behavior of her fiancé, Jane decides to leave. After his recovery Mike is no longer able to find work in the movie business and is forced to simulate intellectual disability and to invent a family to receive Social Security benefits. One day his stuntman friend Santos asks him to replace him from time to time at his job which involves dressing up as a gorilla for advertising pasta at a supermarket.

Mike's luck begins to improve as he gets offered a high salary to do the stunts of effeminate movie star Bruno Ferrari (also played by Belmondo) whom he proves to be a dead ringer to. Ferrari, despite starring in an action movie, suffers from vertigo and is a physical coward, which makes him unable to perform even basic action scenes himself. Mike does not hesitate to get rid of his new stunt partner in order to replace her with Jane, who is enamored with the Count of Saint-Prix (Raymond Gérôme). Having heard the news, Mike goes to the Count while impersonating a server in order to propose the offer to Jane. When he hears that the Count has asked to marry Jane he manically sabotages the dinner and makes Jane promise to do the film.

Desperate to regain Jane, Mike impersonates Ferrari in an attempt to seduce her. However Jane—who knows Ferrari to be gay—is not fooled. Mike must perform a dangerous stunt on the wing of an airplane to an audience of journalists who think they are seeing Ferrari, where his life is saved from the accident by Jane, who is to marry the Count very soon. Meanwhile, the press discovers that Ferrari is not doing his own stunts.

While the wedding ceremony takes place at the castle of the Count, Mike arrives disguised as a gorilla, scaring guests with animals from the property, and takes Jane, who refuses to marry Count of Saint-Prix, preferring to live her life with Mike.

== Cast ==
- Jean-Paul Belmondo as Mike Gaucher / Bruno Ferrari
- Raquel Welch (Note: Dubbed into French by Danièle Volle) as Jane
- Charles Gérard as Hyacinthe
- Julien Guiomar as Fechner
- Aldo Maccione as Sergio Campanese
- Dany Saval as Doris
- Raymond Gérôme as Count of Saint-Prix
- Henri Génès as Camille, café owner
- Claude Chabrol as The Director
- Mario David as Santos
- Didier Flamand as The Cousin
- Josiane Balasko as Supermarket Girl
- Jacques Alric
- Henri Attal as an assistant
- Jane Birkin as The Female Star (cameo appearance)
- Johnny Hallyday as The Male Star (cameo appearance)
- Maurice Auzel
- Maurice Bénichou
- Edouard Bergara
- Paul Bisciglia
- Richard Bohringer
- Anne-Marie Coffinet]
- Raphaële Devins
- Isabelle Duby
- Martine Ferrière
- Jean-Jacques
- Jean-Jacques Moreau
- Gilles Kohler
- Yves Mourousi
- Xavier Saint-Macary
- Agathe Vannier

== Production ==
Most of the stunts in the film were done by Belmondo himself. This caused him multiple injuries; a dislocated ankle after the scene on the steps of Sacré-Cœur, dislocation and a penetrating wound after the scene in which he is tumbling down the stairs, a chewed up ear after the fight scene with a tiger. Because the insurance companies refused to insure aerial stunts they had to be filmed last. Everything went off without incident, and the actor was able to realize his childhood dream of personally standing on the wing of a flying airplane, a Fieseler Fi 156.

== Box office ==
The film sold over 3 million tickets in France. It grossed a total of $7,196,268 million at the worldwide box office.
