= Les Charlots =

French group of musicians, comedians, and actors

- Also known as: Les Problèmes (1965–1966)
- Origin: France
- Genres: Rock, pop, comedy
- Years active: 1965–1997; 2008–2025
- Past members: Gérard Rinaldi; Jean Sarrus; Gérard Filippelli; Jean-Guy Fechner; Luis Rego; Richard Bonnot

Les Charlots, known as The Crazy Boys in the English-speaking world, was a group of French musicians, singers, comedians and film actors, who were popular in the 1960s, 1970s, and early 1980s.

The group was active first from 1965 to 1966 as "Les Problèmes", under which name they made an album with the French pop singer Antoine. They renamed themselves Les Charlots, starting as a comedy music band and evolving into actors; they remained active from 1966 to 1997, then again briefly from 2008 to 2011 (as a duo). Charlots is slang for "clowns" or "doofuses", and derives from Charlie Chaplin, whose character of The Tramp was called Charlot (a diminutive for Charles) in France.

Their light-hearted comedy style was influenced by the style of popular Italian group I Brutos and by the anarchic humor of the Marx Brothers.

The original five members were Gérard Rinaldi (vocals, saxophone, accordion), Jean Sarrus (bass, backing vocals), Gérard Filippelli, a.k.a. "Phil" (guitar, backing vocals), Luis Rego (rhythm guitar, piano, backing vocals) and Jean-Guy Fechner (drums, backing vocals). Filippelli was nicknamed "Phil" as there were two "Gérards" in the group. The group was later reduced to four members, then to three, following Rego's and Fechner's departures; following Rinaldi's departure in the mid-1980s, he was replaced by Richard Bonnot in the group's later years.

== Creation of Les Problèmes ==
Rinaldi and Sarrus were musicians in various short-lived groups ("Les Rebelles" and "Les Tarés", for Sarrus) and they first met in 1963. They became friends and decided to form a rock band, even though at the time, Rinaldi was more into jazz than rock. In 1964, they were joined by Luis Rego, then in 1965 by Gérard Filippelli and Donald Rieubon on drums.

In 1965, they became the backing band for singer Antoine under the name of "Les Problèmes" ("The Problems") or sometimes "Antoine et les Problèmes" ("Antoine and the Problems"). They backed him on two his greatest hits, "Les Elucubrations d'Antoine" and "Je Dis ce que je pense, je vis comme je veux".

In 1965, while he was vacationing in Portugal (his home country), Luis Rego was imprisoned for a few months under the Salazar regime, for desertion and rebellion. During Luis' incarceration, Rinaldi wrote "Ballade à Luis Rego, Prisonnier Politique" ("Ballad to Luis Rego, Political Prisoner"), a popular song that the group often played on stage. He was replaced on stage and in the studio by guitarist Jacques Dautriche (also a singer under the alias Sullivan). Rego rejoined the band as soon as he was released.

In 1966, drummer Rieubon was called up for military service and left the band. He was replaced by William Ollivier until the band became Les Charlots.

== Success as Les Charlots ==
After a spoof of Antoine's "Je Dis ce que je pense, je vis comme je veux" released under the alias "Les Charlots" became a novelty hit, their manager convinced them to stick to comedy and switch names for good. Except for drummer Ollivier who chose to stay with Antoine. He was replaced by Jean-Guy Fechner, brother of the group's manager Christian Fechner. For their first tour they hired Dautriche and Ollivier as back-up musicians. They became instantly extremely popular for their humoristic and parodic songs like "Si tu ne veux pas payer d'impôts", "Merci Patron", "On n'est Pas là Pour se Faire Engueuler", "Paulette la Reine des Paupiettes", "Berrystock", "Sois Erotique" (a parody of Serge Gainsbourg's "Je t'aime Moi Non Plus"), "Je Suis Trop Beau" (a parody of Jacques Dutronc), "Berry Blues", "Albert le Contractuel",, "Cet été c'était toi", "Ouvre la Fenêtre", "Pétronille Tu Sens la Menthe", "Elle Avait du Poil au Ventre", "Hey Max" (a parody of Johnny Halliday's cover of "Hey Joe"), "Elle a Gagné le Yoyo en Bois du Japon (avec la Ficelle du Même Métal)", "Le Trou de Mon Quai", "La Biguine au Biniou", "Le Chou Farci", "Histoire Merveilleuse", "Chagrin d'labour", "C'est trop, c'est trop", "Ah Viens!", "Derrière Chez Moi" and "L'Apérobic".

Most of the songs were written by Rinaldi, Sarrus or Rego. Rinaldi was the main singer and the four others sang backing vocals.

After they left Antoine, they toured a lot from 1966 to 1970, first as the opening act of prestigious artists like Johnny Hallyday, Françoise Hardy, Sylvie Vartan, Claude François and even The Rolling Stones. One day, as The Rolling Stones were late for their gig, Les Charlots started playing "Satisfaction". Later in the evening, Sarrus said to Mick Jagger that, if they wanted, the Rolling Stones could play "Paulette la Reine des Paupiettes". Jagger politely refused.

In the late '60s, Les Charlots began to appear in comedy sketches on French television, most notably in an episode of satirical television cartoon Les Shadoks, with Jean Yanne and popular sitcom Les Saintes Chéries.

In 1968, Rolling Stone magazine named them the best French rock musicians.

In 1969, they recorded a cover album of songs by Boris Vian.

== Film career ==
With their increasing popularity as a genuine rock and comedy group, they received many offers to appear in films. Producer Michel Ardan hired them for their first film "because his children had seen them on television and found them very funny..." Their first film, released in 1970, was La Grande Java with comedian Francis Blanche. They played five members of a rugby team whose manager stole the money. The film wasn't very good, mostly due to the fact that Les Charlots weren't actors and didn't get along with director Philippe Clair (often considered to be one of the worst French directors ever). But surprisingly, La Grande Java was a hit with teen audiences. On the set, Les Charlots met a first AD named Claude Zidi, who later directed them in their best films.

The following films, Les Bidasses en folie (1971), Les Fous du Stade (1972), Les Charlots Font l'Espagne (1972), Le Grand Bazar (1973), Les Bidasses s'en vont en Guerre (1974) were among the group's successful comedy films. Between 1971 and 1976, the group appeared in eight films, several of which achieved commercial success in France and other countries. According to Gérard Rinaldi, the films' appeal was partly due to their visual style of comedy, which allowed audiences to understand the plots without necessarily speaking French.

About their films, Les Charlots have often said that their only criteria were the glamorous locations, warm weather and good food. None of them originally intended to become actors and they didn't think their movie career would last. They just started out of curiosity, with no ambition to become actors whatsoever. Acting in films was just the icing on the cake. But they had this youthful energy that young people of the time connected to, and after their first film became a hit, they caught the acting bug. Years after their acting debuts with Les Charlots, Gérard Rinaldi and Luis Rego pursued successful solo acting careers outside of the band.

They continued to appear on stage and record albums but movies became their main activity in the '70s.

Les Charlots wrote and performed the songs and music for most of their films.

The films focused on the group's anti-authoritarian lifestyle and free-spirited youthfulness, their friendship, freedom, love of music and pretty girls, their laziness towards work, their numerous blunders and their hatred of authority figures like the army. The films depicted the members in absurd situations and visual gags.

In Les Bidasses en Folie (1971) and sequel Les Bidasses s'en vont en Guerre (1974), they played young musicians drafted in the army, trying their best to be sent to the regiment jail rather than taking part in the manoeuvres. Their nemesis was a bald and severe sergeant named Bellec (played by character actor Jacques Seiler) who had to endure his new recruits' blunders and was ultimately always ridiculed by the boys.

In their biggest hit, Les Fous du Stade (1972) they played reluctant athletes in the Olympics.

In Le Grand Bazar (1973), they were factory workers, helping their shopkeeper friend Emile (Michel Galabru) fight against a brand new modern supermarket.

In the big budget parody From Hong Kong with Love (1975), they reluctantly replaced a recently deceased 007 when Queen Elizabeth II is abducted by villain Mickey Rooney... For the occasion, actors Bernard Lee and Lois Maxwell, cameoed in their roles from the 007 franchise as M and Miss Moneypenny respectively.

In Les Charlots Contre Dracula (1980), they became vampire hunters.

Rinaldi usually played the straight good-looking guy and the others were his goofy, faithful friends. Supporting actors like Jacques Seiler, Pierre Gualdi, André Badin, Paul Préboist, Roger Carel, Gérard Croce and renowned accordionist Aimable appeared in many of their films. They were directed four times by Claude Zidi who started his directing career with them.

They usually kept their real-life first names (Gérard, Jean, Phil, Luis and Jean-Guy) in the movies, except in the big-budget musketeers parody The Four Charlots Musketeers (1974) and sequel The Four Charlots Musketeers 2 (1974) in which they played the famous musketeers' valets, who were revealed to be the true heroes of the classic Alexandre Dumas story.

== Departures of Rego and Fechner ==
At the height of their success, Rego left the band in 1971, just before the release of their second film, Les Bidasses en Folie to focus on a (successful) solo career as an actor. The split was amicable and Rego later rejoined his friends for two movies : Le Retour des Bidasses en Folie (1983) and Le Retour des Charlots (1992). Years later, Rego said he regretted his decision because the following Charlots films were extremely successful. His main reason for leaving was that he felt the scripts for their films or for their sketches on television worked better with a four men team than with five and he sometimes felt a little lost or underappreciated in the middle of the others. He appeared in massive hit Les Bronzés in 1978.

Jean-Guy Fechner left the band in June 1976, a few months after the release of the expensive Bond parody From Hong Kong with Love. Following a dispute about unpaid royalties and disagreements about artistic choices, Les Charlots decided not to renew their contract with producer and manager Christian Fechner (Jean-Guy's brother). Les Charlots wanted to star in a satirical film written for them by auteur Bertrand Blier, named "Charlots, Charlottes", but Christian Fechner bought the rights to the script and threw it in the trash. Jean-Guy was torn between staying in the band or loyalty to his brother. He ultimately left the band.

At the time of the split with Fechner, Les Charlots were supposed to appear alongside comedy legend Louis De Funès in another film by Claude Zidi. The project was to be called "Merci Patron", after their hit song of the same name. Following their acrimonious split with Christian Fechner, the film was rewritten for emerging comedian Coluche (who had appeared with them in a small part in Le Grand Bazar), renamed L'Aile ou la Cuisse and became a huge hit, launching Coluche's film career.

With no producer and their legal issues with Christian Fechner unresolved, the band went on hiatus until 1978 and the release of their first film as a trio, the mediocre Et Vive la Liberté!

== Les Charlots as a trio ==
Rinaldi, Sarrus and Filippelli went on as a trio from 1976 to 1986, but their five subsequent films, with the lack of a decent producer, lesser budgets, mediocre scripts and directors, were less successful. Only the mediocre Et Vive la Liberté! (1978) and the camp vampire parody Les Charlots Contre Dracula (1980) were minor hits. Les Charlots Contre Dracula is the only film of the band that they wrote themselves. All of their other films as a trio misfired. In 1983, former member Rego joined his former bandmates in a supporting part in Le Retour des Bidasses en Folie, a very bad film that tried to capitalize on their 1971 hit film Les Bidasses en Folie, but where they played different characters.

Years later, Filippelli acknowledged that "if you're a fan of Les Charlots, it's best that you don't watch our last films..."

In 1979, the trio appeared in their first theatre play, "La Cuisine des Anges", a very successful experience.

In the late seventies and early eighties, the three remaining Charlots focused on new songs and albums, releasing "Fesse en Rut Majeur" (1985), an album composed of dirty lyrics, and also some of their biggest hits : "Chagrin d'labour", "La Bouche Camembert" and the very popular "L'Apérobic". They still made a lot of television appearances and despite the lesser success of their films, the trio was still very popular.

== Rinaldi's departure ==
Two years after the release and lack of success of their 14th film, Charlots Connection (1984), Rinaldi decided to leave the band to focus on his solo acting career in films, TV and on stage. Rinaldi achieved great success with sitcom Marc & Sophie from 1987 to 1991. Sarrus and Rinaldi didn't speak to each other for twenty years after Rinaldi left the band. Sarrus and Filipelli were the only two remaining members.

== The Richard Bonnot era : the beginning of the end ==
For Les Charlots, 1986 was the beginning of the end. After a hiatus following Rinaldi's departure, he was replaced in 1987 by a friend of Sarrus, small-time singer and comedian Richard Bonnot, who had been the opening act for the band a few times in the early '80s. In the following years, the three of them recorded a few more songs (including "Pour pas qu'l'amour Capote", written for an AIDS awareness campaign) but not enough material to produce a new album. They toured very sporadically in smaller venues with little or no success, playing their old hits. But without Rinaldi's immediately recognizable voice (replaced by Bonnot's), they almost sounded like a cover band.

In 1988, their old friend Antoine invited Sarrus, Filippelli, Rego and drummer Donald Rieubon to play on his latest album, Antoine Retrouve Les Problèmes (Antoine and The Problems Back Together) and on stage to promote it. It marked the first time that Les Charlots performed under the name Les Problèmes since 1966. Rinaldi was also invited but he was filming his hit TV series and couldn't appear on the album.

In 1992, the reformed trio (Sarrus, Filippelli and Richard Bonnot) appeared in the group's fifteenth and final film, the embarrassing Le Retour des Charlots, reluctantly directed by Sarrus himself because they couldn't find another director. Once again, the trio was joined by former member Luis Rego in a supporting part. It was their first film in eight years, but also their last.

Years later, Filippelli jokingly declared that "that last film with Richard Bonnot was a joke, it was nothing more than an opportunity for us to go on a paid vacation." (The film was shot in Portugal.) On the poster, Richard Bonnot's face was intentionally blurred to create a confusion with the more popular Rinaldi, who wasn't in the film. With almost no press and a limited release, Le Retour des Charlots was a critical and box office failure. At that time, Sarrus and Rinaldi were not on speaking terms. Jean-Guy Fechner was asked to appear in the film but a scheduling conflict prevented the reunion.

Jean Sarrus and Gérard Filippelli are the only members who appeared in every one of the band's 15 films.

Gérard Rinaldi appeared in 14 of them, Jean-Guy Fechner in 9, Luis Rego in 4 and Richard Bonnot in one.

== Reunions and reformation as a duo ==
The five original members (Rinaldi, Sarrus, Filipelli, Rego and Fechner) reunited on television in Michel Drucker's show, Vivement Dimanche in 2009. They spoke at length about their career. It was the first time since Rego's departure in 1971, that they all got together in the same room.

From 2008 to 2011, at the initiative of Jean Sarrus (who's always tried to keep the spirit of the band alive), Rinaldi and Sarrus reunited and toured as Les Charlots, singing medleys of the group's biggest hits for the nostalgia tour "Age Tendre et Têtes de Bois", featuring other French artists from the '60s and '70s. On that tour and the album that followed, Rinaldi and Sarrus didn't play any instruments, they only sang. They released an album of covers from their hits from the '60s and '70s named (Les Charlots 2008).

Gérard Rinaldi died of Hodgkin's disease on March 2, 2012. He was 69.

== Another trio ==
Starting in 2013 until 2025, Jean Sarrus, Jean-Guy Fechner and Richard Bonnot started touring as Les Charlots again in various festivals, but very sporadically. Fechner hadn't performed on stage since 1976.

The trio released one last album in 2023 : "Y'a pas d'âge pour les Charlots".

Former member Gérard Filipelli died of cancer on 30 March 2021. He was 78.

Jean Sarrus died of brain cancer on 19 February 2025. He was 79.

Richard Bonnot died after a long illness on 28 October 2025. He was 67.

Luis Rego and Jean-Guy Fechner are the only members of the band still alive.

== After Les Charlots ==
- Gérard Rinaldi achieved great success with French sitcom Marc et Sophie, from 1987 to 1991. He continued to appear in films and television (more than 50 TV movies) and dubbed many cartoons for cinema and television, most notably the French version of The Simpsons. He was the French voice of Krusty the Clown, Chief Wiggum and Mr. Burns. He was also the French voice of various actors like Steve Martin, Ben Kingsley, John Malkovich, Kelsey Grammer, Burt Reynolds, Dustin Hoffman and Pete Postlethwaite. At the time of his death, Rinaldi was working on "Un P'tit Air de Crooner", a solo album with covers of popular French songs. The album was released posthumously on July 23, 2012. A few days after Rinaldi's death, holding back his tears Jean Sarrus paid homage to his friend and had this to say about him : "Gérard was the soul of Les Charlots. He excelled in everything he did : he had this wonderful singing voice, but he saw himself mostly as a writer, that's what he liked to do above everything else : writing songs. I admired his great sense of humor and his ability to laugh about everything, all the time. As he was dying, he even made me laugh about his illness. I saw him on his hospital bed a few days before he died, and he just tried to make me laugh in spite of the morphine kicking in. I'm going to miss him a lot." Jean-Guy Fechner called him "a most charming and talented man". Luis Rego also reacted to his friend's death, saying that he was very sad and had a lot of admiration for Gérard Rinaldi : "he was so gifted that he would have had a great career even without the rest of the us".
- After financial problems in the 80s and 90s, Jean Sarrus briefly became a TV host (most notably as the host of a show about country music in the 90's), wrote and directed Les Charlots' last film in 1992 (basically as a late replacement because they found no other director to do it) and published "100% Charlots", a biography of the group in 2007. He appeared in Josiane Balasko's Un Grand Cri d'Amour in 1998 and in a few television films. He reunited with Rinaldi from 2008 to 2011. In 2012, after Rinaldi's death, he published a revised version of "100% Charlots" called "Définitivement Charlots". He died of brain cancer on February 19, 2025. He was 79.
- Gérard Filippelli retired from public life in 1997 but was still a musician and a philanthropist. He was working with underprivileged kids, teaching them music. He often jammed with his friend Luis Rego on the weekends. In 2011, at 68, he created and headlined a new rock'n' roll band called King Biz. He died of cancer on March 30, 2021, aged 78.
- Luis Rego is a popular and respected character actor and playwright, appearing in huge hit Les Bronzés in 1978 and with comedian Pierre Desproges in Le Tribunal des Flagrants Délires on television. In 1987, he directed his first and only film, Poule et Frites. After his departure from the group in 1971, he rejoined Les Charlots for two more films in 1983 (Le Retour des Bidasses en Folie) and 1992 (Le Retour des Charlots), in supporting parts. Recently, he appeared in Bertrand Bonello's Nocturama (2016).
- Jean-Guy Fechner never acted again but worked as a publicist for his late brother Christian Fechner, one of France's most prominent producer. He worked on the releases of many important films such as Les Bronzés 3 in 2006, supervising trailers, posters and marketing campaigns. He appeared (in cameos only) in films produced by his brother or by his son, Sébastien Fechner who is also a producer and screenwriter. His brother Christian died in 2008. Jean-Guy owns an impressive drums collection.
- Having appeared in the least successful of all their films and barely remembered for his contributions, Richard Bonnot is not considered by fans of Les Charlots as a true member of the band. After the group officially split in 1997 (but with no noticeable activities between 1992 and 1997), he made a few appearances as a comedian on television but his career remains pretty obscure. After rejoining the band in 2013 as a trio with Sarrus and Fechner, he died in 2025 after a long disease.

== Band members ==
- Gérard Rinaldi – lead vocals, saxophone, (1966–1986, 2008–2011; died 2012)
- Gérard Filippelli – guitar, backing vocals, (1966–1997; died 2021)
- Luis Rego – rhythm guitar, piano, backing vocals, (1966–1971)
- Jean Sarrus – bass, backing vocals, (1966–1997, 2008–2011, 2013–2025; his death)
- Jean-Guy Fechner – drums, backing vocals (1966–1976, 2013–2025)
- Richard Bonnot – vocals (1987–1997, 2013–2025; his death)

== Timeline ==
Les Charlots lineups
- 1966–1971: Gérard Rinaldi – lead vocals, saxophone; Jean Sarrus – bass guitar, backing vocals; Gérard Filippelli – guitar, backing vocals; Jean-Guy Fechner – drums, backing vocals; Luis Rego – rhythm guitar, piano, backing vocals
- 1971–1976: Gérard Rinaldi – lead vocals, saxophone; Jean Sarrus – bass guitar, backing vocals; Gérard Filippelli – guitar, backing vocals; Jean-Guy Fechner – drums, backing vocals
- 1976–1986: Gérard Rinaldi – lead vocals, saxophone; Jean Sarrus – bass guitar, backing vocals; Gérard Filippelli – guitar, backing vocals
- 1987–1997: Jean Sarrus – vocals; Gérard Filippelli – vocals; Richard Bonnot – vocals
- 1997–2008: Band on hiatus
- 2008–2011: Gérard Rinaldi – vocals; Jean Sarrus – vocals
- 2011–2013: Band on hiatus
- 2013–2025: Jean Sarrus – vocals; Jean-Guy Fechner – vocals; Richard Bonnot – vocals

== Discography ==
Original albums

- 1966 Antoine Rencontre les Problèmes (as "Les Problèmes")
- 1967 Charlow'up
- 1967 Les Charlots à l'Olympia (Live)
- 1968 Caf'Conc'Charlots
- 1969 Les Charlots Chantent Boris Vian
- 1969 Les Charlots - Il Etait une Fois à l'Olympia (Live)
- 1969 Charlotissimo
- 1971 Charloteries
- 1972 Les Charlots en Vadrouille
- 1972 Les Charlots à l'Olympia '72 (Live)
- 1973 Au Pays des Pesetas
- 1974 La Révolution Française (collaboration with other artists)
- 1975 Les Charlots - Youpie, c'est la Vie!
- 1976 Nouvelle Cuvée
- 1977 Et Ta Soeur
- 1983 C'est Trop, c'est Trop
- 1985 Fesses en Rut Majeur
- 1986 Parod'Hit Parade
- 1988 Antoine Retrouve Les Problèmes (Elucubrations 88) (as "Les Problèmes")
- 2008 Les Charlots 2008
- 2023 Y'a pas d'âge pour Les Charlots

Compilations

- 1972 Les Grands Succès
- 1973 12 Succès des Charlots
- 1974 Les Charlots Super Longue Durée
- 1977 Le Double Disque d'Or
- 1984 Nouvelle Edition
- 1985 Les Charlots - Programme Plus
- 1992 Plein Succès
- 1994 Les Bons Morceaux - Tout Doit Disparaître
- 1999 Collection Ambiance
- 1999 Les Charlots - Anthologie, Volume 1
- 2000 Les Charlots - Anthologie, Volume 2
- 2000 Y'a de la Joie
- 2002 Paulette, Merci Patron...
- 2003 Les Essentiels
- 2003 Les Charlots Interdits
- 2011 Les Charlots - La Compilation

== Filmography ==
- 1970 La Grande Java, directed by Philippe Clair, with Gérard Rinaldi, Jean Sarrus, Gérard Filippelli, Luis Rego and Jean-Guy Fechner.
- 1971 Les Bidasses en folie, directed by Claude Zidi, with Gérard Rinaldi, Jean Sarrus, Gérard Filippelli, Luis Rego and Jean-Guy Fechner.
- 1972 Les Fous du Stade, directed by Claude Zidi, with Gérard Rinaldi, Jean Sarrus, Gérard Filippelli and Jean-Guy Fechner.
- 1972 Les Charlots Font l'Espagne, directed by Jean Girault, with Gérard Rinaldi, Jean Sarrus, Gérard Filippelli and Jean-Guy Fechner.
- 1973 Le Grand Bazar, directed by Claude Zidi, with Gérard Rinaldi, Jean Sarrus, Gérard Filippelli and Jean-Guy Fechner.
- 1974 The Four Charlots Musketeers, directed by André Hunebelle, with Gérard Rinaldi, Jean Sarrus, Gérard Filippelli and Jean-Guy Fechner.
- 1974 The Four Charlots Musketeers 2, directed by André Hunebelle, with Gérard Rinaldi, Jean Sarrus, Gérard Filippelli and Jean-Guy Fechner.
- 1974 Les Bidasses s'en vont en guerre, directed by Claude Zidi, with Gérard Rinaldi, Jean Sarrus, Gérard Filippelli and Jean-Guy Fechner.
- 1975 Bons Baisers de Hong Kong (From Hong Kong with Love), directed by Yvan Chiffre, with Gérard Rinaldi, Jean Sarrus, Gérard Filippelli and Jean-Guy Fechner.
- 1978 Et Vive la Liberté!, directed by Serge Korber, with Gérard Rinaldi, Jean Sarrus and Gérard Filippelli.
- 1979 Les Charlots en Délire, directed by Alain Basnier, with Gérard Rinaldi, Jean Sarrus and Gérard Filippelli.
- 1980 Les Charlots Contre Dracula, directed by Jean-Pierre Desagnat & Jean-Pierre Vergne, with Gérard Rinaldi, Jean Sarrus and Gérard Filippelli.
- 1983 Le Retour des Bidasses en Folie, directed by Michel Vocoret, with Gérard Rinaldi, Jean Sarrus, Gérard Filippelli and Luis Rego.
- 1984 Charlots Connection, directed by Jean Couturier, with Gérard Rinaldi, Jean Sarrus and Gérard Filippelli.
- 1992 Le Retour des Charlots, directed by Jean Sarrus, with Jean Sarrus, Gérard Filippelli, Luis Rego and Richard Bonnot.
