= Lois Maxwell =

Canadian actress (1927–2007)

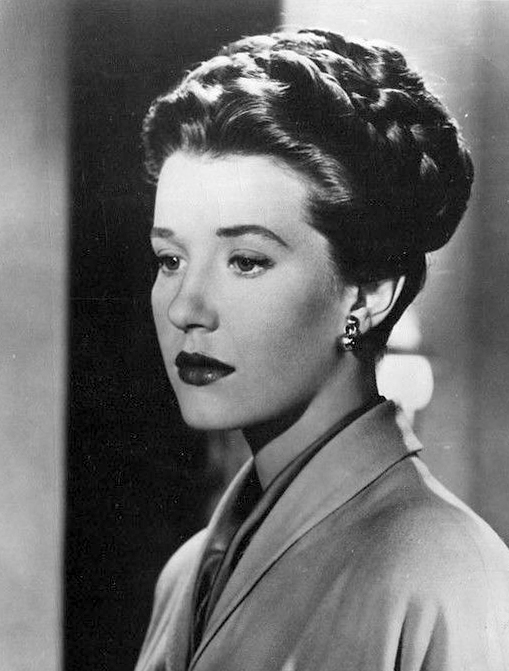
- Maxwell in The Dark Past (1948)
- Born: Lois Ruth Hooker; 14 February 1927; Kitchener, Ontario, Canada
- Died: 29 September 2007 (aged 80); Fremantle, Western Australia, Australia
- Education: Lawrence Park Collegiate Institute; Royal Academy of Dramatic Art
- Occupation: Actress
- Years active: 1946–2001
- Known for: Portraying Miss Moneypenny in the James Bond film series (1962–1985)
- Spouse: Peter Marriott (m. 1957; died 1973)
- Children: 2
- Awards: Golden Globe Award for New Star of the Year – Actress (1947)

Lois Ruth Maxwell (née Hooker; 14 February 1927 – 29 September 2007) was a Canadian actress. She was best known for portraying Miss Moneypenny in the first 14 Eon-produced James Bond films (1962–1985), from Dr. No in 1962 to A View to a Kill in 1985.

Maxwell graduated from the Royal Academy of Dramatic Art in England and began her film career in the late 1940s, winning the inaugural Golden Globe Award for Most Promising Newcomer – Actress for her performance in That Hagen Girl (1947). Dissatisfied with the quality and prominence of roles, she moved to Rome in the following decade, working in Italian cinema as both an actress and dubber.

After her marriage, she moved to the United Kingdom, where she appeared in several television productions and was eventually cast as Moneypenny. She did not appear in the 1967 adaptation of Casino Royale, and in the 1983 remake of Thunderball, Never Say Never Again, as neither of the productions was Eon's, though she did, as a similar character, appear in the spoofs O.K. Connery and From Hong Kong with Love.

== Early life and education ==
Lois Ruth Hooker was born on 14 February 1927 at St Mary's Hospital in Kitchener, Ontario to William Victor Hooker (1898–1962), a teacher, and Ruth Adelaide Wells (1900–1967), a nurse. At the time of Lois's birth, William was acting principal of Suddaby School, and the Hookers lived at 76 Filbert Street in Kitchener. In the autumn of 1927, the family moved to Toronto, where William took a position at Clinton School; he worked there until 1933, when he moved to Davisville School. In Toronto, the family lived initially at 93 Lawrence Avenue W, then moved in 1929 to 2183 Bloor W, in 1930 to 519 Windermere, in 1932 to 673 Annette, and finally in 1933 to 340 Brookdale Avenue, where Lois spent the rest of her youth. Lois attended Lawrence Park Collegiate Institute. She gained her first job working as a waitress at Bigwin Inn, a summer resort on Bigwin Island in Lake of Bays, Ontario.

During World War II she ran away from home, aged 15, to join the Canadian Women's Army Corps, formed to release men for combat duties. CWAC personnel were secretaries, vehicle drivers, and mechanics, who performed every conceivable noncombat duty. Maxwell quickly became part of the Army Show in Canada. Later, as part of the Canadian Auxiliary Services Entertainment Unit, she was posted to the United Kingdom, where she performed music and dance numbers to entertain the troops, often appearing alongside Canadian comedians Wayne and Shuster.

Maxwell's true age was discovered when the group reached London. To avoid her being repatriated to Canada, she was discharged; she subsequently enrolled at the Royal Academy of Dramatic Art, where she became friends with fellow student Roger Moore. Moore was later her on-screen colleague, in the James Bond film series, from Live and Let Die (1973) to A View to a Kill (1985).

== Career ==
Maxwell made her first film appearances in 1946, appearing (uncredited) in the British films A Matter of Life and Death (directed by Powell and Pressburger) and Spring Song. It was at this time that she changed her surname from Hooker to Maxwell, a name borrowed from a ballet dancer friend. The rest of her family also took this name.

Moving to Hollywood at the age of 20, Maxwell won the actress Golden Globe Award for Most Promising Newcomer for her role in the Shirley Temple-Ronald Reagan drama That Hagen Girl (1947). In 1949, she participated in a later famous Life magazine photo layout, in which she posed with other up-and-coming actresses, Marilyn Monroe, Cathy Downs, Suzanne Dalbert, Enrica Soma, Laurette Luez and Jane Nigh.

Despite her early acclaim, most of Maxwell's subsequent work consisted of minor roles in B films. Tiring of Hollywood, she moved back to Europe in 1950, living in Rome for the next five years. There she made a series of films, and at one point became an amateur race driver. One of her Italian films was an adaptation of the opera Aida (1953), in which Maxwell played a leading role, lip-synching to another woman's vocals and appearing in several scenes with the then unknown Sophia Loren. Another notable Italian film was Tomorrow Is Too Late, with Pier Angeli and Vittorio De Sica, which won Best Italian Film at the 1950 Venice Film Festival. She also worked as an English-language dubber.

While visiting Paris, she met her future husband, TV executive Peter Marriott. They married in 1957 and moved to London, where their daughter Melinda and son Christian were both born (in 1958 and 1959). Maxwell appeared with Patrick McGoohan in the British television series Danger Man as his accomplice in the 1959 episode "Position of Trust".

During the 1960s, Maxwell appeared in many TV series and in films outside the Bond series, in both the UK and Canada. She guest-starred in two episodes of The Saint and later in one episode of The Persuaders!; in both of which she appeared alongside Roger Moore. She provided the voice of Atlanta for the Supermarionation science-fiction children's series Stingray and starred in the CBC series Adventures in Rainbow Country from 1970 to 1971.

Maxwell had a minor role as a nurse in Stanley Kubrick's Lolita (1962). In 1963 Maxwell played a machine gun-firing nurse in the series The Avengers (episode "The Little Wonders", which was first aired on 11 January 1964). She had a guest appearance in an episode of the ITC series The Baron ("Something for a Rainy Day", 1965), as an insurance investigator.

=== Role as Miss Moneypenny ===
Maxwell lobbied for a role in the James Bond film Dr. No (1962), after her husband had suffered a heart attack, and they needed the money. Director Terence Young, who had turned her down on the grounds that she "looked like she smelled of soap", offered her either Miss Moneypenny or Bond's girlfriend, Sylvia Trench, but Maxwell was uncomfortable with the idea of a revealing scene outlined in the screenplay. The role as M's secretary guaranteed just two days' work at a rate of £100 per day, and Maxwell supplied her own clothes for the filming.

She played Moneypenny in the first 14 Eon Bond films: Dr. No (1962), From Russia with Love (1963), Goldfinger (1964), Thunderball (1965), You Only Live Twice (1967), On Her Majesty's Secret Service (1969), Diamonds Are Forever (1971), Live and Let Die (1973), The Man with the Golden Gun (1974), The Spy Who Loved Me (1977), Moonraker (1979), For Your Eyes Only (1981), Octopussy (1983), and A View to a Kill (1985).

Maxwell appeared in the Italian spy spoof O. K. Connery in 1967, with Bernard Lee (who played M) and Sean Connery's brother Neil. In the same year, she portrayed Moneypenny in a made-for-TV special, Welcome to Japan, Mr. Bond, in which she co-starred with Kate O'Mara and Desmond Llewelyn.

The role of Moneypenny was nearly recast after Maxwell demanded a pay raise for Diamonds Are Forever (1971). However, the producers felt it important to incorporate the regular character, and it was ultimately decided during production to add the scene where, disguised as a customs officer, she gives Bond his travel documents at the Port of Dover. Maxwell and Sean Connery filmed their lines separately and were not present together for the short scene. Moneypenny's undercover policewoman's cap disguises the hair Maxwell had already dyed in preparation for another part.

Maxwell stayed on as Moneypenny when her former classmate Roger Moore assumed the role of 007 in Live and Let Die (1973). She reprised her character, weeping for the death of Bond, in a short scene with Bernard Lee in the French comedy Bons baisers de Hong Kong (1975).

During the filming of A View to a Kill (1985), her final appearance as Moneypenny, producer Albert R. Broccoli pointed out to her that they were the only cast or crew members from Dr. No who had not yet left the series. Maxwell asked that Moneypenny be killed off, but Broccoli recast the role instead.

According to author Tom Lisanti, Maxwell's Moneypenny was seen as an "anchor", and her flirtatious relationship with Bond provided the films with dramatic realism and humanism; for Moneypenny, Bond was "unobtainable", freeing the characters to make outrageous sexual double entendres.

== Later life ==
Maxwell's husband died in 1973, having never fully recovered from his heart attack in the 1960s. Maxwell subsequently returned to Canada, settling in Fort Erie, Ontario, where she lived on Oakes Drive. She spent her summers at a cottage outside Espanola, Ontario, where she wrote a weekly column for the Toronto Sun under the pseudonym "Miss Moneypenny" from 1979 until 1994, and became a businesswoman working in the textile industry.

In 1994, she returned to the UK once again to be nearer to her daughter Melinda, retiring to a cottage in Frome, Somerset. A plaque has been placed on her home there by the Frome Society of Local Study.

== Death ==
Following surgery for colorectal cancer in 2001, Maxwell moved to Perth, Western Australia, to live with her son Christian's family. She remained there, working on her autobiography, until her death at Fremantle Hospital on 29 September 2007.

Of his friend's death, Sir Roger Moore said to BBC Radio 5 Live, "It's rather a shock. She was always fun and she was wonderful to be with and was absolutely perfect casting [...] It was a great pity that, after I moved out of Bond, they didn't take her on to continue in the Timothy Dalton films. I think it was a great disappointment to her that she had not been promoted to play M. She would have been a wonderful M."

== Filmography ==
Year	Title	Role	Notes
1946	A Matter of Life and Death	Actress	Uncredited
1946	Spring Song	Penelope Cobb	Uncredited
1947	That Hagen Girl	Julia Kane	
1948	Corridor of Mirrors	Lois	
1948	The Big Punch	Karen Long	
1948	The Dark Past	Ruth Collins	
1948	The Decision of Christopher Blake	Miss McIntyre	Uncredited
1949	Crime Doctor's Diary	Jane Darrin	
1949	Kazan	Louise Maitlin	
1950	Tomorrow Is Too Late	Signorina Anna	
1950	Love and Poison	Queen Christina	
1951	Brief Rapture	Erika	
1952	The Woman's Angle	Enid Mansell	
1952	Viva il cinema!		
1952	Ha da venì... don Calogero	Maestrina	
1952	Lady in the Fog	Margaret 'Peggy' Maybrick	
1952	Women of Twilight	Chris Ralston	
1953	Mantrap	Thelma Speight/Tasman	
1953	Aida	Amneris	
1955	La Grande Speranza	Lt. Lily Donald	
1956	Passport to Treason	Diane Boyd	
1956	Satellite in the Sky	Kim	
1956	High Terrace	Stephanie Blake	
1957	Time Without Pity	Vickie Harker	
1957	Kill Me Tomorrow	Jill Brook	
1959	Face of Fire	Ethel Winter	
1961	The Unstoppable Man	Helen Kennedy	
1962	Lolita	Nurse Mary Lore	
1962	Dr. No	Miss Moneypenny	
1963	Come Fly with Me	Gwen Sandley	
1963	The Haunting	Grace Markway	
1963	From Russia with Love	Miss Moneypenny	
1964	Goldfinger	Miss Moneypenny	
1965	Thunderball	Miss Moneypenny	
1967	Operation Kid Brother	Max	
1967	You Only Live Twice	Miss Moneypenny	
1969	On Her Majesty's Secret Service	Miss Moneypenny	
1970	The Adventurers	Woman at Fashion Show	Uncredited
1971	Diamonds Are Forever	Miss Moneypenny	
1972	Endless Night	Cora Walker Brown	
1973	Live and Let Die	Miss Moneypenny	
1974	The Man with the Golden Gun	Miss Moneypenny	
1975	From Hong Kong with Love	Miss Moneypenny	
1977	Age of Innocence	Mrs. Hogarth	
1977	The Spy Who Loved Me	Miss Moneypenny	
1979	Moonraker	Miss Moneypenny	
1979	Lost and Found	English Woman	
1980	Mr. Patman	Director	
1981	For Your Eyes Only	Miss Moneypenny	
1983	Octopussy	Miss Moneypenny	
1985	A View to a Kill	Miss Moneypenny	
1985	The Blue Man	Monica Duval	
1988	Martha, Ruth and Edie	Edie Carmichael	
2001	The Fourth Angel	Olivia	

== Television ==
Year	Title	Role	Notes
1956	BBC Sunday Night Theatre	Cass Edgerton	Episode: "The Reclining Figure"
1957–1963	ITV Play of the Week	Various	3 episodes
1960	Danger Man	Sandi Lewis	Episode: "Position of Trust"
1961	One Step Beyond	Esther Hollis	Episode: "The Room Upstairs"
1962	Zero One	Miss Smith	Episode: "The Marriage Broker"
1964	The Avengers	Sister Johnson	Episode: "The Little Wonders"
1964	Ghost Squad	Elizabeth Creasey	Episode: "Party to Murder"
1964–1965	Stingray	Lieutenant Atlanta Shore/Milly Carson/Marinville Tracking Station	
1966	The Baron	Charlotte Russell	Episode: "Something for a Rainy Day"
1966	Gideon's Way	Felisa Henderson	Episode: "The Millionaire's Daughter"
1966–1967	The Saint	Helen Allardyce/Beth Parrish	2 episodes
1969	Randall and Hopkirk (Deceased)	Kim Wentworth	Episode: "For the Girl Who Has Everything"
1969–1970	Adventures in Rainbow Country	Nancy Williams	
1970	Department S	Mary Burnham	Episode: "The Ghost of Mary Burnham"
1970	Omnibus	Herself	Episode: "Ian Fleming Creator of the James Bond Myth"
1970–1971	UFO	Miss Holland	Episodes: "The Cat with Ten Lives" and "The Man Who Came Back"
1971	The Persuaders!	Louise Cornell	Episode: "Someone Waiting"
1981	Front Page Challenge	Herself	Episode: "Meet Miss Moneypenny"
1987	Alfred Hitchcock Presents	Ms. Golden	Episode: "If the Shoe Fits"

== Miscellaneous ==
- James Bond: Licence to Thrill - TV Movie documentary (1987) as Herself
- In Search of James Bond with Jonathan Ross - TV Movie documentary (1995) as Miss Moneypenny
- Behind the Scenes with 'Thunderball' - Video documentary (1995) as Herself / Miss Moneypenny
- Inside 'Octopussy' - Video documentary short (2000) as Herself
- Terence Young: Bond Vivant - documentary video short (2000) as Herself
- Inside 'Dr. No' - Video documentary short (2000) as Herself
- James Bond: A BAFTA Tribute - TV Movie documentary (2000) as Herself

Preceded by Position established	Miss Moneypenny (in Eon James Bond films); 1962–1985	Succeeded by Caroline Bliss; 1987–1989
