= My New Partner =

- Theatrical release poster
- Directed by: Claude Zidi
- Written by: Claude Zidi; Didier Kaminka
- Produced by: Claude Zidi
- Starring: Philippe Noiret; Thierry Lhermitte
- Cinematography: Jean-Jacques Tarbes
- Edited by: Nicole Saulnier
- Music by: Francis Lai
- Distributed by: AMLF
- Release date: 1984
- Running time: 107 minutes
- Country: France
- Language: French

My New Partner, also called Le Cop, is a 1984 French comedy film directed by Claude Zidi that stars Philippe Noiret and Thierry Lhermitte. Noiret plays a streetwise Paris policeman who takes kickbacks from the minor criminals on his beat to allow them to continue but is assigned an idealistic new partner fresh from training. His efforts to enmesh his colleague in the prevailing corruption succeed spectacularly.

The original French title is Les Ripoux, backslang for les pourris meaning the rotten ones. It won the César Award for Best Film in 1985 and was followed by two sequels: Ripoux contre Ripoux (1990) and Ripoux 3 (2003).

== Plot ==
René has spent 20 years policing a tough quarter of Paris. Passionate about betting on horses, his dream being to become an owner, he lives with Simone, a retired prostitute. He knows all the petty crooks on his patch and lets them earn a living in exchange for favours and information. When François, an idealistic young cop from the provinces, is assigned to work alongside him, he tries to teach the new man the facts of big city life. He also fixes him up with an expensive young prostitute, Natacha.

Slowly, François' irritating high-mindedness is worn down, especially after he is beaten up by Natacha's pimp. When the pair learn that a huge consignment of heroin is to be exchanged for cash, they decide to lift the money. The crooks give chase and François succeeds in getting away with the loot but René is caught by the pursuing police. Because his official record is glowing, he only gets two years in jail. Simone and Natacha greet him on release, and out of the morning mist François arrives with the racehorse he has bought for Réné.

== Cast ==
- Philippe Noiret - René Boirond
- Thierry Lhermitte - François Lesbuche
- Grace de Capitani - Natacha
- Julien Guiomar - Commissioner Bloret
- Régine - Simone
- Claude Brosset - Vidal
- Albert Simono - Inspector Leblanc

== Accolades ==
- César Awards (France)
  - Won: Best Director (Claude Zidi)
  - Won: Best Editing (Nicole Saunier)
  - Won: Best Film
  - Nominated: Best Actor – Leading Role (Philippe Noiret)
  - Nominated: Best Original Screenplay (Claude Zidi)
