= Christian Fechner =

French film producer, screenwriter and film director (1944–2008)

- Born: 26 July 1944; Agen, France
- Died: 25 November 2008 (aged 64); Paris, France
- Occupations: Film producer, director, screenwriter

Christian Fechner (26 July 1944 – 25 November 2008) was a French film producer, screenwriter and director.

== Biography ==
Born to a family of Austrian descent, Fechner originally wished to be a stage magician. He later remained true to this first calling, winning an award for magic in 1979. However, he began working in entertainment as a talent manager for musicians, being an amateur drummer himself. Fechner launched the career of singer Antoine, who became a pop sensation in France during the 1960s.

He eventually transformed Antoine's backup musicians, Les Problèmes (which included his brother Jean-Guy Fechner), into a new comedy music band named Les Charlots. In 1970, Fechner produced les Charlots's film debut, La Grande Java; this was followed the next year by Les Bidasses en folie, which became a surprise box-office hit and turned the band into France's new comedy stars. Fechner produced several of les Charlots's next starring vehicles, including Les fous du stade and Bons baisers de Hong Kong. Fechner's association with les Charlots ended in the mid-1970s but he worked with other French comedians, notably producing several films with Pierre Richard. In 1976, he relaunched Louis de Funès's career with The Wing or the Thigh. The majority of Fechner's projects during this era resulted in major box office hits, establishing him as one of France's most prominent film producers.

During the 1970s, Fechner regularly co-produced films in association with Claude Berri. Films produced by Fechner include Viens chez moi, j'habite chez une copine, Papy fait de la résistance, Les Spécialistes, Marche à l'ombre, The Children of the Marshland, La Tour Montparnasse Infernale, and Chouchou. While generally associated with mainstream entertainment and in particular with comedies, Fechner also produced auteur cinema, including Jacques Rivette's Jean-Guy (1974) and Leos Carax's Les Amants du Pont-Neuf (1991).

In 1992, Fechner made his directorial debut with the high-budget period drama Justinien Trouvé ou le Bâtard de Dieu; the film was a commercial failure, and Fechner did not return to directing afterwards.

In 2005, he produced Les Bronzés 3: Amis pour la vie (and marked his last great success making nearly $151,211,264 at the box office.

Christian Fechner died of cancer on 25 November 2008.

Fechner had two children: film producer Alexandra Fechner and Maxime Fechner, owner of the fashion brand Kymerah.

== Filmography ==
=== Producer ===
- 1972 : Stadium Nuts (Les Fous du stade) (dir. Claude Zidi)
- 1972 : Les Charlots font l'Espagne (dir. Jean Girault)
- 1973 : Le Grand Bazar (dir. Claude Zidi)
- 1973 : I Don't Know Much, But I'll Say Everything (Je sais rien mais je dirai tout) (dir. Pierre Richard)
- 1974 : La Moutarde me monte au nez (dir. Claude Zidi)
- 1974 : Les Bidasses s'en vont en guerre (dir. Claude Zidi)
- 1975 : Bons baisers de Hong Kong (dir. Yvan Chiffre) (also screenwriter)
- 1975 : La Course à l'échalote (dir. Claude Zidi)
- 1975 : Un Sac de billes (dir. Jacques Doillon)
- 1976 : Calmos (dir. Bertrand Blier)
- 1976 : The Wing or the Thigh (L'Aile ou la Cuisse) (dir. Claude Zidi)
- 1977 : L'Animal (dir. Claude Zidi)
- 1978 : La Zizanie (dir. Claude Zidi)
- 1979 : Bête mais discipliné (dir. Claude Zidi)
- 1980 : L'avare (dir. Jean Girault et Louis de Funès)
- 1980 : Viens chez moi, j'habite chez une copine (dir. Patrice Leconte)
- 1981 : La Soupe aux choux (dir. Jean Girault)
- 1982 : Ma femme s'appelle reviens (dir. Patrice Leconte)
- 1983 : Le Ruffian (dir. José Giovanni)
- 1983 : Circulez y'a rien à voir (dir. Patrice Leconte)
- 1983 : Papy fait de la résistance (dir. Jean-Marie Poiré)
- 1984 : Marche à l'ombre (dir. Michel Blanc)
- 1985 : Les Spécialistes (dir. Patrice Leconte)
- 1985 : Moi vouloir toi (dir. Patrick Dewolf)
- 1985 : Le Mariage du siècle (dir. Philippe Galland)
- 1986 : Les Frères Pétard (dir. Hervé Palud)
- 1988 : Black Mic-Mac (dir. Thomas Gilou)
- 1988 : Mes meilleurs copains (dir. Jean-Marie Poiré)
- 1988 : Camille Claudel (dir. Bruno Nuytten)
- 1991 : La Gamine (dir. Hervé Palud)
- 1991 : Les Amants du Pont-Neuf (dir. Leos Carax)
- 1992 : Justinien Trouvé ou le Bâtard de Dieu (also director and screenwriter)
- 1995 : Élisa (dir. Jean Becker)
- 1997 : Tout doit disparaître (dir. Philippe Muyl)
- 1997 : Witch Way Love (Un amour de sorcière) (dir. René Manzor)
- 1998 : Une chance sur deux (dir. Patrice Leconte)
- 1999 : Les Enfants du marais (dir. Jean Becker)
- 1999 : La Fille sur le pont (dir. Patrice Leconte)
- 2001 : Un crime au paradis (dir. Jean Becker)
- 2001 : La Tour Montparnasse infernale (dir. Charles Némès)
- 2003 : Chouchou (dir. Merzak Allouache)
- 2004 : L'Incruste (dir. Alexandre Castagnetti et Corentin Julius)
- 2005 : L'Antidote (dir. Vincent de Brus)
- 2006 : Les Bronzés 3 : Amis pour la vie (dir. Patrice Leconte)
- 2006 : L'Entente Cordiale (dir. Vincent de Brus)
- 2007 : L'Auberge rouge (dir. Gérard Krawczyk)

Series:

- 1988 : Sueurs froides
- 1988 : Palace (dir. Jean-Michel Ribes)
- 1989 : Lemmy come-back (dir. Josée Dayan)
- 1989 : David Lansky (dir. Hervé Palud)
