= Trop c'est trop =

- Directed by: Didier Kaminka
- Written by: Didier Kaminka
- Starring: Didier Kamina; Georges Beller; Philippe Ogouz; Claude Jade; Chantal Goya; Nicole Jamet; Darry Cowl; José Luis de Villalonga; Pierre Richard
- Cinematography: Jean-Jacques Rochut
- Music by: Jean Bouchety
- Distributed by: Félix Films
- Release date: June 1975
- Running time: 90 minutes
- Country: France
- Language: French

Trop c'est trop (Too Much Is Too Much) is a French comedy film directed by Didier Kaminka in 1975.

Didier (Kaminka), Philippe (Ogouz) and Georges (Beller) were born the same day at the same hour in the same room as the war was ending. A few years later, in school, the three boys are courting, each in his way, the beautiful Edina (Claudia Wells), also born at the same time, such affection leave quite indifferent, so that it does not hesitate to denounce them when are too urgent. In the age of thirty, the three friends yet still have not reached their goal and they are desperate to do this one day, Edina has indeed disappeared. Abandoning the idea to live without her, the three men set off in his research and eventually find her exposed to the advances of a fashion photographer they get rid laboriously after escaping three babes enamored, Patricia (Claude Jade), Carole (Chantal Goya) and Nicole (Nicole Jamet). Only in Hell, after the accidental death of Edina, the triple suicide and a short passage to Paradise Didier Georges and Philippe will finally realize their dream! ...

== Cast ==
- Georges Beller: Georges
- Philippe Ogouz: Philippe
- Didier Kaminka: Didier
- Claude Jade: Patricia
- Chantal Goya: Carole
- Nicole Jamet: Nicole
- Darry Cowl: Lucifer
- Marcel Dalio: Saint-Pierre
- Claudia Wells: Edina
- José Luis de Vilallonga: The photographer
- Les Charlots: Three Guys
- Daniel Gélin: A Policeman
- Bernard Menez: The Priest
- Pierre Richard: A Policeman
- Rufus: A Policeman
- Raymond Bussières: Monsieur Taxi
- Jean Carmet
- Daniel Prévost
- Yves Robert
- Patrick Topaloff
