= Triangle (band) =

Japanese pop group

Triangle (トライアングル, Toraianguru) was a Japanese pop group that formed and debuted in the late 1970s. They released their first single, "Triangle Love Letter" in mid 1978, and their last single, "Koi wa Tekkiri Ba-Bi-Bu-Be-Bo" in 1980. The group only released two albums, Triangle Love Letter and Sanjūsō / Triangle 2 in 1978 and 1979 respectively. Sony Music Entertainment Japan released Triangle Single Collection in 2008.

== Members ==
- Mitchi (Mori Mitsuko → Komori Michiko)
- Mami (Mami → Ueno Mayumi Ueno)
- Kūko (Ōtsuka Kuniko) left the group in 1979
- Aki (Kei Aki Katō) joined the group in 1979

== Discography ==
=== Singles ===
1. Triangle Love Letter (c/w "San Shoku no Niji") [1978.04.21]
2. 0 no Meruhen (c/w "Dreaming") [1978.07.21]
3. Captain Zap (c/w "Tatchi Auto")[1978.10.01]
4. Love Locomotion (c/w "Kokoro no Todokanu Love Letter") [1979]
5. Fuyu ga Chikai (c/w "Kyanpasu") [1979]
6. Honjitsu Seiten Nari! (c/w "Wet Boy")[1980]
7. Koi wa Tekkiri Ba.Bi.Bu.Be.Bo (c/w "Gyangu ga Machi ni Yatte kita") [1980.09.21]

=== Albums ===
1. Triangle Love Letter
2. Sanjūsō / Triangle 2
3. Triangle Single Collection
