= Marc Camoletti (playwright) =

French playwright (1923–2003)

- Born: 16 November 1923; Geneva, Switzerland
- Died: 18 July 2003 (aged 79); Deauville, France
- Occupation: Playwright
- Writing career
- Period: 20th century
- Notable work: Boeing-Boeing

Marc Camoletti (16 November 1923 – 18 July 2003) was a French playwright best known for the farce Boeing-Boeing.

== Early life ==
Camoletti was born a French citizen in Geneva, Switzerland, though his family had Italian origins. His grandfather was the architect who designed the concert venue Victoria Hall in Geneva, the Musée d'art et d'histoire and the Hôtel des postes du Mont-Blanc. Marc Camoletti was a painter before starting a theatrical career.

== Career ==
Camoletti's theatrical career began in 1958 when three of his plays were presented simultaneously in Paris, the first, La Bonne Anna, running for 1,300 performances and going on to be performed throughout the world. Boeing-Boeing (1960) was an even greater success, and remains Camoletti's signature hit. The original 1962 London production, in an adaptation by Beverley Cross, opened at the Apollo Theatre, transferred to the Duchess, and ran for seven years, racking up more than 2,000 performances. A later play, Don't Dress for Dinner, also ran for seven years in London, again transferring from the Apollo to the Duchess.

Camoletti's plays have been performed in numerous languages in 55 countries. In Paris alone, 18 of his plays have totalled around 20,000 performances in all. Ten of his plays have also been shown on television, including Sexe et Jalousie. In 1979, he directed his only feature film, Duos sur canapé, based on one of his plays.

== Death ==
Marc Camoletti died in Deauville on the Normandy coast in 2003.

== Distinctions ==
- Associate of the Société Nationale des Beaux-Arts
- Chevalier de la Légion d'honneur

== Private life ==
The writer's wife, Germaine Camoletti (1924-1994), a prominent figure in the theatrical world of that time, was from the 1970s one of the directors of the Paris Theater "Michel".
