= Jacques Seiler =

French actor

Jacques Seiler (1928–2004) was a French actor.

== Selected filmography ==
- On Foot, on Horse, and on Wheels (1957) - Le garçon sortant du 'Bean's' (uncredited)
- Ces dames préfèrent le mambo (1957) - Henri Bates - le steward
- Seventh Heaven (1958) - Le curé (uncredited)
- Be Beautiful But Shut Up (1958) - Un inspecteur (uncredited)
- The Mask of the Gorilla (1958) - L'inspecteur-principal Antier
- A Dog, a Mouse, and a Sputnik (1958) - Un brigadier (uncredited)
- Head Against the Wall (1959) - Un infirmier
- The Road to Shame (1959) - Le policier dans la voiture (uncredited)
- Women Are Like That (1960) - Le commissaire
- Le caïd (1960) - Pietro
- Le Miracle des loups (1961) - L'héraut
- The Three Musketeers (1961) - Grimaud
- La dénonciation (1962) - L'homme à la 403 noire
- The Mysteries of Paris (1962) - Un acolyte
- Le chevalier de Pardaillan (1962) - La Pince
- Une blonde comme ça (1963)
- Les Bricoleurs (1963) - Le majordome du comte
- Mathias Sandorf (1963)
- Vice and Virtue (1963) - Baron Teltmann
- People in Luck (1963) - Le barman (segment "Le yacht") (uncredited)
- Sweet and Sour (1963) - Le policier
- À toi de faire... mignonne (1963)
- La belle vie (1963) - Le gendarme à la convocation (uncredited)
- Gibraltar (1964) - Kovacks
- The Gorillas (1964) - Le valet
- The Majordomo (1965) - Albert
- Chappaqua (1966)
- Who Are You, Polly Maggoo? (1966) - Le couturier Isidore Ducasse
- The Night of the Generals (1967) - Maître d'hôtel (uncredited)
- Le Désir attrapé par la queue (1967) - Big Foot
- Les encerclés (1967) - Barre
- The Return of Monte Cristo (1968) - Le patron du bar
- Erotissimo (1969) - Le bonimenteur (uncredited)
- The Blood Rose (1970) - Le policier
- Les Bidasses en folie (1971) - Sergeant Bellec
- The New Adventures of Vidocq (1971-1973, TV Series) - Desfossé
- L'oeuf (1972) - L'ancien mousse
- Stadium Nuts (1972) - Le directeur sportif de l'équipe cycliste
- The Big Store (1973) - Jacques
- The Four Charlots Musketeers (1974) - Rochefort
- The Four Charlots Musketeers 2 (1974) - Rochefort
- Les bidasses s'en vont en guerre (1974) - Sergent Bellec
- Playing with Fire (1975) - Le chauffeur de taxi / Le domestique d'Erica / Le prêtre
- One Can Always Dream (1991) - Verlinden
- Merci la vie (1991) - Inspector
- Hey Stranger (1994) - Frans
- Don't Let Me Die on a Sunday (1998) - Le passeur
- Requiem (2001) - Kaloustian (final film role)
