= The Big Store (1973 film) =

1973 French comedy film

- Directed by: Claude Zidi
- Written by: Claude Zidi; Georges Beller; Michel Fabre
- Produced by: Christian Fechner
- Starring: Gérard Rinaldi; Jean Sarrus; Gérard Filipelli; Jean-Guy Fechner; Michel Galabru
- Cinematography: Paul Bonis
- Edited by: Monique Isnardon; Robert Isnardon
- Music by: Gérard Rinaldi; Jean Sarrus; Gérard Filipelli; Jean-Guy Fechner
- Distributed by: AMLF
- Release date: 6 September 1973
- Running time: 86 minutes
- Country: France
- Language: French

The Big Store (French: Le Grand Bazar) is a 1973 French comedy film directed by Claude Zidi, starring Les Charlots.

== Plot ==
Four friends are fired from work due to their incompetence. They then decide to help a small shopkeeper who is struggling to compete with a large store nearby.

== Cast ==
- Gérard Rinaldi - Gérard
- Jean Sarrus - Jean
- Gérard Filippelli - Phil
- Jean-Guy Fechner - Jean-Guy
- Michel Galabru - Émile
- Michel Serrault - Félix Boucan
- Jacques Seiler - Jacques
- Coluche - The visitor to the apartment
