= Jean Sarrus =

French actor and singer (1945–2025)

- Born: 11 May 1945; Puteaux, France
- Died: 19 February 2025 (aged 79); Blesle, France
- Occupations: Actor, singer
- Years active: 1963–2025

Jean Sarrus (11 May 1945 – 19 February 2025) was a French actor, composer and singer. He is best known as a member of the legendary band Les Charlots.

== Life and career ==
Sarrus was born in Puteaux. After being one of the bass players for Ronnie Bird, Jean Sarrus joined the group Les Problèmes, where he played bass guitar. The group that became Les Charlots became very popular in the 1970s and starred in several comedy films that were among the biggest commercial successes of French cinema of that decade.

Sarrus died on 19 February 2025, at the age of 79.

== Filmography ==
- La Grande Java (1970)
- Les Bidasses en folie (1971)
- Stadium Nuts (1972)
- Les Charlots font l'Espagne (1972)
- The Big Store (1973)
- I Don't Know Much, But I'll Say Everything (1973)
- The Four Charlots Musketeers (1974)
- The Four Charlots Musketeers 2 (1974)
- Les bidasses s'en vont en guerre (1974)
- Trop c'est trop (1975)
- Bons Baisers de Hong Kong (1975)
- Les Charlots en délire (1979)
- Les Charlots contre Dracula (1980)
- Le Retour des bidasses en folie (1983)
- Charlots Connection (1984)
- Le Retour des Charlots (1992)
- Les Charlots Intime (2013)
