= Claude Zidi =

French film director and screenwriter

- Born: Claude Raymond Djemil Zidi; 25 July 1934 (age 92); Paris, France
- Occupations: Film director, screenwriter

Claude Zidi (born 25 July 1934) is a French film director and screenwriter. From 1971, he became known as a director of comedies, the majority of which were box-office hits in France. He was one of France's most commercially successful directors between the 1970s and the 1990s. In 1985, he won the César Award for Best Director for his film My New Partner (Les Ripoux).

== Early life ==
Claude Raymond Djemil Zidi was born in Paris to a father of Algerian descent and a French mother. He graduated from the École nationale de photographie et cinématographie. Following his studies, he was drafted to the Algerian War, during which he worked in the French Armed Forces' audiovisual service.

== Career ==
After returning to civilian life, he began his career in the film industry as a cinematographer and a cameraman. The directors he worked with include Jacques Demy (Bay of Angels, 1963) and Claude Chabrol (Line of Demarcation, 1966).

In 1970, Zidi worked as a cameraman on La Grande Java, the first film starring the comedy team Les Charlots (known in the English-speaking world as The Crazy Boys). He befriended the group of actors, to whom he pitched a synopsis for what would become their next film, Les Bidasses en folie (1971). Les Charlots specifically requested that Zidi be the director of the picture. Les Bidasses en folie was an immense and unexpected box-office success, turning Les Charlots into France's new comedy stars. Zidi directed three more films with Les Charlots, produced by Christian Fechner and Claude Berri, which were also commercial hits: Les Fous du stade (1972), Le Grand Bazar (1973) and Les Bidasses s'en vont en guerre (1974), the latter being a sequel to their first film together.

Now known as a specialist of mainstream burlesque comedies, Zidi continued his association with Fechner by directing Pierre Richard, also at the time one of France's new comedy stars, in La Moutarde me monte au nez (Lucky Pierre, 1974) and La Course à l'échalote (The Wild Goose Chase, 1975). Both films paired Richard with Jane Birkin. Zidi next directed Louis de Funès and Coluche in L'Aile ou la cuisse (The Wing or the Thigh, 1976) which was a great box-office success and came to be regarded as a comedy classic in France. The next year, Zidi directed L'Animal, starring Jean-Paul Belmondo and Raquel Welch; in 1978, he directed Louis de Funès again in La Zizanie. While most of Zidi's films were very successful at the box office, they were generally dismissed at the time by French critics. Nevertheless, while the critical reception of Zidi's films with Les Charlots was particularly poor, the 1974 release of Lucky Pierre reversed that trend for a time, with critics appreciative of his association with Pierre Richard.

Zidi's next box-office hits, both released in 1980, were Les Sous-doués, which was Daniel Auteuil's film breakthrough, and Inspecteur la Bavure (Inspector Blunder) starring Coluche and Gérard Depardieu. These were followed by Les Sous-doués en vacances (1982), a sequel to his 1980 film, and Banzaï (1983), again with Coluche.

In 1984, Zidi directed Les Ripoux (My New Partner) starring Philippe Noiret and Thierry Lhermitte, a cynical, less burlesque, comedy about police corruption which was a major box-office hit. For that film, he won the César Award for Best Director, and was also nominated for Best Original Screenplay, improving Zidi's critical standing.

In 1987, Zidi directed Association de malfaiteurs (Association of Wrongdoers) a comedy with social undertones, which was commercially successful and also enjoyed a good critical reception. In 1989, he essayed drama with Deux, a romance film starring Gérard Depardieu and Maruschka Detmers, but that film failed at the box office. He then returned to comedy with Ripoux contre ripoux (1989), a sequel to My New Partner, and La Totale! (1991), an action comedy that was later remade in Hollywood as James Cameron's True Lies.

In 1993, the crime film Profil bas, starring popular singer Patrick Bruel, was a box-office disappointment. This was followed by another failure, the comedy Arlette starring Josiane Balasko and Christopher Lambert (1997). Zidi returned to success in 1999 by directing the first live action Asterix film, Asterix and Obelix vs. Caesar.

In 2000, Zidi, and James Cameron with him, were sued by screenwriter Lucien Lambert, who claimed that La Totale ! (and consequently True Lies) had been plagiarized from one of his own unproduced screenplays. The court ruled in Zidi and Cameron's favor in 2001, but the Court of Appeal of Paris reversed the ruling in favor of Lambert three years later. Zidi was ordered to pay Lambert US$15 million (his profit percentage for the box office receipts of True Lies), while Cameron was found not liable for damages.

Zidi's next directed La Boîte (2001) and Ripoux 3 (2003), a new sequel to My New Partner with Noiret and Lhermitte again reprising their roles. His last work as a director was a 2011 television film co-directed with his son Julien, which was pitched as a pilot for a series based on My New Partner. The pilot was broadcast on TF1, but was not picked up for a series. Zidi then decided to retire, citing the lack of success of his later films, the evolution of the French film industry, and the personal stress he had experienced due to the La Totale ! plagiarism lawsuit.

== Personal life ==
Zidi married three times, and had six children. One of his sons, Julien Zidi, who had a career as an assistant director then as a television director, died in 2021 following a motorcycle accident. Another son, Claude Zidi Jr., is also a film director. One daughter, Hélène Zidi, is an actress and acting coach. His granddaughter Lola Zidi (Hélène's daughter) is also an actress.

== Filmography as director ==
Year	Original title	English title	Notes
1971	Les Bidasses en folie	Rookies Run Amok / The Five Crazy Boys	Featuring Les Charlots
1972	Les Fous du Stade	Stadium Nuts	Featuring Les Charlots
1973	Le Grand bazar	The Big Store	Featuring Les Charlots
1974	Les Bidasses s'en vont en guerre		Featuring Les Charlots
1974	La Moutarde me monte au nez	Lucky Pierre	
1975	La Course à l'échalote	The Wild Goose Chase	
1976	L'Aile ou la cuisse	The Wing or the Thigh	
1977	L'Animal	Animal / Stuntwoman	
1978	La Zizanie	The Spat	
1979	Bête mais discipliné		
1980	Les Sous-doués	The Under-Gifted	
1980	Inspecteur la Bavure	Inspector Blunder	
1982	Les Sous-doués en vacances		
1983	Banzaï		
1984	Les Ripoux	My New Partner	César Award for Best Film; César Award for Best Director
1985	Les Rois du gag		
1987	Association de Malfaiteurs	Association of Wrongdoers	
1989	Deux		
1989	Ripoux contre ripoux	My New Partner II	
1991	La Totale!		Remade as True Lies
1993	Profil bas		
1997	Arlette		
1999	Astérix et Obélix contre César	Asterix and Obelix vs Caesar	
2001	La Boîte		
2003	Ripoux 3	My New Partner III	
2011	Les Ripoux anonymes		TV movie, co-director with Julien Zidi

Preceded by Ettore Scola for Le Bal	César Award for Best Director; 1985; My New Partner	Succeeded by Michel Deville for Péril en la demeure
