= Gérard Rinaldi =

French actor and musician (1943–2012)

- Born: February 17, 1943; Paris, France
- Died: March 2, 2012 (aged 69); Fontenay-les-Briis, France
- Occupations: Actor; musician; lyricist; artistic director
- Years active: 1969–2012

Gérard Rinaldi (February 17, 1943 – March 2, 2012) was a French actor, musician, lyricist, artistic director and singer with Les Charlots.

== Death ==
Rinaldi died of lymphoma on March 2, 2012. He was 69. A few days later, holding back his tears Jean Sarrus (Les Charlots) paid homage to his friend and had this to say about him : "Gérard was the soul of Les Charlots. He excelled in everything he did : he had this wonderful singing voice, but mostly as a writer, that's what he liked to do above everything else : writing songs. I admired his great sense of humor and his ability to laugh about everything, all the time. As he was dying, he even made us laugh about his cancer, I saw him on his hospital bed and he just tried to make me laugh in spite of the morphine kicking in. I'm going to miss him a lot." Luis Rego (Les Charlots) also reacted to his friend's death, saying that he was very sad and had a lot of admiration for Gérard Rinaldi : "he was so gifted that he would have had a great career even without Les Charlots".

Ten days after Rinaldi's death, the theatre world was reunited at Le Théâtre de la Michodière in Paris for a special homage. Ex-members of Les Charlots Jean Sarrus, Jean-Guy Fechner and Richard Bonnot (Rinaldi's replacement in the group from 1986 to 1992) were present to pay their respects. Actors Gérard Jugnot, Marie-Anne Chazel, Marie-Pierre Casey, Marthe Villalonga and many others paid their respects to their friend.

The Théâtre de la Michodière was chosen for the homage, because Rinaldi had appeared there four times in his stage career 1986 Double Mixte, 1992 La Puce à L'Oreille, 1994 Bobosse, 2004 Le Canard à l'Orange.

== Partial filmography ==
- La grande java (1971) - Philippot
- Daisy Town (1971)
- Les Bidasses en folie (1971) - Gérard
- Stadium Nuts (1972) - Gérard
- Les Charlots font l'Espagne (1972) - Gérard
- The Big Store (1973) - Gérard
- I Don't Know Much, But I'll Say Everything (1973) - Un soldat (uncredited)
- The Four Charlots Musketeers (1974) - Planchet
- The Four Charlots Musketeers 2 (1974) - Planchet
- Les bidasses s'en vont en guerre (1974) - Gérard
- Trop c'est trop (1975)
- Bons Baisers de Hong Kong (1975) - Gérard
- Et vive la liberté! (1978) - Gérard
- Les Charlots en délire (1979) - Gérard de
- Les Charlots contre Dracula (1980) - Gérard
- Le retour des bidasses en folie (1983) - Un bidasse
- Charlots connection (1984) - Gérard
- Descente aux enfers (1986) - Elvis
- La vie dissolue de Gérard Floque (1986) - Francis Clément
- Funny Boy (1987) - Lambros
- Feu sur le candidat (1990) - Le flic à RTL
- Al centro dell'area di rigore (1996) - Oreste
- Quelqu'un de bien (2002) - Directeur thalasso 1
- Après la pluie, le beau temps (2003) - José Bretelle

== Roles of note ==
- Watership Down - Hazel (French dub)
- The Great Mouse Detective - Ratigan (French dub)
- An American Tail - Henri (French dub)
- The Little Mermaid (1989 film) - Chef Louis (French dub)
- A Goofy Movie - Goofy (French dub)
- Balto - Steele (French dub)
- Little Shop Of Horrors - Orin Scrivello (French dub)
- An All Dogs Christmas Carol - Charlie Barkin (French dub)
- Rocko's Modern Life - Heffer (French dub)
- Tarzan - Clayton (French dub)
- The Simpsons - Mr. Burns (French dub)
- Father of the Pride - Larry (French dub)
