= Jean Halain =

French screenwriter

Jean-Marie Hunebelle, known professionally as Jean Halain, born 14 January 1920 in Paris, died 14 September 2000 in Juvisy-sur-Orge, was a French film screenwriter.

Son of André Hunebelle, he was a scriptwriter and screenwriter of numerous films of Louis de Funès.

== Screenwriter ==
- 1948 : Métier de fous, directed by André Hunebelle
- 1949 : Millionaires for One Day, directed by André Hunebelle
- 1950 : Women Are Crazy, directed by Gilles Grangier
- 1950 : La Rue sans loi, directed by Maurice Labro
- 1952 : My Husband Is Marvelous, directed by André Hunebelle
- 1954 : Cadet-Rousselle, directed by André Hunebelle
- 1955 : L'Impossible Monsieur Pipelet, directed by André Hunebelle
- 1956 : Casinos de Paris, directed by André Hunebelle
- 1956 : Thirteen at the Table, directed by André Hunebelle
- 1958 : Taxi, roulotte et corrida, directed by André Hunebelle
- 1959 : Le Bossu, directed by André Hunebelle
- 1960 : L'assassin est dans l'annuaire, directed by Léo Joannon
- 1960 : Le Capitan, directed by André Hunebelle
- 1961 : The Count of Monte Cristo, directed by Claude Autant-Lara
- 1961 : Le Miracle des loups, directed by André Hunebelle
- 1962 : Méfiez-vous, mesdames, directed by André Hunebelle
- 1962 : Les Mystères de Paris, directed by André Hunebelle
- 1964 : Fantômas, directed by André Hunebelle
- 1964 : Le Tigre aime la chair fraîche, directed by Claude Chabrol
- 1965 : Furia à Bahia pour OSS 117, directed by André Hunebelle
- 1965 : Fantômas se déchaîne, directed by André Hunebelle
- 1966 : Le Grand Restaurant, directed by Jacques Besnard
- 1967 : Oscar, directed by Edouard Molinaro
- 1967 : Fantômas contre Scotland Yard, directed by André Hunebelle
- 1967 : Le Fou du labo 4, directed by Jacques Besnard
- 1968 : Sous le signe de Monte-Cristo, directed by André Hunebelle
- 1969 : Hibernatus, directed by Edouard Molinaro
- 1970 : L'Homme orchestre, directed by Serge Korber
- 1970 : Sur un arbre perché, directed by Serge Korber
- 1973 : The Four Charlots Musketeers, directed by André Hunebelle
- 1974 : The Four Charlots Musketeers 2, directed by André Hunebelle
- 1974 : C'est pas parce qu'on a rien à dire qu'il faut fermer sa gueule, directed by Jacques Besnard
- 1976 : The Porter from Maxim's, directed by Claude Vital
- 1977 : Le Maestro, directed by Claude Vital
- 1977 : Gloria, directed by Claude Autant-Lara
- 1978 : Ça fait tilt, directed by André Hunebelle
- 1980 : L'Avare, directed by Jean Girault and Louis de Funès
- 1981 : La Soupe aux choux, directed by Jean Girault
