= Gaumont =

French film studio

Gaumont SA
- Logo used since 2026
- Formerly: L. Gaumont & Cie (1895–1906); Société des Établissements Gaumont (1906–1930); Gaumont-Franco-Film-Aubert (1930–1938); Société Nouvelle des Établissements Gaumont (1938–1943; 1944-1975); Société Marseillaise des films Gaumont (1943–1944)
- Type: Public
- Traded as: Euronext Paris: GAM; CAC All-Share
- ISIN: FR0000034894
- Industry: Motion pictures
- Founded: 6 July 1895; 131 years ago
- Founder: Léon Gaumont
- Headquarters: Neuilly-sur-Seine, France
- Area served: Worldwide
- Key people: Nicolas Seydoux (chairman); Sidonie Dumas (CEO)
- Products: Motion pictures Television programs Film distribution
- Revenue: ▲€212.2 million (2021)
- Net income: ▲€1.0 million (2021)
- Total assets: ▲€206.4 million (2022)
- Total equity: ▲€255.9 million (2011)
- Owner: Sidonie Dumas (89.7%)
- Number of employees: 227 (2021)
- Subsidiaries: Gaumont Television; Gaumont Animation; Gaumont Vidéo; GP Archives; Éditions La Marguerite
- Website: gaumont.fr (France) gaumont.com (America)

Gaumont SA (French: [ɡomɔ̃]) is a French film and television production and distribution company headquartered in Neuilly-sur-Seine, France. Founded by the engineer-turned-inventor Léon Gaumont (1864–1946) in 1895, it is the second film studio after The Black Maria and the oldest extant film company in the world, established before other studios such as Pathé (founded in 1896), Titanus (1904), Nordisk Film (1906), Universal Pictures, Paramount Pictures and Nikkatsu (all founded in 1912).

Gaumont predominantly produces, co-produces, and distributes films, and in 2011, 95% of Gaumont's consolidated revenues came from the film division. The company is also a producer of TV series through Gaumont Télévision and animation through Gaumont Animation as well as its existing French production features. Gaumont is run by Nicolas Seydoux (chairman) and Sidonie Dumas (CEO). Iconic for its daisy logo, the company holds a library of over 1,600 films, including hits like Intouchables and The Fifth Element. The company has six offices in five countries, and also has specific teams for its non-French units.

== History ==
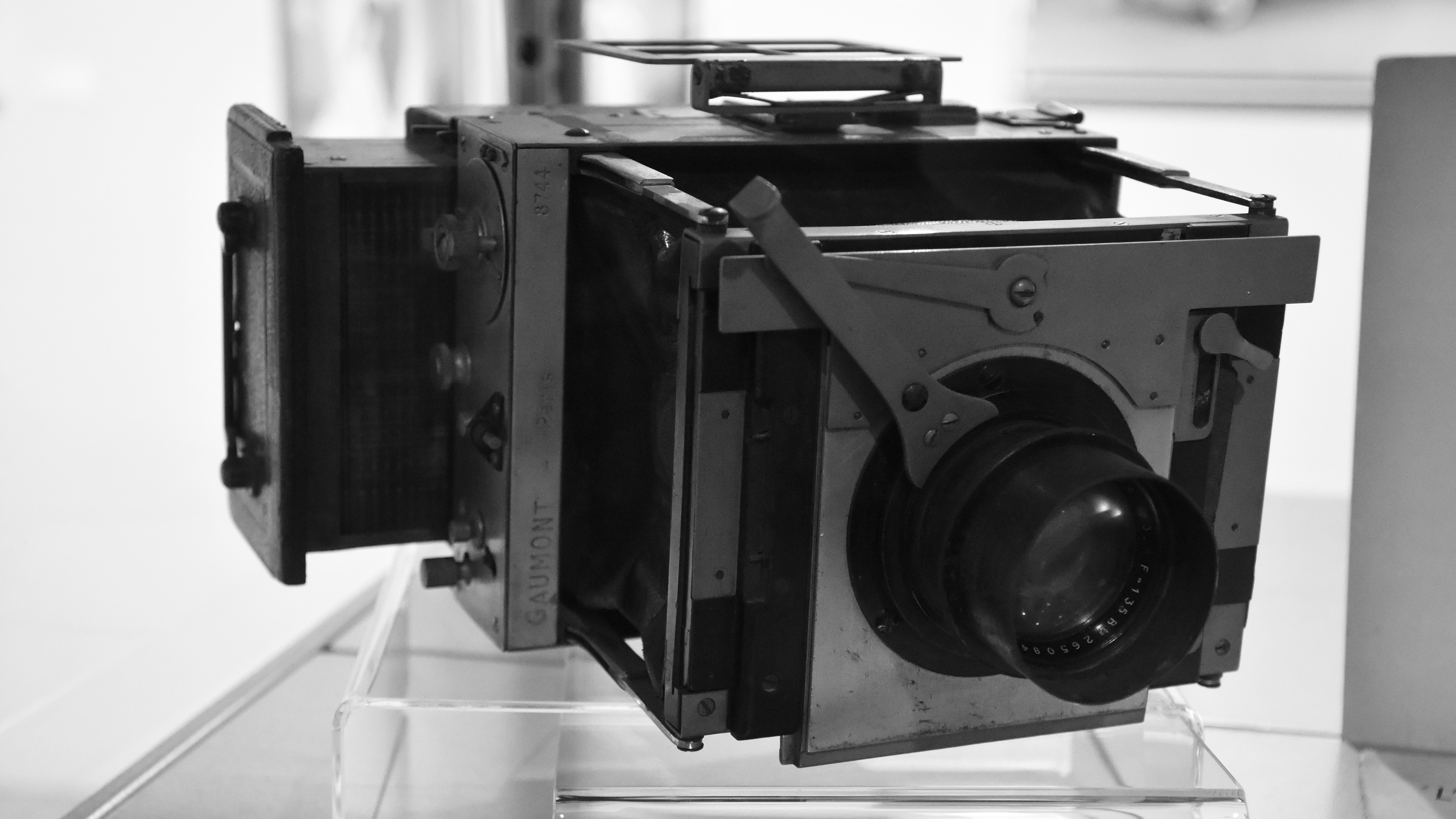
A Spido reportage at the Fotomuseum Antwerp

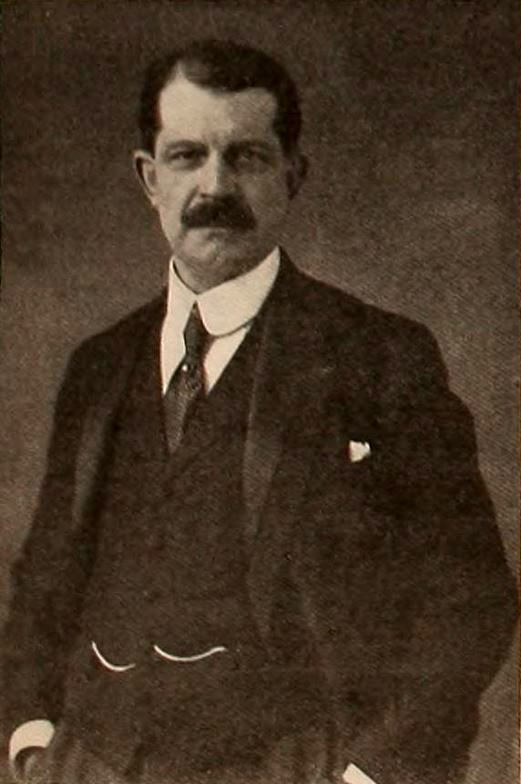
Léon Gaumont, founder of the group and important inventor in the field of cinema

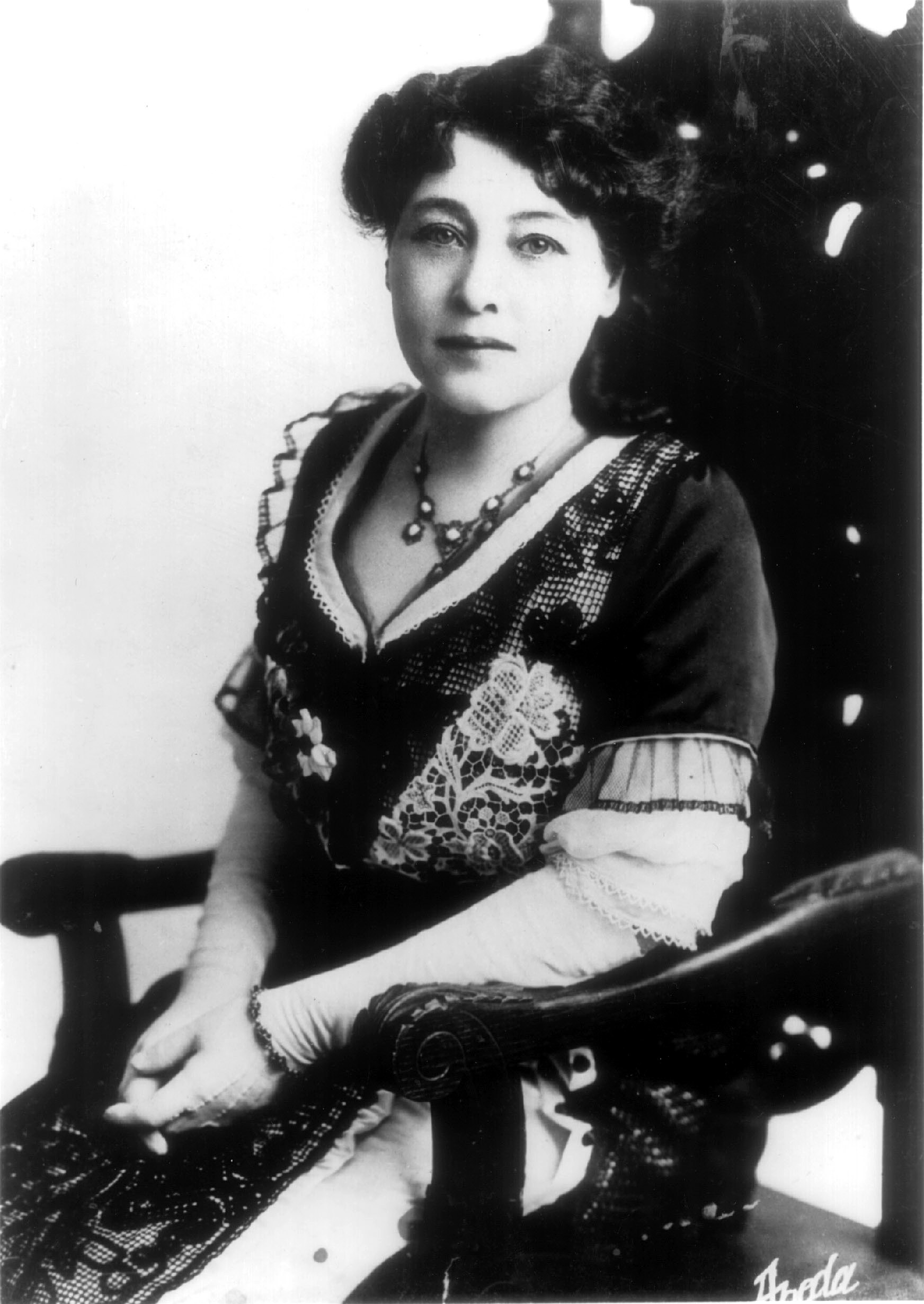
Alice Guy, first woman film director, launched by Léon Gaumont and later head of production at Gaumont.

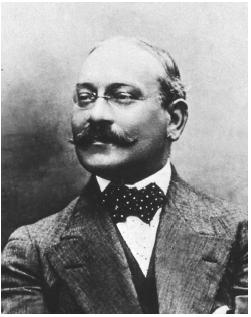
Louis Feuillade, successor to Alice Guy, later a leading silent film director.

Originally dealing in photographic apparatus, the company began producing short films in 1897 to promote its make of camera-projector. Léon Gaumont's secretary Alice Guy-Blaché became the motion picture industry's first female director, and she went on to become the Head of Production of the Gaumont film studio from 1897 to 1907. From 1905 to 1914, its Cité Elgé studios (from the normal French pronunciation of the founder's initials L-G) in La Villette, France were the largest in the world.

World domination

In 1907, Alice Guy left Gaumont and recommended Louis Feuillade to Léon Gaumont as her successor, a decision he accepted and never regretted.

In 1908, Gaumont released La Fantasmagori, directed by Émile Cohl, considered the first animated film.

In 1909 the company participated in the Paris Film Congress, a failed attempt by European producers to create a cartel similar to that of the MPPC in the United States.

Fantasmagorie (1908), the first animated film in cinema, produced by Gaumont

Gaumont also launched into movie theaters around 1908. In 1911, Gaumont opened the largest cinema in the world, the Gaumont Palace, which was located in Paris and had up to 6,400 seats. It was demolished in 1973.

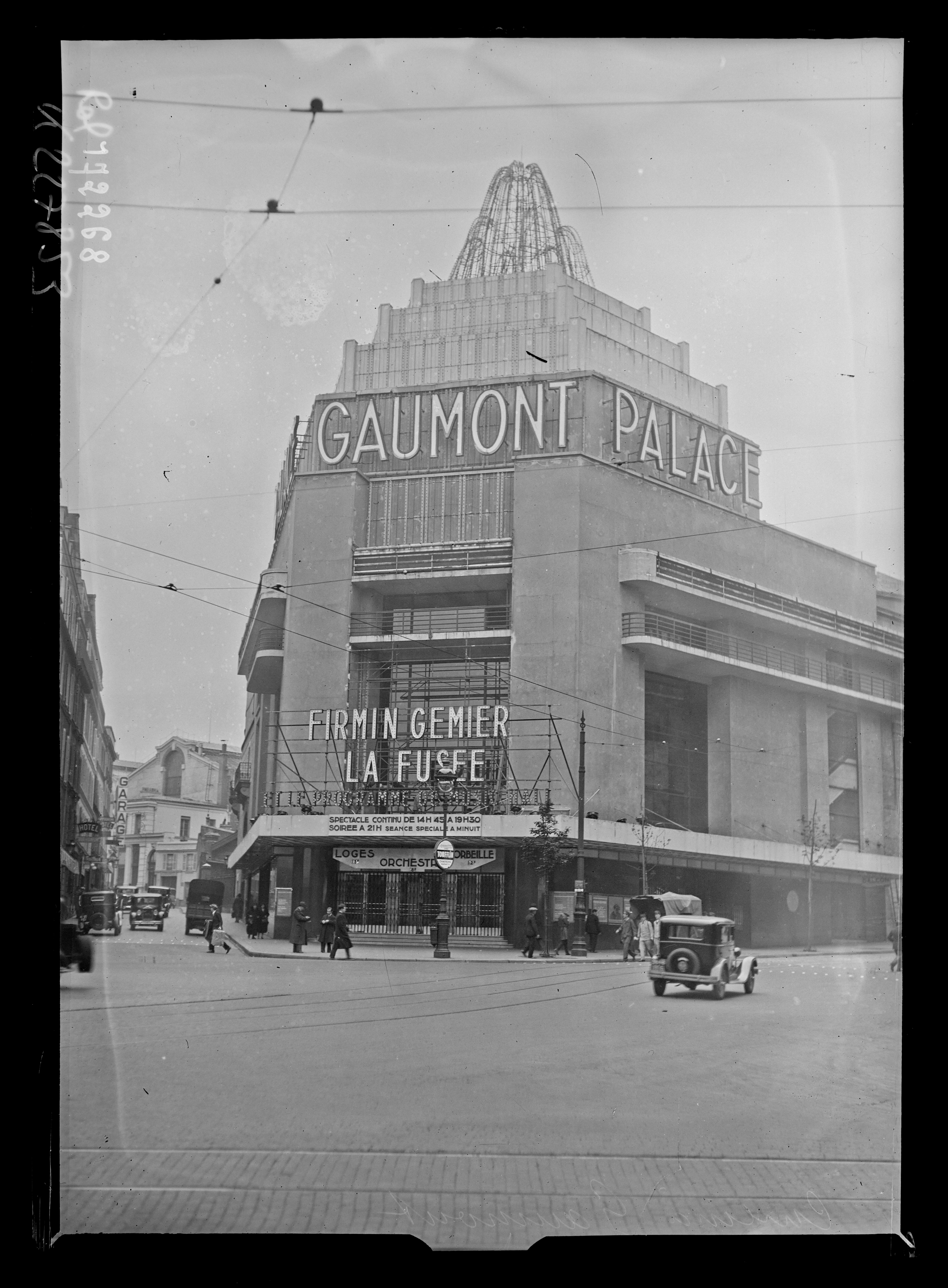
Exterior of Gaumont Palace in 1933

Fantômas of Louis Feuillade

In 1913, Louis Feuillade, artistic director of the company, persuaded Léon Gaumont to acquire the rights to the Fantômas series of novels. The adaptation was a significant success. Feuillade's Fantômas, regarded as the first cinematic serial, marked a major turning point in film history. The series not only enabled the Gaumont company to compete with Pathé, the global leader in cinema at the time, but also launched the popularity of the cinematic serial and played a key role in popularizing suspense and detective thrillers, genres that were relatively uncommon at the time.

In 1913, Gaumont introduced Chronochrome, one of the very first color film processes created directly during shooting rather than by coloring after filming. This innovation was developed by Léon Gaumont himself, who had long harbored the ambition of bringing color to motion pictures. Chronochrome was an additive process based on the simultaneous recording of red, green, and blue. To reduce stress on the film during projection, the image height was reduced from four to three perforations, creating a widescreen format similar to 16:9. Extremely costly, Chronochrome did not end black-and-white filmmaking but brought significant prestige to Gaumont and to Léon Gaumont personally.

From 1914 to 1915, Léonce Perret took over as artistic director of Gaumont after Louis Feuillade's departure for the front. Feuillade was demobilized in 1915 due to heart problems. He took the opportunity to return to the Gaumont studio, and Perret continued his career in the United States a few years later. At the same time, competitor Pathé was preparing to release its cinematic serial The Perils of Pauline in France, after the huge success of the saga in the United States. Léon Gaumont then commissioned Feuillade to create a series to counter that of Pathé, which gave birth to the director's most iconic work: Les Vampires, a cinematic serial of ten episodes, released at a rate of one per month. Filming conditions, in the midst of the First World War, were particularly difficult, since the actors could be mobilized at any moment. Gaumont and Feuillade adapted by masking secondary characters, or by killing off protagonists whose actors were going to be mobilized. The script was created day by day to be able to adjust. Les Vampires became one of Gaumont's biggest successes and popularized the archetype of the femme fatale throughout the world, thanks to the character of Irma Vep, played by the actress Musidora.

Gaumont opened foreign offices and acquired the theater chain Gaumont British, which later notably produced several films directed by Alfred Hitchcock such as The 39 Steps (1935) and The Lady Vanishes (1938). Along with its competitor Pathé Frères, Gaumont dominated the motion picture industry in the world until the outbreak of war in 1914.

After the First World War, Gaumont suffered economic losses owing to increased competition from American Hollywood productions. In 1925, the studio's output decreased to only three films. In addition, Gaumont was unable to keep pace with the cost of technological changes, e.g., the advent of sound movies.

In 1927, Warner Bros appropriated the invention of talking pictures with the film The Jazz Singer, although Léon Gaumont had succeeded in making sound films as early as 1902 with his invention, the chronophone, which Alice Guy used extensively by shooting hundreds of phonoscenes. Thanks to the patents he had filed at the time, the Gaumont company filed a complaint against Warner Bros and, after a legal battle lasting nearly 20 years, won the case.

Difficulty

Struck by mounting debts in the early 1930s and the effects of the Great Depression, Gaumont declared bankruptcy in 1935. In 1937, the studio ceased production and operated only as a theater and distribution company. The company was purchased by the French corporation Havas in 1938, was renamed Société Nouvelle des Etablissements Gaumont, and reopened its film production studio.

During the Second World War, Gaumont was severely affected by censorship, with all of its films produced before 1937 being banned and withdrawn from circulation. The company's production capacity was greatly reduced during this period, and it was forced to contend with a new competitor endowed with considerable resources, Continental Films, created by Nazi propaganda minister Joseph Goebbels. Despite these constraints, Gaumont nevertheless managed to produce nine films between 1942 and the liberation, including Les Cadets de l'Océan by Jean Dréville and Le Journal tombe à 5 heures, the first film produced by Alain Poiré, who would later become one of Gaumont's most prominent producers. At the time of the Liberation, Gaumont reported 240 employees killed or missing since the beginning of the war, as well as several cinemas destroyed.

In 1947, the company released Antoine et Antoinette, which became the first major post-war commercial success produced by the group. The film was produced by Alain Poiré, who had by then taken over as head of the company's production division.

During that time, Gaumont partnered with Compagnie Parisienne de Location de Films to produce and distribute films and co-marketed together, until CPLF was renamed to Gaumont Distribution. However, the global interest in French New Wave films in the 1950s, as well as the permissiveness within French films (e.g., nudity), allowed French productions to successfully compete against an American cinema that was still burdened by conservative moral codes. The period was to see the return to prominence of Gaumont Studios.

=== New growth ===
In the 1960s, Gaumont's production division recovered with the success of Les Tontons Flingueurs, as well as numerous successful films starring the famous French actor Louis de Funès.

In 1970, media tycoon and French old money heir multimillionaire Nicolas Seydoux started managing Gaumont and becomes a vice-president at the company. Within two years he puts into place a restructuring phase and halted its productions, with Seydoux imposing his veto on certain projects. he personally owned 60% of the shares and 70% of the votes. It was likely that the new policy imposed was to change its production structure, with less "mainstream" films. Although he had a significant number of box-office hits, Alain Poiré had his place in danger, following the failure of Rum Runners, which was a costly production.

In 1972, Schlumberger put up Gaumont for sale: Rum Runners didn't help recoup its losses. Ambitious producer Jean-Pierre Rassam intended to acquire Gaumont with Seydoux and Toscan du Plantier and had promised various projects to bail out the company, but the balance sheet of his company Ciné qua non did not play into this his favor between the budget overruns or commercial failures of the films Chinese in Paris, Don't Touch the White Woman! and Lancelot du Lac. The Schlumberger group sells its shares, estimated at 40%, to Nicolas Seydoux and Daniel Toscan du Plantier.

With these events, Nicolas Seydoux succeeds his brother Jérome Seydoux at the front of the company. The policy he undertook reconciled popular films and those with a more restricted audience: Alain Poiré ultimately remained in his position, to continue the production of major popular films, and Seydoux appointed Daniel Toscan du Plantier as its general manager. René Bonnell, Gaumont's distribution director from 1978 to 1982, explains that Seydoux had to coexist a Tuscan du Plantier, who arrived in 1976-1977 and who wanted to change everything, with a more traditional Poiré. On the economic level, Poiré was the financial support of the group thanks to all its big successes (La Boum, La Chèvre, the Belmondo films etc.), and their theatrical runs in the halls was modernized by Nicolas Seydoux. Concerning Toscan, that the economic balance of his interventions was proven, but he was the essential complement, young, open, to a house which needed this touch of madness. A house whose imaginary value, apart from balance sheet values, was increased by this extraordinary abundance around Tuscan.

Between 1974 and 2000, the production division achieved numerous successes, producing and distributing French films that went on to become cult classics, such as the trilogy "Now Where Did the 7th Company Get to ?" which parodies the total defeat of French troops against German troops during the beginning of the Second World War, the first films of Luc Besson, which were shot in English and most of them with an American cast, such as Subway, Léon the Professional, The Big Blue, The Fifth Element or even La Femme Nikita. Gaumont also produces a huge number of cult comedies in France, notably La Chèvre, Les Visiteurs, Le Grand Blond avec Une Chaussure noire ans Le retour du Grand Blond and The Dinner Game ("Le Dîner de Cons") not to be confused with the American remake "Dinner for Schmucks" which is not produced by Gaumont and which received negative feedback.

In this period, Gaumont bought shares in some media assets. In 1978, the company became the part-owner of a US cable channel, Telefrance USA, followed in 1981 by a share in Le Point, a conservative magazine. In 1983, its US cable outlet ceased due to a lack of an interested buyer, while at the same time, the company was reporting losses, causing the shutdown of its Italian branch (due to the emergence of private television stations) as well as the sale of its Brazilian branch. In 1986, it was part of the Gilbert Gross-led consortium that set up TV6, the channel closed down after one year on air due to the complex political scenario after the 1986 legislative elections, where the two new channels (the other being La Cinq) were granted without a legal tender. Gaumont's share in Le Point, by then at over 80%, was sold to Générale Occidentale in September 1993.

From 1980 to the end of the 1990s, Gaumont became, for the first time in its history, the leading Frenchand even European film producer, surpassing the other French historical group Pathé.

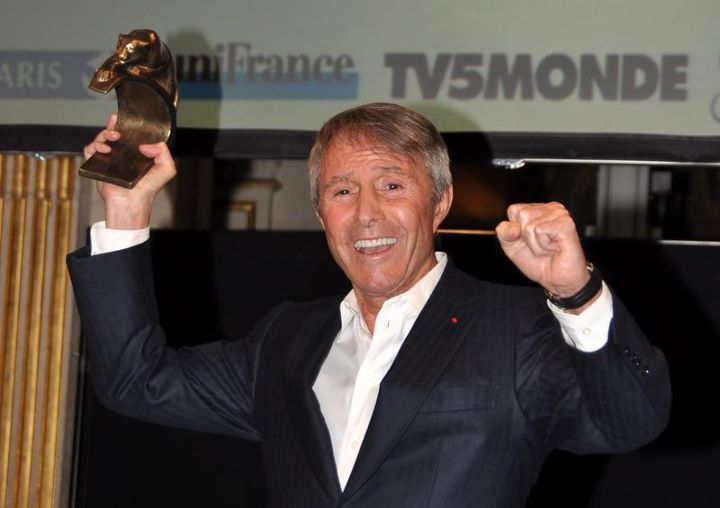
Francis Veber, famous director and screenwriter who worked with Gaumont.

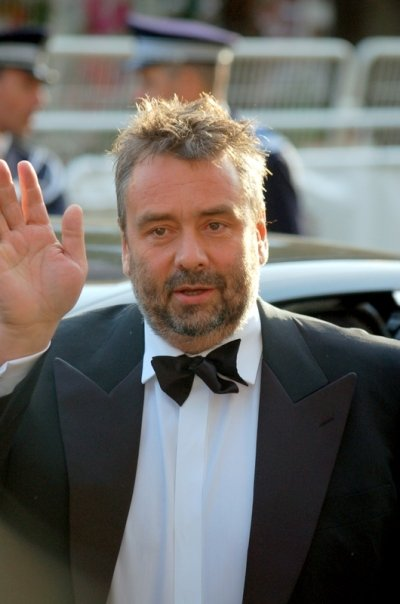
Luc Besson, famous director and screenwriter who worked exclusively with Gaumont until the year 2000.

At the end of the 1990s, faced with several underperformances, combined with the departure of Luc Besson, who at the time was the most profitable director for Gaumont and French cinema (and who left to found his company EuropaCorp, which still exists), as well as the retirement of Francis Veber (very important comedy director), and then in 2000 the death of one of the company's most important producers, Alain Poiré, Gaumont experienced a reversal of fortune and lost its leading position. This decline occurred alongside the resurgence of its historic competitor Pathé, which regained strong momentum in cinema exhibition, production, and distribution, while StudioCanal also increased its influence. Nevertheless, Gaumont remains one of the major studios in French and European cinema and has gradually managed to recover from this period of crisis.

In the 1990s, the company operated TV and multimedia divisions, which was divested at the end of the 1990s. The television division was sold to company executive Christian Carret, who turned it into GTV, while the multimedia division's animation unit were sold to management and renamed Xilam, and the multimedia division continued producing video games until 2004.

Gaumont–Columbia–TriStar Films logo (2004–2007)

On 2 February 2000, Philippe Binant, technical manager of Digital Cinema Project at Gaumont, realized the first digital cinema projection in Europe with the Texas Instruments prototype projector. From 1993 to early 2004, Gaumont and Disney had a partnership for producing films for theater distribution.

In 2001, Gaumont spun off the cinema division into a joint venture with Pathé since known as Les Cinémas Gaumont Pathé. Gaumont owned a 34% stake in the entity, which controls a large cinema network in France, Switzerland, and the Netherlands. As of 2011, this stake was worth €214 million. In 2004, Gaumont continued its development with Pathé to set up another joint venture, Gaumont-Pathé Archives. Gaumont owns 57.5% of this entity, which contains newsreels, documentaries, and silent movies from the 20th and 21st centuries. From early 2004 to 2007, the company had a partnership with Sony for producing films and for theater and DVD distribution worldwide. And for many years, Gaumont's home video division was a joint venture with Sony Pictures. Currently, Gaumont distributes its films through ESC Distribution on home media in France since 2020, and formerly through Paramount Home Entertainment. At the end of 2007, Gaumont took over the French animation studio Alphanim for €25 million and renamed it Gaumont Alphanim. As of 2013, it is known as Gaumont Animation.

Gaumont produced in 2006 and 2009 two French films that have since become cult classics, OSS 117: Cairo, Nest of Spies and OSS 117: Lost in Rio. While they are parodies of James Bond, they became cult films because they go beyond simple parody, combining retro spy adventure with politically incorrect satire and biting humor.

On 16 December 2010, Gaumont acquired a 37.48% stake in the share capital of the Légende company and its subsidiaries for €6.6 million. Légende is a full-length film and television series production and distribution company managed by Alain Goldman. As of 2011, the Légende stake is worth €6.3 million. 2011 was the year that Gaumont opened its Gaumont International Television division in Los Angeles.

In 2011, Gaumont co-produced and co-distributed The Intouchables, which became France's highest-grossing movie of all time.

The international release of The Intouchables was equally successful, trumping previous international blockbusters such as Harry Potter and Transporters in Germany. Intouchables is the highest-grossing foreign-language movie (any language other than English) beating the previous record of $275 million by the Japanese Spirited Away. The film was a major catalyst for Gaumont's boosting fourth-quarter 2011 cinema sales to €47.9 million, up 651% year on year. The film's success turned a half-year 2011 loss to a record annual €26 million profit. The Intouchables currently has a box office of $361 million.

In 2012, Gaumont acquired the production company Nouvelles Éditions de Films (NEF) for €3.1 million. The company was previously run and created by cinema legend Louis Malle. As part of the acquisition, Gaumont now owns the entire Malle collection, including Ascenseur pour l'échafaud, Atlantic City, and Au Revoir les Enfants. In February 2012, Gaumount restarted its television division which had been defunct for about ten years. On 2 May 2016 according to Deadline Hollywood, Gaumont teamed with Lionsgate, and seven other international companies to launch the Globalgate Entertainment consortium. Globalgate will produce and distribute local-language films in markets around the world. Lionsgate said it had partnered with international entertainment executives Paul Presburger, William Pfeiffer and Clifford Werber to launch Globalgate. In 2019, Gaumont was replaced by TF1 Studio as Globalgate's new French member. On 1 March 2017, Gaumont sold its 34% stake in Les Cinémas Gaumont Pathé to Pathé for $400 million in order to focus on production.

In January 2018, it was announced that the company's first office, in Cologne, Germany, would open in July 2018. The office was to focus on development and production of premiere drama programming, according to film producer and new manager Sabine de Mardt.

One month later in February of that same year following Gaumont's launch of its German production unit in Germany, Gaumont launched a British television production division and second office based in London, England marking its second expansion and a return to the British production industry after selling its division Gaumont-British in 1940s with former Kudos producer Alison Jackson leading the UK division.

=== 2020s ===
The historic group is going through a difficult period, like much of the sector, following the COVID crisis and the resulting drop in attendance, especially since, after selling its cinemas to Pathé in 2017, the group now relies solely on the production and distribution of its films. Gaumont continues to release around eight films per year in theaters in France.

The group's largest post-COVID budget to date is Les Rayons et les Ombres by Xavier Giannoli, a World War II film starring french star Jean Dujardin on collaboration, with a budget exceeding €30 million (approximately $35 million). At the same time, the group continues producing series, notably Lupin on Netflix.

In 2022, Gaumont announced the development of an ambitious Robin Hood project, and confirmed at the end of 2025 that it is still in preparation. In April 2022, it was working on four films to be released on the Paramount+ service, as well as having 40 TV projects in varying stages. The company had a new strategy by producing "lighter" titles to offset the effects caused by lockdowns. Theatrical operations, however, are mostly limited to the French market.

As of 2024, just a single cinema continued to bear the Gaumont name, that in Disney Village. It is intended that this cinema will be refurbished and rebranded as Pathé in the second half of 2026.

== Production ==
Gaumont currently has nearly 1,500 films in its catalogue, most of which are in French; however there are some exceptions such as Luc Besson's The Fifth Element (1997), Luc Besson's Leon : the professional (1994), Luc Besson's The Big Blue (1988).

Among the most notable films produced by Gaumont are the serials Louis Feuillade's Judex (1916), Louis Feuillade's Les Vampires (1915) and Louis Feuillade's Fantômas (1913), the comic Onésime series, starring Ernest Bourbon; and the comic Bébé series, starring five-year-old René Dary. The two biggest films to which Gaumont owns the rights are Jean-Marie Poiré's Les Visiteurs, with a box-office of $98 million. The Fifth Element, the largest-budget film in Gaumont's history ($90 million), grossed nearly $264 million, and Intouchables (2011) by Olivier Nakache and Éric Toledano, with a box office of $427 million.

Gaumont also produced and distributed numerous films starring the famous French actor Louis de Funès, including Le Grand Restaurant (1966), Hibernatus (1969), La Folie des Grandeurs (1970) or the Fantômas from the 60s : Fantômas (1964), Fantomas se déchaîne (1964) and Fantomas contre Scotland Yard (1967)

Abel Gance, a director and the early animator Emile Cohl worked for the studio at one time or another. The company has also produced television shows, including seven animated series: Highlander: The Animated Series, Space Goofs, The Magician, Dragon Flyz, F Is for Family, and Sky Dancers (the second and third are based on their respective toy lines), and the very popular Oggy and the Cockroaches. The company also produced two series through its American unit Gaumont International Television: Hannibal and Hemlock Grove. The studio has been described as a mini-major studio.

== Corporate structure ==
Ciné Par is a majority shareholder with 69.92% of the voting rights: this entity is controlled by CEO Nicolas Seydoux. The other private shareholders are First Eagle Investment Management, Bolloré, and Groupe Industriel Marcel Dassault. The company has a free float of 416,784 shares, which represents 9.75% of the capital and 5.99% of the voting rights.

== Gaumont Television ==
Gaumont Television is the television division of Gaumont which was established in 2010.

Gaumont opened its first production office dedicated to television series production in 1963.

In January 2000, in order for Gaumont to refocus on its film production and cinema multiplex businesses, Gaumont sold off its remaining shares of its former television company GTV Productions (the original Gaumont Television) to its president Christian Charret alongside French television production company Tele Images whom merged it with GTV Productions as it became a subsidiary of Tele Images whilst retaining the GTV name as Tele Images began distributing GTV's series and its programming library worldwide through Tele Images' distribution division Tele Images International.

Apple TV pushed the release date of Gaumont's scripted drama series to 4 March 2026, The Hunt (Traqués), after investigating claims that the show may have been plagiarized from the 1973 novel, Shoot (as well as the 1976 USA/Canadian film of the same name). The similarities were significant as The Hunt is now billed as "a series by Cédric Anger based on the novel Shoot by Douglas Fairbairn, which was first adapted into a feature film of the same name, directed by Harvey Hart from a screenplay by Richard Berg." The adjustment follows deals that Gaumont has made with the rightsholders of the book and film. (Fairbairn died in 1997). The six-episode series is executive produced by Sidonie Dumas, Isabelle Degeorges, Clémentine Vaudaux and Alexis Barqueiro.

== Visual identity ==
Léon Gaumont selected the ox-eye daisy as the company logo to pay homage to his mother, whose first name was Marguerite (Daisy). Its first appearance dates back to 16 March 1903 when Léon Gaumont registered the first version of the daisy (slightly resembling a sunflower), with the Elgé inscription in the center, French phonetic version of the founder's initials. (L. G.) Elge was renamed Gaumont lorsque when the company was renamed Société des Établissements Gaumont in 1906. Léon Gaumont requires the brand to be present in "at least one scene from each strip and even two scenes".

Throughout the decades the logo has been redesigned several times, but the daisy has always remained present, even though its significance has been largely forgotten. Following Gaumont-Franco-Film-Aubert's bankruptcy, Société Nouvelle des Établissements Gaumont recovered the 1906 monogram, though it was not until 1942, when the company returned to production with Le journal tombe à cinq heures that the company introduced a new logo. After the war, it absorbed its distribution subsidiary, Compagnie Parisienne de Location de Films (CPLF), by combining the globe from the company as part of its new identity. On screen, Gaumont Distribution adopted a theme composed by Marc Lanjean, film composer and cousin of company director Alain Poiré.

In 1970, Gaumont commissions a new animated logo at the Ciné-Télé-Réalisations (CTR) laboratories. The opening logo began with the globe from its predecessor, surrounded by sun rays resembling petals of a daisy. The theme was composed by François de Roubaix, who was also working for L'homme orchestre for the company, which he wanted to use as debut. He created an initial four-note fanfare, with brass instruments and timpany, but Gaumont found it "too dry". He then created a second one, using eighteen strings, two trumpets, a bassoon and a timpani. It had three variations, the first of which ended up being selected. The rejected versions included a second version with a chorus following the climax of the jingle (which François wanted to use), composed of three men and four women, and a third one, based on the choral version, added drum beats at the end. To de Roubaix's surprise, the new logo did not appear on L'Homme orchestre, as he planned, appearing on screen only a few months later. The partition was rearranged a couple times when the company changed its opening logo.

For the company's landmark centennial in 1995, Gaumont adopted a redesign of its logo designed by Les Quatre Lunes. On screen, a retrospective of all the firm's previous emblems appears, with music by Bertrand Burgalat, ending in space with the new logo revealed. However, a lawsuit broke out between the composer and the firm. The company's opening logo changed in 2003, created by the Bronx agency: a boy climbs a hill with a flower at its top, and picks the daisy, which flies away, grows and unfolds into a red rosette in a starry sky, with the company's name appearing. The music was made at the Laplage studio, arranged by Chassol.

In 2010, Gaumont changed their visual identity and it takes up the principle of the halo of petals: the red daisy has twelve irregular petals which take the form of a luminous halo around the letter G. The logo, made by Lorène Bruant for the Les Quatre Lunes agency, is inspired by the praxinoscope to create dynamism and adopts a tailor-made, sans-serif typography. The principle used was to create a less "authoritative" identity. The shade of red used changed from 187C to 186C. Although it was unveiled in December 2010, it did not appear on theatrical releases until spring 2011. A new custom typeface was also designed. Designed for the screen again by the Bronx agency, it is accompanied by the first bars of the well-known aria (cavatina) Casta Diva from the opera Norma composed by Vincenzo Bellini.

Gaumont unveiled a new logo to the public on 7 May 2026, adopting an all-uppercase typeface, launched during the 2026 Cannes Film Festival. The music for the new opening logo was composed by Thomas Roussel.

== Financial information ==
In the first half of 2012, Gaumont recorded a profit of €7.7 million, which reversed the €0.6 million loss from the first half of 2011. The profit was driven by a 49% increase in revenue, which reached €50.1 million. The company cited the continued effects of Intouchables, which increased International revenues by 153%. Gaumont's market capitalization as of January 2010 is €164 million.

On 5 July 2017, the Dassault and Bolloré families withdrew their shares from Gaumont, falling below the 10% voting power limit and 5% capital limit at the company.
