= De Funès =

De Funès is a French surname. Notable people with the surname include:

- Louis de Funès (1914–1983), French actor
- Olivier de Funès (born 1949), French retired pilot and actor
- Isabelle de Funès (born 1944), French actress and singer
