= Pascal Mazzotti =

Pasquale "Pascal" Mazzotti (16 December 1923 in Saint-Étienne-de-Baïgorry – 19 June 2002 in Saint-Ouen-l'Aumône) was a French actor who has appeared in film, television, and theater. He is known for having played a role in Hibernatus with Louis de Funès, as well as provided the voice of Le roi (The King) in the animated feature film, Le Roi et l'oiseau (The King and the Mockingbird).

Mazzotti is buried in Thiais, Val-de-Marne.

== Filmography ==
Year	Title	Role	Notes
1952	The King and the Mockingbird	Le roi	Voice
1956	Cela s'appelle l'aurore	Azzopardi	
1956	Short Head	Le maître d'hôtel	
1957	Burning Fuse	Le pharmacien	
1957	An Eye for an Eye	Le barman	
1958	Back to the Wall	Jérôme	
1958	The Possessors	Le chauffeur	Uncredited
1959	Toi, le venin	L'homme de la discothèque	
1959	Les affreux		
1959	Rue des prairies	Max, le valet de chambre	
1959	Come Dance with Me	Le barman	
1960	Dialogue of the Carmelites		Uncredited
1960	Love and the Frenchwoman	Desk clerk	(segment "Virginité, La")
1961	All the Gold in the World	Un speaker	
1962	Arsène Lupin Versus Arsène Lupin	Le commissaire de Dieppe	Uncredited
1962	Comment réussir en amour	Le vendeur d'appartements	Uncredited
1964	Les Yeux cernés	Le notaire	
1967	Le dimanche de la vie		
1969	A Very Curious Girl	L'abbé Dard	
1969	Hibernatus	Le professeur Bibolini	
1970	Mont-Dragon	Armand Dubois - un entomologiste	
1970	L'âne de Zigliara	Le juge Cyprien	
1971	Perched on a Tree	Le speaker TV	
1971	Una stagione all'inferno		
1973	Les volets clos		
1976	The Twelve Tasks of Asterix		Voice
1978	Freddy	L'huissier Bouisse	
