= L'homme orchestre =

1970 film

- Directed by: Serge Korber
- Written by: Jean Halain; Serge Korber
- Produced by: Alain Poiré
- Starring: Louis de Funès
- Cinematography: René Goliard
- Edited by: Robert et Monique Isnardon, assisted by Inès Collignon
- Music by: François de Roubaix
- Production company: Gaumont International
- Distributed by: Gaumont Distribution
- Release date: 18 September 1970
- Running time: 85 minutes
- Country: France
- Language: French

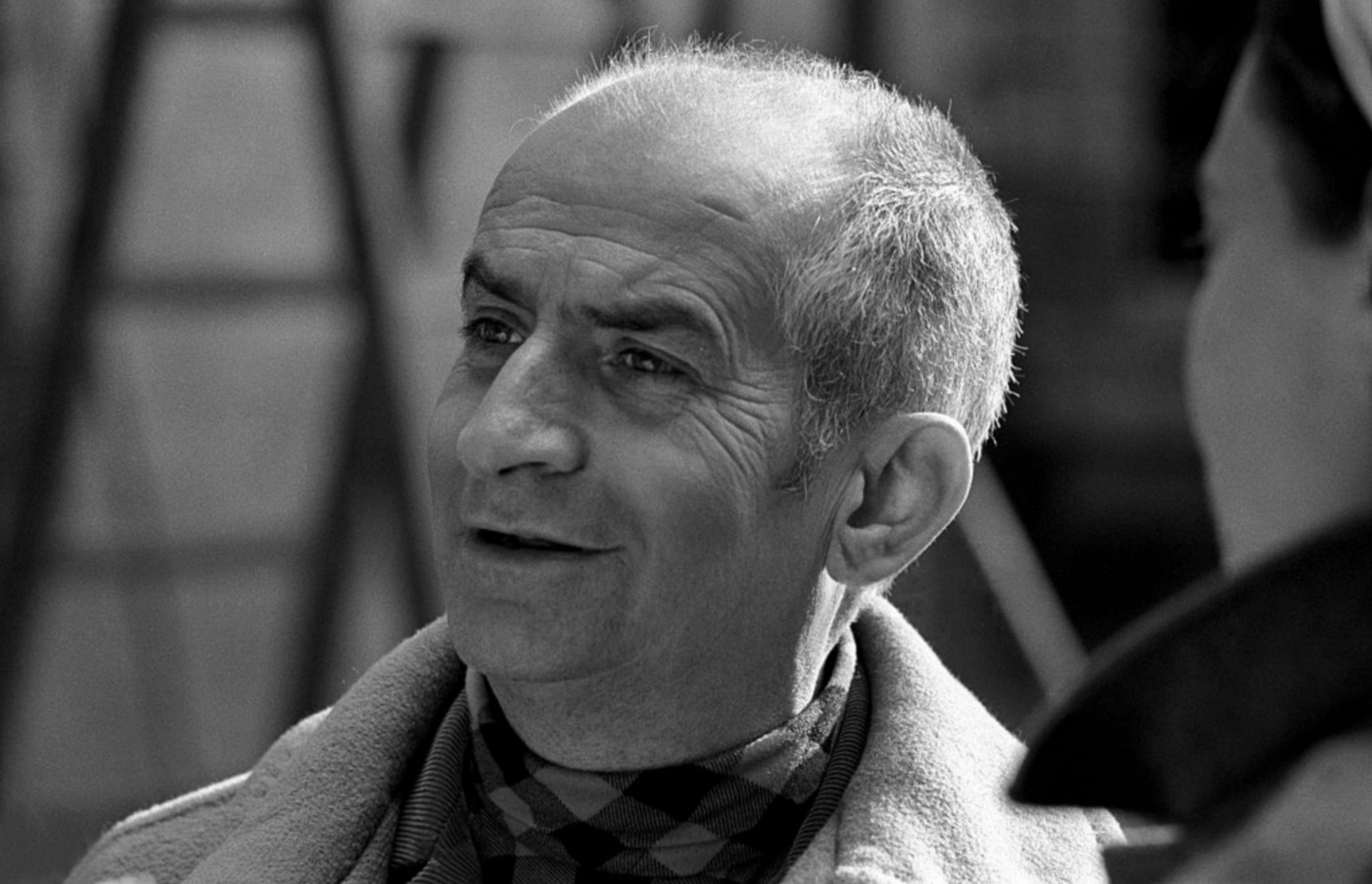
Louis de Funès, on the set of the movie, in 1970.

L'homme orchestre (pronounced [lɔm ɔʁkɛstʁ]) is a comedy film from 1970 directed by Serge Korber, written by Jean Halain, and starring by Louis de Funès. It tells the story of Evan Evans, who owns and manages a ballet company in the Principality of Monaco with an iron fist.

== Summary ==
The film opens in the contemporary dance company of Evan Evans (Louis de Funès). To him, weight gain and personal lives are forbidden; the dancers must dedicate themselves body and soul to the dance.

One of the dancers decides to leave the troupe to get married, so Evans enlists the help of his nephew Philippe, (Olivier de Funès), and his assistant Françoise (Noëlle Adam) to conduct auditions and to find a new star. He falls under the spell of newcomer Endrika's (Puck Adams) talent, and enthusiastically welcomes her into the troupe.

Like the other members, Endrika is asked to end all romantic engagements, even as Françoise is enjoying a secret affair. Upon learning of her relationship, Evans ends the romance by taking a recording of a conversation between Philippe and Françoise wherein Philippe is rebuked. Evans is able to break up Françoise and her lover Franco Buzzini (Franco Fabrizi) by playing the tapes over a phone call to him.

During a tour in Italy, Endrika is forced to pick up her secret son from his foster family, which she has concealed from the rest of the troupe. Unable to find a nanny quickly, she decides, on Françoise's advice, to make Evans believe, by means of a letter, that the child was his nephew's from one of his previous tours in Italy.

Evan Evans then asks Philippe for an account, in order to confirm the story and to find out the mother. Philippe believes that the story is true, and tells Evans that the child must be his and that the mother must be a young Sicilian woman (Paola Tedesco) with whom he had an affair. Evans decides to go and meet the girl's parents, in order to clarify matters. When he arrived in Italy, he discovers with horror that the baby boy is not hers, but that she had indeed had a little girl with Philippe, whom he inherits and is obliged to take back to the hotel.

Evan Evans asks his nephew again to find out who else the little boy's mother might be. Philippe decides the mother must be must be the maid of a Roman marquis (Franco Volpi). Evans goes to visit the Marquis, and learns that he has married his maid himself, and that the maid has never had a child. Confused, he returns to the hotel. Philippe has no idea who else the little boy's mother might be.

Evans and Philippe find a nanny to take care of the two children, they hide the children in huge drums to take them out of the hotel. Endrika, Françoise and the other dancers discover the children's disappearance, believe that they have been kidnapped, and inform the Italian police, who quickly find Evan Evans and Philippe and question them.

Evans and Philippe unsuccessfully try to explain to the commissioner (Marco Tulli) why they are transporting two babies in drums, but, fortunately, the arrival of the dancers and the mother of the little girl help to clarify things. Philippe announces his marriage with the Sicilian woman.

== Cast ==
- Louis de Funès : Monsieur Édouard, Evan Evans
- Noëlle Adam : Françoise
- Olivier de Funès : Philippe, Evan Evans's nephew
- Daniel Bellus : Young motorist
- Paul Préboist : Manager of the Roman hotel
- Franco Fabrizi : Franco Buzzini
- Max Desrau : A motorist
- Micheline Luccioni : The passenger who dredges on the yacht
- Martine Kelly : dancer who gets married
- Daniel Bellus : The young motorist in the red light
- Jacqueline Doyen : A motorist in the red light
- Christor Georgiadis : Chris, taker of sound and cook of the troops
- Vittoria Di Silverio: Rome's woman
- Paola Tedesco : The Sicilian girl
- Tiberio Murgia : The Sicilian father
- Marco Tulli : The commissioner
