= Jacques Besnard =

French film director, assistant director, producer, actor and screenwriter

- Born: Jacques Besnard; 15 July 1929; Le Petit-Quevilly, Seine-Maritime, France
- Died: 9 November 2013 (aged 84); Boutigny-Prouais, Eure-et-Loir, France
- Years active: 1955–2004

Jacques Besnard (Also known as Jacques Treyens; born 15 July 1929 in Le Petit-Quevilly - died 9 November 2013 in Boutigny-Prouais) was a French film director, assistant director, producer, actor and screenwriter. Best known for Le Grand Restaurant (1966), Le Fou du labo 4 (1967) and La situation est grave... mais pas désespérée (1976).

== Life and career ==
Jacques Besnard was born on 15 July 1929 in Le Petit-Quevilly, Seine-Maritime, France. He began his career in 1962 as the first assistant to director André Hunebelle, after having had some previous experience as an actor in 1955 and as an assistant director under Maurice Régamey, Yves Robert and Alberto Lattuada between 1956 and 1961. Besnard worked alongside Hunebelle on movies such as: Les Mystères de Paris (1962), Banco à Bangkok pour OSS 117 (1964), Fantômas (1964), Furia à Bahia pour OSS 117 (1965) and Fantômas se déchaîne (1965). It was during this time that Besnard met actor Louis de Funès when they worked together on the two Fantômas movies.

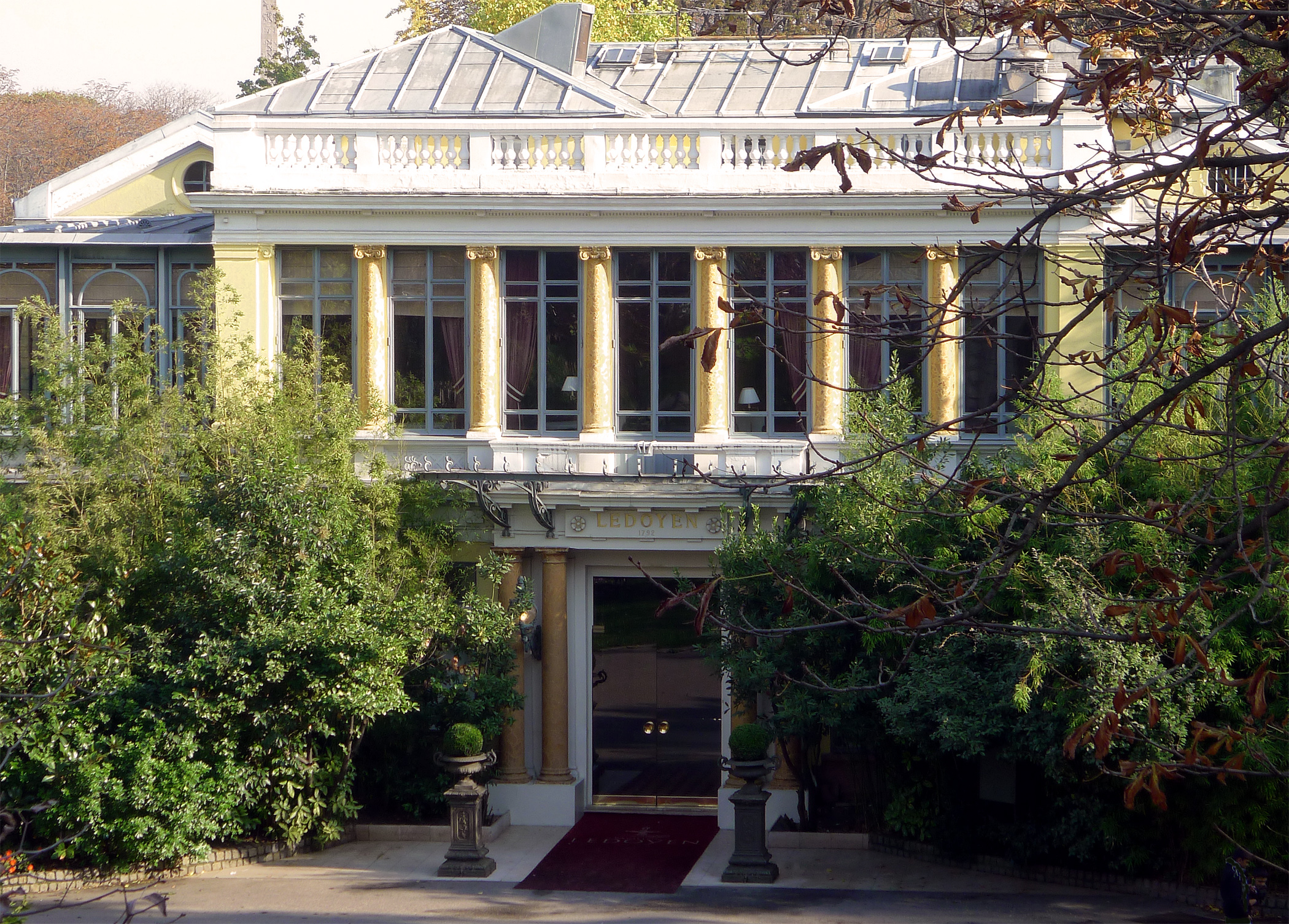
The Pavillon Ledoyen restaurant in Paris which was masked as Septime for the exterior shots of Le Grand Restaurant

Besnard would go on to direct his own movie titled Le Grand Restaurant in 1966, which he co-wrote with Jean Halain and Louis de Funès. It starred de Funès and Bernard Blier as the main characters of the comedy film, and ranked as the eighth-most-popular film at the French box office that year. In 1967 Besnard would go on to direct the comedy film Le Fou du labo 4 starring Jean Lefebvre and Bernard Blier, from which he attainted much acclaim and public popularity. Besnard directed a few Boulevard comedies in the 1970s with varying degrees of success. He most notably worked as assistant director under Gérard Oury in the 1973 comedy Les Aventures de Rabbi Jacob, starring Louis de Funès. However, by the 1980s, Besnard left the silver screen to focus on directing opportunities for television shows and movies.

In 1976 he directed the erotic film Et si tu n'en veux pas (also known as Joëlle et Pauline or Baby Love) with Joëlle Coeur, Gilda Arancio and Alice Arno in the cast.

Jacques Besnard died on 9 November 2013 in Boutigny-Prouais, Eure-et-Loir, France, aged 84. He is the father of French director Éric Besnard.

== Filmography ==
Director & Screenwriter
| Year | Title | Cast | Notes |
|---|---|---|---|
| 1966 | Le Grand Restaurant | starring Louis de Funès and Bernard Blier | |
| 1967 | Estouffade à la Caraïbe | starring Jean Seberg and Serge Gainsbourg | |
| 1967 | Le Fou du labo 4 | starring Jean Lefebvre and Bernard Blier | |
| 1972 | La Belle Affaire | starring Michel Serrault, Rosy Varte and Michel Galabru | |
| 1974 | C'est pas parce qu'on a rien à dire qu'il faut fermer sa gueule | starring Bernard Blier, Michel Serrault and Jean Lefebvre | |
| 1975 | La situation est grave... mais pas désespérée | starring Michel Serrault and Jean Lefebvre | |
| 1976 | Le Jour de gloire | starring Jean Lefebvre, Pierre Tornade and Darry Cowl | |
| 1976 | Et si tu n'en veux pas | starring Joëlle Cœur, Gilda Arancio and Françoise Pascal | distributed under his pseudonym Jacques Treyens |
| 1978 | Général... nous voilà ! | starring Darry Cowl and Roger Dumas | |
| 1982 | Te marre pas... c'est pour rire ! | starring Michel Galabru and Aldo Maccione | |
| 1984 | Allo Béatrice | starring André Dussollier and Nicole Courcel | television series (6 episodes) |
| 1985 | Hôtel de police | starring Corinne Touzet and Olivier Granier | television series (2 episodes) |
| 1988 | La Belle Anglaise | starring Daniel Ceccaldi and Catherine Rich | television series |
| 1990 | Le Retour d'Arsène Lupin | starring François Dunoyer and Sophie Barjac | television series (1 episode) |
| 1992 | Feu Adrien Muset | starring Jean Lefebvre | television film |
| 994 | Avanti | starring Patrick Bouchitey and Farid Chopel | television film |
Assistant director
| Year | Title | Director | Notes |
| 1956 | Honoré de Marseille | Maurice Régamey | |
| 1957 | Comme un cheveu sur la soupe | Maurice Régamey | |
| 1959 | Cigarettes, Whisky et P'tites Pépées | Maurice Régamey | |
| 1959 | Signé Arsène Lupin | Yves Robert | |
| 1960 | À pleines mains | Maurice Régamey | |
| 1960 | La Famille Fenouillard | Alberto Lattuada | Italian film, co-produced by France |
| 1961 | L'imprevisto | Yves Robert | |
| 1962 | Les Mystères de Paris | André Hunebelle | |
| 1962 | Le Masque de fer | Henri Decoin | |
| 1964 | Banco à Bangkok pour OSS 117 | André Hunebelle | |
| 1964 | Fantômas | André Hunebelle | |
| 1965 | Furia à Bahia pour OSS 117 | André Hunebelle | |
| 1965 | Fantômas se déchaîne | André Hunebelle | |
| 1968 | Sous le signe de Monte-Cristo | André Hunebelle | |
| 1971 | La Folie des grandeurs | Gérard Oury | |
| 1973 | Les Aventures de Rabbi Jacob | Gérard Oury | |
| 1974 | The Four Charlots Musketeers | André Hunebelle | |
Writer only
| Year | Title | Director | Notes |
| 1995 | Un si joli bouquet | Jean-Claude Sussfeld | television film |
| 1997 | Un petit grain de folie | Sébastien Grall | television film |
| 2004 | L'Antidote | Vincent de Brus | film |
Actor
| Year | Title | Director | Notes |
| 1955 | Série noire | Pierre Foucaud | |
| 1955 | Du rififi chez les hommes | Jules Dassin | |
| 1955 | Chantage | Guy Lefranc | |
