= Street Without a King =

La rue sans loi
- Theatrical release poster
- Directed by: Marcel Gibaud
- Written by: Albert Dubout; Marcel Gibaud; Jean Halain
- Produced by: Codo Cinéma
- Starring: André Gabriello; Louis de Funès
- Music by: Marcel Landowski
- Distributed by: Filmsonor
- Release date: 1 December 1950 (France)
- Running time: 100 minutes
- Country: France
- Language: French

Street Without a King (French: La rue sans loi), is a French comedy film from 1950, directed by Marcel Gibaud, based on the cartoons by Albert Dubout, and starring André Gabriello as gangster Sparadra and featuring Louis de Funès as a music teacher.

== Cast ==
- Andrée Gabriello: Sparadra
- Paul Demange: Anatole
- Max Dalban: Fifille (Anatole's wife)
- Nathalie Nattier: Emma (the vamp)
- Annette Poivre: countess of the Trill
- Albert Dinan: François (Anatole's colleague)
- Louis de Funès (as De Funès): Hippolyte (the music teacher)
- Jackie Sardou: The nanny (uncredited)
