= The Wing or the Thigh =

- Directed by: Claude Zidi
- Written by: Claude Zidi; Michel Fabre
- Produced by: Christian Fechner
- Starring: Louis de Funès; Coluche; Claude Gensac; Julien Guiomar; Martin Lamotte; Ann Zacharias
- Cinematography: Wladimir Ivanov; Claude Renoir
- Edited by: Robert Isnardon; Monique Isnardon
- Music by: Vladimir Cosma
- Production company: Films Christian Fechner
- Distributed by: AMLF
- Release date: 27 October 1976
- Running time: 104 minutes
- Country: France
- Language: French
- Box office: $43.8 million

The Wing or the Thigh, from the French L'aile ou la cuisse (French pronunciation: [lɛ.lu.la.kɥis]) is a 1976 French comedy film directed by Claude Zidi, starring Louis de Funès and Coluche.

== Plot ==
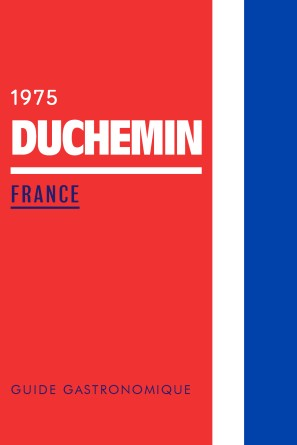
1975 Guide Duchemin

Charles Duchemin (Louis de Funès) is the editor of an internationally known restaurant guide, for which he still personally performs numerous restaurant tests using an assortment of elaborate disguises to escape detection by the restaurant owners. After being appointed to the Académie Française, Duchemin decides to retire as a restaurant critic and trains his son Gérard (Coluche) to continue the family business. However, unbeknownst to Charles, Gérard is more interested in his true passion—working as a clown in a small circus which he has co-founded and supports financially.

Charles Duchemin is informed that Jacques Tricatel (Julien Guiomar), the owner of a company of mass-produced food, is trying to take over a large number of quality restaurants which had been awarded stars by Duchemin. Duchemin fears that customers will be misled into eating low quality food at Tricatel-owned restaurants. A short time later, an operative hired by Tricatel enters Duchemin's offices and tries to steal the almost finished restaurant guide from this year. Duchemin is able to trick the operative into stealing last year's data and, together with Gérard, follows him to watch him hand over the files to Tricatel's assistant Lambert (Daniel Langlet).

Duchemin resolves to fight against Tricatel. First he agrees to appear on a famous talk show hosted by Philippe Bouvard, who had long been trying to get Duchemin on the show, but only under the condition that Tricatel also be invited. He then orders his staff to obtain incriminating information on Tricatel which he plans to use during the talk show confrontation.

Charles begins a lengthy tour of France's restaurants to finish up this year's restaurant guide. Gérard decides to come with him because Charles' new young secretary Marguerite (Ann Zacharias) will also attend and Gérard is smitten by her. During the tour, they are followed by Lambert. Since the circus cannot perform without Gérard, it is decided that the circus will follow the Duchemins' journey and Gérard will slip out of the hotel every night to take part in the performance. During one of the nights Gérard is followed by Lambert, who gives this information to Tricatel. He, in turn, informs Charles who secretly attends the next circus performance. During the performance he confronts Gérard and fires him.

When Charles returns to the hotel-restaurant alone, he himself is confronted by the manager. The manager once was the owner of a highly rated restaurant but Duchemin had taken away the restaurant's stars a few years ago, which led to his bankruptcy. He had to sell his business to Tricatel which now delivers the disgusting food that is served in the restaurant. The manager forces Charles at gunpoint to eat all the leftovers in the kitchen, leading Charles to become ill.

The next day, when recuperating in the hospital, Charles notices that the ordeal has completely taken away his sense of taste. Lambert, who is still shadowing the Duchemins, finds this out and gives the information to Tricatel who plans to humiliate Duchemin by letting him perform a blind tasting during the talk show. He also informs the press of Charles' condition who swarm the hospital. After Charles rehires Gérard, both manage to escape the journalists and lie low in Gérard's circus.

On the day of the talk show Charles and Gérard, with Marguerite's help, infiltrate Tricatel's food factory to obtain incriminating evidence. They find out that all the food is made from artificial ingredients, e.g. petroleum and rubber. They are discovered by company security. When this information is brought to Tricatel, who is already in the TV studio, he demands that both be killed discreetly in the factory. The security forces try to chase the Duchemins into a food processing machine where they would be killed without leaving a trace, but Charles notices the trap and they can trick the security forces into believing they have been killed and flee the factory with some of the artificial food as evidence.

They return to the talk show at the last minute. Charles lets Gérard perform the blind tasting demanded by Tricatel, who does a good job until the last challenge: a red wine. When Charles sees Gérard struggle, he storms the stage and successfully identifies the wine by simply looking at it in the wine glass. Then the Duchemins let Tricatel perform a taste test with the food they obtained from the factory. When Tricatel is totally disgusted by the food they let everyone know that those are Tricatel's own products. Furthermore, Tricatel's demand to kill the Duchemins had inadvertently been filmed and is now shown to the audience. Tricatel is booed from the stage.

The film ends with Gérard handing in his resignation but reconsidering when he finds out that Marguerite will continue to work for the company. The final scene shows the inaugural dinner at the Académie Française where vol-au-vent is served. In his dish Duchemin finds the watch he lost in the food factory.

== Reception ==
=== Box-office ===
The film sold a total of 5,841,956 tickets in France, and was France's number 1 French film at the 1976 box office, and the second-biggest for all origins. It has become a classic and is often broadcast on TV.

=== Critical reception ===
The film received a favourable critical reception.

=== Awards ===
The film received a Goldene Leinwand (Golden Screen) in Germany in 1978.

== Trivia ==
- The Duchemin Guide is likely a reference to the real life Michelin Guide.
- Jacques Tricatel is likely a reference to Jacques Borel, one of the main promoters of industrial food in France at that time.
- This is the first movie of Louis de Funès after his double heart attack of 1974, that kept him from playing in Gérard Oury's Le Crocodile, a film that ended up never being made.
