= Perched on a Tree =

- Directed by: Serge Korber
- Written by: Pierre Roustang; Jean Halain
- Produced by: Raymond Danon
- Starring: Louis de Funès
- Cinematography: Edmond Séchan
- Edited by: Marie-Claire Korber
- Music by: Alain Goraguer
- Distributed by: Société Nouvelle Cinématographique, Impéria Films
- Release date: 14 April 1971
- Running time: 90 minutes
- Country: France
- Language: French

Perched on a Tree (French title: Sur un arbre perché) is a 1971 French comedy film, directed by Serge Korber, written by Pierre Roustang, and starring Louis de Funès.

== Plot ==
Henri Roubier (Louis de Funès), a highway industrialist, is returning from Italy when he picks up, against his will, a hitchhiker (Olivier de Funès) and a young lady (Geraldine Chaplin) whose engine broke down. Against his will, Roubier is forced by the hitchhiker to drop both of them off at Cassis. During the night, Roubier is exhausted by his two talkative passengers, and misses a right turn, and is precipitated in the void after the woman's dog landed on the accelerator.

The next morning, the three of them wake up to find themselves on a tree, perched right on the side of a cliff, near the sea. Roubier seems to have a particularly hard time to calm the woman, who is completely taken by panic attack and whose absurdity leads her into trying to jump out of the car. She eventually calms herself over the course of the day while Roubier whimpers about his fate. At night time, Roubier turns on his portable television and succeeds into accessing the Daily Bulletin Programme, who exaggerates the disappearance of the rich industrialist, to the amusement of his two passengers. After the bulletin, a horror film is shown containing a plot regarding a vampire in which Roubier looks with fright and attention. Terrorised, he shuts the television and remembers the bulletin had also mentioned the disappearance of a "vampire camper". Roubier starts to wonder if the hitchhiker he had picked up was actually a vampire, and suffers from a magnified nightmare.

After a rough night, the three passengers are able to get the attention of a boat with a mirror, but fails after the light the mirror reflected made the engine explode. Hours pass, and the morale of the passengers in the car continues to decline. At one point, the woman undresses her shirt with the intention of tanning, which gives Roubier the idea of taking out all of the clothes available in the car, and tying them together to form a rope, in which the passengers could descend, and attain safer grounds. After the three protagonists get rid of the unnecessary clothes worn, the rope is thrown into the void. Roubier is the first one to itch his way down, but unfortunately, a jeans in the rope starts to tear apart. He climbs up the rope quickly, and narrowly avoids death. The rope falls into the sea, and Roubier cries in despair to this saddening sight, while the two other passengers seem to develop a liking for each other. The same evening, a mild storm quickly develops, to the joy of the thirsty passengers, who haven't drank in two days. However, the accumulating rain forces the occupants to start throwing water out of the car to prevent a surplus of water in the vehicle. It is next morning that Roubier gets the idea to throw a bottle with an SOS inside, attached to a parachute. The bottle eventually lands in a café in Saint-Tropez, where the message is received by a couple, who involuntarily alert the police, who quickly rush to the right turn Roubier had missed, where they find the car intact, amazed at this queer sight. The information is quickly dispersed, and the news seems more of a scandal to the public, however. Over the night, crane-lifters arrive on the scene as the "Operation Pin-Parasol" begins. The rescue operation begins immediately, but quickly goes wrong, after the woman's (whose name is Mrs Muller) husband attempts to destroy the rope sent down to recover the occupants of the car, livid with jealousy at the sight of his wife and the hitchhiker hugging each other. The tree menaces to collapse after the husband's cigar starts consuming the roots, and the car is saved by a helicopter, who had attached the car to a trolley just in time. However, the helicopter doesn't bring the car back on the road, but is taken to a desert Pacific island, by Roubier's highway rivals. As Muller and the hitchhiker embrace, Roubier attempts to throw another message in a bottle into the ocean, which breaks on the rocks. Despaired, Roubier turns away and whimpers at the unexpected turn of events.

== Cast ==
- Louis de Funès: Henri Roubier
- Olivier de Funès: hitchhiker
- Geraldine Chaplin: Mrs Muller
- Alice Sapritch: Lucienne Roubier
- Paul Préboist: radio journalist
- Hans Meyer: Colonel Muller
- Roland Armontel: Father Jean-Marie
- Franco Volpi: Mazzini
- Jean-Jacques Delbo: yacht owner
