= Olivier de Funès =

French actor and airline pilot (born 1949)

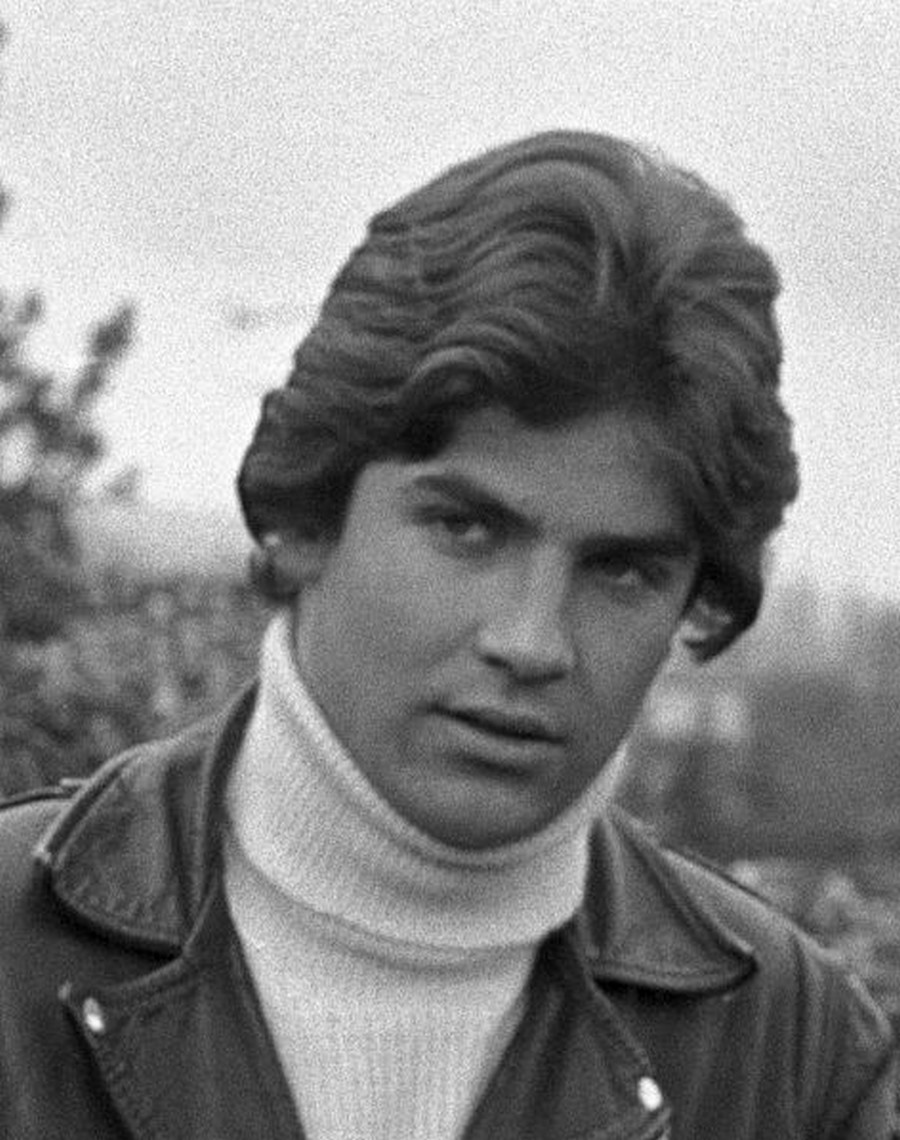
Olivier de Funès in 1970

Olivier de Funès de Galarza (French: [ɔlivje d(ə) fynɛs d(ə) ɡalaʁza]; born 11 August 1949) is a French former film actor, retired Air France pilot, and a son of the most popular actor in French cinema history, Louis de Funès.

== Partial filmography ==
- 1965: Fantômas se déchaîne (directed by André Hunebelle) - Michou
- 1966: Le Grand Restaurant (dir. by Jacques Besnard) - Marmiton Louis (uncredited)
- 1967: Les Grandes Vacances (dir. by Jean Girault) - Gérard Bosquier
- 1969: Hibernatus (dir. by Édouard Molinaro) - Didier de Tartas
- 1970: L'Homme orchestre (dir. by Serge Korber) - Philippe Evans
- 1971: Perched on a Tree (dir. by Serge Korber) - L'auto-stoppeur (final film role)
