= Château de Clermont =

17th-century French château

Coordinates: 47°19′31″N 1°20′2″W

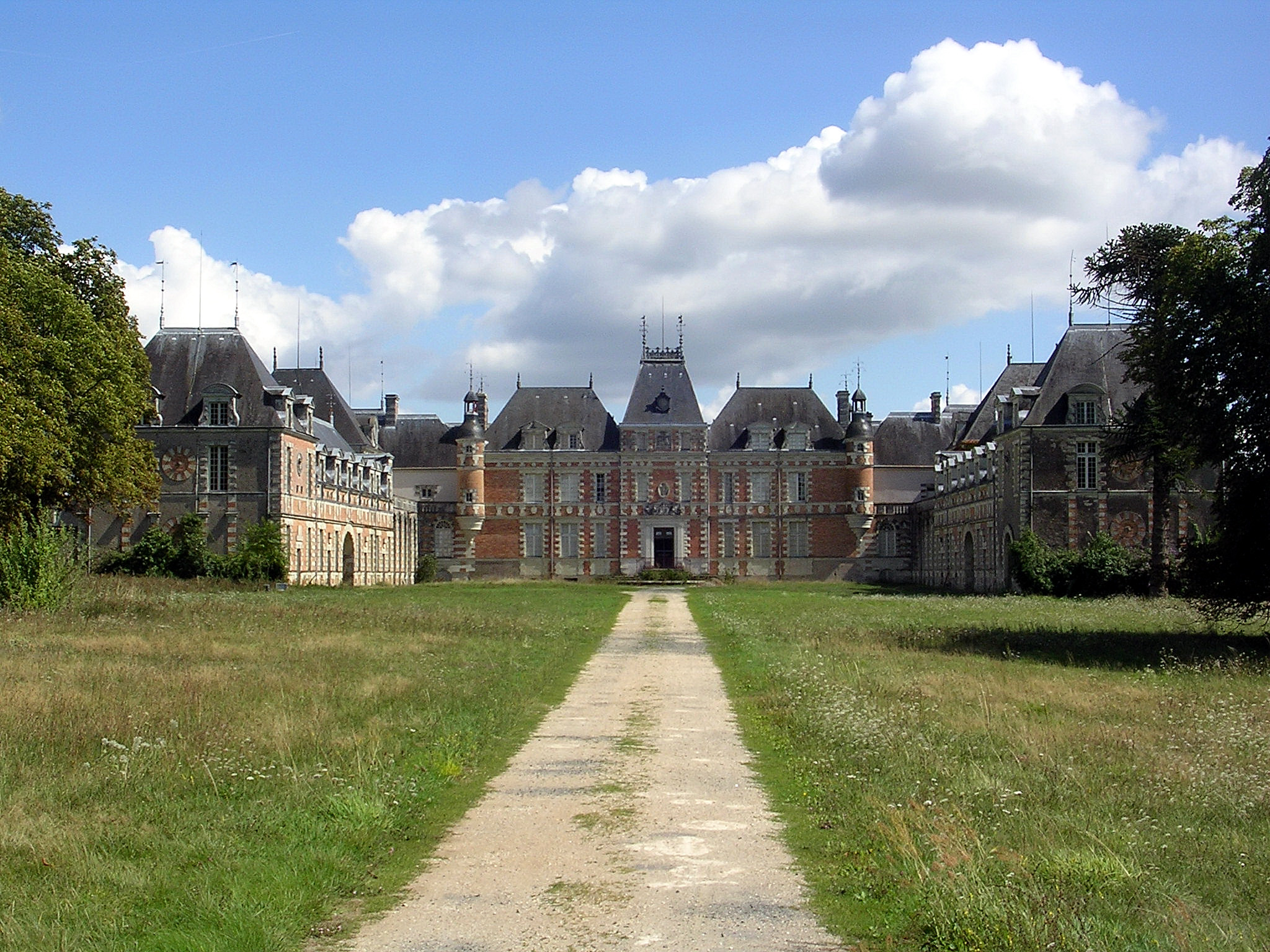
Château de Clermont, northern aspect

The Château de Clermont (French: [ʃɑto d(ə) klɛʁmɔ̃]) is a 17th-century château located in the commune of Le Cellier, approximately 27 kilometres (17 mi) from Nantes, in western France. It was built between 1643 and 1649. The château was owned by the Maupassant family before later becoming the residence of renowned French actor Louis de Funès.

== Appearance and architecture ==
The appearance of the château has remained largely unchanged since its construction during the regency of Anne of Austria in the minority of Louis XIV. Its southern façade, which overlooks the Loire River, offers a panoramic view of the Pays des Mauges and the Pays de Retz. The northern side features a shaded avenue perpendicular to the Paris–Nantes road, framed by the château's original wings. The estate is surrounded by 3 hectares (7.4 acres) of parkland and a 17-hectare (42-acre) vineyard. Actor Louis de Funès had a rose garden planted on the grounds, though it no longer exists.

The Château de Clermont exhibits three major characteristics of the Louis XIII style:

- The use of pink brick and stone masonry, which softens the formal geometry of the structure;
- Distinctive slate roofs, varied in form and unique to several of the main buildings;
- A central section housing the main staircase, which dominates the overall composition of the château.

A grand avenue crosses two moats and leads visitors into the central courtyard, flanked by the château's symmetrical wings.

=== Wings ===
The two wings of the château originally housed the servants' quarters, including sleeping rooms, stables, and greenhouses, all strategically positioned to remain under the supervision of the master of the house. Where the wings connect to the main body of the building, the kitchens are located on the right and the chapel on the left, the latter still featuring its original retable above the altar. From the center of each wing, arched passages lead outward—on the right to the gardens and on the left to the farmyard. These two entrances provide both practical access and visual relief, breaking the otherwise rigid symmetry of the formal layout. A gallery runs along the first floor of the right-hand wing.

The wings of the Château de Clermont differ significantly from those of other châteaux built during the same period in the 17th century. Until around 1624, château wings were typically constructed to match the height of the central structure, enclosing the courtyard on three sides in a style that echoed the defensive layout of medieval castles. The Château du Rocher-Portail, near Fougères, is a rare surviving example of this earlier architectural tradition.

Clermont is one of the last châteaux to feature wings attached directly to the central building. However, its wings are noticeably smaller and lower in height, reflecting an Italian influence—a natural development at a time when many French architects were studying in Rome and Venice. The château was completed just before 1650, shortly before a shift in architectural fashion led to the separation of wings from the central body, a trend exemplified by the construction of Vaux-le-Vicomte and François Mansart’s design of the Château de Beaumesnil.

=== Mixture of styles ===
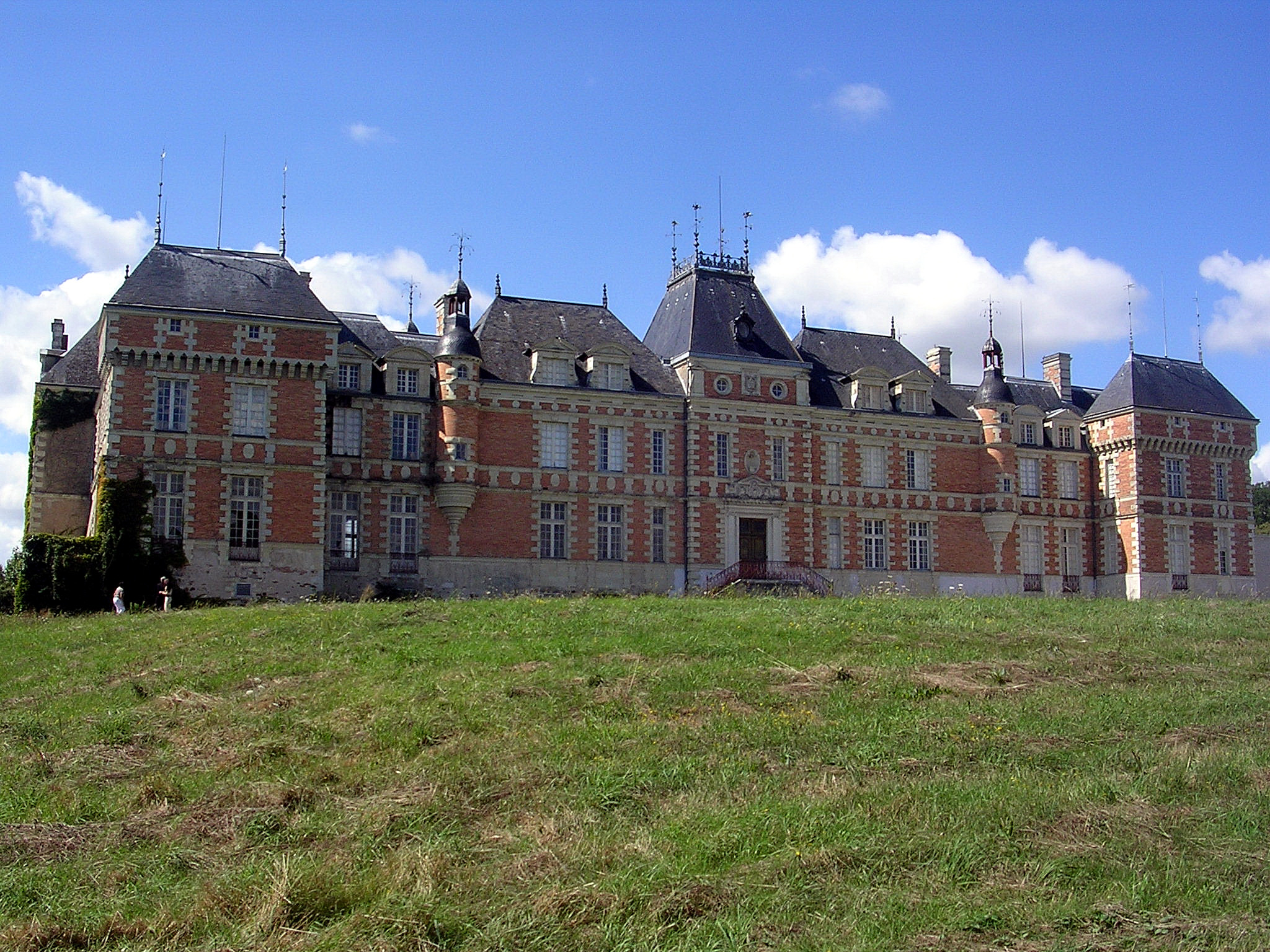
Southern aspect of the château

Although the design of the château was considered highly modern at the time of its construction, it incorporates several features reminiscent of older architectural styles. Corbelling is used on both the northern and southern facades, while on the Loire-facing side, machicolations—traditionally associated with medieval fortifications—are employed to support the high roofs. Despite these historical references, the architectural elements are harmoniously integrated into the overall design.

== History ==
The château was inherited by the de Funès family from an aunt, the Countess of Maupassant. It was originally built by the Chenu de Clermont family, prominent military administrators of their time. René Chenu (1599–1672) served as governor of the fortified towns of Oudon and Champtoceaux, which controlled the Loire River upstream. His son, Hardy Chenu (1621–1683), oversaw the fortifications, cities, castles, and fortified towns throughout Brittany.

The Chenu family were vassals of the House of Condé, which held extensive territories in western France. This feudal bond, strong under the Ancien Régime, was reinforced by a close personal friendship. René Chenu was a contemporary and loyal ally of Henry II de Bourbon, Prince of Condé. The lifespans of Hardy Chenu and Louis II de Bourbon-Condé, the Grand Condé, closely parallel each other, and Hardy served the Grand Condé during his military campaigns. Tradition holds that one of the Chenu—either father or son—saved the life of their lord, and that the Château de Clermont was built in gratitude for this act. Regardless of the precise details, the château’s grand proportions suggest the scale of princely patronage.

The Château de Clermont was constructed shortly after the Battle of Rocroi (19 May 1643), where the Grand Condé secured a decisive victory that helped safeguard the throne of the young Louis XIV. The château reflects the celebratory and triumphant spirit of the period. For 30 years, it was owned by the renowned French comedian Louis de Funès. In 2013, the building was converted into a museum dedicated to his life and career; however, the museum was closed in 2016.

== See also ==
- List of castles in France
