= Hearth Fires =

- Movie Poster "Les Feux de la Chandeleur"
- Directed by: Serge Korber
- Written by: Serge Korber; Catherine Paysan
- Produced by: Gérard Beytout
- Starring: Annie Girardot; Claude Jade; Jean Rochefort; Bernard Le Coq; Bernard Fresson
- Music by: Michel Legrand
- Release date: 24 May 1972
- Running time: 95 mins
- Countries: France; Italy
- Language: French

Hearth Fires (French: Les Feux de la Chandeleur) is a 1972 French film directed by Serge Korber. The film is also known as La Divorziata (Italy).

== Synopsis ==
Marie-Louise (Anne Girardot) is a woman whose love for her ex-husband will not die. The lawyer Alexandre (Jean Rochefort) left her, because she attended a few leftist marches and demonstrations. While her daughter Laura (Claude Jade) falls in love with Marc (Bernard Fresson), Marie-Louise keeps hoping that Alexandre will come back to her. Laura helps her to fight for love and Marie-Louise is so attached to this idea that when her son (Bernard Le Coq) finally convinces her that he will never return, the realization has dire consequences.

Jean Rochefort played his first major role. In this film he played with 41 years a family father of adult children (the young Claude Jade was already 23 and Bernard Fresson who has played Jade's fiancé one year younger than Rochefort). To be older, he had a moustache, since this film his trademark, which he had removed only once (1996 in "Ridicule").

== Cast ==
- Annie Girardot (Marie Louise Boursault)
- Jean Rochefort (Alexandre Boursault)
- Claude Jade (Laura Boursault)
- Bernard Le Coq (Jean-Paul Boursault)
- Bernard Fresson (Marc Champenois)
- Jean Bouise (Father Yves Bouteiller)
- Gabriella Boccardo (Annie)
- Ilaria Occhini (Clotilde)

== Production ==
The film was shot in the Doubs department, including in Pontarlier, Vuillafans, Ornans, and Besançon.

== Awards ==
This movie was nominated for Best Picture at the 1972 Cannes Film Festival.

== Discography ==
The CD soundtrack composed by Michel Legrand is available on Music Box Records label (website).
