= Hibernatus =

- Directed by: Édouard Molinaro
- Written by: Jean Bernard-Luc; Jacques Vilfrid
- Produced by: Alain Poiré
- Starring: Louis de Funès; Claude Gensac; Bernard Alane
- Cinematography: Raymond Lemoigne
- Edited by: Monique Isnardon
- Music by: Georges Delerue
- Distributed by: Gaumont Distribution
- Release date: 1969
- Running time: 82 minutes
- Countries: France; Italy
- Language: French
- Box office: $25.3 million

Hibernatus is a 1969 French-Italian comedy film directed by Édouard Molinaro and written by Jean Bernard-Luc. It stars Louis de Funès as an industrialist named Hubert Barrère de Tartas.

== Plot ==
A man frozen for 65 years is found in the ice of the North Pole by a scientific polar expedition. While he is brought back to life by professor Edouard Lauriebat, the man is identified as Paul Fournier, who was exploring the pole in 1905 and is now, thanks to hibernation, a ninety-year-old young man. Edmée de Tartas, born Fournier, is identified as the granddaughter of Paul and convinces her husband, Hubert Barrère de Tartas, that Paul must be given back to his family, while the government wishes to treat Paul as a research subject. After a kidnapping and a pursuit, the authorities reluctantly agree, but impose, for the sake of Paul's mental health, that his environment be the same as in 1905. As Paul thinks Edmée is his mother, Hubert must play the role of a man courting Edmée and Didier, the son of Edmée and Hubert plays the role of a student living with the family. First under control, the situation gradually deteriorates especially when Paul's actions become a threat to Hubert's plan to marry his son to the daughter of Crepin-Jaujard, one of his business partners.

== Cast ==
- Louis de Funès as Hubert Barrère de Tartas, important industrial
- Claude Gensac as Edmée de Tartas, wife of Hubert
- Bernard Alane as Paul Fournier (« Hibernatus »), grandfather of Edmée
- Olivier de Funès as Didier de Tartas
- Michael Lonsdale as professor Edouard Lauriebat
- Pascal Mazzotti as professor Bibolini, psychiatre
- Martine Kelly as Sophie
- Paul Préboist as Charles
- Annick Alane as Mme Crépin-Jaujard
- Yves Vincent as M. Edouard Crépin-Jaujard
