= Serge Korber =

French film director (1936–2022)

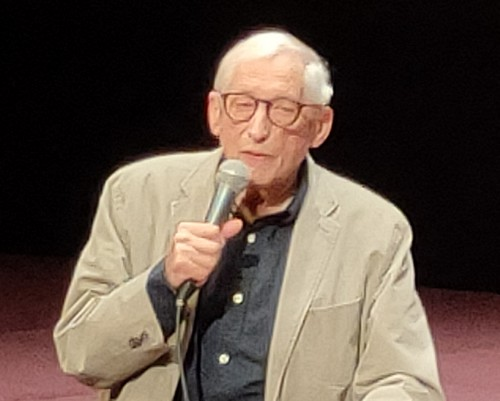
- Born: 1 February 1936; Paris, France
- Died: 23 January 2022 (aged 85); Brens, France
- Occupations: Film director Screenwriter
- Years active: 1962–2007

Serge Korber (1 February 1936 – 23 January 2022) was a French film director and screenwriter. He directed more than 40 films between 1962 and 2007. Successful as the director of comedies starring Louis de Funès in L'homme orchestre and Perched on a Tree (co-starring Geraldine Chaplin), he earned acclaim with his tragical drama Hearth Fires starring Annie Girardot and Claude Jade as mother and daughter. This film was official French film at the 1972 Cannes Film Festival. He died in Brens on 23 January 2022, at the age of 85.

== Selected filmography ==
- An Idiot in Paris (1967)
- A Little Virtuous (1968)
- L'homme orchestre (1970)
- Perched on a Tree (1971)
- Hearth Fires (1972)
