= Le Crocodile (cancelled film) =

- Film poster, published in Le Film français on 11 April 1975, two months after the heart attack of Louis de Funès.
- Le Crocodile
- Directed by: Gérard Oury
- Written by: Gérard Oury; Danièle Thompson; Josy Eisenberg; Jim Moloney
- Produced by: Bertrand Javal
- Starring: Louis de Funès; Peter Sellers (in the 2nd attempt); Régine Crespin; Aldo Maccione; Charles Gérard
- Production company: Films Pomereu
- Country: France
- Languages: French; English (in the 2nd attempt)

Le Crocodile (French pronunciation: [lə kʁokod̪il]) (literally « The Crocodile », in English) was a cancelled film project of the French director Gérard Oury, which would have starred Louis de Funès (in the first attempt of the project) or Peter Sellers (in the second attempt) in the main role.

== Plot ==
Crochet (literally « Hook », in English) is the dictator of a South American (or a South European) country, where the economic meltdown, the deprivation of liberty and the rebellions are part of the daily lot. Suddenly, everybody betrays him: the Americans drop him, the money he hid in Switzerland disappears, and his wife has an affair with the chief of the country's police and wants to make his lover the new leader of the country. To regain his popularity, Crochet organizes false bombings against himself. But he doesn't know that his wife and her lover had prepared real attacks.

== Planned cast ==
- Louis de Funès as Crochet, the dictator (1st attempt)
- Peter Sellers as Crochet, the dictator (2nd attempt)
- Régine Crespin as Crochet's wife, who has an affair with the chief of the country's police
- Aldo Maccione as the chief of the country's police, and the lover of Crochet's wife
- Charles Gérard in an undefined role

== Production ==
Gérard Oury thought of a movie about the dictatorship after the success of his previous movie, The Mad Adventures of Rabbi Jacob, with Louis de Funès.
