= The Big Restaurant =

- Directed by: Jacques Besnard
- Written by: Jean Halain; Louis de Funès; Jacques Besnard
- Produced by: Alain Poiré
- Starring: Louis de Funès; Bernard Blier
- Cinematography: Raymond Lemoigne
- Edited by: Gilbert Natot
- Music by: Jean Marion
- Distributed by: Gaumont Distribution
- Release date: 7 September 1966 (France)
- Running time: 85 minutes (France); 82 minutes (Germany)
- Country: France
- Language: French/German

The Big Restaurant (French: Le grand restaurant) is a French comedy thriller film from 1966, directed by Jacques Besnard, written by Jean Halain and Louis de Funès and starring Louis de Funès and Bernard Blier. The film is known under the titles The Restaurant or The Big Restaurant (international English title), What's Cooking in Paris (US), El gran restaurante (Spain), Das große Restaurant (East Germany), Oscar hat die Hosen voll (West Germany), Grand restaurant pana Septima (Czechoslovakia) and Chi ha rubato il presidente? (Italy).

== Plot ==
Septime runs a top Paris restaurant, fawning to customers (unless they are German) and bullying his staff. Novalès, head of a Latin American country who is on a state visit to France, comes to dinner and is served a speciality of the house, a flambéed dessert. When Septime lights it, it explodes.

Once the smoke has cleared, the president has vanished. The police, led by the commissaire, first think Septime arranged the abduction. When they realise that he is innocent, they wire him up as a decoy, expecting the kidnappers to contact him. They do, telling him to meet them in the French Alps, where the police follow him. Enrique and Sophia, loyal aides of Novalès, also follow Septime to try to recover their boss.

After a chase through snow-covered mountains, Septime decoys the kidnappers into the hands of the police. Free and back in Paris, he is abducted and flown to the Mediterranean coast. In a beautiful garden, he meets Novalès, who arranged his own abduction in order to have a holiday. But he knows he will have to go back to his duties and, returning to Paris, gives Septime the credit for finding him.

Coming with his aides for a last celebratory dinner at Septime's restaurant, they are served the special flambéed dessert. When Septime lights it, it explodes again.

== Cast ==
- Louis de Funès: Monsieur Septime, boss of a big Parisian restaurant
- Bernard Blier: The Inspector
- Toty Rodríguez: Sophia, secretary and mistress of President Novalès
- Venantino Venantini: Enrique, aide of President Novalès
- Noël Roquevert: Minister of the Interior
- Folco Lulli: President Novalès, President of a Latin American country
- Paul Préboist: The cellarman
- Raoul Delfosse: Marcel, head cook
- Max Montavon: The violinist and the customer who declares "Oh, c'est pas cher du tout!"
- Mathias Caccia: The pianist
- Pierre Tornade: Maître d'hôtel
- Maurice Risch: Julien
- Jacques Dynam: Waiter
- Guy Grosso: Waiter
- Michel Modo: Petit-Roger, another waiter
- Eugene Deckers: Accomplice of Novalès
- Paul Faivre: the diner who is dirtied
- Olivier de Funès: kitchen boy Louis (uncredited)

== Reception ==
Le grand restaurant was the eighth-most-popular film at the French box office in 1966.
