= Franco Volpi (actor) =

Italian actor (1921–1997)

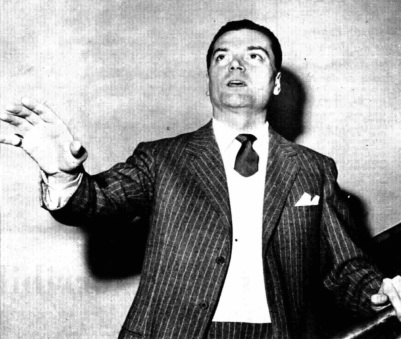
- Franco Volpi in 1960.
- Born: 11 July 1921; Milan, Italy
- Died: 1 January 1997 (aged 75); Rome, Italy
- Occupation: Actor

Franco Volpi (11 July 1921 – 1 January 1997) was an Italian actor and voice actor.

== Biography ==
Born in Milan, Volpi formed at the Accademia dei Filodrammatici and debuted on stage in 1938, aged 17, in the company held by Renzo Ricci and Laura Adani. He often worked with Ernesto Calindri, on stage, on television and in a popular series of commercials. He is regarded as one of the early stars of Italian television miniseries (the so-called "sceneggiati").

Volpi died of a tumour in Rome, on 1 January 1997, at the age of 75.
