= Fantômas se déchaîne =

- French film poster
- Directed by: André Hunebelle; Haroun Tazieff
- Written by: Pierre Souvestre (novels); Marcel Allain (novels); Jean Halain (adaptation); Pierre Foucaud (adaptation)
- Produced by: Paul Cadéac; Alain Poiré
- Starring: Jean Marais; Louis de Funès; Mylène Demongeot
- Cinematography: Raymond Lemoigne
- Edited by: Jean Feyte
- Music by: Michel Magne
- Production company: Gaumont
- Distributed by: Gaumont Distribution
- Release date: 8 December 1965
- Running time: 93 minutes
- Countries: France; Italy
- Language: French
- Box office: $31.6 million

Fantômas se déchaîne (French pronunciation: [fɑ̃tomas sə deʃɛn], "Fantomas Unleashed") is a 1965 film starring Jean Marais as the archvillain Fantômas opposite Louis de Funès as the earnest but outclassed commissaire Juve and the journalist Fandor, also played by Marais. It was France's answer, with the Fantômas trilogy starting in 1964, to the James Bond phenomenon that swept the world at around the same time. It is the second in the trilogy of Fantômas films, that became extremely successful in Europe and Soviet Union and found success even in the United States and Japan. In this film Jean Marais also plays professor Lefebvre.

== Plot ==
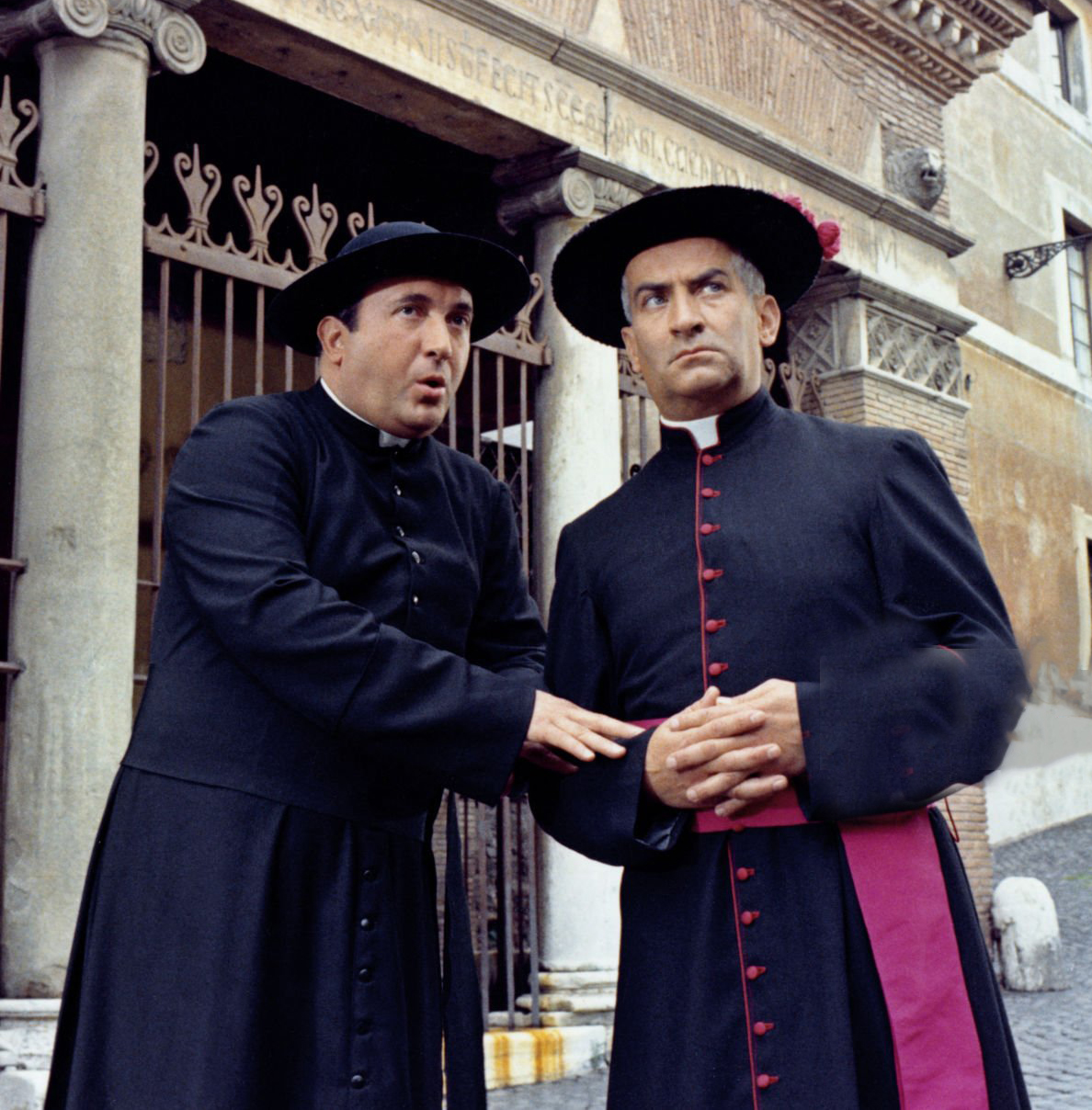
De Funès and Dynam on set in Rome

In the second film of the trilogy Fantômas kidnaps distinguished scientist professor Marchand with the aim to develop a super weapon that will enable him to menace the world. Fantômas is also planning to abduct a second scientist, professor Lefebvre. Journalist Fandor develops an ingenious scheme whereby he disguises himself as Lefebvre and attends a scientific conference in Rome, Italy to lure Fantômas into attempting to kidnap him.

The plan seems to work until commissaire Juve steps into the fray and as usual messes things up, although Juve redeems himself by saving the troupe with an array of special gadgets which he has developed especially for his hunt for Fantômas, but Fantômas escapes using his Citroën DS with retractable wings that converts into an airplane.

== Cast ==
| Actor | Character |
|---|---|
| Jean Marais | Prof. Lefebvre / Fantômas / Fandor |
| Louis de Funès | Commissioner Juve |
| Mylène Demongeot | Hélène Gurn |
| Jacques Dynam | Michel Bertrand |
| Robert Dalban | Newspaper Editor |
| Olivier de Funès | Michou |

== Release ==
Fantômas se déchaîne premiered in France on 8 December 1965. It was the sixth most popular film of 1965 in France, after The Sucker, Goldfinger, Thunderball, Gendarme in New York and Mary Poppins and before God's Thunder and The Wise Guys. It had admissions of 4,412,446.

== The Fantômas trilogy ==
| Title | Release date |
|---|---|
| Fantômas | 4 November 1964 |
| Fantômas se déchaîne | 8 December 1965 |
| Fantômas contre Scotland Yard | 16 March 1967 |
