= Louis de Funès =

French actor and comedian (1914–1983)

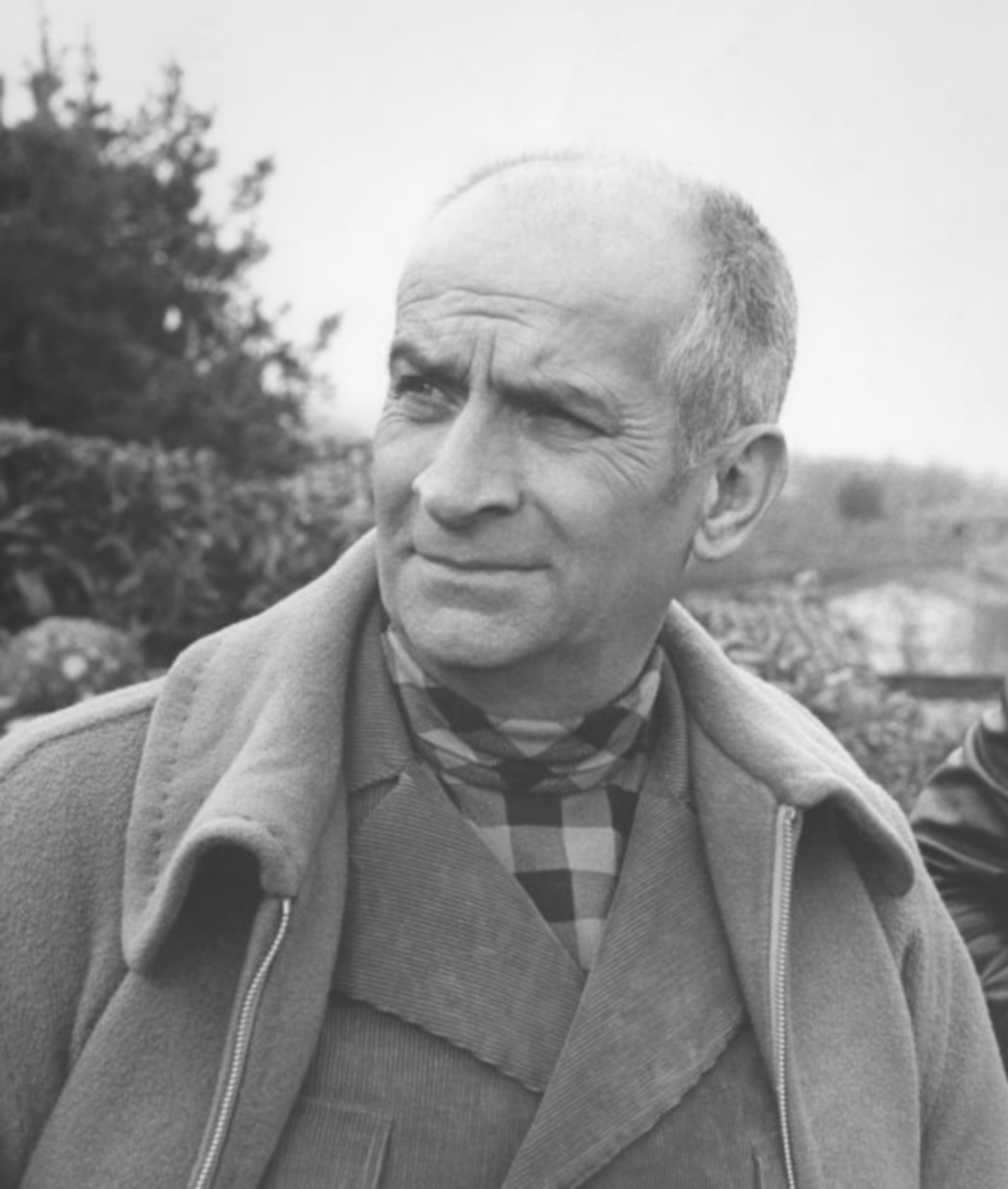
- De Funès in 1970
- Born: Louis Germain David de Funès de Galarza; 31 July 1914; Courbevoie, France
- Died: 27 January 1983 (aged 68); Nantes, France
- Other name: Fufu
- Occupations: Actor; comedian
- Years active: 1945–1982
- Spouses: Germaine Louise Élodie Carroyer (m. 1936; div. 1942) Jeanne Barthelémy de Maupassant (m. 1943)
- Children: 3, including Olivier
- Awards: Grand prix du rire, 1957, Comme un cheveu sur la soupe Victoire du cinéma, 1965; Chevalier de la Légion d'honneur, 1973; César d'honneur, 1980

Signature
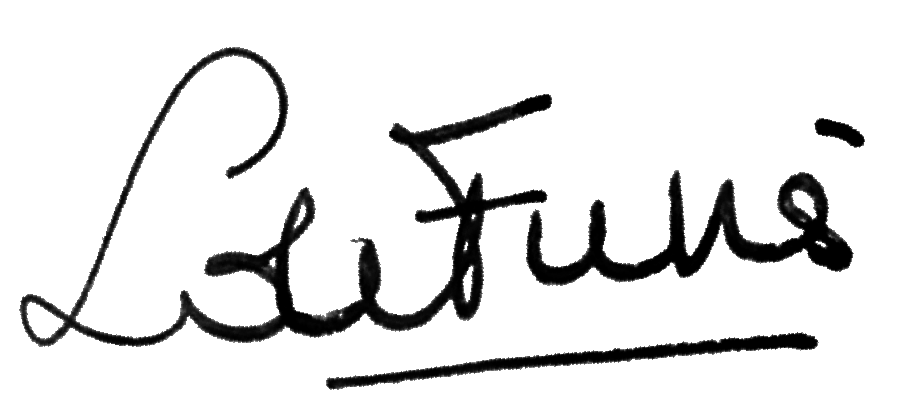

Louis Germain David de Funès de Galarza (French: [lwi d(ə) fynɛs]; (Note: In full: [lwi ʒɛʁmɛ̃ david d(ə) fynɛs d(ə) ɡalaʁza].) 31 July 1914 – 27 January 1983) was a French actor and comedian. His acting style is remembered for its high-energy performance and his wide range of facial expressions and tics. A considerable part of his best-known acting was directed by Jean Girault.

The larger-than-life, conservative petit bourgeois characters he played, who typically kissed up to authority while persecuting their subordinates, particularly resonated with the changing Western societies of the 1960s and drove him to success. However, in his private life, de Funès was a notoriously shy and reserved man, and a devout Catholic.

Louis de Funès remains to this day the most bankable actor in French cinema history. He enjoys widespread international recognition: in addition to his immense fame in the French-speaking world, he remains a household name throughout most of continental Europe including the former Eastern Bloc, the former Soviet Union, as well as Iran, Turkey, and Israel. Despite this international popularity, de Funès remains an obscure figure in the English-speaking world. He was exposed to a wider audience only once in the United States, in 1973, with the release of The Mad Adventures of Rabbi Jacob, which is best remembered for its Rabbi Jacob dance scene and was nominated for a Golden Globe Award.

De Funès has two museums dedicated to his life and acting: one in the Château de Clermont, near Nantes, where he resided, as well as another in the town of Saint-Raphaël, Southern France.

== Early life ==
Louis de Funès was born on 31 July 1914 in Courbevoie. His father, Carlos Luis de Funès de Galarza, was a nobleman whose family was from Funes, and whose mother descended from the Counts de Galarza (of Basque origin). His mother, Leonor Soto Reguera, was Galician, daughter to Galician lawyer Teolindo Soto Barro, of Portuguese descent. The couple met in Seville where, in the conservative environment of Restoration-era Spain, their families opposed their marriage; they eloped to France in 1904. Carlos Luis de Funès had been a lawyer in Spain, but became a diamond cutter upon arriving in France.

Known to friends and intimates as "Fufu", De Funès spoke French, Spanish, and English. During his youth, he was fond of drawing and playing the piano. He was an alumnus of the Lycée Condorcet in Paris. He later dropped out, and his early life was rather inconspicuous; as a youth and young adult, De Funès held menial jobs, from which he was repeatedly fired. He became a bar pianist, working mostly as a jazz pianist in Pigalle, Paris, where he made his customers laugh each time he grimaced. He studied acting for one year at the Simon acting school, where he made some useful contacts, including Daniel Gélin, among others. In 1936, he married Germaine Louise Élodie Carroyer, with whom he had one child: a son named Daniel; the couple divorced in late 1942. Through the early 1940s, De Funès continued playing piano in clubs, thinking there was not much call for a short, balding, skinny actor. His wife and Daniel Gélin encouraged him until he managed to overcome his fear of rejection. His wife supported him in the most difficult moments and helped him to manage his career efficiently.

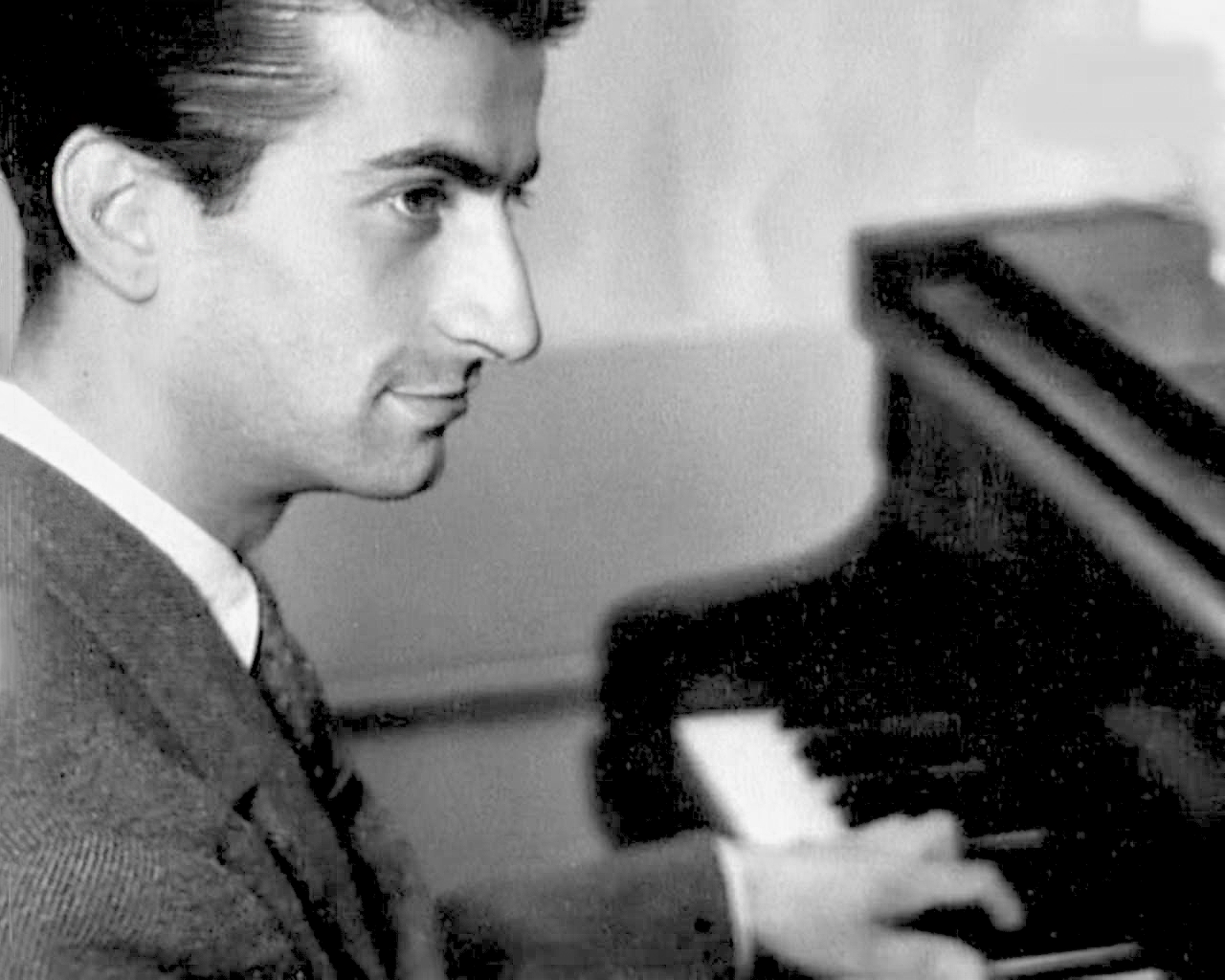
De Funès at the piano in 1943

During the occupation of Paris in the Second World War, he continued his piano studies at a music school, where he fell in love with a secretary, Jeanne Barthelémy de Maupassant. She had fallen in love with "the young man who played jazz like God"; they married in 1943 and remained together for forty years until his death in 1983. They had two sons: Patrick (born on 27 January 1944), who became a doctor, and Olivier (born on 11 August 1949), who became a pilot for Air France Europe and also followed in his father's footsteps by becoming an actor. Olivier de Funès became known for the roles he played in some of his father's films (Les Grandes Vacances, Fantômas se déchaîne, Le Grand Restaurant and Hibernatus being the most famous).

== Theatrical career ==
De Funès began his show business career in the theatre, where he enjoyed moderate success and also played small roles in films. Even after he attained the status of a movie star, he continued to play theatre roles. His stage career culminated in a magnificent performance in the play Oscar, a role which he would reprise a few years later in the film adaptation.

== Film career ==
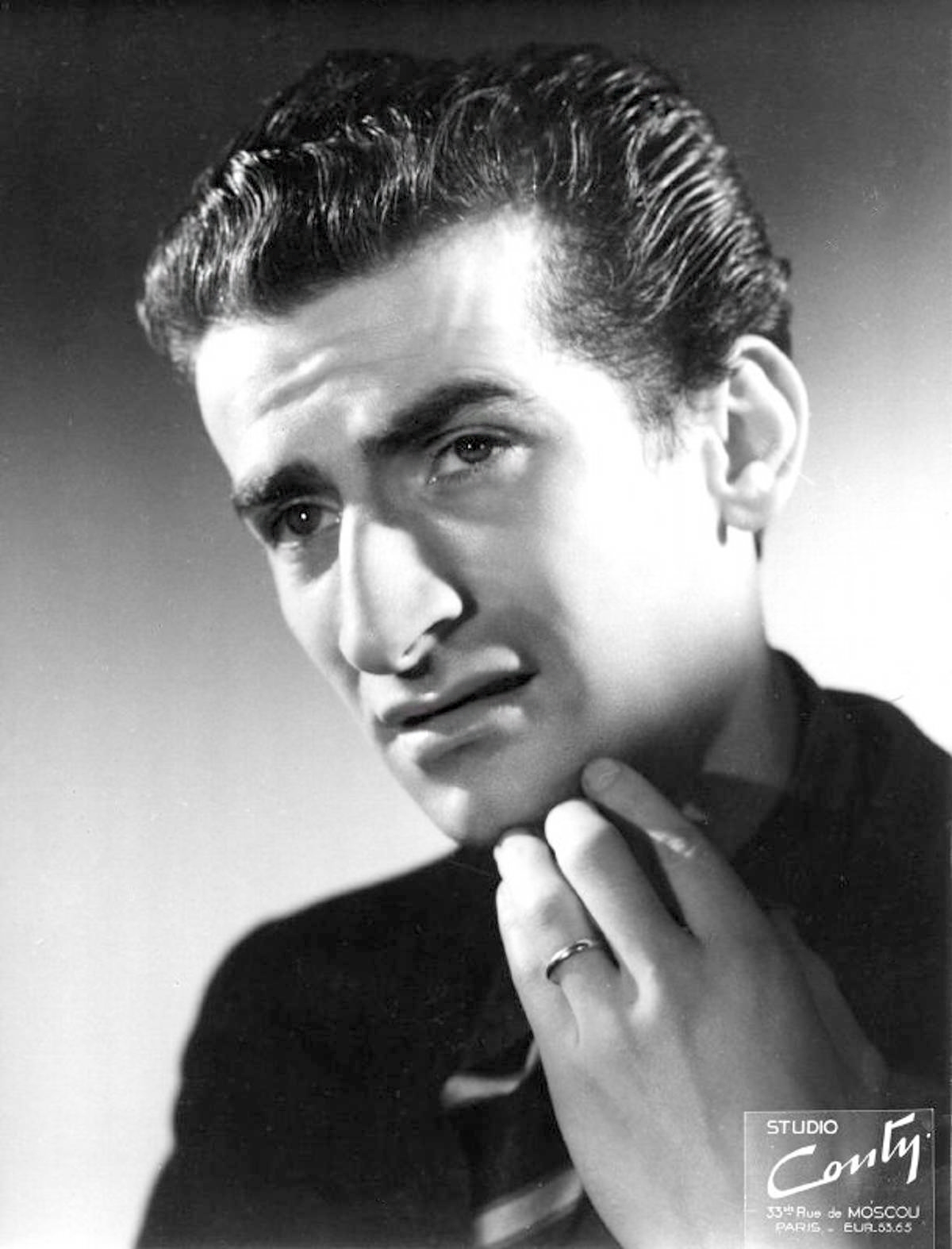
De Funès in 1947

In 1945, thanks to his contact with Daniel Gélin, De Funès made his film debut at the age of 31 with a bit part in Jean Stelli's La Tentation de Barbizon. He appears on screen for less than 40 seconds in the role of the porter of the cabaret Le Paradis, welcoming the character played by Jérôme Chambon in the entrance hall and pointing him to the double doors leading to the main room, saying: "C'est par ici, Monsieur" ("It's this way, Sir"). Chambon declines the invitation, pushing the door himself instead of pulling it open. De Funès then says: "Bien, il a son compte celui-là, aujourd'hui!" ("Well, he had enough, today!").

He went on to perform in 130 film roles over the next 20 years, playing minor roles in over 80 movies before being offered his first leading roles. During this period, De Funès developed a daily routine of professional activities: in the morning, he did dubbing for recognized artists such as Totò, an Italian comic of the time; during the afternoon, he did film work; and in the evening, he performed as a theatre actor.

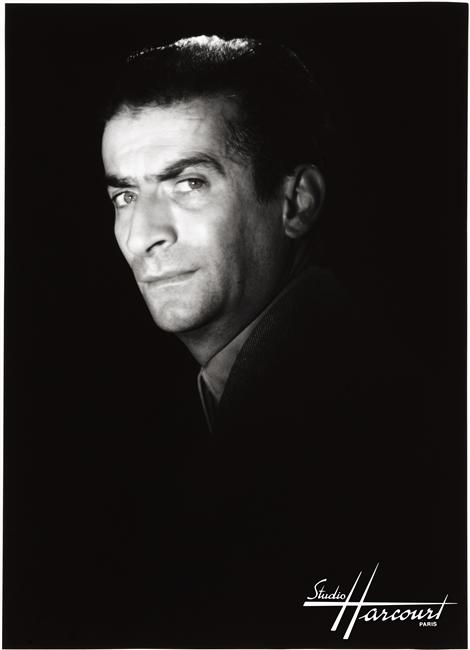
Louis de Funès in 1952

From 1945 to 1955, he appeared in 50 films, usually as an extra or walk-on. In 1954, he went on to star in such films as Ah! Les belles bacchantes and Le Mouton à cinq pattes. A break came in 1956, when he appeared as the black-market pork butcher Jambier (another small role) in Claude Autant-Lara's well-known World War II comedy, La Traversée de Paris. He achieved stardom in 1963 with Jean Girault's film, Pouic-Pouic. This successful film guaranteed De Funès top billing in all of his subsequent films. At the age of 49, De Funès unexpectedly became a major star of international renown with the success of Le gendarme de Saint-Tropez. After their first successful collaboration, director Jean Girault perceived De Funès as the ideal actor to play the part of the scheming, opportunistic and sycophant gendarme; the first film would lead to a series of six.

Another collaboration with director Gérard Oury produced a memorable tandem of De Funès with Bourvil—another great comic actor—in the 1965 film, Le Corniaud. The success of the de Funès-Bourvil partnership was repeated in La Grande Vadrouille, the largest-grossing film ever made in France, drawing an audience of 17.27 million. It remains his greatest success. Oury envisaged a further reunion of the two comics in his film La Folie des grandeurs, but Bourvil's death in 1970 led to the unlikely pairing of De Funès with Yves Montand in that film. Notwithstanding, the film was a success.

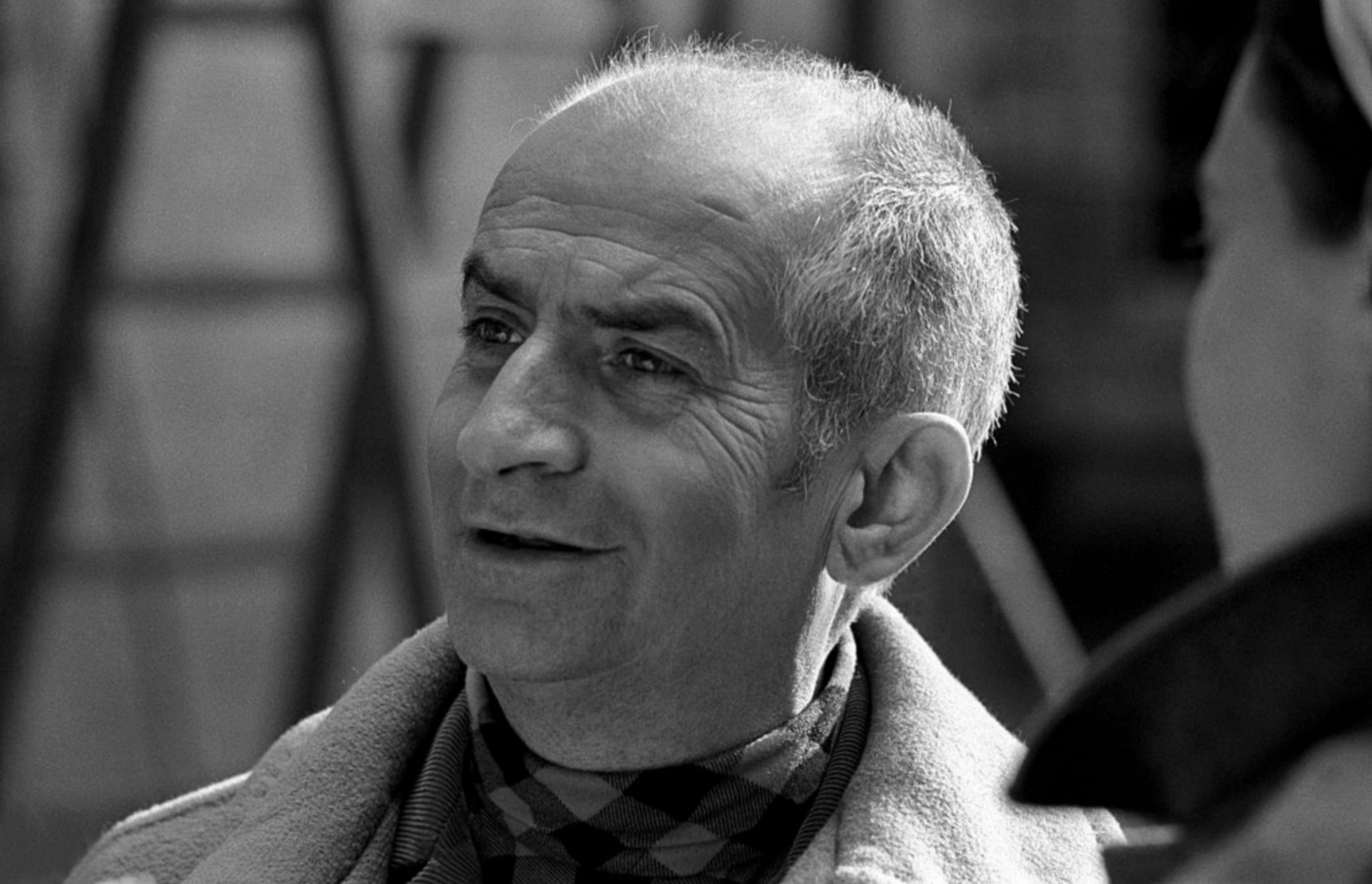
De Funès on the set of L'homme orchestre in 1970

Eventually, De Funès became France's leading comic actor. Between 1964 and 1979, he topped the French box office of the year's most successful movies seven times. In 1968, all three of his films were in the top ten in France for the year, topped by Le Petit Baigneur, with its memorable mass scene.

He co-starred with many of the major French actors of his time, including Jean Marais and Mylène Demongeot in the Fantômas trilogy, and also Jean Gabin, Fernandel, Coluche, Annie Girardot, and Yves Montand. He also worked with Jean Girault in the famous Gendarmes series. In a departure from the gendarme image, De Funès collaborated with Claude Zidi, who wrote for him a new character full of nuances and frankness in L'aile ou la cuisse (1976), which is arguably one of the best of his roles. Later, De Funès' considerable musical abilities were showcased in films such as Le Corniaud and Le Grand Restaurant. In 1964, he debuted in the first of the Fantômas series, which launched him into superstardom.

In 1975, Oury turned again to De Funès for a film entitled Le Crocodile, in which he was to play the role of a South American dictator. But in March 1975, De Funès was hospitalized for heart problems and forced to take a break from acting, causing Le Crocodile to be cancelled. After his recovery, he appeared opposite another comic of the time, Coluche, in L'Aile ou la cuisse. In 1980, De Funès realised a long-standing dream of making a film version of Molière's play The Miser (L'Avare).

De Funès made his final film, Le Gendarme et les Gendarmettes, in 1982.

== Style ==
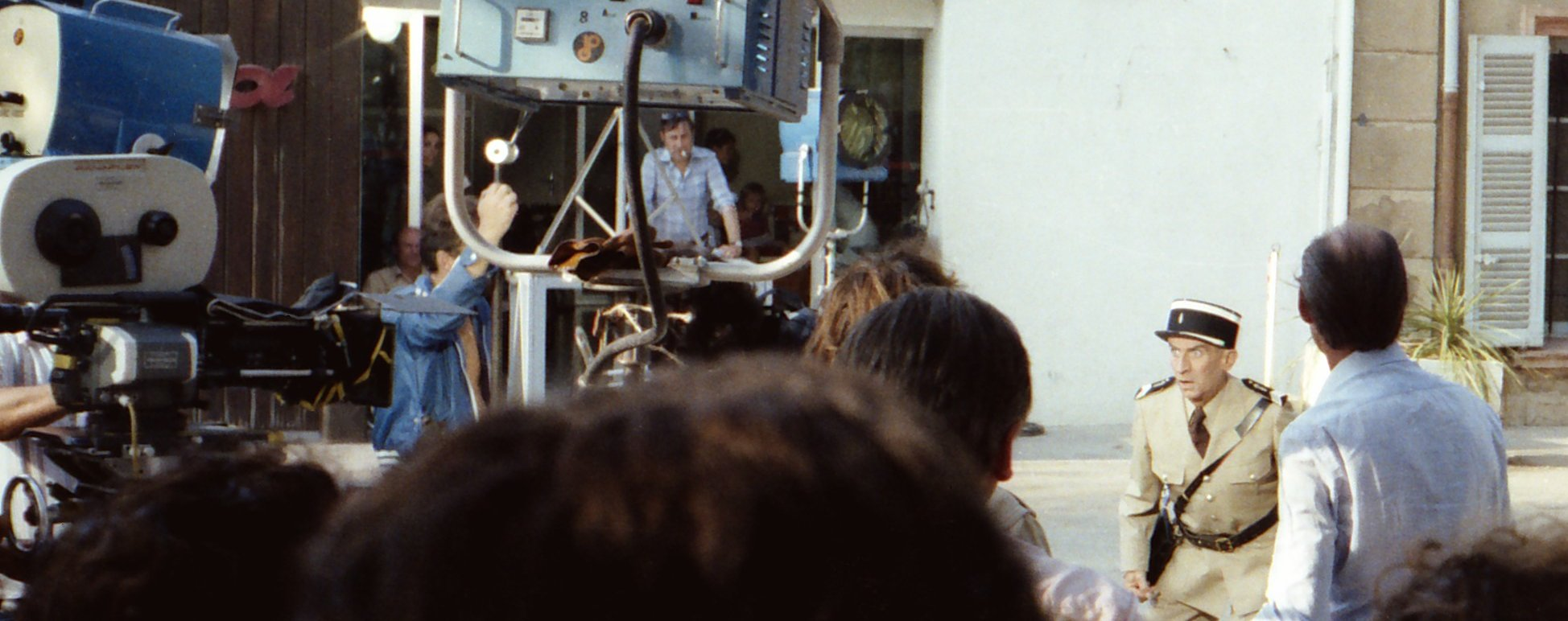
De Funès during the shooting of Le gendarme et les extra-terrestres

Unlike the characters he played, De Funès was said to be a very shy person in real life. Capable of an extremely rich and rapidly changing range of facial expressions, he was nicknamed "the man with forty faces per minute." In many of his films, he played the role of a humorously excitable, cranky, middle-aged or mature man with a propensity for hyperactivity, bad faith, and uncontrolled fits of anger. Along with his short height – 1.64 m (5 ft 4 1/2 in) – and his facial contortions, this hyperactivity produced a highly comic effect. This was particularly visible when he was paired with Bourvil, who was always given roles of calm, slightly naive, good-humoured men. In De Funès' successful lead role in a cinematic version of Molière's The Miser, these characteristics are greatly muted, percolating just beneath the surface.

== Later years and death ==
In the later part of his life, De Funès achieved great prosperity and success. He became a knight of France's Légion d'honneur in 1973. He resided in the Château de Clermont, a 17th-century château located in the commune of Le Cellier, 27 kilometers (17 mi) from Nantes in the west of France. The château, overlooking the river Loire, was partly inherited by his wife, whose aunt had married the castle owner. De Funès was an aficionado of roses and planted a rose garden on the château grounds; a variety of rose was named after him: the Louis de Funès rose. A monument honoring him was erected in the château rose garden.

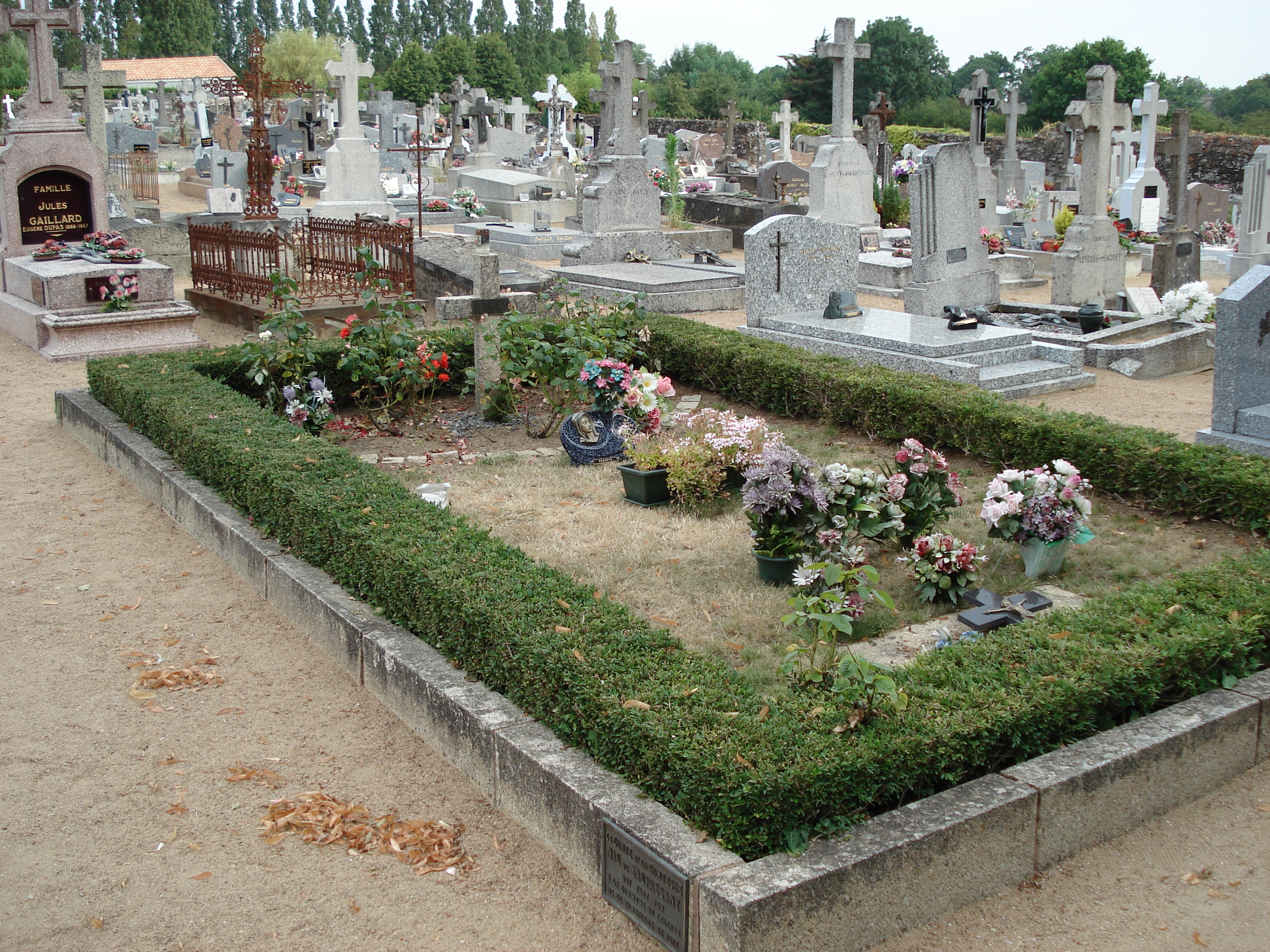
The tomb of Louis de Funès in Le Cellier, France

In his later years, De Funès suffered from a heart condition after having two heart attacks caused by the excessive strain of his stage antics. He died of a third heart attack on 27 January 1983, a few months after making his final film. Although the funeral was planned as a 'private affair', over 3'000 people attended the memorial service on January 29, 1983, in the packed Saint-Martin church in Le Cellier, a town with a relatively small population. He was laid to rest in the Cimetière du Cellier, the cemetery situated on the Château de Clermont grounds.

== Legacy ==
De Funès was portrayed on a postage stamp issued on 3 October 1998 by the French postal service. He was also portrayed in French comics, including as a gambler in Lucky Luke ("The One-Armed Bandit") and as a film studio worker in Clifton ("Dernière Séance"). In 2013, a museum dedicated to De Funès was created in the Château de Clermont where he had resided. In 2019, another De Funès museum opened in Saint-Raphaël, Var.

The behavior, diminutive size, and body language of the character Skinner from the 2007 Pixar animated film Ratatouille are loosely based on Louis de Funès.

== De Funès family ==
Carlos and Leonor had three children in France: Maria (1907–1993), Charles (1908–1940) and, in 1914, Louis de Funès. The family's later prominence rests chiefly on Louis's descendants, who split into two branches through his two marriages: a discreet branch descended from his first marriage, in 1936, to Germaine Carroyer, and a more publicly visible branch descended from his second marriage, in 1943, to Jeanne Barthélemy, known as Nau de Maupassant. Jeanne was the niece of Count Charles Nau de Maupassant (who was not related to the writer Guy de Maupassant) and co-heiress of the Château de Clermont in Le Cellier; the couple bought out the other heir at auction in 1967, and the château was Louis de Funès's home until his death.

In recent years, members of the two branches have spoken publicly, in press interviews, about family tensions and a disputed inheritance dating back to the 1980s, with Louis's grandson Laurent de Funès (from the first marriage) describing efforts by his step-grandmother to keep the two branches apart.

=== Family tree ===
- Carlos Luis de Funès de Galarza (1871–1934), of Almodóvar del Campo; lawyer, later diamond cutter; eloped to France in 1904 with Leonor Soto Reguera (1878–1957), of Ortigueira
  - Maria Teolinda Leonore Margarita de Funès de Galarza (1907–1993), known as "Mine"; actress, credited as "Mimi Funès" in Liliom (1934), directed by Fritz Lang; m. 1952 the film director François Gir, who raised her two children, Charles and Isabelle
    - Isabelle Girard, known as Isabelle de Funès (born 1944), actress, singer, model and photographer; m. the actor Michel Duchaussoy (1970–1971); one daughter, Lisa
  - Carlos Théolindo Javier de Funès de Galarza, known as Charles de Funès (1908–1940), furrier, then soldier, 152nd Infantry Regiment; killed in action at Sault-lès-Rethel, Ardennes, on 20 May 1940 ("Mort pour la France"), and buried in the national necropolis at Rethel; companion Marguerite Metzger (1913–1984)
    - Édouard "Eddy" de Funès, Charles's son
  - Louis Germain David de Funès de Galarza, known as Louis de Funès (31 July 1914, Courbevoie – 27 January 1983, Nantes), actor and comedian; m. (1) 1936 Germaine Louise Élodie Carroyer, divorced 1942; m. (2) 1943 Jeanne Augustine Barthélemy, known as Nau de Maupassant (1914–2015), co-heiress of the Château de Clermont
    - (1) Daniel Charles Louis de Funès de Galarza (1937 – 23 January 2017), graphic designer
      - Laurent de Funès de Galarza, known as Laurent de Funès, advertising professional turned stage performer and author
      - Thierry de Funès de Galarza (deceased)
    - (2) Patrick de Funès de Galarza, known as Patrick de Funès (b. 27 January 1944), physician, radiologist and memoirist
    - (2) Olivier de Funès de Galarza, known as Olivier de Funès (b. 11 August 1949, Paris), actor and, later, Air France pilot; m. 1977 Dominique Watrin
      - Julia de Funès de Galarza, known as Julia de Funès (born 1979), philosopher and essayist; m. 2001 Thomas Coudry
      - Adrien de Funès de Galarza (born 1996), twin
      - Charles de Funès de Galarza (born 1996), twin

Gallery of Louis de Funès's relatives
Teolindo Soto y Barro and his wife Leonor Reguera

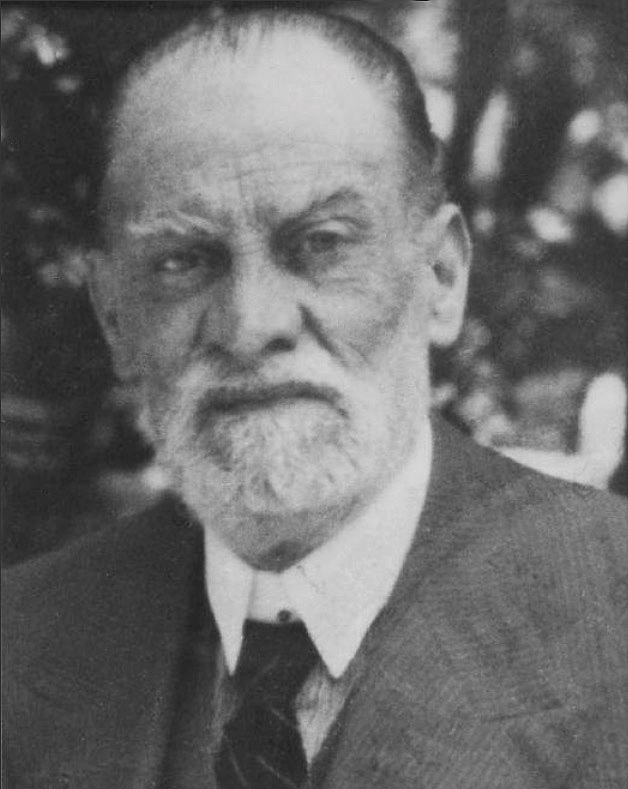
Carlos Luis de Funes de Galarza

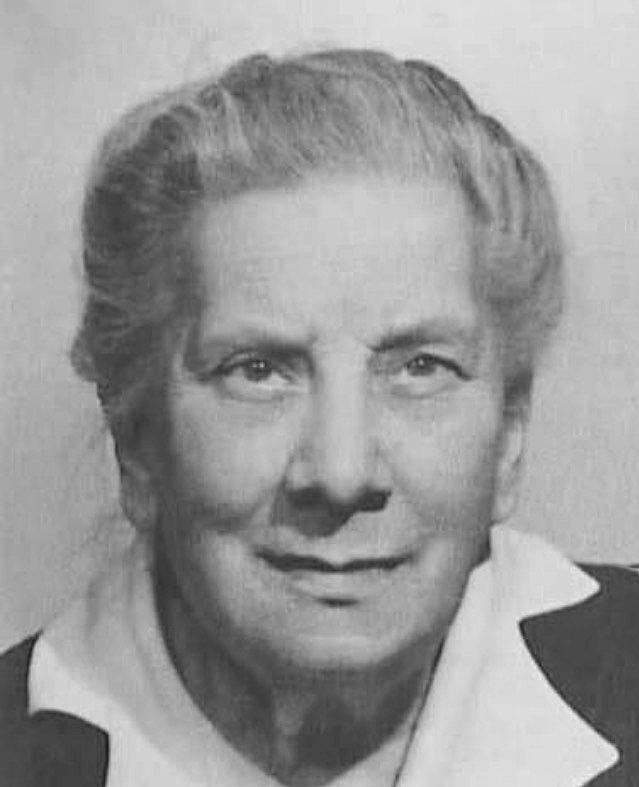
Leonor Soto Reguera

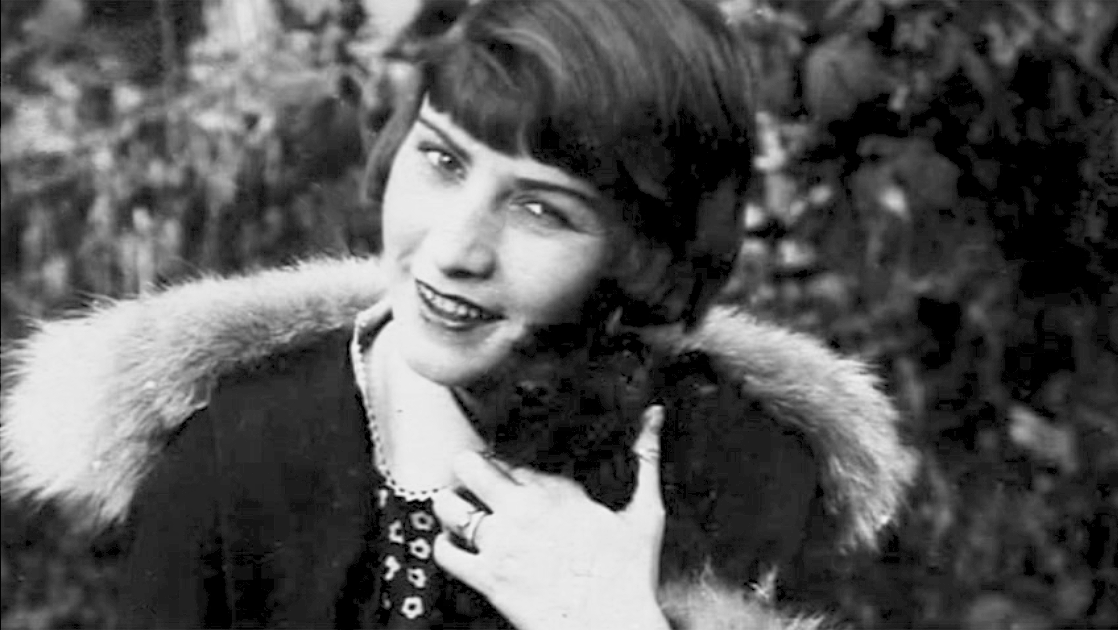
Maria de Funès in 1930

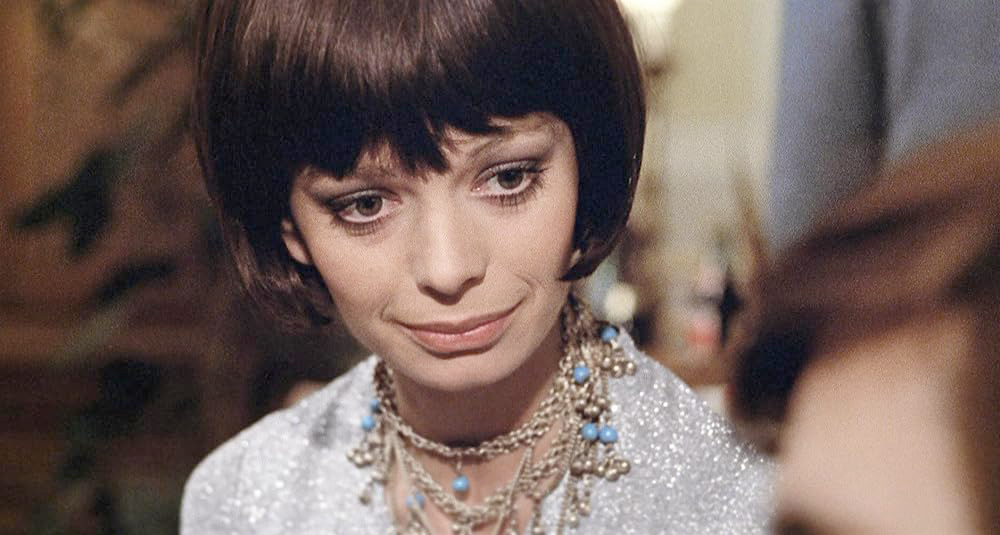
Isabelle de Funès in 1973

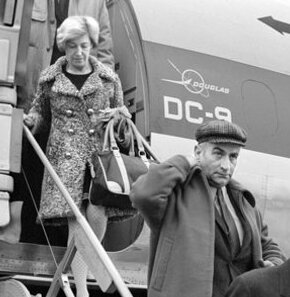
Louis de Funès and Jeanne Barthélemy in 1968

Olivier de Funès in 1970

Julia de Funès in 2018
