= List of highest-grossing films in France =

The following is a list of the films with the most cinema admissions in France, as of 7 October 2026.

Background colour indicates films currently in cinemas

| Rank | Title | Tickets sold | Year |
|---|---|---|---|
| 1 | Titanic | 22,295,045 | 1998 |
| 2 | Bienvenue chez les Ch'tis | 20,489,303 | 2008 |
| 3 | The Intouchables | 19,490,688 | 2011 |
| 4 | Snow White and the Seven Dwarfs | 18,290,843 | 1938 |
| 5 | La Grande Vadrouille | 17,317,745 | 1966 |
| 6 | Gone with the Wind | 16,719,236 | 1950 |
| 7 | Avatar | 15,340,969 | 2009 |
| 8 | Asterix & Obelix: Mission Cleopatra | 14,967,407 | 2002 |
| 9 | Once Upon a Time in the West | 14,862,764 | 1969 |
| 10 | The Jungle Book | 14,695,741 | 1967 |
| 11 | One Hundred and One Dalmatians | 14,660,594 | 1961 |
| 12 | The Ten Commandments | 14,229,745 | 1956 |
| 13 | Avatar: The Way of Water | 14 058 430 | 2022 |
| 14 | Ben-Hur | 13,826,124 | 1960 |
| 15 | Les Visiteurs | 13,782,991 | 1993 |
| 16 | The Bridge on the River Kwai | 13,481,750 | 1957 |
| 17 | Cinderella | 13,226,772 | 1950 |
| 18 | Le Petit Monde de Don Camillo | 12,791,168 | 1952 |
| 19 | La Grande Illusion | 12,500,000 | 1937 |
| 20 | The Aristocats | 12,481,726 | 1971 |
| 21 | Qu'est-ce qu'on a fait au Bon Dieu ? | 12,366,033 | 2014 |
| 22 | The Longest Day | 11,933,629 | 1962 |
| 23 | Le Corniaud | 11,739,783 | 1965 |
| 24 | Lady and the Tramp | 11,175,716 | 1955 |
| 25 | A Little Something Extra | 10,830,209 | 2024 |
| 26 | The Lion King | 10,718,727 | 1994 |
| 27 | Bambi | 10,679,571 | 1948 |
| 28 | Star Wars: Episode VII - The Force Awakens | 10,507,561 | 2015 |
| 29 | Les Bronzés 3 : Amis pour la vie | 10,355,930 | 2006 |
| 30 | Taxi 2 | 10,345,901 | 2000 |
| 31 | Three Men and a Cradle | 10,251,465 | 1985 |
| 32 | The Guns of Navarone | 10,197,729 | 1961 |
| 33 | The Lion King | 10,017,955 | 2019 |
| 34 | Les Misérables | 9,940,533 | 1957 |
| 35 | War of the Buttons | 9,936,391 | 1962 |
| 36 | Doctor Zhivago | 9,816,054 | 1966 |
| 37 | Harry Potter and the Philosopher's Stone | 9 619 363 | 2001 |
| 38 | 20,000 Leagues Under the Sea | 9,619,259 | 1955 |
| 39 | Finding Nemo | 9,528,033 | 2003 |
| 40 | The Greatest Show on Earth | 9,488,114 | 1952 |
| 41 | E.T. the Extra-Terrestrial | 9,415,886 | 1982 |
| 42 | The Count of Monte Cristo | 9 382 216 | 2024 |
| 43 | Le Dîner de Cons | 9,247,001 | 1998 |
| 44 | The Big Blue | 9,194,343 | 1988 |
| 45 | Harry Potter and the Chamber of Secrets | 9,144,701 | 2002 |
| 46 | The Bear | 9,136,266 | 1988 |
| 47 | Asterix & Obelix Take On Caesar | 8,948,624 | 1999 |
| 48 | Emmanuelle | 8,893,996 | 1974 |
| 49 | Avatar: Fire and Ash | 8 844 820 | 2025 |
| 50 | La Vache et le Prisonnier | 8,844,199 | 1959 |
| 51 | The Great Escape | 8,756,631 | 1963 |
| 52 | West Side Story | 8,719,610 | 1962 |
| 53 | The Chorus | 8,689,891 | 2004 |
| 54 | Zootopia 2 | 8 684 945 | 2025 |
| 55 | Amélie | 8,670,926 | 2001 |
| 56 | Le Bataillon du ciel | 8,649,691 | 1947 |
| 57 | Spider-Man: Brand New Day | 8,457,785 | 2026 |
| 58 | Inside Out 2 | 8,427,652 | 2024 |
| 59 | For Whom the Bell Tolls | 8,274,596 | 1947 |
| 60 | The Great Dictator | 8,269,894 | 1945 |
| 61 | Nothing to Declare | 8,150,825 | 2011 |
| 62 | Violettes impériales | 8,125,766 | 1952 |
| 63 | Moana 2 | 8,081,044 | 2024 |
| 64 | The Odyssey | 8,059,232 | 2026 |
| 65 | The Visitors II: The Corridors of Time | 8,043,129 | 1998 |
| 66 | Star Wars: Episode I – The Phantom Menace | 7,975,313 | 1999 |
| 67 | Un indien dans la ville | 7,870,802 | 1994 |
| 68 | Tarzan | 7,859,751 | 1999 |
| 69 | Ratatouille | 7,845,210 | 2007 |
| 70 | Pinocchio | 7,835,702 | 1946 |
| 71 | La Vérité si je mens ! 2 | 7,826,393 | 2001 |
| 72 | Le Gendarme de Saint-Tropez | 7,809,334 | 1964 |
| 73 | Ice Age: Dawn of the Dinosaurs | 7,803,757 | 2009 |
| 74 | The Sixth Sense | 7,799,130 | 2000 |
| 75 | The Count of Monte Cristo | 7,780,642 | 1955 |
| 76 | Harry Potter and the Goblet of Fire | 7,731,601 | 2005 |
| 77 | The Fifth Element | 7,727,697 | 1997 |
| 79 | A Clockwork Orange | 7,602,396 | 1971 |
| 80 | Les Bidasses en folie | 7,460,911 | 1971 |
| 81 | La Famille Bélier | 7,450,944 | 2014 |
| 82 | Le Retour de don Camillo | 7,425,550 | 1953 |
| 82 | Frozen 2 | 7,401,300 | 2019 |
| 83 | Star Wars: Episode III – Revenge of the Sith | 7 396 877 | 2005 |
| 84 | The Lord of the Rings: The Return of the King | 7,393,904 | 2003 |
| 85 | Spider-Man: No Way Home | 7,387,844 | 2021 |
| 86 | The Super Mario Bros. Movie | 7,359,395 | 2023 |
| 87 | The Mad Adventures of Rabbi Jacob | 7,295,727 | 1973 |
| 88 | Aladdin | 7,280,423 | 1993 |
| 89 | Dances with Wolves | 7,280,124 | 1991 |
| 90 | Peter Pan | 7,255,475 | 1953 |
| 91 | Jean de Florette | 7,223,657 | 1986 |
| 92 | The Rescuers | 7,219,476 | 1977 |
| 93 | Shrek 2 | 7,185,626 | 2004 |
| 94 | Avengers: Endgame | 7,139,248 | 2019 |
| 95 | Harry Potter and the Prisoner of Azkaban | 7,138,548 | 2004 |
| 96 | Samson and Delilah | 7,116,442 | 1951 |
| 97 | Joan of Arc | 7,092,586 | 1949 |
| 98 | La Chèvre | 7,079,674 | 1981 |
| 99 | Star Wars: Episode VIII - The Last Jedi | 7,076,549 | 2017 |
| 100 | The Lord of the Rings: The Two Towers | 7,070,194 | 2002 |

== French productions ==
The following are the 100 French films with the most admissions in France as of 31 July 2020.

Background colour indicates films currently in cinemas

| Rank | Title | Tickets sold | Year |
|---|---|---|---|
| 1 | Bienvenue chez les Ch'tis | 20,489,303 | 2008 |
| 2 | The Intouchables | 19,490,688 | 2011 |
| 3 | La Grande Vadrouille | 17,267,607 | 1966 |
| 4 | Asterix & Obelix: Mission Cleopatra | 14,559,509 | 2002 |
| 5 | Les Visiteurs | 13,782,991 | 1993 |
| 6 | Le Petit Monde de Don Camillo | 12,791,168 | 1952 |
| 7 | Qu'est-ce qu'on a fait au Bon Dieu ? | 12,366,033 | 2014 |
| 8 | Le Corniaud | 11,739,783 | 1965 |
| 9 | Les Bronzés 3 : Amis pour la vie | 10,355,928 | 2006 |
| 10 | Taxi 2 | 10,345,901 | 2000 |
| 11 | Three Men and a Cradle | 10,251,465 | 1985 |
| 12 | Les Misérables | 9,940,533 | 1957 |
| 13 | War of the Buttons | 9,936,391 | 1962 |
| 14 | Le Dîner de Cons | 9,247,001 | 1998 |
| 15 | The Big Blue | 9,194,343 | 1988 |
| 16 | The Bear | 9,136,266 | 1988 |
| 17 | Asterix & Obelix Take On Caesar | 8,948,624 | 1999 |
| 18 | Emmanuelle | 8,893,996 | 1974 |
| 19 | La Vache et le Prisonnier | 8,844,199 | 1959 |
| 20 | Le Bataillon du ciel | 8,649,691 | 1947 |
| 21 | Amélie | 8,636,041 | 2001 |
| 22 | The Chorus | 8,636,016 | 2004 |
| 23 | Nothing to Declare | 8,150,825 | 2011 |
| 24 | Violettes impériales | 8,125,766 | 1952 |
| 25 | The Visitors II: The Corridors of Time | 8,043,129 | 1998 |
| 26 | Un indien dans la ville | 7,870,802 | 1994 |
| 27 | La Vérité si je mens ! 2 | 7,826,393 | 2001 |
| 28 | Le Gendarme de Saint-Tropez | 7,809,334 | 1964 |
| 29 | The Count of Monte Cristo | 7,780,642 | 1955 |
| 30 | The Fifth Element | 7,727,697 | 1997 |
| 31 | Les Bidasses en folie | 7,460,911 | 1971 |
| 32 | La Famille Bélier | 7,450,944 | 2014 |
| 33 | Le Retour de don Camillo | 7,425,550 | 1953 |
| 34 | The Mad Adventures of Rabbi Jacob | 7,295,727 | 1973 |
| 35 | Jean de Florette | 7,223,657 | 1986 |
| 36 | La Chèvre | 7,079,674 | 1981 |
| 37 | Monsieur Vincent | 7,055,290 | 1947 |
| 38 | Jour de fête | 7,027,487 | 1949 |
| 39 | Les grandes vacances | 6,986,917 | 1967 |
| 40 | Royal Affairs in Versailles | 6,986,788 | 1954 |
| 41 | The Wages of Fear | 6,944,306 | 1953 |
| 42 | Les Trois Frères | 6,897,098 | 1995 |
| 43 | Michel Strogoff | 6,868,854 | 1956 |
| 44 | Le gendarme se marie | 6,828,626 | 1968 |
| 45 | Asterix at the Olympic Games | 6,817,803 | 2008 |
| 46 | Mission spéciale | 6,781,120 | 1946 |
| 47 | Fanfan la Tulipe | 6,726,744 | 1952 |
| 48 | Qu'est-ce qu'on a encore fait au Bon Dieu ? | 6,711,618 | 2019 |
| 49 | Nous irons à Paris | 6,658,693 | 1950 |
| 50 | Manon des sources | 6,645,177 | 1986 |
| 51 | Taxi | 6,522,121 | 1998 |
| 52 | Arthur and the Invisibles | 6,396,989 | 2006 |
| 53 | La Cuisine au Beurre | 6,396,529 | 1963 |
| 54 | La Symphonie Pastorale | 6,373,123 | 1946 |
| 55 | My Father's Glory | 6,291,402 | 1990 |
| 56 | Le gendarme et les extra-terrestres | 6,280,070 | 1979 |
| 57 | Pas si bête | 6,195,419 | 1946 |
| 58 | Marche à l'ombre | 6,168,425 | 1984 |
| 59 | Germinal | 6,161,776 | 1993 |
| 60 | Taxi 3 | 6,151,691 | 2003 |
| 61 | La Chartreuse de Parme | 6,151,521 | 1948 |
| 62 | Mr. Orchid | 6,138,877 | 1946 |
| 63 | Oscar | 6,122,041 | 1967 |
| 64 | Mourir d'aimer | 5,912,404 | 1970 |
| 65 | My New Partner | 5,882,397 | 1984 |
| 66 | L'Aile ou la cuisse | 5,842,400 | 1976 |
| 67 | Le Bossu | 5,826,584 | 1959 |
| 68 | Les Anges gardiens | 5,793,034 | 1995 |
| 69 | Stadium Nuts | 5,744,270 | 1972 |
| 70 | Andalousie | 5,735,113 | 1951 |
| 71 | La Bataille du rail | 5,727,203 | 1946 |
| 72 | Going Places | 5,726,031 | 1974 |
| 73 | À nous les petites Anglaises | 5,704,446 | 1977 |
| 74 | La Vérité | 5,692,390 | 1960 |
| 75 | The Hunchback of Notre Dame | 5,687,222 | 1956 |
| 76 | Les Tuche 3 | 5,687,200 | 2018 |
| 77 | La Ch'tite famille | 5,626,049 | 2018 |
| 78 | Delusions of Grandeur | 5,562,576 | 1971 |
| 79 | The Brain | 5,547,305 | 1969 |
| 80 | Quai des Orfèvres | 5,544,721 | 1947 |
| 81 | The Little Bather | 5,542,796 | 1968 |
| 82 | Le petit Nicolas | 5,520,562 | 2009 |
| 83 | Gendarme in New York | 5,495,045 | 1965 |
| 84 | Camping | 5,491,412 | 2006 |
| 85 | Little White Lies | 5,457,251 | 2010 |
| 86 | L'as des as | 5,452,593 | 1982 |
| 87 | La Cage aux Folles | 5,406,614 | 1978 |
| 88 | Napoléon | 5,405,252 | 1955 |
| 89 | Papa, maman, la bonne et moi | 5,374,131 | 1954 |
| 90 | Operation Swallow: The Battle for Heavy Water | 5,373,377 | 1948 |
| 91 | The Three Musketeers | 5,354,839 | 1953 |
| 92 | Les Spécialistes | 5,319,564 | 1985 |
| 93 | The Closet | 5,317,858 | 2000 |
| 94 | Sur la piste du Marsupilami | 5,304,366 | 2012 |
| 95 | The Grand Maneuver | 5,302,076 | 1955 |
| 96 | La Jument verte | 5,272,066 | 1959 |
| 97 | Supercondriaque | 5,269,924 | 2014 |
| 98 | Le Professionnel | 5,243,511 | 1981 |
| 99 | La Vie en rose | 5,242,769 | 2007 |
| 100 | Lucy | 5,203,226 | 2014 |

== Most popular French film by season/year ==
| Season/Year | Title | Tickets sold | Ref |
|---|---|---|---|
| 1945/46 | La Bataille du rail | 5,260,000 | |
| 1946/47 | La Symphonie Pastorale | 6,320,000 | |
| 1947/48 | Monsieur Vincent | 6,850,000 | |
| 1948/49 | Operation Swallow: The Battle for Heavy Water | 4,880,000 | |
| 1949/50 | Barry | 4,050,000 | |
| 1950/51 | Nous irons à Paris | 6,190,000 | |
| 1951/52 | Fanfan la Tulipe | 5,770,000 | |
| 1952/53 | Le Petit Monde de Don Camillo | 12,280,000 | |
| 1953/54 | Royal Affairs in Versailles | 6,650,000 | |
| 1954/55 | Papa, maman, la bonne et moi | 5,320,000 | |
| 1955/56 | Napoléon | 5,160,000 | |
| 1956/57 | Michel Strogoff | 6,490,000 | |
| 1957/58 | Les Misérables (Part One)/Les Misérables (Part Two) | 4,730,000 | |
| 1958/59 | Young Sinners (Les Tricheurs) | 4,800,000 | |
| 1959/60 | La Vache et le Prisonnier | 7,850,000 | |
| 1960/61 | La Vérité | 5,500,000 | |
| 1961/62 | War of the Buttons | 7,300,000 | |
| 1962/63 | Any Number Can Win | 3,250,000 | |
| 1963/64 | La Cuisine au Beurre | 5,230,000 | |
| 1964/65 | Le Corniaud | 9,100,000 | |
| 1965/66 | Gendarme in New York | 4,840,000 | |
| 1966/67 | La Grande Vadrouille | 14,860,000 | |
| 1967/68 | Les grandes vacances | 5,670,000 | |
| 1968/69 | Le gendarme se marie | 6,230,000 | |
| 1969/70 | The Sicilian Clan | 4,610,000 | |
| 1970/71 | Mourir d'aimer | 5,900,000 | |
| 1971/72 | Les Bidasses en folie | 6,890,000 | |
| 1972/73 | Stadium Nuts | 5,050,000 | |
| 1973/74 | The Mad Adventures of Rabbi Jacob | 6,410,000 | |
| 1974/75 | Emmanuelle | 6,090,000 | |
| 1975/76 | À nous les petites Anglaises | 5,290,000 | |
| 1976/77 | L'Aile ou la cuisse | 4,300,000 | |
| 1977/78 | L'Animal | 3,000,000 | |
| 1978/79 | Le gendarme et les extra-terrestres | 6,020,000 | |
| 1980 | La Boum | 4,378,430 | |
| 1981 | La Chèvre | 7,079,674 | |
| 1982 | L'as des as | 5,452,593 | |
| 1983 | L'Été meurtrier | 5,137,040 | |
| 1984 | Marche à l'ombre | 6,168,425 | |
| 1985 | Three Men and a Cradle | 10,251,465 | |
| 1986 | Jean de Florette | 7,223,657 | |
| 1987 | Au revoir les enfants | 3,488,460 | |
| 1988 | The Big Blue | 9,074,317 | |
| 1989 | Trop belle pour toi | 2,031,131 | |
| 1990 | My Father's Glory | 6,291,402 | |
| 1991 | Une époque formidable... | 1,672,754 | |
| 1992 | Indochine | 3,198,663 | |
| 1993 | Les Visiteurs | 13,782,991 | |
| 1994 | Léon: The Professional | 3,350,000 | |
| 1995 | Un indien dans la ville | 5,616,000 | |
| 1996 | Pédale douce | 4,162,380 | |
| 1997 | The Fifth Element | 7,727,697 | |
| 1998 | Le Dîner de Cons | 8,583,366 | |
| 1999 | Asterix & Obelix Take On Caesar | 8,948,624 | |
| 2000 | Taxi 2 | 10,345,901 | |
| 2001 | Amélie | 8,173,491 | |
| 2002 | Asterix & Obelix: Mission Cleopatra | 14,559,509 | |
| 2003 | Taxi 3 | 6,151,691 | |
| 2004 | The Chorus | 8,636,016 | |
| 2005 | Brice de Nice | 4,424,136 | |
| 2006 | Les Bronzés 3 : Amis pour la vie | 10,355,928 | |
| 2007 | La Vie en Rose | 5,242,769 | |
| 2008 | Bienvenue chez les Ch'tis | 20,489,383 | |
| 2009 | Le petit Nicolas | 5,520,562 | |
| 2010 | Little White Lies | 5,457,251 | |
| 2011 | The Intouchables | 16,888,372 | |
| 2012 | Sur la piste du Marsupilami | 5,304,366 | |
| 2013 | Serial Teachers | 3,957,176 | |
| 2014 | Qu'est-ce qu'on a fait au Bon Dieu ? | 12,366,033 | |
| 2015 | The New Adventures of Aladdin | 4,439,602 | |
| 2016 | Les Tuche 2 | 4,619,897 | |
| 2017 | Raid dingue | 4,571,310 | |
| 2018 | Les Tuche 3 | 5,687,200 | |
| 2019 | Qu'est-ce qu'on a encore fait au Bon Dieu ? | 6,711,618 | |
| 2020 | Adieu les cons | 1,993,197 | |
| 2021 | Kaamelott: The First Chapter | 2,645,727 | |
| 2022 | Simone Veil, A Woman of the Century | 2,372,793 | |
| 2023 | Asterix & Obelix: The Middle Kingdom | 4,598,637 | |
| 2024 | A Little Something Extra | 10,830,209 | |

== See also ==
- Lists of highest-grossing films
