= Delusions of Grandeur (film) =

1971 film

La Folie des grandeurs Delusions of Grandeur
- French theatrical release poster
- Directed by: Gérard Oury
- Written by: Gérard Oury; Danièle Thompson; Marcel Jullian
- Based on: Ruy Blas by Victor Hugo
- Produced by: Alain Poiré
- Starring: Louis de Funès; Yves Montand; Alice Sapritch
- Cinematography: Henri Decae; Wladimir Ivanov
- Edited by: Albert Jurgenson
- Music by: Michel Polnareff; Hervé Roy
- Production companies: Gaumont International; Mars Film; Coral Films; Orion Filmproduktion
- Distributed by: Gaumont Distribution
- Release date: 8 December 1971
- Running time: 108 minutes
- Countries: France; Italy; Spain; West Germany
- Language: French
- Box office: $41.7 million

Delusions of Grandeur (French: La Folie des grandeurs) is a 1971 historical comedy film directed by Gérard Oury and starring Louis de Funès, Yves Montand and Alice Sapritch. It is a very liberal comedic adaptation of the play Ruy Blas by Victor Hugo. It was an international co-production between France, Italy, Spain and West Germany.

Set in 17th century Spain, film recounts the misadventures of the ignoble Don Salluste, greedy and hypocritical Minister of Finance of the King of Spain, deposed and chased from court by the Queen. Drunk with revenge, and ready to do anything to regain his functions and his wealth, he manipulates his former valet Blaze, overcome with love for the sovereign, in order to compromise the latter.

The idea of adapting Victor Hugo's romantic drama into a comedy film came to Gérard Oury in 1960, when he performed the play at the Comédie-Française. The great success of his films Le Corniaud in 1965 and La Grande Vadrouille in 1966 allowed his idea to see the light of day. Bourvil and Louis de Funès, headliners of the two films, were cast in the roles of Blaze and Don Salluste. After Bourvil's death from cancer in September 1970, and at the suggestion of Simone Signoret, Oury distributed the role of Blaze to Yves Montand.

== Plot ==
In the 17th century, during Spain’s Golden Age, Don Salluste de Bazan is the finance minister of Charles II, King of Spain. Don Salluste is a deceitful, hypocritical and greedy man who collects taxes personally, which he diverts largely for his own avarice. He is hated by the local populations he exploits.

After being accused by Queen Marie-Anne de Neubourg, a beautiful Bavarian princess, of having fathered an illegitimate child with one of her ladies-in-waiting, he is stripped of his functions and condemned to retire to a monastery. Determined to take revenge by cuckolding the king who would in turn be forced to repudiate her, he comes into contact with his attractive nephew, Caesar, who has become a brigand, but when Caesar refuses to enter into his scheme, Don Salluste has him captured by his henchmen and sends him as a slave in the Barbary coast. He then decides to use Blaze, his recently dismissed valet, for his revenge, as Don Salluste has discovered that Blaze has feelings for the queen. Don Salluste plans to pass off Blaze as Caesar and have him seduce the queen.

The day of his presentation at the royal court as the new finance minister, Blaze foils an attack planned against the king by the Grandee of Spain. He thus attracts the favors of the royal couple, in particular the queen who also has feelings for on him, and quickly becomes a minister. Following the situation from afar, Sallust discovers that Grandee have decided to take revenge on Blaze. Unlike Salluste, Blaze is generous and institutes many reforms: he gives almost all of Don Salluste's riches to the peasants, and starts heavily taxing the rich instead of the poor. This makes Blaze the target of ire among the nobles, who start an assignation plot against him.

During a game with the queen and her attendants in the garden, Blaze, hidden by a hedge, is about to declare his love for the queen, but the queen is replaced by the harsh duenna, Doña Juana. Blaze unwittingly woos Doña Juana, who enthusiastically receives his confession of love. In turn, she reveals her own ardent love for him, but Blaze has already slipped away. Thus, she expresses her feelings to the king's dog who has in the meantime replaced Blaze, who has therefore heard nothing of what Doña Juana confessed.

Don Salluste learns of a plot to poison Blaze's cake at his birthday celebration in a villa and warns Blaze; the two fight their way out of the villa, evading their pursuers by trapping them in a bullfighting ring. But while he takes his rescue as a simple favor from his former master, Blaze is instead taken prisoner by Don Salluste, still not understanding that he will be used in a much more ambitious plot. Don Salluste wants to arrange a romantic rendezvous with the queen and Caesar (Blaze) in an inn and have them surprised by the king, when they are asleep together in bed. Under the windows of the palace, he sends a cockatoo which must repeat a message designed for this purpose, but it goes to Doña Juana's room instead. While Don Salluste does not know about this mistake, he still manages to invite the queen herself. She goes to the inn and is put to sleep by Don Salluste who puts her in the room where he tied Blaze up beforehand.

The situation degenerates for Don Salluste when the real Caesar returns, who having escaped from the Barbary coast, frees Blaze. Then the plan is sullied once more with the arrival of Doña Juana in the inn who, totally uninhibited, engages in a striptease for Blaze. Blaze, uninterested by these advances, puts her to sleep using the sleeping pill that Don Salluste had intended for him. It is during this time that the king arrives, alerted by a letter from Don Salluste announcing his cuckolding. Thanks to Caesar's help, Blaze makes the king believe, before the eyes of a distraught Don Salluste, that he is Doña Juana's suitor and that the queen is away on a trip. The queen is actually under a window of the inn, dozing on the roof of a carriage in the company of Caesar. Blaze watches them leave, moved, seeing another with his love. Finally the king sends Don Salluste and Blaze to the Barbary coast, the first because of his slanderous letter, and the second because he would rather become a slave than marry Doña Juana . Don Salluste, who has apparently gone insane after the downfall of his plot, rambles about a new plot in which he becomes queen to regain his old wealth. In the last scene Doña Juana is seen arriving in the desert, disheveled, and announcing her love for Blaze, who flees away from her.

== Cast ==
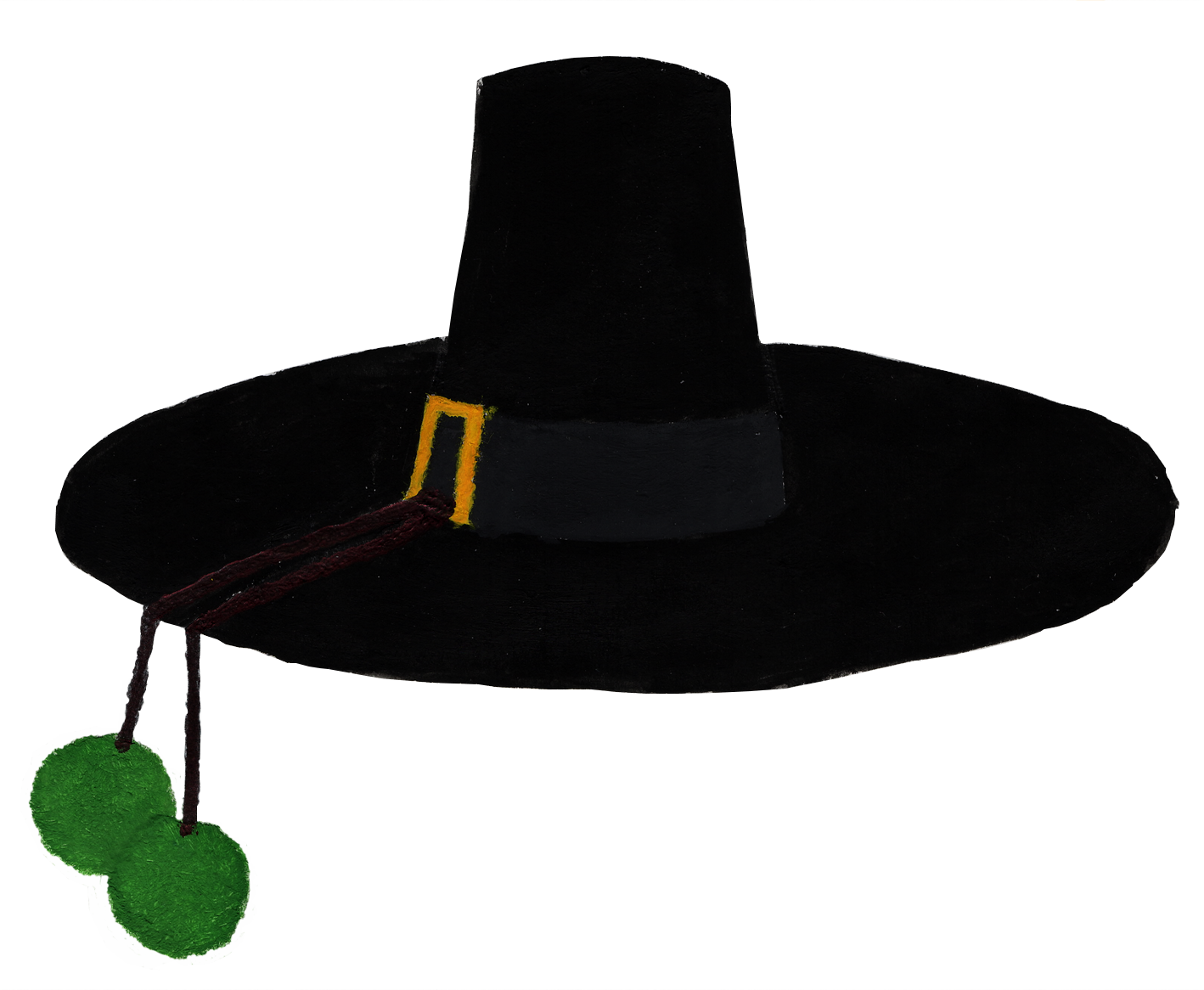
Don Salluste's hat

- Louis de Funès as Don Salluste de Bazan
- Yves Montand as Blaze
- Alice Sapritch as Doña Juana, the duenna of the Queen
- Karin Schubert as The Queen
- Alberto de Mendoza as The King
- Jaime de Mora y Aragón as A Grandee of Spain
- Eduardo Fajardo as A Grandee of Spain
- Antonio Pica as A Grandee of Spain
- Joaquín Solís as A Grandee of Spain
- Venantino Venantini as Marquess del Basto
- Gabriele Tinti as Don Caesar
- Paul Préboist as The mute servant of Don Salluste
- Sal Borgese as The one-eyed servant of Don Salluste

== Release ==
The premiere of La Folie des grandeurs took place on December 8, 1971 at the Gaumont Ambassade, exactly five years after the release of La Grande Vadrouille in the same cinema that Oury had since called his “favorite cinema”. The English version of the film was released by Synkronized USA.

== See also ==
- Ruy Blas (1948)
