= List of 2015 box office number-one films in France =

This is a list of films which placed number one at the weekly box office in France during 2015. The weeks start on Wednesdays, and finish on Tuesdays. The box-office number one is established in terms of tickets sold during the week.

== Box office number-one films ==
| † | This implies the highest-grossing movie of the year. |

| Week | End date for the week | Film | Tickets sold | Note(s) |
|---|---|---|---|---|
| 1 | January 6, 2015 | La Famille Bélier | 1,148,894 | |
| 2 | January 13, 2015 | La Famille Bélier | 620,231 | |
| 3 | January 20, 2015 | La Famille Bélier | 654,666 | |
| 4 | January 27, 2015 | Taken 3 | 1,192,842 | |
| 5 | February 3, 2015 | Taken 3 | 588,733 | |
| 6 | February 10, 2015 | Daddy or Mommy | 757,255 | |
| 7 | February 17, 2015 | Fifty Shades of Grey | 2,081,638 | |
| 8 | February 24, 2015 | American Sniper | 1,083,056 | |
| 9 | March 3, 2015 | American Sniper | 753,043 | |
| 10 | March 10, 2015 | American Sniper | 394,112 | |
| 11 | March 17, 2015 | American Sniper | 266,589 | |
| 12 | March 24, 2015 | The Divergent Series: Insurgent | 1,172,398 | |
| 13 | March 31, 2015 | Cinderella | 636,418 | |
| 14 | April 7, 2015 | Furious 7 | 2,158,508 | |
| 15 | April 14, 2015 | Furious 7 | 896,443 | |
| 16 | April 21, 2015 | Furious 7 | 558,290 | |
| 17 | April 28, 2015 | Avengers: Age of Ultron | 1,926,049 | |
| 18 | May 5, 2015 | Avengers: Age of Ultron | 1,145,569 | |
| 19 | May 12, 2015 | Avengers: Age of Ultron | 514,233 | |
| 20 | May 19, 2015 | Mad Max: Fury Road | 905,012 | |
| 22 | May 26, 2015 | Mad Max: Fury Road | 586,046 | |
| 23 | June 2, 2015 | San Andreas | 471,962 | |
| 24 | June 9, 2015 | San Andreas | 250,779 | |
| 25 | June 16, 2015 | Jurassic World | 2,087,959 | |
| 26 | June 23, 2015 | Jurassic World | 1,012,256 | |
| 27 | June 30, 2015 | Jurassic World | 782,416 | |
| 28 | July 7, 2015 | Serial Teachers 2 | 1,180,383 | |
| 29 | July 14, 2015 | Minions | 2,180,461 | |
| 30 | July 21, 2015 | Minions | 1,205,532 | |
| 31 | July 28, 2015 | Minions | 943,336 | |
| 32 | August 4, 2015 | The Little Prince | 641,055 | |
| 33 | August 11, 2015 | Fantastic Four | 657,288 | |
| 34 | August 18, 2015 | Mission: Impossible – Rogue Nation | 1,233,768 | |
| 35 | August 25, 2015 | Mission: Impossible – Rogue Nation | 646,680 | |
| 36 | September 1, 2015 | Mission: Impossible – Rogue Nation | 395,388 | |
| 37 | September 8, 2015 | The Brand New Testament | 301,140 | |
| 38 | September 15, 2015 | Solace | 329,959 | |
| 39 | September 22, 2015 | Marguerite | 264,495 | |
| 40 | September 29, 2015 | Everest | 313,160 | |
| 41 | October 6, 2015 | Everest | 246,609 | |
| 42 | October 13, 2015 | Maze Runner: The Scorch Trials | 1,190,062 | |
| 43 | October 20, 2015 | The New Adventures of Aladdin † | 1,452,753 | |
| 44 | October 27, 2015 | The New Adventures of Aladdin † | 1,365,473 | |
| 45 | November 3, 2015 | The New Adventures of Aladdin † | 738,901 | |
| 46 | November 10, 2015 | The Martian | 363,592 | |
| 47 | November 17, 2015 | Spectre | 2,203,549 | |
| 48 | November 24, 2015 | The Hunger Games: Mockingjay – Part 2 | 1,231,013 | |
| 49 | December 1, 2015 | The Hunger Games: Mockingjay – Part 2 | 670,565 | |
| 50 | December 8, 2015 | Babysitting 2 | 801,212 | |
| 51 | December 15, 2015 | Babysitting 2 | 494,361 | |
| 52 | December 22, 2015 | Star Wars: The Force Awakens | 3,801,235 | |
| 53 | December 29, 2015 | Star Wars: The Force Awakens | 3,002,116 | |

== Highest-grossing French productions ==
This is a list of domestic films, released in 2015, that have registered over one million admissions in France.

| Rank | Original title | English title | Tickets sold | Distributor |
|---|---|---|---|---|
| 1 | Les Nouvelles aventures d'Aladin | The New Adventures of Aladdin | 4,380,436 | Pathé Distribution |
| 2 | Les Profs 2 | Serial Teachers 2 | 3,460,699 | UGC Distribution |
| 3 | Babysitting 2 | Babysitting 2 | 3,203,541 | Universal Pictures International |
| 4 | Papa ou maman | Daddy or Mommy | 2,849,976 | Pathé Distribution |
| 5 | Taken 3 | Taken 3 | 2,614,008 | EuropaCorp. Distribution |
| 6 | Pourquoi j'ai pas mangé mon père | Why I Did (Not) Eat My Father | 2,361,812 | Pathé Distribution |
| 7 | Belle et Sébastien : l'aventure continue | Belle & Sebastian: The Adventure Continues | 1,818,384 | Gaumont Distribution |
| 8 | Le Petit Prince | The Little Prince | 1,816,320 | Paramount Pictures |
| 9 | Bis | Bis | 1,506,009 | EuropaCorp. Distribution |
| 10 | Le Dernier Loup | Wolf Totem | 1,277,584 | Mars Distribution |
| 11 | Connasse, Princesse des cœurs | The Parisian Bitch | 1,194,678 | Gaumont Distribution |
| 12 | Le Grand Partage | The Roommates Party | 1,169,659 | Wild Bunch |
| 13 | Les Souvenirs | Memories | 1,034,505 | UGC Distribution |
| 14 | Marguerite | Marguerite | 1,023,461 | Memento Films Distribution |
| 15 | L'Hermine | Courted | 1,002,591 | Gaumont Distribution |
| 16 | La Loi du marché | The Measure of a Man | 1,001,498 | Diaphana Distribution |

== See also ==
- List of French films of 2015
- Lists of highest-grossing films in France
