= Marcel Jullian =

French author, screenwriter and director

- Born: 31 January 1922; Châteaurenard (Bouches-du-Rhône), France
- Died: 28 June 2004 (aged 82); Paris, France
- Occupations: Author; Screenwriter
- Years active: 1953–2000

Marcel Jullian (31 January 1922—28 June 2004) was a French author, screenwriter for French film and television, and occasional director. He was one of the founders of the TV channel Antenne 2, and its first president from January 1975 to December 1977.

== Selected books ==
- Heaven Knight: Charles Nungesser (1953)
- HMS Fidelity, Mystery Ship (1956)
- Air People (1959)
- Jean Maridor, Hunter V1 (1959)
- Histoire de la France et des Français au jour le jour (8 volumes, with Alain Decaux, André Castelot and Jacques Levron) (1976-1977)
- Count Henri of Paris: Memories of Exile and Struggle (1979)
- La Télévision libre (1981)
- Histoire de France des commerçants (with C. Meyer and Robert Laffont) (1983)
- Franchise postale (with J Chancel) (1983)
- I am François Villon (1987)
- Introduction to the History of the Kings of France (1989)
- The Time of Joan of Arc: 1408-1447 (with Alain Decaux, André Castelot, Jacques Levron and Robert Laffont) (1989)
- Charlemagne (1993)
- De Gaulle: Thoughts, Reflections and Anecdotes (1995)
- Le Roman de l'homme, La Préhistoire (1997)
- Français, collège (1999)
- Mémoire buissonière (poetry) (2000) - 2001 Prix Cazes

== Selected films and television ==
- Greed in the Sun (1964)
- The Sucker (1965)
- La Grande Vadrouille (1966)
- Lagardère (1967) (TV miniseries)
- The Brain (1969)
- Delusions of Grandeur (1971)
- Les Rois maudits (1972) (TV miniseries)
- La Soif de l'or (1993)

Jullian wrote and directed the 1983 film L'Été de nos 15 ans (The Summer of Our 15 Years) and the 1984 film Les parents ne sont pas simples cette année. He also codirected Jean Giraudoux, a 1995 installment of Un siècle d'écrivains ("a century of writers"), a French series of television documentary films aired focusing on 20th century writers that was broadcast on France 3.
