= Günter Meisner =

German actor (1926–1994)

- Meisner as Mr. Wilkinson in Willy Wonka & the Chocolate Factory (1971)
- Born: 18 April 1926; Bremen, Germany
- Died: 5 December 1994 (aged 68); Berlin, Germany
- Occupation: Actor
- Years active: 1957–1994
- Known for: Mr Slugworth / Mr. Wilkinson in Willy Wonka & the Chocolate Factory
- Spouse: Gisela Albrecht Meisner

Günter Meisner (18 April 1926 – 5 December 1994) was a German character actor. He is remembered for his several cinematic portrayals of Adolf Hitler and for his role as Arthur Slugworth / Mr. Wilkinson in Willy Wonka & the Chocolate Factory. He was fluent in four languages (German, French, Italian and English) and appeared in many English-language, German-language and French-language films.

== Early life and career ==
Meisner was born in Bremen, Germany in 1926 and briefly worked at a steel foundry before training as a radio operator with the Luftwaffe's Fallschirmjäger (paratroopers). After the war, although interested in a career in sculpture and painting, in 1948 he switched to drama and studied under Gustaf Gründgens at Düsseldorf's State Conservatory, where he also got his first job at the local Schauspielhaus.

=== Film and TV ===
Meisner often played stock character Nazi officers and other sinister characters. He portrayed Hitler in the 1982 Franco-German action comedy, L'as des as (Ace of Aces). He also appeared in the ABC television miniseries The Winds of War as well as the CBS miniseries Blood and Honor and Southern Television's Winston Churchill: The Wilderness Years.

Other films Meisner took part in were Is Paris Burning?, The Quiller Memorandum, Funeral in Berlin, and The Boys from Brazil. He was Mr. Slugworth/Mr. Wilkinson in the 1971 film version of Willy Wonka & the Chocolate Factory. He also appeared in several television commercials.

=== Theatre ===
Meisner founded the Gallery Diogenes in Berlin in 1959, and in 1961 he founded the International Association for Arts and Sciences. In 1962 Meisner established the Diogenes Studio Theater.

=== Africa ===
From 1967 to 1969 Meisner participated in relief efforts in Biafra, Nigeria. He also produced two films: Don't Look for Me in Places Where I Can't Be Found and Bega Dwa Bega (One for All), a Swahili-language film for the Tanzanian Film Unit.

== Death ==
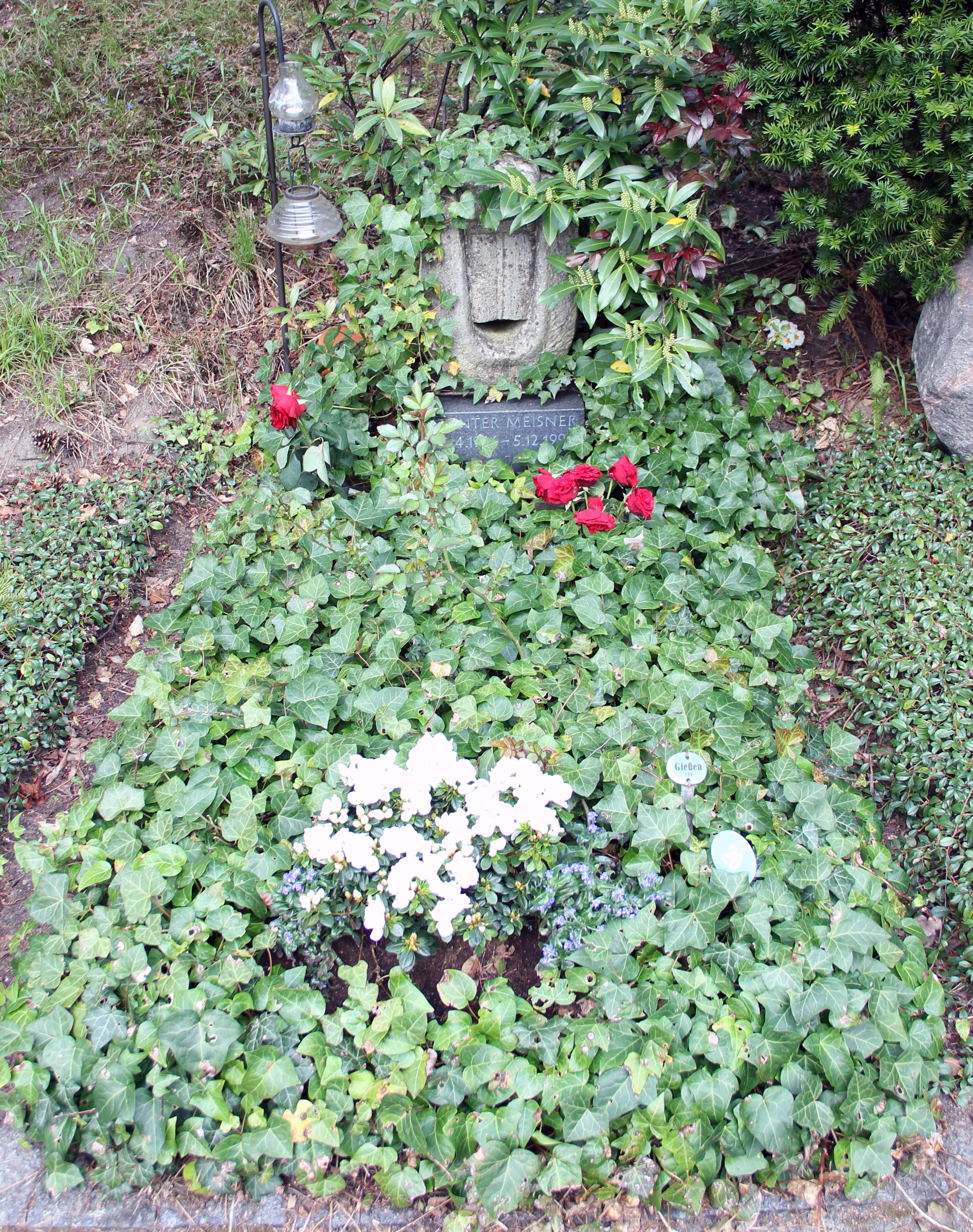
Meisner's grave

Meisner died in Berlin on 5 December 1994 at the age of 68 of heart failure. He is buried in Berlin's Friedhof Heerstrasse.

== Selected filmography ==
- 1957: A Time to Love and a Time to Die (uncredited)
- 1957: Kopf oder Zahl, as Kid
- 1958: Viel Lärm um nichts
- 1958: Here I Am, Here I Stay (Hier bin ich – hier bleib ich)
- 1959: Aus dem Tagebuch eines Frauenarztes
- 1959: Babette Goes to War (Babette s'en va-t-en guerre)
- 1959: The Death Ship (Das Totenschiff), as Paul, Trimmer auf der Yorikke
- 1959: The Black Chapel, as 1. Killer
- 1961: Question 7, as Schmidt
- 1961: The Miracle of Father Malachia (Das Wunder des Malachias), as Crazy Preacher
- 1961: It Can't Always Be Caviar, as Redner Meetingsaal
- 1961: This Time It Must Be Caviar, as Redner (uncredited)
- 1962: The Counterfeit Traitor, as Priest (uncredited)
- 1962: Das Testament des Dr. Mabuse, as Kurzschluß-Henry (uncredited)
- 1963: The Black Cobra (Die schwarze Kobra), as Wunderlich ('Mr. Green')
- 1963: Hafenpolizei - Der blaue Brief (TV series), as Johnny Massels
- 1964: Murderer in the Fog, as Kriminalassistent Behrend
- 1965: Code Name: Jaguar, as Russian Officer
- 1966: Die Gentlemen bitten zur Kasse (1966, TV miniseries), as Smiler Jackson
- 1966: Is Paris Burning? (Paris brûle-t-il?), as Commandant SS à Pantin
- 1966: The Quiller Memorandum, as Hassler
- 1966: Funeral in Berlin, as Kreutzman
- 1967: The College Girl Murders, as Greaves
- 1969: The Bridge at Remagen, as SS Gen. Gerlach
- 1970: Hauser's Memory, as Korowiew
- 1970: Poker - Poker (Short)
- 1971: Willy Wonka & the Chocolate Factory, as Arthur Slugworth
- 1971: Ludwig L (Short film), as Der Betrunkene
- 1973: The Battle of Sutjeska, as Rudolf Lüters
- 1973: Werwölfe
- 1974: Die Verrohung des Franz Blum, as Borsig
- 1974: The Odessa File, as General Greifer
- 1974: Borsalino & Co., as Le médecin
- 1974: Between Wars, as Karl Schneider
- 1975: La Chair de l'orchidée, as L'avocat-conseil
- 1975: A Happy Family Life, as Hektiker
- 1975: Inside Out, as Schmidt
- 1976: Voyage of the Damned, as Robert Hoffman
- 1977: The Brothers, as Pfarrer
- 1977: Heinrich
- 1977: The Serpent's Egg, as Convict
- 1978: The Boys from Brazil, as Farnbach
- 1978: When Hitler Stole Pink Rabbit (TV film), as Berg
- 1979: Schöner Gigolo, armer Gigolo, as Betrunkener Arbeiter (uncredited)
- 1979: Breakthrough, as SS-Offizier
- 1979: Avalanche Express, as Rudi Muehler
- 1979: Ticket of No Return (Bildnis einer Trinkerin), as Direktor Willi
- 1979: Ein Kapitel für sich (TV miniseries)
- 1980: The American Success Company, as Maitre d'
- 1980: Gibbi Westgermany, as Patient
- 1980: The Dream House, as Grimme
- 1980: Winston Churchill: The Wilderness Years (TV Series), as Adolf Hitler
- 1981: Silas (TV miniseries), as Fabian Fedder
- 1982: Night Crossing, as Major Koerner
- 1982: Blood and Honor: Youth Under Hitler (TV Series), as Schneider
- 1982: Rom ist in der kleinsten Hütte (TV Series)
- 1982: The Man on the Wall, as Dr. Steiner
- 1982: L'As des as, as Adolf Hitler / Angela Hitler
- 1982: Zwei Tote im Sender und Don Carlos im Pogl (TV Movie), as Maskenbildner
- 1983: The Winds of War, as Adolf Hitler
- 1983: Plem, Plem - Die Schule brennt
- 1983: Chamäleon (TV Series)
- 1984: Under the Volcano, as Herr Krausberg - the German Attaché (uncredited)
- 1984: Der Mord mit der Schere (Short)
- 1985: Drei gegen Drei, as Prof. Holl
- 1986: Close Up (Short film), as KGB-Chef
- 1986: Tras el cristal, as Klaus
- 1986: Das Geheimnis von Lismore Castle (TV Movie), as Sir Ralph Whitecombe
- 1986: Gestatten, Bestatter, as Herr Abendroth
- 1987: Die Saat des Hasses (Visperas) (TV Series)
- 1987: Indras Rache (Tout est dans la fin), as Hamerstein
- 1987: Der elegante Hund (TV Series)
- 1988: The Case of Mr. Spalt, as Bobby Steinbeck
- 1989: Magdalene, as Prior
- 1989: Bride of the Orient (La Fiancée thaïlandaise / Gekauftes Glück), as Pfarrer Barmettler
- 1989: Roselyne and the Lions, as Klint
- 1989: The Saint: The Big Bang (TV Series), as Kuhler
- 1989: Moon Child (El niño de la luna), as Abuelo militar
- 1990: Estación Central, as Alex' friend
- 1990: The Man Inside, as Judge
- 1990: Il piccolo popolo (TV Movie), as Schneider
- 1990: Te Rua, as Prof. Biederstedt
- 1991: Leporella
- 1992: Ruby Cairo, as Herr Bruchner, EDK Executive
- 1993: Faraway, So Close! (In weiter Ferne, so nah!), as Fälscher
- 1993: Posthuman, as Doctor
- 1993: Harry & Sunny (TV Series), as Kneipenwirt
- 1994: The Violin Player (Le joueur de violon)
- 1994: Air Albatros (TV Series), as Lauffendingk Sr.
- 1994: Eine Mutter kämpft um ihren Sohn, as Wegener
