= Ace of Aces (1982 film) =

L'as des as
- Theatrical release poster
- Directed by: Gérard Oury
- Written by: Gérard Oury; Danièle Thompson
- Produced by: Alain Poiré; Horst Wendlandt
- Starring: Jean-Paul Belmondo; Marie-France Pisier; Frank Hoffmann; Rachid Ferrache; Günter Meisner
- Cinematography: Xaver Schwarzenberger
- Edited by: Albert Jurgenson
- Music by: Vladimir Cosma
- Distributed by: Gaumont Distribution
- Release date: November 1982
- Running time: 100 minutes
- Countries: France; Germany
- Languages: French; German
- Budget: $6.1 million
- Box office: $40.9 million

L'as des as (The Ace of Aces; alternate English title: The Super Ace) is a 1982 French-German action comedy film starring Jean-Paul Belmondo and directed by Gérard Oury.

The Ace of Aces was a huge public success, reaching five and a half million spectators in France, which was the second best box office (after The Brain) for Jean-Paul Belmondo.

== Plot ==
In 1916, during World War I, a German and a French fighter ace by the names of Gunther von Beckman (Hoffman) and Jo Cavalier (Belmondo) manage to drag each other out of the sky. An argument and subsequent fistfight about who is to be whose prisoner is interrupted by an artillery barrage on their position, forcing both to work together in order to survive. In a humorous side scene, Corporal Adolf Hitler (Meisner) is berated by his frustrated First Lieutenant Rosenblum for his clumsiness.

In 1936, 20 years later, Jo and his team of boxers travel to Germany to participate in the Olympic Games in Berlin. On the train Jo meets young Simon Rosenblum (Ferrache), the grandson of aforementioned First Lieutenant Rosenblum and a Jew, and a beautiful reporter named Gaby Delcourt (Pisier), who is to interview Hitler. When his grandfather does not show up at the station, Simon asks Jo, whom he idolizes for his World War I days, to accompany him to his grandfather's bookstore. Arriving there, Jo gets into a fight with Gestapo agents who are demolishing the place, and subsequently he is asked by the whole Rosenblum family to hide them. Knowing no other place, he takes them to his team's hotel, which also happens to be Gaby's domicile. Jo begins to flamboyantly flirt with Gaby, who seems to return his affections.

The next morning, just before they depart for the stadium for the opening ceremony, Jo re-encounters his old friend Gunther, now a general of the Luftwaffe. He fast-talks Gunther into borrowing his car, which he gives to the Rosenblums for their escape to Austria. Due to a critical blunder on the Rosenblums' part, however, the whole family is caught before they reach the border, and only Simon escapes. The boy phones Gaby, who informs Jo. Torn between his affection for Gaby, his sense of duty for Simon, and the need to see his team in the games (though not in that order), Jo decides to settle the matter as quickly as possible and goes off to fetch Simon.

However, things do not go as planned. The Gestapo is hot on Jo's heels, a bear drives him and Simon from their forest camp, and they temporarily pick up its cub, whom they spontaneously name Beethoven. Finally they are captured and taken to the next police station, where the rest of the Rosenblums are also held. Gunther arrives to secure the release of his friend, but Jo will not abandon the Rosenblums and takes Gunther for all appearances hostage. As they drive to the Austrian border, Gunther advises Jo to go with the Rosenblums since he is now considered a fugitive criminal, and Jo reluctantly agrees.

However, due to circumstances the group misses the way and ends up right in Hitler's Berghof residence on the Obersalzberg. Mistaking it for a simple hotel, they are taken in by the grounds' caretaker, Hitler's sister Angela (again played by Meisner). As it so happens, Gunther has been invited by Hitler to the Berghof for a staff conference, along with Gaby, to whom Gunther has also taken a fancy. Jo is quick to find out about the residence's true nature, however, when he comes face to face with Hitler himself while following the Olympic boxing finals on the radio in the latter's personal office. He procures an officer's uniform, reveals himself to Gunther and Gaby, and devises a plan to rescue the Rosenblums by stealing Hitler's personal car, while a very reluctant Gunther is to create a diversion by eloping with Angela Hitler.

The film ends with a furious car chase between Jo, the Rosenblums and Gaby in one car, and Hitler and his adjutants in another, during the course of which the elderly Rosenblum reveals himself to his old subordinate. Startled by the unexpected encounter with his former commanding officer, Hitler is sent crashing into a duck pond, while Jo and company successfully escape to Austria (a humorous hint on the Anschluss which would follow two years later), where they also encounter Beethoven again.

== Cast ==
- Jean-Paul Belmondo as Jo Cavalier
- Marie-France Pisier as Gaby Delcourt
- Frank Hoffmann as Günther von Beckmann
- Günter Meisner as Adolf Hitler/Angela Hitler
- Benno Sterzenbach as Major Aschbach - Gestapo officer
- Rachid Ferrache as Simon Rosenblum
- Yves Pignot as Lucien
- Hans Wyprächtiger as Oberleutnant 'Grandpa' Rosenblum

== Release ==
The film grossed $6,552,000 in its first week of release in France, including a record 6 million French franc ($1,670,000) in Paris from 463,000 admissions.
