= Gérard Oury =

French film director, actor and writer (1919–2006)

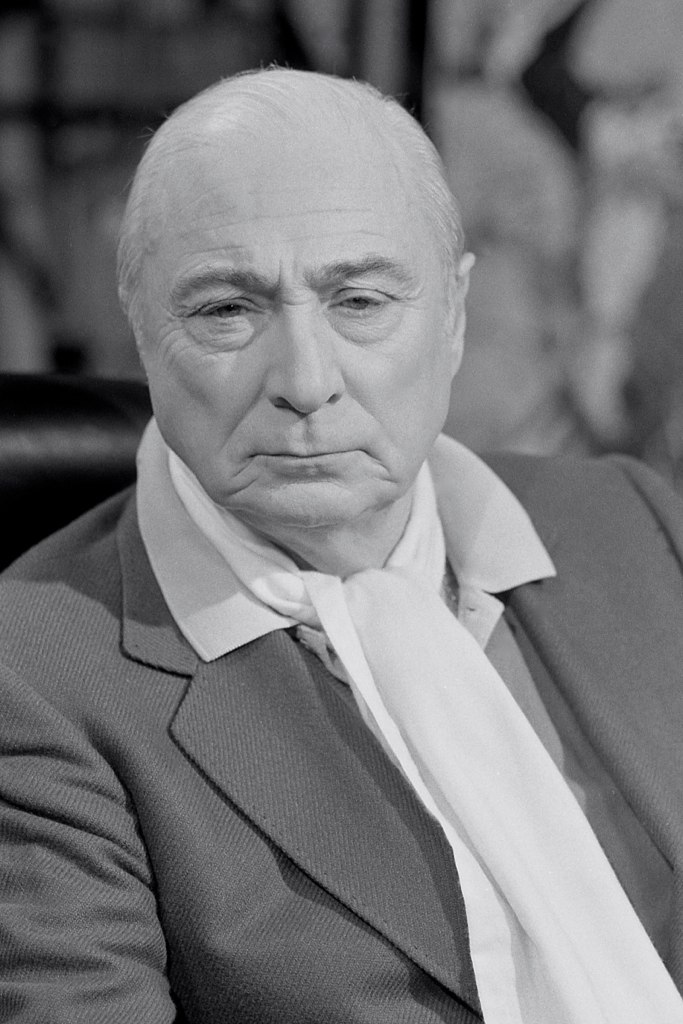
- Oury in 1984
- Born: Max-Gérard Houry Tenenbaum; 29 April 1919; Paris, France
- Died: 20 July 2006 (aged 87); Saint-Tropez, France
- Years active: 1942–2003
- Spouse: Michèle Morgan (m. 1960)

Gérard Oury (French: [ʒeʁaʁ uʁi]; born Max-Gérard Houry Tenenbaum; 29 April 1919 – 20 July 2006) was a French film director, actor and writer. He is best known for a number of comedies he directed and co-wrote between the 1960s and 1980s, most notably The Sucker (1965), Don't Look Now... We're Being Shot At! (1966), The Brain (1969), The Mad Adventures of Rabbi Jacob (1973), and Ace of Aces (1982).

== Life and career ==
Max-Gérard Houry-Tenenbaum was the only son of Serge Tenenbaum, a violinist of Russian-Jewish origin, and French Jewish Marcelle Houry, a journalist and art critic. Tenenbaum was absent from the life of Oury and he was raised in an unobservant house of his mother and maternal grandmother Berthe Goldner. Oury studied at the Lycée Janson de Sailly and then at the National Conservatory of Dramatic Art. He became a member of the Comédie-Française before World War II, but fled with all his family (mother, grandmother and unofficial wife, actress Jacqueline Roman) to Switzerland to escape the anti-Jewish persecutions by the Vichy government. When in 1942 his daughter Danièle Thompson was born, his fatherhood was concealed, to avoid her classification as a Jew.

After 1945 he returned to the liberated Paris and restarted his career as an actor, performing in the theatre and in supporting roles in the cinema. Oury became a movie director in 1959 (The Itchy Palm) and gained his first success in 1961 with Crime Does Not Pay (Le crime ne paie pas).

Pairing André Bourvil and Louis de Funès as a comic duo, he burst into commercial filmmaking with 1965's The Sucker (Le corniaud). The film was entered into the 4th Moscow International Film Festival. The following year, Don't Look Now... We're Being Shot At! (La Grande Vadrouille) was even more successful, attracting the largest audiences ever in France (17.27 million admissions). This box-office record stood for decades, only surpassed in 1997 by Titanic from James Cameron.

Oury shot the 1969 comedy Le Cerveau (The Brain) in English, starring David Niven in the lead role as a criminal mastermind.

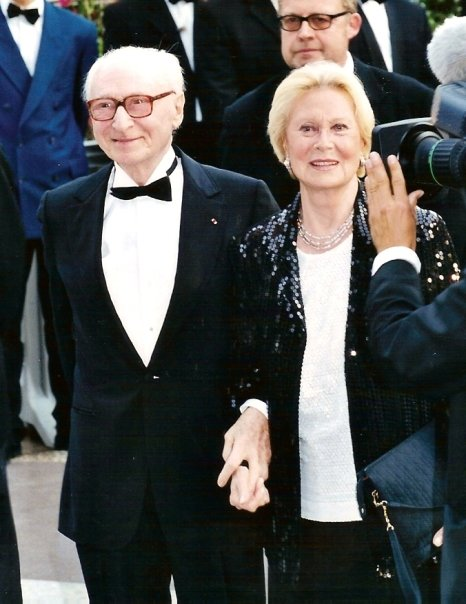
Oury with spouse Michèle Morgan at the Cannes Film Festival, 2001

With actress Jacqueline Roman, he was the father of French writer Danièle Thompson and grandfather of actor/writer Christopher Thompson. He lived together with the French actress Michèle Morgan for the second half of his life. He died aged 87 in Saint-Tropez on 20 July 2006.

== Filmography ==
Year	Title	Director	Writer
1958	Le Miroir à deux faces	No	Yes
1960	Come Dance with Me!	No	Yes
1960	La Main chaude	Yes	Yes
1961	La Menace	Yes	No
1962	Crime Does Not Pay	Yes	Yes
1965	The Sucker	Yes	Yes
1966	La Grande Vadrouille	Yes	Yes
1969	The Brain	Yes	Yes
1971	Delusions of Grandeur	Yes	Yes
1973	The Mad Adventures of Rabbi Jacob	Yes	Yes
1978	La Carapate	Yes	Yes
1980	The Umbrella Coup	Yes	Yes
1982	The Ace of Aces / The Super Ace	Yes	Yes
1984	La vengeance du serpent à plumes	Yes	Yes
1987	Lévy et Goliath	Yes	Yes
1993	La Soif de l'or	Yes	Yes
1996	Fantôme avec chauffeur	Yes	No
1999	Le schpountz	Yes	Yes

Actor

Year	Title	Role	Director	Notes
1942	Les Petits Riens	Philinte	Raymond Leboursier	
1947	Antoine and Antoinette	a customer	Jacques Becker	
1949	Jo la Romance	Roland Grenier	Gilles Grangier	
1949	Du Guesclin	Charles V of France	Bernard Delatour	
1950	La Souricière	Petit rôle	Henri Calef	Uncredited
1950	La Belle que voilà	Bruno	Jean-Paul Le Chanois	
1951	Without Leaving an Address	a journalist	Jean-Paul Le Chanois	
1951	Mr. Peek-a-Boo	Maurice	Jean Boyer	
1951	The Night Is My Kingdom	Lionel Moreau	Georges Lacombe	
1952	Le Costaud des Batignolles	Récitant / Narrator	Guy Lacourt	Voice
1953	Endless Horizons		Jean Dréville	Voice
1953	Sea Devils	Napoleon	Raoul Walsh	
1953	The Sword and the Rose	the Dauphin	Ken Annakin	
1953	The Heart of the Matter	Yusef	George More O'Ferrall	
1954	They Who Dare	Captain George Two	Lewis Milestone	
1954	Father Brown	Inspector Dubois	Robert Hamer	
1954	Loves of Three Queens	Napoleon Bonaparte	Marc Allégret and Edgar G. Ulmer	(segment: Napoleon and Josephine)
1954	The River Girl	Enzo Cinti	Mario Soldati	
1954	I cavalieri dell'illusione	Napoleone Bonaparte	Marc Allégret	
1955	The Heroes Are Tired	Villeterre	Yves Ciampi	
1956	La Meilleure Part	Gérard Bailly - un ingénieur	Yves Allégret	
1956	House of Secrets	Julius Pindar	Guy Green	
1957	Méfiez-vous fillettes	Marcel Palmer	Yves Allégret	
1958	Seventh Heaven	Maurice Portal	Raymond Bernard	
1958	Back to the Wall	Jacques Decrey	Édouard Molinaro	
1958	Le Miroir à deux faces	Doctor Bosc	André Cayatte	
1959	The Journey	Teklel Hafouli	Anatole Litvak	
1960	La Main chaude	Cameo Appearance	Gérard Oury	Uncredited
1961	The Menace	Le docteur	Gérard Oury	
1963	The Prize	Doctor Claude Marceau	Mark Robson	
1986	A Man and a Woman: 20 Years Later	Un spectateur de '40 ans déjà'	Claude Lelouch	Uncredited
2003	Là-haut, un roi au-dessus des nuages	Le général de La Motte-Noire	Pierre Schoendoerffer	(final film role)
