= List of 2013 box office number-one films in France =

This is a list of films which placed number one at the weekly box office in France during 2013. The weeks start on Wednesdays, and finish on Tuesdays. The box-office number one is established in terms of tickets sold during the week.

== Box office number-one films ==
†	This implies the highest-grossing movie of the year.

Week	End date for the week	Film	Tickets sold	Note(s)
1	January 8, 2013	The Hobbit: An Unexpected Journey	585,701	
2	January 15, 2013	On the Other Side of the Tracks	248,296	
3	January 22, 2013	Django Unchained	1,128,810	
4	January 29, 2013	Django Unchained	922,998	
5	February 5, 2013	Django Unchained	647,571	
6	February 12, 2013	Django Unchained	460,006	
7	February 19, 2013	Hotel Transylvania	427,257	
8	February 26, 2013	A Good Day to Die Hard	830,130	
9	March 5, 2013	Boule et Bill	871,475	
10	March 12, 2013	Boule et Bill	539,970	
11	March 19, 2013	Oz the Great and Powerful	788,437	
12	March 26, 2013	Jappeloup	388,345	
13	April 2, 2013	G.I. Joe: Retaliation	437,058	
14	April 9, 2013	G.I. Joe: Retaliation	213,300	
15	April 16, 2013	Oblivion	598,132	
16	April 23, 2013	Les Profs †	1,037,269	
17	April 30, 2013	Iron Man 3	2,064,740	
18	May 7, 2013	Iron Man 3	1,011,904	
19	May 14, 2013	Iron Man 3	656,686	
20	May 21, 2013	The Great Gatsby	760,438	
21	May 28, 2013	Fast & Furious 6	1,546,806	
22	June 4, 2013	The Hangover Part III	944,983	
23	June 11, 2013	After Earth	548,418	
24	June 18, 2013	Star Trek Into Darkness	433,073	
25	June 25, 2013	Man of Steel	1,054,552	
26	July 2, 2013	Despicable Me 2	1,418,855	
27	July 9, 2013	World War Z	1,209,900	
28	July 16, 2013	Monsters University	587,446	
29	July 23, 2013	Pacific Rim	510,094	
30	July 30, 2013	The Wolverine	1,029,033	
31	August 6, 2013	Now You See Me	961,911	
32	August 13, 2013	Now You See Me	625,131	
33	August 20, 2013	Elysium	608,085	
34	August 27, 2013	Percy Jackson: Sea of Monsters	391,482	
35	September 3, 2013	Red 2	336,533	
36	September 10, 2013	White House Down	272,508	
37	September 17, 2013	The Butler	378,298	
38	September 24, 2013	The Butler	306,836	
39	October 1, 2013	Blue Jasmine	494,375	
40	October 8, 2013	Eyjafjallajökull	545,928	
41	October 15, 2013	Planes	433,188	
42	October 22, 2013	Turbo	687,807	
43	October 29, 2013	Gravity	1,493,000	
44	November 5, 2013	Thor: The Dark World	1,159,433	
45	November 12, 2013	Gravity	646,535	
46	November 19, 2013	The Counselor	343,622	
47	November 26, 2013	Me, Myself and Mum	707,156	
48	December 3, 2013	The Hunger Games: Catching Fire	1,425,123	
49	December 10, 2013	Frozen	862,291	
50	December 17, 2013	The Hobbit: The Desolation of Smaug	1,619,507	
51	December 24, 2013	The Hobbit: The Desolation of Smaug	1,085,783	
52	December 31, 2013	The Hobbit: The Desolation of Smaug	1,066,280	

== Highest-grossing French productions ==
This is a list of domestic films that registered over one million admissions in 2013.

Rank	Original title	English title	Tickets sold	Distributor
1	Les Profs	Serial Teachers	3,957,176	UGC Distribution
2	Belle et Sébastien	Belle and Sebastian	2,991,617	Gaumont
3	Les Garçons et Guillaume, à table !	Me, Myself and Mum	2,896,319	Gaumont
4	9 mois ferme	9 Month Stretch	2,070,776	Wild Bunch
5	Boule et Bill	Boule & Bill	2,007,296	StudioCanal
6	Jappeloup	Jappeloup	1,822,148	Pathé
7	Eyjafjallajökull	Eyjafjallajökull	1,822,148	Mars Distribution
8	Les Gamins	The Brats	1,787,433	Gaumont
9	Casse-tête chinois	Chinese Puzzle	1,536,489	StudioCanal
10	Sur le chemin de l'école	On the Way to School	1,402,496	StudioCanal
11	20 ans d'écart	It Boy	1,400,146	EuropaCorp. Distribution
12	La Cage Dorée	The Gilded Cage	1,232,519	Pathé
13	Alceste à bicyclette	Bicycling with Molière	1,169,338	Pathé
14	Vive la France	Vive la France	1,107,835	Gaumont
15	Möbius	Möbius	1,095,433	EuropaCorp. Distribution
16	La Vie d'Adèle	Blue Is the Warmest Colour	1,036,811	Wild Bunch
17	Paulette	Paulette	1,035,495	Gaumont

== See also ==
- List of French films of 2013
- Lists of highest-grossing films in France
