= Frank Hoffmann (actor) =

German-Austrian actor (1938–2022)

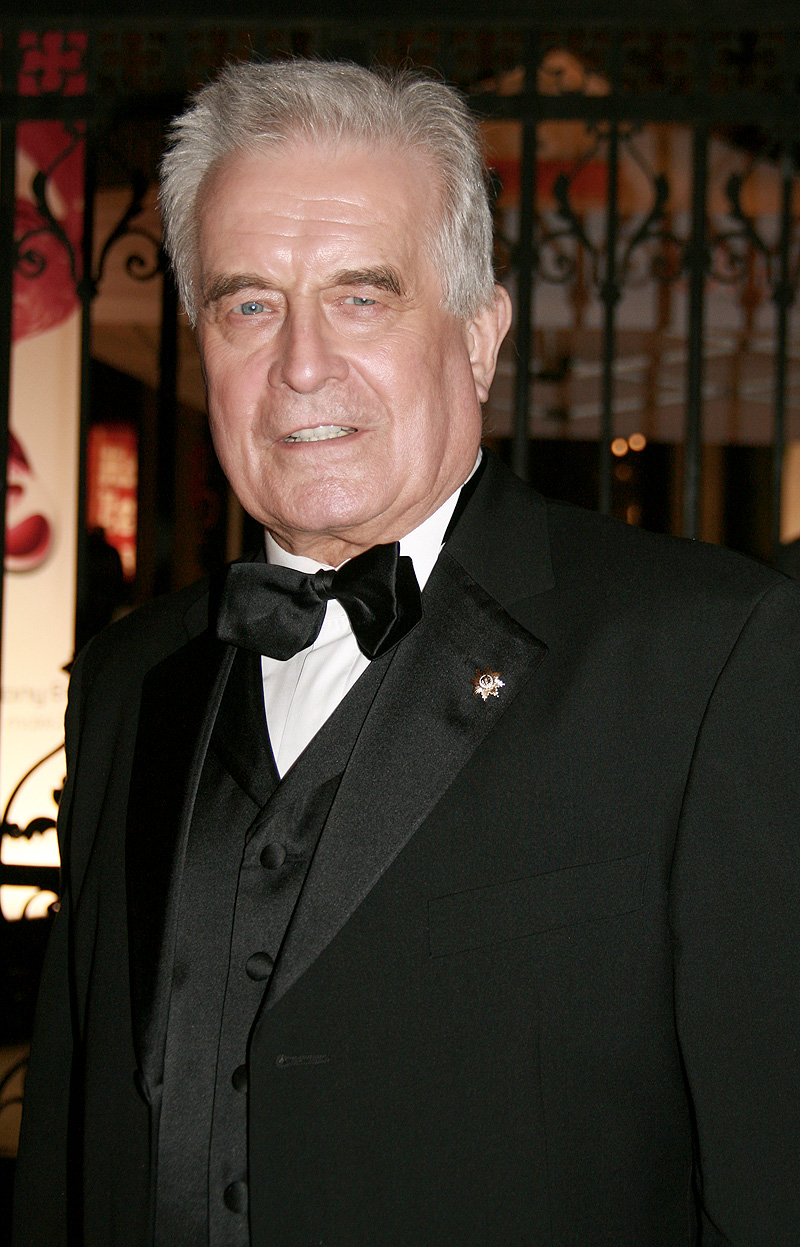
- Hoffmann at the Vienna Film Ball in 2010
- Born: 16 July 1938; Radebeul, Saxony, Germany
- Died: 4 June 2022 (aged 83); Großmürbisch, Burgenland
- Occupation: Actor
- Awards: Gold Decoration for Services to the City of Vienna; Austrian Decoration for Science and Art

Frank Hoffmann (16 July 1938 – 4 June 2022) was a German-Austrian actor.

== Life and work ==
Frank Hoffmann was born in Radebeul, near Dresden, in Germany. He trained at the Otto-Falckenberg-Schule in Munich. His first acting roles were in Heidelberg, Graz, Dortmund, Cologne and Basel, where he worked at the Theater Basel. In 1967, he was a member of the ensemble at the Burgtheater in Vienna. This was where he met his future wife, Else Ludwig, who had been an actor there since 1965. He then featured in a number of films and tv programmes, including alongside Jean-Paul Belmondo in The Ace of Aces, alongside Senta Berger in Die Nacht der Nächte, Susi Nicoletti in the stage drama Heldenplatz and in Bella Ciao, directed by Xaver Schwarzenberger.

Between 1975 and 1994, Hoffmann directed and presented the tv show Trailer, shown on ORF. With his distinctive voice, Frank Hoffmann also featured in a number of radio adverts and on radio shows. In 2008, he was awarded the Golden Decoration of Honor of the City of Vienna. In 2010, he was an ambassador of the Austrian Federal Ministry of Social Affairs and Labor in the "International Year for Combating Poverty and Social Exclusion". In 2011, he was Ambassador of the Austrian Federal Ministry of Social Affairs and Labor in the "International Year of Volunteers". Since January 2013, he has been a film expert for the private television channel ServusTV in the program Lichtspiele - Das Filmmagazin.

Hoffmann married Else Ludwig in 1966 and had two daughters. In the last twenty years of his life, Hoffmann lived in a farmhouse in Großmürbisch in Burgenland, where he died on 4 June 2022 at the age of 83.

== Decorations and awards ==
- 1986: Honorary Member of the World Wide Fund for Nature
- 1986 Austrian Cross of Honour for Science and Art
- 1999: Grand Decoration of Burgenland
- 2004: State cultural award Burgenland
- 2008: Gold Medal of the City of Vienna
- 27 November 2008: Title of Professor
