= The Cow and I =

1959 film

La Vache et le Prisonnier
- Directed by: Henri Verneuil
- Written by: Jacques Antoine
- Based on: Une histoire vraie by Jacques Antoine
- Starring: Fernandel
- Cinematography: Roger Hubert
- Edited by: Jacques Cuenet
- Music by: Paul Durand
- Distributed by: Pathé Consortium Cinéma
- Release date: 16 December 1959 (France)
- Running time: 118 minutes
- Countries: France; Italy
- Language: French

La Vache et le Prisonnier (English version: "The Cow and I") is a French-Italian tragicomedy film from 1959, starring Fernandel and directed by Henri Verneuil, that is based on Jacques Antoine's 1945 novel, Une histoire vraie (A True Story). It tells the story of a French prisoner of war in World War II forced to work on a farm in Germany who decides to escape by walking away with a cow he calls Marguerite (Daisy in English).

It was the most successful film in France in 1959, with over 8 million seats sold.

== Plot ==
Charles Bailly, a French prisoner of war in Germany in the summer of 1943, decides to escape from the farm where he is forced to work and go home to France. Observing that a man with a cow and a milk pail passes unnoticed in the Bavarian countryside, his plan is to take one (whom he names Marguerite) and to walk with her to Stuttgart, where he will leave her and hide aboard a train for France.

Their epic journey takes weeks, during which the two meet many people, some sympathetic and some not. They get into many situations, some dangerous and some hilarious. For example, on a narrow pontoon bridge over the Danube, Marguerite will not budge when a company of German soldiers tries to cross.

Reaching Stuttgart, Bailly has to part from Marguerite and jumps on a train. At its first stop in France, he gets off but is challenged by French police. To escape them he jumps on another train, which viewers can see is heading for Stuttgart.

== Cast ==
- Fernandel : Charles Bailly
- René Havard : Bussière, fellow prisoner on the farm
- Bernard Musson : Pommier, fellow prisoner on the farm
- Maurice Nasil : Bertoux, fellow prisoner on the farm
- Albert Rémy : Collinet
- Ellen Schwiers : Josépha, the farmer's daughter
- Ingeborg Schöner : Helga, another farmer's daughter
- Franziska Kinz : Helga's mother
- Pierre-Louis : an escaped prisoner in disguise
- Richard Winckler : another escaped prisoner in disguise
- Benno Hoffmann : a prison guard
- Franz Muxeneder
- Heinrich Gretler
- Marguerite : the cow

== Production ==
The film was shot in black and white, and in 1990 a colorized version was released.

== Reception ==
The film has become a national favourite, being shown often on television. Analysing its enduring popularity, a critic in 2017 wrote that the character created by Fernandel embodies: .. the typical Frenchman, in his stubbornness, resourcefulness and humanity.

== Analysis ==
The film has been described as the first work in French cinema to concern itself with the topic of French prisoners of war in World War II.

== Remake ==
In 2018, Variety reported that an English-language remake would begin development in the fall of that year, with Marc Forster directing, Ewan McGregor starring, and Bill Prady writing.
