= Les Anges gardiens =

- Directed by: Jean-Marie Poiré
- Written by: Christian Clavier; Jean-Marie Poiré
- Produced by: Alain Terzian; Charles Wang
- Starring: Gérard Depardieu; Christian Clavier
- Cinematography: Christophe Beaucarne; Jean-Yves Le Mener; Christophe Legal
- Edited by: Catherine Kelber
- Music by: Eric Lévi
- Production companies: Gaumont; TF1 Films Production; Funny Films; Vaudeville Productions
- Distributed by: Gaumont Buena Vista International
- Release date: 11 October 1995
- Running time: 110 minutes
- Country: France
- Languages: French; English; Cantonese; Italian
- Budget: $18.4 million
- Box office: $39.1 million

Les Anges gardiens (English: "Guardian Angels") is a 1995 French film directed by Jean-Marie Poiré. It was the highest-grossing non-English language film of 1995 with $39.1 million.

== Cast and roles ==
- Gérard Depardieu as Antoine Carco (and his 'guardian angels')
- Christian Clavier as Father Hervé Tarain (and his 'guardian angels')
- Eva Grimaldi as Regina Podium
- Yves Rénier as Yvon Radmilo aka. 'la pince'
- Eva Herzigová as Tchouk Tchouk Nougat
- Jean Champion as Grandfather of Father Tarain
- Anna Gaylor as Grandmother of Father Tarain
- Dominique Marcas as Mother Angelina
- Julien Courbey as Jérôme
- Françoise Bertin as Madame Albert
- François Morel as The steward
- Philippe Nahon as Taxi driver
- Armelle as Nurse
- Darren Shahlavi as Gangster 2
- Mouss Diouf
- Fabienne Chaudat
- Michel Pilorgé

== Reception ==
The film opened at number one at the French box office with a gross of 48.6 million Francs ($9.7 million), the largest opening for a French film in at least the prior five years. It stayed at number one for four weeks.

== See also ==
- List of films about angels
