= La Cuisine au Beurre =

1963 film by Gilles Grangier

La Cuisine au Beurre is a 1963 French comedy film starring Fernandel and Bourvil.

It was one of the most popular films of the year in France.
