= List of 2019 box office number-one films in France =

The following is a list of 2019 box office number-one films in France.

== Number-one films ==
†	This implies the highest-grossing movie of the year.

#	Date	Film	Gross	Notes
1	January 6, 2019	Aquaman	US$5,149,920	
2	January 13, 2019	Creed II	US$5,903,299	
3	January 20, 2019	Glass	US$3,524,507	
4	January 27, 2019	The Mule	US$4,326,409	
5	February 3, 2019	Serial (Bad) Weddings 2	US$14,856,103	
6	February 10, 2019	Serial (Bad) Weddings 2	US$9,572,048	
7	February 17, 2019	Serial (Bad) Weddings 2	US$6,200,692	
8	February 24, 2019	Serial (Bad) Weddings 2	US$4,383,927	
9	March 3, 2019	Serial (Bad) Weddings 2	US$3,241,084	
10	March 10, 2019	Captain Marvel	US$9,093,585	
11	March 17, 2019	Captain Marvel	US$4,661,210	
12	March 24, 2019	Captain Marvel	US$2,475,082	
13	March 31, 2019	Dumbo	US$3,577,811	
14	April 7, 2019	Dumbo	US$2,846,823	
15	April 14, 2019	Tanguy Is Back	US$2,992,504	
16	April 21, 2019	After	US$4,114,974	
17	April 28, 2019	Avengers: Endgame	US$24,971,474	
18	May 5, 2019	Avengers: Endgame	US$13,265,863	
19	May 12, 2019	Avengers: Endgame	US$6,410,037	
20	May 19, 2019	Avengers: Endgame	US$2,596,469	
21	May 26, 2019	Aladdin	US$3,587,004	
22	June 2, 2019	Aladdin	US$3,744,643	
23	June 9, 2019	Dark Phoenix	US$4,235,000	
24	June 16, 2019	Men in Black: International	US$2,269,151	
25	June 23, 2019	Men in Black: International	US$1,227,648	
26	June 30, 2019	Toy Story 4	US$6,224,580	
27	July 7, 2019	Spider-Man: Far From Home	US$8,270,495	
28	July 14, 2019	Spider-Man: Far From Home	US$4,117,554	
29	July 21, 2019	The Lion King †	US$19,313,115	
30	July 28, 2019	The Lion King †	US$14,360,665	
31	August 4, 2019	The Lion King †	US$7,394,640	
32	August 11, 2019	Hobbs & Shaw	US$6,650,497	
33	August 18, 2019	Once Upon a Time in Hollywood	US$7,076,506	
34	August 25, 2019	Once Upon a Time in Hollywood	US$3,112,129	
35	September 1, 2019	La Vie scolaire	US$3,196,359	
36	September 8, 2019	La Vie scolaire	US$2,095,561	
37	September 15, 2019	It Chapter Two	US$4,416,938	
38	September 22, 2019	Ad Astra	US$2,897,319	
39	September 29, 2019	La Vie scolaire	US$2,868,208	
40	October 6, 2019	Gemini Man	US$2,355,639	
41	October 13, 2019	Joker	US$10,490,091	
42	October 20, 2019	Joker	US$7,257,326	
43	October 27, 2019	Joker	US$5,723,045	
44	November 3, 2019	Joker	US$5,433,652	
45	November 10, 2019	La Belle Époque	US$3,029,197	
46	November 17, 2019	An Officer and a Spy	US$2,991,535	
47	November 24, 2019	Frozen 2	US$14,292,448	
48	December 1, 2019	Frozen 2	US$9,674,579	
49	December 8, 2019	Frozen 2	US$6,150,454	
50	December 15, 2019	Jumanji: The Next Level	US$4,030,889	
51	December 22, 2019	Star Wars: The Rise of Skywalker	US$16,482,515	
52	December 29, 2019	Star Wars: The Rise of Skywalker	US$12,756,881	
