= List of 1995 box office number-one films in France =

This is a list of films which have placed number one at the weekly box office in France during 1995. Amounts are in French franc.

== Number one films ==
| † | This implies the highest-grossing movie of the year. |

| # | Week ending | Film | Box office | Notes | Ref |
|---|---|---|---|---|---|
| 1 | 3 January 1995 | The Lion King | 53,380,463 | | |
| 2 | 10 January 1995 | Un indien dans la ville † | 19,322,550 | Un indien dans la ville reached number one in its fourth week of release | |
| 3 | 17 January 1995 | Un indien dans la ville † | 20,372,453 | | |
| 4 | 24 January 1995 | Un indien dans la ville † | 16,049,487 | | |
| 5 | 31 January 1995 | Un indien dans la ville † | 14,046,251 | | |
| 6 | 7 February 1995 | Stargate | 22,177,527 | | |
| 7 | 14 February 1995 | French Twist | 20,943,296 | | |
| 8 | 21 February 1995 | French Twist | 23,784,462 | | |
| 9 | 28 February 1995 | French Twist | 20,880,308 | | |
| 10 | 7 March 1995 | French Twist | 16,589,612 | | |
| 11 | 14 March 1995 | French Twist | 10,942,890 | | |
| 12 | 21 March 1995 | A French Woman | 10,150,420 | | |
| 13 | 28 March 1995 | Les Misérables | 8,510,740 | | |
| 14 | 4 April 1995 | Les Misérables | 6,861,980 | | |
| 15 | 11 April 1995 | One Hundred and One Dalmatians (reissue) | 13,292,044 | | |
| 16 | 18 April 1995 | One Hundred and One Dalmatians (reissue) | 20,685,792 | | |
| 17 | 25 April 1995 | One Hundred and One Dalmatians (reissue) | 25,511,467 | | |
| 18 | 2 May 1995 | One Hundred and One Dalmatians (reissue) | 16,701,216 | | |
| 19 | 9 May 1995 | One Hundred and One Dalmatians (reissue) | 6,270,859 | | |
| 20 | 16 May 1995 | Shallow Grave | 5,325,797 | Shallow Grave reached number one in its fourth week of release | |
| 21 | 23 May 1995 | The City of Lost Children | 9,677,250 | | |
| 22 | 30 May 1995 | The City of Lost Children | 9,406,432 | | |
| 23 | 6 June 1995 | La Haine | 12,534,112 | | |
| 24 | 13 June 1995 | La Haine | 13,248,684 | | |
| 25 | 20 June 1995 | La Haine | 9,460,719 | | |
| 26 | 27 June 1995 | La Haine | 12,480,006 | | |
| 27 | 4 July 1995 | Sleeping Beauty (reissue) | 5,090,228 | | |
| 28 | 11 July 1995 | Bad Boys | 11,778,292 | | |
| 29 | 18 July 1995 | Bad Boys | 8,978,250 | | |
| 30 | 25 July 1995 | Batman Forever | 19,595,246 | | |
| 31 | 1 August 1995 | Batman Forever | 11,327,832 | | |
| 32 | 8 August 1995 | Die Hard with a Vengeance | 35,477,506 | Die Hard with a Vengeance set the record for a summer opening grossing 42 million Franc in its first 8 days | |
| 33 | 15 August 1995 | Die Hard with a Vengeance | 20,824,265 | | |
| 34 | 22 August 1995 | First Knight | 16,270,485 | | |
| 35 | 29 August 1995 | Die Hard with a Vengeance | 13,521,095 | Die Hard with a Vengeance returned to number one in its fourth week of release | |
| 36 | 5 September 1995 | Die Hard with a Vengeance | 10,990,105 | | |
| 37 | 12 September 1995 | Crimson Tide | 9,388,085 | | |
| 38 | 19 September 1995 | The Bridges of Madison County | 7,995,225 | The Bridges of Madison County reached number one in its second week of release | |
| 39 | 26 September 1995 | The Horseman on the Roof | 21,717,010 | | |
| 40 | 3 October 1995 | The Horseman on the Roof | 18,946,235 | | |
| 41 | 10 October 1995 | The Horseman on the Roof | 14,452,900 | | |
| 42 | 17 October 1995 | Les Anges gardiens | 48,582,835 | | |
| 43 | 24 October 1995 | Les Anges gardiens | 39,357,021 | | |
| 44 | 31 October 1995 | Les Anges gardiens | 40,547,049 | | |
| 45 | 7 November 1995 | Les Anges gardiens | 24,101,361 | | |
| 46 | 14 November 1995 | Apollo 13 | 21,876,437 | | |
| 47 | 21 November 1995 | Apollo 13 | 15,904,454 | | |
| 48 | 29 November 1995 | Pocahontas | 35,098,274 | | |
| 49 | 5 December 1995 | Pocahontas | 27,759,270 | | |
| 50 | 12 December 1995 | Pocahontas | 21,781,865 | | |
| 51 | 19 December 1995 | Pocahontas | 21,400,000 | | |
| 52 | 26 December 1995 | GoldenEye | 38,469,738 | | |

== Highest-grossing films ==
| Rank | Title | Distributor | Admissions | Gross ($m) |
|---|---|---|---|---|
| 1. | Un indien dans la ville | AMLF | 5,616,000 | 33.7 |
| 2. | Les Anges gardiens | Gaumont Buena Vista International (GBVI) | 5,602,000 | 33.6 |
| 3. | Pocahontas | GBVI | 4,695,000 | 28.2 |
| 4. | French Twist | AMLF | 3,981,000 | 23.9 |
| 5. | Die Hard with a Vengeance | GBVI | 3,437,000 | 20.6 |
| 6. | One Hundred and One Dalmatians | GBVI | 3,076,000 | 18.4 |
| 7. | Stargate | AMLF | 2,698,000 | 16.1 |
| 8. | The Lion King | GBVI | 2,654,670 | 15.9 |
| 9. | Élisa | GBVI | 2,482,000 | 14.9 |
| 10. | The Horseman on the Roof | AMLF | 2,469,000 | 14.8 |

== See also ==
- List of French films of 1995
- Lists of box office number-one films

== Chronology ==
| Preceded by 1994 | 1995 |
