= The Sucker =

- Film poster
- Directed by: Gérard Oury
- Written by: Gérard Oury; Marcel Jullian
- Produced by: Robert Dorfmann
- Starring: Louis de Funès; Bourvil; Venantino Venantini
- Cinematography: Henri Decaë
- Edited by: Albert Jurgenson; Laurence Leininger; Étiennette Muse
- Music by: Georges Delerue
- Distributed by: Valoria Films
- Release date: 24 March 1965
- Running time: 111 minutes
- Country: France
- Languages: French; Italian
- Box office: 11,743,525 admissions (France)

The Sucker (French: Le Corniaud, French pronunciation: [lə kɔʁˈnjo]) is a 1965 French, Italian and Spanish comedy film by Gérard Oury starring Louis de Funès, Bourvil and Venantino Venantini. To this day, it remains one of Oury's best-known films.

== Plot ==
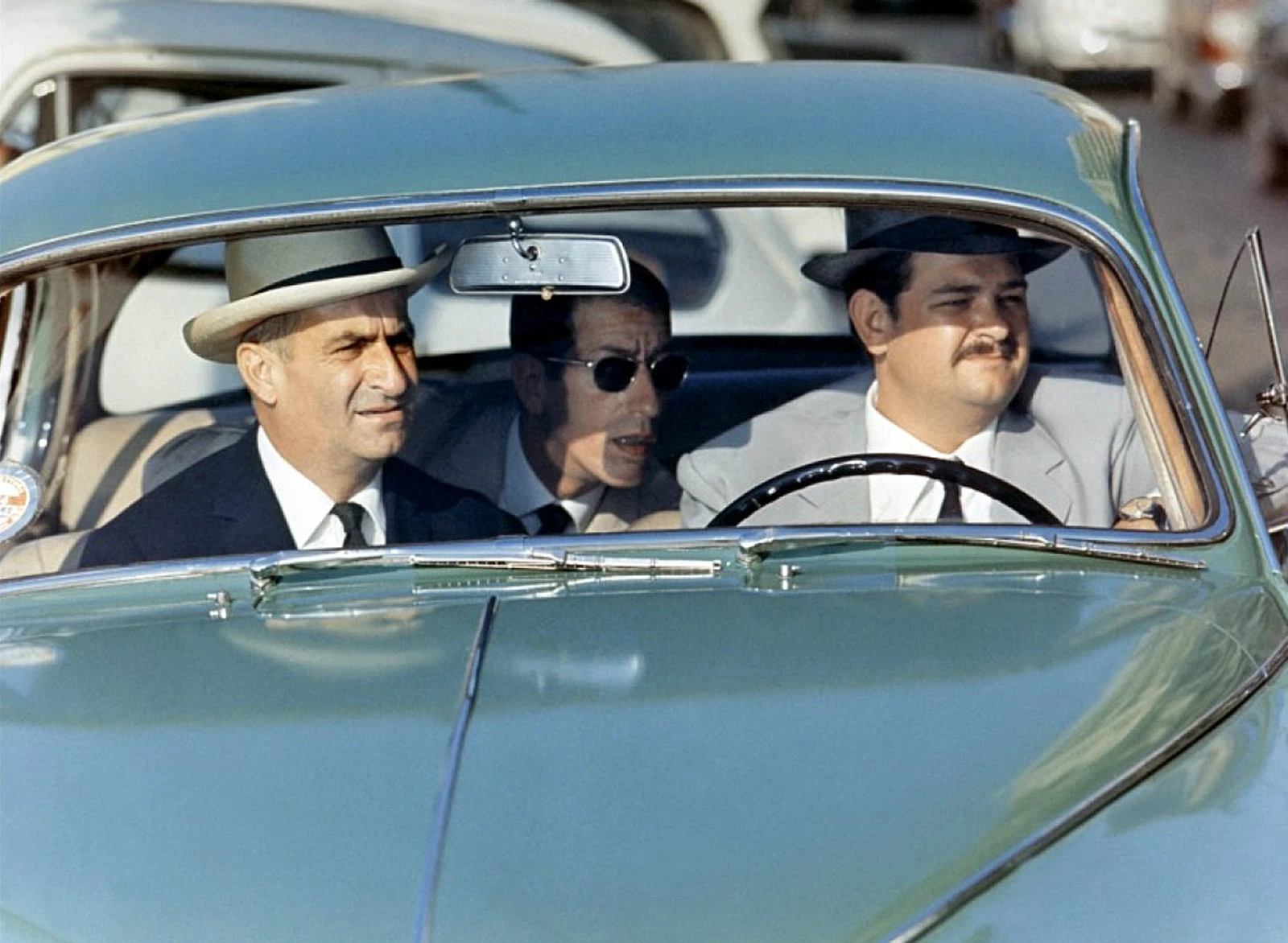
De Funès, Jean Droze and Jacques Ferrière on set in Italy

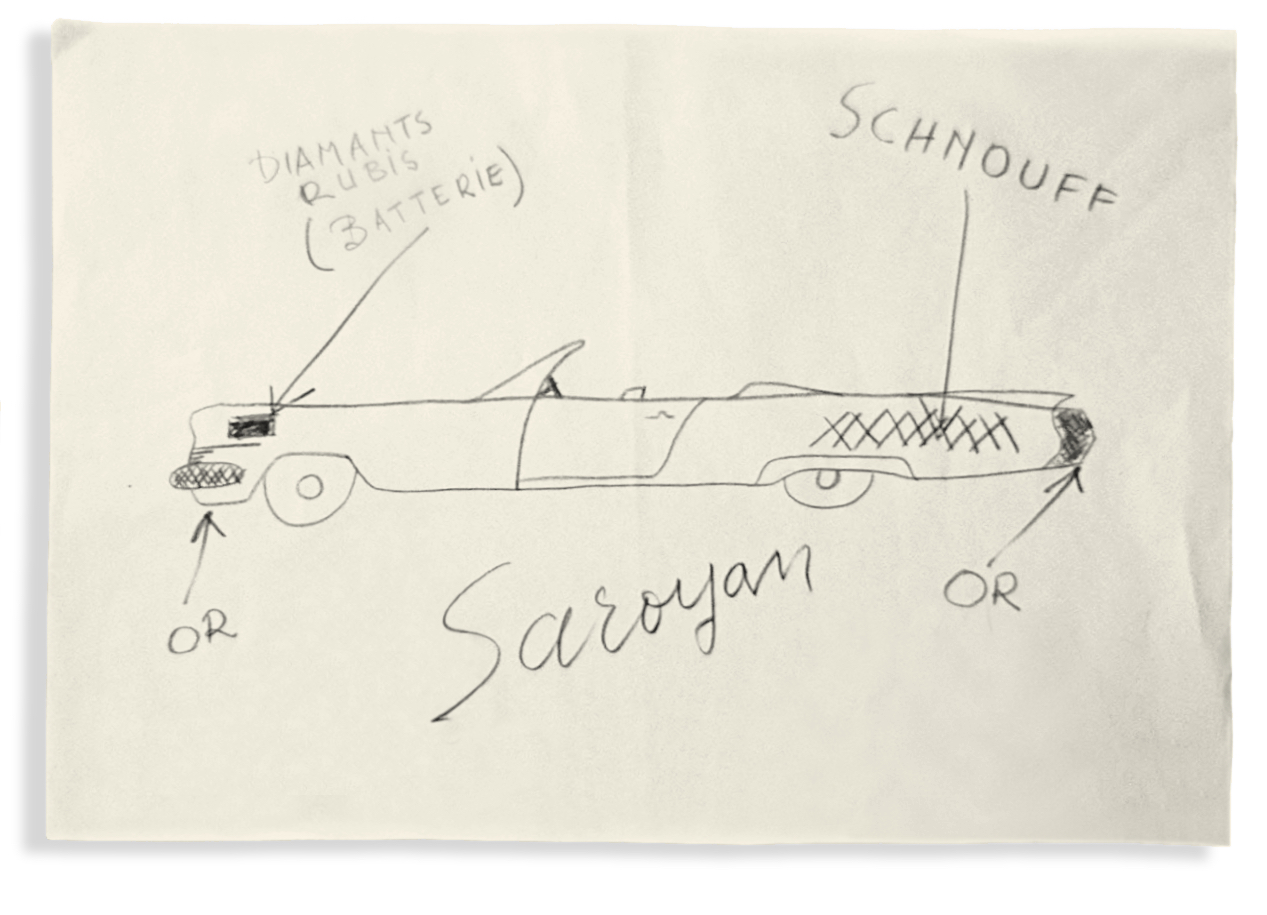
Drawing from the film signed "Saroyan"

Leaving Paris for his summer vacation, the naïve Antoine Maréchal has his 2CV totally wrecked in a collision with the Rolls-Royce of company director Léopold Saroyan. As compensation, Saroyan offers Maréchal the chance to drive a friend's 1964 white Cadillac DeVille convertible from Naples to Bordeaux, all expenses paid. Unknown to Maréchal, Saroyan is the leader of a criminal gang and the Cadillac is filled with heroin, gold and stolen gems including the largest diamond in the world, the Youkounkoun. Maréchal collects the car in Naples and sets on his drive, shadowed both by Saroyan and his associates and by a rival Italian gang whose members are aware of the Cadillac's contents.

After an accident, following which a mechanic finds and removes the gold, Maréchal reaches Rome, where a pretty manicurist called Gina joins him. She only does it to make her fiancé jealous and then finds a pretty German hitchhiker called Ursula to accompany him. At night the Italian gang steal the Cadillac but are chased by Saroyan's gang, who capture it after a gun battle in which all the heroin is destroyed and return it to Maréchal. Mickey, one of the Italian crooks, seduces Ursula, who invites him to join them. In an isolated spot, Mickey then tries to kill Maréchal, but Ursula sabotages the battery so that he cannot make off with the car and saves Maréchal's life. Left on his own, Maréchal gets a new battery and throws the ruined one, full of diamonds, into the sea.

Crossing the border into France at Menton, Maréchal sees Saroyan's car being stripped by the police. He realises that the car they want must be the one he is driving and that Saroyan must be crooked. Heading for Carcassonne, he rings an old friend who is now chief of police there. Still tracked by Saroyan and the Italians, he lures them all into the unmarked side door of the police station, where they are arrested. Taking the Cadillac on the last leg to Bordeaux, he has another accident with Saroyan's prison transport, in which he finds the Youkounkoun and can thus expect a reward of 100 million francs coming to him.

As they are being ferried to police headquarters inside the wrecked Cadillac, Maréchal and Saroyan begin to strike up a friendship over this misadventure.

== Cast ==
- Bourvil as Antoine Maréchal
- Louis de Funès as Léopold Saroyan
- Venantino Venantini as Mickey
- Henri Génès as Martial
- Beba Lončar as Ursula
- Nino Vingelli as Tagliella
- Alida Chelli as Gina
- Lando Buzzanca as Lino
- Jacques Ferrière as a gangster, Saroyan's driver
- Jean Droze as a gangster, Saroyan's accomplice
- Jack Ary as a customs officer
- Pierre Roussel as Mario Costa

== Filming locations ==
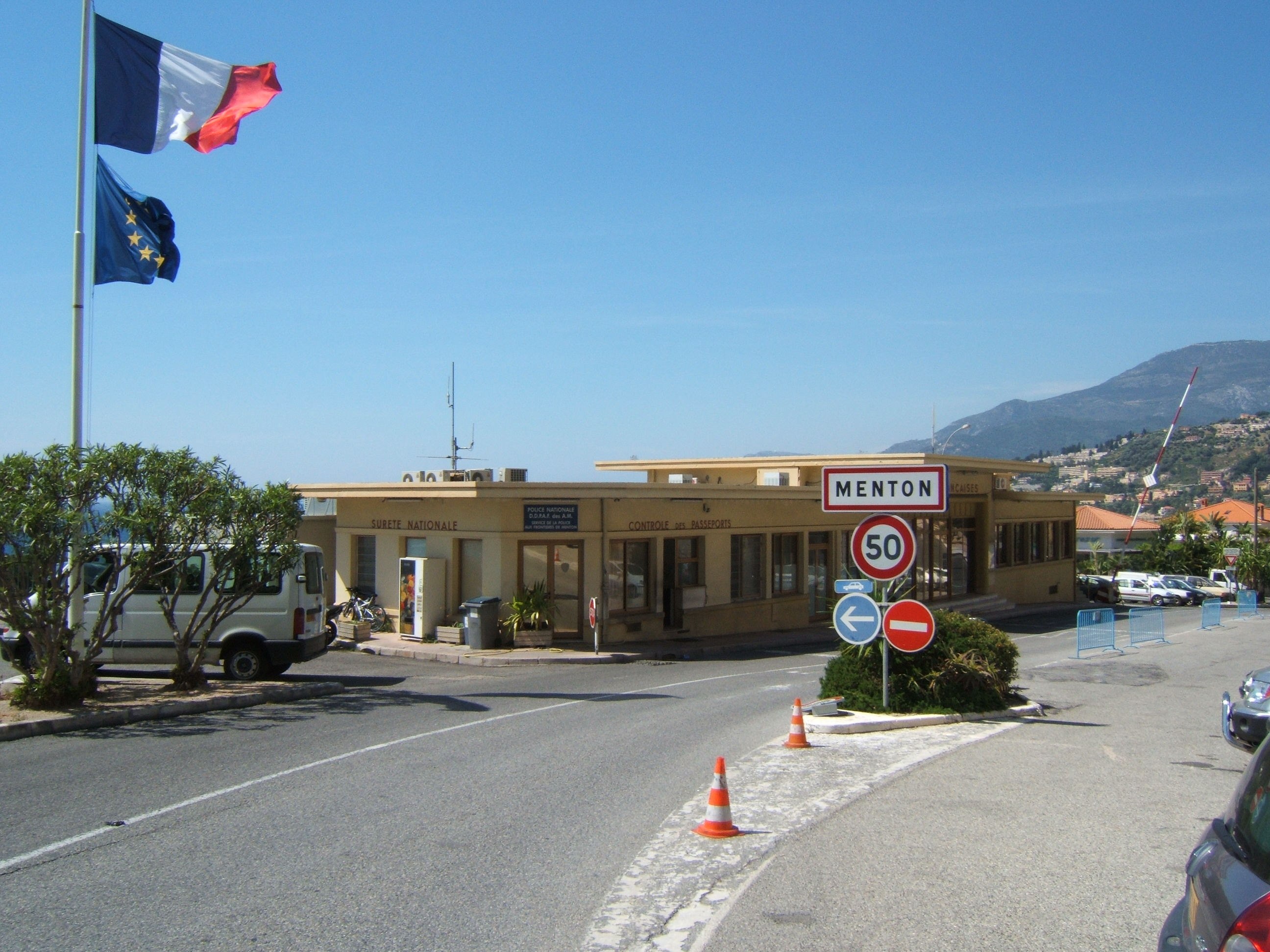
The border post at Menton

The film was shot in France and Italy:

- In France, Bordeaux, Carcassonne, Menton, Paris, Versailles, La Motte and Saint-Raphaël.
- In Italy, Naples, Rome, Tivoli, Sutri, San Gimignano and Pisa.

== Reception ==
It was the most popular film at the French box office in 1965. As of 2019, it is still one of the 25 most watched films in France along with La Grande Vadrouille, another Oury–De Funès–Bourvil collaboration.

The film was entered into the 4th Moscow International Film Festival where it won Best Scenario while Bourvil won a "Special Diploma".

The film also won the yearly award for the foreign film that best served the beauty of Italy, given by ENIT.

== See also ==
- Louis de Funès filmography

== Bibliography ==
- Oury, Gérard (2001). Ma grande vadrouille (in French). Plon. ISBN 978-2-259-19352-8.
