= List of 1994 box office number-one films in France =

This is a list of films which have placed number one at the weekly box office in France during 1994. Amounts are in French franc.

== Number one films ==
†	This implies the highest-grossing movie of the year.

#	Week ending	Film	Box office	Notes	Ref
1	4 January 1994	Aladdin	€33,256,601		
2	11 January 1994	Aladdin	€11,070,441		
3	18 January 1994	Striking Distance	€12,733,740		
4	24 January 1994	Striking Distance	€8,387,387		
5	1 February 1994	La Vengeance d'une blonde	€17,146,615		
6	8 February 1994	Demolition Man	€19,830,248		
7	15 February 1994	Mrs. Doubtfire	€28,556,142		
8	22 February 1994	Mrs. Doubtfire	€32,405,998		
9	1 March 1994	Mrs. Doubtfire	€29,855,100		
10	8 March 1994	Mrs. Doubtfire	€22,134,076		
11	15 March 1994	La Cité de la peur	€17,991,438		
12	22 March 1994	La Cité de la peur	€14,561,463		
13	29 March 1994	Schindler's List	€9,967,393	Schindler's List reached number one in its fourth week of release	
14	5 April 1994	The Aristocats (reissue)	€10,969,731		
15	12 April 1994	The Aristocats (reissue)	€11,256,292		
16	19 April 1994	The Aristocats (reissue)	€13,046,062		
17	26 April 1994	The Aristocats (reissue)	€11,986,988		
18	3 May 1994	Cool Runnings	€8,614,369	Cool Runnings reached number one in its third week of release	
19	10 May 1994	Four Weddings and a Funeral	€11,688,868	Four Weddings and a Funeral reached number one in its second week of release	
20	17 May 1994	Four Weddings and a Funeral	€30,517,396		
21	24 May 1994	La Reine Margot	€15,904,116	La Reine Margot reached number one in its second week of release	
22	31 May 1994	Grosse Fatigue	€12,680,563	Grosse Fatigue reached number one in its second week of release	
23	7 June 1994	Grosse Fatigue	€10,404,610		
24	14 June 1994	Four Weddings and a Funeral	€9,455,180	Four Weddings and a Funeral returned to number one in its seventh week of release	
25	21 June 1994	Four Weddings and a Funeral	€6,600,000		
26	28 June 1994	Four Weddings and a Funeral	TBD		
27	5 July 1994	Four Weddings and a Funeral	€7,809,901		
28	12 July 1994	Four Weddings and a Funeral	€7,627,484		
29	19 July 1994	Four Weddings and a Funeral	€6,595,533		
30	26 July 1994	Four Weddings and a Funeral	€6,093,900		
31	2 August 1994	Four Weddings and a Funeral	€6,128,460		
32	9 August 1994	Maverick	€12,788,080		
33	16 August 1994	Maverick	€9,391,589		
34	23 August 1994	Beverly Hills Cop III	€23,678,248		
35	30 August 1994	Speed	€23,759,153		
36	6 September 1994	Speed	€16,663,878		
37	13 September 1994	Speed	€10,648,707		
38	20 September 1994	Léon: The Professional	€26,892,995		
39	27 September 1994	Léon: The Professional	€22,848,374		
40	4 October 1994	Léon: The Professional	€17,375,382		
41	11 October 1994	Forrest Gump	€17,454,840		
42	18 October 1994	True Lies	€20,658,006		
43	25 October 1994	True Lies	€14,115,765		
44	1 November 1994	The Mask	€29,571,881		
45	8 November 1994	The Mask	€25,758,606		
46	15 November 1994	The Specialist	€20,144,082		
47	22 November 1994	The Specialist	€10,169,555		
48	29 November 1994	The Lion King †	€26,084,264	The Lion King reached number one in its third week of release	
49	6 December 1994	The Lion King †	€44,804,621		
50	13 December 1994	The Lion King †	€38,129,972		
51	20 December 1994	The Lion King †	€49,289,353		
52	27 December 1994	The Lion King †	€53,621,908		

== Highest-grossing films ==
Rank	Title	Distributor	Admissions	Gross ($m)
1.	The Lion King	Gaumont Buena Vista International (GBVI)	7,523,000	45.1
2.	Four Weddings and a Funeral	Pan-Européenne	5,317,000	31.9
3.	Mrs. Doubtfire	Fox	5,024,000	30.1
4.	Léon: The Professional	GBVI	3,350,000	20.1
5.	The Mask	AMLF	2,930,000	17.6
6.	Philadelphia	Columbia Pictures	2,725,000	16.4
7.	Schindler's List	UIP	2,638,000	15.8
8.	Forrest Gump	UIP	2,637,000	15.8
9.	Cool Runnings	GBVI	2,542,000	15.3
10.	Speed	Fox	2,364,000	14.2

== See also ==
- List of French films of 1994
- Lists of box office number-one films

Preceded by 1993	1994	Succeeded by 1995
