= La Grande Vadrouille =

1966 French-British film by Gérard Oury

- French theatrical release poster
- Directed by: Gérard Oury
- Written by: Marcel Jullian; Gérard Oury; Danièle Thompson; Georges Tabet; André Tabet
- Produced by: Robert Dorfmann
- Starring: Bourvil; Louis de Funès; Claudio Brook; Terry-Thomas
- Cinematography: André Domage; Alain Douarinou; Claude Renoir
- Edited by: Albert Jurgenson
- Music by: Georges Auric; Hector Berlioz
- Production companies: Les Films Corona; Rank Organisation; La Magie du Cinéma
- Distributed by: Valoria Films (France); Rank Film Distributors (UK)
- Release dates: 8 December 1966 (France); 5 May 1968 (UK)
- Running time: 132 minutes
- Countries: France; United Kingdom
- Languages: French; English; German
- Budget: $2.3 million
- Box office: $33 million (France)

La Grande Vadrouille (French pronunciation: [la ɡʁɑ̃d vadʁuj]; transl. "The Great Stroll"), originally released in the United Kingdom as Don't Look Now... We're Being Shot At!, is a 1966 French-British comedy film directed by Gérard Oury about French civilians who, in 1942, help the crew of a Royal Air Force bomber that has been shot down over Paris make their way through German-occupied France to safe territory.

== Plot ==
On a summer day in 1942, a lost RAF bomber strays over Paris and is shot down by German flak. After agreeing to rendezvous in the hammam at the Grand Mosque of Paris, the crew parachute out, but only three evade capture. Sir Reginald lands in the Vincennes Zoo and, given civilian clothes by a friendly zookeeper, heads for the baths. Peter Cunningham lands on the platform of a house painter, Augustin Bouvet, from where they escape the Germans and are hidden by a puppet show operator, Juliette; Augustin goes to the baths on Cunningham's behalf. Alan MacIntosh lands on the Opéra Garnier, where he is reluctantly assisted by the chief conductor, Stanislas Lefort, who goes to the baths for him. All the while, the German military under Major Achbach furiously pursues the three and their helpers.

Following the rendezvous at the bath, Lefort leaves Reginald and Bouvet to arrange their pickup of MacIntosh, but in the meantime Achbach has discovered Lefort's connection with the fugitive aviators and takes him prisoner as he returns to the opera. That evening, Reginald and Bouvet, wearing stolen German uniforms, arrive to fetch MacIntosh, and in the confusion of a bombing attempt against a German SS commander, the three of them and Lefort are aided in their escape by Résistance members among the opera staff. However, they miss the train that Juliette and Peter are taking to Meursault, from where they can cross the line of demarcation to the French Free Zone. Due to a blunder, Peter is discovered, arrested, and brought to German headquarters in Meursault.

After getting out of Paris, Reginald, Lefort, Bouvet, and MacIntosh encounter Sister Marie-Odile, a nun whose order is secretly assisting the Résistance. Bouvet and Lefort are sent ahead to Meursault to a hotel owned by Juliette's aunt, but there they almost run into Achbach, who has traveled there to interrogate Cunningham. Disguised as a Feldgendarmerie patrol, they are supposed to make their way across the demarcation line the next morning, but are unmasked and brought back to Meursault. Reginald and MacIntosh are meant to be smuggled separately across the line by Marie-Odile, hidden in two wine casks, but due to a miscommunication, their casks are instead diverted into the cellar of the Meursault headquarters.

After discovering their friends' presence in the building, Reginald and MacIntosh set a fire and use the ensuing confusion to escape with them. With Marie-Odile driving a horse wagon, the fugitives make their way to a shuttered gliding club, where they intend to use the gliders to reach the nearby Free Zone. Closely pursued by Achbach, they manage to take off just in time, and a last-ditch attempt to bring them down with machine-gun fire is accidentally foiled by a cross-eyed soldier, allowing them to fly to safety.

== Cast ==
- André Bourvil as Augustin Bouvet
- Louis de Funès as Stanislas Lefort
- Terry-Thomas as Sir Reginald ("Big Moustache")
- Claudio Brook as Peter Cunningham
- Mike Marshall as Alan MacIntosh
- Marie Dubois as Juliette
- Pierre Bertin as Juliette's grandfather
- Andréa Parisy as Sister Marie-Odile
- Mary Marquet as The Mother Superior
- Benno Sterzenbach as Major Achbach
- Colette Brosset as Madame Germaine, hotel manager
- Michel Modo as cross-eyed German soldier
- Hans Meyer as Obergruppenführer S.S. Otto Weber
- Henri Génès as the zoo keeper
- Jacques Bodoin as Méphisto
- Guy Grosso as a musician
- Jean Droze as a musician
- Helmuth Schneider as German officer on train
- Sieghardt Rupp as Leutnant Stürmer
- Paul Préboist as a fisherman

== Production ==
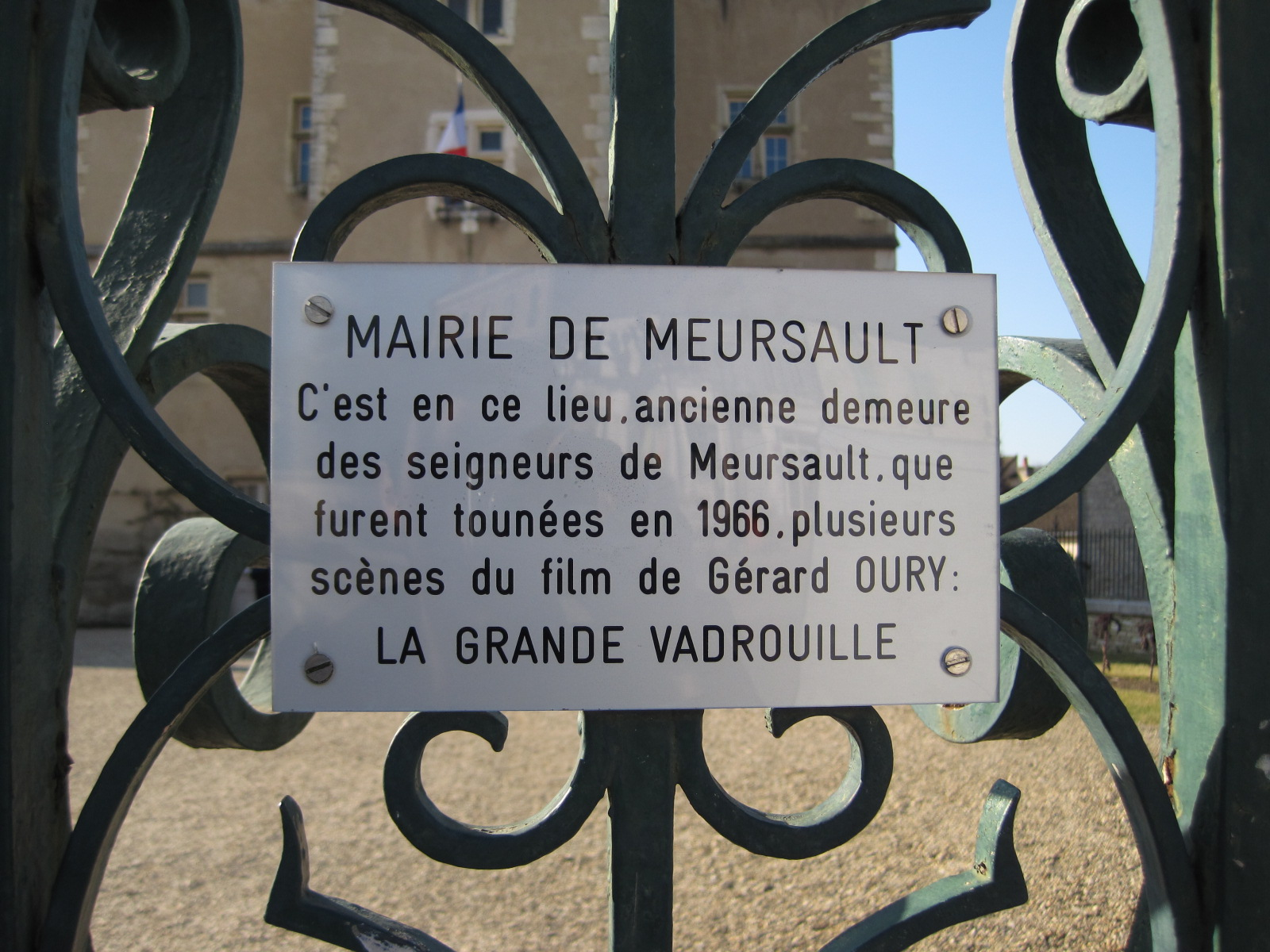
Plaque in Meursault commemorating the filming of La Grande Vadrouille

The film was made by the same team (Oury, Bourvil and de Funès) who did the enormously successful The Sucker (1965). It was shot at the Billancourt Studios in Paris with extensive location shooting around France. The film's sets were designed by the art director Jean André.

== Release ==
The film was distributed in the U.S. by Buena Vista Distribution and had its U.S. premiere at the Festival Theater in New York City on February 16, 1969.

== Reception ==
The film was the most popular of 1966 at the French box office with admissions of 17,275,169 and a gross of $32,994,000. This was almost twice as much as the second most popular, Dr Zhivago, which had 9,816,305 admissions and a gross of $16,536,000.

La Grande Vadrouille remained the most successful French film in France for over forty years, and is still the fifth most successful film ever in France (on the basis of admissions), of any nationality, behind the 1997 version of Titanic, French hits Bienvenue chez les Ch'tis (2008) and Intouchables (2011), which were seen by over 19,000,000 cinemagoers, and Snow White and the Seven Dwarfs.

== Legacy ==
- A specific scene in the film where several dozen German officers of many branches hop around in circles around tables, riding chairs and singing the folk song "Ein Jäger aus Kurpfalz", has become a lesser-known meme, paired with the Yeah Yeah Yeahs' song "Heads Will Roll".
- The film is featured in the 2018 film Roma.

== See also ==
- The Sucker (Le Corniaud)
