= Un indien dans la ville =

- Theatrical release poster
- Directed by: Hervé Palud
- Written by: Hervé Palud; Philippe Bruneau; Thierry Lhermitte
- Produced by: Thierry Lhermitte; Louis Becker
- Starring: Thierry Lhermitte; Patrick Timsit; Ludwig Briand; Miou-Miou; Arielle Dombasle; Jackie Berroyer
- Cinematography: Fabio Conversi
- Edited by: Roland Baubeau
- Music by: Tonton David; Manu Katché; Geoffrey Oryema
- Production company: Canal+
- Distributed by: AMLF
- Release date: 4 December 1994 (France)
- Running time: 90 minutes
- Country: France
- Language: French
- Budget: $5.3 million
- Box office: $70.5 million

Un indien dans la ville (An Indian in the city) is a 1994 French film directed by Hervé Palud. The film had a limited English language release under the title Little Indian, Big City. The film was a box office success, grossing $70.5 million worldwide against a production budget of $5.3 million. Though in the United States, it received negative reviews from American critics and grossed just under $600,000.

Un indien dans la ville was later adapted for an American audience under the title Jungle 2 Jungle (1997), set in Manhattan and starring Tim Allen and Martin Short. A tie-in video game for the Game Boy was released only in France.

== Plot summary ==
Steph, a commodities broker living in Paris, wants a divorce from his wife Patricia to marry another woman: Charlotte. However, Patricia has been living among the French Guiana Amazonas Indians for the past 13 years, so Steph travels to the Indian village to meet her and ask her to sign the divorce papers.

When they meet, Patricia tells Steph that they have a teenage son, Mimi-Siku, who has been raised as an Amazonian Indian. Patricia tells Steph she will not sign the divorce papers unless Steph takes Mimi-Siku on a visit to Paris, which he agrees to. In Paris, Mimi-Siku meets the children of Steph's colleague Richard and falls in love with his daughter Sophie.

== Cast ==
| Character | Original | English |
|---|---|---|
| Stéphane Marchadot | Thierry Lhermitte | Cam Clarke |

- Patrick Timsit as Richard Montignac
- Ludwig Briand as Mimi-Siku
- Miou-Miou as Patricia Marchadot
- Arielle Dombasle as Charlotte
- Sonia Vollereaux as Marie Montignac
- Jackie Berroyer as Lawyer Joanovici
- Marc de Jonge as Rossberg
- Louba Guertchikoff as Mrs. Godette
- Philippe Bruneau as Mr. Maréchal
- Dominique Besnehard as Maître Dong
- Cheik Doukouré as Mr. Bonaventure
- Marie-Charlotte Leclaire as Rossberg's Secretary
- Vladimir Kotlyarov as Pavel Kuсhnukov
- Olga Jiroušková as Sonia Kuchnukova
- Chick Ortega as Russian
- Paco Portero as The Snake Man
- Sonia Lezinska as Stewardess
- Marc Brunet as Policeman
- Olivier Hémon as Policeman
- Thierry Desroses as Customs Officer
- Katja Weitzenböck as Miss Van Hodden
- Pauline Pinsolle as Sophie Montignac
- Stanley Zana as Jonathan Montignac
- Gaston Dolle as Benjamin

== Production ==
Part of Un indien dans la ville was shot in Miami, Florida, United States.

== Release ==
Un indien dans la ville opened in France on 14 December 1994. Shortly after its release in France, Disney saw this film as a possibility to attract a family audience in the United States and considered giving it a limited release in select cities. Before releasing it in select cities, Disney decided to release it under their Touchstone Pictures label as they felt this film had some mature themes for an ordinary Disney film.

As opposed to releasing it in the United States with subtitles leaving the original French dialogue in, Disney hired many cartoon voice-over actors to dub the original French dialogue out and substitute it with an English language format. They also gave the film an English name, Little Indian, Big City. Under its new Americanized title and language dubbing, Touchstone released it to a select American audience on March 22, 1996.

== Reception ==
=== Box office ===
Un indien dans la ville grossed 21 million Franc ($3.9 million) in its opening week in France, finishing second behind The Lion King. It remained in second place for two more weeks before moving to number one for four weeks, grossing $35 million in its first 9 weeks and being the highest-grossing film of the year.

The film flopped during its American release; the film opened in 545 theaters in the United States, but eventually only grossed $1,029,731 in the US and Canada theatrically.

=== Critical reception ===
Upon its original US release, many American critics had an extremely harsh reaction to the film. Roger Ebert awarded Little Indian, Big City a rare "Zero Stars" rating and called it one of the worst films ever made and that he "detested every moronic minute of it", saying that he was annoyed by the awful dubbing as well as the writing and what he perceived as terrible humor. He ended his original Chicago Sun Times newspaper review by saying "If you under any circumstances see Little Indian, Big City, I will never let you read one of my reviews again". Ebert's colleague Gene Siskel also deplored the film saying that it was likely to be a candidate for the year's (or any year's) worst film. He also said that if the word for the film got big enough in the United States family audiences would have been "hoodwinked into paying to see a totally unprofessional movie." When Siskel and Ebert viewed the film during its original theatrical release, one of the film reels broke out and the third reel of film was missing. A film executive informed Siskel and Ebert that they were allowed to come back the following week and view the particular reel. Siskel and Ebert came back to view the third reel, and by the time they had concluded viewing the whole film Siskel was quoted as saying, "If it was the legendary missing footage from The Magnificent Ambersons, this movie would still suck." Both Siskel and Ebert later went on to claim this as one of the worst motion pictures they had ever seen (though it's not on Ebert's "Most Hated Films" list), and in January 1997, on Siskel and Ebert's "Worst of the Year" program for 1996, Ebert went on to call Little Indian, Big City the second worst film of the year, just behind Mad Dog Time.

Peter Stack of the San Francisco Chronicle said that the dub "lends tackiness to an already inept comedy." A critic from the rival San Francisco Examiner newspaper stated that "the real trouble with this movie is that it isn't even funny. As directed by Herve Palud and written by Palud and Igor Aptekman, it's a feathery thing that does not show off Lhermitte's considerable allure and gifts as a comic. In this movie, he looks like a dope whose mouth is moving in a distinctly French manner, inexplicably spouting the words of some uninspired American goof." Janet Maslin of The New York Times further brutalized the production: "Whatever may have been funny - possibly nothing - about the popular French comedy [...] American audiences can watch it vanish before their eyes. This film has been dubbed into English so dreadfully that it becomes a discordant horror. Though the actors, including Thierry Lhermitte, Arielle Dombasle and Miou Miou, show faint visual signs of gentleness and civility, they now have now become crassly Americanized boors on the film's painful audio track." James Berardinelli opened his review with a paragraph which read, "Little Indian, Big City, the American name given to Herve Palud's 1995 French fish-out-of-water comedy, L'Indian dans la Ville, is easily one of the most tedious viewing experiences of 1996. I came as close to walking out of this movie as anything I have ever watched. No one, no matter how desperate they are for family entertainment, should be subjected to the indignity of sitting through this ninety-minute excuse for a motion picture."

As of today, Rotten Tomatoes gives this film a score of 13% based on 8 reviews.

=== Home media ===
It was later released on home video under the VHS format in early 1997 and was re-issued one other time on VHS in mid-1998. The film has not been released on DVD, Blu-ray or any other video formats in the United States.

== Comic book adaptation ==
Un indien dans la ville was also adapted into a comic book by Vincent Deporter and his wife Judith Rucar.

- Title MIMI SIKU - UN INDIEN DANS LA VILLE
- Author Hervé Palud - Vincent Deporter - Judith Rucar
- Publisher Glénat, 1994
- ISBN 2-7234-1831-6, ISBN 978-2-7234-1831-7
