= The Brain (1969 film) =

- Original film poster
- Directed by: Gérard Oury
- Written by: Gérard Oury; Marcel Jullian; Danièle Thompson
- Produced by: Alain Poiré
- Starring: Jean-Paul Belmondo; Bourvil; David Niven; Eli Wallach; Silvia Monti
- Cinematography: Wladimir Ivanov
- Edited by: Albert Jurgenson
- Music by: Georges Delerue
- Production company: Gaumont
- Distributed by: Gaumont Distribution
- Release date: 7 March 1969 (France)
- Running time: 115 minutes
- Countries: France; Italy
- Languages: French; English
- Budget: $3.6 million
- Box office: $41.6 million

The Brain (French: Le Cerveau) is a 1969 French comedy film directed by Gérard Oury, about a second train robbery by the brain behind the Great Train Robbery of 1963. It stars Jean-Paul Belmondo and Bourvil as a pair of French petty crooks, David Niven as a British Army officer who is secretly a criminal mastermind and Eli Wallach as a Sicilian mafioso.

== Plot ==
Arthur, due for release from prison in four days' time, escapes to join his accomplice Anatole in robbing a night train carrying millions in cash from Paris to Brussels. The money belongs to NATO and in charge of its transit is Colonel Matthews, nicknamed 'The Brain' and the unknown mastermind behind the Great Train Robbery.

In his plans for a repeat exploit, Matthews recruits a mafioso called Scannapieco to launder the money for a small percentage. Visiting the Sicilian's villa outside Palermo, he catches the eye of the mafioso's sister Sofia, who resolves to give him her virginity. This infuriates her brother, who considers his honour impugned and resolves that instead of a contemptible percentage he will take all the money himself.

The train sets off with the money, with Arthur and Anatole disguised as railwaymen. Making a hole into the armour of the secure coach, they drop stink bombs inside, which causes the guards to open the door. Suddenly, the guards are incapacitated with gas, and two explosions free the couplings of the coach - unbeknownst to Anatole and Arthur, the gas and explosives were planted by Colonel Matthews as part of his plan. When the coach has rolled to a halt, Anatole and Arthur throw the bags of cash down the embankment. However, it is the precise spot where Colonel Matthews' team, disguised as firemen, are waiting. They scoop up the bags and make off with sirens blaring, leaving Arthur and Anatole to walk back to Paris penniless.

The firemen do not get far because they run into a roadblock, where the police reclaim the money and arrest Matthews. In fact, they are not police but disguised mafiosi led by Scannapieco, whose plan is to smuggle the money out of France in a replica of the Statue of Liberty. Hijacking a DS19, Arthur and Anatole give chase. Also in the chase at the wheel of a BMW 2000 coupé is Sofia, who has freed Matthews and locked her brother in a cabin trunk. All three groups of villains are pursued by the police, ending up on the dockside at Le Havre.

As the Statue of Liberty is hoisted aboard the passenger liner SS France, Arthur climbs into it and finds the money, which falls in a shower of banknotes over the crowds on the quay. The film ends on the ship as it enters New York Harbor, where Matthews lets Arthur and Anatole into the secret of his next operation, which is to hijack a consignment of bullion bound for Fort Knox.

== Music ==
The film's original score was composed by Georges Delerue, while its theme song was performed by The American Breed. The score also includes the song Cento giorni, performed by Caterina Caselli.

== Reception ==
The film was the most popular French movie at the French box office in 1969.
