= François Pignon =

Stock character in French cinema

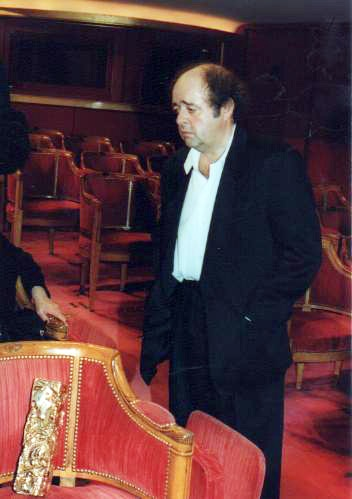
Jacques Villeret, the actor who portrayed François Pignon in The Dinner Game (1998)

François Pignon is the name of several unrelated but thematically similar fictional characters created by French screenwriter Francis Veber for various comedy films and theatre plays between the 1970s and 2010s. Pignon is usually depicted as a foolish yet unknowingly heroic bungler, or a bumbling everyman. The name François Perrin, also recurring in Veber's works, is essentially synonymous with that of Pignon and embodies the same character trope.

== History ==
François Pignon first appeared in Veber's 1971 play Le Contrat, in which he was portrayed by Jean Le Poulain. The play was adapted into a film two years later by Édouard Molinaro under the title of L'Emmerdeur, with Jacques Brel becoming the first actor to assume the role of Pignon in cinema. Ever since, many comedies directed or written by Veber have featured characters with the same name. François Perrin, a variant name for the same archetypal character, first appeared in the 1972 film The Tall Blond Man with One Black Shoe directed by Yves Robert and written by Robert and Veber.

The common theme uniting every François Pignon and Perrin – now part of the folklore of French cinema – is that François constantly finds himself facing circumstances that far exceed his own limited capabilities, while remaining completely oblivious to his predicament. In many cases, he is distinguished by his candour (sometimes verging on idiocy), kindness, and extreme naivety. On his character, Veber wrote (translated from French):

Why did I choose to call him François Pignon? I don't know. And why am I so attached to this character to the point of having him be played by seven different actors? I don't have any explanation either. Nevertheless, Pignon, an imaginary and composite character, has held more of a place in my life than the majority of 'real' people I've met. [...] In order for him to be suicidal in L'Emmerdeur, unlucky in La Chèvre or an idiot in Le Dîner, it was always the same little man in the crowd, plunged into a situation that was beyond his grasp, and which he managed to extricate himself from in complete ignorance.

François Pignon appeared for the second time in cinema in Les Compères (1983), where he was portrayed for the first time by Pierre Richard. From that time onwards, the Pignon variant took precedence over Perrin, the latter not being seen again until Patrick Bruel's performance in Le Jaguar (1996). Veber said that he had fallen "in love" with the name of François Pignon. He wrote (translated from French):

[I have kept] him in everything that I have written since then, whether it be for theatre or cinema. The only exception is Tais-toi !, where Depardieu acts as Quentin, because I was not the author of the original idea. Why Pignon? I don't know. I've often asked myself this question and I've never had a satisfactory response. I believe that it's simply because I like the name and I've ended up considering it a lucky charm.

As a playful nod to the character of François Perrin, the actor Francis Perrin decided to name his own character 'François Veber' in the 1986 film Le Débutant, which he co-wrote with Daniel Janneaule.

== List of François Pignons and François Perrins ==
Shown below are the main productions featuring characters named François Pignon or François Perrin, along with the actors who portrayed them (all works directed by Francis Veber unless indicated otherwise).

=== François Pignon ===
- Le Contrat (1971 theatre play): Jean Le Poulain
- L'Emmerdeur (1973 film directed by Édouard Molinaro, adapted from Le Contrat): Jacques Brel
- Les Compères (1983 film): Pierre Richard
- Les Fugitifs (1986 film): Pierre Richard
- Le Dîner de cons (1993 theatre play): Jacques Villeret (1993), Daniel Hanssens (1993), Dany Boon (2007), Régis Laspalès (2009)
- Le Dîner de cons (1998 film adaptation; The Dinner Game): Jacques Villeret
- Le Placard (2001 film): Daniel Auteuil
- La Doublure (2006 film): Gad Elmaleh
- L'Emmerdeur (2008 film): Patrick Timsit (also on stage in Paris in 2005-2006)
- Cher trésor (2012 theatre play): Gérard Jugnot
- Le Placard (2013 theatrical adaptation): Élie Semoun

=== François Perrin ===
- Le Grand Blond avec une chaussure noire (1972 film directed by Yves Robert; The Tall Blond Man with One Black Shoe): Pierre Richard
- Le Retour du Grand Blond (1974 film directed by Yves Robert; The Return of the Tall Blond Man with One Black Shoe): Pierre Richard
- On aura tout vu (1976 film directed by Georges Lautner): Pierre Richard
- Le Jouet (1976 film): Pierre Richard
- Coup de tête (1979 film directed by Jean-Jacques Annaud): Patrick Dewaere
- Cause toujours... tu m'intéresses ! (1979 film directed by Édouard Molinaro): Jean-Pierre Marielle
- La Chèvre (1981 film): Pierre Richard
- Le Jaguar (1996 film): Patrick Bruel

== Box-office in France ==
Films featuring François Pignon/Perrin that sold one million tickets or more are listed below.

Title	Year	Tickets
Le Dîner de cons	1998	9 247 001
La Chèvre	1981	7 080 137
Le Placard	2001	5 317 828
Les Compères	1983	4 847 229
Les Fugitifs	1986	4 496 827
Le Grand Blond avec une chaussure noire	1972	3 471 266
L'Emmerdeur	1973	3 354 756
La Doublure	2006	3 087 562
Le Jaguar	1996	2 390 580
Le Retour du Grand Blond	1974	2 195 219
Le Jouet	1976	1 249 452

== Hollywood adaptations ==
Several of the French films containing the character of François Pignon (or Perrin) have been remade as Hollywood comedies for English-speaking audiences:

- Buddy Buddy (1981 film by Billy Wilder, based on L'Emmerdeur): the character Victor Clooney takes the role of Pignon, portrayed by Jack Lemmon
- The Toy (1982 film by Richard Donner, based on Le Jouet): the character Jack Brown takes the role of Perrin, portrayed by Richard Pryor
- The Man with One Red Shoe (1985 film by Stan Dragoti, based on Le Grand Blond avec une chaussure noire): the character Richard Drew takes the role of Perrin, portrayed by Tom Hanks
- Three Fugitives (1989 film by Veber himself, based on Les Fugitifs): the character Ned Perry takes the role of Pignon, portrayed by Martin Short
- Pure Luck (1991 film by Nadia Tass, based on La Chèvre): the character Eugene Proctor takes the role of Perrin, portrayed by Martin Short
- Fathers' Day (1997 film by Ivan Reitman, based on Les Compères): the character Dale Putley takes the role of Pignon, portrayed by Robin Williams
- Dinner for Schmucks (2010 film by Jay Roach, based on Le Dîner de cons): the character Barry Speck takes the role of Pignon, portrayed by Steve Carell
