= The Dinner Game =

Le Dîner de Cons
- Theatrical release poster
- Directed by: Francis Veber
- Written by: Francis Veber
- Based on: Le Dîner de Cons by Francis Veber
- Produced by: Alain Poiré
- Starring: Jacques Villeret; Thierry Lhermitte; Francis Huster; Daniel Prévost; Alexandra Vandernoot; Catherine Frot
- Cinematography: Luciano Tovoli
- Edited by: Georges Klotz
- Music by: Vladimir Cosma
- Production companies: Gaumont; EFVE; TF1 Films Production
- Distributed by: Gaumont Buena Vista International
- Release date: 15 April 1998
- Running time: 80 minutes
- Country: France
- Language: French
- Budget: FFR82 million ($14.1 million)
- Box office: $65.4 million

The Dinner Game (French: Le Dîner de Cons, pronounced [lə dine d(ə) kɔ̃]; literally the Dinner of Fools) is a 1998 French comedy film written and directed by Francis Veber, adapted from his play Le Dîner de Cons. It became that year's top-grossing French film at the French box office (second overall behind Titanic) and it has since frequently been described as a cult classic.

== Plot ==
Pierre Brochant, a Parisian publisher, attends a weekly "idiots' dinner", where guests, who are modish, prominent Parisian businessmen, must bring along an oblivious "idiot." The ideal "idiot" is usually one who is obsessed by a ridiculous hobby or theme, whom the other guests can ridicule subtly all evening without the idiot catching on. At the end of the dinner, the evening's "champion idiot" is selected among the businessmen.

With the help of an "idiot scout", Brochant manages to find a "gem", François Pignon, a sprightly employee of the Finance Ministry (which Brochant, a tax cheat, loathes). Pignon has a passion for building matchstick replicas of famous landmarks. Shortly after inviting Pignon to his home, Brochant is suddenly stricken with debilitating back pain while playing golf at his exclusive country club. His wife, Christine, leaves him shortly before Pignon arrives at his apartment, considering his still wanting to go to the "idiots' dinner," an unabashedly cruel aspect of his personality. After Pignon arrives, Brochant initially wants him to leave, but instead becomes reliant on him, because of his immobilizing back injury and his need to resolve his relationship issues.

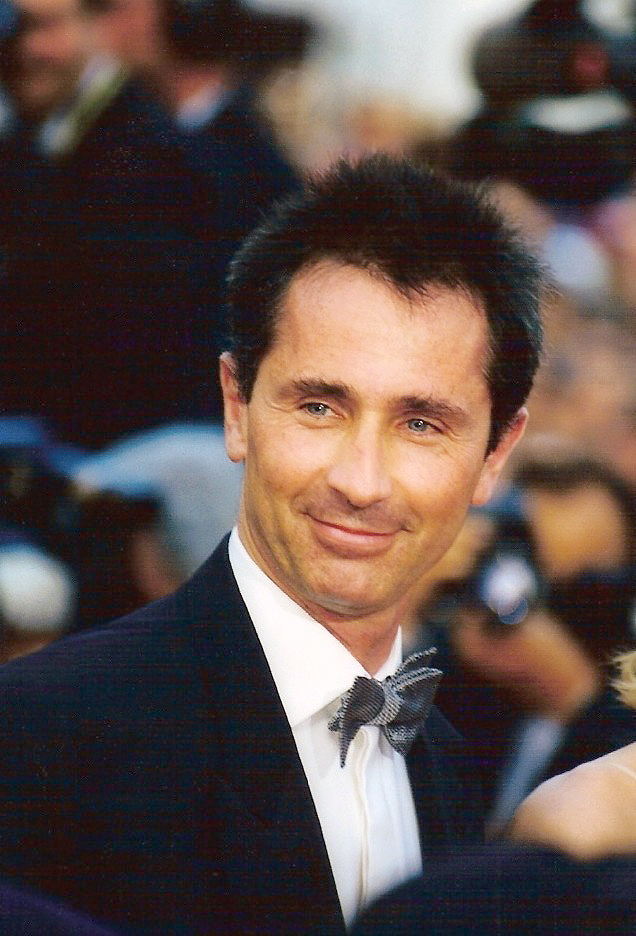
Thierry Lhermitte plays Pierre Brochant, a Parisian publisher, who invites Pignon to his weekly "idiots' dinner" with calamitous results. Brochant spends the evening trying to locate his wife, Christine, who has left him.

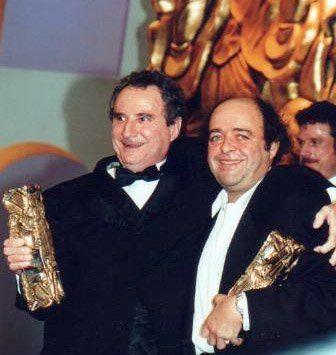
Jacques Villeret (right) plays François Pignon, the “idiot” invited to discuss his matchstick replicas of famous landmarks, who unintentionally wrecks Brochant’s life. Daniel Prévost (left) plays Lucien Cheval, a tax inspector who provides the address of Christine’s suspected lover. Cheval detects expensive objets d’art on which Brochant has not paid taxes.

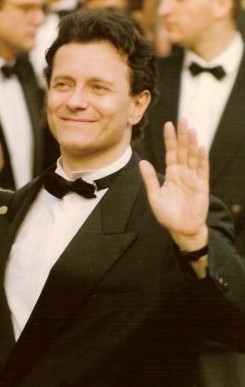
Francis Huster plays Juste Leblanc, Brochant’s former best friend, from whom Brochant stole away Christine years before.

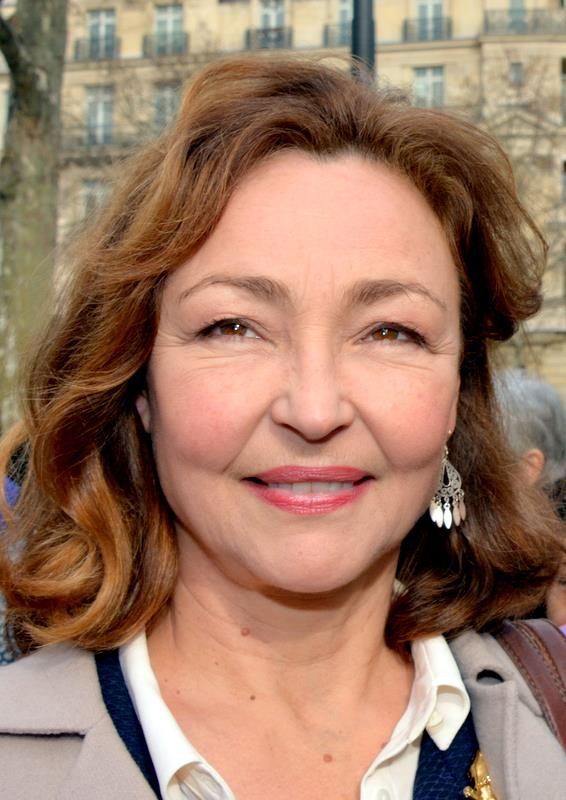
Catherine Frot plays Marlène Sasseur, Brochant’s former mistress, who Pignon mistakenly contacts, leading to the disclosure of Brochant’s infidelity to Christine.

Brochant solicits Pignon's assistance in making a series of telephone calls to locate his wife, but Pignon blunders each time, including revealing to Christine the existence of Brochant's former mistress, Marlene Sasseur. Thinking Marlene is Brochant's sister, since her name sounds like "sa sœur", Pignon mistakenly calls her and reveals Brochant's condition. Marlene announces that she is coming to help care for Brochant. When Brochant learns of Pignon's blunder, he asks Pignon to chase Marlene away, not wanting to complicate matters with "a nymphomaniac". Before Marlene's arrival, Christine briefly returns home; mistaking Christine for Marlene, Pignon gives "Marlene" advice on how to be less demanding to win back Brochant. Now informed of her husband's infidelity, Christine leaves. When the real Marlene arrives, an exasperated Brochant realizes what happened and asks Marlene to leave.

In the meantime, fearing Christine might have gone back to her previous lover, Brochant coaches Pignon in a ruse to call his former best friend, Juste Leblanc, from whom he stole Christine, to determine whether Christine is with him. Phoning to impersonate a film producer who wants to buy the rights to a book Christine co-wrote with Leblanc, Pignon blunders by giving Brochant's phone number to Leblanc. Recognizing the number, Leblanc calls Brochant to say that it hurt when Christine left him too. Unexpectedly sympathetic, Leblanc arrives to try to help Brochant locate Christine.

Making matters even worse, to get the address of a lothario with whom Christine might have taken refuge, Pignon invites tax inspector Lucien Cheval to Brochant's house, compelling Brochant to quickly to hide most of his valuables in an attempt to disguise his tax evasion. Through an ironic coincidence, Cheval's own wife is with the Lotario, upsetting Cheval and increasing the likelihood of a tax audit for Brochant.

Through the evening's events, Brochant is forced to reassess his mistakes. Brochant almost succeeds in reconciling with Christine when Pignon (unprompted) calls her to describe all the efforts Brochant has made that day to straighten out his life, including breaking up with his mistress, reconciling with his best friend, and wanting to make amends to her. A skeptical Christine asks Pignon whether Brochant is by his side, coaching him. Though Brochant is next to him―amazed at how gracefully Pignon has managed to describe his repentance to Christine―Pignon lies and says that he left Brochant and is calling from a phone booth. Christine hangs up in a pensive mood. Chastened, Brochant apologizes to Pignon for his arrogance and says that they will attend the next idiots' dinner together with him as Pignon's idiot.

When a softened-up Christine calls Brochant at home to discuss reconciliation―true to form―Pignon absent-mindedly picks up the phone that is next to him. Christine immediately hangs up, wrongly convinced that Brochant has manipulated Pignon's eloquent account of Brochant's reformation. The film ends with Brochant again calling Pignon an idiot and blaming Pignon for ruining his life.

== Cast ==
- Jacques Villeret as François Pignon
- Thierry Lhermitte as Pierre Brochant
- Francis Huster as Juste Leblanc
- Daniel Prévost as Lucien Cheval
- Alexandra Vandernoot as Christine Brochant
- Catherine Frot as Marlène Sasseur
- Edgar Givry as Jean Cordier
- Daniel Russo as Pascal Meneaux
  - Bernard Alane as Pascal Meneaux's voice
- Christian Pereirra as Dr. Sorbier
- Pétronille Moss as Mademoiselle Blond

== Background ==
The play on which the film is based premiered on 18 September 1993 at the Théâtre des Variétés, Paris, with a cast including Jacques Villeret as François Pignon, Claude Brasseur as Pierre Brochant, Michel Robbe as Juste Leblanc and Gérard Hernandez as Lucien Cheval, and directed by Pierre Mondy; it was revived the following season before touring to Bayonne, Liege and Marseille. The play continues to be revived.

As the plans of the hitman in Veber's earlier L'Emmerdeur were continually thrown off course by a well-meaning idiot, in Le Dîner de cons, the same relationship occurs, with "Thierry Lhermitte's supercilious publisher having his well-ordered life dismantled by the disastrously eager-to-please Jacques Villeret". Le Dîner de cons ran for over 900 performances on the Parisian stage before being made into a film, so "not surprisingly the pacing and mechanics of the comedy run with dovetailed precision".

With over 9 million tickets sold at the box office, Le Dîner de cons was the second most popular film in France in 1998, after Titanic.

The character name "François Pignon" occurs in several films of Francis Veber. Previously in L'Emmerdeur of 1973 Jacques Brel's character has the same name, as does Pierre Richard's role in Les Compères and Les Fugitifs; later Daniel Auteuil in Le Placard, Gad Elmaleh in La Doublure and Patrick Timsit in the 2008 re-make of L'Emmerdeur are all called François Pignon.

Besides Cosma's score, the film uses the 1961 song "Le temps ne fait rien à l'affaire" by Georges Brassens.

=== Critical response ===
The film was positively received by critics. On review aggregator Rotten Tomatoes, the film has an approval rating of 74% based on 46 reviews, with an average score of 6.8/10. On Metacritic, the film received a score of 73 based on 19 reviews, indicating "generally favorable reviews".

Kemp noted that "in this kind of comic pairing [it] isn't the gravitation of the idiot to the straight guy, which is understandable enough, but the reverse: the fatal delusion on the part of a logical individual, operating on cool self-interest, that even the most unpromising human material can, with a little coaching, be co-opted into the same well-ordered system". For Kemp the film was stolen by Villeret as Pignon "his balding, spherical head, bug eyes and pudgy little mouth" appearing as "a cross between a giant baby and a less aggressive Zero Mostel. His comic persona also shares something of a baby's abrupt, discontinuous mood swings, and in the film's funniest moments the camera focuses delightedly on his mobile moon-face as it slumps from inane self-satisfaction to lip-quivering dismay".

=== Accolades ===
At the 1999 César Awards, the film was honored with six nominations, of which it won three. The categories it won were Best Actor for Jacques Villeret, Best Supporting Actor for Daniel Prévost, and Best Original Screenplay or Adaptation for Francis Veber. It was nominated but did not win for Best Film, Veber as Best Director, and Catherine Frot as Best Supporting Actress.

Award / Film Festival	Category	Recipients and nominees	Result
César Awards	Best Film		Nominated
César Awards	Best Director	Francis Veber	Nominated
César Awards	Best Actor	Jacques Villeret	Won
César Awards	Best Supporting Actor	Daniel Prévost	Won
César Awards	Best Supporting Actress	Catherine Frot	Nominated
César Awards	Best Original Screenplay or Adaptation	Francis Veber	Won
Goya Awards	Best European Film		Nominated
Lumière Awards	Best Actor	Jacques Villeret	Won
Lumière Awards	Best Screenplay	Francis Veber	Won

== Soundtrack ==
Le Dîner de cons

Soundtrack album by Vladimir Cosma
- Released: 17 January 2000
- Length: 40:05
- Label: Larghetto

No.	Title	Performer(s)	Length
1.	"Dîner de cons" (orchestral version)	Philip Catherine, Romane, Vladimir Cosma & LAM Philharmonic Orchestra	2:45
2.	"Le temps ne fait rien à l'affaire"	Georges Brassens	2:08
3.	"Dîner de cons" (Phillip Catherine version)	Vladimir Cosma & Philip Catherine	3:32
4.	"Christine et Brochant"	Vladamir Cosma & String Orchestra	0:59
5.	"Manciniade"	Vladimir Cosma	3:20
6.	"Cheval, contrôleur fiscal"	Vladimir Cosma & LAM Philharmonic Orchestra	2:14
7.	"Con à grande vitesse"	Vladimir Cosma & Philip Catherine	2:16
8.	"Nincompoop"	Vladimir Cosma & ICE Group	1:57
9.	"Pignon décomposé"	Vladimir Cosma & String Orchestra & Guitar	1:21
10.	"Marlène Sasseur, nymphomane"	Vladimir Cosma	1:27
11.	"Départ de Christine"	Vladimir Cosma & String Orchestra	1:06
12.	"Dîner de cons" (Romane version)	Philip Catherine, Romane & Vladimir Cosma	3:31
13.	"Louche connexion"	Vladimir Cosma	2:42
14.	"Allo, Henry!"	Vladimir Cosma	3:15
15.	"Juste Leblanc"	Vladimir Cosma & String Orchestra & Guitar	1:29
16.	"Dîner de cons"	Philip Catherine, Romane & Vladimir Cosma	6:03
Total length:			40:05

== Adaptations ==
Year	Film	Language	Cast	Director
2007	Bheja Fry	Hindi	Rajat Kapoor, Vinay Pathak, Sarika	Sagar Ballary
2008	Mr. Garagasa	Kannada	Komal Kumar, Anant Nag, Aishwarya	Dinesh Baboo
2010	April Fool	Malayalam	Siddique, Jagadish, Navya Natarajan, Biju Menon, Jagathy Sreekumar	Viji Thampi
2010	Dinner for Schmucks	English	Steve Carell, Paul Rudd, Stéphanie Szostak, Jemaine Clement, Lucy Punch, Zach Galifianakis, Bruce Greenwood	Jay Roach
