= Vladimir Cosma =

Romanian musician (born 1940)

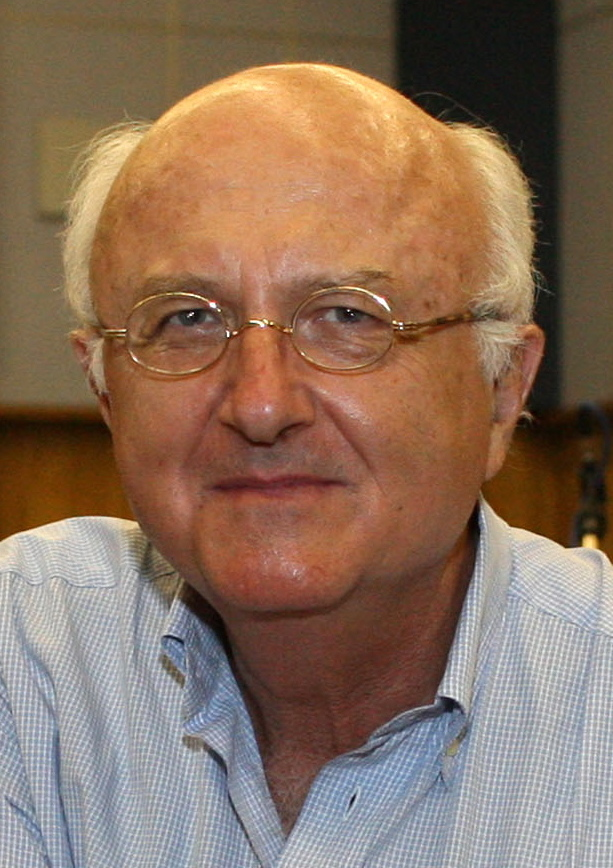
- Cosma in 2007

Background information
- Also known as: Jeff Jordan
- Born: Vladimir Cosma; 13 April 1940 (age 86); Bucharest, Kingdom of Romania
- Occupations: Composer, conductor
- Instrument: Violin
- Years active: 1964–present

Vladimir Cosma (born 13 April 1940) is a Romanian composer, conductor and violinist, who has made his career in France and the United States.

== Personal life ==
He was born into a family of musicians. His father Teodor Cosma was a pianist and conductor, and his mother Carola Pimper a writer-composer. His uncle Edgar Cosma was a composer and conductor.

One of Vladimir's grandmothers, a pianist, was a student of Ferruccio Busoni.

== Career ==
After receiving first prizes for violin and composition at the Bucharest Conservatory, Vladimir Cosma arrived in Paris in 1963 and continued his studies at the Conservatoire national supérieur de musique de Paris, working with Nadia Boulanger. As well as for classical music, he discovered early on a passion for jazz, film music and all forms of popular music.

From 1964 he made a number of international tours as a concert violinist and began to devote himself more and more to composing. He wrote various compositions including: Trois mouvements d'été for symphony orchestra, Oblique for violoncello and string orchestra, music for theatre and ballet (Volpone for the Comédie Française, the opera Fantômas...).

In 1968, Yves Robert entrusted him with his first film music for Alexandre le Bienheureux.

Cosma has since composed more than three hundred scores for feature films and TV series. His numerous successes in the cinema have notably been in collaboration with Yves Robert, Gérard Oury, Francis Veber, Claude Pinoteau, Jean-Jacques Beineix, Claude Zidi, Ettore Scola, Pascal Thomas, Pierre Richard, Yves Boisset, André Cayatte, Jean-Pierre Mocky, Edouard Molinaro, Jean-Marie Poiré, etc. Films he composed the score for include: Le Grand Blond avec une chaussure noire, Diva, Les Aventures de Rabbi Jacob, La Boum, Le Bal, L'As des as, La Chèvre, Les Fugitifs, Les Zozos, Pleure pas la bouche pleine, Dupont Lajoie, Un éléphant ça trompe énormément, La Dérobade, Le Père Noël est une ordure, L'Étudiante, La Gloire de mon père, Le Château de ma mère, Le dîner de cons, etc.

Cosma has also been featured in major French and American television productions: Michel Strogoff, Kidnapped, Mistral's Daughter, Châteauvallon, Les Mystères de Paris, Les Coeurs brûlés, etc.

Film music allowed him to approach and develop many different musical styles: jazz (with music written for soloists such as Chet Baker, Toots Thielemans, Don Byas, Stéphane Grappelli, Jean-Luc Ponty, Philip Catherine, Tony Coe, Pepper Adams; chanson (for Nana Mouskouri, Marie Laforêt, Richard Sanderson, Diane Dufresne, Herbert Léonard, Mireille Mathieu, Nicole Croisille, Lara Fabian, Guy Marchand); and original compositions inspired by folk music (for Gheorghe Zamfir, Stanciu Simion "Syrinx", pan-flute, Liam O'Flynn, pipes/Romane-guitar), as well as classical music (Berlin Concerto for violin and orchestra, Concerto for Euphonium and orchestra, Concerto Ibérique for trumpet and orchestra, Courts Métrages for brass quintet, etc.)

In 2006 Cosma himself conducted the world premiere of his composition Eh bien ! Dansez maintenant, a divertissement for narrator and symphony orchestra, adapting eleven of La Fontaine's Fables. The work's title refers to the ant's rejoinder to the grasshopper when it comes begging for food in the first of the fables: "You sang all summer? Now go and dance!" In Cosma's interpretation, the recitation of the story is unaccompanied, but each of the fables is illustrated in a different dance measure – from polka to pasodoble, from gavotte to foxtrot. The first performance of many that followed took place at the Victoria Hall in Geneva, with the Orchestre de la Suisse Romande and Lambert Wilson as narrator. Conducting the Orchestre National de France, he gave a first performance in Paris of this work in December 2010 at the Théâtre des Champs-Elysées, featuring Éric Génovèse of the Comédie Française.

Vladimir Cosma went on to write the opera Marius et Fanny, adapted from Marcel Pagnol, for which the first production took place in September 2007 at the Opéra de Marseille with Roberto Alagna and Angela Gheorghiu in the title roles, as well as Jean-Philippe Lafont in the role of César. The performances were repeated several times on television on the channels Arte and France 3.

In 2008 he composed the music for the musical comedy Les Aventures de Rabbi Jacob performed at the Palais des Congrès in Paris, with Éric Métayer, Marianne James, Spike, Julie Victor, among others.

In June 2009, Vladimir Cosma conducted the world premiere, in the Eglise Sainte-Madeleine de Béziers, of his cantata 1209, for soprano, narrator, children's choir and orchestra, written especially for the 8th centenary of the Sac de Béziers.

He is dedicated to re-writing his film music with the intention of conducting performances in symphonic concerts, thus approaching a wider audience than at the cinema. Among others, he gave a concert in Geneva in 2003 with the Orchestre de la Suisse Romande, a series of concerts in 2003 with the Orchestre National de Lyon, three concerts in 2005 in Paris at the Grand Rex, and a concert in 2010 with the Orchestre national d'Île-de-France in the Théâtre du Châtelet in Paris.

He has also appeared in many countries with major symphony orchestras and such prestigious soloists as Ivry Gitlis, Vadim Repin, Wilhelmenia Fernandez, Patrice Fontanarosa, Jean-Luc Ponty, Didier Lockwood, Stanciu Simion, Philip Catherine and others. A book of interviews with Vincent Perrot entitled Vladimir Cosma comme au cinéma was published in 2009 in the Editions Hors Collection and an anthology of his film music regrouping 91 complete original soundtracks in two volumes has just come out. Two evenings were devoted to him by the French TV channel, France 3 in 2010, airing his concert at the Théâtre du Châtelet and a documentary Vladimir Cosma intime.

Cosma received two Césars for the best movie score, for Diva (1981) and Le Bal (1984), two Golden Sevens for the best music for television, as well as a number of prizes and awards in France and other countries. He has also obtained numerous gold and platinum records all over the world (France, Germany, Japan, England, Switzerland, Belgium, Italy, the Netherlands, Scandinavia). Cosma is Chevalier de l'ordre National la Légion d'Honneur, as well as Commandeur des Arts et des Lettres. He has also been awarded the Romanian Ordinul "Meritul cultural" în grad de Cavaler.

== Works ==
=== Film and television ===
==== 1960s ====
Year	Title	English title	Creators	Type	Notes
1966	Le Plus Vieux Métier du monde	The Oldest Profession	Jean-Luc Godard, Claude Autant-Lara, Philippe de Broca...	Sketch film	Music by Michel Legrand and Cosma
1966	Oum le dauphin blanc	Zoom the White Dolphin		Animated series – 52 episodes	Co-composed music with Michel Legrand, arrangements and orchestral direction.
1967	But		Dominique Delouche	Short film	
1968	Alexandre le bienheureux	Very Happy Alexander	Yves Robert	Film	
1968	Maldonne (English: Misgift)		Sergio Gobbi	Film	
1968	Les Prisonniers de la liberté	Prisoners of freedom	Yona Zaretsky		
1968	Sayarim (Scouting Patrol)		Micha Shagrir		Arrangements and orchestral direction
1968	Pour un amour lointain	For a Distant Love	Edmond Séchan		Arrangements and orchestral direction
1969	Clérambard		Yves Robert	Film	
1969	Appelez-moi Mathilde	Call Me Mathilde	Pierre Mondy		Arrangements and orchestral direction
1969	Le Miroir de la terre (English: The mirror of the earth)		Edmond Séchan	Short film	
1969	Les Aventures de Tom Sawyer	The Adventures of Tom Sawyer	Wolfgang Liebeneiner	TV series	

==== 1970s ====
Year	Title	English title	Creators	Type	Notes
1970	Le Distrait	Absent-minded, alternative English title: The Daydreamer	Pierre Richard	Film	
1970	Térésa		Gérard Vergez	Film	
1970	Caïn de nulle part		Daniel Daërt	Film	
1971	Les Malheurs d'Alfred	The Troubles of Alfred	Pierre Richard	Film	
1971	Tang		André Michel	TV series, 13 x 26'	
1972	Le Grand Blond avec une chaussure noire	The Tall Blond Man with One Black Shoe	Yves Robert	Film	
1972	Les Zozos		Pascal Thomas	Film	
1972	Les Félines		Daniel Daërt	Film	
1972	Neither by Day Nor by Night		Steven Hilliard Stern	Film	
1973	L'Affaire Crazy Capo		Patrick Jamain	Film	
1973	Pleure pas la bouche pleine		Pascal Thomas	Film	
1973	La dernière bourrée à Paris		Raoul André	Film	
1973	Les Grands Sentiments font les bons gueuletons		Michel Berny	Film	
1973	Salut l'artiste	Hail the Artist	Yves Robert	Film	
1973	La Raison du plus fou		François Reichenbach	Film	With Raymond Devos
1973	Les Aventures de Rabbi Jacob	The Mad Adventures of Rabbi Jacob	Gérard Oury	Film	
1973	Le Dingue		Daniel Daërt	Film	
1973	Les Grands Détectives		Jacques Nahum, Jean-Pierre Decourt, Jean Herman, Alexandre Astruc...	TV series, 6 x 52'	
1973	La Main enchantée		Michel Subiela	TV film	
1974	La Rivale		Sergio Gobbi	Film	
1974	Le Chaud Lapin		Pascal Thomas	Film	
1974	La Moutarde me monte au nez	Lucky Pierre	Claude Zidi	Film	
1974	La Gueule de l'emploi		Jacques Rouland	Film	
1974	Le Retour du Grand Blond		Yves Robert	Film	
1974	La Virée superbe		Gérard Vergez	Film	
1975	Dupont Lajoie	The Common Man	Yves Boisset	Film	
1975	La Course à l'échalote		Claude Zidi	Film	
1975	Catherine et Cie		Michel Boisrond	Film	
1975	Le Faux-cul		Roger Hanin	Film	
1975	The Pink Telephone		Edouard Molinaro	Film	
1975	Adios		André Michel	TV mini-series, 3 x 90'	
1975	Hugues-le-Loup		Michel Subiela	TV film	
1975	TF1				Channel and news broadcast theme.
1975	Cinéma du Dimanche				Theme
1976	Les Œufs brouillés	Scrambled Eggs	Joël Santoni	Film	
1976	La Surprise du chef		Pascal Thomas	Film	
1976	Le Jouet	The Toy	Francis Veber	Film	
1976	Un éléphant ça trompe énormément		Yves Robert	Film	
1976	Dracula père et fils	Dracula and Son	Edouard Molinaro	Film	
1976	L'Aile ou la Cuisse		Claude Zidi	Film	
1976	A chacun son enfer		André Cayatte	Film	Autopsy of a monster
1976	Michel Strogoff		Jean-Pierre Decourt	TV series, 7 x 55'	
1976	Le Collectionneur de cerveaux		Michel Subiela	TV film	Les Robots pensants
1976	L'Assassinat de Concino Concini		Gérard Vergez	TV film	
1976	Les Mystères de Loudun		Gérard Vergez	TV film	
1976	Silence ...on tourne		Roger Coggio		
1977	Le Chien de Monsieur Michel		Jean-Jacques Beineix	Short film	
1977	Nous irons tous au paradis		Yves Robert	Film	
1977	Un Oursin dans la poche		Pascal Thomas	Film	
1977	Animal		Claude Zidi	Film	
1977	Vous n'aurez pas l'Alsace et la Lorraine		Coluche	Film	
1977	La Mer promise		Jacques Ertaud	TV film	
1977	Les Confessions d'un enfant de Cœur		Jean L'Hôte	TV film	
1977	Vaincre à Olympie		Michel Subiela	TV film	
1977	Les Filles de Malemort		Daniel Daërt		
1977	Où vont les poissons rouges ?		André Michel	TV film	
1977	Richelieu		Jean-Pierre Decourt	TV series, 6 x 52'	
1977	Enquête posthume sur un vaisseau fantôme		Michel Subiela	TV film	
1977	Les Jeunes Filles		Lazare Iglesis	TV mini-series, 2 x 90'	
1977	Le Loup blanc		Jean-Pierre Decourt	TV mini-series, 3 x 55'	
1977	L'Affaire des poisons		Gérard Vergez	TV film	
1977	La Zizanie		Claude Zidi	Film	
1977	La Raison d'Etat		André Cayatte	Film	
1978	Je suis timide mais je me soigne		Pierre Richard	Film	
1978	Cause toujours... tu m'intéresses !		Edouard Molinaro	Film	
1978	Confidences pour confidences		Pascal Thomas	Film	
1978	L'Enlèvement du Régent		Gérard Vergez	TV film	Le Chevalier d'Harmental
1978	Madame le juge – Episode 1: Le Dossier Françoise Muller		Edouard Molinaro	TV	
1978	Les Grandes Conjurations – Episode: Le Connétable de Bourbon		Jean-Pierre Decourt	TV	
1978	Histoires insolites. Episode 1: La Stratégie du serpent		Yves Boisset	TV	
1978	Plein les poches pour pas un rond		Daniel Daërt		
1978	L'Equipage		André Michel	TV film	
1978	Médecins de nuit		Nicolas Ribowski, Bruno Gantillon, Jean-Pierre Prévost, Philippe Lefèbvre, Peter Kassovitz...	TV series, 44 x 55'	
1979	Memoirs of a French Whore (La Dérobade)		Daniel Duval	Film	
1979	Courage fuyons		Yves Robert	Film	
1979	C'est pas moi, c'est lui		Pierre Richard	Film	
1979	Ils sont grands ces petits		Joël Santoni	Film	
1979	Histoires de voyous: Les Marloupins		Michel Berny	TV	
1979	Histoires de voyous: La Belle Affaire		Louis Grospierre	TV	
1979	La Servante		Lazare Iglesis	TV film	
1979	La Belle vie		Lazare Iglesis	TV film	
1979	Duos sur canapé		Marc Camoletti		
1979	Les Aventures de David Balfour		Jean-Pierre Decourt	TV series, 6 x 55'	
1979	La Fabrique, un conte de Noël		Pascal Thomas	TV film	
1979	Le Baiser au lépreux		André Michel	TV film	
1979	Sam et Sally		Nicolas Ribowski, Jean Girault, Robert Pouret, Joël Séria...	1st TV series, 6 x 55'	
1979	Sam et Sally		Joël Santoni	2nd TV series, 6 x 55'	

==== 1980s ====
Year	Title	English title	Creators	Type	Notes
1980	La Femme enfant		Raphaële Billetdoux		L'Ombre du loup by Raphaële Billetdoux
1980	Inspecteur la Bavure		Claude Zidi		
1980	Diva		Jean-Jacques Beineix	Film	César for Best Film Music
1980	Le Bar du téléphone		Claude Barrois		
1980	La Boum		Claude Pinoteau		
1980	Celles qu'on a pas eues		Pascal Thomas		
1980	Le Coup du parapluie		Gérard Oury		
1980	Laat de Dokter maar schuiven		Nikolai van der Heyde		
1980	L'Antichambre		Michel Bienvenu	Short film	
1980	Petit déjeuner compris		Michel Berny	TV series, 6 x 52'	
1980	Les Mystères de Paris		André Michel	TV series, 6 x 52'	
1980	Les Roses de Dublin		Lazare Iglesis	TV series, 6 x 52'	
1980	Les Maîtres sonneurs		Lazare Iglesis	TV film	
1981	Les Sous-doués en vacances		Claude Zidi		
1981	Une Affaire d'hommes		Nicolas Ribowski		
1981	Pourquoi pas nous ?		Michel Berny		
1981	La Chèvre		Francis Veber		
1981	L'Année prochaine... si tout va bien		Jean-Loup Hubert		
1981	La Grande Pitié du Comte de Gruyère		Lazare Iglesis	TV film	
1981	La Double vie de Théophraste Longuet		Yannick Andreï	TV mini-series, 3 x 90'	
1981	La Vie des autres		Jean-Pierre Prévost	TV film	L'Ascension de Catherine Sarrazin
1981	Pollufission 2000		Jean-Pierre Prévost	TV film	
1981	La Guerre des insectes		Peter Kassovitz	TV film	
1982	Jamais avant le mariage		Daniel Ceccaldi		
1982	Le Père Noël est une ordure		Jean-Marie Poiré		
1982	La Boum 2		Claude Pinoteau		
1982	Tout le monde peut se tromper		Jean Couturier		
1982	L'As des as		Gérard Oury		
1982	L'Adieu aux As		Jean-Pierre Decourt	TV series, 6 x 52'	
1982	Les Dames à la licorne		Lazare Iglesis	mini-series, 2 x 90'	
1982	La Veuve rouge		Edouard Molinaro	mini-series, 2 x 90'	
1982	Un Adolescent d'autrefois		André Michel	TV film	
1983	Le Bal		Ettore Scola		César for Best Film Music
1983	Le Prix du danger		Yves Boisset		
1983	Banzaï		Claude Zidi		
1983	Les Compères		Francis Veber		
1983	P'tit Con		Gérard Lauzier		
1983	L'Etincelle		Michel Lang		
1983	Retenez moi... ou je fais un malheur !		Michel Gérard		
1983	Biniky le Dragon Rose			TV, animated series	Theme song
1983	La Chambre des dames		Yannick Andreï	TV series, 10 x 52'	
1983	La Jeune femme en vert		Lazare Iglesis	TV film	
1984	La Septième Cible		Claude Pinoteau		
1984	Just The Way You Are		Edouard Molinaro		
1984	Le Jumeau		Yves Robert		
1984	La Tête dans le sac		Gérard Lauzier		
1984	Billet doux		Michel Berny	TV series, 6 x 60'	
1984	L'Homme de Suez		Christian-Jaque	TV series, 6 x 52'	
1984	L'Amour en héritage			TV series, 8 x 55'	Mistral's Daughter
1984	La Bavure		Nicolas Ribowski	TV mini-series, 3 x 55'	
1984	Hello Einstein			TV series, 6 x 55'	Einstein
1984	Châteauvallon		Paul Planchon, Serge Friedman	TV series, 26 x 52'	
1985	Les Rois du gag		Claude Zidi		
1985	Astérix et la surprise de César		Pierre et Gaëtan Brizzi	Animated film	
1985	Le Gaffeur		Serge Pénard		
1985	Drôle de samedi		Bay Okan		
1985	La Galette du roi		Jean-Michel Ribes		
1985	Les Mondes Engloutis	Spartakus and the Sun Beneath the Sea	Michel Gauthier, Nina Wolmark	Animated TV series, 2 seasons 52 x 26'	
1986	Mort un dimanche de pluie		Joël Santoni		
1986	Les Fugitifs		Francis Veber		
1986	Asterix in Britain		Pino van Lamsweerde	Animated film	
1986	Lévy et Goliath		Gérard Oury		
1986	L'Été 36		Yves Robert	TV mini-series, 2 x 90'	
1986	Claire		Lazare Iglesis	TV film	
1986	Le Tiroir secret		Michel Boisrond, Edouard Molinaro, Nadine Trintignant, Roger Guilloz...	TV series, 6 x 52'	
1986	Vive la Comédie		Jacques Fabbri, Jean-Luc Moreau, Paul Planchon, Jean-Pierre Bisson...	TV series, 10 x 90'	
1986	Tour de France		Philippe Monnier	TV mini-series, 2 x 52'	
1987	Le Moustachu		Dominique Chaussois		
1987	Cœurs croisés		Stéphanie de Mareuil		
1987	Promis... juré !		Jacques Monnet		
1987	La Petite Allumeuse		Danièle Dubroux		
1987	L'Or noir de Lornac		Tony Flaadt	TV series	
1987	Rahan, le fils des âges farouches		Alain Sion	Animated TV series, 26 x 26'	
1987	Nitwits		Nikolai van der Heyde		
1988	L'Etudiante		Claude Pinoteau		
1988	Corps z'à corps		André Halimi		
1988	La Vouivre		Georges Wilson		
1988	Les Pique-assiettes		Dominique Giuliani, Gilles Amado, Jean-Luc Moreau...	TV series, 26 x 26'	
1988	M'as-tu vu ?		Jean-Michel Ribes and Eric Le Hung	TV series, 6 x 52'	
1988	Julien Fontanes Magistrat		Michel Berny	TV film	Episode La Bête noire
1989	Il gèle en enfer		Jean-Pierre Mocky		
1989	Les Grandes Familles		Edouard Molinaro	TV series, 4 x 84'	
1989	L'Eté de la révolution		Lazare Iglesis	TV film	
1989	Till We Meet Again		Charles Jarrott	TV series, 3 x 100'	Le Secret de Château Valmont
1989	Les Sœurs du Nord		Joël Santoni	TV film	SOS Disparus
1989	Le Retour d'Arsène Lupin		Michel Wyn, Jacques Besnard, Philippe Condroyer, Michel Boisrond...	TV series, 12 x 56'	
1989	Mésaventures		Elise Durupt	TV series	161 x 26'
1989	Intrigues		Maurice Dugowson and others	TV series	187 x 26'

==== 1990s ====
Year	Title	English title	Director(s)	Notes
1990	La Gloire de mon père		Yves Robert	
1990	Le Château de ma mère		Yves Robert	
1990	La Pagaille		Pascal Thomas	
1990	La Belle anglaise 2		Jacques Besnard	TV series, 6 x 52'
1990	Night of the Fox – Le Complot du Renard		Charles Jarrott	TV films, 2 x 90'
1990	Edouard et ses filles		Michel Lang	TV series, 6 x 55'
1990	The Nighmare Years – Les Années infernales		Anthony Page	TV series, 4 x 90'
1990	Le Gorille – Le Pavé du Gorille		Roger Hanin	TV film
1990	Le Déjeuner de Sousceyrac		Lazare Iglesis	TV film
1990	Passions			TV series, 57 x 26'
1990	Côté cœur			TV series, 68 x 26'
1991	La Neige et le Feu		Claude Pinoteau	
1991	Myster Mocky présente:La Méthode Barnol		Jean-Pierre Mocky	TV film
1991	Myster Mocky présente:Dis-moi qui tu hais		Jean-Pierre Mocky	TV film
1991	Myster Mocky présente:La Vérité qui tue		Jean-Pierre Mocky	TV film
1991	La Totale!		Claude Zidi	
1991	La Montre, la croix et la manière – The Favour, the Watch and the Very Big Fish		Ben Lewin	
1992	Ville à vendre		Jean-Pierre Mocky	
1992	Coup de jeune		Xavier Gélin	
1992	Le Souper		Edouard Molinaro	
1992	Le Bal des casse-pieds		Yves Robert	
1992	Les Cœurs brûlés		Jean Sagols	TV series
1992	La Femme abandonnée		Edouard Molinaro	TV film
1993	Cuisine et Dépendances		Philippe Muyl	
1993	Le Mari de Léon		Jean-Pierre Mocky	
1993	La Soif de l'or		Gérard Oury	
1993	Mercedes mon amour (Sarı Mercedes)		Bay Okan	
1993	Le Boeuf clandestin		Lazare Iglesis	TV film
1993	Trois jours pour gagner		Michel Berny, Alain Nahum...	TV series, 13 x 27'
1994	Montparnasse-Pondichéry		Yves Robert	
1994	Bonsoir		Jean-Pierre Mocky	
1994	Cache Cash		Claude Pinoteau	
1994	L'Affaire		Sergio Gobbi	
1994	Les Yeux d'Hélène		Jean Sagols	TV series, 9 x 90'
1994	Dazzle – Les Racines du Coeur		Richard A. Colla	TV mini-series, 2 x 90'
1995	Les Sables mouvants		Paul Carpita	
1995	Les Nouveaux exploits d'Arsène Lupin		Alain Nahum, Nicolas Ribowski	TV series
1996	Le Jaguar		Francis Veber	
1996	Le Plus Beau Métier du monde		Gérard Lauzier	
1996	Les Palmes de monsieur Schutz		Claude Pinoteau	
1996	Faisons un rêve		Jean-Michel Ribes	TV film
1996	Le Cheval de coeur		Charlotte Brandström	TV film
1996	Berjac: Coup de maître		Jean-Michel Ribes	TV film
1996	Berjac: Coup de théâtre		Jean-Michel Ribes	TV film
1997	Soleil		Roger Hanin	
1997	Drôle de père		Charlotte Brandström	TV film
1997	Maître da Costa – Episode: Le Doigt de Dieu		Bob Swaim	TV
1998	Le Dîner de cons		Francis Veber	
1998	La Femme du Boulanger		Nicolas Ribowski	TV film
1999	Le Schpountz		Gérard Oury	
1999	Le fils du Français		Gérard Lauzier	
1999	Le Monde à l'envers		Charlotte Brandström	TV mini-series, 2 x 90'
1999	La Fiction des Guignols		Bruno Le Jean	TV film
1999	Voleur de cœur		Patrick Jamain	TV film

==== 2000s ====
Year	Title	English title	Director(s)	Notes
2000	La Vache et le Président		Philippe Muyl	
2000	La Trilogie Marseillaise: Marius, Fanny, César		Nicolas Ribowski	TV mini-series, 3 x 95'
2001	Le Placard		Francis Veber	
2001	Le Monde à l'envers – Episode 3: Le Secret d'Alice		Michaël Perrotta	TV
2002	Les Homards de l'utopie – Marche et rêve !		Paul Carpita	
2002	Clémy		Nicolas Ribowski	TV film
2002	Action justice – Episode 1: "Une mère indigne"		Alain Schwartzstein	TV
2003	Le Furet		Jean-Pierre Mocky	
2003	Action justice – Episode 2: "Un mauvais médecin"		Jean-Pierre Igoux	TV
2003	Action justice – Episode 3: "Déclaré coupable"		Alain Nahum	TV
2004	Albert est méchant		Hervé Palud	
2004	Le Président Ferrare		Alain Nahum	TV series
2004	Touristes, Oh yes !		Jean-Pierre Mocky	
2005	Grabuge		Jean-Pierre Mocky	
2005	Les Ballets écarlates		Jean-Pierre Mocky	
2005	Le Bénévole		Jean-Pierre Mocky	
2006	Le Temps des porte-plumes		Daniel Duval	
2006	Le Deal		Jean-Pierre Mocky	
2007	13, French Street		Jean-Pierre Mocky	
2007	Myster Mocky présente		Jean-Pierre Mocky	TV series
2008	Myster Mocky présente		Jean-Pierre Mocky	TV series
2008	Climax		Frédéric Sojcher	short film
2009	Colère		Jean-Pierre Mocky	TV film
2009	Myster Mocky présente		Jean-Pierre Mocky	TV series
2010	Les Insomniaques		Jean-Pierre Mocky	
2010	Crédit pour tous		Jean-Pierre Mocky	
2010	Myster Mocky présente		Jean-Pierre Mocky	TV series
2011	Le dossier Toroto		Jean-Pierre Mocky	
2011	Calomnies		Jean-Pierre Mocky	
2011	Hitler à Hollywood (H/H)		Frédéric Sojcher	

=== Operas and stage works ===
Year	Title	English Title	Director	Notes
1970	Fantômas		Eve Griliquez	Chamber opera based on the work of Robert Desnos
1971	Volpone		Gérard Vergez	Stage and ballet music for the Comédie-Française
1986	Alcazar de Paris			Msic and songs from the Alcazar cabaret revue by Frantz Salieri
2000, 2001, 2003, 2004	Election Miss France			Music, ballets and songs
2007	Marius et Fanny			Opera in two acts based on the work of Marcel Pagnol
2008	Les Aventures de Rabbi Jacob	The Mad Adventures of Rabbi Jacob	Gérard Oury	Musical comedy

=== Other genres ===
==== Symphonic works based on film soundtracks ====
- L'As des As – Ouverture (2001–2002)
- La Boum – suite d'orchestre (1991)
- La Gloire de mon Père, Le Château de ma mère – suite d'orchestre (1991–2006) Habanera, Les Vacances, Isabelle, Le Parc Borelli, Massalia Rag, Valse d'Augustine
- Le Grand Blond avec une chaussure noire – Danse Roumaine (1991)
- Michel Strogoff – suite d'orchestre (1995) – Thème de Nadia, Danse Tartare
- Les Aventures de Rabbi Jacob – Danses Hassidiques (1996)
- Le Bal, pour trompette et orchestre (1994)
- La Course à l'échalote – suite d'orchestre (1995)
- La Dérobade (Solitude) (1995)
- Le Jaguar (Thème de l'Aventure) (1999)
- Les Aventures de David Balfour (La Légende de David) (2006)
- Le Placard (2001)
- La Chèvre (La Cabra) pour kena ou naï et orchestre (2002)
- Les Compères (1991)
- Les Fugitifs – suite d'orchestre (1991)
- La Boum 2 – suite d'orchestre (1998)
- Diva (Promenade sentimentale ) version orchestrale (2002)
- Un Eléphant, ça trompe énormément (Hello Marilyn) (1991)
- L'Eté 36 – suite d'orchestre (1995)
- L'Amour en héritage – version orchestrale (1996)
- Châteauvallon – version orchestrale (1999)
- Les Cœurs brûlés – version orchestrale (1996)
- Le Bal des casse-pieds (Les Casse-pieds) – pour solistes de jazz et orchestre (1999)
- Le Bal des casse-pieds (Les Casse-pieds) – version orchestrale (1999)
- Salut l'Artiste (Yves et Danièle) pour solistes de jazz et orchestre (1999)
- L'Aile ou la Cuisse (Concerto gastronomique) pour solistes de jazz et orchestre (2003)
- Le Père Noël au Paradis – suite basée sur les musiques des films: Le Père Noël est une ordure, Nous irons tous au Paradis, pour solistes de jazz et orchestre (1996–1999)
- Le Dîner de cons, pour solistes de jazz et orchestre (2002)

==== Works for soloists and orchestra ====
- Oblique, pour violoncelle et orchestre à cordes (1969)
- Concerto pour Euphonium et orchestre (commande du Festival et Concours international de Tuba de Guebwiller, 1997)
- Concerto Ibérique, pour trompette et orchestre (création lors du Concours international de cuivres de la ville de Narbonne, 1998)
- Concerto de Berlin, pour violon et orchestre
  - version du film La 7ème Cible (1984) – env. 9'
  - version intégrale (2001) – env.29'

==== Vocal, choral and symphonic ====
- Eh bien ! Dansez maintenant, divertissement d'après Les Fables de Jean de La Fontaine pour Récitant et orchestre symphonique (2006)
- Cantate 1209, pour Récitant, Soprano, Chœurs d'enfants et orchestre (2009)
- Reality du film La Boum, pour voix de ténor et orchestre (2001)
- L'Amour en héritage (Only Love), pour soprano et orchestre (1996)
- Your Eyes du film La Boum 2, pour soprano et orchestre (1998)
- Les Cœurs brûlés, pour soprano et orchestre (1996)
- Divine du film Diva pour soprano et orchestre (1996)
- Air de la Wally du film Diva (A.Catalani, argt.V.Cosma), pour soprano et orchestre (1980)
- You call it Love du film L'Etudiante pour soprano et orchestre (2002)
- Eternity du film La Vouivre pour soprano et orchestre (2002)

==== Military and concert band music ====
- Concerto pour Euphonium et orchestre d'harmonie (commande du Festival et Concours international de Tuba de Guebwiller, 1997)
- Concerto Ibérique, pour trompette et orchestre d'harmonie (création lors du Concours international de cuivres de la ville de Narbonne, 1998)
- La Boum – suite pour orchestre d'harmonie (2010)
- La Gloire de mon Père, Le Château de ma Mère – suite pour orchestre d'harmonie (2009) – Habanera, Les Vacances, Isabelle, Valse d'Augustine
- Le Grand Blond avec une chaussure noire – Danse Roumaine (2010)
- Michel Strogoff – suite pour orchestre d'harmonie (2008) – Thème de Nadia, Danse Tartare
- Les Aventures de Rabbi Jacob – Danses Hassidiques (2007)
- L'Aile ou la Cuisse – Concerto gastronomique (2007)
- Les Saxs Brothers du film Nous irons tous au Paradis pour Quintette de saxophones, Piano, Contrebasse et Batterie (2008)

==== Chamber music, pianoforte reductions ====
- Courts métrages Quintette de cuivres (commande du Festival et Concours international de Narbonne, 1996)
- 9 Recueils de Musiques de Films, pour instruments solistes et accompagnement de piano – Flûte, Clarinette, Hautbois, Saxophone alto, Cor, Euphonium, Trompette, Trombone, Violon (2011)
- Concerto pour Euphonium et orchestre, réduction pour Euphonium et Piano (1997)
- 9 Recueils de Musiques de Films, pour instruments solistes et accompagnement de piano – Flûte, Clarinet, Hautbois, Saxophone alto, Cor, Euphonium, Trompette, Trombone, Violon (2011)
- Concerto Ibérique, réduction pour Trompette et Piano (1998)
- Concerto de Berlin, réduction pour Violon et Piano
  - version du film La 7ème Cible – env. 9' (1984 – rev.1999)
  - version intégrale – env.29' (2002)
- Eh bien ! Dansez maintenant – divertissement d'après des Fables de Jean de La Fontaine – partition pour Récitant et Piano (2006)
- Marius et Fanny, réduction pour Piano et Chant (2007)
- Cantate 1209, réduction pour Piano, Récitant, Soprano, Chœurs d'enfants (2009)

==== Piano music ====
- Les Musiques de Films de Vladimir Cosma, Volumes 1, 2, 3, 4 (1982–1990)
- La Gloire de mon père – Le Château de ma mère, recueil pour piano (1990)

==== Vocal music and songs ====
- 2 Recueils pour voix et piano
  - Vladimir Cosma – Les plus belles chansons Cinéma & Télévision – volume 1 (1996)
  - Vladimir Cosma – Les plus belles chansons Cinéma & Télévision – volume 2 (1996)

Plus over a hundred songs including:

- "Reality", du film La Boum, interprétée par Richard Sanderson (1980)
- "L'Amour en héritage" (Only Love), interprétée par Nana Mouskouri (1984)
- "Destinée", des films Le Père Noël est une ordure et Les Sous-doués en vacances, interprétée par Guy Marchand (1982)
- "Puissance et Gloire", de la série TV Châteauvallon, interprétée par Herbert Léonard (1985)
- "Your Eyes", du film La Boum 2, interprétée par Cook Da Books (1982)
- "Le Ciel, La Terre et l'eau", du film Alexandre Le Bienheureux, interprétée par Isabelle Aubret (1968)
- "Un Souvenir heureux" de la série TV Le tiroir secret, interprétée par Diane Dufresne (1986)
- "You call it Love", du film L'Etudiante, interprétée par Karoline Krüger (1988)
- "My Life", de la série TV Till we meet again, interprétée par Mireille Mathieu (1989)
- "Je n'ai pas dit mon dernier mot d'amour", du film La Dérobade, interprétée par Nicole Croisille (1979)
- "L'Année prochaine si tout va bien", interprétée par Sofie Kremen (1981)
- "Ballade de Clérambard", du film Clérambard, interprétée par Marie Laforêt (1969)
- "Pour l'Amour", de la série TV La Chambre des Dames, interprétée par Annick Thoumazeau (1983)
- "Les Cœurs brûlés", interprétée par Nicole Croisille (1992)
- "Laisse-moi rêver", du film La Neige et le feu, interprétée par Lara Fabian (1991)
- "Les Mondes Engloutis", interprétée par les Mini Star (1985)
- "Maybe you're wrong", du film La Boum 2, interprétée par Freddie Meyer (1982)
- "Go on for ever", du film La Boum, interprétée par Richard Sanderson et Chantal Curtis (1980)
- "Get it together", du film Inspecteur La Bavure, interprétée par Chantal Curtis (1980)

== Awards ==
Year	Award		Work(s)
1981	Gold and Platinum Records for the Soundtracks		Diva, La Boum
1982	César Award	Best Original Music	Diva
1982	Moscow International Film Festival		Diva
1982	Gold and Platinum Records for the Soundtrack		La Boum 2
1983	SACEM	Grand Prize for Film Music Recording	For his entire body of work in Cannes
1984	César Award	Best Original Music	Le Bal
1985	Gold and Platinum Records for the Soundtracks		L'Amour en Héritage, Les Mondes Engloutis, Châteauvallon
1986	7 d'Or	Best Music	Eté 36
1986	Appointed to the rank of Commander of Arts and Letters		
1988	Gold Record for the Soundtrack		Le Bal
1990	SACEM	Grand Prize for Audiovisual Musical Work	
1991	7 d'Or	Best Music for Television	
1995	Medal of Honour – Beauvais		
2000	Medal of Honour from the General Council of Yonne		
2001	Warsaw Philip Award	Greatest Creative Achievement in European Film Music	
2003	SACEM	Grand Prize for Film Music Recording	
2004	Appointed Grand Officer of the Romanian Order of Cultural Merit.		
2005	Francophone First Film Festival of La Ciotat	Honorary Light	
2006	Honorary Medal of the City and Patron of the Municipal School of Music (Vandœuvre-lès-Nancy)		
2007	Tribute and Honorary Medal of the City of Cabourg.		
2008	Film Festival in Spa, Belgium	Phoenix Award trophy	Recognising his entire career
2009	Tribute and Medal of Honor of the City of Béziers.		
2010	Henri Langlois Prize from the Cinémathèque française 2010		

Awards
Preceded by not awarded	Golden Boll Award for Best Music Score; 1993 for Sarı Mercedes	Succeeded by Timur Selçuk
