= Edgar Givry =

French actor (born 1953)

- Born: 9 August 1953 (age 72); Saint-Raphaël, Var, France
- Occupation: Actor
- Years active: 1974-present

Edgar Givry (born 9 August 1953) is a French actor. He appeared in more than seventy films since 1974.

Givry came to prominence after appearing in television series such as Julie Lescaut and Navarro. He became most known as a voice actor, serving as the official French dub of John Malkovich and Kermit the Frog in The Muppets.

== Filmography ==
Film
| Year | Title | Role | Notes |
|---|---|---|---|
| 1974 | Creezy | | |
| 1989 | La Révolution française | Jean-Baptiste Cléry | |
| 1989 | Asterix and the Big Fight | Assurancetourix | Voice |
| 1992 | Indochine | Commissaire priseur | |
| 1992 | Le zèbre | Voix de l'inconnu | Voice |
| 1993 | Profil bas | Le chirurgien | |
| 1996 | Le Jaguar | Médecin hôpital | |
| 1996 | Passage à l'acte | | |
| 1998 | Le Dîner de Cons | Cordier | |
| 2001 | The Closet | Mathieu | |
| 2001 | La Tour Montparnasse Infernale | Le faux gardien (Greg) | |
| 2003 | Le Pharmacien de garde | Commissaire Fabri | |
| 2003 | Tais-toi ! | Visinet | |
| 2010 | Go West! A Lucky Luke Adventure | Crook | Voice |
| 2011 | L'Élève Ducobu | Directeur école Saint-Potache | |
| 2012 | Par les épines | Neuropsychiatrist | |
| 2016 | Débarquement immédiat! | Mercier | |

TV
| Year | Title | Role | Notes |
|---|---|---|---|
| 1998-2003 | H | Le directeur de l'hôpital | 8 episodes |
| 2002-2003 | La vie devant nous | Antoine de Courbel | 30 episodes |
| 2011 | Joséphine, ange gardien | Pierre Ruthman | TV series (1 Episode : "Tout pour la musique") |
