= André Valardy =

Belgian actor (1938–2007)

- Valardy in 1981
- Born: 17 May 1938; Antwerp, Belgium
- Died: 30 April 2007 (aged 68); Paris, France

André Valardy (born André Knoblauch, '17 May 1938 – 30 April 2007) was a Belgian actor, director and humorist.

== Filmography ==
Year	Title	Role	Director	Notes
1960	Les frangines		Jean Gourguet	
1967	Bang Bang	Le professeur d'anthropologie	Serge Piolet	
1968	Ne jouez pas avec les Martiens	Padirac, dit Paddy	Henri Lanoë	
1973	Papa les p'tits bateaux	Luc	Nelly Kaplan	
1973	L'emmerdeur	L'auto-stoppeur	Édouard Molinaro	
1973	The Mad Adventures of Rabbi Jacob		Gérard Oury	(scenes deleted)
1975	Fear Over the City	Un radio-reporter	Henri Verneuil	Uncredited
1975	The Pink Telephone	René Bastide	Édouard Molinaro	
1975	Speak to Me of Love	Le directeur du théâtre 'Chocolat'	Michel Drach	
1977	Monsieur Papa	Julien	Philippe Monnier	
1977	Bobby Deerfield	Autograph Hound	Sydney Pollack	
1977	Le Point de mire	Mercadier	Jean-Claude Tramont	Uncredited
1978	State Reasons		André Cayatte	
1979	Cause toujours... tu m'intéresses !	Le barman	Édouard Molinaro	
1979	Nous maigrirons ensemble	Serveur brasserie	Michel Vocoret	
1979	Les Charlots en délire	Le chef d'orchestre	Alain Basnier	
1980	Je vais craquer	Potel	François Leterrier	
1980	Rendez-moi ma peau...	L'illusionniste Janax	Patrick Schulmann	
1981	Faut s'les faire... ces légionnaires !	Gérard	Alain Nauroy	
1981	La Chèvre	Meyer	Francis Veber	
1981-1982	Julien Fontanes, magistrat	Robert / Sylvain, le chef des écolos	Jean Pignol and François Dupont-Midi	2 episodes
1982	Légitime violence	Varin	Serge Leroy	
1983	Attention, une femme peut en cacher une autre !	L'interprète / German translator	Samuel Fuller	
1984	Thieves After Dark	Monsieur Rochelle	Samuel Fuller	
1984	American Dreamer	Dimitri	Rick Rosenthal	
1987	Lévy et Goliath	Nathan	Gérard Oury	
1988	En toute innocence	Meunier	Alain Jessua	
1998	Que la lumière soit	Le dresseur ours	Arthur Joffé	
2000	Fidelity	Homme aux claquettes	Andrzej Żuławski	
2000	30 ans	Micolas Lenoyer	Laurent Perrin	
2015	Nothing Sacred	Javedan	Dylan Bank and Morgan Pehme	(final film role)
