= Statuto =

Statuto is Italian for statute. It is also a surname, notably of:

- Art Statuto (1925–2011), American football player
- Francesco Statuto (born 1971), Italian footballer and coach

== See also ==
- Cinema Statuto fire, theater fire in Turin
- Piazza Statuto, city square in Turin
- Statuto Albertino, Sardinian constitution
- Statuto Race, annual footrace in Italy
