= The Valet (2006 film) =

2006 film by Francis Veber

- French theatrical release poster
- French: La Doublure
- Directed by: Francis Veber
- Written by: Francis Veber
- Produced by: Patrice Ledoux
- Starring: Gad Elmaleh; Alice Taglioni; Daniel Auteuil; Kristin Scott Thomas; Richard Berry; Virginie Ledoyen; Dany Boon
- Cinematography: Robert Fraisse
- Edited by: Georges Klotz
- Music by: Alexandre Desplat
- Production companies: Gaumont; EFVE; TF1 Films Production; Kairos
- Distributed by: Gaumont Columbia TriStar Films (France); Belga Films (Belgium); Medusa Film (Italy)
- Release dates: 29 March 2006 (France and Belgium); 12 May 2006 (Italy)
- Running time: 86 minutes
- Countries: France; Belgium; Italy
- Language: French
- Budget: $28.3 million
- Box office: $29 million

The Valet (French: La Doublure, lit. 'The Stand-In') is a 2006 French-language comedy film written and directed by Francis Veber and starring Gad Elmaleh, Alice Taglioni, Daniel Auteuil and Kristin Scott Thomas. The film is about a parking valet who is enlisted to pretend to be the lover of a famous fashion model in order to deflect attention from her relationship with a married businessman. The film enjoyed box office success in France and the United States.

The Valet was remade as the 2009 Hindi film Do Knot Disturb, which in turn inspired the 2014 Punjabi film Disco Singh and the 2016 Bengali movie Haripad Bandwala. An English-language remake, The Valet, was released on 20 May 2022 by Hulu.

== Plot ==
Pierre Levasseur is a wealthy married Parisian executive involved in an affair with top model Elena Simonsen. When a paparazzo catches the two of them departing their secret hideaway and their photograph is published on the front page of the local newspaper, Pierre's wife Christine confronts him. He claims he has no idea who the woman is, and that she must have been a companion of the man seen walking beside them. Fully aware of Pierre's difficult situation, Elena gives him an ultimatum: he must choose between her and his wife. Because Christine is the majority shareholder of his business, Pierre is in danger of losing his fortune if he divorces her. His lawyer Maître Foix advises him the only way to resolve the issue is to find the anonymous man in the photo and have him pose as Elena's lover.

The anonymous man is the hapless François Pignon, a parking valet who is in love with bookstore owner Émilie. Deep in debt and worried about her business, she has turned down his marriage proposal because she believes she has too much on her plate, and thinks of him as a brother. Meanwhile, Maître Foix locates François and offers him money to let Elena move in with him and pretend they are a couple. François agrees and asks for 32,450 euros: the exact amount of money that will pay off Émilie's debts. Meanwhile, Elena demands 20 million euros to participate in the sham relationship, a sum she keeps as a deposit that she will return to Pierre when he leaves his wife. Dislodging his friend and roommate Richard, Elena moves in with François, who is overwhelmed by the situation, but the two quickly become friends.

Christine is not fooled and plays the situation for all it is worth, making her husband jealous of François and Elena's living situation. Émilie, too, is confused and upset to see François and Elena together. Eventually, Elena explains the situation to Émilie, who is grateful for the funding François requested for her, and she acquires a newfound respect for him and eventually accepts François' proposal.

In the meantime, Christine secretly tape records Pierre saying he has no intention of leaving her for Elena and offering to take his wife on a second honeymoon. When she sends the tape to Elena, Elena decides to leave Pierre. She notifies Pierre of her leaving by sending François to meet him in her car at a secret rendezvous point. François conveys the news to Pierre who angrily responds that he has voided the 20 million euro transfer. François then tells Pierre that Elena anticipated this of him and indicates that she never wanted the money implying that Elena leaves the relationship with a clean split. François then walks away from the limo as a cross-dressing prostitute approaches Pierre and the two are photographed by a paparazzo.

== Cast ==
- Daniel Auteuil as Pierre Levasseur
- Richard Berry as Lawyer Foix
- Gad Elmaleh as François Pignon
- Alice Taglioni as Elena Simonsen
- Kristin Scott Thomas as Christine Levasseur
- Virginie Ledoyen as Émilie
- Dany Boon as Richard
- Michèle Garcia as Louise
- Michel Aumont as Doctor
- Michel Jonasz as André Pignon
- Noémie Lenoir as Karine
- Laurent Gamelon as Paul
- Karl Lagerfeld as Himself
- Ellie Harvie as Restaurant Manager

== Production ==
François Pignon also is the name of the protagonist in screenwriter-director Francis Veber's films Les Compères (1983), The Dinner Game (1998) and The Closet (2001), although the characters are not the same person. The film also makes a reference to The Dinner Game during a scene. François gives his father, André, a corkscrew as a birthday present. André then mentions that he has even been invited to dinner to talk about his passion and collection of corkscrews.

The film was shot on location in Boulogne-Billancourt, Neuilly-sur-Seine, and Puteaux, all located in the département of Hauts-de-Seine.

== Critical reception ==
Stephen Holden of The New York Times called the film "a delectable comedy" and added, "Francis Veber ... is a master of the modern French farce. And this film has the same tight structure and carefully plotted surprises and reversals as his earlier comedies The Dinner Game and The Closet. These movies are wonderfully frothy contrivances, built with traditional machinery from models that have been around for centuries ... Because its structure and the targets of its satire—vanity, greed and lust—hark back to Molière, The Valet offers a reassuring vision of a fixed social order, bourgeois to the core, in which virtue is rewarded and hubris exposed."

Mick LaSalle of the San Francisco Chronicle called it "an enjoyable farce, with lots of laughs and a strong cast." He observed, "At 80 minutes long, it's that rare case of a short film that should have been longer. And that's its problem: It really should have been longer. This is not just a matter of wishing the pleasure might have been extended. The comparative shortness is indicative, rather, of the movie's sole flaw: Veber doesn't know how to end his movie. True, he knows how the audience would like the story to resolve, and he does get there. But he doesn't find a mechanically interesting way to do it. After putting this wonderful machinery in place, he more or less just pulls the plug. He ties things up quickly with a couple of pleasant but lackluster scenes and gets out, leaving the movie feeling truncated. Fine. If he couldn't come up with a great ending, at least he didn't belabor it, and along the way The Valet is a total pleasure."

Kenneth Turan of the Los Angeles Times said, "Making people laugh is the specialty of the house where French writer-director Francis Veber is concerned, and he is awfully good at it. A complete master of cinematic farce, Veber's latest venture ... makes creating deliciously funny comedy look a lot easier than it has any right to ... While some of the sight gags on view in The Valet have roots that go back to the great silent clowns, Veber's innate understanding of what makes people laugh, his gift for impeccable timing and for getting his cast to work together like interlocking parts of a fine machine, are difficult to resist."

Lisa Nesselson of Variety said, "Even though you can hear the clockwork mechanism ticking, comic craftsman Francis Veber ... has tooled another bigscreen timepiece with a fun premise and satisfying quotient of laughs."

== Box office ==
The film was released in France and Belgium on March 20, 2006. It was shown at the Moscow Film Festival, the Vancouver International Film Festival, ShoWest, and the Cleveland International Film Festival before going into limited release in the US on April 20, 2007. The film eventually grossed $1,926,800 in the US and $27,400,068 in foreign markets for a total worldwide box office of $29,326,868.

== Accolades ==
Dany Boon was nominated for the César Award for Best Actor in a Supporting Role. Alice Taglioni won the NRJ Ciné Award for Actress of the Year.

== Remakes ==
The film was remade in Hindi as Do Knot Disturb in 2009, starring Govinda, Sushmita Sen, Riteish Deshmukh, Lara Dutta. Do Knot Disturb later inspired the 2014 Punjabi movie Disco Singh and the 2016 Bengali movie Haripad Bandwala.

An English-language remake of the same name (The Valet (2022 film)) has also been made. DreamWorks bought the rights to an English-language remake soon after the film's release in 2006, with the Farrelly Brothers attached to direct and Allan Loeb attached as the writer and executive producer. However, nothing came of this project. In 2014 Eugenio Derbez gained the rights to a remake. In 2018 Rob Greenberg and Bob Fisher were hired to write and direct the film starred by Derbez. In may of 2022, it was finally released on Hulu.
