= Les Compères =

- Directed by: Francis Veber
- Written by: Francis Veber
- Produced by: Jean-Claude Bourlat
- Starring: Gérard Depardieu; Pierre Richard
- Cinematography: Claude Agostini
- Edited by: Marie-Sophie Dubus
- Music by: Vladimir Cosma
- Distributed by: European International
- Release dates: 23 November 1983 (France); 1 March 1984 (U.S.)
- Running time: 92 minutes
- Country: France
- Language: French

Les Compères (French: [le kɔ̄pɛʁ]; English title: ComDads) is a 1983 French comedy film written and directed by Francis Veber, and starring Gérard Depardieu, Pierre Richard and Anny Duperey. It is the second of three comedies that paired Depardieu and Richard under Veber's direction, following La Chèvre (1981) and preceding Les Fugitifs (1986).

The film was a box-office hit in France. In 1997, it was remade as the American film Fathers' Day, starring Billy Crystal and Robin Williams in roles based on those originally played by Depardieu and Richard.

== Plot ==
A teenage boy has run away from home. His father is ineffective at finding him, so his mother contacts two former lovers from around the time her son was conceived, telling them both that the child is their son and asking them to look for him. One of them (Depardieu) is a tough journalist investigating the Mafia, while the other (Richard) is a timid former teacher who was on the verge of committing suicide when he received the telephone call. The two former boyfriends finally meet, and together they locate the son. They both argue who the father really is. In the end the son tells both Depardieu and Richard (while the other is out of earshot) that his mother thinks that he is the father. Thus, the son adopts both of them as his fathers, and also reconciles with his real father.

== Cast ==
- Pierre Richard — François Pignon
- Gérard Depardieu — Jean Lucas
- Anny Duperey — Christine
- Michel Aumont — Paul
- Stephane Bierry — Tristan
- Roland Blanche — Jeannot
- Philippe Khorsand — Milan
- Jean-Jacques Scheffer — Ralph

== Reception ==
Les Compères was a major box-office success in France, where it sold 4,847,229 admissions. When it was released in the U.S. in the summer of 1984, it received negative reviews from many critics. Siskel & Ebert gave it two resounding "thumbs down" marks on their TV show, stating that the movie was "basically a French sitcom" and had too many stupid characters.
