= The Valet (2022 film) =

Film by Richard Wong

- Release poster
- Directed by: Richard Wong
- Screenplay by: Bob Fisher; Rob Greenberg
- Based on: The Valet by Francis Veber
- Produced by: Eugenio Derbez; Ben Odell
- Starring: Eugenio Derbez; Samara Weaving
- Cinematography: Mateo Londono
- Edited by: Sandra Montiel
- Music by: Heitor Pereira
- Production companies: Lionsgate; 3Pas Studios
- Distributed by: Hulu
- Release date: May 20, 2022
- Running time: 123 minutes
- Country: United States
- Language: English

The Valet is a 2022 American romantic comedy film directed by Richard Wong and written by Bob Fisher and Rob Greenberg. It is a remake of the French film The Valet (2006) by Francis Veber. It stars Eugenio Derbez and Samara Weaving, with Max Greenfield, Betsy Brandt, Marisol Nichols, Amaury Nolasco, Carmen Salinas, Noemi Gonzalez, Armando Hernández, Carlos Santos, Ravi Patel, and John Pirruccello in supporting roles. The film is dedicated to Salinas, who died in 2021. The plot follows a parking valet (Derbez) who is hired to date an actress (Weaving) trying to cover up an affair. The film was released on Hulu on May 20, 2022. It received generally positive reviews from critics.

== Plot ==
Antonio Flores is a humble valet living with his mother Cecilia. He is separated from his wife Isabel, and shares custody of their teenage son. His neighborhood is under threat of upcoming gentrification plans, which local bike shop owner Natalie is trying to fight.

Meanwhile, actress Olivia Allan is having an affair with city developer and married billionaire Vincent Royce. One night, when she is getting into her Uber with Vincent standing next to her, Antonio crashes his bike into the car. The three are photographed together, sparking rumors of Olivia and Vincent's affair.

Fearing he will lose his company if his wife Kathryn divorces him, Vincent comes up with a plan to have Olivia and Antonio pretend to be a couple. She accepts to avoid any bad press before the upcoming premiere of her new film, Earhart, in which she stars as Amelia Earhart. Antonio requests $12,850 to pay for Isabel's debts.

Antonio and Olivia go out for lunch surrounded by paparazzi, where Olivia is rude and calculating, and Antonio feels out of place. Everybody falls for the ploy, except for Kathryn, who hires a private investigator to tail them. At the premiere of Earhart, she questions Antonio, who stands up for himself when she criticizes his occupation.

As he leaves the event, Antonio realizes that he has become famous, especially within the Latin American community. He and his friends drive a drunk Olivia home to avoid any unflattering paparazzi photos.

The next day, Olivia is given a proper breakfast by Antonio's family. She admires their closeness and love for each other. Vincent is incorrectly led to believe that Antonio and Olivia slept together, making him jealous.

Earhart receives positive reviews after the premiere but Olivia is lonely and unsure of Vincent's promise to leave his wife. She attends Antonio's son's play at school. Out of jealousy, Isabel kisses Antonio, who tells her the truth about Olivia.

Antonio and Olivia bond, and she enjoys her anonymity in the Latin-American neighborhood. Back home, they pretend to have sex to mess with private investigators observing them from across the street. Cecilia tells Antonio she is glad he has found love again, like she has with their Korean landlord Mr. Kim, even though neither can speak the same language. Olivia acknowledges that she has not been living a healthy lifestyle.

The following day, Isabel tells Antonio that she wants to file for divorce, because she does not want to be with someone who thinks so little of himself. Olivia and Antonio fight over each of their self-destructive tendencies—her aloofness and his self-deprecation—and they publicly "break up".

Vincent's lawyer later approaches Antonio to pay him $25,000, explaining that he grew up like Antonio and he is happy whenever he can do the right thing. Antonio hesitates, but takes the money.

Cecilia suffers a stroke and dies in the kitchen with Mr. Kim at her side. At the funeral, Antonio delivers a heartfelt eulogy about the hardships his mother endured to give him and his siblings a better life in the United States, and thanks Mr. Kim for giving her happiness. He speaks in English so Mr. Kim's family can translate.

Antonio makes up with Olivia, who decides to break up with Vincent. Kathryn learns the truth about Vincent, files for divorce, and takes over the company. To thank Antonio, she cancels the gentrification plans.

Antonio builds up the courage to ask out Natalie. The film closes with Antonio and Olivia discussing Antonio's love life while the paparazzi take photos from the street.

== Cast ==
- Eugenio Derbez as Antonio Flores, a valet
- Samara Weaving as Olivia Allan, a Hollywood actress
- Max Greenfield as Vincent Royce, Kathryn's husband
- Betsy Brandt as Kathryn Royce, a billionaire
- Marisol Nichols as Isabel, Antonio's ex-wife
- Amaury Nolasco as Benny, Antonio's brother-in-law
- Carmen Salinas as Cecilia, Antonio's mother
- Noemi Gonzalez as Clara, Antonio's sister
- Armando Hernández as Rudy, a valet
- Carlos Santos as Javier, a valet
- Wilmer Calderon as Hugo, a pool guy
- Ravi Patel as Kapoor, a private investigator hired by Vincent
- John Pirruccello as Stegman, a private investigator hired by Kathryn
- Diany Rodriguez as Natalie, the owner of a bicycle repair and seller shop
- Tiana Okoye as Amanda, Olivia's assistant
- Ji Yong Lee as Mr. Kim, Cecilia's lover and Antonio's landlord
- Lunay as The Limo Driver

== Production ==
In September 2014, it was announced Eugenio Derbez would produce and star in a remake of the 2006 French film The Valet by Francis Veber, with Lionsgate set to distribute. In March 2021, it was announced Samara Weaving had joined the cast of the film, with Richard Wong set to direct from a screenplay by Bob Fisher and Rob Greenberg. The rest of the cast was revealed in April and May. Filming took place in Atlanta, Georgia. During post-production, Heitor Pereira composed the musical score. The Valet is the last film to star Carmen Salinas, who died in December 2021; the film is dedicated to her memory.

== Release ==
In July 2021, Hulu acquired U.S. distribution rights to the film, with Disney+ set to distribute internationally and Star+ in Latin America. It was released on May 20, 2022.

== Reception ==
=== Audience viewership ===
According to Whip Media's TV Time, The Valet was the tenth-most-watched film across all platforms in the United States during the week of May 20, 2022.

=== Critical reception ===
On the review aggregator website Rotten Tomatoes, 75% of 65 reviews are positive, with an average rating of 6.4/10. The website's critical consensus reads, "With a pair of likable leads and a story that subverts rom-com expectations, The Valet is a rare remake worth celebrating." Metacritic, which uses a weighted average, assigned a score of 62 out of 100 based on nine critics, indicating "generally favorable reviews".

John Serba of Decider called The Valet a funny and heartwarming film and compared it to Notting Hill, stating it avoids to be a formulaic romantic comedy film, praised the interactions between the characters and their development, and complimented the performances of the cast members. Sheila O'Malley of RogerEbert.com rated the film three out of four stars, complimented the humor of the film and the performances of the cast, and praised its take on the treatment of workers by the upper-class across gentrification. Jennifer Green of Common Sense Media rated the film 4 out of 5 stars, praised the depiction of positive messages, citing friendship and self-respect, complimented the presence of positive role models, stating the movie promotes integrity and humility across some of the characters, and found agreeable the diversity of the cast members.

Jacob Oller of Paste rated the film 7.9/10, applauded the screenplay for its approach on feminism and multiculturalism across Derbez and Weaving's characters, complimented The Valet for its modern humor across its gags, stating it manages to be entertaining without relying on pop culture, and praised the actors for their performances. Rachel Labonte of Screen Rant gave the movie a three out of five stars review and found it to be a refreshing romantic comedy film, stating the lead characters manage to both be interestingly developed across their relationships while the movie approaches the harsh treatment of immigrants by the upper class, praised the performances of the actors, and declared it manages to be entertaining across its genuine humor despite saying some subplots are not developed sufficiently.

=== Accolades ===
At the Imagen Awards, the film received nominations for "Best Primetime Program – Special or Movie" and "Best Actor – Comedy (Television)" (for Eugenio Derbez).
