= Gary Armagnac =

American actor

Gary Armagnac is an American actor active in the 1980s and early 1990s. His most notable role was as Lieutenant McNary in Star Trek: The Next Generation. He has been a professional actor, director, and educator for more than thirty years.

Mr. Armagnac was the artist in residence and director of education for five seasons with the Tony Award® winning Utah Shakespeare Festival (USF). His work on stage there included the title roles in Richard III and Pericles, Iago in Othello, and Sir Toby in Twelfth Night. He also directed productions of Macbeth, Hamlet, and Romeo & Juliet that toured to communities throughout the southwest.

He received a CINE Golden Eagle Award in 1998 for Shakes: Rattle & Role, a documentary he wrote and directed for public television about his touring production of Hamlet. Other awards for his work include Hollywood Drama-Logue Awards for his portrayals of Dylan Thomas in Dylan, the title role in Macbeth, Iago in Othello, and for directing, lighting, and sets for his Los Angeles production of Twelfth Night.

Currently, Mr. Armagnac is a professor at University of the Pacific in Stockton, California, where he is the head of the acting program. His television/film credits include guest starring roles on Star Trek: The Next Generation, LA Law, Hill Street Blues, Houston Knights, The Adventures of Brisco County, Jr, Three Fugitives, and the Coen brothers’ Blood Simple.
