= The Toy (1976 film) =

- Directed by: Francis Veber
- Written by: Francis Veber
- Produced by: Claude Berri; Pierre Grunstein; Pierre Richard
- Starring: Pierre Richard; Michel Bouquet
- Cinematography: Étienne Becker
- Edited by: Robert Laloux
- Music by: Vladimir Cosma
- Production companies: Andrea Films; EFVE; Fideline Films; Renn Productions
- Distributed by: AMLF
- Release date: December 8, 1976
- Running time: 95 minutes
- Country: France
- Language: French

The Toy (French: Le Jouet) is a 1976 French comedy-drama film directed by Francis Veber.

The film was remade in 1982 as the American film The Toy. In 2022 it received a French remake, The New Toy.

== Plot ==
The movie tells the story of a little boy who is trying to prove his father wrong by acting exactly like him. His father "buys" people and nothing can stop him from getting what he wants. His son does not see why he cannot do the same and decides to buy a man, who he encountered at the toy shop. The man he chose happened to be a journalist at his father's newspaper. Gradually with the help of his “toy” the boy manages to prove his father's wrong deeds by exposing them in the newspaper produced by him and his "toy". Along this journey, the boy establishes warm relationships with the man and refuses to stay with his father any longer. The message behind the story is that love and respect matter more than money.

== Cast ==
- Pierre Richard as François Perrin
- Michel Bouquet as Pierre Rambal-Cochet
- Fabrice Greco as Eric Rambal-Cochet
- Jacques François as Blénac
- Michel Aumont as Le directeur du magasin
- Gérard Jugnot as Pignier
- Éva Darlan as The Press Secretary
- Michel Robin as The domestic
- Charles Gérard as The photographer
- Yves Barsacq as Robert
