= Michel Strogoff (miniseries) =

- Written by: Claude Desailly
- Directed by: Jean-Pierre Decourt
- Starring: Raimund Harmstorf; Lorenza Guerrieri
- Composer: Vladimir Cosma
- Countries of origin: France; West Germany; Italy; Hungary; Belgium; Austria; Switzerland
- No. of seasons: 1
- No. of episodes: 7 (4 in Germany)

Production
- Producer: Alfred Nathan
- Cinematography: István Hildebrand
- Editors: Klaus Dudenhöfer; Brigitte Godon
- Running time: 7x55' or 4x90'

Original release
- Network: TF1
- Release: 23 December 1975 – January 1976
- Network: ZDF
- Release: 28 December 1976 – 6 January 1977

Michel Strogoff is a 1975 French / Italian / West German miniseries directed by Jean-Pierre Decourt. It is based on the novel of the same name by Jules Verne.

== Cast ==
- Raimund Harmstorf - Michel Strogoff
- Lorenza Guerrieri - Nadia Fedor
- Pierre Vernier - Alcide Jolivet
- Vernon Dobtcheff - Harry Blount
- Rada Rassimov - Sangarre
- Valerio Popesco - Ivan Ogareff
- József Madaras - Feofar Khan
- Tibor Molnár - Nicolas Pigassof
- Tibor Tánczos - Tsar Alexander II
- Iván Szendrő - Vassili
- Péter Korbuly: Taizis
- János Kovács: Tzingos
- Géza Polgár: tartar chief
- Károly Vogt: tartar chief
- Teri Horváth: Marfa Strogoff
- Tibor Kenderesi: Fëdor
- Dénes Ujlaki: Taras
- Tibor Molnár: Nikolaj Pigasov
- Tibor Patassy: General Kissov
- László Csurka: Fischer
- Károly Mécs: Grand Duke Dimitri
- Ferenc Baracsi: General Woranzof
- István Jeney: Telegraphist

== UK Adaptation ==
An English language adaptation re-titled Michael Strogoff, directed by Louis Elm at De Lane Lea Studios was dubbed into English and re-edited into seven parts and broadcast on BBC television (BBC2) from 7 January 1981.
