= Cinema Statuto fire =

1983 movie theater fire in Turin, Italy

Coordinates: 45.07812°N 7.66576°E

- Date: February 13, 1983
- Time: 18:15
- Location: Turin, Italy
- Type: Building fire
- Cause: Inconclusive
- Deaths: 64
- Injuries: 20
- Convicted: Raimondo Capella (owner of cinema)

Cinema Statuto was a movie theater located in Turin, Italy, when on 13 February 1983, at 18:15, during the projection of La Chèvre, a fire caused the death of 64 people as a result of smoke inhalation. According to statements by Raimondo Capella, the owner of the cinema, the flames spread from an old curtain. This was the largest disaster to have occurred after World War II in Turin.

== Fire ==
At the time of the fire there were over 400 people in the theater. In February 2018 Barbara Guaschetti, one of the survivors, stated that the spectators sitting in the lower hall managed to escape through the main entrance and the only emergency exit at the ground floor that was not closed and locked. The owner of the cinema, Raimondo Capella, claimed that he and some employees attempted to put out the fires with fire extinguishers but were unable to do so and began opening exit doors and evacuating patrons. However, as remembered by one of the firefighters who was on the scene, they had to force open the emergency exits on the first floor because they were all locked.

Most of the victims were among the viewers sitting in the upper Gallery who did not realize what was happening till it was too late. The owner of the cinema did not turn the emergency lights on and did not stop the screening because he feared "a wave of panic." Those in the balcony who had tried to reach the stairs found that the only way out was already blocked by flames, others fled to the toilets and died there. A few bodies were found still seated.

== Victims ==
About sixty-four people were killed due to the fire and resulting panic in the evacuation, with about twenty deceased victims found huddled in a closet and bathrooms they believed to be stairwells. Some of the deceased, died due to fumes of Hydrogen cyanide, a product of combustion of fire-resistant fabric chairs. An additional twenty people were reported injured. The youngest victim was 7 years old, the oldest was 55 years old. Nine children were orphaned after their parents died in the fire.

== Legal ==
Raimondo Capella, was arrested on multiple charges of negligent homicide, and was sentenced to eight years in first grade, and two years in second grade, and to compensate the relatives of the victims with a sum of 3 billion of lire (€1.54 million). All his assets were seized.

== Aftermath ==
The accident prompted a wave of reforms in the laws about public buildings, making fireproof materials and firefighting equipment mandatory for every public space.
