= Three Fugitives =

1989 film by Francis Veber

- Theatrical release poster
- Directed by: Francis Veber
- Written by: Francis Veber
- Produced by: Lauren Shuler Donner
- Starring: Nick Nolte; Martin Short; James Earl Jones; Sarah Doroff
- Cinematography: Haskell Wexler
- Edited by: Bruce Green
- Music by: David McHugh
- Production companies: Touchstone Pictures; Silver Screen Partners IV
- Distributed by: Buena Vista Pictures Distribution
- Release date: January 27, 1989
- Running time: 96 minutes
- Country: United States
- Language: English
- Budget: $13-17 million
- Box office: $40.6 million

Three Fugitives is a 1989 American crime comedy film, written and directed by Francis Veber, starring Nick Nolte and Martin Short, with supporting roles by Sarah Doroff, James Earl Jones, Alan Ruck, and Kenneth McMillan in his final film appearance. It is a remake of Les Fugitifs, a 1986 French comedy starring Gérard Depardieu and Pierre Richard also directed by Veber.

The film follows a former notorious bank robber (Nolte) who, on the day he gets out of prison, is randomly taken hostage by another inexperienced bank robber (Short) while trying to cash his prison check, leading the police to assume he is behind it. A series of situations ensues as the pair try to evade capture from the police.

The film grossed more than $11.9 million its first two weeks of release at the box office. Despite this, it received a general negative reception from critics, with many citing its outdated comedy and overuse of violence and profanity.

== Plot ==
Daniel Lucas, a criminal convicted for armed robbery 5 years prior, is released from prison. Lucas hitches a ride with Detective Marvin Dugan, who drops him off at a bank Lucas sarcastically claims he will rob. As Lucas is opening an account, Ned Perry, an incompetent bank robber, arrives and holds up the bank. After an extended period of time attempting to grab a money bag from a chandelier, Perry takes Lucas hostage and takes him outside. After a shootout and chase with police, Perry reveals he robbed the bank to get money for treatment for his mute daughter, Meg.

Dugan, who has since led the manhunt on the two, assumes they must be in it together given Lucas' history, and sets about tracking them down. After stopping to release Lucas, Perry accidentally shoots Lucas in the leg, forcing him to seek treatment from a senile vet who thinks Lucas is a dog. Perry intends to leave the country with Meg, and Lucas refers him to an acquaintance who sells fake passports. When Perry arrives, the owner reveals to him that he has since raised the prices, of which Perry does not have enough. The owner promptly calls Lucas, telling him he will turn Perry into the police if the money is not delivered. Lucas then rescues Perry, and forces him to sign a confession proving Lucas' innocence.

When Lucas leaves to turn in the confession, Meg begs him to stay. Lucas refuses and walks away, prompting Meg to follow and arrive at a park. Perry follows and finds Lucas, who both hide in a bush as police wander the park. The two watch as an old man sits with Meg, and after conversing with her for a bit, turns her into the police, much to Perry's dismay, and put Meg in a care home.

Lucas turns in the confession slip, vindicating him and turning the manhunt fully on Perry. Lucas visits Meg, who has since refused to eat and talk after Lucas' departure, and Lucas leaves after giving Meg a stuffed animal. After leaving the home, Lucas stumbles upon Perry, who is still actively hiding from police. Refusing to not be able to see his daughter, Perry attempts to break into the care home, with Lucas joining him.

Lucas and Perry enter the care home, and after taking Meg, nearly alert the guard there and escape to a different room. As they begin to leave, the men realize the girl is not Meg, and she screams, alerting the guard and compromising the men's cover. The guard, who holds Perry at gunpoint, trips on a toy and drops her gun, which he picks up and forces her to find Meg for him and the men leave.

The three break into a home of a vacationing family, and after finding identification and passports, hatch a plan to impersonate the family and leave for Canada, with Lucas being the father, Perry being the mother, and after giving Meg a haircut, pass her off as the family's son. When the three hit a police roadblock, Lucas attempts to pass stating his "wife" is in labor. The police quickly escort them to a nearby hospital, and only after Perry is on the stretcher, he gets off and passes it off as a "nervous pregnancy".

The three later cross the border into Canada. As Perry enters a Canadian bank to change some currency, he finds himself taken hostage by a different bank robber in the same manner he originally kidnapped Lucas. Because of this unexpected development, Lucas, who originally intended to leave, stays with the two as the situation unfolds.

== Cast ==
- Nick Nolte as Daniel James Lucas
- Martin Short as Ned Perry
- Sarah Rowland Doroff as Megan "Meg" Perry
- Kenneth McMillan as Dr. Horvath
- Alan Ruck as Inspector Tener
- James Earl Jones as Inspector Marvin Dugan
- David Arnott as Bank Teller
- Bruce McGill as Charlie
- Lee Garlington as Constable Jane Karie
- Sy Richardson as Tucker
- Rocky Giordani as Bowles
- Stanley Brock as Release Sergent
- Rick Hall as Billy, Dog Handler
- Brian Thompson as Second Thug
- Jack McGee as Fisherman
- Kathy Kinney as Receptionist
- Larry Miller as Street Cop
- Jeff Perry as Orderly #2
- Dinah Lenney as Reporter #1
- John Aylward as Second Cop
- Tim De Zarn as First Cop
- Rhoda Gemignani as Radio Announcer
- Charles Noland as Dave, The Bartender
- Albert Henderson as Man In Raincoat
- Gary Armagnac as Cop #2
- Dean Smith as Barry "Playboy" Jones
- Mike MacDonald as Sergeant Snow
- Michael Siegel as Cop #4

== Production ==
In 1985, Francis Veber established a contractual relationship with Walt Disney Pictures beginning with him meeting with the American writers developing an adaptation of Veber's La Valise with Veber also set to executive produce. Disney offered Veber directing duties on Big Business, which would have marked Veber's first time directing from a script he had not written himself. Veber ultimately passed on Big Business as he would only be comfortable collaborating with an American writer citing an experience developing a project at Paramount Pictures that would've featured Eddie Murphy as an African King who is dethroned while visiting America with the project failing to gain momentum after Murphy's associates advised him against it. Jeffrey Katzenberg had acquired the remake rights to Veber's Les Fugitifs before the film had even started production.

Filming for the movie began on April 4, 1988 and wrapped on July 20, 1988. Filming locations included Los Angeles County Arboretum and Botanic Garden, Seattle, Washington and Tacoma, Washington

== Reception ==
Rotten Tomatoes gives the film a score of 14% based on 14 reviews. On Metacritic it has a score of 40% based on reviews from 18 critics, indicating "mixed or average reviews".

Variety says the "Clever premise starts pic off on a roll" but "As for the Nolte-Short pairing, it'll do, but it’s no chemical marvel. Nolte, not really a comic natural, gruffs and grumbles his way through as hunky straight man to Short's calamitous comedian."
