= Frédéric Sojcher =

Belgian film director and screenwriter (born 1967)

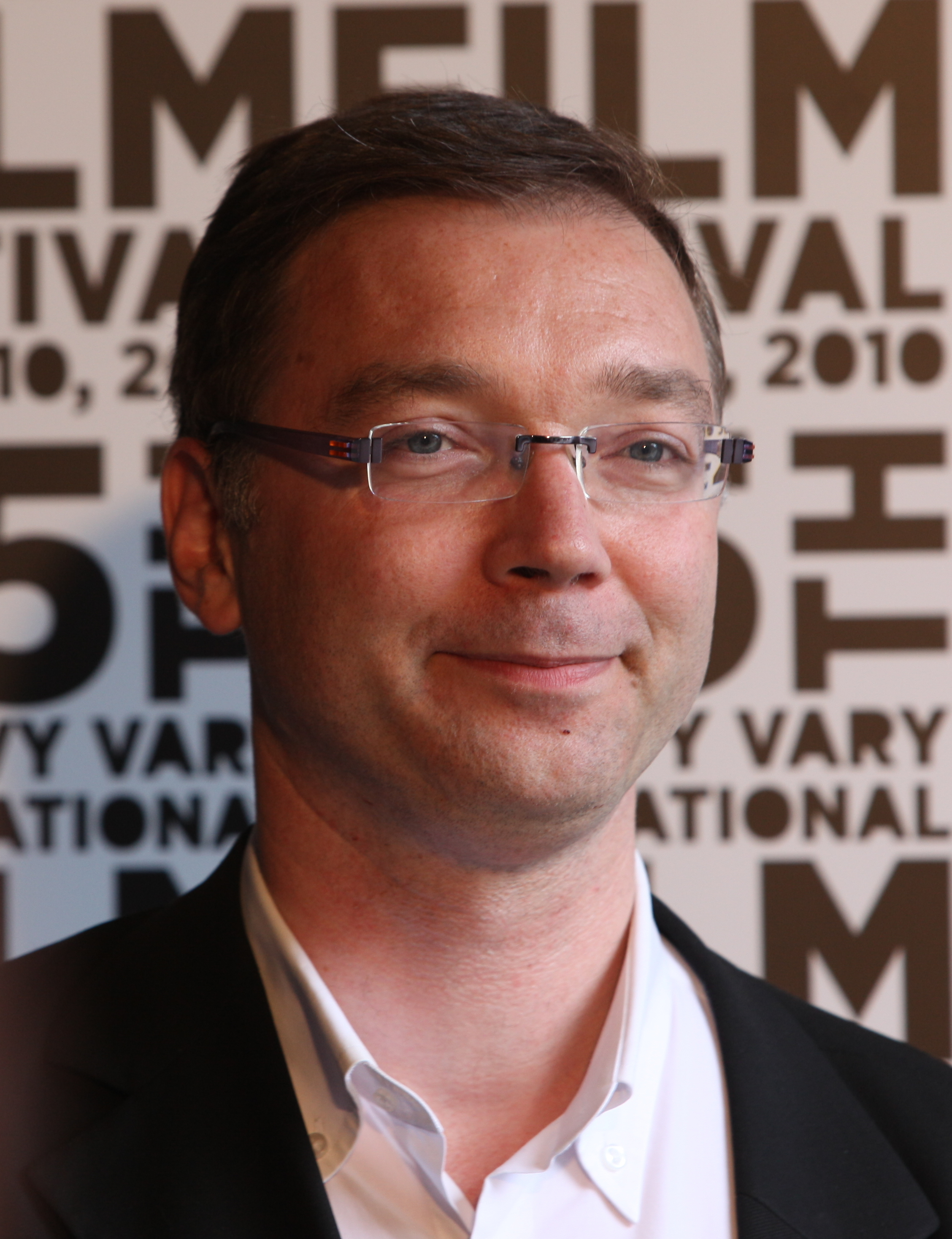
- Frédéric Sojcher at 2010 Karlovy Vary International Film Festival
- Born: 1967 (age 58–59); Brussels, Belgium
- Occupation: Film director

Frédéric Sojcher (born 1967) is a Belgian film director, writer and screenwriter.

Already at the age of 16, he made his first steps as a director and created a short film with the support of CBA. Two years later, he filmed Fumeurs de charme with Serge Gainsbourg and Michael Lonsdale.

In 1996, he received the European Prize for the best thesis on cinema by the Italian critics’ union.

Sojcher is the director of the master's programme in screenwriting and directing at the Paris 1 Panthéon-Sorbonne University.

As an author, he has published more than 30 books on cinema.

== Filmography ==
- Regarde-moi, 2000 feature film;
- Cinéastes à tout prix, 2004 feature film, selected in the Official section at Cannes;
- Hitler à Hollywood, 2010 feature film, selected in the Venice Days section at Venice FF;
- Je veux être actrice, 2016 feature film.
- Le Cours de la Vie, 2023, Cineuropa Award at the Love International Film Festival Mons.

== Selected bibliography ==
- L’Harmattan, 1999;
- Main basse sur le film, 2005;
- le Manifeste du cineaste, 2009;
- Le Fantôme de Truffaut, 2016.
