= L'Emmerdeur =

1973 French-Italian black comedy film

L'emmerdeur
- Theatrical release poster
- Directed by: Édouard Molinaro
- Written by: Francis Veber (play and screenplay)
- Produced by: Georges Dancigers; Alexandre Mnouchkine
- Starring: Jacques Brel; Lino Ventura; Caroline Cellier
- Cinematography: Raoul Coutard
- Edited by: Monique Isnardon; Robert Isnardon
- Music by: Jacques Brel; François Rauber
- Production companies: Les Films Ariane; Mondex Films; Oceania Produzioni; Rizzoli Film
- Distributed by: Compagnie Commerciale Française Cinématographique (CCFC)
- Release date: 20 September 1973 (France)
- Running time: 85 minutes
- Countries: France; Italy
- Language: French
- Box office: $25.2 million

L'Emmerdeur (also known under the English-language title A Pain in the Ass) is a 1973 French-Italian black comedy film, starring Jacques Brel—appearing in his tenth and final feature film—and Lino Ventura. Directed by Édouard Molinaro and co-starring Caroline Cellier and Jean-Pierre Darras, L'Emmerdeur is an adaptation of Francis Veber's 1971 play Le contrat.

In the film, a hit man (Ventura) waits for his intended victim at a hotel room, but his plan is accidentally thwarted by the suicidal salesman (Brel) occupying the neighboring room. He resorts to prevent the salesman from committing suicide, in fear that the suicide would cause a police search in the hotel.

== Plot ==
Ralph Milan is a contract killer who is paid to kill Louis Randoni, whose testimony in various trials could harm the organisation. Ralph waits for his prey in his hotel room, but is interrupted by his neighbor, a shirt salesman named François Pignon.

Pignon, who is suicidal since his wife left him for a reputed psychiatrist named Fuchs (Jean-Pierre Darras), tries to hang himself on the waterpipes, but only manages to cause a flood. Realizing that if Pignon tries to kill himself again, the police will search the place, Milan offers to talk him out of it until after his assassination. Unfortunately Pignon starts irritating him more, and makes it more difficult for him to fulfill his contract killing.

== Cast ==
- Jacques Brel as François Pignon
- Lino Ventura as Ralf Milan
- Caroline Cellier as Louise Pignon
- Jean-Pierre Darras as Fuchs
- Nino Castelnuovo as The bellhop
- Angela Cardile as The future mother
- Xavier Depraz as Louis Randoni
- Jean-Louis Tristan as The hotel inspector
- André Valardy as The hitchhiker
- Jean Franval as The hitchhiker
- Pierre Collet as The butcher
- Arlette Balkis as The patient
- Éric Vasberg as The rally pilot
- Jacques Galland as Maître Chamfort
- François Dyrek

== Production ==
Filming took place in Montpellier, as well as in Castries and Saint-Jean-de-Védas.

== Remakes ==
The film was remade in the United States in 1981 as Buddy Buddy by Billy Wilder, starring Jack Lemmon and Walter Matthau. This American remake was a commercial and critical failure. In 2005, Francis Veber, author of the original play, reproposed it in an updated version using the film's title and starring Patrick Timsit and Richard Berry. The play was a success with audiences, which prompted Veber to direct a remake of the film, with Timsit and Berry reprising their roles. The French remake was released in 2008, and flopped at the box office.

The film also remade in Turkish as Baş Belası in 1982 directed by Kartal Tibet.

A remake in Hindi titled Bumboo was released in 2012.
