= Ruby & Quentin =

- French theatrical release poster
- Directed by: Francis Veber
- Written by: Francis Veber (scenario, adaptation & dialogue); Serge Frydman (idea)
- Produced by: Saïd Ben Saïd
- Starring: Jean Reno; Gérard Depardieu
- Cinematography: Luciano Tovoli
- Edited by: Georges Klotz
- Music by: Marco Prince
- Production companies: UGC Images; DD Productions; EFVE Films; TF1 Films Production; Filmauro
- Distributed by: UGC Fox Distribution
- Release date: 22 October 2003
- Running time: 87 minutes
- Countries: France; Italy
- Language: French
- Budget: €26.7 million
- Box office: $22.3 million

Ruby & Quentin (French: Tais-toi! (French pronunciation: [tɛ twa], Shut up!) is a 2003 French comedy-crime caper film, directed by Francis Veber.

== Cast ==
- Jean Reno as Ruby
- Gérard Depardieu as Quentin
- Richard Berry as Vernet
- André Dussollier as The psychiatrist
- Jean-Pierre Malo as Vogel
- Jean-Michel Noirey as Lambert
- Laurent Gamelon as Mauricet
- Aurélien Recoing as Rocco
- Vincent Moscato as Raffi
- Ticky Holgado as Martineau
- Michel Aumont as Nosberg
- Léonor Varela as Katia/Sandra
- Loïc Brabant as Jambier
- Arnaud Cassand as Bourgoin
- Edgar Givry as Vavinet
- Guy Delamarch as Lefevre
- Rebecca Potok as Madame Lefevre
- Jean Dell as The radiologist
- Guillaume de Tonquédec as The hospital's intern
- Adrien Saint-Joré & Johan Libéreau as Teenagers

== Plot ==
Quentin, a dim-witted small-time thief, holds up a foreign exchange booth. Unable to get the money he wants, he asks for directions to the nearest bank. When the police are given this tip-off, Quentin runs into a cinema where Ice Age is showing. He is caught when instead of continuing to run, he sits down and enjoys the film.

Ruby, a henchman of the crime lord Vogel, has been having an affair with his boss' wife. Vogel kills her. Ruby is thrown into jail after being caught hiding the loot that he stole from his boss in revenge for the death of his lover.

In jail Ruby refuses to eat or speak, which concerns the jail's psychiatrist but fails to impress the detective in charge of the investigation, who sees through the ruse. Meanwhile in the same jail Quentin has been moved from cell to cell repeatedly - every time he's put in with a new cellmate his endless dimwitted yammering ends up with the man sharing his cell attacking him.

Ruby is still staying silent. Then the investigator has an idea: Quentin, the intolerable extrovert who has driven his other cellmates out of their mind with irritation, is put in with Ruby. Quentin adores Ruby - Ruby's eyes, fixed on the distance as he sits there in silence, remind Quentin of the lovely horses he worked with as a stable boy. They are parted after Ruby fakes suicide to get out. Quentin does the same and ends up in the bed next to Ruby in the prison infirmary.

Ruby manages to bribe the psychiatric nurse (who also works for Vogel) into helping him escape. Quentin has his own plan: they'll escape with help from a drunken long-time friend who drives a crane.

Vogel's bodyguards tried to catch Ruby three times. Ruby and Quentin steal two of Vogel's cars and his bodyguards get them back. Ruby is desperate to get rid of Quentin, but every attempt goes wrong. They break into a mansion to steal some clothes, but the owner is a former jockey, half their size. They dressing in his wife's Chanel outfits, then change clothes with two homophobes. Quentin steals a series of police cars and after Ruby dislocates his shoulder, puts it back into the socket.

They make a run for Quentin's home village, and in the derelict bistro where Quentin plans to open a café one day, they meet a homeless woman who has a striking similarity to Vogel's dead wife. Ruby falls for her, gives her some money and drops her off at a hotel to give her a new start.

They blag their way into Vogel's lair and a shoot-out results in an incapacitated Vogel, and Quentin supposedly mortally wounded. Ruby, as much to his own surprise as anyone else's, expresses his grief for Quentin, who tricks him into actually promising to open a bistro with him after he recovers.
