= Fathers' Day (1997 film) =

- Theatrical release poster
- Directed by: Ivan Reitman
- Screenplay by: Lowell Ganz; Babaloo Mandel
- Based on: Les Compères by Francis Veber
- Produced by: Ivan Reitman; Joel Silver
- Starring: Robin Williams; Billy Crystal; Julia Louis-Dreyfus; Nastassja Kinski
- Cinematography: Stephen H. Burum
- Edited by: Wendy Greene Bricmont; Sheldon Kahn
- Music by: James Newton Howard
- Production companies: Silver Pictures; Northern Lights Entertainment
- Distributed by: Warner Bros.
- Release date: May 9, 1997
- Running time: 98 minutes
- Country: United States
- Language: English
- Budget: $85 million
- Box office: $35.7 million

Fathers' Day is a 1997 American comedy film directed by Ivan Reitman and starring Robin Williams, Billy Crystal, Julia Louis-Dreyfus, and Nastassja Kinski. It is a remake of the 1983 French film Les Compères.

In the film, Collette Andrews (Kinski) enlists two former lovers, cynical lawyer Jack Lawrence (Crystal) and lonely, ex-hippie, suicidal writer Dale Putley (Williams) to help her search for her runaway teenage son Scott by telling each man that he is the father. When Jack and Dale run into each other and find out what is happening, they work together to find Scott and determine the identity of the actual father.

The film features an appearance by the musical groups Sugar Ray and the Muffs. It was released by Warner Bros. on May 9, 1997 and was a critical and commercial failure, grossing $35.7 million against an $85 million budget.

== Plot ==
16-year-old Scott Andrews runs away from home with his girlfriend Nikki. His mother, Collette, visits her first ex-boyfriend, lawyer Jack Lawrence, telling him that Scott is really his son, and she wants him to find Scott. Jack refuses at first but changes his mind when work keeps him overnight in San Francisco.

Meanwhile, writer Dale Putley is attempting suicide when he gets a phone call from Collette, of whom he is another second ex-boyfriend, and she tells him the same story.

Both men start their search with Russ, Nikki's father. Dale and Jack get little help from him, but it does lead to them meeting each other. Mistakenly assuming that they each have a different missing son, they think "both boys" are mixed up with Nikki. They decide to team up.

Jack and Dale visit Nikki's mother Shirley, learning that Nikki went on the road to follow rock band Sugar Ray. When she asks to see pictures of their sons, they finally discover that Collette has told them both the same story about being Scott's father. They call her, and she confesses that she does not know which man is the father, but she begs them to find Scott.

The two agree, and they head for Sacramento, finding Scott, drunk, lovestruck and dumped by Nikki. They bring him to their hotel room, but when he awakens the next day, he is not pleased by the news that one of them might be his father nor that Nikki is following Sugar Ray. Jack leaves Dale to watch Scott, but he escapes by pouring coffee on Dale's lap. Dale finds Jack, and they head to Reno, to Sugar Ray's next gig.

In Reno, Scott meets with Nikki and the other groupies. Bumping into two drug dealers who he scammed out of $5,000 to buy a necklace for Nikki, Scott escapes, only to be accidentally run down by Jack and Dale. Now with a broken arm, Scott demands that they leave him alone.

That night, the three finally bond when Scott opens up to Jack and Dale; Nikki is his first love, but his parents disapprove of her, so he ran away. When Scott tells him about the drug dealers, they try to help him. They drive to Nikki's hotel, but when Jack and Dale go inside, the drug dealers spot Scott in the car and plan to kidnap and kill him. Scott escapes in Jack's rental car.

When the two fathers emerge from the hotel, Jack assumes that Scott had been lying to them the whole time and quits, deciding to go home. However, his wife Carrie appears, following him (and Dale) because she is confused and concerned over Jack's odd behavior. He tells her the truth about Scott, that he could be the father.

Dale departs while Jack and Carrie argue about Jack's negative feelings for Scott, making her fear how he will react with his own child. Understanding her point, he heads to the Sugar Ray concert, finding Dale, who is also looking for Scott. They find him as he confronts Nikki, who breaks up with him. Heartbroken, Scott is suddenly grabbed by the drug dealers, who Dale and Jack attack, resulting in a huge fight erupting in the concert crowd.

Freed from jail the next day, Jack, Dale and Scott head home, where Collette and his father Bob embrace their son. She tells Scott that neither Jack nor Dale is his dad, but he is touched that his parents wanted him home so badly. Before Jack and Dale go, Scott lies to both, separately and privately, that they are the father. Jack realizes that Scott lied, but is happy because he now has a positive view of having children.

Having borrowed Jack's car to get to the airport, Dale spots a woman having car trouble. Discovering that Virginia is single and also heading to San Francisco, Dale offers her a lift by car, to Jack's annoyance.

== Cast ==
- Robin Williams as Dale Putley, Jack's partner and Scott's possible father
- Billy Crystal as Jack Lawrence, Dale's partner and Scott's possible father
- Julia Louis-Dreyfus as Carrie Lawrence, Jack's wife
- Nastassja Kinski as Collette Andrews, Scott's mother
- Charlie Hofheimer as Scott Andrews
- Bruce Greenwood as Bob Andrews, Scott's father
- Jared Harris as Lee
- Louis Lombardi as Matt
- Patti D'Arbanville as Shirley Trainor, Nikki's mother
- Haylie Johnson as Nikki Trainor, Scott's girlfriend
- Charles Rocket as Russ Trainor, Nikki's father
- Claudette Wells as Ms. Tweesbury
- Paul Herman as Mr. Barmore
- Jason Reitman as Wrong Kid in Alley
- Catherine Reitman as Victoria
- Caroline Reitman as Lost Girl
- Sugar Ray as themselves
- Mary McCormack as Virginia, Dale's love interest (uncredited)
- Mel Gibson as Scott the Body Piercer (cameo)

== Production ==
Attempts had been made to remake Francis Veber's Les Compères since the mid 1980s when the project was originally in development with 20th Century Fox. After a first draft that adhered very closely to the original was rejected for feeling overly leaden, National Lampoon writer Tod Carroll wrote a subsequent draft that only kept the basic premise about two men looking for a runaway boy because they each believe he's their son. Veber praised Carroll's script, after the initial shock and ire of seeing his writing discarded, for finding its own identity within the requisite Americanization while also noting culturally mandated changes such as changing the plot point of the reason for the boy's mother requesting the help in finding her runaway son. In the French original, her current husband is indifferent to the boy having run away and has no desire to go look for him. Executives at 20th Century Fox were worried about portraying a father this way so it was opted to make the mother divorced in order to create a situation that would be accepted as "moral".

Billy Crystal and Robin Williams had been looking for a feature film to star in together, with their only previous joint film being Hamlet (in separate scenes). Crystal was given a copy of the 1983 French comedy Les Compères by his agent at Creative Artists Agency. Said Crystal, "I looked at it and thought this would be great for me and Robin. I called Robin and said, 'You gotta look at this thing.' Robin said, 'I love this too.' Then I went to a dinner party at [Warner Bros. production chief] Bob Daly's house and he said, 'We're excited about the prospect of you and Robin doing a movie together'. And Ivan was there and he said, 'What movie? Les Compères? I'm in'. I got everybody in. I did the producer's job. It was weird."

When asked whether they improvised during filming, Williams said, "We mostly stuck to the script, but of course we had some fun every once in a while."

== Release ==
To promote the film, Crystal and Williams appeared on an episode of Friends, a sitcom that was also produced by Warner Bros. Television.

In South Africa, Fathers' Day was released as What's Up Pop's?, a title that the distributor decided would be more appropriate for the local market. The name was subsequently changed to What's Up Pops? for DVD release when the studio realized that the apostrophe had been used incorrectly.

=== Box office ===
The film opened on May 9, 1997, finishing at #2, behind The Fifth Element, with a gross of $8,776,159. Industry observers at Warner Bros. predicted that the film would open with approximately $9 million and would gain more over the weekend. Some have speculated that one of the reasons for the film's disappointing opening was from releasing the film near Mother's Day. In its second week, the film dropped 27% to $6.4 million, totaling $17.5 million. The film ended with a domestic gross of $28,598,376 and a worldwide gross of $35,681,080. Against a budget of $85 million, the film was a box-office bomb.

Of the film's disappointing box-office run, an unnamed Warner Bros. executive said, "When [CAA] calls and says, 'We have a package, Father's [sic] Day, with Williams and Crystal, and Reitman, we say 'great'. We don't scrutinize the production. When we saw the movie, it took the wind out of us. We kept reshooting and enhancing, but you can't fix something that's bad."

== Reception ==
On the review aggregator website Rotten Tomatoes, 26% of 62 critics' reviews are positive, with an average rating of 4.2/10. The website's consensus reads: "A maudlin misfire, Fathers' Day manages the difficult task of making both Billy Crystal and Robin Williams woefully unfunny." Metacritic, which uses a weighted average, assigned the film a score of 43 out of 100, based on 27 critics, indicating "mixed or average" reviews. Audiences surveyed by CinemaScore gave the film an average grade of "B" on a scale of A+ to F.

In a one-star (out of four) review, Roger Ebert of the Chicago Sun-Times described the film as a "brainless feature-length sitcom with too much sit and no com", lamenting its predictable plot points and "its use of runaway cliches". Ebert added that the film "was recycled from the French, by the team of Lowell Ganz and Babaloo Mandel" ... and "is astonishing, given the superior quality of their collaborations like Parenthood and City Slickers".

Among the few positive reviews were Desson Thomson's of The Washington Post and Janet Maslin's of The New York Times, the latter of whom wrote, "Not surprisingly, there are some slow patches and formulaic touches, but that's a fair trade for the fun of watching Mr. Williams and Mr. Crystal make an irresistible comic team". Marjorie Baumgarten of The Austin Chronicle commented, "Fathers' Day is a mildly diverting summer family comedy. In general, that's not a bad rap, but when you've got an expectant blockbuster that stars Robin Williams and Billy Crystal and has been directed by Ivan Reitman — all of them true kings of comedy — them words 'mildly diverting' are clearly less than the desired result."

Julia Louis-Dreyfus was nominated for the Golden Raspberry Award for Worst Supporting Actress for her work in the film, but she lost to Alicia Silverstone for Batman & Robin. The film was also nominated for Most Painfully Unfunny Comedy at the 1997 Stinkers Bad Movie Awards, but barely lost to 8 Heads in a Duffel Bag.

Francis Veber, who directed Les Compères from which Fathers' Day was adapted, stated he never watched the film as "I was scared to be sad".
