= Pure Luck =

1991 film by Nadia Tass

- Theatrical release poster
- Directed by: Nadia Tass
- Written by: Herschel Weingrod; Timothy Harris
- Based on: La Chèvre by Francis Veber
- Produced by: Lance Hool; Sean Daniel
- Starring: Martin Short; Danny Glover; Sheila Kelly; Scott Wilson; Sam Wanamaker
- Cinematography: David Parker
- Edited by: Billy Weber
- Music by: Jonathan Sheffer; Danny Elfman (main titles)
- Distributed by: Universal Pictures
- Release date: August 9, 1991
- Running time: 96 minutes
- Country: United States
- Language: English
- Budget: $17 million
- Box office: $24.9 million

Pure Luck is a 1991 American comedy film directed by Australian director Nadia Tass, the only American theatrical film she would direct in her career. It is a remake of the popular French comedy film La Chèvre (1981). The film stars Martin Short, Danny Glover, Sheila Kelly, Scott Wilson, and Sam Wanamaker. The film was released in the United States by Universal Pictures on August 9, 1991.

Despite not being critically acclaimed at the time, Pure Luck was popular with American audiences, and in 2024 was voted no. 2 in IGN's "Top 10 Buddy Cop Movies of All Time".

== Plot ==
The film opens as the klutzy Valerie Highsmith arrives at an airport in Puerto Vallarta. She calls her father, a wealthy businessman, to let him know that she has arrived. While she is on the phone, she clumsily leans on the railing of her balcony and falls several stories onto a canvas. Soon after, an encounter with some street thieves knocks her unconscious and she loses her memory, then a local criminal named Frank Grimes spirits Valerie away from her hotel.

A psychologist named Monosoff, knowing that Valerie has ultra bad luck, persuades her father to send one of his employees, Eugene Proctor, an accountant with super bad luck, to find her, hoping that his bad luck could help to find the unlucky girl. Eugene is partnered with Raymond Campanella, a hardnosed investigator, who bristles at Eugene's every move.

As they travel to Mexico together, they endure one mishap after another, from damaged luggage and bad hotel rooms to bar fights with strangers. Eventually, they are told by the local police that Valerie was last seen with Frank Grimes. Eugene thinks that he can press a local prostitute for information, but she robs him. Raymond tracks the prostitute down at a gambling club (run by a man named Fernando) and confronts several men at gunpoint to retrieve Eugene's money. Neither of them realizes that Frank Grimes is seated at the table, until after they drive away and look at his picture one more time.

Raymond and Eugene return to the club and abduct Grimes to find out where Valerie is. He confesses that Valerie's extreme clumsiness required him to keep going to hospitals with her, wiping out all his money. He could no longer afford to keep her hostage. So, Grimes turned Valerie over to Fernando (Puebla). Before Grimes can take them to Valerie, he is killed in a drive-by shooting. The police arrest Raymond and Eugene by mistake. After a short stint in jail, they find out that Fernando had put Valerie on a plane to Mexico City which never arrived, and Valerie is presumed dead in a plane crash.

They charter a plane to look for Valerie's wreckage, hoping that she might have survived. During the flight, Eugene is stung by a bee and swells to an enormous size, due to an allergy. As he recovers at a field hospital, he talks to a local man who tells about a strange woman who wandered into their village one day. She was so grateful for being taken in by the villagers that she offered to make them all breakfast in the morning, but she ended up burning the village down by accident. Musing that she might be Valerie, Raymond shows the man her picture, and he screams in terror.

Raymond and Eugene head towards the burned village in search of Valerie. Eugene nearly drives them off a cliff. After barely escaping, Raymond has had enough of Eugene's dreadful luck. In a rage, he reveals to Eugene that the only reason he was hired to find Valerie was because Monosoff thought Eugene's bad luck would somehow combine with Valerie's to create some good luck. Eugene tries to fight Raymond, but he only manages to knock himself out.

Raymond takes Eugene to a local hospital. Realizing that he has befriended Eugene, he asks the nurse to take extra care with him. When Eugene wakes up, he is in a bed next to Valerie, who has also suffered a head wound. They blithely walk off hand in hand. Raymond discovers their empty beds and spots them on the end of a pier. He shouts at Eugene to let him know that he has found Valerie. Eugene stares at her in a daze and asks, "Valerie?" Hearing her name, Valerie recovers her memory. The film ends with the pair floating down the river on a piece of the pier that has broken off and is headed towards a massive waterfall.

== Cast ==
- Martin Short as Eugene Proctor
- Danny Glover as Raymond Campanella
- Sheila Kelley as Valerie Highsmith
- Sam Wanamaker as Mr. Highsmith
- Scott Wilson as Frank Grimes
- Harry Shearer as Monosoff
- Jorge Russek as Inspector Segura
- Rodrigo Puebla as Fernando
- John H. Brennan as Tyler
- Jorge Luke as Pilot
- Abel Woolrich as Prisoner
- Patricia Gage as Secretary
- Ariane Pellicer as Girl at Club
- Alexandra Vicencio as Nurse
- Sharlene Martin as Nurse

== Production ==
Pure Luck is a remake of the popular 1981 French comedy film La Chèvre.

It was directed by Australian director Nadia Tass, with cinematography by her husband David Parker. The film was produced by Lance Hool and Sean Daniel and edited by Billy Weber.

The music was composed by Jonathan Sheffer and Danny Elfman (main titles).

== Release ==
The film was released in the United States by Universal Pictures on August 9, 1991.

== Reception ==
On review aggregator website Rotten Tomatoes, the film has an approval rating of 21%, based on 14 reviews, with an average rating of 4.1/10.

Owen Gleiberman summed up Pure Luck in his D− review as, "a numbingly repetitive farce in which the cursed Short trips, walks into walls, trips, spills an entire saltshaker onto his breakfast, trips, sets people on fire, trips ..."

Roger Ebert gave the film one and a half stars, and zeroed in on the emptiness of much of the film's comedy:

Consider, for example, the scene where Proctor and Campanella are in a Jeep that is teetering on the edge of a cliff, its rear wheels hanging in mid-air. We've seen situations like this many times before, but I can't remember one less compelling. It unspools without comic timing, it stops dead in the middle, the payoff isn't funny, and later we can see it wasn't even much of a cliff.

Caryn James praised Martin Short's efforts in the film, which she found otherwise forgettable, "Against the odds, he makes Pure Luck always painless and sometimes genuinely amusing. Martin Short can do anything, it seems, except find the right movies to star in."

=== Ongoing impact ===
Around 5–7 years later, director Nadia Tass reported she was still receiving residuals from the film because of its success in America. However, she said about the film:

It was successful in a financial sense but not in a satisfying sense. It was congenial doing a Martin Short comedy, but American comedy is different from Australian comedy. It is broader. American audiences enjoyed Pure Luck, but audiences in other countries did not enjoy it so much, with the exception of the Germans. I wanted to do something else with the comedy and so did Danny Glover. I would like to have put a lot more pathos and pain into it. But they wanted a comedy for America.

The cartoon series Hey Arnold! (1996–2004) had a character, Eugene Horowitz, who is also a jinx and was likely based on Eugene Proctor from the film.

The Simpsons introduced a character named Frank Grimes in "Homer's Enemy" who suffers a similar fate at the hands of the cosmically careless Homer Simpson.

In 2024, Pure Luck was voted no. 2 in IGN's "Top 10 Buddy Cop Movies of All Time".
