= La Chèvre =

- Directed by: Francis Veber
- Written by: Francis Veber
- Produced by: Alain Poiré
- Starring: Pierre Richard; Gérard Depardieu
- Cinematography: Alex Phillips Jr.
- Edited by: Albert Jurgenson
- Music by: Vladimir Cosma
- Distributed by: Gaumont Distribution
- Release dates: 9 December 1981 (France); 1 December 1982 (Mexico)
- Running time: 95 minutes
- Country: France
- Languages: French; Spanish
- Box office: $ 56.6 million

La Chèvre (English title: Knock on Wood, literal translation: The goat) is a 1981 buddy comedy film written and directed by Francis Veber, starring Pierre Richard and Gérard Depardieu. It is the first of three films featuring Richard and Depardieu as a comic duo. It’s an international co-production film between France and Mexico.

An American remake of this film was made in 1991, starring Martin Short and Danny Glover, entitled Pure Luck.

== Plot ==
Marie Bens, the daughter of a CEO of a large company, is kidnapped while on vacation in Puerto Vallarta. The police investigation yields no results, so her father hires Campana (Gérard Depardieu), a tough, no-nonsense private detective specializing in disappearances, who spends a month in Mexico but fails to find a single lead. Desperate, Mr. Bens finally listens to a rather original idea from Meyer, the company psychologist. According to him, Campana is too "normal" to find Marie. The only way to succeed would be to send someone who shares her most notable trait: incredible bad luck. Meyer has identified the perfect candidate: François Perrin (Pierre Richard), an accountant whose life has been an endless series of mishaps. To illustrate his point, the psychologist conducts an impromptu test: he summons Perrin and asks him to sit at a large table. Faced with many empty chairs, Perrin hesitates and then chooses the one that is broken, causing him to fall. Feeling he has nothing to lose, Mr. Bens asks Perrin to take over the investigation, giving him carte blanche and the detective's help. Despite his reluctance to go along with this ridiculous plan, Campana eventually agrees to set off with Perrin, who takes his new role with utmost seriousness.

Perrin's misadventures begin from the moment they arrive at Orly Airport and continue more and more in Mexico, much to the dismay of Campana, who is both incredulous and exasperated by his sidekick. However, this accumulation of setbacks fortuitously puts them on the trail of Marie Bens' kidnapper, a man named Juan Arbal. Campana and Perrin eventually track him down, but Arbal is shot dead by his own gang to prevent him from talking. The two Frenchmen are subsequently arrested by the local police, who mistake them for the murderers, and Campana suffers a beating, beginning to fear he has been “contaminated” by Perrin's bad luck. Once they regain their freedom, they help to arrest Fernando, the gang's leader. He admits he doesn't know the fate of the captive, as the small plane transporting her to a hideout has vanished over the rainsforest, explaining the lack of a ransom demand.

Considering the Bens girl dead, Campana wants to abandon the investigation, but Meyer convinces everyone to try one last gamble: put Perrin in a plane and fly him over the jungle. Yet another twist of fate forces the plane to make an emergency landing in the middle of nowhere. Disturbed by the developments, Campana agrees to continue exploring the forest by Jeep, following Perrin’s intuitive leads. However, they soon find themselves hopelessly lost, the fuel tank running dry. Frustrated and tired of taking orders from Perrin, Campana reveals to the accountant that he is not really in charge but just a "goat", serving as bait for bad luck. The two men come to blows, but Perrin inadvertently knocks himself out and slips into a coma. Rescued by locals, they are taken to a mission for Perrin to receive care. The detective takes the opportunity to call Meyer and tell him he is definitively halting the search. Meanwhile, in the infirmary, Perrin wakes up next to another patient, also shot in the head, who turns out to be Marie Bens. Disoriented, walking hand in hand like two sleepwalkers, the unlucky pair head for a pontoon bridge on the river. The dock collapses, and they drift away, watched in astonishment by Campana.

== Cast ==
- Pierre Richard as François Perrin
- Gérard Depardieu as Campana
- Corynne Charbit as Marie Bens
- André Valardy as Meyer
- Michel Robin as Mr. Bens
- Jorge Luke as Juan Arbal
- Pedro Armendáriz Jr. as Acapulco police Captain
- Maritza Olivares as The bar prostitute
- Sergio Calderón as The fellow prisoner
- Robert Dalban as The technician at Orly Airport

== Release history and facts ==
International publication date
Country	Title	Date
France	La Chèvre	9 December 1981
Norway	Den ville jakten	9 March 1982
Germany	Der Hornochse und sein Zugpferd; Ein Tolpatsch kommt selten allein (TV title)	19 March 1982
Netherlands	Twee pechvogels in de rimboe	15 July 1982
Portugal	Que o Diabo Seja Surdo	15 July 1982
Mexico	Mas locos que una cabra	1 December 1982
Spain	La cabra	20 December 1982 (Madrid)
Italy	La capra	13 February 1983
Uruguay	Mala pata	16 June 1983
Soviet Union; Russia	Невезучие	2 December 1983; 1997 (video release)
Hungary	Balfácán	14 June 1984
United States	The Goat; Knock on Wood	26 July 1985
Denmark	Geden	26 July 1987 (French Film Week)
Canada; French	La Chèvre; Pas de chance (alternative French title)	4 March 2003 (DVD premiere)
Belgium	La Chèvre	27 June 2019 (Brussels International Film Festival)

The movie is infamous in Italy for the Cinema Statuto fire in Turin in which it was projected, killing 64 people.

== Reception ==
The film received favorable reviews, with praise for Richard and Depardieu's performances, story and humour. The film was nominated for Best Foreign Language Film of 1985 by the U.S. National Board of Review of Motion Pictures.

On review aggregator website Rotten Tomatoes, the film holds an approval rating of 50% based on 6 reviews, with an average rating of 5.5/10.
