= Francis Veber =

French director, screenwriter, producer, and playwright

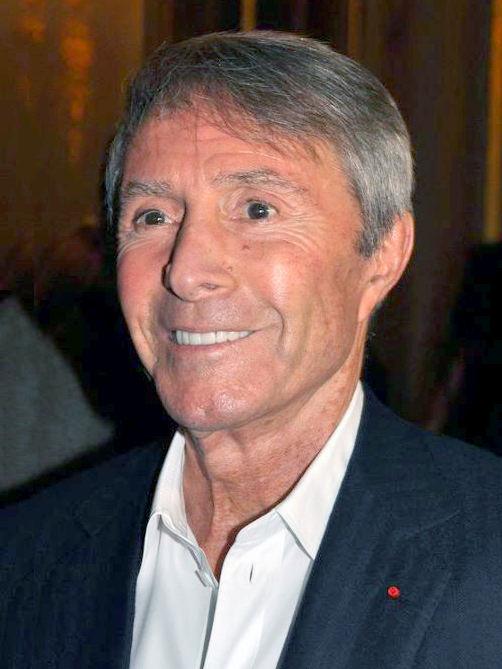
- Veber in 2012
- Born: Francis Paul Veber; 28 July 1937 (age 89); Neuilly-sur-Seine, France
- Occupations: Director; screenwriter; producer; playwright
- Spouse: Francoise Veber
- Awards: Academy Award nominee, La Cage aux folles César Award winner, Le Dîner de cons, and four-time nominee Lumière Film Award winner, Le Dîner de cons

Francis Paul Veber (born 28 July 1937) is a French film director, screenwriter, producer, and playwright. A specialist in comedies, Francis Veber has written and directed both French and American films. His directorial work includes La Chèvre (1981), Les Compères (1983), and Les Fugitifs (1986) — all major box-office successes in France that inspired Hollywood remakes, notably Three Fugitives (1989) which he directed himself. He helmed other hits like The Dinner Game (1998), for which he won the César Award for Best Original Screenplay or Adaptation, and The Closet (2001).

He also wrote scripts for French comedy classics including The Tall Blond Man with One Black Shoe (1972) and La Cage aux Folles (1978). Whether as a screenwriter or as a director, he has been associated with many commercial successes in French cinema from the 1970s to the 2000s. In later years, he focused on writing and directing plays.

== Biography ==
=== Early life ===
Veber was born in Neuilly-sur-Seine. His father was Jewish and his mother was Armenian-Russian (Veber was baptized at birth).

His parents were both authors: his father was writer and journalist Pierre-Gilles Veber, while his mother, Catherine Agadjanian, wrote romance novels under the pen name Georgette Paul. He is the great-nephew of playwright and humorist Tristan Bernard, the grandson of playwright Pierre Veber and the nephew of screenwriter, director and hit songwriter Serge Veber.

Veber’s parents, who were unhappy with their own careers as writers, encouraged him to study medicine so that he would have a stable profession. He enrolled in medical school but later shifted toward science studies with the idea of becoming a petroleum engineer. After dropping out and completing his military service, he became a journalist for the radio station RTL.

=== Career ===
It was while working at RTL that Veber debuted in the theatre, by co-writing with radio and TV host Jacques Martin an unsuccessful musical play, Petitpatapon. After being laid off from the station due to staff cutbacks, he decided to try his luck as a screenwriter, starting out by writing the television miniseries Agence intérim, broadcast by ORTF in 1969.

In 1968, Veber debuted as a playwright with L'Enlèvement, which was adapted into the 1969 film Appelez-moi Mathilde. After the latter film failed at the box office, he returned to the theatre with Le Contrat, a comedy in which a hitman finds his mission hindered by a clingy, hopeless blunderer.

In 1971, he wrote the screenplay for the successful film Il était une fois un flic, directed by Georges Lautner. His next script to be brought to the screen was The Tall Blond Man with One Black Shoe, directed by Yves Robert, which became an international hit and cemented Pierre Richard's status as France's new comedy star. In 1973, Veber adapted his own play Le Contrat for the screen: the film adaptation, L'Emmerdeur, starring Lino Ventura and Jacques Brel, was another major box office success. Veber then embarked on a prolific career as a screenwriter for Gaumont, for which he authored numerous screenplays or rewrote existing ones. Although primarily associated with comedies, he did not limit himself to that genre: in 1975, he wrote the scripts for the classic French crime films The Night (Peur sur la ville), starring Jean-Paul Belmondo, and The French Detective (Adieu poulet), starring Lino Ventura. In 1979, he wrote Jean-Jacques Annaud's classic dramedy Coup de tête. Over the years, he intervened as a script doctor on Gaumont productions as diverse as The Professional (1981) and The Big Blue (1988).

In his own projects, Veber developed a comedic device—already present in L'Emmerdeur—which involves pitting a bumbling, comical character against a "straight man" who gradually loses his composure in the face of the other's antics. Across a number of films written or directed by Veber, the comical character is most often named François Pignon or François Perrin, while the "straight man" is frequently called Campana or Lucas. The "François Pignon" name eventually proved more popular, and was reused by Veber for various unrelated "everyman" characters. Veber defines himself first and foremost as a writer who directs. The comedic mechanics of his films center on narrative and on situations, which may be rooted in dynamics such as social humiliation.

In 1976, Veber debuted as a director with The Toy (Le Jouet), starring Pierre Richard. The film was commercially successful but poorly received by critics, which prompted Veber to focus again on screenwriting. In 1978, he co-wrote the adaptation of Jean Poiret's play La Cage aux folles into an internationally successful film.

Veber returned to directing in 1981 with La Chèvre, starring Gérard Depardieu and Pierre Richard as the straight man/funny man characters. The film was a major international hit and was followed by two more films pairing Depardieu and Richard, Les Compères (1983) and Les Fugitifs (1986). All three films became enduring entertainment classics in France. Veber's comedies, like other French films of the time, also found a massive audience in the Soviet Union, taking advantage of the fact that American films were not being distributed there.

During the 1980s, Veber starting working with the American film industry, beginning with the script for the 1982 film Partners. During the second half of the 1980s, he was approached by Jeffrey Katzenberg and eventually moved to Los Angeles where he began working as a script doctor for Walt Disney Studios. In 1989, he made his first American film as a director with Three Fugitives, a remake of his own film Les Fugitifs where Nick Nolte and Martin Short stepped into Gérard Depardieu and Pierre Richard's roles, respectively.

Over the years, various French films in which Veber was involved, as either writer or director or both, were remade as English-language Hollywood films, including L'Emmerdeur (as Buddy Buddy) The Tall Blond Man with One Black Shoe (as The Man with One Red Shoe), Le Jouet (as The Toy), La Chèvre (as Pure Luck), La Cage aux folles (as The Birdcage) and Les Compères (as Fathers' Day).

Veber's second American film as a director, Out on a Limb (1992) starring Matthew Broderick, was a box-office flop; Veber, who had not written the screenplay for that film, later described his experience on the production as very negative and called its failure well-deserved. In 1995, he offered a mixed assessment of his American experience as a whole, which Le Monde described as going from a major player in the French film business to a mere cog in the Hollywood machine. Veber attributed this to differences in sensibilities and work habits between the film industries in France and the United States. He eventually returned to writing for French projects, starting with the theatre.

In 1993, Veber's play Le Dîner de Cons, starring Jacques Villeret and Claude Brasseur, was a major commercial success in France. In 1997, he directed his first French film in over a decade, the adventure comedy Le Jaguar. The film sold more than 2,4 million admissions, which was nonetheless a disappointment given its substantial budget. In 1998, he directed the film adaptation of Le Dîner de Cons, known in English as The Dinner Game, with Villeret reprising his role and Thierry Lhermitte taking over the role originated by Brasseur. The film was a massive box-office hit, sellling over 9 million admissions in France and earning several César Awards, including the César Award for Best Original Screenplay or Adaptation for Veber.

In the following years, while still residing part time in the United States, Veber regularly returned to France to direct comedy films: his next box-office successes during the 2000s were The Closet (Le Placard, 2001) with Daniel Auteuil, Gérard Depardieu and Michèle Laroque, Ruby & Quentin (Tais-toi !, 2003) with Depardieu and Jean Reno, and The Valet (La Doublure, 2006) with Gad Elmaleh and Auteuil. While all these films proved lucrative—particularly The Closet, which sold over 5 million admissions in France—the latter two marked a certain critical decline.

In 2005, Veber rewrote his play Le Contrat, which he retitled L’Emmerdeur like the film version. He then debuted as a theatre director by staging this new version himself, with Patrick Timsit and Richard Berry in the main roles. Emboldened by the show's success, Veber then directed a new film version of his play, with Timsit and Berry reprising their roles in what was essentially a remake of the 1973 film. However, it was rejected by French audiences and critics, and flopped at the box-office. Veber later commented that this film's failure - as a remake of a cult classic that featured beloved performances by Lino Ventura and Jacques Brel - had made him feel like a grave desecrator.

In 2010, Veber published his autobiography, Que ça reste entre nous (Let’s keep this between us). He then found success once again by returning to the theatre. In 2012, he wrote and directed the play Cher trésor, which starred Gérard Jugnot as the François Pignon stock character. In 2014, he adapted his own film The Closet for the stage. His subsequent plays were Un animal de compagnie (2017) and Le Tourbillon (2022).

=== Personal life ===
Veber married in 1964. He and his wife had two children, including filmmaker Jean Veber. He is the uncle of Sophie Audouin-Mamikonian, young adult author of the Tara Duncan series.

== Filmography ==
Year	Title	Director	Writer	Producer
1969	Appelez-moi Mathilde	No	Yes	No
1972	Il était une fois un flic	No	Yes	No
1972	The Tall Blond Man with One Black Shoe	No	Yes	No
1973	La Valise	No	Yes	No
1973	L'Emmerdeur	No	Yes	No
1973	Le Magnifique	No	Yes (uncredited)	No
1974	The Night Caller	No	Yes	No
1974	The Return of the Tall Blond Man with One Black Shoe	No	Yes	No
1975	The Pink Telephone	No	Yes	No
1975	The French Detective	No	Yes	No
1976	On aura tout vu	No	Yes	No
1976	The Toy	Yes	Yes	No
1978	La Cage aux Folles	No	Yes	No
1979	Cause toujours... tu m'intéresses	No	Yes	No
1979	Coup de tête	No	Yes	No
1980	La Cage aux Folles II	No	Yes	No
1980	Sunday Lovers	No	Yes	No
1981	Buddy Buddy	No	Yes (original)	No
1981	La Chèvre	Yes	Yes	No
1982	Partners	No	Yes	Executive
1982	The Toy	No	Yes (original)	No
1983	Les Compères	Yes	Yes	Uncredited
1985	The Man with One Red Shoe	No	Yes (original)	No
1985	Hold-Up	No	Yes	No
1986	Les Fugitifs	Yes	Yes	No
1989	Three Fugitives	Yes	Yes	Executive
1991	Pure Luck	No	Yes (original)	Executive
1992	Out on a Limb	Yes	No	No
1994	My Father the Hero	No	Yes	No
1995	Fantôme avec chauffeur	No	Yes	No
1996	The Birdcage	No	Yes (original)	No
1996	Le Jaguar	Yes	Yes	No
1997	Fathers' Day	No	Yes (original)	Executive
1998	The Dinner Game	Yes	Yes	No
2000	The Closet	Yes	Yes	No
2003	Ruby & Quentin	Yes	Yes	No
2006	The Valet	Yes	Yes	Associate
2008	L'Emmerdeur	Yes	Yes	No
2010	Dinner for Schmucks	No	Yes (original)	Executive
2022	The Valet	No	Yes (original)	No
2022	The New Toy	No	Yes (original)	No

== Plays ==
- 1967 : Petipatapon (with Jacques Martin), Bobino, Paris, directed by Jacques Martin
- 1968 : L'Enlèvement, Théâtre Édouard VII, Paris, directed by Jacques Fabbri
- 1969 : Le Contrat, Théâtre du Gymnase, Paris, directed by Pierre Mondy
- 1993 : Le Dîner de cons, Théâtre des Variétés, Paris, directed by Pierre Mondy
- 2005: L’Emmerdeur (revised version of Le Contrat), Théâtre de la Porte Saint-Martin, Paris, directed by himself
- 2012 : Cher trésor, Théâtre des Nouveautés, Paris, directed hy himself
- 2014 : Le Placard, Théâtre des Nouveautés, Paris, directed hy himself
- 2017 : Un animal de compagnie, Théâtre des Nouveautés, Paris, directed hy himself
- 2022 : Le Tourbillon, Théâtre de la Madeleine, Paris, directed hy himself

== Awards and honors ==
=== Accolades ===
- 1977: nomination to the César Award for Best Original Screenplay or Adaptation for The Toy
- 1979: nomination to the Academy Award for Best Adapted Screenplay for La Cage aux Folles
- 1984: nomination to the César Award for Best Original Screenplay or Adaptation for Les Compères
- 1987: nomination to the César Award for Best Original Screenplay or Adaptation for Les Fugitifs
- 1999 : Lumière Award for Best Screenplay for The Dinner Game
- 1999 : César Award for Best Original Screenplay or Adaptation for The Dinner Game
- 1999 : nominations to the César Award for Best Film and César Award for Best Director for The Dinner Game
- 2009 : Henri-Jeanson Award of SACD
- 2012 : Honorary Lumière Award for career achievement

=== Orders of merit ===
- 1996 : Chevalier (Knight) of the Légion d'honneur, promoted to Officier (Officer) in 2008.
- 2001 : Chevalier (Knight) of the Ordre national du Mérite.
