= Le Jaguar =

- Theatrical release poster
- Directed by: Francis Veber
- Written by: Francis Veber
- Produced by: Alain Poiré
- Starring: Jean Reno; Patrick Bruel
- Cinematography: Luciano Tovoli
- Edited by: Marie-Sophie Dubus
- Music by: Vladimir Cosma
- Production company: Gaumont
- Distributed by: Gaumont Buena Vista International
- Release date: 9 October 1996
- Running time: 98 minutes
- Country: France
- Language: French

Le Jaguar is a 1996 French film directed by Francis Veber starring Jean Reno, Patrick Bruel, Harrison Lowe and Patricia Velásquez. A shaman from the South American rain forest visits Paris for a public relations campaign along with a French ethnologist. When the shaman's soul is apparently stolen, he enlists the help of a good-for-nothing named Perrin, with whom he spontaneously created a spiritual link.

== Plot ==
François Perrin is a gambler, anxious to escape the thugs who pursue him after he reneged on a bet. He stumbled upon Jean Campana, a French ethnologist and environmentalist who was raised in the Amazon jungle and his companion Wanu, a shaman who has left his remote home to help Campana campaign on the rain forest's behalf in Paris. When Wanu suddenly tweaks Perrin's nose and proclaims him to be the "chosen one", Perrin is naturally surprised.

He is more surprised when Wanu shows up in his lavish apartment that same night, drugs him and covers him with ritual markings, thereby creating a magical link between them. The next day Wanu suffers a heart attack that he interprets as the theft of his soul. He beckons Perrin to him and insists that he go to the jungle with Campana to find his soul, which has taken the form of a jaguar.

Unfortunately for Perrin, the dense jungle proves to be far more dangerous than any gambler's henchmen and comical chaos ensues as he struggles to survive.

== Cast ==
- Jean Reno as Jean Campana
- Patrick Bruel as François Perrin
- Harrison Lowe as Wanù
- Patricia Velásquez as Maya
- Danny Trejo as Kumare
- Gil Birmingham as guard of Kumare
- Roland Blanche as Moulin
- François Perrot as Matelako
- Francis Lemaire as Stevens
- Jacques Curry as Olivier

== Production ==
The film was shot over a three month period on location in Brazil and Venezuela.
