= Les Fugitifs =

- Directed by: Francis Veber
- Written by: Francis Veber
- Produced by: Jean-José Richer
- Starring: Gérard Depardieu; Pierre Richard
- Cinematography: Luciano Tovoli
- Edited by: Marie-sophie Dubus
- Music by: Vladimir Cosma
- Production companies: Fideline Films; DD Productions; EFVE (as EFVE Films); Orly Films
- Distributed by: Gaumont Distribution
- Release date: 17 December 1986 (France)
- Running time: 86 minutes
- Country: France
- Language: French
- Budget: $6 million

Les Fugitifs (English: "The Fugitives") is a French 1986 action comedy film, directed by Francis Veber. It was remade in 1989 as Three Fugitives, also directed by Veber and in Philippines as Tunay na Magkaibigan, Walang Iwanan Peksman! (1994).

In the film, an experienced gangster, just released from prison, is taken hostage by an amateur during a bank robbery. The veteran robber is suspected of having orchestrated the robbery and thus forced to flee with his former captor.

== Plot ==
After serving a five-year sentence for 14 bank robberies, gangster Jean Lucas is released from prison, determined to leave crime behind. On his release day, as he goes to the bank to open an account, he finds himself in the midst of a robbery committed by bumbling amateur François Pignon. After police arrive, François takes Jean hostage and accidentally shoots him in the leg. Lucas' former nemesis, police commissioner Duroc, believes he committed the robbery. Lucas forces Pignon to go to the police and confess but upon their arrival, the officers mistake Lucas for the robber, forcing the two men to flee. Pignon takes Lucas to Dr. Martin, a senile veterinarian, to treat his wound.

Pignon is an unemployed widower whose daughter Jeanne has refused to speak since her mother died ; he initiated the bank robbery because he was desperate for money to raise his child. Unwilling to abandon his daughter, Pignon asks Lucas to help him secure a fake identity to flee the country. Lucas reluctantly contacts an old acquaintance, Labib, who extorts them by raising the passport price to 500,000 Francs. Since Pignon only stole 84,000 Francs, Labib threatens to turn him in unless Lucas pays the difference within 24 hours.

Lucas steals a van, crashes it into Labib's bar, and rescues Pignon. To clear his savior's name, Pignon signs a written confession. Lucas advises him to surrender for a light one-year sentence, but a distraught Jeanne runs away when Lucas tries to say goodbye. The men track her to a park, only to watch the police take her away. Desperate, Pignon resolves to kidnap her back and flee the country, though Lucas promises to care for Jeanne if Pignon turns himself in instead.

Lucas presents the confession to Duroc and is fully exonerated. Now working as a locksmith, he visits Jeanne at the orphanage, only to find she has stopped eating and speaking. That night, Pignon breaks in to rescue his daughter with Lucas’s assistance.

Later on, while arranging the escape of Pignon and his daughter, Lucas runs into Duroc, who warns him that the police have set up nationwide roadblocks. Realizing that a standard border crossing is impossible, Lucas hatches a plan: the trio will disguise themselves as a family using stolen passports. Lucas plays the father, Pignon dresses up as the mother, and Jeanne—sporting a fresh haircut from Lucas—poses as their son, Jean-Claude. They set off in a stolen Renault 25, pretending to be on a cross-country road trip.

The trio eventually reaches the Franco-Italian border. Lucas points them toward Italy and promises to visit one day, intending to remain in France to rebuild his own life. As Pignon and Jeanne, still disguised, walk away into the distance, Lucas watches them go. However, after seeing Pignon nearly trip over his own dress, Lucas changes his mind and runs to join them.

== Cast ==
- Pierre Richard as François Pignon
- Gérard Depardieu as Jean Lucas
- Anaïs Bret as Jeanne Pignon
- Jean Carmet as Dr. Martin, retired veterinarian
- Maurice Barrier as commissaire Duroc
- Jean Benguigui as Labib
- Roland Blanche as Labib's henchman
- Michel Blanc as Dr. Gilbert (uncredited)

== Production ==
Filming took place in Bordeaux for six weeks in June and July 1986. The film was also partially shot in front of Fort Vauban in Nîmes (Gard), at several locations in Meaux (Seine-et-Marne), and in Le Vésinet and Saint-Germain-en-Laye (Yvelines).

== Trivia ==
The movie takes place in Bordeaux in the French department of Gironde, as evidenced by the license plates on the cars in the movie ending with "33", which, between 1950 and 2009, was assigned to Gironde.
