= Bernard Aubouy =

French sound engineer and film director (1939–2024)

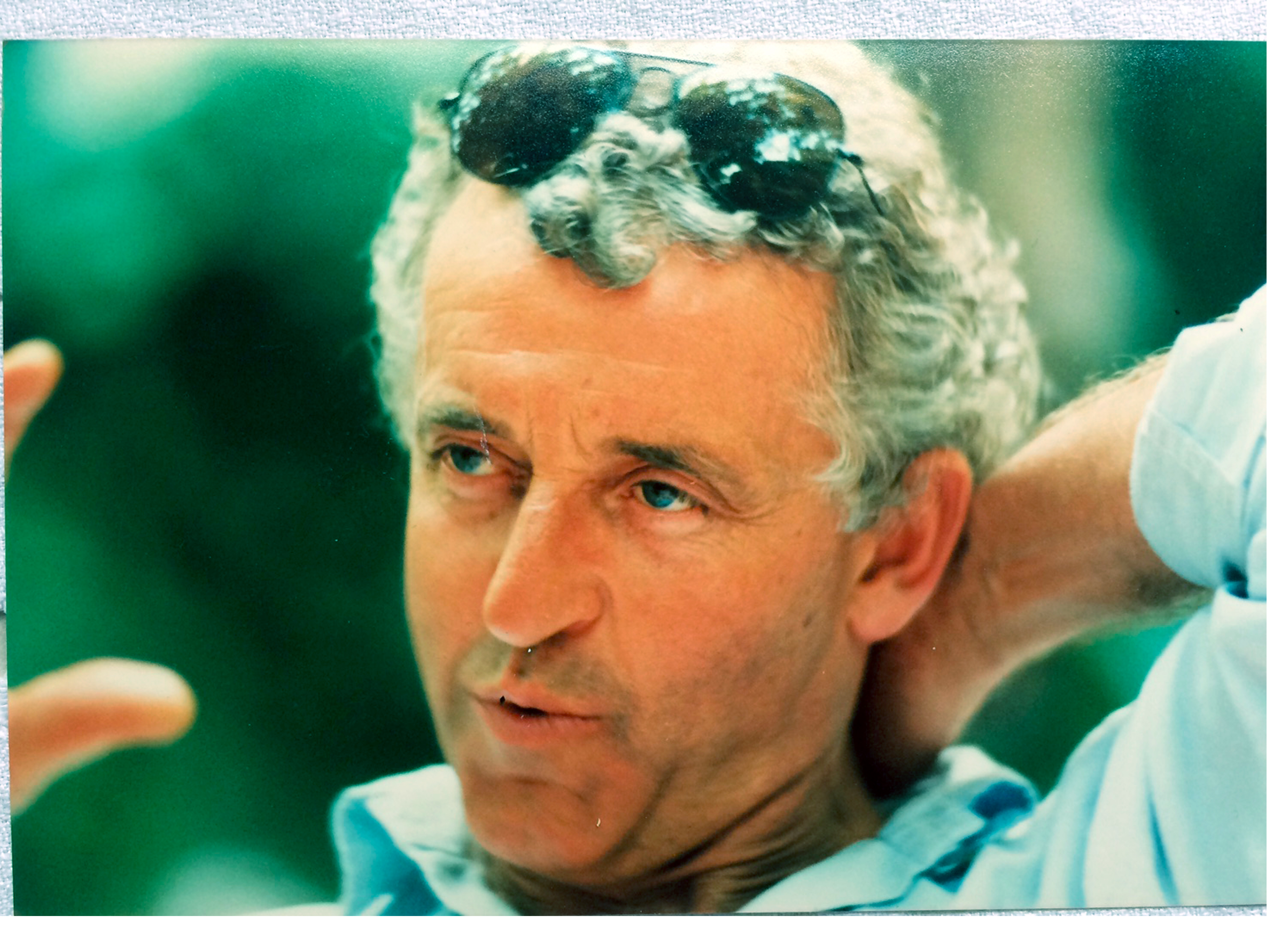
- Born: 1939; Nîmes, France
- Died: 18 February 2024 (aged 84–85); Aigues-Mortes, France
- Education: École nationale supérieure Louis-Lumière
- Occupations: Sound engineer Film director

Bernard Aubouy (1939 – 18 February 2024) was a French sound engineer and film director. He graduated from the École nationale supérieure Louis-Lumière in 1961. Aubouy died on 18 February 2024.

== Filmography ==
=== As Director ===
- Au sud du monde (1988)
- Mort d'un Rickshaw (1988)
- Chanson pour un marin (1989)
- Maman (1990)
- 13 figures de Sarah Beauchesne au 71, rue Blanche (1993)
- Une histoire russe (1994)

=== As Sound Engineer ===
- Le Père Noël a les yeux bleus (1966)
- Ballade pour un chien (1967)
- La Bande à Bonnot (1968)
- L'Amour fou (1969)
- Sept Jours ailleurs (1969)
- Pierre et Paul (1969)
- Paulina Is Leaving (1969)
- Cran d'arrêt (1970)
- Camarades (1970)
- The Mad Heart (1970)
- Les Camisards (1972)
- The Tall Blond Man with One Black Shoe (1972)
- Pourquoi Israël (1973)
- I Don't Know Much, But I'll Say Everything (1973)
- Hail the Artist (1973)
- The Secret (1974)
- No Problem! (1975)
- Lucky Pierre (1974)
- My Little Loves (1974)
- Le vieux fusil (1975)
- La Course à l'échalote (1975)
- The Toy (1976)
- On aura tout vu (1976)
- Pardon Mon Affaire (1976)
- Animal (1977)
- Peppermint Soda (1977)
- The Purple Taxi (1977)
- La Zizanie (1978)
- Cocktail Molotov (1980)
- Inspector Blunder (1980)
- Aimée (1981)
- Sweet Inquest on Violence (1982)
- Légitime violence (1982)
- Le Crime d'amour (1982)
- Les Compères (1983)
- P'tit Con (1984)
- La Tête dans le sac (1984)
- Blanche et Marie (1985)
- Le tartuffe (1984)
- Police (1985)
- Scout toujours... (1985)
- Shoah (1985)
- My Brother-in-Law Killed My Sister (1986)
- La Femme secrète (1986)
- The Grand Highway (1987)
- Flag (1987)
- Spirale (1987)
- The Revolving Doors (1988)
- Terre sacrée (1988)
- Rebus (1989)
- Corps perdus (1990)
- La Reine blanche (1991)
- Mauvaise Fille (1991)
- The Sentinel (1992)
- À cause d'elle (1993)
- Tsahal (1994)
- Les Sables mouvants (1996)
- Assassin(s) (1997)
- A Visitor from the Living (1997)
- L'Annonce faite à Marius (1998)
- Quasimodo d'El Paris (1999)
- Marry Me (2000)
- Mondialito (2000)
- Sobibor, October 14, 1943, 4 p.m. (2001)
- Slice of Life (2002)
- Benares (2006)
- The Karski Report (2010)
