= Alain Poiré =

French film producer and screenwriter (1917-2000)

- Born: 13 February 1917; Paris, France
- Died: 14 January 2000 (aged 82); Neuilly-sur-Seine, France
- Occupation: Film producer
- Relatives: Jean-Marie Poiré (son)

Alain Poiré (13 February 1917 – 14 January 2000) was a French film producer and screenwriter. He was born in Paris, and died in Neuilly-Sur-Seine.

== Life and career ==
Alain Poiré graduated from law school and worked for advertising group Havas. In 1938, he moved to working for the film company Société Nouvelle des Etablissements Gaumont (SNEG) as assistant general manager in order to save the company from financial disaster. SNEG was renamed Gaumont in 1975. Always passionate about cinema, he didn't leave Gaumont until his death in 2000, becoming one of the most prolific producers in French cinema, particularly from the 1950s on.

As producer at Gaumont and manager of Gaumont International, Alain Poiré produced more than 200 films. His final film, released after his death, was La Vache et le President.

Poiré and his wife Yvette had two sons, Phillipe and Jean-Marie Poiré. He died of cancer at age 82.

== Filmography (producer) ==
- 1948: The Spice of Life by Jean Dréville
- 1950: Tuesday's Guest by Jacques Deval
- 1950: The Girl from Maxim's by Marcel Aboulker
- 1951: Darling Caroline by Richard Pottier
- 1951: The Beautiful Image by Claude Heymann
- 1951: La Vie chantée by Noël-Noël
- 1951: The Most Beautiful Girl in the World by Christian Stengel
- 1952: The Case Against X by Richard Pottier
- 1953: A Caprice of Darling Caroline by Jean Devaivre
- 1953: Capitaine Pantoufle by Guy Lefranc
- 1954: Le Défroqué by Léo Joannon
- 1954: Les Révoltés de Lomanach by Richard Pottier
- 1954: Service Entrance by Carlo Rim
- 1955: Le Fils de Caroline chérie by Jean Devaivre
- 1955: Le Fil à la patte by Guy Lefranc
- 1955: Les Aristocrates by Denys de La Patellière
- 1955: Marguerite de la nuit by Claude Autant-Lara
- 1955: Les Carnets du Major Thompson by Preston Sturges
- 1956: Un condamné à mort s'est échappé (aka. Le vent souffle où il veut) by Robert Bresson
- 1956: Assassins et voleurs by Sacha Guitry
- 1957: Action immédiate by Maurice Labro
- 1957: Le rouge est mis by Gilles Grangier
- 1957: Les Aventures d'Arsène Lupin by Jacques Becker
- 1957: La Peau de l'ours by Claude Boissol
- 1957: Nathalie by Christian-Jaque
- 1958: Back to the Wall by Édouard Molinaro
- 1958: And Your Sister? by Maurice Delbez
- 1958: Le Miroir à deux faces by André Cayatte
- 1958: Tant d'amour perdu by Léo Joannon
- 1959: Moana by Raymond Lamy (documentary)
- 1959: Un témoin dans la ville by Édouard Molinaro
- 1959: Double Agents by Robert Hossein
- 1959: Signé Arsène Lupin by Yves Robert
- 1959: La Verte moisson by François Villiers
- 1960: Tendre et violente Elisabeth by Henri Decoin
- 1962: L'Assassin est dans l'annuaire by Léo Joannon
- 1963: Méfiez-vous, mesdames by André Hunebelle
- 1963: Jusqu'au bout du monde by François Villiers
- 1963: Carambolages by Marcel Bluwal
- 1963: Le Vice et la vertu by Roger Vadim
- 1963: Les Tontons flingueurs by Georges Lautner
- 1964: Le Gentleman de Cocody by Christian-Jaque
- 1964: Cent mille dollars au soleil by Henri Verneuil
- 1964: Fantômas by André Hunebelle
- 1964: Les Barbouzes by Georges Lautner
- 1965: When the Pheasants Pass by Édouard Molinaro
- 1965: Piège pour Cendrillon by André Cayatte
- 1965: Fantômas se déchaîne by André Hunebelle
- 1966: Trois enfants... dans le désordre by Léo Joannon
- 1966: Le Grand Restaurant by Jacques Besnard
- 1966: Ne nous fâchons pas by Georges Lautner
- 1967: Un idiot à Paris by Serge Korber
- 1967: Fantômas contre Scotland Yard by André Hunebelle
- 1967: Peau d'espion by Édouard Molinaro
- 1967: Oscar by Édouard Molinaro
- 1967: Les Risques du métier by André Cayatte
- 1967: Le fou du labo 4 by Jacques Besnard
- 1968: Leontine by Michel Audiard
- 1968: Le Pacha by Georges Lautner
- 1969: Clérambard by Yves Robert
- 1969: Le cri du cormoran le soir au-dessus des jonques by Michel Audiard
- 1969: Le Cerveau by Gérard Oury
- 1969: Hibernatus by Édouard Molinaro
- 1969: My Uncle Benjamin by Edouard Molinaro
- 1970: Elle boit pas, elle fume pas, elle drague pas, mais... elle cause! by Michel Audiard
- 1970: Le Distrait by Pierre Richard
- 1970: L'homme orchestre by Serge Korber
- 1971: Les Mariés de l'an II by Jean-Paul Rappeneau
- 1971: Boulevard du Rhum by Robert Enrico
- 1971: La Folie des grandeurs by Gérard Oury
- 1972: Il était une fois un flic by Georges Lautner
- 1972: Les Malheurs d'Alfred by Pierre Richard
- 1972: Le grand blond avec une chaussure noire by Yves Robert
- 1973: La Valise by Georges Lautner
- 1973: The Hostage Gang by Édouard Molinaro
- 1973: Escape to Nowhere by Claude Pinoteau
- 1973: Mais où est donc passée la septième compagnie? by Robert Lamoureux
- 1973: Quelques messieurs trop tranquilles by Georges Lautner
- 1974: Comment réussir quand on est con et pleurnichard by Michel Audiard
- 1974: Comme un pot de fraises by Jean Aurel
- 1974: La Gifle by Claude Pinoteau
- 1974: Le Retour du grand blond by Yves Robert
- 1975: L'Agression by Gérard Pirès
- 1975: Pas de problème ! by Georges Lautner
- 1975: The Pink Telephone by Édouard Molinaro
- 1975: On a retrouvé la septième compagnie by Robert Lamoureux
- 1976: Le Pays bleu by Jean-Charles Tacchella
- 1976: On aura tout vu by Georges Lautner
- 1976: Dracula père et fils by Édouard Molinaro
- 1976: Un éléphant ça trompe énormément by Yves Robert
- 1977: Le Maestro by Claude Vital
- 1977: Monsieur Papa by Philippe Monnier
- 1977: Gloria by Claude Autant-Lara
- 1977: Nous irons tous au paradis by Yves Robert
- 1978: L'Hôtel de la plage by Michel Lang
- 1978: Les petits câlins by Jean-Marie Poiré
- 1978: La Carapate by Gérard Oury
- 1979: Le Temps des vacances by Claude Vital
- 1979: Coup de tête by Jean-Jacques Annaud
- 1979: Flic ou voyou by Georges Lautner
- 1979: Courage - Let's Run by Yves Robert
- 1980: Retour en force by Jean-Marie Poiré
- 1980: Le Guignolo by Georges Lautner
- 1980: Le Coup du parapluie by Gérard Oury
- 1980: The Wonderful Day by Claude Vital
- 1980: La Boum by Claude Pinoteau
- 1981: Clara et les Chics Types by Jacques Monnet
- 1981: On n'est pas des anges... elles non-plus by Michel Lang
- 1981: La Chèvre by Francis Veber
- 1982: L'As des as by Gérard Oury
- 1982: La Boum 2 by Claude Pinoteau
- 1983: L'Été de nos 15 ans by Marcel Jullian
- 1984: La Septième Cible by Claude Pinoteau
- 1984: P'tit Con by Gérard Lauzier
- 1986: Jean de Florette by Claude Berri
- 1986: Je hais les acteurs by Gérard Krawczyk
- 1986: Twist again à Moscou by Jean-Marie Poiré
- 1986: Manon des sources by Claude Berri
- 1987: Lévy et Goliath by Gérard Oury
- 1987: Promis... juré ! by Jacques Monnet
- 1988: L'Étudiante by Claude Pinoteau
- 1989: La Vouivre by Georges Wilson
- 1989: L'Invité surprise by Georges Lautner
- 1990: La Gloire de mon père by Yves Robert
- 1990: Le Château de ma mère by Yves Robert
- 1992: Le Bal des casse-pieds by Yves Robert
- 1993: Cuisine et dépendances by Philippe Muyl
- 1993: La Soif de l'or by Gérard Oury
- 1994: Cache cash by Claude Pinoteau
- 1994: Pourquoi maman est dans mon lit ? by Patrick Malakian
- 1996: Fantôme avec chauffeur by Gérard Oury
- 1996: Les Victimes by Patrick Grandperret
- 1996: Le Jaguar by Francis Veber
- 1998: Le Dîner de Cons by Francis Veber
- 1999: Le Schpountz by Gérard Oury

== See also ==
- Gaumont
