= Paul Préboist =

French actor

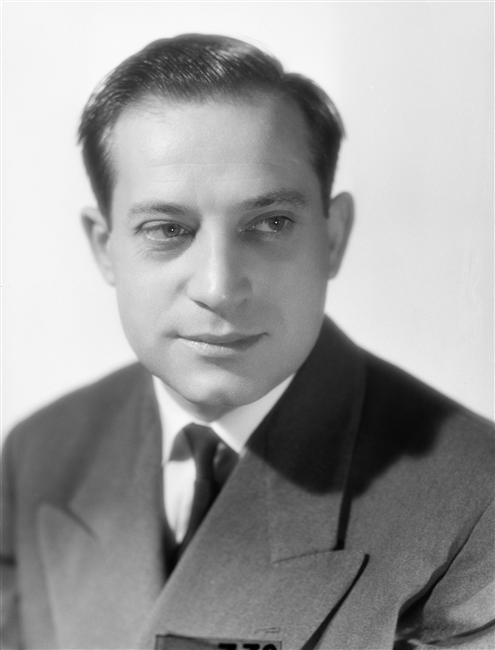
- Born: 21 February 1927; Marseille, France
- Died: 4 March 1997 (aged 70); Paris, France
- Occupation: Actor
- Years active: 1948-1992

Paul Préboist (21 February 1927 – 4 March 1997) was a French actor. He appeared in more than hundred films, mostly in supporting roles, and is best known as a comic actor.

== Filmography ==
Year	Title	Role	Director	Notes
1948	Sergil and the Dictator		Jacques Daroy	
1952	Les femmes sont des anges		Marcel Aboulker	
1954	Cadet Rousselle	A thief	André Hunebelle	
1955	Les Hussards		Alex Joffé	
1956	Diane		David Miller	
1956	Gervaise	A spectator	René Clément	
1956	Elena and Her Men	The groom	Jean Renoir	
1956	The Adventures of Gil Blas	An escort	René Jolivet & Ricardo Muñoz Suay	
1956	Les Assassins du dimanche		Alex Joffé	
1956	Ivanov	Kossith	Jean Prat	TV movie
1957	Élisa	A guard	Roger Richebé	
1957	Gates of Paris		René Clair	
1957	The Happy Road	Carpenter	Gene Kelly	
1957	The Adventures of Arsène Lupin	The groom	Jacques Becker	
1957	Azouk	The escapee	Jean Prat	TV movie
1957	Bartleby l'écrivain	Dindon	Claude Barma	TV movie
1957	Énigmes de l'histoire		Stellio Lorenzi	TV series (2 episodes)
1958	Le Sicilien	The waiter	Pierre Chevalier	
1958	The Vikings		Richard Fleischer	
1959	Les affreux		Marc Allégret	
1959	Croquemitoufle		Claude Barma	
1959	Signé Arsène Lupin	The drunkard of Enghien	Yves Robert	
1959	La marraine de Charley	The vigil	Pierre Chevalier	
1959	La nuit de Tom Brown	The salesman	Claude Barma	TV movie
1959	La clé des champs		François Chatel	TV series (1 episode)
1959	Les aventures d'Oscar	Achille	Bernard-Roland	TV series (1 episode)
1959	En votre âme et conscience		Jean Prat	TV series (1 episode)
1960	Croesus	The mason	Jean Giono	
1960	The Hole	A guardian	Jacques Becker	
1960	Le mouton	The Chief Brigadier	Pierre Chevalier	
1960	Captain Blood	A thief	André Hunebelle	
1960	Cyrano de Bergerac	The drunkard	Claude Barma	TV movie
1960	Bethléem de Provence	Le Ravi	Jean Prat	TV movie
1960	La boîte à sel		Alexandre Tarta	TV series (1 episode)
1961	Auguste	Dupont	Pierre Chevalier	
1961	Cocagne	Banane	Maurice Cloche	
1961	Captain Fracasse	A killed guard	Pierre Gaspard-Huit	
1961	Le Miracle des loups	A baladin	André Hunebelle	
1961	All the Gold in the World	The picnicker	René Clair	
1961	Les nouveaux aristocrates	The printer	Francis Rigaud	
1961	Hauteclaire	The stable boy	Jean Prat	TV movie
1961	Monsieur Antoine	The machinist	Guy Lessertisseur	TV movie
1961	Le médecin volant	Fat René	Ange Casta	TV movie
1961	Elan blanc	The little boy	Pierre Cardinal	TV mini-series
1961	Le trésor des 13 maisons		Jean Bacqué	TV series (1 episode)
1962	Cartouche	A cop	Philippe de Broca	
1962	Tartarin of Tarascon	Costecade	Francis Blanche	
1962	We Will Go to Deauville	The priest	Francis Rigaud	
1962	The Seven Deadly Sins	Alphonse	Philippe de Broca	
1962	Font-aux-Cabres	Mengo	Jean Kerchbron	TV movie
1963	Bébert et l'omnibus		Yves Robert	
1964	The Gorillas	The agent of Orly	Jean Girault	
1964	La mort d'un tueur	The hairdresser	Robert Hossein	
1964	Weekend at Dunkirk	A soldier	Henri Verneuil	
1964-1977	Les Cinq Dernières Minutes	Various Characters	Claude Loursais & Guy Lessertisseur	TV series (8 episodes)
1965	The Majordomo	The butler of Ventoux	Jean Delannoy	
1965	Up to His Ears	Cornac	Philippe de Broca	
1965	The Art of Love	Bus Driver	Norman Jewison	
1965	Cent briques et des tuiles	The Cousin	Pierre Grimblat	
1965	When the Pheasants Pass	The junk dealer	Édouard Molinaro	
1965	Le monde est petit		Jean Prat	TV movie
1965	Les fourberies de Scapin		Jean Kerchbron	TV movie
1965	Mon royaume pour un lapin	Fulcran	Jacques Villa	TV movie
1965	Frédéric le gardian	Jules	Jacques Villa	TV series (1 episode)
1965	Le train bleu s'arrête 13 fois	Frédo	Michel Drach	TV series (1 episode)
1966	Naked Hearts		Édouard Luntz	
1966	The Big Restaurant	The cellarman	Jacques Besnard	
1966	La Grande Vadrouille	The fisherman	Gérard Oury	
1966	Sale temps pour les mouches	Inspector Pinaud	Guy Lefranc	
1966	Monsieur le Président Directeur Général	A warrant officer	Jean Girault	
1966	Le petit cheval de bois		Richard Balducci	Short
1967	Oscar	Charles	Édouard Molinaro	
1967	Fleur d'oseille	The Painter	Georges Lautner	
1967	The Two of Us	Maxime	Claude Berri	
1967	An Idiot in Paris	Square Guardian	Serge Korber	
1967	Le fou du labo IV	The Agent	Jacques Besnard	
1967	L'homme qui trahit la mafia	Garage Attendant	Charles Gérard	
1967	Les créatures du bon Dieu		Jean Laviron	TV series (1 episode)
1968	Béru et ces dames	Inspector Pinaud	Guy Lefranc	
1968	La tempête	Caliban	François Gir	TV movie
1968	La dame fantôme	Cosme	François Gir	TV movie
1968	Les dossiers de l'agence O	The old driver	Marc Simenon	TV series (1 episode)
1969	Hibernatus	Charles	Édouard Molinaro	
1969	My Uncle Benjamin	Parlenta	Édouard Molinaro	
1969	La honte de la famille	Inspector Picherande	Richard Balducci	
1970	La maison	Pascal	Gérard Brach	
1970	Le Distrait	Monsieur Klerdene	Pierre Richard	
1970	Et qu'ça saute !	Guadara	Guy Lefranc	
1970	L'homme orchestre	Hotel Manager	Serge Korber	
1970	Le gendarme en balade	The groom	Jean Girault	
1970	Les lettres de mon moulin	Gaucher	Pierre Badel	TV movie
1971	Jo	The adjutant	Jean Girault	
1971	Caméléons	Léon Prades	René Couderc	
1971	L'explosion	Inspector	Marc Simenon	
1971	Easy, Down There!	The old choir boy	Jacques Deray	
1971	Perched on a Tree	The radio reporter	Serge Korber	
1971	Delusions of Grandeur	The mute	Gérard Oury	
1971	The Boat on the Grass	Leon	Gérard Brach	
1971	Laisse aller... c'est une valse	Rollas	Georges Lautner	
1972	Le Viager	The cheese maker	Pierre Tchernia	
1972	Stadium Nuts	Jules	Claude Zidi	
1972	Five Leaf Clover	Léon Constant	Edmond Freess	
1972	Les joyeux lurons	Priest Paccard	Michel Gérard	
1972	Les malheurs d'Alfred	The peasant	Pierre Richard	
1972	Tout le monde il est beau, tout le monde il est gentil	Old priest	Jean Yanne	
1973	La belle affaire	Brother Nahum #1	Jacques Besnard	
1973	La raison du plus fou	The truck driver	François Reichenbach	
1973	Oh, If Only My Monk Would Want (Ah! Si mon moine voulait...)	Sandras	Claude Pierson	
1973	Moi y'en a vouloir des sous	Vergeot	Jean Yanne	
1973	La dernière bourrée à Paris	Émile	Raoul André	
1973	Quelques messieurs trop tranquilles	Adrien	Georges Lautner	
1974	O.K. patron	Léon's Boss	Claude Vital	
1974	Les vacanciers	Benjamin Chatton	Michel Gérard	
1974	Chinese in Paris	Civil servant	Jean Yanne	
1974	Le Plumard en folie	Paul	Jacques Lemoine & Georges Combret	
1974	Le permis de conduire	The station manager	Jean Girault	
1974	The Four Charlots Musketeers	Father Joseph	André Hunebelle	
1974	The Four Charlots Musketeers 2	Father Joseph	André Hunebelle	
1974	Y'a un os dans la moulinette	Montescourt	Raoul André	
1974	One-Eyed Men Are Kings	Léon	Michel Leroy & Edmond Séchan	Short
1975	La table		Eric Brach	Short
1976	La grande récré	Paulo	Claude Pierson	
1976	Le sanglier de Cassis	The Priest	Carlo Rim	TV movie
1976	Au théâtre ce soir	Sauveur	Pierre Sabbagh	TV series (1 episode)
1978	L'avare	Master Jacques	Jean Pignol	TV movie
1979	An Adventure for Two	Mimile	Claude Lelouch	
1980	Les phallocrates	Coeurjoli	Claude Pierson	
1980	The Wonderful Day	The doctor	Claude Vital	
1980	Kick, Raoul, la moto, les jeunes et les autres	Jules	Marc Simenon	TV series (1 episode)
1981	Signé Furax	White	Marc Simenon	
1981	Les Babas Cool	Monsieur Triconet	François Leterrier	
1981	Les Uns et les Autres	Edith's grandfather	Claude Lelouch	
1981	Les bidasses aux grandes manoeuvres	Colonel Beaudoin	Raphaël Delpard	
1982	Les Misérables	Fauchelevent	Robert Hossein	
1982	Mon Curé Chez les Nudistes	Priest Daniel	Robert Thomas	
1982	Deux heures moins le quart avant Jésus-Christ	The Lion Keeper	Jean Yanne	
1983	Un bon petit diable	Brother Nick	Jean-Claude Brialy	
1983	Le Braconnier de Dieu	The Priest	Jean-Pierre Darras	
1983	Les planqués du régiment	The Colonel	Michel Caputo	
1983	L'émir préfère les blondes	Joseph	Alain Payet	
1983	Y a-t-il un pirate sur l'antenne?	Inspector Harry Kossek	Jean-Claude Roy	
1983	Tante Blandine	Jojo	Guy Jorré	TV movie
1983	Les Uns et les Autres	Edith's grandfather	Claude Lelouch	TV mini-series
1984	Les fausses confidences	Arlequin	Daniel Moosmann	
1985	Le facteur de Saint-Tropez	Robin Bellefeuille	Richard Balducci	
1985	Liberté, égalité, choucroute	Gaston	Jean Yanne	
1987	La calanque	Ange	Jean Canolle	TV series (1 episode)
1988	Loft Story		Stéphane Bertin & Boramy Tioulong	TV series (1 episode)
1988	Sueurs froides	Plomion	Arnaud Sélignac	TV series (1 episode)
1989	La folle journée ou Le mariage de Figaro	Antonio	Roger Coggio	
1990	There Were Days... and Moons	The retired man	Claude Lelouch	
1992	La Belle Histoire	The knit teacher	Claude Lelouch	

== Theater ==
Year	Title	Author	Director
1953	Le Dindon	Georges Feydeau	Jean Meyer
1956	Nemo	Alexandre Rivemale	Jean-Pierre Grenier
1957-1958	Auguste	Raymond Castans	Jean Wall
1958	Rididine	Alexandre Breffort	Maurice Vaneau
1960	Boubouroche	Georges Courteline	Georges Chamarat
1960	Théodore cherche des allumettes	Georges Courteline	Georges Chamarat
1961	Le Petit Bouchon	Michel André	Jacques Mauclair
1962-1963	Pas d'usufruit pour tante Caroline	Frédéric Valmain	Jean Dejoux
1967	Extra-Muros	Raymond Devos	Raymond Devos
