= Jean André (art director) =

- Born: 18 June 1916; Paris, France
- Died: 22 February 1980 (aged 63); Paris, France
- Occupation: Art director
- Years active: 1945-1980 (film)

Jean André (1916–1980) was a French art director, active as a production designer in French cinema. es: Jean André (director de arte)

== Selected filmography ==
- Rhine Virgin (1953)
- Elena and Her Men (1956)
- And God Created Woman (1956)
- Toi... le venin (1958)
- The Ravishing Idiot (1964)
- La Grande Vadrouille (1966)
- The Game Is Over (1966)
- Darling Caroline (1968)
- Don Juan, or If Don Juan Were a Woman (1973)
- Someone Is Bleeding (1974)
- On aura tout vu (1976)
- Violette & François (1977)
- La Carapate (1978)
- The Umbrella Coup (1980)

== Bibliography ==
- Slide, Anthony. Fifty Classic French Films, 1912-1982: A Pictorial Record. Dover Publications, 1987.
