= An Idiot in Paris =

- Directed by: Serge Korber
- Written by: René Fallet (novel); Michel Audiard; Serge Korber; Jean Vermorel
- Produced by: Alain Poiré
- Starring: Dany Carrel; Jean Lefebvre; Bernard Blier
- Cinematography: Jean Rabier
- Edited by: Marie-Claire Korber; Germaine Artus
- Music by: Bernard Gérard
- Production company: Gaumont International
- Distributed by: Gaumont Distribution
- Release date: 22 March 1967
- Running time: 90 minutes
- Country: France
- Language: French

An Idiot in Paris (French: Un idiot à Paris) is a 1967 French comedy film directed by Serge Korber and starring Dany Carrel, Jean Lefebvre and Bernard Blier.

== Cast ==
- Dany Carrel as Juliette dite 'La fleur'
- Jean Lefebvre as Goubi
- Bernard Blier as Léon Dessertine
- Robert Dalban as Patouilloux
- Micheline Luccioni as Lucienne - une prostituée
- Fernand Berset as Jules Grafouillères
- Jean Carmet as Ernest Grafouillères
- Albert Rémy as Rabichon, le restaurateur
- Bernadette Lafont as Berthe Patouilloux
- André Pousse as Le chauffeur de taxi
- Paul Préboist as Le gardien du square / Square Guardian
- Philippe Avron as François Flutiaux
- Yves Robert as Marcel Pitou, l'évadé des HLM / Man by the Seine
- Lucien Raimbourg as Catolle
- Jeanne Pérez as Germaine Catolle
- Hubert de Lapparent as Police inspector Pingeon
- Robert Castel as Un agent de police
- Jean-Claude Massoulier as Un inspecteur
- Pierre Richard as L'agent de police Boudinos

== Bibliography ==
- Philippe Rège. Encyclopedia of French Film Directors, Volume 1. Scarecrow Press, 2009.
