= The Wild Goose Chase (1975 film) =

- French theatrical release poster
- French: La Course à l'échalote
- Directed by: Claude Zidi
- Screenplay by: Claude Zidi; Michel Fabre; Jean-Luc Voulfow
- Produced by: Christian Fechner; Claude Berri
- Starring: Pierre Richard; Jane Birkin; Michel Aumont
- Cinematography: Henri Decaë
- Edited by: Robert Isnardon; Monique Isnardon
- Music by: Vladimir Cosma
- Production companies: Les Films Christian Fechner; Renn Productions
- Distributed by: AMLF
- Release date: 8 October 1975
- Running time: 110 minutes
- Country: France
- Language: French

The Wild Goose Chase (French: La Course à l'échalote, lit. 'The Race for the shallot', a phrase roughly translating as "The Rat race") is a 1975 French comedy film directed by Claude Zidi, and starring Pierre Richard and Jane Birkin. The story follows a fumbling bank executive (Richard) and his girlfriend (Birkin) as they chase thieves following a break-in at his workplace.

The film reunites Richard, Birkin and director Zidi following the success of Lucky Pierre (La moutarde me monte au nez !). Like their previous collaboration, The Wild Goose Chase was a box-office hit in France.

== Plot ==
Pierre Vidal, a clumsy and anxious executive at the "20th Century Bank" in Paris, is perpetually insecure about his relationship with his girlfriend Janet. He regularly spies on her with binoculars while she works at her hairdressing salon across the street from the bank. Finding Pierre too proper, and annoyed at being spied on, Janet flirts with her clients just to spite him.

With his manager away on a week's vacation, Pierre serves as the interim replacement. Overwhelmed by the responsibility, he commits a series of blunders; his behavior raises the suspicion of police commissioner Brunet, as the bank was robbed one year before. During his stint, Pierre receives a wealthy client, Bertrand de Rovère, who deposits a deed transferring company shares. De Rovère has purchased the shares via a third party and left the documents blank, as he did not wish to appear as the official owner of the lucrative, yet embarrassing business.

On the final day of Pierre's interim role, he is knocked out by a man disguised as a woman, who then steals from the safe deposit box the briefcase containing de Rovère's documents. Anxious to protect the bank's reputation, Pierre decides to investigate himself without notifying the police. In the confusion, the thief left behind a raincoat containing an invitation for a festive trip from Paris to Brighton, England, along with the troupe of a famous Parisian music hall. Pierre cancels his weekend plans with Janet to pursue the thief. Suspecting he might be cheating, Janet follows him, while Brunet tails them both.

Pierre, Janet and Brunet board the train to Cherbourg separately, along with the troupe which turns out to be composed of generally flamboyant gay men, including drag performers; it is also revealed that those responsible for the theft are three troupe members—Gunther, Mike, and their klutzy accomplice, Frantz—who aim to take control of the music hall venue by appropriating de Rovère's shares. Brunet tries to extract information from Janet, who eludes him. Pierre briefly manages to get hold of the briefcase but, while fleeing Gunther and Mike, drops it into a piece of scenery from the troupe's show. Later, as they cross the English Channel, Pierre escapes his pursuers by jumping into a boat; Janet, escaping from Brunet, ends up in the same boat.

Pierre and Janet head to the Brighton theater where the troupe is due to perform its show, while Brunet arrives there separately. Following a series of chases and mishaps, Pierre and Janet escape a deadly trap set by the thieves, while Brunet finds himself trapped within a piece of scenery. As the troupe's performance is underway, Pierre's antics backstage cause him to destroy the scenery, disrupting the show and ultimately creating chaos onstage. The English audience, which had initially not enjoyed the show's campy atmosphere, becomes delighted, believing it is all part of the act—even when Mike tries to murder Pierre onstage by throwing knives at him. Pierre eventually manages to defeat the gang of thieves and retrieve the briefcase; meanwhile, his manager, who had arrived at the theater, falls into the same piece of scenery as Brunet, who arrests him.

Upon returning to Paris, Pierre meets with his CEO, who informs him that the investigation revealed it was the manager who had provided the keys to the deposit box to the thieves, in order to benefit his boyfriend, Gunther. While Pierre expected to be congratulated, he ends up being fired by his CEO, who has been displeased with the bad publicity. Pierre then flips the script by filling out de Rovère's blank documents in his own name, instantly turning himself into a wealthy and respected client of the bank. De Rovère arrives and takes Pierre into his car, desperately trying to convince him to become his business partner; smelling trouble, Janet decides to follow them.

== Cast ==
- Pierre Richard as Pierre Vidal
- Jane Birkin as Janet
- Michel Aumont as Commissioner Brunet
- Marc Dolnitz as Marc
- Amadeus August as Gunther
- Henri Déus as Mike
- Luis Rego as Frantz
- Catherine Allégret as Nicole
- André Bézu as André
- Jean Martin as bank manager
- Claude Dauphin as Bertrand de Rovère
- Philippe Dehesdin as Philippe
- Paul Cambo as bank CEO
- Jean Bouchaud as Brunet's deputy
- Manu Pluton as troupe performer
- Gérard Majax as himself

== Production ==
The Wild Goose Chase was produced on the heels of the box-office success of Lucky Pierre, which already starred Pierre Richard and Jane Birkin; producer Christian Fechner sought to replicate the latter film's winning formula by reuniting its two leads with director Claude Zidi.

Filming took place in Paris, in Manche, Normandy—including Cherbourg-Octeville, La Hague, and the Val de Saire area, as well as in Brighton, England. The scene where the protagonists escape from the deadly trap involved an elaborate and spectacular stunt including fire. Pierre Richard and Jane Birkin personally filmed key parts of the sequence; Richard later described the experience as particularly difficult and frightening for them both.

== Reception ==
The film was a major box-office success in France, selling over 2.9 million admissions. Its box office returns, however, were lower than those of Lucky Pierre, which had sold 3.7. Also like its predecessor, the film performed well in Germany, where it sold 774,428 admissions.

In a 2024 review, Cécile Mury of Télérama praised the chemistry and energetic performances of Richard and Birkin but commented that, while the film included some very funny scenes, it ultimately ran out of steam. A 2025 Blu-Ray review called the film a delightful and inventive comedy, with particular praise for Richard's cartoonish performance.

== Home video ==
The film was reissued on DVD and Blu-Ray, and on VOD on various streaming services.
