= Jo (film) =

- Directed by: Jean Girault
- Written by: Claude Magnier; Jacques Vilfrid; Jean Girault
- Based on: the play The Gazebo by Alec Coppel
- Produced by: Léo L. Fuchs
- Starring: Louis de Funès; Claude Gensac; Michel Galabru; Bernard Blier
- Cinematography: Henri Decaë
- Edited by: Armand Psenny
- Music by: Raymond Lefèvre
- Distributed by: Metro-Goldwyn-Mayer
- Release date: 1 September 1971 (France)
- Running time: 85 mins
- Country: France
- Language: French
- Box office: $18.5 million

Jo is a French comedy film, originally released in 1971. It is known in English-language territories either as Joe: The Busy Body or The Gazebo. It was directed by Jean Girault and stars Louis de Funès as playwright Antoine Brisebard, Claude Gensac as an actress and his wife Sylvie Brisebard, and Bernard Blier as inspector Ducros.

The script is based on a play by Alec Coppel, published in 1958, The Gazebo. Jo is its second adaptation, the first one being the 1959 film The Gazebo, starring Glenn Ford and Debbie Reynolds.

In the film, a comic playwright is being blackmailed by someone who knows about his wife's familial relationship to a notorious criminal. The playwright decides to kill the blackmailer and to hide his remains in the foundations of his new pavilion. The supposed blackmailer is killed accidentally, and the body is hidden as planned. But the writer soon finds out that his blackmailer was murdered elsewhere, and that the man which he met was an imposter. His hiding place turns out to be inadequate due to faulty construction, and he must find a way to transport the corpse.

== Synopsis ==
Antoine Brisebard, a famous comedy playwright, is struggling with financial difficulties and is preparing to sell his country villa to an English couple. What no one knows, however, is that Brisebard is actually a victim of blackmail since his wife Sylvie, a famous actress, is the daughter of a notorious robber-murderer. His extortionist is a malevolent criminal only known as Jo, who visits him often to pick up his hush money. Faced with certain ruin, Brisebard is preparing to do away with Jo once and for all, planning his deed under the guise of trying to write the script for a crime play and consulting his friend, attorney Colas, for ideas of how to efficiently get rid of the body. He also takes up the offer of garden landscaper Tonelotti to erect a pavilion, whose foundation would provide the ideal hiding place for the corpse. On the night Jo is scheduled to arrive for his next payment, Brisebard awaits him with a gun, but is not able to pull the trigger and drops the gun to the floor, which results in a shot going off and accidentally killing Jo.

But it is only then that things become truly difficult. Police inspector Ducros, who has found out about Jo's operation and Brisebard's involvement in it, starts nosing around, telling Brisebard that Jo had already been murdered at the time he was supposed to come to the villa - the man Brisebard shot is eventually revealed as Riri, Jo's criminal associate and murderer. The pavillon foundation proves to be shoddy, forcing Brisebard to hide the body elsewhere; a lot of unwanted houseguests - including Ducros and two of Riri's rivals - keep coming and going; and Riri's body stubbornly refuses to remain hidden. Even with the help of his wife, to whom he confesses everything, the task of getting rid of the body becomes an outright daunting – and nerve-wracking – one.

In the end, though most issues eventually resolve themselves, Brisebard and Sylvie are still faced with the problem of how to dispose of the corpse. Brisebard finally puts it inside a car and pushes the vehicle off a cliffside; however, this bluff is coincidentally located near a site where Ducros is camping with his family. As soon as he finds Riri's body in the wreckage and Brisebard looking down from the top of the cliff, Ducros ends the film chasing Brisebard all over the landscape.

== Cast ==
- Louis de Funès: Antoine Brisebard
- Claude Gensac: Sylvie Brisebard
- Michel Galabru: Tonelotti
- Bernard Blier: Inspector Ducros
- Guy Tréjan: Maître Colas
- Ferdy Mayne: Mr. Grunder
- Yvonne Clech: Mrs. Grunder
- Florence Blot: Madame Cramusel
- Micheline Luccioni: Françoise
- Christiane Muller: Mathilde
- Jacques Marin: Andrieux
- Carlo Nell: Plumerel
- Jean Droze: Riri
- Paul Préboist: The adjutant

== Production ==
The film was made by the European arm of MGM, the studio which had filmed The Gazebo in 1959.

== Reception ==
Following its release, the film sold 2,466,966 tickets in France. It was the 13th most successful film in France in 1971, far behind The Aristocats, at the top of the box office with 12,481,726 tickets sold in the country. Jo was a small success for Louis de Funès, whose films usually attracted large popular interest. Most of the critics praised the performance of Louis de Funès but deplored the weak direction of Jean Girault, who admitted that de Funès was responsible for 60% of the gags used in the film.
