= Les malheurs d'Alfred =

- Directed by: Pierre Richard
- Written by: Pierre Richard; Yves Robert
- Produced by: Alain Poiré; Yves Robert
- Starring: Pierre Richard; Anny Duperey
- Cinematography: Jean Boffety
- Edited by: Ghislaine Desjonquères
- Music by: Vladimir Cosma
- Distributed by: Gaumont Distribution
- Release date: 1 March 1972
- Running time: 98 minutes
- Country: France
- Language: French
- Box office: $8,479,763

Les malheurs d'Alfred (The Troubles of Alfred) is a 1972 French comedy film directed by and starring Pierre Richard.

== Plot ==
Alfred Dhumonttyé is an unemployed architect who is incredibly unlucky. While wanting to commit suicide, he meets a female television presenter who is pursued by the same misfortune.

== Cast ==
- Pierre Richard as Alfred Dhumonttyé
- Anny Duperey as Agathe Bodard
- Jean Carmet as Paul
- Paul Préboist as the peasant
- Paul Le Person as the policeman
- Mario David as Kid Barrantin, the boxer
- Francis Lax as Boggy, the member of the Paris team
- Yves Robert as the Parisian TV viewer
- Robert Dalban as Gustave, the chauffeur of Morel
- Marco Perrin as Orlandi, the manager of Kid
- Pierre Mondy as François Morel, the famous game show host
- Évelyne Buyle as Lucrèce

== Release history ==
Country	Release date
France	1 March 1972
Hungary	10 October 1974
Sweden	11 October 1974
West Germany	8 August 1975

The film has been released on DVD in Poland as Nieszczęścia Alfreda, in Germany as Alfred, die Knallerbse, and in France with Le distrait in the box Pierre Richard, réalisateur, apparently without subtitles even in French.
