= Comment réussir quand on est con et pleurnichard =

- Directed by: Michel Audiard
- Written by: Michel Audiard; Jean-Marie Poiré
- Produced by: Pierre Braunberger; Alain Poiré
- Starring: Jean Carmet; Jean-Pierre Marielle; Stéphane Audran; Jane Birkin; Evelyne Buyle; Jean Rochefort; Daniel Prévost; Jeanne Herviale; Ginette Garcin; Jean-Claude Dreyfus
- Cinematography: Maurice Fellous
- Edited by: Monique Isnardon; Robert Isnardon
- Music by: Eddie Vartan
- Distributed by: Gaumont Distribution
- Release date: 19 June 1974 (France)
- Running time: 90 minutes
- Country: France
- Language: French
- Box office: $5.9 million

Comment réussir quand on est con et pleurnichard (Note: Stylized on-screen as Comment réussir... quand on est con et pleurnichard.) ('How to Succeed When You're a Jerk and a Crybaby') is a French comedy film directed by Michel Audiard, released in 1974. It is notable as the first film with the actor Jean-Claude Dreyfus. Audiard appears in the film as a nurse.

== Plot ==
In Paris, Antoine lives modestly with his sour old mother and sells cases of fake vermouth to owners of little bars, his ploy being to win their sympathy, particularly the wives. Telling tales of his sad life, he recites fake Baudelaire poetry and ends with the burial of his beloved mother. He wins the sympathy of Marie-Josée, a hotel employee who is the mistress of Gérard, the manager. He wins the sympathy of Jane, a stripper who lives with Foisnard, a pianist. After sending Jane and Gérard off touring in a double act, he wins the sympathy of Gérard's wife Cécile and moves into her country house, spending his days as manager of Gérard's hotel, where he enjoys the favours of Marie-Josée. As everybody comes to realise how he has manipulated them, the game ends and he is back with his mother, planning a campaign to unload more vermouth.

== Technical data ==
- Director : Michel Audiard
- Screenplay : Michel Audiard and Jean-Marie Poiré
- Duration : 90 minutes
- Release date : 19 June 1974
- Language: French

== Cast ==
- Jean Carmet : Antoine Robineau
- Jean-Pierre Marielle : Gérard Malempin
- Stéphane Audran : Cécile Malempin
- Jane Birkin : Jane
- Evelyne Buyle : Marie-Josée Mulot
- Jean Rochefort : Foisnard
- Daniel Prévost : Carducci
- Jeanne Herviale : Robineau's mother
- Robert Dalban : Léonce
- Jacqueline Doyen : Madame Léonce
- Jean-Claude Dreyfus : The transformist
- Ginette Garcin : The head nurse
- Minka : The surly nurse
- Michel Audiard : The male nurse
- Laurence Badie : The hotel attendant
- Paul Bisciglia : The hunter
- Féodor Atkine : The mime
- Manu Pluton : The black
- Sébastien Floche : Marcel
