= When the Pheasants Pass =

1965 film

- Directed by: Édouard Molinaro
- Written by: Jacques Emmanuel; Albert Simonin; Michel Audiard
- Produced by: Alain Poiré; Jean Le Duc
- Starring: Paul Meurisse; Bernard Blier; Jean Lefebvre
- Cinematography: Raymond Le Moigne]
- Edited by: Monique Isnardon; Robert Isnardon
- Music by: Michel Legrand
- Production company: Gaumont
- Distributed by: Gaumont Distribution
- Release date: 10 September 1965
- Running time: 89 minutes
- Country: France
- Language: French

When the Pheasants Pass (French: Quand passent les faisans) is a 1965 French comedy crime film directed by Édouard Molinaro and starring Paul Meurisse, Bernard Blier and Jean Lefebvre. The film's sets were designed by the art director Jacques Paris.

== Cast ==
- Paul Meurisse as Alexandre Larsan-Bellac
- Bernard Blier as Hyacinthe Camus
- Jean Lefebvre as Arsène Baudu
- Michel Serrault as Ribero
- Yvonne Clech as Valerie Patterson
- Claire Maurier as Micheline Camus
- Daniel Ceccaldi as Barnave
- Robert Dalban as Le portier de l'hôtel
- Roger Dutoit as Arthur Thibaut
- Jacques Dynam as Le chauffeur de Ribero
- Véronique Vendell as Jeanne
- Paul Demange as Le marchand de vieux papiers
- Frank Villard as Chinaud
- Paul Préboist as Le brocanteur

== Bibliography ==
- Salachas, Gilbert & Bottet, Béatrice· Michel Serrault. Edilig, 1986.
- Rège, Philippe. Encyclopedia of French Film Directors, Volume 1. Scarecrow Press, 2009.
