= Lucky Pierre (film) =

1974 film by Claude Zidi

- Theatrical release poster
- French: La moutarde me monte au nez !
- Directed by: Claude Zidi
- Written by: Claude Zidi; Pierre Richard; Michel Fabre
- Produced by: Christian Fechner; Claude Berri
- Starring: Pierre Richard; Jane Birkin
- Cinematography: Henri Decaë
- Edited by: Robert Isnardon; Monique Isnardon
- Music by: Vladimir Cosma
- Production companies: Les Films Christian Fechner; Renn-Productions; Films 7; Simar
- Distributed by: AMLF
- Release date: 9 October 1974 (France)
- Running time: 92 minutes
- Country: France
- Language: French

Lucky Pierre (French: La moutarde me monte au nez !, lit. 'The Mustard Is Rising into My Nose !', a phrase meaning "I'm Losing My Temper") is a 1974 French comedy film directed by Claude Zidi, starring Pierre Richard and Jane Birkin. The script was written by Zidi, with contributions from Richard and Michel Fabre. It tells the story of a klutzy teacher (Richard) who becomes embroiled in a media circus after he is mistakenly believed to have an affair with a Hollywood star (Birkin).

The film's humor relies both on farcical situations and on the slapstick typical of Richard's films. It was part of a series of box office successes that established Richard as one of France's comedy stars during the first half of the 1970s.

== Plot ==
Pierre Durois, a shy and clumsy mathematics teacher, works at a girls' high school in the South of France; he is the son of Dr. Hubert Durois, an affluent surgeon who is also the city's conservative mayor. Pierre moonlights as a ghostwriter, penning both right-wing political speeches for his father and gossip articles for his friend Patrick, a disreputable journalist working for the local scandal sheet; the newspaper's owner, Patrick's uncle Albert Renaudin, happens to be Hubert Durois's political opponent.

Pierre is engaged to Danielle, another teacher, but his constant blunders, and excessive workload as he juggles activities, hinder their relationship. His eagerness to help, and social awkwardness, cause him to be simultaneously exploited by his father, taken advantage of by Patrick, henpecked by Danielle, and disrespected by his students.

One day, as a practical joke, Pierre's students switch the contents of his folders, mixing their own school work, a speech Pierre wrote for his father, and a newspaper article about Jackie Logan, a famous Hollywood actress currently making a spaghetti western in the area.

Pierre tries to resolve the mix-up and prevent the papers from ending up in the wrong hands. A series of chaotic mishaps leads him to meet Jackie Logan in person and spend the night at her villa.

Although nothing untoward happens between Jackie and Pierre, the story about the film star meeting the mayor's son is immediately leaked to the tabloid press. Renaudin, who prepares to run for mayor against Pierre's father, is delighted to cause embarrassment for his rival.

Jackie is having a secret affair with a high-ranking U.S. diplomat (a thinly veiled Henry Kissinger analogue); both to generate publicity for herself and to obfuscate her own dalliance, she happily confirms to the press her affair with Pierre, whom she describes as a sex symbol and the best lover she ever had.

Pierre is initially unaware of the media frenzy involving him, and does not understand why the girls in his class suddenly find him irresistible; the high-schoolers end up actually harassing Pierre, who is forced to flee from his own students. The headlines provoke dismay both for Hubert Durois and for Danielle, as Pierre finds himself hounded by the media and desperate to dispel the rumors.

Pierre pursues Jackie across her film set, eventually convincing her to show the media that their affair was a sham. To prove that they're not in love, the two fake a fight in front of journalists and paparazzi.

Later, Pierre's father hosts a rally at the local theater, to refute the story once and for all, and relaunch his campaign. Having completed her film, Jackie meets Pierre backstage to say goodbye to him; this leads to a fight between a jealous Danielle and Jackie, with Pierre attempting to separate them. Pierre accidentally causes the theater curtain to opens, revealing him, Danielle, and Jackie to the audience and the journalists present, and making it appear that, instead of fighting, they're having a wild threesome. The rally erupts into chaos, while Patrick eagerly takes photos; a totally befuddled Pierre is grabbed onstage by security and sent flying into the crowd, with the photo of his plunge making the next day's headlines.

== Cast ==
- Pierre Richard as Pierre Durois
- Jane Birkin as Jackie Logan
- Claude Piéplu as Dr. Hubert Durois
- Jean Martin as the headmaster
- Danielle Minazzoli as Danielle
- Vittorio Caprioli as the film director
- Julien Guiomar as Albert Renaudin
- Henri Guybet as Patrick
- Jean-Marie Proslier as the car driver
- Clément Harari as Harry Welsinger
- Bruno Balp as Grégoire
- Manu Pluton as security guard

== Production ==
The project was originally pitched to Jean-Paul Belmondo, and envisioned as an action comedy featuring spectacular stunt sequences. However, Belmondo had just shot back-to-back several films involving dangerous action scenes, and was unwilling to commit himself immediately to a similar project. The role then went to Pierre Richard; the actor was initially hesitant to work with Claude Zidi, whom critics associated at the time with low comedy, but was ultimately convinced.

Richard rewrote the script together with Zidi and Michel Fabre; the action and stunt scenes were reworked as slapstick sequences better suited to Richard's screen persona. Richard also suggested casting Brigitte Bardot in the lead female role; however, Bardot had just decided to retire from acting, and Jane Birkin was eventually cast. Birkin later said that she had been hesitant to accept the role, being still insecure at the time about her own star power. According to her account, she told Zidi that he should cast a "real star" instead; Zidi answered that the film would certainly make her one.

In addition to being a starring vehicle for Pierre Richard, La moutarde me monte au nez ! was one of many comedy films produced during the 1970s by Christian Fechner, who established himself at the time as one of France's most dynamic producers of mainstream entertainment films.

The film was shot in Southern France; some scenes were filmed at the Victorine Studios in Nice, while locations included Aix-en-Provence and Gardanne. During production, Richard became enthusiastic about the dailies; convinced of the film's potential, he personally asked Vladimir Cosma to compose the score. Cosma, who had seen none of Zidi's films but was aware of the director's low critical standing, was skeptical but eventually accepted.

== Reception ==
La moutarde me monte au nez ! was a major box-office hit in France, selling over 3.7 million admissions. It was also a significant success in Germany, where it sold 1.3 million admissions.

While Claude Zidi's previous comedies had been poorly received by French critics, this film reversed the trend, with most reviewers praising Richard's performance and the fast-paced story. In a later review, Télérama looked back positively at the film, commenting that while no masterpiece it remained a funny and good-natured farce, thanks notably to Pierre Richard's "super blunderer" persona.

One year after this film, Richard and Birkin renewed their pairing in another comedy also directed by Zidi, La Course à l'échalote (known in English as The Wild Goose Chase).

== Home video ==
The film was reissued on DVD and Blu-Ray., and released on VOD on several streaming services, including Amazon Prime, Canal+ and Apple TV.
