= The Umbrella Coup =

1980 French comedy film

- Film poster
- Directed by: Gérard Oury
- Written by: Gérard Oury; Danièle Thompson
- Produced by: Alain Poiré
- Starring: Pierre Richard; Valérie Mairesse; Gordon Mitchell; Gert Fröbe
- Cinematography: Henri Decaë
- Edited by: Albert Jurgenson
- Music by: Vladimir Cosma
- Production company: Gaumont International
- Distributed by: Gaumont Distribution
- Release date: 8 October 1980
- Running time: 98 minutes
- Country: France
- Language: French
- Box office: $18.4 million

The Umbrella Coup (French: Le Coup du parapluie, also translating as The Umbrella Stroke) is a 1980 French comedy film directed by Gérard Oury, starring Pierre Richard and Valérie Mairesse. Both a comedy of errors and a parody of spy films, it tells the story of a second-rate, down-on-his-luck actor who unwittingly becomes involved in an international assassination plot, while believing he is working on a film project. The film also features Gordon Mitchell and Gert Fröbe as antagonists. The title refers to the umbrella that the protagonist carries with him as a film prop, unaware that it is a deadly weapon.

The premise of the film was loosely inspired by several Cold War episodes, in which the so-called Bulgarian umbrella was used to assassinate Bulgarian dissidents.

== Plot ==
Grégoire Lecomte, a struggling actor, leads a carefree existence, accumulating debts and largely living off his girlfriend Josyane, a parking enforcement officer. A compulsive womanizer, Grégoire regularly cheats on Josyane; her colleagues help her monitor him, giving him parking tickets as he visits his lovers.

Grégoire goes to a casting call with his agent Frédo, hoping to land the role of a hitman in a crime film. Unknown to them, the production's offices are next to that of mafia boss Don Barberini, who has an appointment with a real contract killer, Moskovitz.

Grégoire and Frédo encounter Moskovitz, whose sinister looks lead them to believe he is another actor coveting the role; they cause an accident to hinder Moskovitz, while Grégoire rushes to meet the producer. He mistakenly enters the office of Don Barberini, who himself mistakes him for Moskovitz. Barberini explains his mission to Grégoire, who believes he is being told a film plot; he must reach the French Riviera to assassinate Otto Krampe, a.k.a. "the Whale", a corrupt arms dealer. Grégoire leaves, overjoyed at getting the role. Meanwhile, Moskovitz mistakenly enters the offices of the B movie producer Grégoire was supposed to meet, who then believes him to be an actor auditioning for the hitman role; the producer compliments a stupefied Moskovitz over his "ugly mug", until the hitman realizes the misunderstanding and beats him up.

The French secret services, which monitor Krampe and the assassination plot against him, are at a loss to explain Grégoire's involvement; Sylvette, a counterintelligence agent, is tasked with following him. Exasperated with Grégoire's cheating, Josyane kicks him out of their apartment. Grégoire then heads for what he believes will be the film shoot; he meets Sylvette, posing as a "dumb blonde" film fan, and takes her along, hoping to seduce her. Meanwhile, Moskovitz also leaves for the Riviera to complete his mission, and eliminate Grégoire as well.

Salvatore Bozzoni, an associate of Barberini, equips Grégoire with a murder weapon — an umbrella containing a built-in syringe full of potassium cyanide. Believing the umbrella to be a prop for his character, Grégoire handles it carelessly, unintentionally causing danger for himself and others. Bozzoni, a double agent, informs Krampe about Grégoire's mission. One of Krampe's hitmen, "The Fairy", tries to murder Grégoire aboard his plane, but Grégoire inadvertently kills him with the umbrella.

Grégoire and Sylvette arrive at the luxury villa where Krampe is celebrating his birthday. Grégoire thinks he has arrived on the shoot, and happily greets Krampe whom he believes to be his co-star. Josyane, hoping for a reconciliation, rejoins Grégoire, who frantically hides Sylvette from her. At the party, Josyane develops an attraction to Radj Kahn, Krampe's Indian bodyguard, unaware that he is a knife-wielding assassin. Meanwhile, Moskovitz intrudes into the villa.

As the party progresses, Grégoire unwittingly escapes murder attempts. Radj Kahn has a face-off with Moskovitz, who kills him with the umbrella. Moskovitz next tries to kill Grégoire; their encounter evolves into a slapstick, fencing-like fight, with Grégoire believing the hitman to be simply a jealous colleague and unaware of the deadly danger he faces. Later, Josyane stumbles upon Radj Kahn's corpse and tries to seduce him, only belatedly realizing that he is dead.

Moskovitz kills Krampe with the umbrella; he prepares to kill Grégoire as well, but is shot dead by Sylvette. Grégoire finally understands that he had been in danger all along, as Sylvette explains her undercover mission to him. Grégoire, realizing the events would make an excellent movie plot, decides to turn his ordeal into a film.

In the epilogue, Grégoire and Sylvette, now married, premiere their film at the Cannes Film Festival. Grégoire is the director, screenwriter, and lead actor, while Don Barberini serves as the film's producer. As they exit the showing, Grégoire finds a parking ticket on his windshield, and understands that Josyane is stalking him again.

== Cast ==
- Pierre Richard as Grégoire Lecomte
- Valérie Mairesse as Sylvette a.k.a. Bunny
- Gordon Mitchell as Moskovitz
- Gert Fröbe as Otto Krampe a.k.a. "The Whale"
- Christine Murillo as Josyane Leblanc
- Gérard Jugnot as Frédo
- Vittorio Caprioli as Don Barberini
- Mike Marshall as "The Doctor", Krampe's right-hand man
- Yaseen Khan as Radj Kahn
- Roger Carel as Salvatore Bozzoni
- Dominique Lavanant as Mireille
- Didier Sauvegrain as Stanislas Lefort a.k.a. "The Fairy"
- Tiberio Murgia as Don Barberini's assistant
- Maurice Risch as film producer
- Raymond Gérôme as secret services chief
- Axelle Abbadie as Juliette, Grégoire's estranged wife
- Philippe Bruneau as Didier, Juliette's boyfriend
- Marie-Pierre Casey as parking enforcement officer
- Léon Zitrone as himself (voice only)

== Production ==
As a direct reference to the film's real-life inspiration, the working title was Le Coup du Parapluie Bulgare (lit. 'The Bulgarian Umbrella Stroke'). The reference to Bulgaria was dropped from the title at the request of producer Alain Poiré.

Interiors were shot at the Épinay Studios; filming locations included Paris, Nice, Cannes, Hyères, Saint-Tropez, and Rayol-Canadel-sur-Mer. The film's sets were designed by the art director Jean André, while stunts were coordinated by Rémy Julienne.

The film was a starring vehicle for Pierre Richard, whose brand of slapstick humor had made him one of France's most popular film comedians during the 1970s. It was Richard's second collaboration with director Gérard Oury, following La Carapate two years earlier. At the time, Richard was seeking to expand his range; while maintaining his hallmark physical humor and bumbling persona, he occasionally portrayed characters who were less innocent, moving toward more cynical or opportunistic roles. Whereas in previous films his characters were depicted as hapless in their romantic relationships, the one he plays in The Umbrella Coup, while immature, is successful and carefree in seducing women. However, the film also remains consistent with his previous roles in that his character experiences professional failure.

The film also featured in supporting roles several actors, including Gérard Jugnot, Valérie Mairesse and Dominique Lavanant, associated with France's café-théâtre scene, which would expand during the 1980s into the main trend of French comedy films.

== Reception ==
Le Coup du parapluie was a box-office hit in France, selling over 2.4 million admissions.

Upon release, Jean de Baroncelli of Le Monde gave the film a positive review, praising its humor, pacing and inventive slapstick, as well as its mix of French farce narrative devices with crime fiction archetypes. In a 2026 review, Mathilde Blottière of Télérama argued that the film's humor had aged poorly, with some gags appearing to be sexist, homophobic and racist; however, she remained appreciative of Pierre Richard's performance, and of his "genius" blundering persona. That same year, Thomas Colpaert of the magazine Télé Loisirs called the film a "classic" of French comedy, praising its "irresistible" humor.

== Home video ==
The film was reissued on DVD and Blu-Ray, and on VOD on several streaming services including Amazon Prime, Canal+ and Apple TV.

== See also ==
- Never a Dull Moment (1968)
