= Robert Dalban =

French actor (1903–1987)

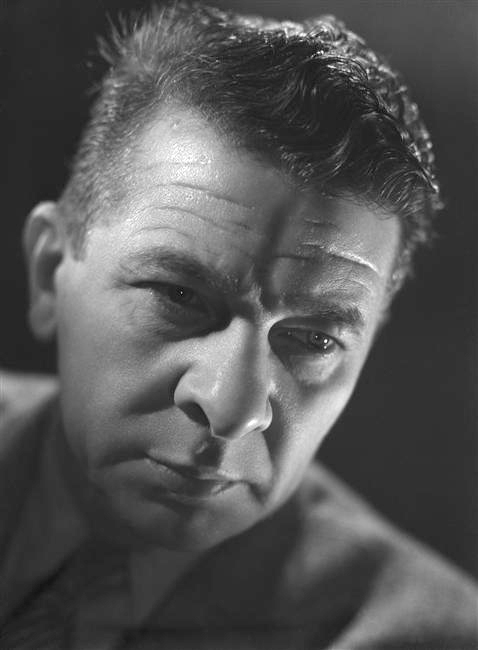
- Robert Dalban
- Born: Gaston Paul Barré; 19 July 1903; Celles-sur-Belle
- Died: 3 April 1987 (aged 83); Paris
- Occupation: Actor
- Years active: 1934–1983
- Notable work: Mon oncle Benjamin; Les Tontons flingueurs Fantômas

Robert Dalban (born Gaston Barré; 19 July 1903 – 3 April 1987) was a French actor. His work included stage acting, roles in TV shows and dubbing American stars. Moreover, he was a fixture in French cinema for many decades.

== Selected filmography ==
- 1934: Gold in the Street (by Curtis Bernhardt) - L'homme à la gare (uncredited)
- 1937: Passeurs d'hommes
- 1939: Deuxième bureau contre Kommandantur (by René Jayet et Robert Bibal) - Un officier allemand
- 1945: Boule de suif by Christian-Jaque : Prussian man called Oskar
- 1945: The Last Judgment
- 1947: Quai des Orfèvres by Henri-Georges Clouzot : car thief Paulo
- 1947: Les jeux sont faits by Jean Delannoy : Georges'
- 1949: Berlin Express by Jacques Tourneur : chief of the French secret service'
- 1949: Manon by Henri-Georges Clouzot : hotel keeper
- 1949: The Walls of Malapaga by René Clément : mariner
- 1950: A Man Walks in the City by Marcello Pagliero: Laurent
- 1951: The Passerby by Henri Calef : smuggler
- 1952: They Were Five by Jack Pinoteau : manager
- 1952: The Seven Deadly Sins by Georges Lacombe : the showman in : „The Eighth Sin“
- 1952: La Minute de vérité by Jean Delannoy : Mr Taboureau
- 1953: Their Last Night
- 1954: Service Entrance by Carlo Rim: Jules' friend
- 1954: Obsession by Jean Delannoy : inspector Chardin
- 1954: Destinées by Jean Delannoy : D'Aulon in "The miracle of Jeanne d'Arc"
- 1955: Les Diaboliques by Henri-Georges Clouzot : the mechanic
- 1955: The Little Rebels by Jean Delannoy : Joseph
- 1956: Les Truands by Carlo Rim : Pepito Benoît
- 1956: La Loi des rues by Ralph Habib : trucker
- 1956: The Lebanese Mission by Richard Pottier : Malek
- 1956: Le Chanteur de Mexico by Richard Pottier : employé of the theatre
- 1956: Maid in Paris by Pierre Gaspard-Huit
- 1956: I'll Get Back to Kandara
- 1957: The River of Three Junks
- 1957: La Tour, prends garde ! by Georges Lampin : Barberin
- 1957: Les Espions by Henri-Georges Clouzot
- 1958: Marie-Octobre by Julien Duvivier : Léon Blanchet, the locksmith
- 1959: Witness in the Cityby Édouard Molinaro : Raymond
- 1959: Pourquoi viens-tu si tard? by Henri Decoin : street hawker
- 1960: Boulevard by Julien Duvivier : street hawker
- 1961: Please, Not Now! by Roger Vadim
- 1961: Rendezvous by Jean Delannoy
- 1961: Le Miracle des loups by André Hunebelle : the courier
- 1962: Madame Sans-Gêne by Christian-Jaque : instructor
- 1962: The Mysteries of Paris d'André Hunebelle : inn keeper
- 1963: Vice and Virtue by Roger Vadim : German officer
- 1963: Les Tontons flingueurs by Georges Lautner : Jean
- 1963: Hardi Pardaillan! by Bernard Borderie
- 1964: Fantômas by André Hunebelle : editor-in-chief
- 1965: The Man from Cocody by Christian-Jaque : Pépé
- 1965: Trap for Cinderella by André Cayatte : Bayen, mechanic
- 1965: Fantômas se déchaîne by André Hunebelle : editor-in-chief
- 1966: Fantômas contre Scotland Yard by André Hunebelle : editor-in-chief
- 1966: The Big Restaurant (by Jacques Besnard) - the French conspirator
- 1969: My Uncle Benjamin (by Edouard Molinaro) - Jean-François, inn keeper
- 1969: The Brain by Gérard Oury : Belgian soldier
- 1970: Le Distrait by Pierre Richard : Mazelin
- 1971: Les Malheurs d'Alfred by Pierre Richard : Gustave, the driver
- 1971: Le Cri du cormoran, le soir au-dessus des jonques by Michel Audiard
- 1972: The Tall Blond Man with One Black Shoe by Yves Robert : the florist
- 1973: Comment réussir quand on est con et pleurnichard by Michel Audiard : Léonce, bistrot keeper
- 1973: Hail the Artist by Yves Robert : concierge
- 1973: Now Where Did the 7th Company Get to? by Robert Lamoureux : the peasant
- 1974: Comme un pot de fraises by Jean Aurel : salesman
- 1975: Incorrigible by Philippe de Broca : Freddy
- 1975: Only the Wind Knows the Answer
- 1976: Dracula and Son by Edouard Molinaro : concierge
- 1978: Coup de tête by Jean-Jacques Annaud : Jeanjean
- 1980: The Umbrella Coup by Gérard Oury : Jean-Robert
- 1980: La Boum by Claude Pinoteau : Serge, the waiter
- 1981: La Chèvre by Francis Veber : the locksmith
- 1982: Les Misérables by Robert Hossein : the coachman
- 1982: La Boum 2 by Claude Pinoteau : Serge, the waiter
- 1983: Les Compères by Francis Veber : the concierge
- 1984: P'tit Con by Gérard Lauzier : the concierge
