= Stéphane Bern =

French-Luxembourgish journalist, radio host and television presenter (born 1963)

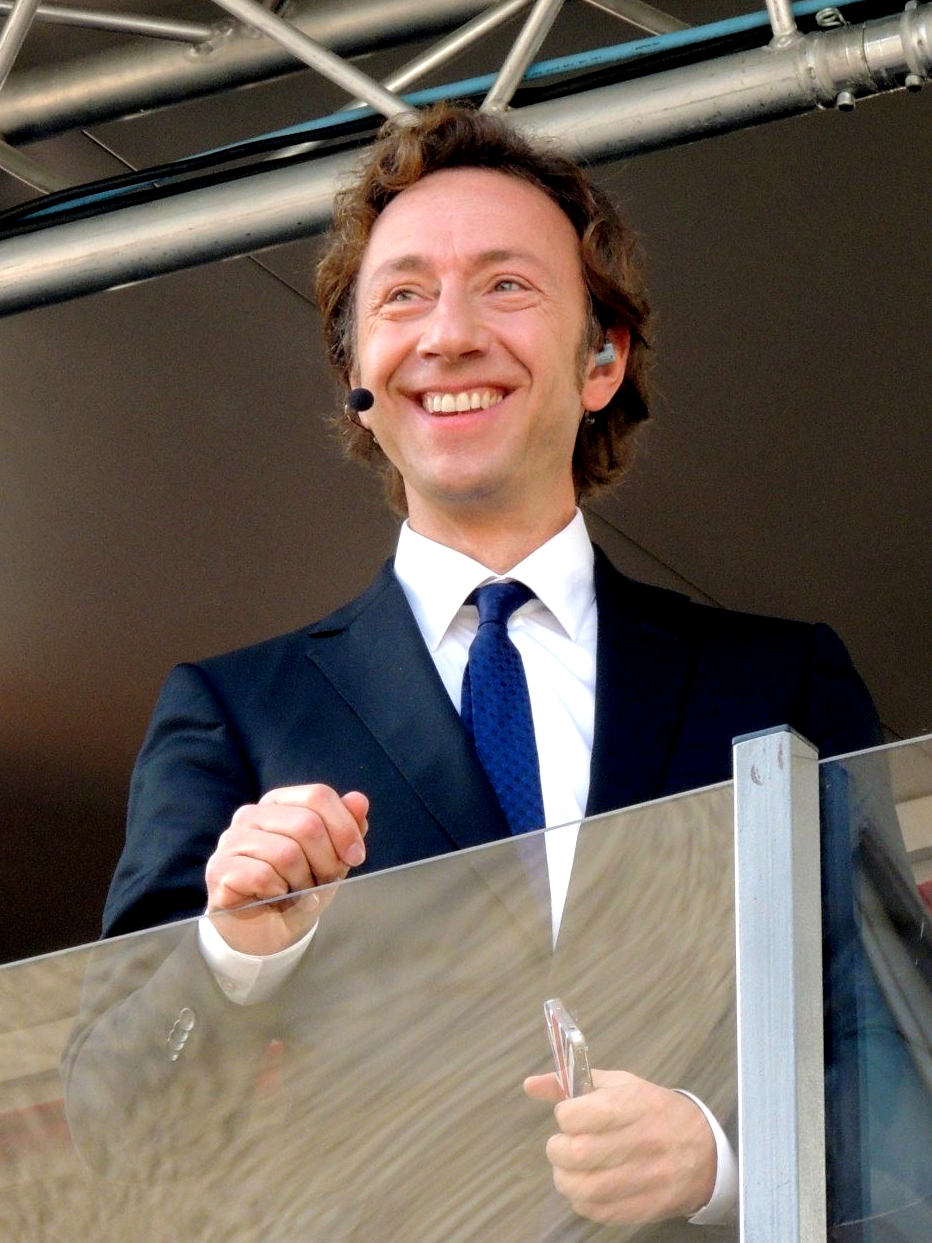
- Bern in 2012
- Born: 14 November 1963 (age 62); Lyon, France
- Education: École de management de Lyon
- Occupations: Journalist, radio host and television presenter

Stéphane Bern (French pronunciation: [stefan bɛʁn]; born 14 November 1963) is a French-Luxembourgish journalist, radio host and television presenter. He is known as a specialist in heritage, nobility and royalty. He has been awarded honours by several nations, including the Legion of Honour (France), the Order of Grimaldi (Monaco), and the Order of the British Empire (United Kingdom).

== Education and personal life ==
Bern went to high school at the Lycée Carnot in Paris, and graduated from the École de management de Lyon in 1985. His parents, Melita Schlanger and Louis Bern, were born to Polish parents from Jewish families who had emigrated to Switzerland and France before World War II.

He came out in the magazine Têtu in October 2009 and in the documentary Vie privée, vie publique (by Mireille Dumas), which aired on France 3 on 6 November 2009.

== Career ==
=== Magazines ===
Bern was editor of the magazine Dynasty from 1985 to 1987, and then worked as a journalist for Jours de France in 1988. Since 1999, he has been the deputy editor (Events section) of the magazine Le Figaro Madame.

=== Radio ===
Bern chronicled various royal families on Europe 1 from 1992 to 1997 before joining Radio Télévision Luxembourg and participating in the show Les Grosses Têtes. Since 2000, he has produced and hosted the show Le Fou du roi on France Inter, which is the most listened-to show in France during this time slot. He hosts Historiquement Vôtre with Mathieu Noël on Europe 1 since September 2020.

=== Television ===
Selected list

- 1998–2003: Sagas (TF1)
- 2003–06: 20 h 10 pétantes, which became Friday pétantes and Saturday pétantes (Canal+)
- 2006–07: L'Arène de France (France 2)
- 2007: Pourquoi les manchots n'ont-ils pas froid aux pieds ? ("Why don't penguins get cold feet?") (France 2)
- 2007: Secrets d'histoire (France 2)
- 2010: A program in honor of Philippe Bouvard, in January 2010 on the occasion of his fifty years of television (France 2)
- 2010: Comment ça va bien ! (France 2)
- 2015–present: Eurovision Song Contest as co-commentator of France in the final (France 2)
- 2018–present: Junior Eurovision Song Contest as co-commentator of France (France 2)
- 2021–2022: co-host of Eurovision France, c'est vous qui décidez ! (France 2)

== Public service ==
He was a member of the Nouvelle Action Royaliste political movement for 18 years, but left in 1999. He was alderman of the 9th arrondissement of Paris from 1999 to 2001, then President of the Conservatory of Music of that area.

A member since its inception in January 2001 of the Academy Grevin, he inaugurated the Grevin Wax Museum on 10 March 2008. Bern is also a member of the Cercle de l'Union interalliée and the Institute of the Royal House of France, and a sponsor of the Youth Club of that institute.

He was appointed by President Emmanuel Macron to raise funds for the national heritage.

== Opinions ==
Bern criticised the demolition of the historic Saint-Joseph Chapel of Saint-Paul College in Lille.

== Works ==
- Grace Kelly (2007), co-edited by Albin Michel – Nostalgie, Paris, 2007, 139 p. ISBN 978-2-226-15220-6
- Oubliez-moi, (2009) ed. Flammarion, Paris ISBN 978-2081208506
- Une vie de chien. Les animaux chéris des grands de ce monde, (2009) ed. Albin Michel, Paris ISBN 978-2226192950
- Au coeur de l'Écosse, (2009) ed. Flammarion, Paris, in collaboration with Franck Ferrand, William de Laubier, and Angelika Cawdor. ISBN 978-2-08-122670-8
- Le livre fou… du roi, (2010) ed. Flammarion, Paris ISBN 978-2081233430
- Secrets d'histoire, (2010) ed. Albin Michel, Paris
- Dictionnaire amoureux des royautés, (2010) ed. Plon, Paris ISBN 978-2259206099

== Filmography ==
- 2003: Laisse tes mains sur mes hanches directed by Chantal Lauby
- 2006: Les aristos directed by Charlotte de Turckheim
- 2015: Connasse, Princesse des cœurs directed by Eloïse Lang and Noémie Saglio
- 2015: Merci pour tout, Charles directed by Ernesto Oña
- 2017: The Lego Batman Movie directed by Chris McKay: Alfred Pennyworth (French dubbing)
- 2018: Meurtres en Lorraine by René Manzor : Nicolas Muller
- 2018: Mrs. Mills directed by Sophie Marceau.

== Honours ==
=== National honours ===
- France:
  - Officer of the Ordre des Arts et des Lettres (Order of Arts and Letters) in January 2010.
  - Knight of the Legion of Honour in December 2018.

=== Foreign honours ===
- Monaco: Knight of the Order of Grimaldi in November 2011.
- Luxembourg: Commander with crown of the Order of Adolphe of Nassau in January 2013. Commander of the Order of Merit of the Grand Duchy of Luxembourg.
- Belgium: Officer of the Order of Leopold in March 2013.
- United Kingdom: Honorary Member of the Order of the British Empire (MBE) in June 2014.
- Greece: Officer of the Order of Honour in 2015.
- (Kingdom of the Two Sicilies) Two Sicilian Royal Family: Commander of Merit with star of the Sacred Military Constantinian Order of Saint George in 2019.
