= Oscar (1967 film) =

- Directed by: Édouard Molinaro
- Written by: Louis de Funès; Jean Halain; Claude Magnier (play); Édouard Molinaro
- Produced by: Alain Poiré
- Starring: Louis de Funès; Claude Rich; Claude Gensac; Agathe Natanson; Mario David
- Cinematography: Raymond Pierre Lemoigne
- Edited by: Monique Isnardon; Robert Isnardon
- Music by: Georges Delerue; Jean Marion
- Distributed by: Gaumont Distribution
- Release date: 1967
- Running time: 85 minutes
- Country: France
- Language: French
- Box office: $45.9 million

Oscar is a 1967 French comedy of errors directed by Édouard Molinaro and starring Louis de Funès. In the movie, Louis de Funès plays an industrialist named Bertrand Barnier who discovers over the course of a single day that his daughter is pregnant, he has been robbed by an employee, and various other calamities have befallen his household and his business.

An English-language version of the movie was made in 1991, by John Landis, under the same name and starring Sylvester Stallone.

== Plot ==
Christian Martin, a modest accountant in a large firm owned by Bertrand Barnier, surprises his boss by asking him for a 100% increase in his wages. Martin is on the point of proposing to a girl and doesn't want to ask for her hand in marriage while making a lowly accountant's salary.

After Barnier refuses to give him the raise, Martin tells him that he's stolen more than sixty million francs from him by falsifying the firm's accounting records. When Barnier threatens to report this to the police, Martin points out that as a consequence of the fraud Barnier has now submitted false income statements to the tax office, a serious crime. Barnier has no choice but to give in to blackmail and he agrees to give Martin the raise and name him vice-president of the firm.

Martin then reveals that the young woman whom he intends to marry is Barnier's daughter. In order to recover his sixty million francs, Barnier asks Martin to give back the stolen monies so that he can give them to his daughter as a wedding present.

Barnier learns that Martin converted the sum into jewelry and the jewels are in a bank. He tells Martin to get the jewelry, but Martin refuses without a signed document from Barnier stating that he will give the jewelry to his daughter as a wedding present. Barnier agrees and Martin leaves for the bank.

While Martin is gone, Barnier talks to his daughter Colette. Without mentioning Martin, he tells her that he's opposed to her marriage which causes her to break down and cry. On the advice of her maid Bernadette, Colette lies to her father and tells him that she's pregnant by her lover. Hearing this, Barnier decides to approve the marriage and give the sixty million francs/jewelry to Colette as a wedding present.

After Barnier's talk with Colette a young woman named Jacqueline Bouillotte comes to see him. She tells Barnier that she's in love with Christian Martin and that she lied to him and told him that she was Barnier's daughter. Barnier realizes that this means that Martin is not in love with his daughter Colette. It also dawns on him that he won’t be able to get his sixty million francs back from Martin or his daughter since they won’t be getting married.

Upon confronting Colette, Barnier learns that she's in love with Oscar the chauffeur. At that moment Martin comes back from the bank and Barnier gets the jewelry, now in a black suitcase, from him. Martin then learns that Jacqueline has lied to him about being Barnier's daughter, which causes them to argue and break up.

In the meantime Barnier has discovered that Oscar had joined a six-year polar expedition due to a "disappointment of love" (not being able to marry Colette.) Barnier tells Martin that he'll give him back the suitcase with the jewelry if he'll marry Colette. Martin hesitates and tries to put Barnier on to a new "pigeon": Philippe Dubois, Barnier's masseur.

During this time, Colette's maid Bernadette announces her resignation and packs her suitcase; she is going to marry Colette's former fiancé the Baron Honoré de la Butinière. Before she leaves the house Bernadette puts down her suitcase filled with clothes and accidentally picks up the suitcase containing the sixty million francs worth of jewelry.

Barnier tries to persuade his masseur to marry his daughter Colette, promising to give him the suitcase full of jewelry as a wedding present. Barnier almost has a heart attack when Dubois opens the suitcase and finds clothes inside instead of jewels.

At this point, Martin comes back and tells Barnier that before he had gone to the bank, while they were discussing giving the jewelry to Colette as a wedding present, he had hidden a piece of paper among the documents. When Barnier had signed an agreement to give Colette the jewelry, he had also signed a document giving Martin banking power of attorney. This allowed Martin to divert sixty million more francs from Barnier's accounts. Martin offers to exchange this second stolen sum for the jewelry representing the first stolen sum.

Barnier gives Martin the suitcase with the jewelry thinking it's the suitcase full of clothes. However, unbeknownst to him Bernadette's driver had come back with the suitcase of jewelry and exchanged it for the suitcase of clothes. Barnier, thinking he's given Martin the clothes, invents an address for Jacqueline, Martin's true love, and sends him on his way.

After a series of comic errors, Barnier again finds himself with Bernadette's suitcase full of clothes. After a funny telephone conversation with the Baron, Bernadette's new husband, Barnier recovers the suitcase filled with jewelry from Martin who has discovered that the address Barnier had given him for Jacqueline is wrong. Barnier, pleased to have finally recovered the suitcase filled with jewelry confesses to inventing the address to get rid of Martin and tells him that Jacqueline (who had come back earlier) is in fact in Barnier's office.

While all of this is going on a lady named Charlotte enters the house. She's been sent by the employment agency to replace Bernadette as Colette's maid. She tells Barnier that when she was younger she worked for the Barnier family and that she had a daughter who is now engaged to a man named Christian Martin. Barnier realizes that the young woman being discussed is Jacqueline and Charlotte reveals that Jacqueline is in fact Charlotte and Barnier's daughter. Barnier needs several minutes to recover from the shock during which time Oscar returns home to Colette and all seems to end well.

However...while everybody is congratulating each other, Bernadette arrives thinking that there has been a mistake with the suitcases. Not wanting to disturb anyone she inconspicuously exchanges the suitcases. Barnier asks Martin to open the now famous suitcase, thinking that he is going to take the jewelry out of it and give it to his daughters as a wedding present. He has an apoplectic fit on seeing that it's full of clothes. Everybody jumps in cars, on motorbikes, and on bicycles to go to Bernadette's and recover the suitcase of jewelry once and for all.

== Cast ==
- Louis de Funès: Bertrand Barnier
- Claude Rich: Christian Martin
- Mario David: Philippe Dubois
- Germaine Delbat: Charlotte Bouillotte
- Claude Gensac: Germaine Barnier
- Agathe Natanson: Colette Barnier
- Dominique Page: Bernadette
- Paul Préboist: Charles (the butler)
- Sylvia Saurel : Jacqueline Bouillotte
- Philippe Valauris: The Baron's chauffeur
- Roger Van Hool: Oscar

== Credits ==
- Director: Edward Molinaro
- Producer: Alain Poiré
- Writers: Louis de Funès and Edward Molinaro, based on the successful play by Claude Magnier
- Starring: Louis de Funès, Claude Gensac
- Rated G (General Audience) in France
- Language: French
