= Witness in the City =

1959 film

- Directed by: Édouard Molinaro
- Written by: Pierre Boileau; Thomas Narcejac; Gérard Oury; Georges Tabet; André Tabet; Alain Poiré; Édouard Molinaro
- Produced by: Henry Deutschmeister; Moris Ergas; Alain Poiré
- Starring: Lino Ventura; Sandra Milo; Franco Fabrizi
- Cinematography: Henri Decaë
- Edited by: Monique Isnardon; Robert Isnardon
- Music by: Barney Wilen
- Production companies: Franco London Films; Paris Union Films; Société Nouvelle des Établissements Gaumont; Tempo Film; Zebra Films
- Distributed by: Gaumont (France); Metro-Goldwyn-Mayer (Italy); Constantin Film (W. Germany)
- Release date: 6 May 1959
- Running time: 89 minutes
- Countries: France; Italy
- Language: French

Witness in the City (French: Un témoin dans la ville, Italian: Appuntamento con il delitto) is a 1959 French-Italian crime thriller film directed by Édouard Molinaro and starring Lino Ventura, Sandra Milo and Franco Fabrizi. It was shot at the Saint-Maurice Studios in Paris and on location across the city. The film's sets were designed by the art director Georges Lévy. Its score was written by Kenny Dorham. It has been classified as a film noir.

== Synopsis ==
Discovering that the man his wife had been having an affair with has murdered her by throwing her off a train, the businessman Ancelin takes revenge by killing him. However he is spotted leaving the scene of the crime by a taxi driver. Although unaware of what he has seen, Ancelin believes he needs to murder this potential witness as well.

== Cast ==
- Lino Ventura as Ancelin
- Sandra Milo as Liliane
- Franco Fabrizi as Lambert - le radio-taxi de nuit
- Jacques Berthier as Pierre Verdier
- Daniel Ceccaldi as Le client du taxi italien
- Robert Dalban as Raymond - un chauffeur de taxi
- Jacques Jouanneau as Le loueur de voitures
- Micheline Luccioni as Germaine - une radio taxi
- Ginette Pigeon as Muriel - la prostituée
- Janine Darcey as La propriétaire de l'hôtel
- Françoise Brion as Jeanne Ancelin
- Geneviève Cluny as La speakerine
- Joëlle Janin as Une standardiste
- Nicole Alexandra as Une standardiste
- Claire Nicole as Une standardiste
- Martine Messager as Une standardiste
- Paul Bisciglia as Un chauffeur de taxi
- Henri Belly as Louis dit Petit Louis
- Michel Etcheverry as Le juge d'instruction
- Alain Nobis as L'auteur de l'accident avec Verdier
- Jacques Monod as L'avocat de Verdier
- Jean Lara as M. Catherine
- Gérard Darrieu as Pierre - le collègue d'Ancelin
- Jean Daurand as Bernard - un habitué du café
- Charles Bouillaud as Un chauffeur de taxi ami de Raymond
- René Hell as Grand-père
- Billy Kearns as Le soldat américain

== Bibliography ==
- Bessy, Maurice & Chirat, Raymond. Histoire du cinéma français: 1956-1960. Pygmalion, 1986.
- Grant, John. A Comprehensive Encyclopedia of Film Noir: The Essential Reference Guide. Rowman & Littlefield, 2023.
- Rège, Philippe. Encyclopedia of French Film Directors, Volume 1. Scarecrow Press, 2009.
- Wager, Jans B. Jazz and Cocktails: Rethinking Race and the Sound of Film Noir. University of Texas Press, 2017.
