= The Castaways of Turtle Island =

- Les Naufragés de l'Île de la Tortue
- Directed by: Jacques Rozier
- Starring: Pierre Richard, Maurice Risch, Jacques Villeret, Pierre Barouh
- Release date: 6 October 1976 (France)
- Running time: 140 min
- Country: France
- Language: French

The Castaways of Turtle Island (French: Les Naufragés de l'île de la Tortue) is a 1976 French adventure-comedy film directed by Jacques Rozier.

== Plot ==
The film revolves around travel agents who propose to their clients a new idea: an adventure-like life on a desert island on a very low budget.

== Cast ==
- Pierre Richard : Jean-Arthur Bonaventure
- Maurice Risch : Joël Dupoirier a.k.a. "Gros Nono"
- Jacques Villeret : Bernard Dupoirier a.k.a. "Petit Nono"
- Tanya Lopert : Yolande
- Jean-François Balmer : the "Big Boss"
- Pierre Barouh : unhappy client
- Patrick Chesnais : Gérard
- Alain Sarde : agency manager
- Naná Vasconcelos : musicien
- Bernard Dumaine : chief of staff

== Production ==
It is one of the four feature films directed by Rozier. Production was hindered by financial difficulties, only overcome thanks to Pierre Richard's personal efforts.

Principal photography took place in Paris, Guadeloupe and in the Dominican Republic. Rozier was unable to stick to a work schedule and filming dragged on, until Richard had to abandon the production before filming was complete, due to other engagements, the plot for the remaining of the film was therefore adapted to his absence, and his character is conveniently sent to jail—remaining off-screen for several scenes toward the end.

== Release ==
The film was a box-office bomb.

== Reception ==
Despite its commercial failure, the film received very positive retrospective response.
