= A Happy Man (2009 film) =

- French: Le Bonheur de Pierre
- Directed by: Robert Ménard
- Written by: Guy Bonnier
- Produced by: Guy Bonnier; Claude Bonin
- Starring: Pierre Richard; Sylvie Testud; Rémy Girard
- Narrated by: Pierre Richard
- Cinematography: Pierre Mignot
- Edited by: Michel Arcand
- Music by: Sébastien Souchois
- Release dates: 27 February 2009 (Canada); 24 February 2010 (France)
- Running time: 106 minutes
- Countries: Canada; France
- Language: French
- Box office: $82.000

A Happy Man (French: Le Bonheur de Pierre) is a 2009 Canadian-French comedy-drama directed by Robert Ménard. It was entered into several film festivals including the Rhode Island International Film Festival. Moreover, it was chosen Best Foreign Film at the New York Independent Film Festival in 2009. The film is also known as A Happy Man.

== Plot ==
French professor Pierre Martin is a widower who lives with his single daughter Catherine. When his aunt Jeanne dies she bequeathers him her guest house in Canada on condition he lives there for a minimum of time. He loves to comply because he has fond childhood memories of this place. In order to make his daughter Catherine accompany him he tells her a great deal of money was also part of Jeanne's heritage. So both of them hurry to the rural little town Sainte Simone du Nord in Canada. The mayor Michel Dolbec knows Jeanne's house will become property of their community if the two Martins don't hold out long enough. He sabotages them several times but they stay. Eventually Pierre Martin and Michel Dolbec become friends after all.

== Cast ==
- Pierre Richard as Pierre Martin,
- Rémy Girard as Michel Dolbec
- Sylvie Testud as Catherine Martin
- Louise Portal as Louise Dolbec, Michel Dolbec's wife
- Jean-Nicolas Verreault as Mario Vaillant
- Patrick Drolet as Steven Dolbec, Michel Dolbec's son
- Gaston Lepage as Ti-Guy, the plumber
- Diane Lavallée as Pauline
- Vincent Bilodeau as Raymond

== Reception ==
The film received mixed reviews. It was praised as a "touching politically incorrect comedy". Yet its narrativity been blamed for a lack of rigour. The film has a user rating of 5.2 due to mixed critic reviews on IMDb.

== DVD release ==
A NTSC version of Le Bonheur de Pierre has been released on DVD in winter 2009.
