= Mr. Stein Goes Online =

- French: Un profil pour deux
- Directed by: Stéphane Robelin
- Starring: Pierre Richard; Yaniss Lespert
- Release date: 19 January 2017
- Running time: 1h 39min
- Country: France
- Language: French
- Box office: $3.4 million

Mr. Stein Goes Online (French: Un profil pour deux) is a 2017 French comedy film directed by Stéphane Robelin.

== Cast ==
- Pierre Richard - Pierre Stein
- Yaniss Lespert - Alex
- Fanny Valette - Flora
- Stéphane Bissot - Sylvie
- Stéphanie Crayencour - Juliette
- Gustave Kervern - Bernard
- Macha Méril - Marie
- Anna Bederke - Madeleine

== Reception ==
On review aggregator Rotten Tomatoes, the film holds an approval rating of 44%, based on 9 reviews with an average rating of 5.2/10.
