= Mrs. Mills (film) =

2018 film by Sophie Marceau

- Theatrical release poster
- French: M^{me} Mills, une voisine si parfaite
- Directed by: Sophie Marceau
- Written by: Sophie Marceau
- Starring: Sophie Marceau; Pierre Richard; Nicolas Vaude; Bastien Ughetto; Léna Bréban; Dong Fu Lin; Gaël Zaks; Stéphane Tissot; Daniel Goldenberg
- Cinematography: Myriam Vinocour
- Edited by: Véronique Lange; Frédéric Barbe
- Music by: Laurent Perez Del Mar
- Production companies: Les Films du Cap; Orange Studio; Lorette Films; Juvénile Productions; DMG Entertainment; Scope Pictures
- Distributed by: UGC Distribution (France); TeleScope Film Distribution (Belgium)
- Release dates: 19 January 2018 (Alpe d'Huez); 7 March 2018 (France and Belgium)
- Running time: 88 minutes
- Countries: France; Belgium; China
- Languages: French; English; Chinese
- Box office: $2.1 million

Mrs. Mills (French: M^{me} Mills, une voisine si parfaite, lit. 'Mrs. Mills, Such a Perfect Neighbor') is a 2018 French comedy written and directed by Sophie Marceau, starring herself, Pierre Richard and Nicolas Vaude. It was shot and set in Shanghai and Paris in French, English and Chinese. The film premiered at the 2018 L'Alpe d'Huez Film Festival, and was released theatrically in France and Belgium on 7 March 2018.

== Synopsis ==
An elderly professional French crook (Mr. Rosenberg / Léonard Chomsky) who would do anything including cross-dressing to commit his mischiefs manages to make his way as "Mrs. Mills" into the home of Hélène Mercier, a workaholic woman obsessed with books. There, he discovers an invualuable object inherited from her grandmother which she would not sell. Mercier is a head of publishing looking for "an optimistic heroine" whom she found in Mrs. Mills. She makes him a big star until the usurpation is revealed and she needs him to stay in character. The film deals with the extraordinary situations generated by this premise.

== Cast ==
- Sophie Marceau as Hélène Mercier
- Pierre Richard as Albert Dupont, alias Mrs. Scarlett Mills / Mr. Rosenberg / Léonard Chomsky
- Nicolas Vaude as Edward
- Bastien Ughetto as Charles
- Léna Bréban as Mathilde
- Dong Fu Lin as Ming Pei
- Gaël Zaks as Stephen Boyd
- Stéphane Tissot as the guardian
- Daniel Goldenberg as the librarian
- Stéphane Bern as himself
- Patrice Carmouze as himself
- Régis Mailhot as himself
- Nikos Aliagas as himself (voice only)
- Augustin Trapenard as himself (voice only)
- Camille Combal as himself (voice only)

== See also ==
- Cinema of France
- List of French-language films
- Cross-dressing in film and television
- Cross-gender acting
- En femme
