= P'tit Con =

- Theatrical release poster
- Directed by: Gérard Lauzier
- Screenplay by: Gérard Lauzier
- Based on: Souvenirs d'un jeune homme by Gérard Lauzier
- Produced by: Alain Poiré
- Starring: Guy Marchand; Caroline Cellier
- Cinematography: Jean-Paul Schwartz
- Edited by: Georges Klotz
- Music by: Vladimir Cosma
- Distributed by: Gaumont Distribution
- Release date: 18 January 1984
- Running time: 90 minutes
- Country: France
- Language: French
- Box office: $3.6 million

P'tit Con is a French comedy film directed by Gérard Lauzier in 1984.

== Plot ==
Stuck at his parents' home, Michel, a teenager, is looking for ways to become a man. The society around him is corrupted, there isn't much to look forward to, the revolution has faded, and he feels that nobody loves him. Not even Salima, the young Algerian that he met on a jaunt in the Parisian night. Only his cool Hippie friend René offers him solace.

== Cast ==
- Guy Marchand as Bob Choupon
- Caroline Cellier as Annie Choupon
- Bernard Brieux as Michel Choupon
- Souad Amidou as Salima
- Josiane Balasko as Rolande
- Gérard Darrieu as the Legionnaire
- Philippe Khorsand as Eric
- Claudine Delvaux as Maryse
- Leila Fréchet as Claudine
- Pierre Fayet as René
- Daniel Auteuil as Jeannot
- Patricia Millardet as Aurore
- Robert Dalban as the Concierge
- Tanya Lopert as the Psychiatrist

== See also ==
- List of French films of 1984
