= Like a Pot of Strawberries =

1974 film by Jean Aurel

Like a Pot of Strawberries (French: Comme un pot de fraises) is a 1974 French comedy film by Jean Aurel.

== Starring ==
- Jean-Claude Brialy (Norbert)
- Nathalie Courval (Joëlle)
- Marcha Grant (Olivia)
- Marianne Eggerickx (Amandine)
- Jean Lefebvre (Adrien)
- Bernard Menez (Philippe)
- Bernard Le Coq (Marc)
- Marco Perrin (Fourmelon)
- Pierre Fuger (Bitza)
- Evelyne Ker (la secrétaire de Fourmelon)
- Hubert de Lapparent (le chef de la publicité)
- Marc Dudicourt (le clochard)
- Bernard Musson (le chef du marketing)
- Jean-Pierre Rambal (le chef de la promotion)
- Robert Dalban (le chef des ventes)
- Rosine Young (une prostituée)
- Paul Bisciglia
- Denise Dax
- José Luccioni
- Bernard Dumaine
- Lydia Feld
- Reni Goliard
- Pia Kazan
- Barbara Laurent
- Guy Michel
