= Pierre Richard =

French actor, film director and screenwriter (born 1934)

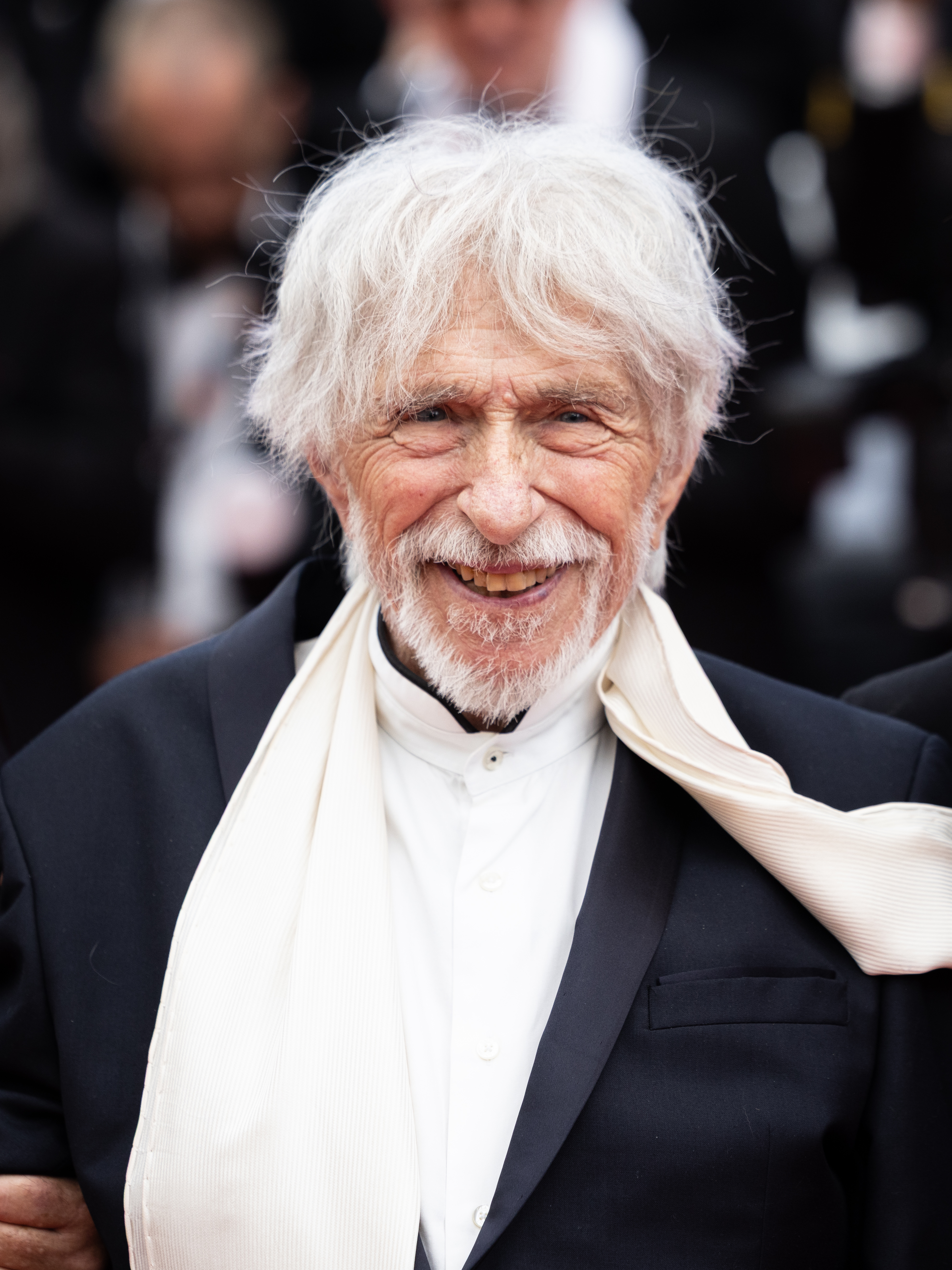
- Richard at the 2025 Cannes Film Festival
- Born: Pierre-Richard Maurice Charles Léopold Defays; 16 August 1934 (age 92); Valenciennes, France
- Occupations: Actor; director; screenwriter
- Years active: 1958–present
- Website: pierre-richard.fr

Pierre Richard (born Pierre-Richard Maurice Charles Léopold Defays; 16 August 1934) is a French actor, film director and screenwriter, best known for his roles in comedy films. Richard rose to prominence in 1970 with the film Le Distrait, which he directed and starred in. He quickly became a prominent comedic star of French cinema, typically playing clumsy and offbeat characters. Richard alternated between directing his own projects and working with other filmmakers, maintaining a distinct, clown-like persona built on slapstick and blunders. His major box-office successes include The Tall Blond Man with One Black Shoe (1972), Lucky Pierre (1974), La Chèvre (1981), Les Compères (1983) and Les Fugitifs (1986).

Richard remained one of France’s most popular film stars throughout the 1970s and 1980s. Beginning in the 1990s, his career shifted to a lower profile as he moved away from his classic screen persona to explore new types of roles, though he has continued to appear on screen regularly.

== Early life ==
Pierre-Richard Defays was born in a wealthy bourgeois family from Valenciennes. His paternal grandfather, Léopold Defays, was the chairman of the iron and steel company Escaut-et-Meuse. His first name comes from the stage name of Pierre Richard-Willm, who was his mother's favorite actor. His maternal grandfather was an Italian immigrant who had become a successful businessman in France. Richard later described his family as "half-aristocratic, half-immigrant".

Richard's father abandoned his family before his birth, and later went on to squander much of his fortune; they eventually met when Richard was seven years old but, despite seeing each other from time to time, never built a real connection. Richard spent his childhood and a part of his teenage years in his native city where he was a student at the Henri-Wallon high school.

Skipping classes regularly to go to the cinema, it was Danny Kaye in Up in Arms that revealed his vocation. This was received with only a moderate enthusiasm by his family, but he decided nonetheless to go to Paris to study dramatic arts at the famous Charles Dullin school. His beginnings were difficult (he wanted to play straight drama, which was not in his nature) and he studied kinesiotherapy to have a backup plan if needed, but did not renounce acting. He earned his degree as a kinesiotherapist and even briefly opened a practice, though he did not pursue this activity seriously; to reassure his family, he had his acting colleagues Victor Lanoux and Danielle Minazolli pretend to be his patients.

== Career ==
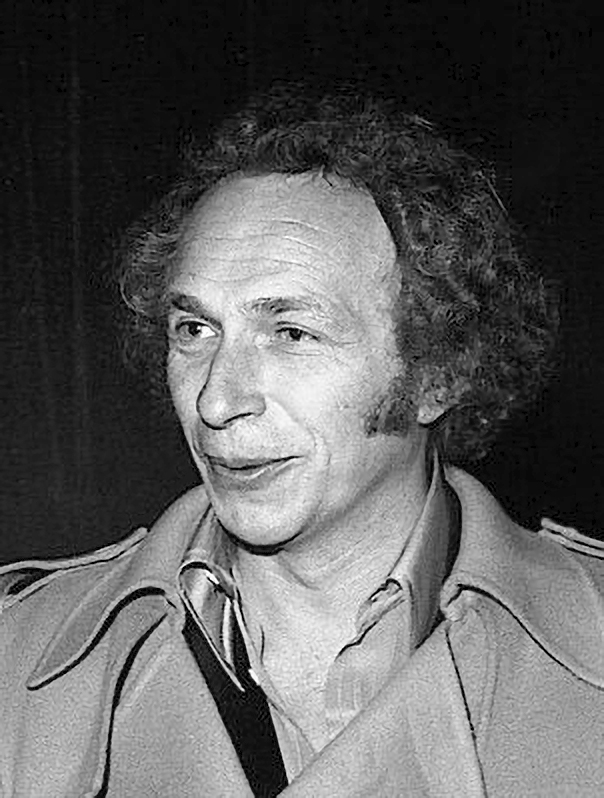
Richard in 1975.

After a short stint as an extra at Jean Vilar's Théâtre National Populaire, Pierre Richard started his career in theatre, under the direction of Antoine Bourseiller. To augment his income, he created a comedy duet with Victor Lanoux; they performed sketches they had written themselves in famous Parisian cabarets and music halls. In 1968, he had his first significant film role in Very Happy Alexander (Alexandre le Bienheureux), directed by Yves Robert. During filming, Robert told him that he was "not an actor, but a character." Initially upset by this remark, Richard was eventually encouraged to make his own films, based on his personal brand of humor.

Richard later showed the script for Le Distrait (The Daydreamer) to Robert, who recommended it to producer Alain Poiré of Gaumont. The film, which Richard directed and starred in, was a surprise success in 1970; it turned Richard into a popular performer in France and enabled him to establish a comedic persona based on slapstick humor, which drew inspiration from directors and performers such as Jacques Tati, Pierre Étaix, Jerry Lewis and Harpo Marx. Richard's persona, which he reproduced in subsequent vehicles, typically combined a lanky, elastic, and highly kinetic style of physical comedy with a generally naive, hapless, and socially mistreated character.

Richard's next film as a director, Les Malheurs d'Alfred (1972), in which he also starred, was equally successful as his first. The same year, his next collaboration with Yves Robert, The Tall Blond Man with One Black Shoe (Le Grand Blond avec une chaussure noire, 1972), was an international box-office hit and cemented Richard's status as France's new comedic superstar. Richard next directed and starred in I Don't Know Much, But I'll Say Everything (Je sais rien, mais je dirai tout, 1973) and starred in a sequel to Robert's film, The Return of the Tall Blond Man with One Black Shoe (1974).

Richard followed up with a series of highly successful comedies, playing on his persona as a klutzy blunderer. In 1974, he co-starred with Jane Birkin in the film Lucky Pierre (La moutarde me monte au nez !), directed by Claude Zidi, which was a box-office hit in France. The next year, Richard and Birkin re-teamed with Zidi for another success, The Wild Goose Chase (La Course à l'échalote). Richard took advantage of his new superstar status to support independent, unconventional projects such as Un nuage entre les dents (1974) and The Castaways of Turtle Island (1976), but these attempts to depart from his usual style were not successful. In his own directorial efforts, Richard sought to convey dissenting ideas, such as criticism of capitalism, militarism, and the mass media.

Pierre Richard was offered the chance to co-star with Louis de Funès, France's, other, older comedy star in Zidi's next film, The Wing or the Thigh, where he would have played de Funès's son. However, Richard ultimately withdrew from the project because he found the script unconvincing; Coluche was eventually cast in the role, and the film went on to be a massive box-office success. Though Richard remained of the opinion that the role was not for him, he later regretted missing the opportunity to partner with de Funès.

Francis Veber, who had written the scripts for The Tall Blond Man with One Black Shoe and its sequel, cast him in the main role in his directorial debut, The Toy (Le Jouet, 1976). The film was eventually remade in 1982 as an American film of the same title, starring Richard Pryor. Richard also partnered with Aldo Maccione in two films, Je suis timide mais je me soigne (1978) and C'est pas moi, c'est lui (1980), both directed by himself. However, feeling unappreciated as a director by critics, Richard later moved away from directing and focused on collaborations with other filmmakers. He worked with director Gérard Oury on two films, La Carapate (1978), which co-starred his old cabaret partner Victor Lanoux, and The Umbrella Coup (1980). He then renewed his partnership with Francis Veber in La Chèvre (1981). This buddy comedy, which paired him with Gérard Depardieu who played the straight man to Richard's fumbling character, was a major international hit; Richard and Depardieu teamed up again under Veber's direction in two equally successful films, Les Compères (1983) and Les Fugitifs (1986). The "trilogy" of Richard and Depardieu's pairings came to be regarded as classics of French mainstream entertainment. All three films received American remakes: Pure Luck (1991), Father's day (1997) and Three Fugitives (1989), respectively.

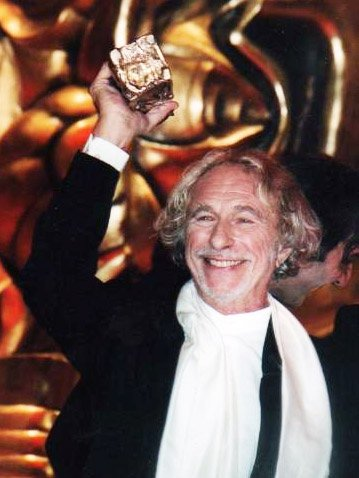
Pierre Richard at the 31st César Awards ceremony in 2006

Richard long-running collaboration with Veber—who served as either screenwriter or director—led him to often play characters of the same name, due to Veber's habit of naming his hapless, bumbling "everyman" protagonists either François Pignon or François Perrin: Richard's character was named François Perrin in The Tall Blond Man with One Black Shoe and its sequel, as well as in On aura tout vu (1976), The Toy and La Chèvre; he was named François Pignon in Les Compères and Les Fugitifs, despite his characters being unconnected. Incidentally, Pierre Richard's characters in other films not involving Veber also shared their first name with him: he was Pierre Durois in Lucky Pierre, Pierre Vidal in The Wild Goose Chase, and Pierre Renaud in Je suis timide mais je me soigne and C'est pas moi, c'est lui, though these roles were likewise unrelated.

At the height of his success, Richard was an international star; he was particularly popular in the Soviet Union, where his films sold a combined total of 261 million admissions.

Richard eventually tried to diversify his image by portraying characters who were less innocent and more cynical, particularly in The Twin (1984). The latter film represented such a change that Richard himself expressed a certain discomfort upon release. Having reached his fifties in the 1980s, Richard sought to reinvent himself further. However, the film Mangeclous (1988), based on Albert Cohen's novel, failed at the French box office. The comedy Door on the Left as You Leave the Elevator, released the same year, did not match the success of his previous films. In 1991, Richard returned to directing with another comedy, On peut toujours rêver, where he co-starred with Smaïn. Throughout the 1990s, he continued his efforts to break type by appearing in more dramatic films, such as La Partie d'échecs co-starring Catherine Deneuve and the Georgian film A Chef in Love (both released in 1996). However, despite the critical respect earned by the latter film, these roles did not enable him to regain his standing at the French box office. In 1997, he directed and starred in the comedy Droit dans le mur, which flopped commercially.

In later years, Richard gravitated toward supporting roles—some purely dramatic (The Serpent, 2006), others echoing his comedic persona (Lost in Paris, 2016). Victor, the Canadian-French co-production A Happy Man (both 2009), Mr. Stein Goes Online (2017) and Mrs. Mills (2018), in which he returned to leading roles, were commercially unsuccessful; however, he also appeared in box-office hits such as La Ch'tite famille, directed by and starring Dany Boon, and Tricky Old Dogs (both 2018). In 2015, he published his memoir, titled Je sais rien, mais je dirai tout (I know nothing, but I will tell everything) after one of his films. In 2023, he appeared in the films Asterix & Obelix: The Middle Kingdom, where he portrayed druid Getafix, and Jeanne du Barry, co-starring Johnny Depp. In 2025, he returned to directing with the film L'Homme qui a vu l'ours qui a vu l'homme

== Other activities ==
Since 1986, Richard has also become a businessman and winemaker. He owns the restaurant Au pied de chameau in Paris and a 50-hectare vineyard which produces some 80,000 bottles a year (red and rosé) labelled as Château Bel Évêque in Gruissan in the department of Aude.

== Personal life ==
Richard's first wife was dancer and actress Danielle Minazzoli, whom he married in 1960 and who appeared with him onscreen several times. The had two sons together, both of whom became actors and musicians. Olivier is a group member of "Blues trottoir" and plays the saxophone and Christophe plays the double bass. In 2019, Christophe succeeded his father as the manager of the family's wine business. Richard and Minazzoli eventually divorced; he was later in a relationship with actress Muriel Dubrulle. In 1996, he remarried to Ceyla Lacerda, a Brazilian businesswoman and former model. His grandson, Arthur Defays, is a model and actor.

Throughout most of his life, Pierre Richard had distinctive curly hair. In 2012, his hair became straight following a minor surgical procedure—a phenomenon that doctors were unable to explain.

== Filmography ==
Richard has acted in all the films he directed.

Year	Title	Role	Director	Note
1958	Montparnasse 19	uncredited	Jacques Becker	
1967	Un idiot à Paris (An Idiot in Paris)	a policeman	Serge Korber	
1968	Alexandre le Bienheureux (Very Happy Alexander)	Colibert	Yves Robert	
1968	La Prisonnière	uncredited	Henri-Georges Clouzot	
1969	La Coqueluche	Pierre	Christian-Paul Arrighi	
1969	Trois Hommes sur un cheval	the painter	Marcel Moussy	
1970	Le Distrait (Absent-minded aka. The Daydreamer)	Pierre Malaquet	Himself	Directorial debut
1972	Les malheurs d'Alfred	Alfred Dhumonttyé	Himself	
1972	Le Grand Blond avec une chaussure noire (The Tall Blond Man with One Black Shoe)	François Perrin	Yves Robert	
1973	La Raison du plus fou	trainee motorcyclist	Raymond Devos and François Reichenbach	
1973	Je sais rien, mais je dirai tout	Pierre Gastié-Leroy	Himself	
1974	Juliette and Juliette	Bob Rozenec	Remo Forlani	
1974	Un nuage entre les dents	Prévot	Marco Pico	
1974	La moutarde me monte au nez (Lucky Pierre)	Pierre Durois	Claude Zidi	
1974	Le Retour du Grand Blond (The Return of the Tall Blond Man with One Black Shoe)	François Perrin	Yves Robert	
1975	Trop c'est trop	a policeman	Didier Kaminka	Cameo
1975	La Course à l'échalote (The Wild Goose Chase)	Pierre Vidal	Claude Zidi	
1976	On aura tout vu	François Perrin	Georges Lautner	
1976	The Castaways of Turtle Island	Jean-Arthur Bonaventure	Jacques Rozier	
1976	Le Jouet (The Toy)	François Perrin	Francis Veber	
1978	Je suis timide mais je me soigne	Pierre Renaud	Himself	
1978	La Carapate	Jean-Philippe Duroc	Gérard Oury	
1980	C'est pas moi, c'est lui	Pierre Renaud	Himself	
1980	Le Coup du parapluie (The Umbrella Coup)	Grégoire Lecomte	Gérard Oury	
1981	La Chèvre (Knock on Wood or The Goat)	François Perrin	Francis Veber	
1983	Un chien dans un jeu de quilles	Pierre Cohen	Bernard Guillou	
1983	Les Compères (ComDads)	François Pignon	Francis Veber	
1984	Le Jumeau (The Twin)	Matthias / Mathieu Duval	Yves Robert	
1985	Tranches de vie	Dubois	François Leterrier	Cameo
1986	Les Fugitifs	François Pignon	Francis Veber	
1987	Parlez-moi du Che	Himself	Himself, with Jean Cormier	Documentary film about Che Guevara
1988	Mangeclous	Mangeclous	Moshé Mizrahi	
1988	À gauche en sortant de l'ascenseur (Door on the Left as You Leave the Elevator)	Yann Ducoudray	Édouard Molinaro	
1990	Promotion canapé	the informant	Didier Kaminka	Cameo
1990	Bienvenue à bord !	the hitchhiker	Jean-Louis Leconte	
1991	On peut toujours rêver	Charles de Boisleve	Himself	
1992	Vieille canaille	Charlie	Gérard Jourd'hui	
1993	La Cavale des fous	Bertrand Daumale	Marco Pico	
1994	La Partie d'échecs	Ambroise	Yves Hanchar	
1995	L'Amour conjugal	Squirrat	Benoît Barbier	
1997	A Chef in Love (Shekvarebuli kulinaris ataserti retsepti)	Pascal Ichak	Nana Dzhordzhadze	
1997	Droit dans le mur	Romain	Himself	
2000	27 Missing Kisses	Captain	Nana Dzhordzhadze	
2003	Mariées mais pas trop (The Very Merry Widows)	Maurice Donnay	Catherine Corsini	
2003	Les Clefs de bagnole (The Car Keys)	Himself	Laurent Baffie	Cameo
2004	En attendant le déluge	Jean-René	Damien Odoul	
2005	Le Cactus	Christian	Gérard Bitton and Michel Munz	
2006	Essaye-moi	Yves-Marie's father	Pierre-François Martin-Laval	
2006	Le Serpent (The Serpent)	Cendras	Éric Barbier	
2008	Faubourg 36	Max	Christophe Barratier	
2008	King Guillaume	William-Fernand	Pierre-François Martin-Laval	
2008	Mia et le Migou (Mia and the Migoo)	Pedro	Jacques-Rémy Girerd	Voice
2009	A Happy Man (Le Bonheur de Pierre)	Pierre Martin	Robert Ménard	
2009	Victor	Victor Corbin	Thomas Gilou	
2009	Kérity, la maison des contes (Eleanor's Secret)	Adrien	Dominique Monféry	Voice
2009	Cinéman		Yann Moix	
2011	All Together	Albert	Stéphane Robelin	
2012	Mes héros	Jean	Éric Besnard	
2016	Lost in Paris	Norman	Dominique Abel and Fiona Gordon	
2017	Mr. Stein Goes Online	Pierre Stein	Stéphane Robelin	
2018	Mrs. Mills	Albert Dupont, a.k.a. Mrs. Scarlett Mills / Mr. Rosenberg / Léonard Chomsky.	Sophie Marceau	
2018	Tricky Old Dogs (Les Vieux Fourneaux)	Pierrot	Christophe Duthuron	
2018	La Ch'tite famille	Jacques Duquenne	Dany Boon	
2021	L'angelo dei muri	Pietro	Lorenzo Bianchini	
2022	Umami	Rufus	Slony Sow	
2022	Pattie and the Wrath of Poseidon	Zeus	David Alaux	Voice
2023	Asterix & Obelix: The Middle Kingdom	Getafix	Guillaume Canet	
2023	Jeanne du Barry	Marshal de Richelieu	Maïwenn	
2023	Two Words as the Key	Michel	Dan Svátek	
2025	L'Homme qui a vu l'ours qui a vu l'homme	Grégoire	Himself	

== Books ==
- Pierre Richard (1989). Olivier Orban (ed.). Le petit blond dans un grand parc.
- Pierre Richard (2003). Cherche-Midi (ed.). Comme un poisson sans eau, détournement de mémoire.
- Pierre Richard; Gwendal Le Bec (2010). Gallimard Jeunesse Giboulées (ed.). Le petit blond avec un mouton blanc. Paris. p. 75. ISBN 978-2-07-062104-0.
- Pierre Richard and Jérémie Imbert, Je sais rien mais je dirai tout (autobiography). Foreword by Gérard Depardieu. Éditions Flammarion, 2015.

== Accolades and honors ==
- Karlovy Vary International Film Festival 1996 : Best Actor for A Chef in Love
- Just for Laughs Festival of Montréal 2004 : Honorary Prize
- 31st César Awards 2006 : Honorary Cesar
- Magritte Awards 2015 (Belgium) : Honorary Prize
- Chevalier (Knight) of the Legion of Honour

== Documentaries ==
- Un jour, un destin : Pierre Richard, l'incompris (A film by Laurent Allen-Caron). Broadcast on France 2 on 6 September 2015 and again on 31 December 2015.
- Pierre Richard, the quiet one directed by Gregory Monro in 2018
