= Elena and Her Men =

1956 film directed by Jean Renoir

- Theatrical release poster
- Directed by: Jean Renoir
- Written by: Jean Renoir; Jean Serge
- Produced by: Louis Wipf
- Starring: Ingrid Bergman; Jean Marais; Mel Ferrer; Jean Richard
- Cinematography: Claude Renoir
- Edited by: Borys Lewin
- Music by: Joseph Kosma
- Production companies: Franco London Films; Les Films Gibé; Electra Compagnia Cinematografica
- Distributed by: Cinédis
- Release dates: 12 September 1956 (France); 31 December 1956 (Italy)
- Running time: 98 minutes
- Countries: France; Italy
- Language: French
- Box office: 2,116,337 admissions (France)

Elena and Her Men (French: Elena et les Hommes; originally released in English-speaking countries as Paris Does Strange Things) is a 1956 film directed by Jean Renoir and starring Ingrid Bergman, Jean Marais, and Mel Ferrer. It was Bergman's first film after leaving her husband, director Roberto Rossellini. Many film critics see the film as the third entry in a trilogy that also includes The Golden Coach (1952) and French Cancan (1955). A restored copy of the film was released in the early 21st century.

== Plot ==
In fin de siècle Paris, Elena Sokorowska, a young, beautiful, and free-spirited Polish princess, thinks that the daisies she gives to her boyfriends help them achieve their ambitions, and, once they do so, she loses interest and looks for another man to help. After dumping a composer who has just learned his opera is to be staged at La Scala, Elena's aunt informs Elena that her family has run out of money, so, in order to save them, she agrees to marry Martin-Michaud, a wealthy, older shoe manufacturer. No sooner has she agreed to this engagement, than she meets the dashing Count Henri de Chevincourt during a Bastille Day celebration. Sparks fly with between Elena and Henri, but when he introduces her to his friend, the famous General François Rollan, the General is quite taken with her as well, even though he is already being pursued by Paulette Escoffier. By the end of the day, Elena finds herself torn between her vow to Martin-Michaud, her feelings for Henri, and her admiration for the General.

To further complicate matters, General Rollan's political advisers see the General's romantic interest in Elena as a way to influence him to attempt to take over the French government, a plan about which he has so far shown ambivalence. Henri is able to convince Elena to help with the plot, and, once promised the General will enact policies favorable to his business, the calculating Martin-Michaud releases her from their engagement. Elena advises the General how to resolve a diplomatic dispute between France and Germany, and, when he succeeds, the General becomes more popular than ever. Thinking her work with the General is done, Elena and Henri go to dinner, but she is confused when he says that his greatest ambition is to do nothing at all.

Worried by rumors of a coup d'état, the French government posts the General to the remote Bourbon-Salins. The day of an election, Elena arrives in the town, and the General, who has been placed under house arrest, escapes to be with her. As word arrives that the General has won the election, the pro-government secret police, as well as a crowd that supports the General, surround the brothel where the General and Elena are hiding. Henri, hoping to win Elena's heart, manages to get inside, and a plan is formulated to help the General get past the police and head to Paris. The General and Henri switch clothes, and Elena and Henri stand in a window while the General, reluctant to leave Elena, escapes unnoticed. He is surprised to find Paulette, who came to Bourbon-Salins with Henri, in the wagon that is supposed to take him to the train station, and he impulsively agrees to abandon his political obligations and go with her to the south of France, instead of Paris. Meanwhile, back at the brothel, Henri suggests that he and Elena act like they are kissing to try to calm the crowd outside, and, at some point, the act becomes real.

== Cast ==
Ingrid Bergman and Mel Ferrer in a promotional photo for the film

- Ingrid Bergman as Princess Elena Sokorowska
- Jean Marais as General François Rollan
- Mel Ferrer as Count Henri de Chevincourt
- Jean Richard as Hector Chagnol, Rollan's orderly
- Juliette Gréco as Miarka, the gypsy singer
- Léo Marjane as the street singer
- Magali Noël as Lolotte, Elena’s lady's maid
- Pierre Bertin as Martin-Michaud, a wealthy shoe manufacturer who is engaged to Elena
- Dora Doll as Rosa "la Rose", the madam of a brothel in Bourbon-Salins
- Frédéric Duvallès as Gaudin, a rubber manufacturer
- Renaud Mary as Fleury, a member of Rollan's political corps ("The Eyes")
- Jacques Morel as Duchene, a member of Rollan's political corps ("The Brain")
- Albert Rémy as Buchez, a member of Rollan's political corps ("The Wit")
- Jean Claudio as Lionel Villaret, a composer
- Mirko Ellis as Marbeau, a Parisian who dislikes Rollan
- Jacques Hilling as Lisbonne, a member of Rollan's political corps ("The Heart")
- Jacques Jouanneau as Eugène Martin-Michaud, who is engaged to Denise, but in love with Lolotte
- Elina Labourdette as Paulette Escoffier, who pursues Rollan
- Olga Valéry as Baroness Olga, Elena's aunt
- Jean Castanier as Isnard, a member of Rollan's political corps
- Gregori Chmara as Gribiche, Elena's butler
- Claire Gérard as a Parisian who comments about how things were in her youth
- Gaston Modot as the artistic director of the traveling gypsy troupe
- Michèle Nadal as Denise Gaudin, who is engaged to, and in love with, Eugène
- Léon Larive as Sylvestre, Henri's valet (uncredited)

== Production ==
The character of General Rollan was based on the historic General Boulanger. In 1886, Boulanger had widespread popular support in France, despite the French defeat in the Franco-Prussian War, and some supporters urged him to conduct a coup d'état, which he did not do.

The film was shot at the Billancourt Studios in Paris. Location shooting took place around the city, including in Saint-Cloud and at the castle of Ermenonville. The sets were designed by the art director Jean André.

== Reception ==
Ingrid Bergman's performance in the film was highly praised. Roger Ebert wrote that, while the plot is about a Polish princess "who may have the future of France in her hands", "The movie is about something else - about Bergman's rare eroticism, and the way her face seems to have an inner light on film. Was there ever a more sensuous actress in the movies? François Truffaut, reviewing this film, observed that 'sex is the only focus of attention.'" Ebert also commented that "Renoir preserves a strong erotic and romantic thread (the love between Bergman and Ferrer) all the way through the movie's farcical elements."

Christopher Faulkner described Elena and Her Men as a farce dealing with many issues and incidents similar to Renoir's 1939 film Rules of the Game. He wrote that it is somewhat "cynical", despite its lightness, as "the point is made that a woman can only find (provisional) power within representation, on a stage, playing a part. At the end of the film, as coup d’état dissolves into coup de théâtre, the suggestion is that all effective power is actually a function of performance."
