= La Carapate =

- Directed by: Gérard Oury
- Written by: Gérard Oury; Danièle Thompson
- Produced by: Alain Poiré
- Starring: Pierre Richard; Victor Lanoux
- Cinematography: Edmond Séchan
- Edited by: Albert Jurgenson
- Music by: Philippe-Gérard
- Distributed by: Gaumont Distribution
- Release date: 11 October 1978 (France)
- Running time: 105 minutes
- Country: France
- Language: French
- Box office: $21.9 million

La Carapate is a 1978 French comedy film directed by Gérard Oury.

== Plot ==
In May 1968, Jean-Philippe Duroc, a lawyer accused of ultra-leftism, visits his client, Martial Gaulard, sentenced to death for a murder he has not committed. At that moment, a mutiny happens inside the prison. Gaulard takes the opportunity and, stealing the clothes of his lawyer, achieves to escape. The police is convinced that Duroc has contributed at the evasion and the two men are wanted by all the police stations of France.

== Cast ==
- Pierre Richard ... Maître Jean-Philippe Duroc, lawyer of Martial Gaulard
- Victor Lanoux ... Martial Gaulard, the accused, fascist and anti-soixante-huitard
- Raymond Bussières ... Marcel Duroc, vieux père de Jean-Philippe
- Jean-Pierre Darras ... Jacques Panivaux, the Bourgeois
- Yvonne Gaudeau ... Gisèle Panivaux, the Bourgeoise
- Jacques Frantz ... Rocheteau
- Claire Richard ... Blanche Hirondelle "Bach Yen", the Vietnamese fiancée of Gaulard
- Blanche Ravalec ... Marguerite
- Claude Brosset ... Gustave
- Bernard Granger ... Jeannot
- Éric Desmaretz ... the judge
- Katia Tchenko ... the prostitute
- Bruno Balp ... Gaston Buteau
- Janine Souchon ... Josette Buteau
- Christian Bouillette ... Dupuis
- Alain Doutey ... the inspector
- Robert Dalban ... the bar owner
- Henri Poirier ... brigadier CRS

== Release ==
The film was released 10 years after the May 1968 events in France.

== Bibliography ==
- Gérard Oury (1988). Orban (ed.). Mémoires d'éléphant. p. 330. ISBN 2855654351. (reprinted by Presses Pocket in 1989, ISBN 2266030639, and by Plon in 1999, ISBN 2259191835)
