= On aura tout vu =

- Directed by: Georges Lautner
- Written by: Francis Veber
- Produced by: Alain Poiré
- Starring: Pierre Richard; Jean-Pierre Marielle; Miou-Miou
- Cinematography: Maurice Fellous
- Edited by: Michelle David
- Music by: Philippe Sarde; Orchestration by Hubert Rostaing
- Production company: Gaumont International
- Distributed by: Gaumont Distribution
- Release date: 16 June 1976
- Running time: 92 minutes
- Country: France
- Language: French

On aura tout vu ('We will have seen all'; an idiom equivalent to English Now we've seen everything) is a French comedy film directed by Georges Lautner and released in 1976. It tells the story of filmmakers with artistic ambitions whose project is turned by their producer into a pornographic film.

== Plot ==
François Perrin (Pierre Richard), a photographer desirous to get into filming, and his friend Henri write a script titled Le miroir de l'âme (The Mirror of the Soul). Having not found any producer, François submits the script to a producer of pornographic films, Bob Morlock (Jean-Pierre Marielle), who retitles the project La vaginale. The only thing is that this setting becomes a source of conflict between François and his partner Christine (Miou-Miou).

== Cast ==
- Pierre Richard: François Perrin, advertising photographer
- Jean-Pierre Marielle: Bob Morlock, producer of pornographic films
- Miou-Miou: Christine Lefèbvre, partner of François
- Gérard Jugnot: Ploumenech, Morlock's assistant
- Henri Guybet: Henri Mercier, pasta maker and co-author with François
- Renée Saint-Cyr: Madame Ferroni, director of the pasta brand "Ferroni"
- Sabine Azéma: Claude Ferroni, the girl in love with Henri
- Jean Luisi: Jules Slimane, the pornographic actor
- Valérie Mairesse: Pierrette, an actress
- Michel Blanc: man at the theater
- Gérard Chambre: Aldo, the pornographic actor
- Jean Michaud: Monsieur Ferroni, director of the pasta brand "Ferroni"
- Maïtena Galli: Mona Duroc, the pornographic actress
- Arlette Emmery: Marie-France, Morlock's secretary
- Marie-Anne Chazel: actress at the theater (uncredited)
- Christian Clavier: actor at the theater
- Thierry Lhermitte: actor at the theater (uncredited)

== Notes on the film ==
- Francis Veber and Georges Lautner have imagined this film at the advent of pornographic films in the United States.
- Engaging himself on the film, Pierre Richard refused at the same time to play in The Wing or the Thigh (1976) in which he was chosen to portray the role of Gérard Duchemin.
- The music theme of the film by Philippe Sarde, is very close to that of the next film directed by Georges Lautner Death of a Corrupt Man (1977), also by Philippe Sarde.
