= Le Distrait =

- Directed by: Pierre Richard
- Written by: Pierre Richard; André Ruellan
- Produced by: Yves Robert; Alain Poiré
- Starring: Pierre Richard; Marie-Christine Barrault; Bernard Blier
- Cinematography: Daniel Vogel
- Edited by: Marie-Josephe Yoyotte
- Music by: Vladimir Cosma
- Production companies: Gaumont; La Guéville; Madeleine Films
- Distributed by: Gaumont Distribution
- Release date: December 1970 (France)
- Running time: 85 min
- Country: France
- Language: French
- Box office: $10,681,620

Le Distrait (English: Absent-minded, alternative English title: The Daydreamer) is a 1970 French comedy film directed by Pierre Richard, starring Pierre Richard, Marie-Christine Barrault and Bernard Blier.

The film combines elements of slapstick, horror and romantic comedy. The plot follows the adventures of Pierre Malaquet, an eccentric and extremely absent-minded advertising manager. The prototype of the character is Ménalque from Jean de La Bruyère's "Caractères".

== Synopsis ==
Pierre Malaquet is a creative, zany and scatterbrained young man who often gets into comic situations. He is hired by a large advertising agency, "Jerico", on his mother's recommendation. Full of bizarre advertising ideas, he meddles in other people's business and tries to remake everything in his own manner. His commercials resemble horror films; themes of death and violence seem to amuse him, and black humor is present in all of his works. He is convinced that "shocking" ads are the most effective. His actions annoy his coworkers, but their boss, Mr. Guiton, forgives him for his tricks because he is secretly involved with Malaquet's mother, Glycia.

At the office Pierre makes friends with Lisa Gastier, Guiton's young and charming secretary. She turns out to be a daughter of one of the most important clients of the agency. Pierre is sent to bring an important contract to his office for signing. As usual, Pierre confuses everything and instead of going to the office he goes to Gastier's house, where there is a party in a full swing. There he becomes a center of attention because of his odd behavior. A younger daughter of Gastier, Veronique, intends to "give him a little lesson", but finds herself in an awkward situation as a result. Mr. Gastier, who waited in vain for Pierre in his office, returns home and when he finds Pierre there, becomes furious and throws him out of the house.

The young wife of Mr. Guiton, Clarisse, tries to seduce Pierre in a greenhouse, but it results in another amusing incident - when Pierre is undressing Clarisse, her long hair gets stuck in her zipper, and to her horror, he cuts off her hair with pruning scissors.

Guiton allocates him in a small office on a ground floor, full of cages with parrots and without proper furniture, in an effort to hold him away from agency business and to spite him. But even here Pierre finds amusement for himself. Soon he gets the first client - a manufacturer of toothpaste "Klerdene", eccentric and even more absent-minded than Pierre himself. While strolling with Lisa he gets an idea of street advertising of the toothpaste. The scenario is the following: a beautiful blonde walks down the street and all of a sudden faints. She gets surrounded by passers-by who start arguing about how to help her. A handsome young man appears and gives her mouth-to-mouth resuscitation. She comes to her senses right away and asks rapturously: "Klerdene?" to which he responds affirmatively, and she says that "it is impossible to forget". Then the advertising slogan is pronounced. Eventually this campaign results in a fight between people for the right to give the woman mouth-to-mouth resuscitation, and in a media scandal.

Pierre's next project was a street advertising of bags for plastic packets, which included smashing eggs on people's heads and also resulted in a large-scale brawl and scandal.

Mr. Guiton still puts up with Pierre's wild escapades, in the minutes of anger soothing himself by remembering romantic moments with Malaquet's mother. But he runs out of patience after the next incident. Pierre makes an even more shocking commercial, believing that it will be a big success, but Lisa, understanding that it oversteps all limits already, convinces him to give it up. However, the videotape with the commercial gets to television by mistake and is broadcast. It stirs up a huge scandal. Enraged TV viewers gather around the agency's building to express protest. Guiton understands that it may ruin agency's reputation. At the extraordinary meeting of the agency's management with the clients he finally decides to fire Malaquet. It upsets Lisa and she goes searching for Pierre. Meanwhile, Pierre, who is attacked by angry marchers on his way to the office, sees a girl in a bath in a big advertising poster. He imagines Lisa on her place and suddenly realizes that he is in love with Lisa. Beside himself in delight, he starts searching around for Lisa, as always getting into funny situations. At this time Lisa arrives at his apartment but doesn't find him there. Eventually Pierre finds her in his apartment taking a bath, and emotionally declares his love to her.

Pierre's mother convinces Guiton to give her son another chance. He decides to send him along with Lisa to work at the agency's office in the US. On board of the plane, right before takeoff, Pierre goes searching for lavatory and somehow gets out of the plane, which takes off without him. Confused Pierre runs after the plane, a narrator recites the passage from "Caractères" by Jean de La Bruyère, and the film ends.

== Soundtrack ==
- Le distrait (2:07)
- Récéption chez les Gastier (3:44)
- Étourderies (0:51)
- Promenade dans les champs (2:02)
- Bravo Plistax (1:03)
- Pierre et Lisa (1:38)
- Bizarre, tout est normal (2:31)
- Gazou, gazou (1:10)
- Le distrait - final (1:50)

== Cast ==
- Pierre Richard — Pierre Malaquet
- Marie-Christine Barrault — Lisa Gastier
- Bernard Blier — Alexandre Guiton
- Maria Pacôme — Glycia Malaquet
- Catherine Samie — Clarisse Guiton
- Micheline Luccioni — Mme Gastier
- Tsilla Chelton — Madame Cliston
- Paul Préboist — Mr. Klerdène
- Robert Dalban — Mazelin
- Romain Bouteille — Corbel
- Claude Evrard — Figuier
- Jacques Monod — Mr. Malaquet
- François Maistre — Mr. Gastier
- Anne-Marie Blot — Véronique Gastier
- Blanche Brondy — the woman who falls
- Fanny Gaillard — France
- Robert Renaudin — The Plistax representative
- Yves Robert — Pierre's neighbor
- Luis Rego

== Release history ==
Country	Release date
France	December 1970
Finland	18 August 1972
West Germany	August 1974
