= Henri Decaë =

French cinematographer (1915–1987)

- Born: 31 July 1915; Saint-Denis, France
- Died: 7 March 1987 (aged 71); Paris, France
- Occupation: Cinematographer
- Years active: 1949–1987

Henri Decaë (31 July 1915 – 7 March 1987) was a French cinematographer who entered the film industry as a sound engineer and sound editor. He was a photojournalist in the French army during World War II. After the war he began making documentary shorts, directing and photographing industrial and commercial films. In 1947 he made his first feature film.

Decaë is strongly associated with directors who strongly influenced, or were part of, the French New Wave. These include Jean-Pierre Melville, Louis Malle and Claude Chabrol. Decaë first worked as a cinematographer with Melville on Le Silence de la Mer (1949). Decaë also edited and mixed the sound. Although Decaë worked with Melville on Les enfants terribles, which as Williams commented (1992, p333) "...the work is more accurately to be viewed as a stunning demonstration of the cinematic possibilities of faithful literary adaptation in the hands of a gifted director", according to Marie (p 88) it was his distinctive camera work on Bob le flambeur which caught the attention of the Cahiers critics. Malle hired him for his first two features and Chabrol for his first three features. They had been lucky as Decaë was finding it hard to get work at that time as he was being informally shunned by many after participating in a critical film about the Korean War. By the time Decaë worked for François Truffaut on The 400 Blows he came with a reputation, which meant that he was the highest-paid person on the film.

Decaë's liking for natural light, his ability to work at speed as well as his excellent photographic sensibility led to him working with René Clément on several features beginning with Plein soleil (1960). It was Decaë "...who liberated the camera, from its fixed tripod. He made the New Wave possible, backing up Melville, Malle, Chabrol and Truffaut." (Marie, 2003 p 89)

For bibliographical references see bibliography under Cinema of France.

== Selected filmography ==
- Le Silence de la mer (1949), directed by Jean-Pierre Melville
- Les Enfants terribles (1950), directed by Jean-Pierre Melville
- Bernard and the Lion (1951)
- Heart of the Casbah (1952)
- Bob le flambeur (1955), directed by Jean-Pierre Melville
- Les Amants (1958), directed by Louis Malle
- Le Beau Serge (1958), directed by Claude Chabrol
- Ascenseur pour l'échafaud (1958), directed by Louis Malle
- Les Quatre cents coups (1959), directed by François Truffaut
- Les Cousins (1959), directed by Claude Chabrol
- Witness in the City (1959), directed by Édouard Molinaro
- À double tour (1959), directed by Claude Chabrol (his third feature, released in December)
- Che gioia vivere (1960), directed by René Clément (a comedy)
- Plein Soleil (1960), directed by René Clément (Suspense thriller)
- Les Bonnes Femmes (1960), directed by Claude Chabrol (his fourth feature, released in April; critical and box office reception unfavourable - a flop)
- Léon Morin, prêtre (1961), directed by Jean-Pierre Melville
- Vie privée (1962), directed by Louis Malle
- Eva (1962) (uncredited), directed by Joseph Losey
- Les dimanches de Ville d'Avray (1962), directed by Serge Bourguignon
- Les Sept péchés capitaux (1962), directed by Philippe de Broca / Claude Chabrol. This is a blend of the commercial work of 'Cinéma de papa' directors and representatives of the New Wave including Jean-Luc Godard, Chabrol, Jacques Demy and Roger Vadim. Anger is the first sin to be treated by Sylvain Dhomme. Molinaro makes a version of Envy. Philippe de Broca makes Gluttony. Jacques Demy is next with Lust. Godard tackles Sloth with Eddie Constantine playing a loafer for a change, not his Lemmy Caution-like nerveless violence. Pride comes from Roger Vadim; Chabrol is last with Greed.
- Le Jour et l'heure (1963), directed by René Clément. (Action / Drama / War)
- L’Aîné des Ferchaux (1963), directed by Jean-Pierre Melville : Stars Jean-Paul Belmondo.
- The Bread Peddler (1963)
- Dragées au poivre (1963), directed by Jacques Baratier, but stars Belmondo, Monica Vitti, Anna Karina and Roger Vadim–these last in small parts.
- Les Félins (1964), directed by René Clément, stars Alain Delon and Jane Fonda. B & W. Thriller
- La Ronde (1964), directed by Roger Vadim (not to be confused with the Max Ophüls version of 1950). Starred famous New Wave actress Anna Karina as well as Jane Fonda.
- The Black Tulip (1964)
- Viva Maria! 1965), directed by Louis Malle, stars Brigitte Bardot, Jeanne Moreau. Genre: Adventure / Comedy / Western.
- The Thief of Paris (Le voleur) (1967), directed by Louis Malle, stars Jean-Paul Belmondo.
- Le Samouraï (1967), directed by Jean-Pierre Melville, stars Alain Delon.
- The Sicilian Clan (1969), directed by Henri Verneuil and starring Alain Delon
- Two People (1973), directed by Robert Wise, stars Peter Fonda and Lindsay Wagner
- Operation Daybreak (1975), directed by Lewis Gilbert, stars Timothy Bottoms, Anthony Andrews, Martin Shaw and Joss Ackland
- Seven Nights in Japan (1976), directed by Lewis Gilbert, stars Michael York and James Villiers
- Bobby Deerfield (1977), directed by Sydney Pollack, stars Al Pacino and Marthe Keller
- The Boys from Brazil (1978), directed by Franklin J. Schaffner, stars Laurence Olivier, Gregory Peck and James Mason
- An Almost Perfect Affair (1979), directed by Michael Ritchie, stars Keith Carradine, Monica Vitti and Raf Vallone
- The Hard Way (1980), directed by Michael Dryhurst, stars Patrick McGoohan and Lee Van Cleef
- The Island (1980), directed by Michael Ritchie, stars Michael Caine, David Warner and Frank Middlemass
- Exposed (1983), directed by James Toback, stars Nastassja Kinski, Rudolf Nureyev, and Harvey Keitel
- La vengeance du serpent à plumes (1984), directed by Gérard Oury, stars Coluche and Josiane Balasko
