= Manu Pluton =

French former bodybuilder, film actor, and pornographic actor

- Born: January 7, 1942 (age 84); Fort-de-France, Martinique
- Occupations: Bodybuilder, actor
- Years active: 1971–1984

Emmanuel "Manu" Pluton is a French former competitive bodybuilder and film actor. During the 1970s he also performed as a pornographic actor.

== Bodybuilding career ==
Pluton's most successful year in bodybuilding was 1965 when he won the contests of Mr. France (tall category and overall) and Europe Mr. Apollo (tall category and overall). He also participated in NABBA Amateur Mr. Universe the same year, with the 6th place in the Tall category.

== Mainstream film career ==
In 1971, Pluton started appearing in films, starting with Jacques Scandelari's Beyond Love and Evil. Various minor roles followed, including a bit part in French Connection II.

== Pornographic film career ==
In 1975, Pluton was cast in Serge Korber's pornographic films Love Play (L'Essayeuse) and Growing Up (Dans la chaleur de Julie). Pluton continued performing in French pornographic films, particularly in those directed by Korber, until 1977. His scene in Éric de Winter's sadomasochistic and controversial film Maléfices pornos, which was produced in 1976 but could only be screened by 1978, was deemed "racist" by the censorship board.

== In the United States ==
Pluton moved to the United States in the early 1980s. He became the NABBA Southern California Chairman and won the Masters National Championship in 1982.
