= Édouard Molinaro =

French film director and screenwriter (1928–2013)

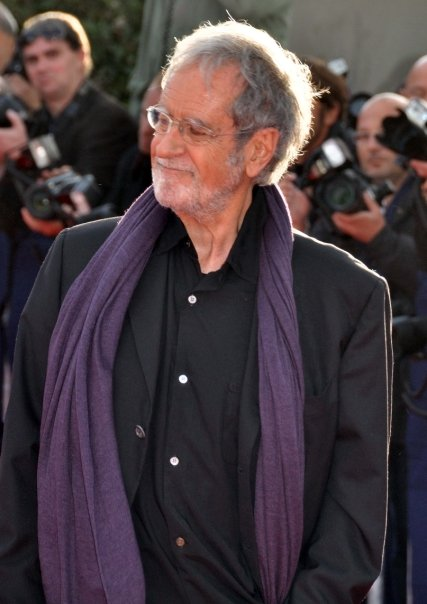
- Molinaro in 2009
- Born: 13 May 1928; Bordeaux, France
- Died: 7 December 2013 (aged 85); Paris, France
- Occupations: Film director; screenwriter
- Years active: 1946–2013
- Known for: La Cage aux Folles

Édouard Molinaro (13 May 1928 – 7 December 2013) was a French film director and screenwriter.

== Biography ==
He was born in Bordeaux, Gironde. He is best known for his comedies with Louis de Funès (Oscar, Hibernatus), My Uncle Benjamin (with Jacques Brel and Claude Jade), Dracula and Son (with Christopher Lee), and the Academy Award-nominated La Cage aux Folles (with Michel Serrault and Ugo Tognazzi). Molinaro was active as a director until a few years before his death, although after 1985 he had almost exclusively been producing works for television.

In 1996, his cinematic work was awarded the René Clair Award, a prize given by the Académie Française for excellent film work.

Molinaro died of a respiratory insufficiency in 2013 at the age of 85.

== Filmography (as director) ==
- Les Alchimistes (1957, short)
- Back to the Wall (1958) — based on a novel by Frédéric Dard
- The Road to Shame (1959) — based on a novel by Gilles-Maurice Dumoulin
- Witness in the City (1959) — screenplay by Boileau-Narcejac
- A Mistress for the Summer (1960) — based on a novel by Maurice Clavel
- The Passion of Slow Fire (1961) — based on a novel by Georges Simenon
- Les Ennemis (Touch of Treason, 1962) — based on a novel by Fred Noro
- The Seven Deadly Sins (1962, anthology film)
- Arsène Lupin Versus Arsène Lupin (1962) — Arsène Lupin sequel
- Une ravissante idiote (Agent 38-24-36, The Ravishing Idiot, 1964) — based on a novel by Charles Exbrayat
- Male Hunt (1964)
- When the Pheasants Pass (1965)
- To Commit a Murder (1967) — based on a novel by Jacques Robert
- Oscar (1967) — based on a play by Claude Magnier
- Hibernatus (1969) — based on a play by Jean Bernard-Luc
- My Uncle Benjamin (1969) — based on a novel by Claude Tillier
- La Liberté en croupe (1970) — based on a novel by Jacques Perry
- The Most Gentle Confessions (1971)) — based on a play by Georges Arnaud
- Sweet Deception (1972) — based on a novel by Christine de Rivoyre
- The Hostage Gang (1973)
- L'Emmerdeur (A Pain in the A..., 1973) — screenplay by Francis Veber
- The Irony of Chance (1974) — based on a novel by Paul Guimard
- Histoires insolites: Un jour comme les autres avec des cacahuètes (1974, TV series episode)
- Le Téléphone rose (The Pink Telephone, 1975) — screenplay by Francis Veber
- Dracula and Son (1976) — Dracula parody
- Man in a Hurry (1977) — based on the novel The Man in a Hurry by Paul Morand
- Madame le juge: Le Dossier Françoise Muller (1978, TV series episode)
- Claudine (1978, TV miniseries) — based on the Claudine novels by Colette
- La Cage aux folles (1978) — screenplay by Francis Veber, based on the play La Cage aux Folles by Jean Poiret
- Il était un musicien: Monsieur Strauss (1979, TV series episode)
- Cause toujours... tu m'intéresses! (1979) — screenplay by Francis Veber, based on a novel by Peter Marks
- La Pitié dangereuse (1979, TV film) — based on Beware of Pity by Stefan Zweig
- Sunday Lovers (1980, anthology film) — screenplay by Francis Veber
- La Cage aux Folles II (1980) — screenplay by Francis Veber, sequel to La Cage aux Folles
- Au bon beurre (1981, TV film) — based on The Best Butter by Jean Dutourd
- Pour cent briques, t'as plus rien... (For 200 Grand, You Get Nothing Now, 1982) — based on a play by Didier Kaminka
- La Veuve rouge (1983, TV film) — based on a novel by Armand Lanoux
- Just the Way You Are (1984)
- Palace (1985)
- L'Amour en douce (Love on the Quiet, 1985)
- Le Tiroir secret (1986, TV miniseries)
- Un métier du seigneur (TV film) — based on A Noble Profession by Pierre Boulle
- L'Ivresse de la métamorphose (1988, TV miniseries) — based on The Post Office Girl by Stefan Zweig
- Door on the Left as You Leave the Elevator (1988) — based on a play by Gérard Lauzier
- La Ruelle au clair de lune (1988, TV film) — based on Moonbeam Alley by Stefan Zweig
- Manon Roland (1989, TV film) — biographical film about Madame Roland
- Les Grandes Familles (1989, TV miniseries) — based on a novel by Maurice Druon
- Le Gorille: La Peau du gorille (1990, TV series episode)
- L'Amour maudit de Leisenbohg (1991, TV film) — based on a novella by Arthur Schnitzler
- Coup de foudre: Résurgence (1992, TV series episode)
- Coup de foudre: Grand, beau et brun (1992, TV series episode)
- La Femme abandonnée (1992, TV film) — based on The Deserted Woman by Honoré de Balzac
- The Supper (1992) — based on a play by Jean-Claude Brisville
- Ce que savait Maisie (1995, TV film) — based on What Maisie Knew by Henry James
- Beaumarchais (1996) — biographical film about Beaumarchais, based on a play by Sacha Guitry
- H (1998–1999, TV series, 14 episodes)
- Nora (1999, TV film) — based on Watch and Ward by Henry James
- Tombé du nid (1999, TV film)
- Nana (2001, TV film) — loosely based on Nana by Émile Zola
- Un homme par hasard (2003, TV film)
- Navarro: Double meurtre (2005, TV series episode)
- Une famille pas comme les autres (2005, TV film)
- Les Hommes de cœur (2005–2006, TV series, 3 episodes)
- Navarro: Manipulation (2005, TV series episode)
- Le Tuteur (2005–2008, TV series, 5 episodes)
- Dirty Slapping (2008, TV short film)
