= Life and Nothing But =

- Theatrical release poster
- Directed by: Bertrand Tavernier
- Written by: Jean Cosmos; Bertrand Tavernier
- Based on: The General of the Dead Army by Ismail Kadare
- Produced by: Frédéric Bourboulon; Albert Prévost; René Cleitman
- Cinematography: Bruno de Keyzer
- Edited by: Armand Psenny
- Music by: Oswald d'Andréa
- Distributed by: UGC Distribution
- Release date: 6 September 1989
- Running time: 135 minutes
- Country: France
- Language: French
- Box office: $11.3 million

Life and Nothing But (French: La vie et rien d'autre) is a 1989 French film directed by Bertrand Tavernier. It was inspired by the novel by Albanian writer Ismail Kadare titled The General of the Dead Army.

== Synopsis ==
Set in October 1920, it tells the story of Major Delaplane, a man whose job is to find the identities of unknown dead soldiers after World War I. He encounters two women looking for their lost men: Irène, an aristocrat, and Alice, a country girl. The movie is a sensitive examination of the deep psychological scars left behind by the war, clear of sentiment yet with delicately nuanced irony.

== Cast ==
- Philippe Noiret - Commandant Delaplane
- Sabine Azéma - Irène de Courtil
- Pascale Vignal - Alice
- Maurice Barrier - Mercadot
- François Perrot - Capitaine Perrin
- Jean-Pol Dubois - André
- Frédéric Pierrot - Marcel
- Jean-Paul Comart - Fagot
- Daniel Russo - Lieutenant Trévise
- Michel Duchaussoy - Général Villerieux
- Pascal Elso - The blind

== Production ==
Principal Photography began on 1 November 1988.

Filming took place in Haute-Marne and Meuse, including in Verdun. The final scene was filmed near Noiret's property in Montréal, Aude.

== Awards ==
The film was nominated for numerous awards. It won the BAFTA Award for Best Film Not in the English Language. It was also nominated for 11 César Awards, winning for Best Actor (Philippe Noiret) and Best Music.

== Other films based on the book ==
- The General of the Dead Army (Italian: Il generale dell'armata morta) is a 1983 Italian film starring Michel Piccoli, based on the novel, directed by Luciano Tovoli.
- The Return of the Dead Army (Albanian: Kthimi i Ushtrise se Vdekur) is a 1989 Albanian film starring Bujar Lako, based on the novel, directed by Dhimitër Anagnosti.
