= The Return of the Dead Army =

- Directed by: Dhimitër Anagnosti
- Written by: Dhimitër Anagnosti
- Based on: The General of the Dead Army by Ismail Kadare
- Starring: Kastriot Ahmetaj; Roza Anagnosti; Rajmonda Bullku; Vasillaq Godo; Bujar Lako
- Cinematography: Bardhyl Martiniani
- Edited by: Mimoza Nano
- Music by: Gjon Simoni
- Distributed by: Albafilm
- Release date: 1989
- Running time: 104 minutes
- Country: Albania
- Language: Albanian

The Return of the Dead Army (Albanian: Kthimi i ushtrisë së vdekur) is a 1989 Albanian film, written and directed by Dhimitër Anagnosti and based on the acclaimed novel The General of the Dead Army by Albanian author Ismail Kadare.

== Plot ==
At the end of World War II in Europe, an Italian general and a priest companion go to Albania to search for the remains of a colonel who died during the war in mysterious circumstances.

== Cast ==
- Kastriot Ahmetaj
- Roza Anagnosti
- Rajmonda Bullku
- Vasillaq Godo
- Bujar Lako
- Gulielm Radoja
- Liza Vorfi
- Ndriçim Xhepa

== Other films based on the book ==
- The General of the Dead Army (Italian: Il generale dell'armata morta) is a 1983 Italian film starring Michel Piccoli, based on the novel, directed by Luciano Tovoli.
- Life and Nothing But (La Vie et rien d’autre) is a 1989 French film starring Philippe Noiret, based on the novel, directed by Bertrand Tavernier.
