= The General of the Dead Army =

The General of the Dead Army may refer to:

- The General of the Dead Army (novel), a 1963 novel by Ismail Kadare
- The General of the Dead Army (film), a 1983 film directed by Luciano Tovoli
