= Cercato =

Cercato is a family name of Italian origin. It may refer to:

- Aba Cercato (born 1939), Italian television presenter and announcer
- Flavia Cercato (born 1971), Italian television presenter
- Paolo Cercato (2005–1930), Italian Architect
- Simone Cercato (born 1975), Italian freestyle swimmer
