= Bordo =

Bordo may refer to

== People ==
- Michael D. Bordo, professor of economic history at Rutgers University
- Susan Bordo, modern feminist philosopher
- Borivoj Dovnikovic-Bordo, Croatian animator who created the 1968 film Krek

== Wine grapes ==
- Cabernet Franc, known as Bordo grape in Italy
- Chasselas, known as Bordo in various wine regions
- Ives noir, known as Bordô in Brazil

== Other ==
- Bordo Bereliler - an elite armed force of officers in the Turkish Army
- Bordo Dates, an American dates company
- An Italian village belonging to the Comune of Borgomezzavalle Verbano-Cusio-Ossola
- The French place and wine Bordeaux is pronounced like Bordo

== See also ==
- El Bordo (disambiguation)
- Bordos, a village in Fântânele, Mureș, Romania
- Los Bordos (Mexicable), an aerial station in Ecatepec, Mexico
