= The General of the Dead Army (novel) =

1963 novel by Ismail Kadare

- First English-language edition
- Author: Ismail Kadare
- Original title: Gjenerali i Ushtrisë së vdekur
- Translator: Derek Coltman
- Language: Albanian
- Genre: History
- Set in: Albania, 1960s
- Publisher: Sh.B. Naim Frashëri; W. H. Allen
- Publication date: 1963
- Publication place: PR Albania
- English publication date: 1971
- Pages: 264
- ISBN: 9780099518266
- OCLC: 7277030
- Dewey Decimal: 891.9913
- LC Class: PG9621.K3 G513
- Followed by: The Siege

The General of the Dead Army (Albanian: Gjenerali i ushtrisë së vdekur) is a 1963 novel by then 26-year-old Albanian writer Ismail Kadare and his most critically acclaimed. He was encouraged to write it by Drago Siliqi, literary critic and director of the state-owned publishing house Naim Frashëri.

== Plot ==
In the early 1960s, nearly 20 years after the end of the Second World War, an Italian general, accompanied by a priest who is also an Italian army colonel, is sent to Albania to locate and collect the remains of his countrymen who had died during the war and return them for burial in Italy. As they organise digs and disinterment, they wonder at the scale of their task. The general talks to the priest about the futility of war and the meaninglessness of the enterprise. As they go deeper into the Albanian countryside they find they are being followed by another general who is looking for the bodies of German soldiers killed in World War II. Like his Italian counterpart, the German struggles with a thankless job looking for remains to take back home for burial, and questions the value of such attempts at national face saving.

== Reception ==
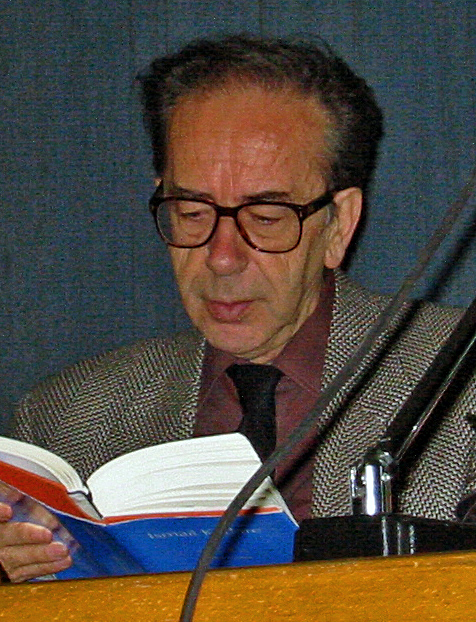
Ismail Kadare

The novel was initially criticized by Albanian official literary critics and then ignored because Kadare had avoided the style of Socialist Realism and intentionally ignored the Communist Party. Kadare's novel was in stark contrast to other writers of that time who glorified the communist revolution. Apart from that, while the poets and novelists of that time used to write about the ideological sun that warmed all communists, in this novel, Kadare, as in his other novels, removed neither the clouds nor the rain from the Albanian countryside.

The novel has received many positive reviews. Richard Eder of The New York Times stated that "Kadare advances wryly and dryly into the darkness... [he] doesn't do messages; he brings them to lethal life". The Boston Globe called it "a powerful and poignant Albanian novel". Alan Brownjohn of The Times Literary Supplement praised the novel, calling it "a profoundly moving novel... rich in poignant details". It was listed on Le Monde's 100 Books of the Century.

Though it is his best-known novel, Kadare viewed it as good literature but not his best work.

=== Translations ===
It was first translated in Bulgarian by Marina Marinova, published in 1966. After that, it was translated in Serbo-Croatian by Esad Mekuli and published in 1968. Then it was translated in Turkish by Attila Tokatlı and Necdet Sander and published in 1970 from Sander editions in Istanbul.

The English translation by Derek Coltman, first published by W. H. Allen, was made not directly from the Albanian, but from the 1970 French edition published by Albin Michel. A revised English edition was published by The Harvill Press in 2000, in light of the revised French edition published by Fayard in 1998, and was reprinted by Vintage Press in 2008.

== Adaptations ==
The novel inspired three films: Luciano Tovoli's The General of the Dead Army starring Michel Piccoli and Marcello Mastroianni as the Italian General, Dhimitër Anagnosti's The Return of the Dead Army (Albanian: Kthimi i Ushtrise se Vdekur) - a 1989 Albanian film starring Bujar Lako, and Bertrand Tavernier’s Life and Nothing But (La Vie et rien d’autre) starring Philippe Noiret.

=== Films ===
- General of the Dead Army is a 1975 Albanian film starring Sander Prosi, Violeta Manushi.
- The General of the Dead Army (Italian: Il generale dell'armata morta) is a 1983 Italian film starring Michel Piccoli, based on the novel, directed by Luciano Tovoli.
- The Return of the Dead Army (Albanian: Kthimi i Ushtrise se Vdekur) is a 1989 Albanian film starring Bujar Lako, based on the novel, directed by Dhimitër Anagnosti.
- Life and Nothing But (La Vie et rien d’autre) is a 1989 French film starring Philippe Noiret, based on the novel, directed by Bertrand Tavernier.

=== Theater ===
The book has been adapted for the stage and is a commonly performed play in Albanian theaters and in some neighboring countries.

== See also ==
- Albanian literature
- Le Monde's 100 Books of the Century
