= Fogar =

Fogar is a surname. Notable people with this surname include:

- Ambrogio Fogar (1941–2005), Italian sailor and writer
- Aulus Fogar (born 1925), Italian footballer
- Francesca Fogar (born 1975), Italian journalist and television host
- Giorgio Fogar (born 1939), Italian footballer
- Galliano Fogar (1921–2011), Italian art historian
- Luigi Fogar (1882–1971), Italian Catholic archbishop
