= Ray Lovejoy =

British film editor

- Born: 18 February 1939; United Kingdom
- Died: 18 October 2001 (aged 62); United Kingdom
- Occupation: Film editor

Ray Lovejoy (18 February 1939 – 18 October 2001) was a British film editor with about thirty editing credits.

== Career ==
He had a notable collaboration with director Peter Yates that extended over six films including The Dresser (1983), which was nominated for numerous BAFTA Awards and Academy Awards.

Lovejoy was an assistant to editor Anne V. Coates for films from The Horse's Mouth (1958) to Lawrence of Arabia (1962). He was next an assistant to editor Anthony Harvey on Dr. Strangelove (1964), which was produced and directed by Stanley Kubrick. Harvey subsequently became a director himself, and Kubrick promoted Lovejoy to be the editor for his subsequent film 2001: A Space Odyssey (1968). Kubrick and Lovejoy next worked together on The Shining (1980); Kubrick worked with other editors for his two films from the 1970s.

Stephen Prince described Lovejoy's contributions to 1980s films as follows, "Ray Lovejoy cut Stanley Kubrick's 2001: A Space Odyssey (1968), and he worked again with Kubrick on The Shining and supplied that film with an entirely different--tenser, more foreboding--texture than the stately science-fiction film possesses. Lovejoy also proved adept at editing for blockbuster effect. His cutting in Aliens sustained that sequel's narrative momentum with a speed and tension that its predecessor did not have, and his editing on Batman finessed that film's gaping narrative problems by simply rushing past them."

In 1987, he was nominated for the Academy Award for Best Film Editing for his work on the film Aliens (1986). In 2012, the Motion Picture Editors Guild published a list of the 75 best-edited films of all time based on a survey of its members. Two films edited by Lovejoy are on this listing. 2001: A Space Odyssey was listed nineteenth, and The Shining was listed as forty-fourth.

== Death ==
Lovejoy died of a heart attack on 18 October 2001.

== Filmography ==
This filmography is based on the Internet Movie Database.

Editor
Year	Film	Director	Notes
1968	2001: A Space Odyssey	Stanley Kubrick	Second collaboration with Stanley Kubrick
1972	The Ruling Class	Peter Medak	First collaboration with Peter Medak
1972	A Day in the Death of Joe Egg	Peter Medak	Second collaboration with Peter Medak
1972	Fear Is the Key	Michael Tuchner	
1974	Little Malcolm	Stuart Cooper	
1974	Ghost in the Noonday Sun	Peter Medak	Third collaboration with Peter Medak
1975	Never Too Young to Rock	Dennis Abey	
1975	Side by Side	Bruce Beresford	
1980	The Shining	Stanley Kubrick	Third collaboration with Stanley Kubrick
1983	Krull	Peter Yates	First collaboration with Peter Yates
1983	The Dresser	Peter Yates	Second collaboration with Peter Yates
1984	Sheena	John Guillermin	
1985	Eleni	Peter Yates	Third collaboration with Peter Yates
1986	Aliens	James Cameron	
1987	Suspect	Peter Yates	Fourth collaboration with Peter Yates
1988	The House on Carroll Street	Peter Yates	Fifth collaboration with Peter Yates
1988	Homeboy	Michael Seresin	
1989	Batman	Tim Burton	
1990	Mister Frost	Philippe Setbon	
1991	Let Him Have It	Peter Medak	Fourth collaboration with Peter Medak
1992	Year of the Comet	Peter Yates	Sixth collaboration with Peter Yates
1993	A Far Off Place	Mikael Salomon	
1994	Monkey Trouble	Franco Amurri	
1995	Rainbow	Bob Hoskins	
1996	The Last of the High Kings	David Keating	
1997	Inventing the Abbotts	Pat O'Connor	
1998	Lost in Space	Stephen Hopkins	
1999	Running Free	Sergei Bodrov	First collaboration with Sergei Bodrov
2001	The Quickie	Sergei Bodrov	Second collaboration with Sergei Bodrov
2002	Vacuums	Luke Cresswell; Steve McNicholas	

Editorial department
Year	Film	Director	Role	Notes
1957	Time Lock	Gerald Thomas	Second assistant editor	Uncredited
1958	The Horse's Mouth	Ronald Neame	Assistant editor	Uncredited
1960	Tunes of Glory	Ronald Neame	Assistant editor	Uncredited
1961	Don't Bother to Knock	Cyril Frankel	Assistant editor	Uncredited
1962	Lawrence of Arabia	David Lean	Assistant editor	Uncredited
1964	Dr. Strangelove	Stanley Kubrick	Assistant editor	First collaboration with Stanley Kubrick
1965	The Spy Who Came In from the Cold	Martin Ritt	Assistant editor	Uncredited

Documentaries

Director
Year	Film
1976	Radio 1 on the Road

Producer
Year	Film	Director	Credit
1976	Radio 1 on the Road	Himself	Producer

TV series

Editor
Year	Title	Notes
1977	Space: 1999	1 episode
1996	Kindred: The Embraced	1 episode

== See also ==
- List of film director and editor collaborations
