= 18th Berlin International Film Festival =

1968 film festival in West Berlin, Germany

- 18th Berlin International Film Festival Logo
- Location: West Berlin, Germany
- Founded: 1951
- Awards: Golden Bear: Who Saw Him Die?
- Festival date: 21 June – 2 July 1968
- Website: Website

Berlin International Film Festival chronology
- 19th 17th

The 18th annual Berlin International Film Festival was held from 21 June to 2 July 1968.

The Golden Bear was awarded to Who Saw Him Die? directed by Jan Troell.

== Jury ==
The following people were announced as being on the jury for the festival:

- Luis García Berlanga, Spanish filmmaker - Jury President
- Peter Schamoni, West-German filmmaker, producer and actor
- Alex Viany, Brazilian filmmaker and journalist
- Georges de Beauregard, French producer
- Alexander Walker, British film critic
- Domenico Meccoli, Italian screenwriter and film critic
- Carl-Eric Nordberg, Swedish literary and film critic
- Gordon Hitchens, British film critic
- Karsten Peters, West-German actor and film critic

== Official Sections ==
=== Main Competition ===
The following films were in competition for the Golden Bear award:

English title	Original title	Director(s)	Production Country
Asta Nielsen		Asta Nielsen	Denmark
Bandits in Milan	Banditi a Milano	Carlo Lizzani	Italy
Les Biches		Claude Chabrol	France, Italy
Challenge in the Snow	13 jours en France	Claude Lelouch and François Reichenbach	France
Charly		Ralph Nelson	USA
The Chronicle of Anna Magdalena Bach	Chronik der Anna Magdalena Bach	Jean-Marie Straub and Danièle Huillet	West Germany, Italy
The Day of the Owl	Il giorno della civetta	Damiano Damiani	Italy, France
The Ernie Game		Don Owen	Canada
Hunger for Love	Fome de Amor	Nelson Pereira dos Santos	Brazil
Gates to Paradise		Andrzej Wajda	United Kingdom, Yugoslavia
The Immortal Story		Orson Welles	France
India '67	An Indian Day	S. Sukhdev	India
Innocence Unprotected	Nevinost bez zastite	Dušan Makavejev	Yugoslavia
Krek	Крек	Borivoj Dovnikovic-Bordo	Yugoslavia
The Man Who Lies	L'Homme qui ment	Alain Robbe-Grillet	France, Czechoslovakia
Nanami, The Inferno of First Love	初恋・地獄篇	Susumu Hani	Japan
Peppermint Frappé		Carlos Saura	Spain
Portrait: Orson Welles		François Reichenbach and Frédéric Rossif	France
Signs of Life	Lebenszeichen	Werner Herzog	West Germany
Something Like Love	Come l'amore	Enzo Muzii	Italy
Toets		Tim Tholen	Netherlands
To Grab the Ring	To Grab the Ring: Enkele reis voor Alfred	Nikolai van der Heyde	Netherlands
Tolerance	Tolerancija	Zlatko Grgić and Branko Ranitović	Yugoslavia
U raskoraku		Milenko Štrbac	Yugoslavia
Weekend	Week-end	Jean-Luc Godard	France
Who Saw Him Die?	Ole dole doff	Jan Troell	Sweden

=== Young Canadian Film ===
A non-competitive program highlighting recent films by new and emerging Canadian film directors.

English title	Original title	Director(s)
A Great Big Thing (1968)		Eric Till
A Place to Stand (1967)		Christopher Chapman
Between Salt and Sweet Water (1967)	Entre la mer et l'eau douce	Michel Brault
The Cat in the Bag (1964)	Le Chat dans le sac	Gilles Groulx
Don't Let It Kill You (1968)	Il ne faut pas mourir pour ça	Jean Pierre Lefebvre
Dust from Underground (1968)	Poussière sur la ville	Arthur Lamothe
High (1967)		Larry Kent
The Rape of a Sweet Young Girl (1968)	Le Viol d'une jeune fille douce	Gilles Carle
The Revolutionary (1965)	Le Révolutionnaire	Jean Pierre Lefebvre

== Official Awards ==
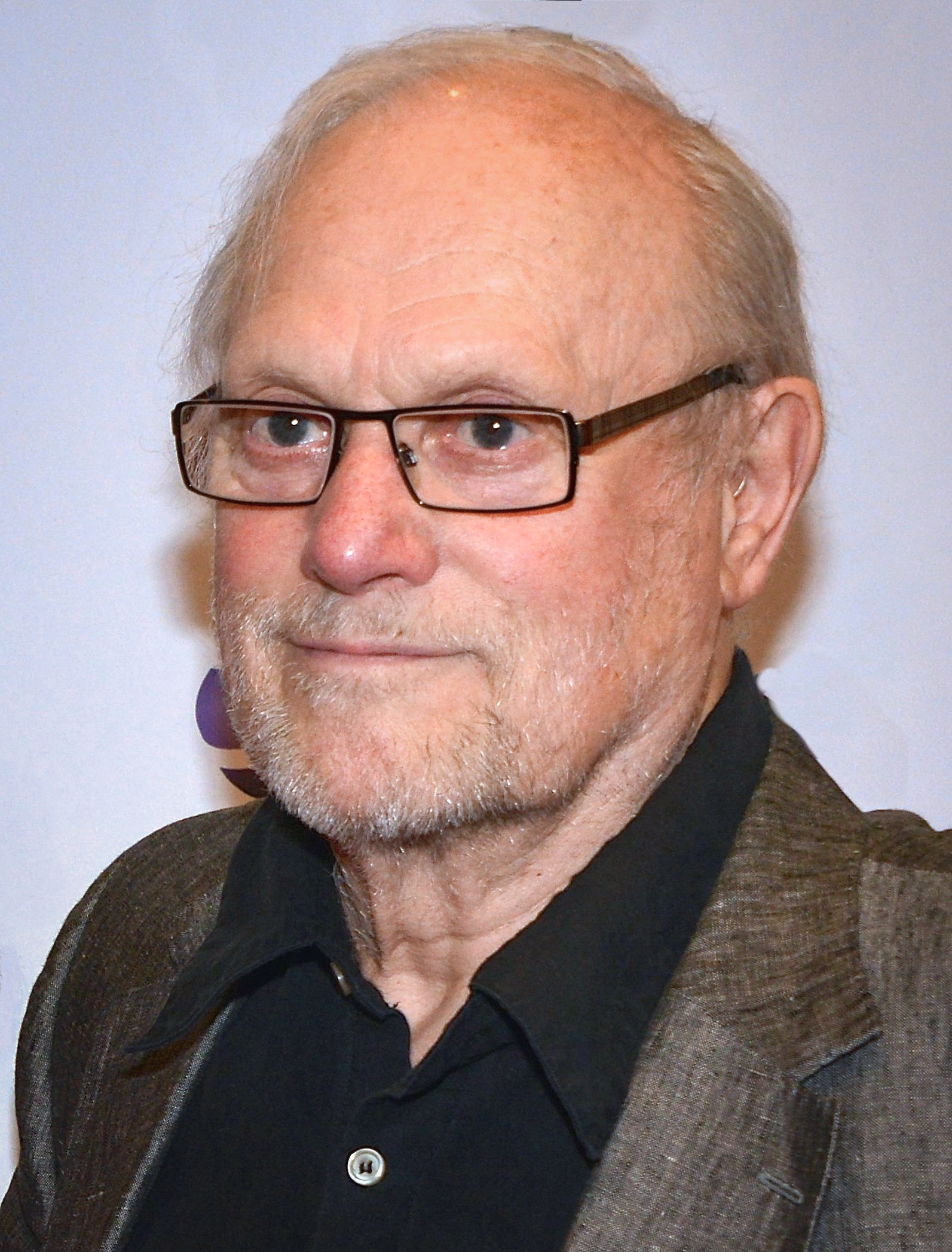
Jan Troell, winner of the Golden Bear at the event

The following prizes were awarded by the Jury:

- Golden Bear: Who Saw Him Die? by Jan Troell
- Silver Bear for Best Director: Carlos Saura for Peppermint Frappé
- Silver Bear for Best Actress: Stéphane Audran for Les Biches
- Silver Bear for Best Actor: Jean-Louis Trintignant for The Man Who Lies
- Silver Bear Extraordinary Jury Prize:
  - Innocence Unprotected by Dušan Makavejev
  - Sings of Life by Werner Herzog
  - Something Like Love by Enzo Muzii

== Independent Awards ==
=== Youth Film Award – Best Feature Film Suitable for Young People ===
- Come l'amore by Enzo Muzii

=== FIPRESCI Award ===
- Innocence Unprotected by Dušan Makavejev
  - Honorable Mention: Asta Nielsen

=== Interfilm Award – Otto Dibelius Film Award ===
- Who Saw Him Die? by Jan Troell

=== OCIC Award ===
- Who Saw Him Die? by Jan Troell

=== UNICRIT Award ===
- Who Saw Him Die? by Jan Troell

=== IWG Golden Plaque ===
- Who Saw Him Die? by Jan Troell
- The Man Who Lies by Alain Robbe-Grillet
