= Oswald d'Andréa =

French pianist and composer of music (1934–2024)

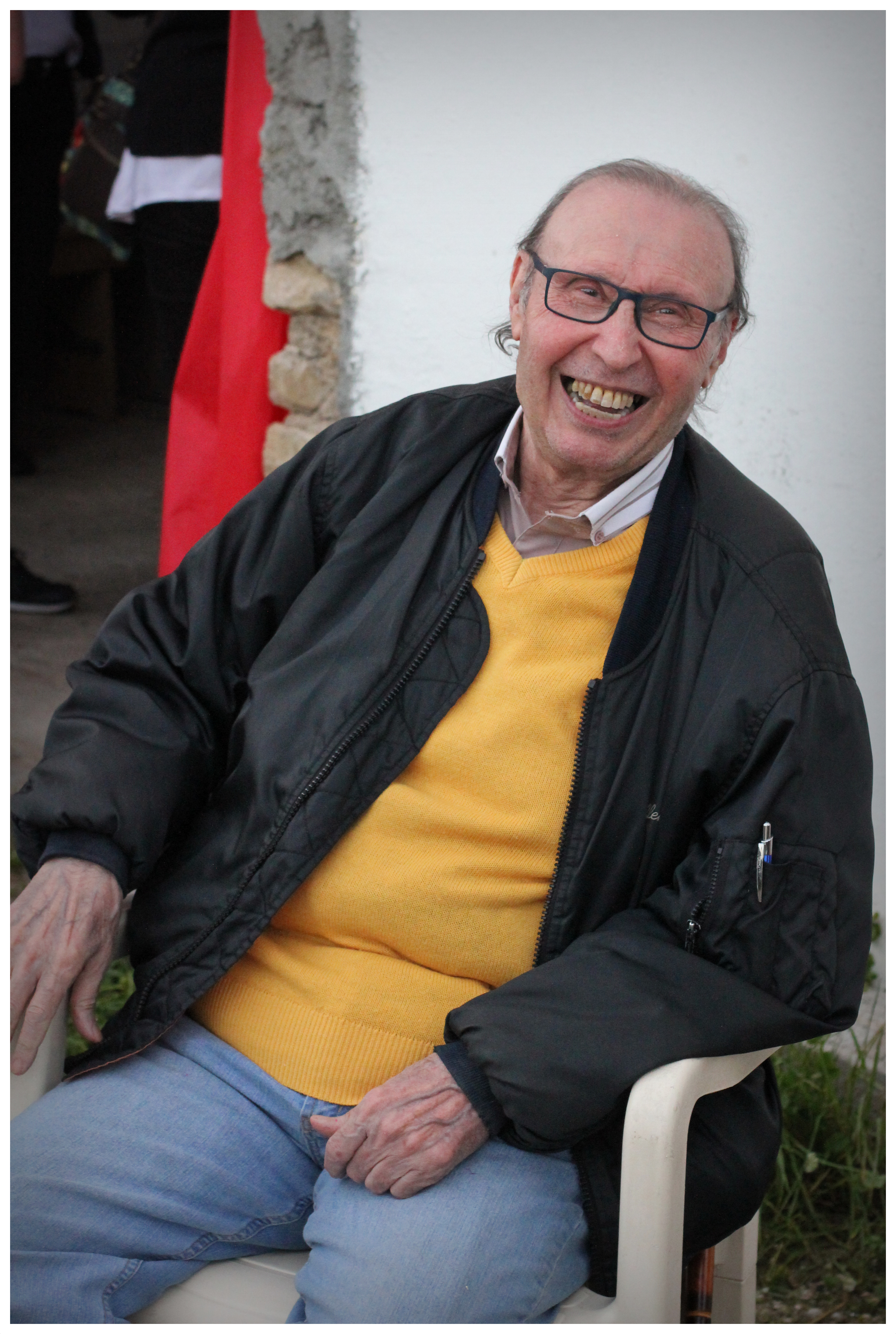
D'Andréa in 2016

Oswald Antoine Marie d'Andréa (9 August 1934 – 4 September 2024) was a French pianist and composer of music for film, television and radio.

== Life and career ==
D'Andréa was born in Tunis on 9 August 1934.

His recorded output varied from pop in the early '60s to jazz and movie soundtracks, one of which—La Vie et Rien d'Autre—won the 1990 César for Best Music.

D'Andréa died on 4 September 2024, at the age of 90.

== Discography ==
- 1962: Un Premier Amour EP (with Le 4 de Coeur) (Polydor)
- 1964: Tokyo 64 (Olympic Disc) (Polydor)
- 1967: Starting-Music Auto (Polydor)
- 1968: Les Indicatifs de RTL Non Stop EP (Moshé-Naïm)
- 1969: Concerto pour Commencer un Concert (Moshé-Naïm) (reissued on CD as Pièces Concertantes pour Piano)
- 1969: Galaxie EP (Moshé-Naïm)
- 1970: 12 Divertissements pour Piano (Moshé-Naïm)
- 1970: Major Barbara EP (Disques Jacques Canetti)
- 1971: Le Temps: 0-12-24 (Moshé-Naïm)
- 1973: Le Temps: Les 12 Signes du Zodiaque (Moshé-Naïm)
- 1977: Musiques Originales des Films Imaginaires (Moshé-Naïm)
- 1977: Piano-Formes (Moshé-Naïm)
- 198?: Brecht Konzert (with Nicole d'Andréa) (Moshé-Naïm)
- 1989: La Vie et Rien d'Autre soundtrack (Polydor)
- 1995: Deux Pianos sur Scène (with Nicole d'Andréa) (Moshé-Naïm/Musidisc)
- 1996: Capitaine Conan soundtrack (Sony Music (France))
- 2001: The Sound of Time (Moshé-Naïm/Emen)
