= Who Saw Him Die? =

- Directed by: Jan Troell
- Written by: Clas Engström (also novel); Jan Troell; Bengt Forslund
- Produced by: Bengt Forslund
- Starring: Per Oscarsson
- Cinematography: Jan Troell
- Release date: 18 March 1968
- Running time: 110 minutes
- Country: Sweden
- Language: Swedish

Who Saw Him Die? (Swedish: Ole dole doff, a counting-out rhyme similar to eeny, meeny, miny, moe) is a 1968 black-and-white Swedish film about a liberal teacher struggling with the demands of teaching a classroom of unruly children. The screenplay is by Clas Engström, based on his own novel. The film won the Golden Bear at the 18th Berlin International Film Festival in 1968.

== Cast ==
- Per Oscarsson - Sören Mårtensson
- Ann-Marie Gyllenspetz - Anne-Marie
- Kerstin Tidelius - Gunvor Mårtensson
- Bengt Ekerot - Eriksson
- Harriet Forssell - Mrs. Berg
- Per Sjöstrand - Headmaster
- Georg Oddner - Georg
- Catti Edfeldt - Jane
- Bo Malmqvist - Bengt
