= Liza Vorfi =

- Born: 29 November 1924; Gjakova, Kingdom of Serbs, Croats, and Slovenes
- Died: 29 January 2011 (aged 86); Tirana, Albania

Liza Vorfi (29 November 1924 – 29 January 2011) was an Albanian actress. She played in movies and theaters in supporting role as well as Countess Dizeta in The Return of the Dead Army.

== Biography ==
In 1932, Vorfi's family moved to Tirana, Albania from Gjakova (today's Kosovo). She started her artistic career in 1939 as a singer on Radio Tirana. Between 1939 and 1943, she studied in Italy in the Rome Conservatory and then she continued her studies in Pesaro. In 1945 she returned to Albania to appear on stage as an actress.

Along with Behije Çela she was one of the first female actresses of the National Theatre of Albania. She played her first role in "Gjido". In her long career she interpreted more than 60 roles on stage and also appeared in films. After Vorfi's husband was put in prison along with many intellectuals that had studied in Austria, Vorfi was expelled from the National Theatre for a year.

She will be remembered for her interpretation of the old lady in the Radiostacioni movie.

Vorfi died at the age of 86 on 29 January 2011.
