= Dušan Makavejev =

Serbian film director and screenwriter (1932–2019)

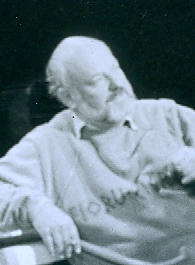
- Makavejev in 1989
- Born: 13 October 1932; Belgrade, Yugoslavia
- Died: 25 January 2019 (aged 86); Belgrade, Serbia
- Education: Faculty of Dramatic Arts, University of Arts in Belgrade
- Occupations: Film director, screenwriter
- Years active: 1965–1996
- Spouse: Bojana Marijan (m. 1964)

Dušan Makavejev (Serbian Cyrillic: Душан Макавејев, pronounced [dǔʃan makaʋějeʋ]; 13 October 1932 – 25 January 2019) was a Serbian film director and screenwriter. He is known for his groundbreaking films of Yugoslav cinema in the late 1960s and early 1970s—many of which belong to the Black Wave. His films combined documentary and fictional elements with political satire, experimental editing, and explorations of sexuality. Makavejev's most internationally successful film was the 1971 political satire W.R.: Mysteries of the Organism, which he both directed and wrote.

== Career ==
Makavejev's first three feature films, Man Is Not a Bird (1965, starring actress and icon of the "Black Wave" period in film, Milena Dravić), Love Affair, or the Case of the Missing Switchboard Operator (1967, starring actress and icon of the "Black Wave" period in film, Eva Ras) and Innocence Unprotected (1968), all won him international acclaim. The last-mentioned won the Silver Bear Extraordinary Prize of the Jury at the 18th Berlin International Film Festival. In 1970 he was a member of the jury at the 20th Berlin International Film Festival. In 1991 he was a member of the jury at the 17th Moscow International Film Festival.

His 1971 movie W.R.: Mysteries of the Organism (starring Milena Dravić, Jagoda Kaloper, and Ivica Vidović) was banned in Yugoslavia due to its sexual and political content. He described authoritarian figures in the film as people who are not in control of themselves striving to control others. The political scandal surrounding Makavejev's film effectively ended the director's domestic career and resulted in his leaving Yugoslavia to live and work abroad in Europe and North America. Makavejev's next film, Sweet Movie (1974), was the first feature work that the director produced entirely outside of Yugoslavia (the film was made in Canada, France, Germany and in the Netherlands). The film's explicit depiction of sex together with its bold treatment of the more taboo dimensions of sexuality reduced the size of its audience (i.e. it was largely confined to the art house context) and also resulted in the film's being censored in several countries. Makavejev said: "After Sweet Movie it was as if I had burned all my bridges. I just lost the chance to talk to producers."

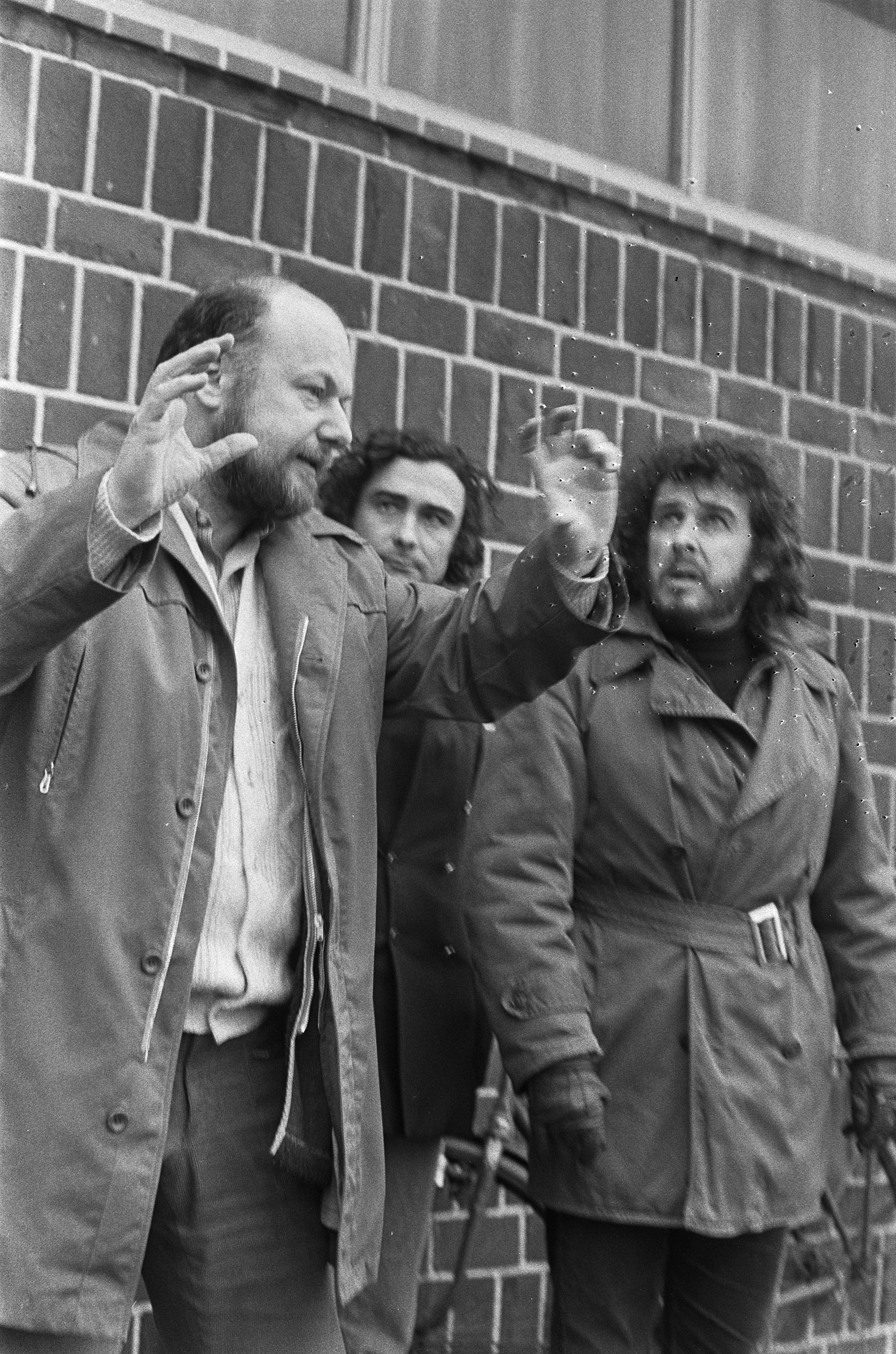
Makavejev (left) in Amsterdam in March 1974

After a seven-year hiatus in feature film production, Makavejev released the comparatively more conventional black comedy entitled Montenegro (1981). The director's next feature film, The Coca-Cola Kid (1985), which was based on short stories by Frank Moorhouse and featured performances by Eric Roberts and Greta Scacchi, is arguably his most accessible picture.

Makavejev appears as one of the narrators in the 2007 Serbian documentary film Zabranjeni bez zabrane (Banned without being banned), which gives profound insight into the history and the nature of Yugoslav film censorship through its investigation of the country's distinctive political-cultural mechanisms for unofficially banning politically controversial films. The film contains original interviews with key filmmakers from the communist era.

He published two books of selected articles: Poljubac za drugaricu parolu (1960) and 24 sličice u sekundi (1965).

== Views ==
In 1993 Makavejev wrote and appeared in a half hour televised Opinions lecture in Britain, produced by Open Media for Channel 4 and subsequently published in The Times. Makavejev speaks of himself as a citizen of the world but "of the leftovers of Yugoslavia too". He cites Jacques Tourneur's Hollywood horror classic Cat People as one of the rare films in the history of the cinema that mention Serbs, "a people from an obscure region who were haunted by evil; when hurt they turn into ferocious cats, like panthers, and killed those whom they thought to be the source of hurt of rejection". He comments on the division of Bosnia on ethnic lines:

"Creators of nationalist myths, both Serbs and Croats, came from the same mountainous region that was probably the source of this Hollywood story. Before the armed conflict, these people were whipping up nationalist fever and indoctrination until conflict became inevitable and both nations were trapped in a bloody embrace...How long will it take for an ethnically "clean" state for every single person who miraculously stays alive? A state for each family, a state for the father in case he is a Croat, a state for the mother in case she is a Muslim, a state for the daughter in case she is a Yugoslav, a state for the son in case he is a Serb, a specific flag for the dog, a currency for the cat."

== Filmography ==
Feature films

Year	Film	Director	Writer	Awards / Notes
1965	Man is Not a Bird	Yes	Yes	
1967	Love Affair, or the Case of the Missing Switchboard Operator	Yes	Yes	
1968	Innocence Unprotected	Yes	Yes	Silver Berlin Bear and FIPRESCI Prize at the Berlin International Film Festival
1971	W.R.: Mysteries of the Organism	Yes	Yes	Gold Hugo at Chicago International Film Festival
1974	Sweet Movie	Yes	Yes	
1981	Montenegro	Yes	Yes	Audience Award and Mostra Special Award at São Paulo International Film Festival, Palme d'Or nominee
1985	Coca-Cola Kid	Yes	No	Palme d'Or nominee
1988	Manifesto	Yes	Yes	
1993	Gorilla Bathes at Noon	Yes	Yes	
1994	Hole in the Soul	Yes	Yes	
1996	Danish Girls Show Everything	Yes	Yes	Co-author, anthology film

Short films

- Jatgan mala (1953)
- Pečat (1955)
- Antonijevo razbijeno ogledalo (1957)
- Spomenicima ne treba verovati (1958)
- Osmjeh '61 (1961)
- Eci peci pec (1961)
- Parada (1962)
- Nova domaća životinja (1964)
