= El Bordo =

El Bordo may refer to:

== Places ==
- El Bordo, Salta, town in Argentina
- El Bordo, Cauca, town in Colombia

== Other uses ==
- El Bordo (band), Argentinian rock band
- El Bordo, 1960 novel by Sergio Galindo

== See also ==
- Bordo (disambiguation)
