= Monkey Trouble =

- Theatrical release poster
- Directed by: Franco Amurri
- Written by: Franco Amurri; Stu Krieger
- Produced by: Mimi Polk; Heidi Rufus Isaacs
- Starring: Thora Birch; Mimi Rogers; Christopher McDonald; Harvey Keitel
- Cinematography: Luciano Tovoli
- Edited by: Ray Lovejoy
- Music by: Mark Mancina
- Production companies: Percy Main; Effe Productions; Victor Company of Japan; Ridley Scott Productions
- Distributed by: New Line Cinema
- Release date: March 18, 1994
- Running time: 96 minutes
- Countries: United States; Japan
- Language: English
- Box office: $16.5 million

Monkey Trouble is a 1994 comedy film directed by Franco Amurri, and starring Thora Birch and Harvey Keitel. Amurri dedicated the film to his daughter Eva and named the film's protagonist after her.

== Plot ==
In Los Angeles, nine-year-old Eva Gregory longs for a pet dog, but cannot get one because her mother, Amy, believes she is irresponsible enough and her stepfather, Tom, a police lieutenant, is allergic to fur. Eva is unable to keep a pet at her father Peter's house, because of his job as a pilot and his frequent travels. Tom's daughter, Tessa, occasionally babysits Eva and her toddler brother Jack.

Romani kleptomaniac Azro lives with his Capuchin monkey Fingers in Venice Beach, where he uses him to lure tourists and pickpocket them. They are approached by mafia members Drake and Charlie, who propose they join their crime syndicate. Fingers uses his pickpocket skills to burglarize wealthy homes. During a test run, they steal expensive items from Eva's home, leading to Azro's admission to the crime group. Fingers is treated poorly by Azro, and eventually runs away, where he hides in a park near Eva's house.

The next day, as Eva returns home from school, Fingers drops from a tree and latches onto Eva. She instantly connects with him and names him "Dodger", as he likes Eva's Dodgers baseball hat. Eva hides the monkey in her bedroom, but when she has to attend school, she leaves him in the care of a pet store businesswoman named Annie. Azro unsuccessfully tries to locate the monkey, much to the frustration of the mafia members.

Eva learns that Peter will leave town during the weekend when she is supposed to visit him. She keeps this from her parents so that she can have his place to herself and Dodger for the weekend. Dodger enters the locked house by climbing in an unlatched upstairs window. With no money for food, Eva decides to busk for earnings with Dodger at the Venice Beach Boardwalk. While Eva rides her bike to the boardwalk, Dodger and Azro spot and chase each other. Azro is taken away by the mafia members before he can capture the monkey. Dodger pickpockets several people without Eva's knowledge during their performance. Eva discovers the stolen goods in her backpack, and spends the rest of the weekend attempting to stop Dodger from pickpocketing.

Azro learns about the incident and receives Peter's address. Azro arrives at Eva's house, frightening her and Dodger. Eva calls the police, but Azro informs the deputy that Eva dialed 911 as a joke. Eva arrives home safely, but Tom notices she has dropped a piece of jewelry. He and Amy discover more stolen jewelry in Eva's room.

Azro manages to steal back Dodger, much to Eva's horror. She tries to explain what happened to her parents, but they do not believe her. Eva looks for Dodger in the park, but encounters Azro. Amy and Tom realize the truth, and Azro is arrested by the police. Tom manages to overcome his allergy to monkey fur. Eva meets Azro's son, Mark, who comes to get Dodger back. Dodger leaves with Mark, but changes his mind and returns to Eva. Later, Eva shows both him and Jack to her classmates at school.

== Cast ==
- Finster as Fingers / Dodger
  - Frank Welker provides Dodger's vocal effects
- Thora Birch as Eva Gregory
- Mimi Rogers as Amy Gregory
- Adrian and Julian Johnson as Jack Gregory
- Christopher McDonald as Tom Gregory
- Harvey Keitel as Azro
- Alison Elliott as Tessa
- Remy Ryan as Katie Hernandez
- Jo Champa as Annie
- John LaFayette as Officer Cates
- Andi Chapman as Christine the Teacher
- Julie Payne as the Librarian
- Kimberly Cullum as Jesse
- Deborah White as Missy
- Adam LaVorgna as Mark
- Robert Miranda as Drake
- Victor Argo as Charlie
- Kevin Scannell as Peter Boylan
- Robert A. Perry as Echo-Man, Himself
- Tereza Ellis as Female Cashier
- Aaron Lustig as Store Manager

== Production ==
Development on the film, initially titled Pet, began at Paramount Pictures in 1991 with Franco Amurri attached after having done Flashback for the studio. The film came close to being greenlit twice at Paramount, until the project went into turnaround, which led to it being picked up by producer Mimi Polk of Ridley Scott's Percy Main Productions.

In May 1993, Pet was one of three active monkey/ape films announced to be in development along with Dunston Checks In (then known as Prime Mates) at 20th Century Fox and Ed (then known as You Should See Them Play) at Universal Pictures.

== Soundtrack ==
The film contains the following songs.

- "Sold for Me" – The Aintree Boys
- "Posie" – The Aintree Boys
- "Who Gets the Loot" – Quo
- "VB Rap" – Gee Boyz
- "Girls" – Gee Boyz
- "Monkey Shines" – Robert J. Walsh

== Reception ==
=== Box office ===
The film debuted at number 3 in the North American box office, dropping to seventh place the following week.

=== Critical reception ===
On Rotten Tomatoes, Monkey Trouble has a rating of 58% based on 12 critics' reviews.

Roger Ebert awarded the film three stars, and though he said it has a formulaic plot, he called it a "splendid family film." He added, "It's no mistake that the credits for 'Monkey Trouble' give top billing to the monkey, named Finster. He steals the show with a fetching performance that goes beyond 'training,' and into acting itself. And the show is a quirky, bright, PG-rated adventure that's as entertaining as 'Free Willy.'" Ebert did criticize the film's decision to identify the villain character as a gypsy, reasoning Azro "could have had a non-specific background and the movie would have worked just as well, without giving its young audiences a lesson in prejudice."

David Hunter of The Hollywood Reporter positively cited Thora Birch's performance and wrote "Rising to the occasion in just about every scene, she wonderfully executes the humor, wonder, excitement and brief troubles her character experiences in Franco Amurri and Stu Krieger's well-groomed screenplay."

Positive reviews also cited the film for showing Harvey Keitel's "broad comic side." Joanna Berry of the Radio Times wrote, "Quite what the hard-as-nails star of Reservoir Dogs and Bad Lieutenant is doing in this comedy adventure is anyone's guess, but his tongue-in-cheek performance will delight adults almost as much as the monkey business will enchant young children."

=== Year-end lists ===
- Dishonorable mention – John Hurley, Staten Island Advance

== Home media ==
New Line released Monkey Trouble on DVD on September 3, 2002.
