= Origins of the Mafia =

1976 television crime-drama miniseries

- Screenplay by: Brando Giordani; Enzo Muzii; David Rintels
- Story by: Leonardo Sciascia; Eric Hobsbawm; Roberto Ciuni
- Directed by: Enzo Muzii
- Narrated by: Richard Johnson
- Composer: Nino Rota
- Countries of origin: United Kingdom, Italy
- Original language: English
- No. of seasons: 1
- No. of episodes: 5

Production
- Producers: Brando Giordani; Bernard J. Kingham
- Cinematography: Giuseppe Rotunno
- Editor: Mauro Bonanni

Original release
- Release: November 19 – December 17, 1976

Origins of the Mafia (Italian: Alle origini della mafia) is a 1976 television crime-drama miniseries directed by Enzo Muzii. A co-production between Italian RAI and British ITC, it deals with the roots of the Sicilian mafia between 1575 and 1875. It consists of five episodes, and each episode is structured as a standalone narrative.

== Cast ==
=== Episode 1: Gli antenati (The Ancestors) ===
- Lee J. Cobb as Bartolomeo Gramignano
- Joseph Cotten as the King's envoy
- Edward Albert as Sebastian
- Renato Salvatori as the Captain
- Claudio Camaso as Giuseppe Gramignano
- Franco Garofalo as Vittorio Gramignano
- Giuseppe Addobbati as the Miller

=== Episode 2: La legge (The Law) ===
- Mel Ferrer as Armando Della Morra
- John McEnery as Pietro
- Massimo Girotti as Viceroy Caracciolo
- Laura Troschel as Isabella
- Biagio Pelligra as Angelo La Parma
- Cesare Gelli as Rosario
- Donato Castellaneta as Tomassino
- Valentino Macchi as the Lawyer
- Rodolfo Baldini as Prince Ostuni
- Loris Bazzocchi as Nicola
- Vittorio Duse as the Sacristan

=== Episode 3: Gli sciacalli (Jackals) ===
- Tony Musante as Michele Borello
- Fernando Rey as Baron Della Spina
- Fausto Tozzi as Nicu Borello
- Rejane Medeiros as Barbara Della Spina
- Remo Girone as Antonio Della Spina
- Leopoldo Trieste as Lawyer Mazzullo
- Guido Alberti as the Maltese
- Paul Müller as the Judge
- Marzio Margine as Salvatore
- Stefania Spugnini as Serafina
- Luigi Uzzo as Gioacchino
- Guido Cerniglia as the Manager

=== Episode 4: La speranza (Hope) ===
- Trevor Howard as Don Consalvo Saccone
- Tom Skerritt as Bernardino Campo
- Giancarlo Sbragia as Prefect Mieli
- Massimo Serato as Marquis Tarcone
- Valeria Moriconi as Isabella Mieli
- Spiros Focas as La Monica
- Francesca Muzio as Lucetta
- Gianfranco Barra as the Secretary
- Umberto Spadaro
- Enzo Consoli as Nicola
- Consuelo Ferrara as Mara
- Alessandro Haber as Pietro
- Stanko Molnar as Leonardo

=== Episode 5: L'omertà (Omertà) ===
- Katharine Ross as Rosa Mastrangelo
- Tony Lo Bianco as Nino Sciallacca
- James Mason as Vianisi
- Paolo Bonacelli as Vincenzo Biscetta
- Renzo Montagnani as Antonio Mastrangelo
- Claudio Gora as Felice Balsamo
- Piero Di Iorio as Corrao
- Massimo Sarchielli as the Sheriff
- Luciano Catenacci as Rocco Matranga
- Amedeo Nazzari as the Senator

== Production ==
Before shootings, Muzii and Leonardo Sciascia spent over two years in historical researches. The series was shot in Sicily, with shootings wrapping in August 1975.

== Release ==
In Italy, it was broadcast on Rai 2 between 19 November and 17 December 1976.

== Reception ==
Paul Mavis from DVD Talk wrote: "Storytelling comes first and last here; watching Origins of the Mafia is like diving into a really long, good book that, while not stylistically compelling, is dramatically most satisfying", and noted: "If you love Mafia movies, Origins of the Mafia is necessary viewing […] a leisurely paced, confident, cleanly executed TV miniseries".
