= Buongiorno Italia =

Italian morning television show

- Genre: Morning news and talk
- Country of origin: Italy
- No. of seasons: 4

Original release
- Network: Canale 5
- Release: 1981 – 1988

Buongiorno Italia was an Italian morning television show, broadcast by Canale 5 between 1981 and 1984, and reprised for a final season in 1987–8.

== History ==
Among the first morning programs of the Italian television, it was inspired by Good Morning America and its contents included news, interviews, culture and cuisine. It was presented by Marco Columbro and Antonella Vianini (1980-1983), Aba Cercato (1983-1984) and Fiorella Pierobon (1987-8). It included several different segments whose hosts included Maurizio Costanzo, Sylva Koscina, Roberto Gervaso, Ambrogio Fogar.

Since the second edition, the show was on air from 7.30 to 9.30 a.m. (to 10.30 on Saturday morning). It was added a final talk show and a cartoon's section Caffellatte during which were broadcast the anime series The Smurfs, Chobin the Star Child, The Wonderful Wizard of Oz, Lucy May. Every week the show also included a six-episode journalistic report.

The third edition introduced Ottoetrenta ("Eight and thirty"), a ten-minutes section formed by tests, curiosities and interviews. The last section of the program showed behind-the-scenes from mayor television shows of the Fininvest group.

The first theme song of the show was "Buongiorno Italia", composed by Augusto Martelli who also served as orchestral and choir director. From the 1987 edition, the theme song was Fiorella Pierobon's "È l'Italia".
