= Lika Minamoto =

Japanese actress (born 1981)

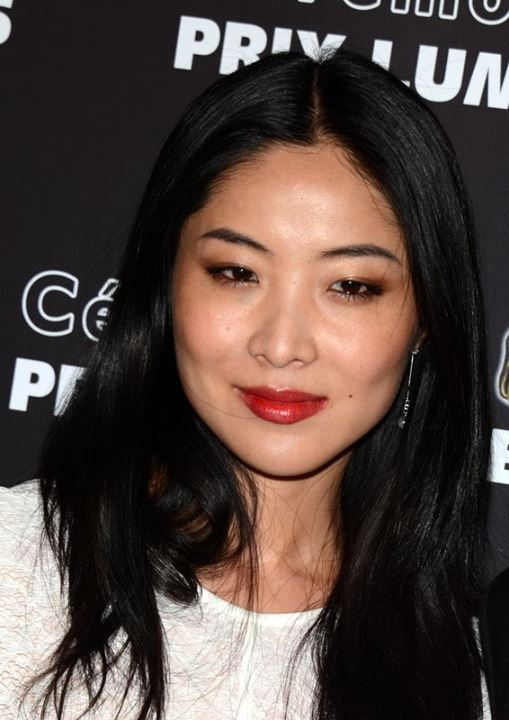
Minamoto at the Prix Lumières in 2014

Lika Minamoto (源利華, Rika Minamoto; born January 6, 1981) is a Japanese actress and model currently residing in France.

== Career ==
Minamoto began modeling while attending university in Japan. After graduating, she worked as an office lady at a major trading company for a few months, but left to pursue a career in film. While on vacation in Paris to take ballet lessons, she was scouted by a French modeling agency, signed a contract, and resumed her modeling career in Paris.

Minamoto became a well-known figure in the European advertising industry, appearing in ads for beauty brands such as Clarins, Dior, La Roche-Posay, L'Oréal, Garnier, Wella, and Agnès b. She also appeared in many music videos for leading English and French acts such as Pet Shop Boys, Alain Chamfort, and David Hallyday.

In the spring of 2006, she auditioned in Paris for the role of Tamao in Edogawa Ranpo-based film Inju: The Beast in the Shadow, opposite Benoît Magimel, and it played at Cannes. Minamoto fell in love at first sight with Academy Award-nominated director Barbet Schroeder, and despite the objections of the Japanese producer, who insisted on using a local celebrity, she won the role 18 months after her audition and after several callbacks. At the 2008 Venice Film Festival, her performance received praise from the New York Times, who called Minamoto "delectable" and the Italian daily La Repubblica who wrote:

All the ingredients to intrigue the audience are there: sex and literature, sadomasochistic tendencies and suspense, exotic settings (Japan) and secret female worlds (geishas). All of this is brought to life by a charming French actor, Benoit Magimel, and a stunningly beautiful Japanese femme fatale, Lika Minamoto.

The film, however, was generally panned.

In 2010, Kenzo Artistic Director Patrick Guege, who had seen Inju, called Minamoto to model for the Kenzo Flower perfume worldwide campaign. She was the first full-blooded Japanese person to appear in a Kenzo advertisement, and the ad helped Flower perfume reach third place in sales in France.

She has continued to work in a wide range of fields, appearing in the English-language Korean film Final Recipe (2013), produced by Malaysian actress Michelle Yeoh, and the 2011 French-language Love and Bruises by Chinese director Lo Ye, who has appeared regularly at the world's three major film festivals.

== Filmography ==
=== Feature films ===
2008: Inju: la Bête dans l'ombre dir. Barbet Schroeder: Tamao (principal role)
2010: Switch dir. Frédéric Schoendoerffer: participation
2011: Love and Bruises dir. Lou Ye: Isako
2012: 30° Couleur dir. Lucien Jean-Baptiste: Ayako
2013: Final Recipe (en) dir. Gena Kim: Kaori
2014: Ablations de Arnold dir. Parscau: Mikako
2018: Tout le monde debout dir. Franck Dubosc: Rachida
2023: À la belle étoile dir. Sébastien Tulard: Cheffe Satomi
2024: Else dir. Thibault Emin: Setsuko

=== Short films ===
2016: Kudelski dir. Mike Figgis: pleasure X
2018: Tout le monde debout dir. Franck Dubosc: Rachida
2019: Les Saints de Kiko dir. Manuel Marmier: Kiko
2021: PURPLEMIND dir. Emy LTR: Silver/Freya

=== Television ===
2011: Comme chez soi: Jade
2012: Lili David dir. Christophe Barraud: Rose Osawa
2013: No Limit dir. Alain Figlarz and David Morley (season 2): Lynn Pan
2015: Le Passager dir. Jérôme Cornuau: Junko
2018: Nina (season 4): guest, Akiko
