= Silver Bear Grand Jury Prize =

Award presented annually by the Berlin International Film Festival

- Silberner Bär (German)
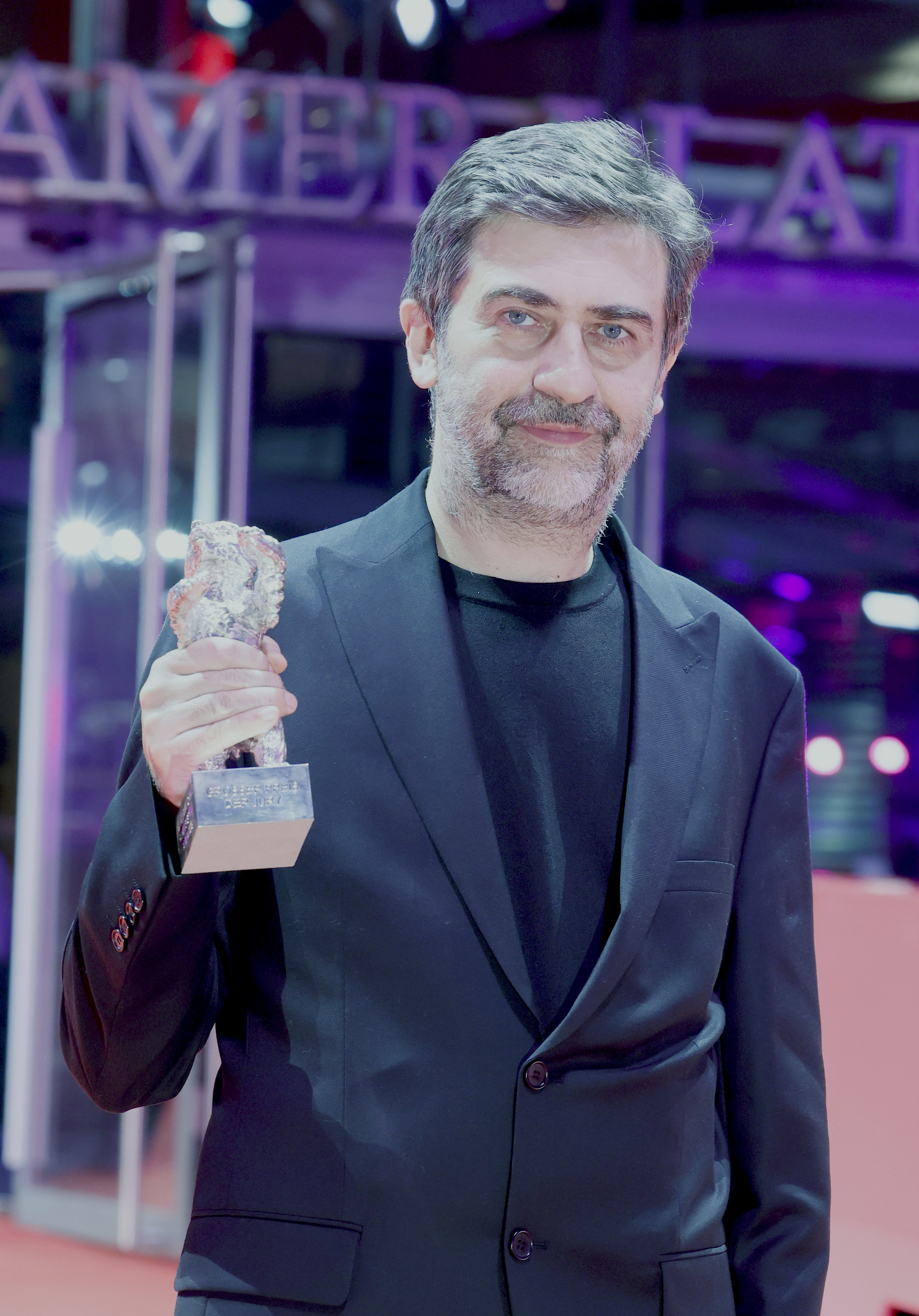
- 2026 recipient: Emin Alper
- Location: Berlin
- Country: Germany
- Presented by: Berlin International Film Festival
- First award: 1965
- Final award: Salvation by Emin Alper
- Website: https://www.berlinale.de/en/festival/awards-and-juries/international-jury.html

The Silver Bear Grand Jury Prize (also Jury Grand Prix, Grand Prize of the Jury) is an award given by the jury at the Berlin International Film Festival to one of the feature films in competition. It is the runner-up to the Golden Bear prize and is considered the second most prestigious prize at the festival.

== History ==
The award was first introduced at the 15th Berlin International Film Festival in 1965. The prize was also formerly known as the Special Jury Prize.

In 2014 at the 64th Berlin International Film Festival, its title was officially changed to "Grand Jury Prize".

== Winners ==
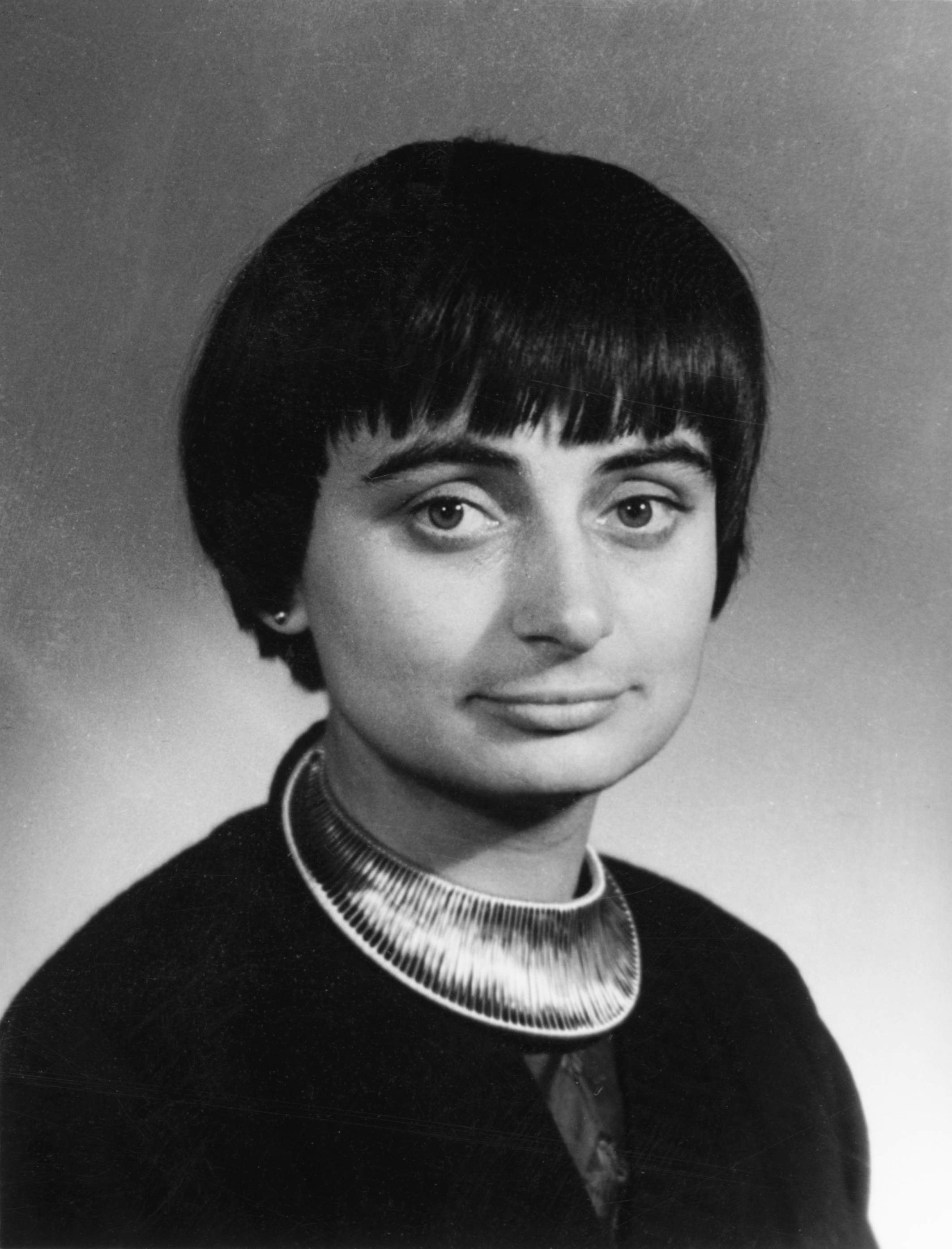
Agnès Varda won for Le Bonheur (1965)

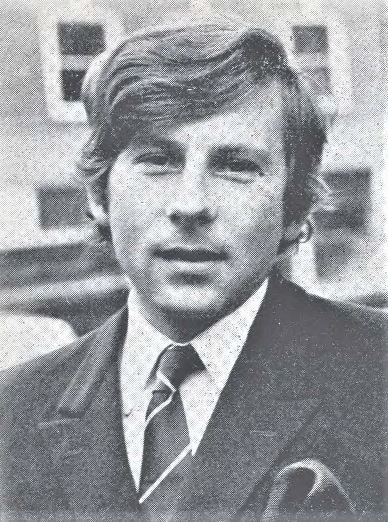
Roman Polanski won for Repulsion (1965)

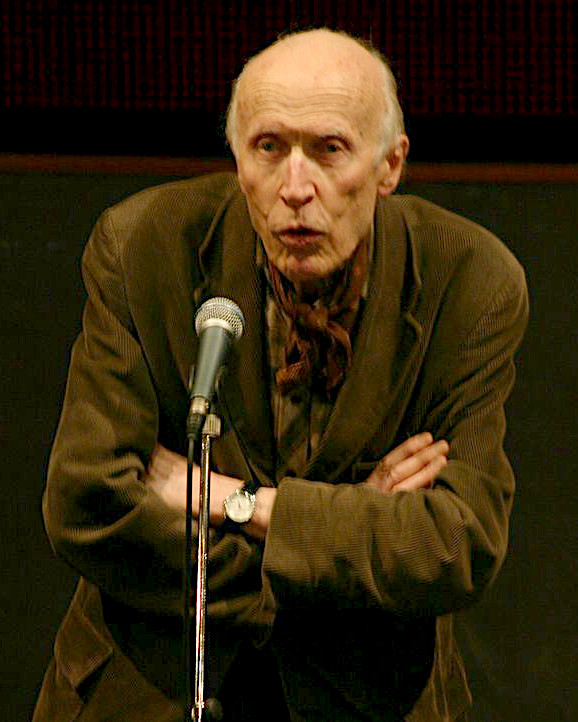
Éric Rohmer won for La Collectionneuse (1967)

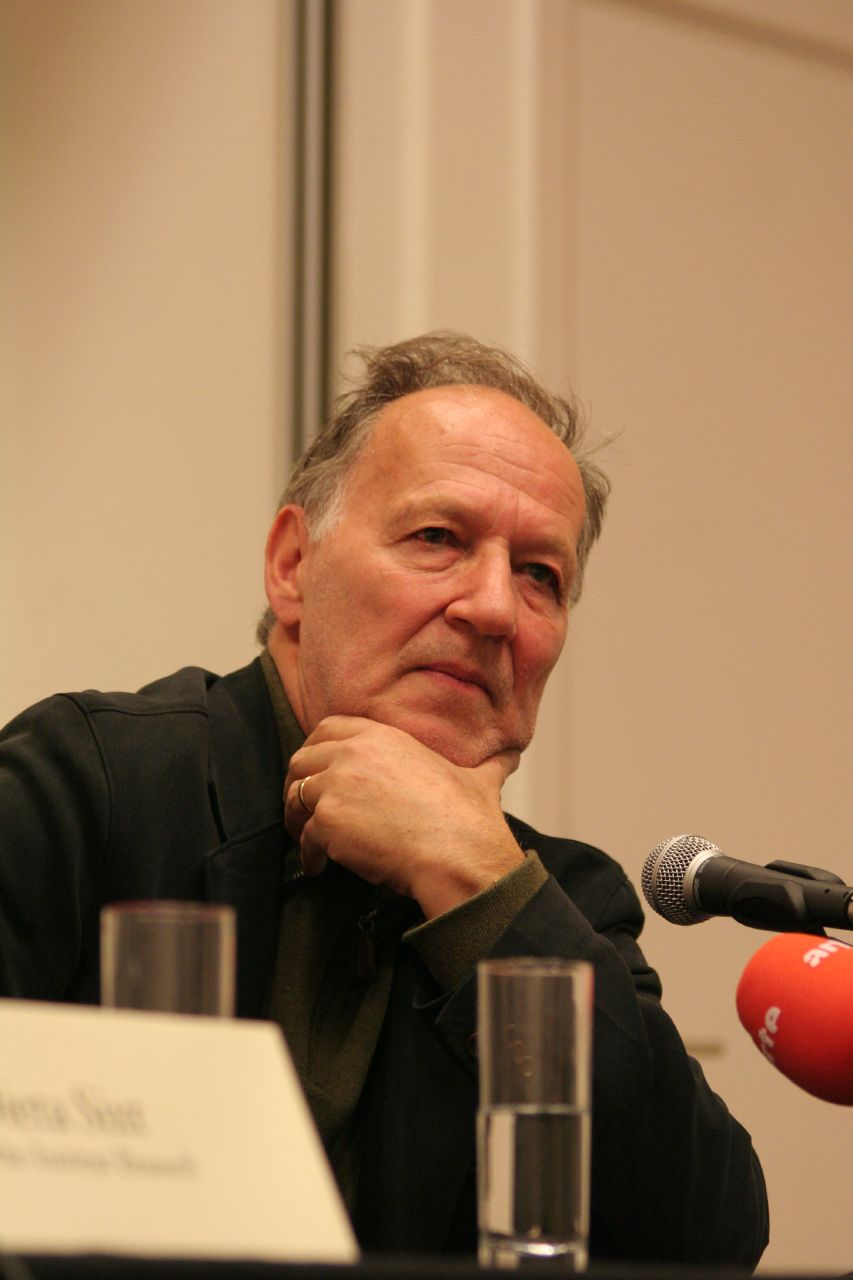
Werner Herzog won for Signs of Life (1968)

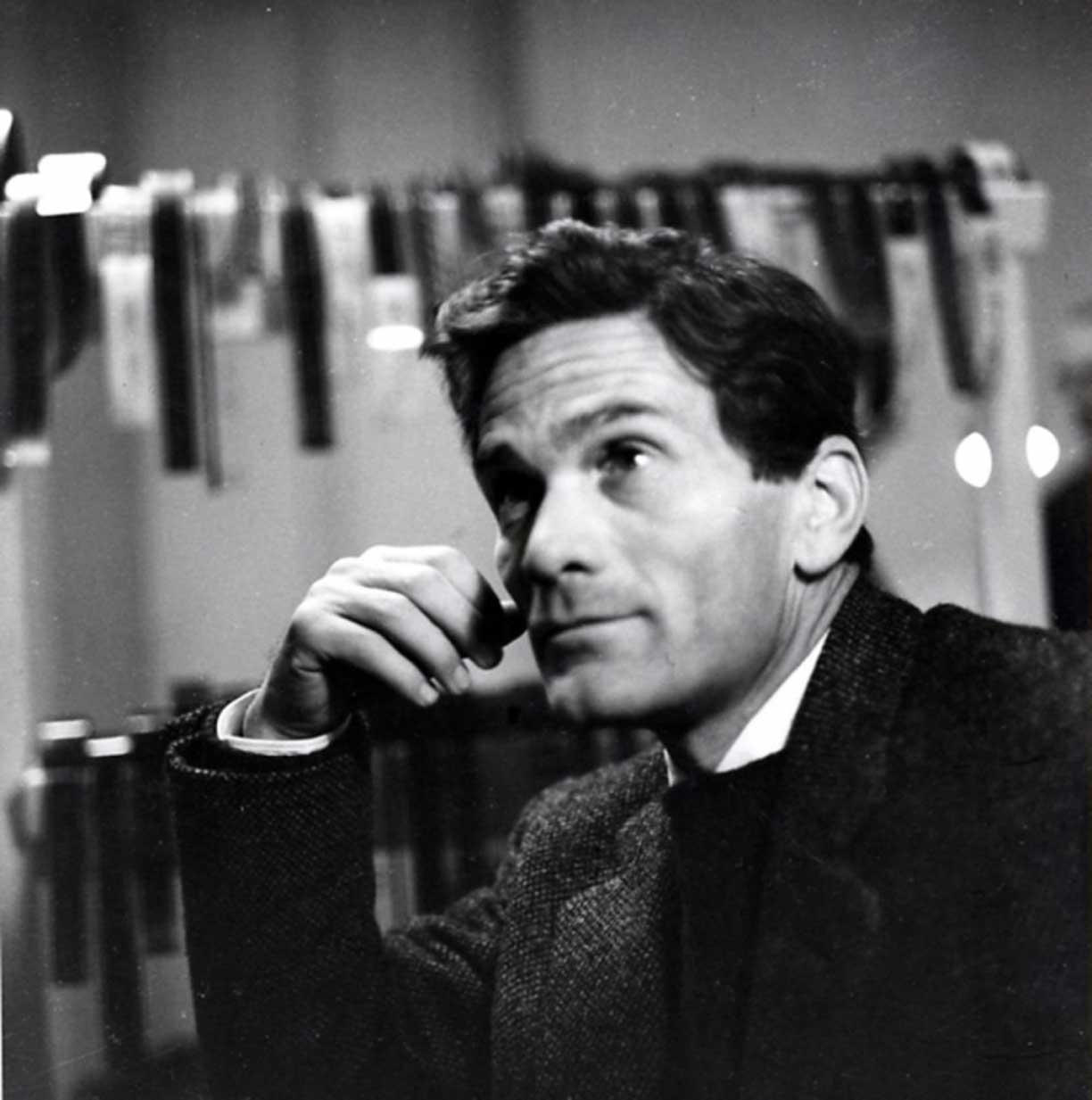
Pier Paolo Pasolini won for The Decameron (1971)

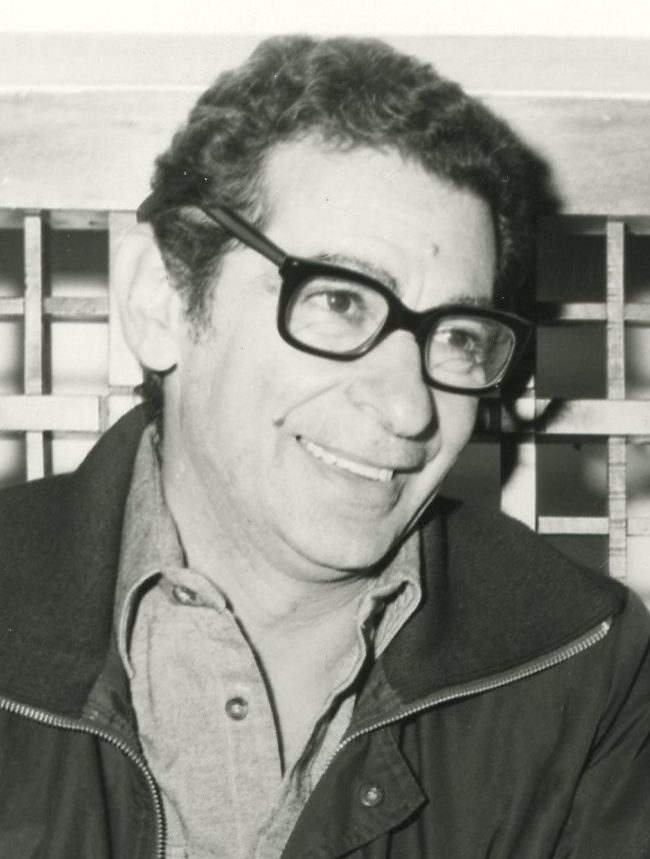
Youssef Chahine, won for Alexandria... Why? (1979)

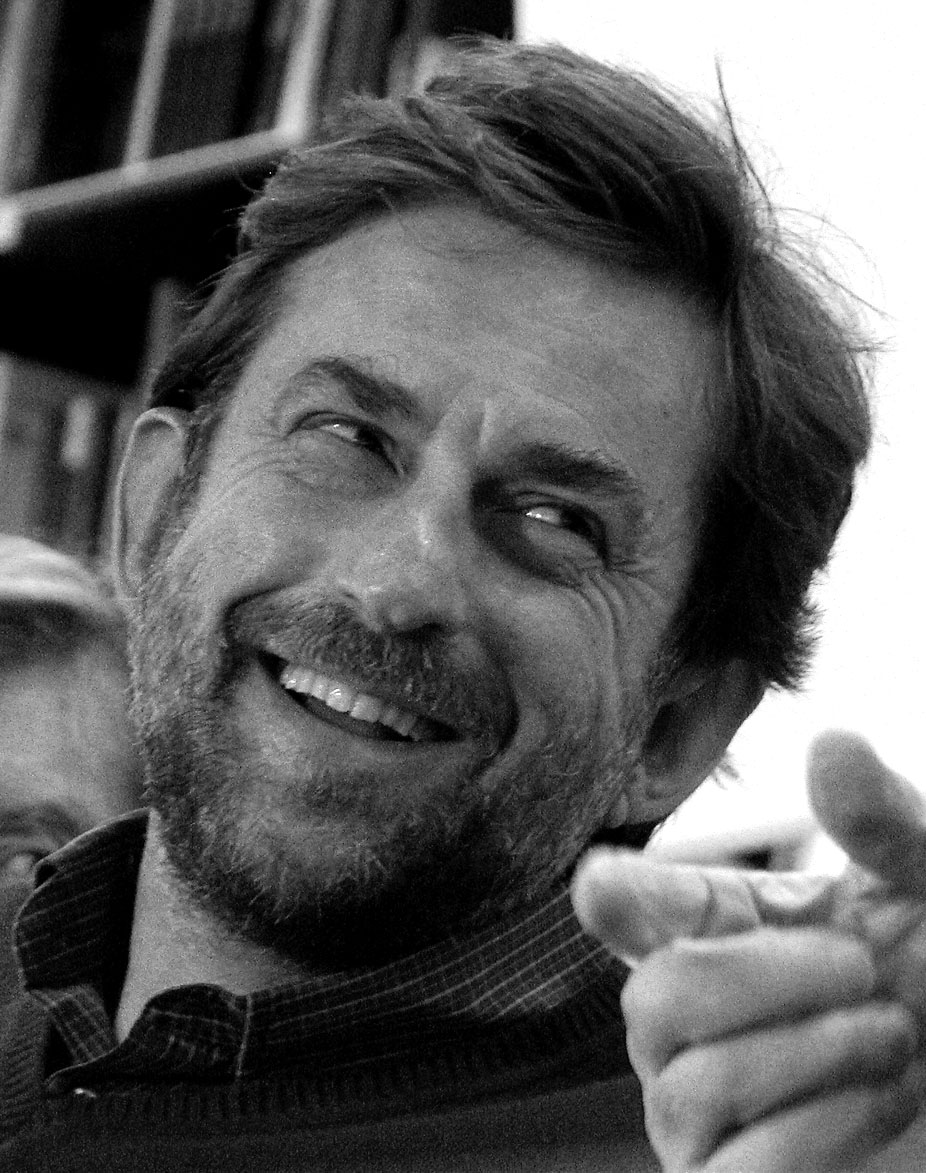
Nanni Moretti won for The Mass Is Ended (1986)

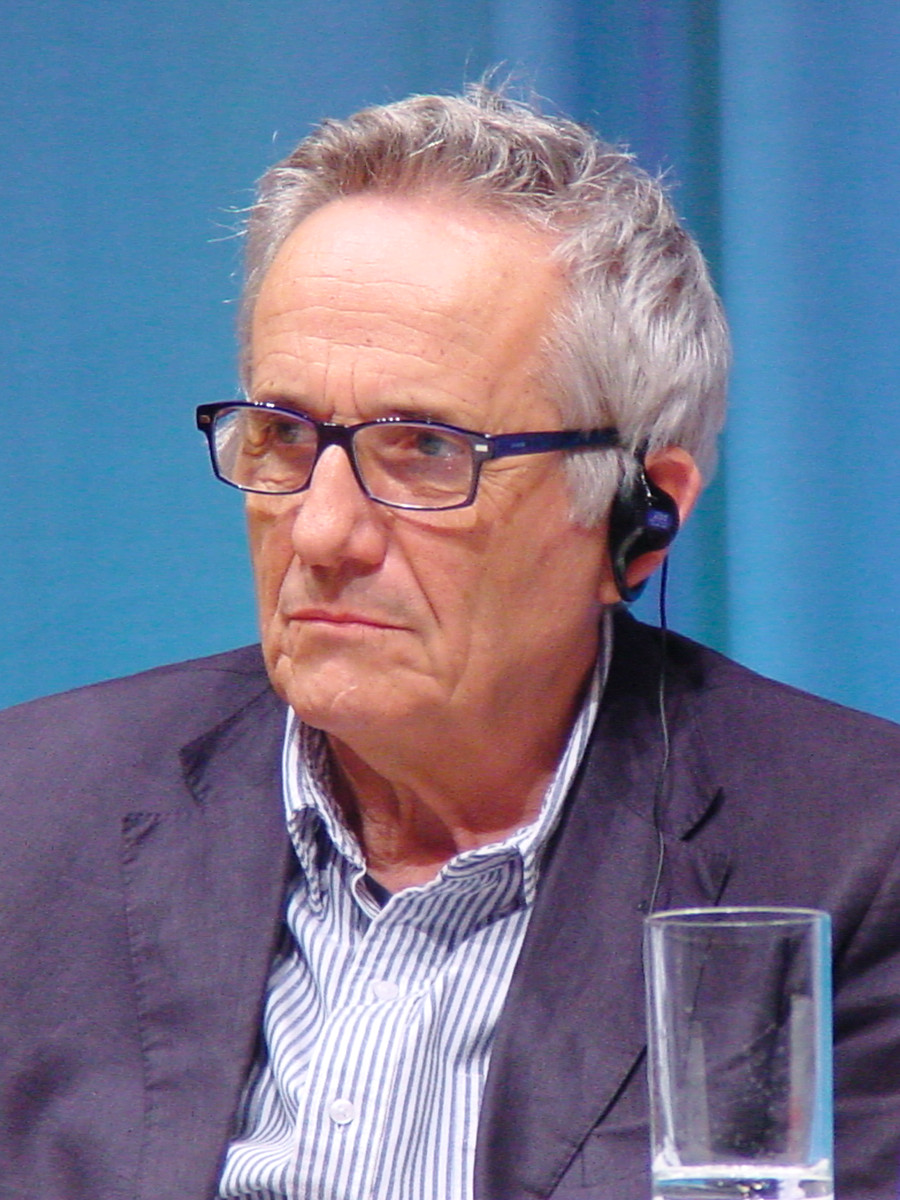
Marco Bellocchio won for The Conviction (1991)

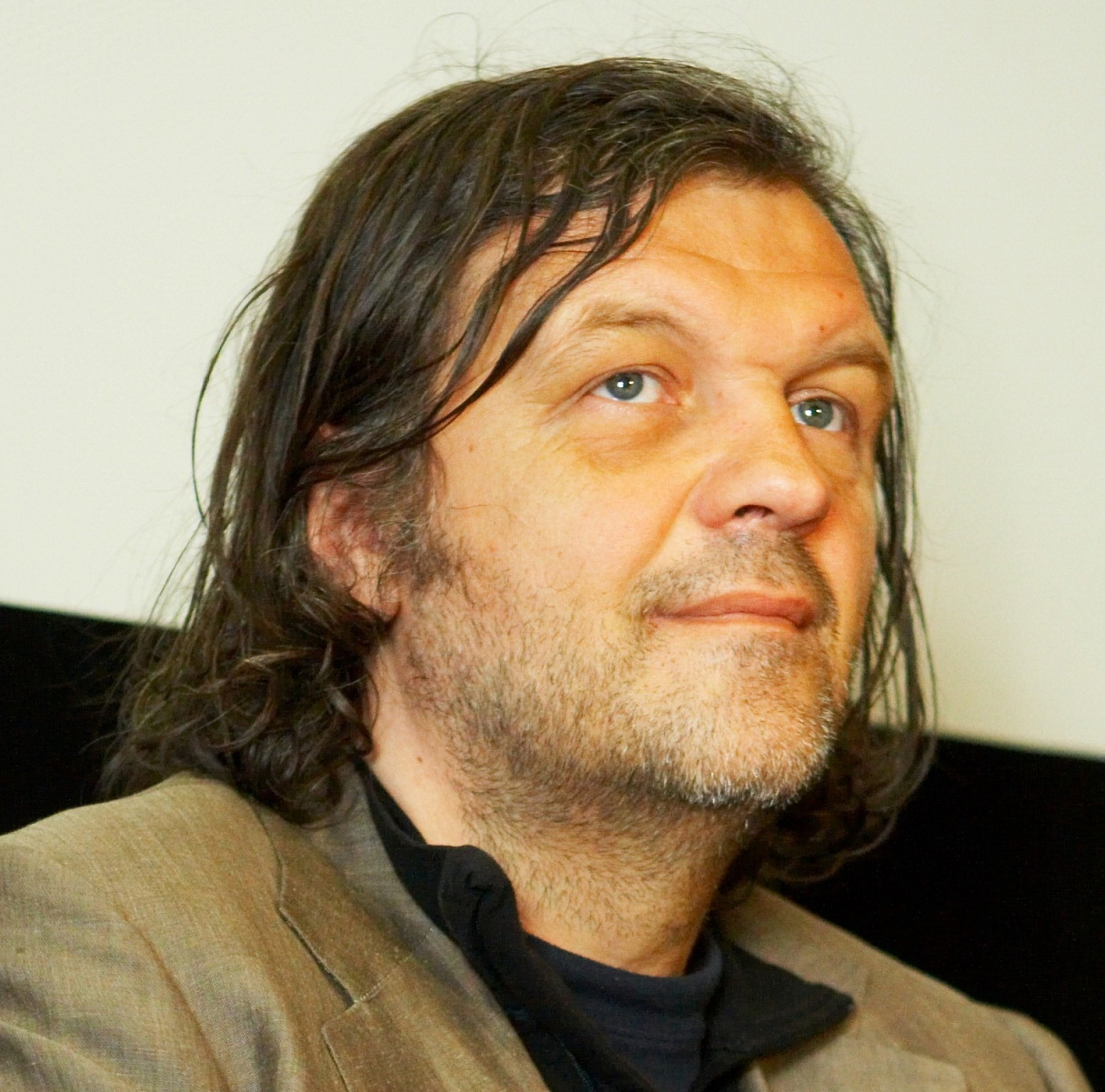
Emir Kusturica won for Arizona Dream (1993)

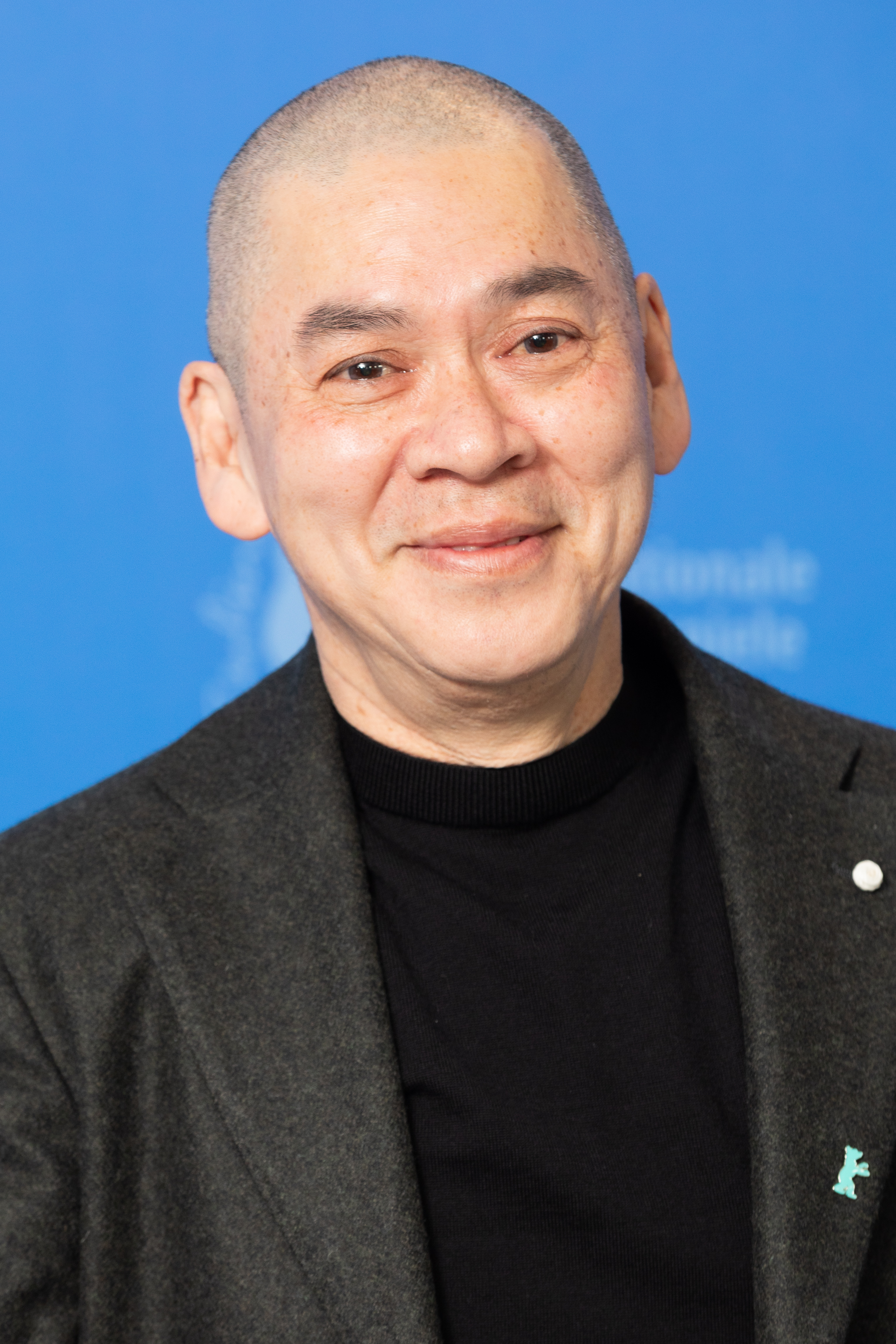
Tsai Ming-liang won for The River (1997)

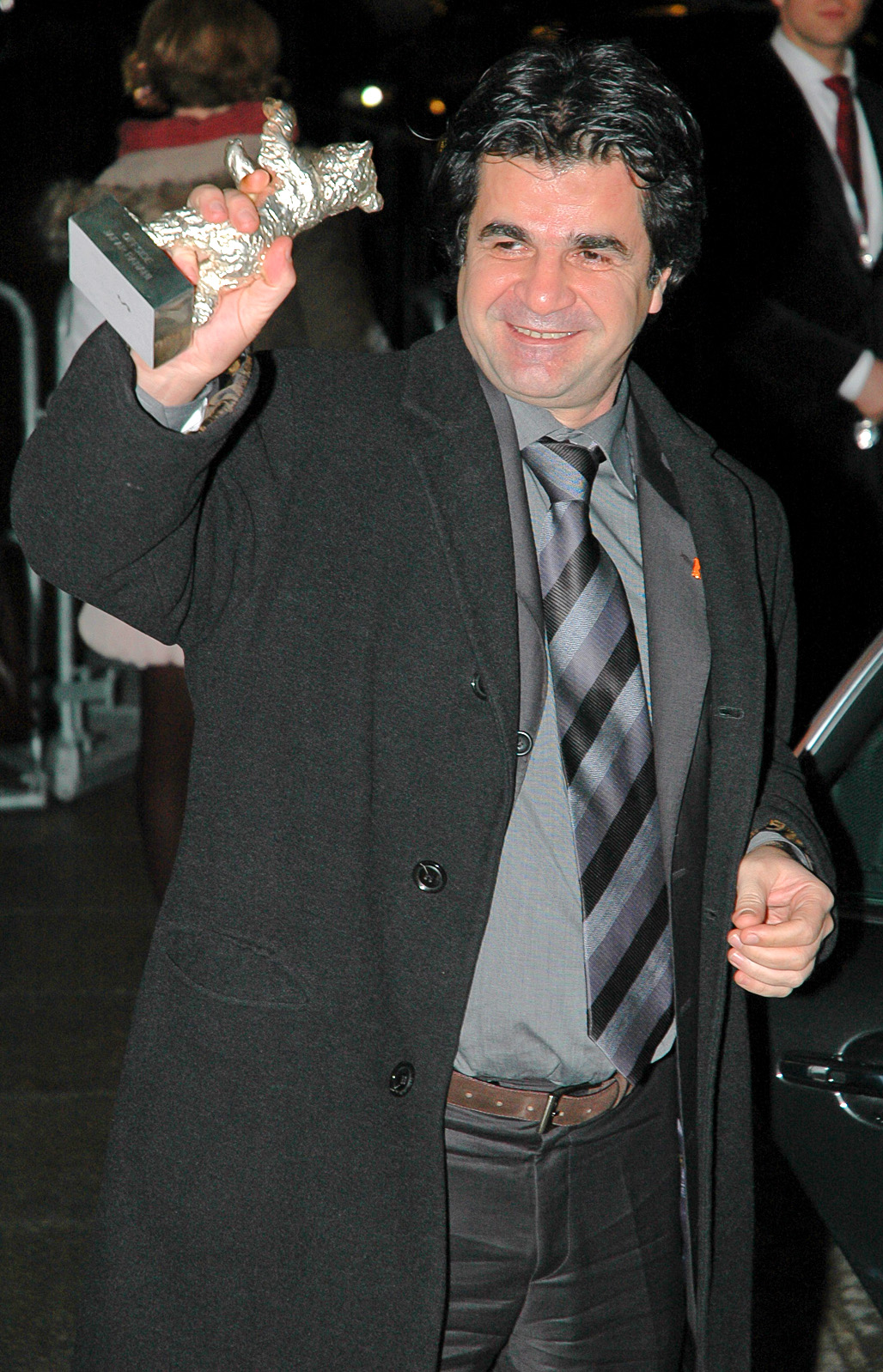
Jafar Panahi won for Offside (2006)

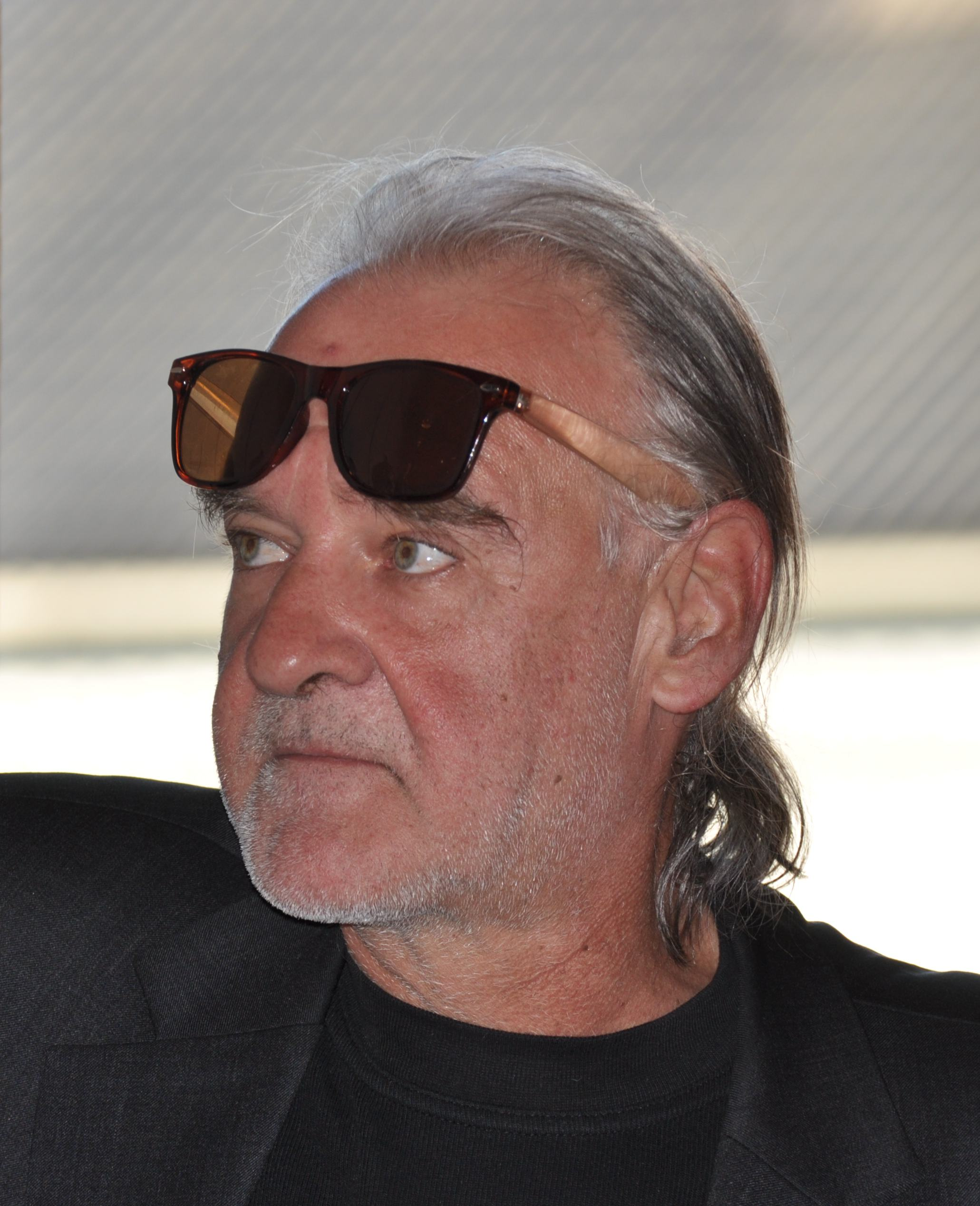
Béla Tarr won for The Turin Horse (2011)

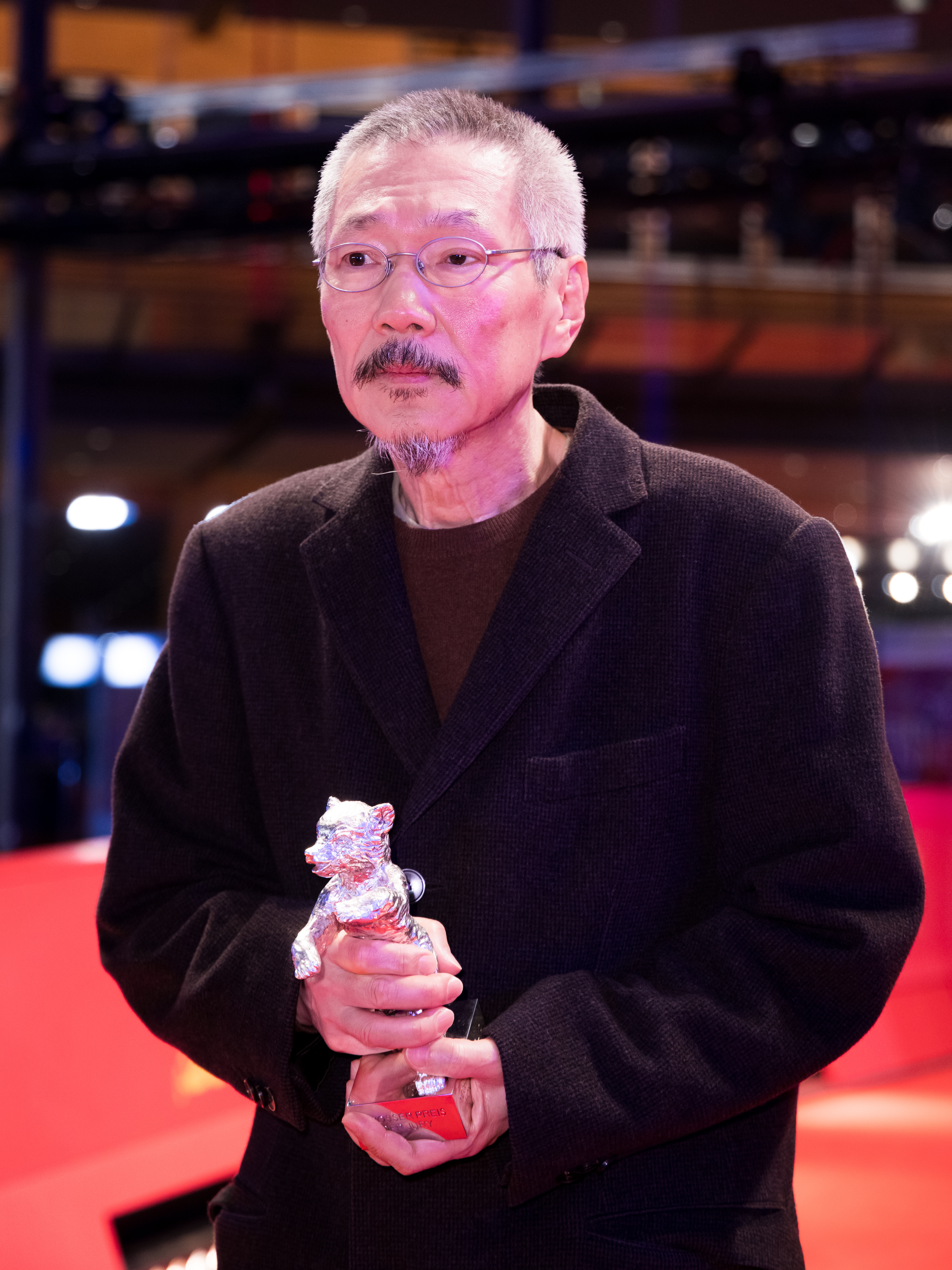
Hong Sang-soo won twice, for The Novelist's Film (2022) and A Traveler's Needs (2024)

=== 1960s ===
Year	English Title	Original Title	Director	Production Country
1965 (15th)	Le Bonheur		Agnès Varda	France
1965 (15th)	Repulsion		Roman Polanski	United Kingdom
1966 (16th)	The Chasers	Jakten	Yngve Gamlin	Sweden
1966 (16th)	No Shooting Time for Foxes	Schonzeit Für Füchse	Peter Schamoni	West Germany
1967 (17th)	La Collectionneuse		Éric Rohmer	France
1967 (17th)	Next Year, Same Time	Alle Jahre Wieder	Ulrich Schamoni	West Germany
1968 (18th)	Innocence Unprotected	Nevinost Bez Zastite	Dušan Makavejev	Yugoslavia
1968 (18th)	Signs of Life	Lebenszeichen	Werner Herzog	West Germany
1968 (18th)	Something Like Love	Come l'Amore	Enzo Muzii	Italy

=== 1970s ===
Year	English Title	Original Title	Director	Production Country
1970 (20th)	No awards given that year because of the controversy surrounding the participation in the main competition of director Michael Verhoeven's film o.k. that led to the resignation of the international jury before the festival ended			
1971 (21st)	The Decameron	Il Decameron	Pier Paolo Pasolini	Italy, France
1972 (22nd)	The Hospital		Arthur Hiller	United States
1973 (23rd)	There's No Smoke Without Fire	Il n'y a pas de fumée sans feu	André Cayatte	France, Italy
1974 (24th)	The Clockmaker	L'Horloger de Saint-Paul	Bertrand Tavernier	France
1975 (25th)	The Common Man	Dupont Lajoie	Yves Boisset	France
1975 (25th)	Overlord		Stuart Cooper	United Kingdom
1976 (26th)	Canoa: A Shameful Memory	Canoa: memoria de un hecho vergonzoso	Felipe Cazals	Mexico
1977 (27th)	The Devil, Probably	Le Diable, Probablement	Robert Bresson	France
1978 (28th)	A Queda		Ruy Guerra & Nelson Xavier	Brazil
1979 (29th)	Alexandria... Why?	إسكندرية ليه	Youssef Chahine	Egypt

=== 1980s ===
Year	English Title	Original Title	Director	Production Country
1980 (30th)	Seeking Asylum	Chiedo Asilo	Marco Ferreri	Italy, France
1981 (31st)	Akaler Shandhaney	আকালের সন্ধানে	Mrinal Sen	India
1982 (32nd)	Shivers	Dreszcze	Wojciech Marczewski	Poland
1983 (33rd)	A Season in Hakkari	Hakkâri'de Bir Mevsim	Erden Kıral	Turkey
1984 (34th)	Funny Dirty Little War	No Habrá más Penas ni Olvido	Héctor Olivera	Argentina
1985 (35th)	Flowers of Reverie	Szirmok, Virágok, Koszorúk	László Lugossy	Hungary
1986 (36th)	The Mass Is Ended	La Messa è Finita	Nanni Moretti	Italy
1987 (37th)	The Sea and Poison	海と毒薬	Kei Kumai	Japan
1988 (38th)	Commissar	Комиссар	Alexander Askoldow	Soviet Union
1989 (39th)	Evening Bell	晚鐘	Wu Ziniu	China

=== 1990s ===
Year	English Title	Original Title	Director	Production Country
1990 (40th)	The Asthenic Syndrome	Астенический синдром	Kira Muratova	Soviet Union
1991 (41st)	The Conviction	La Condanna	Marco Bellocchio	Italy
1991 (41st)	Satan	Сатана	Viktor Aristow	Soviet Union
1992 (42nd)	Sweet Emma, Dear Böbe	Édes Emma, Drága Böbe – Vázlatok, Aktok	István Szabó	Hungary
1993 (43rd)	Arizona Dream		Emir Kusturica	France, United States
1994 (44th)	Strawberry and Chocolate	Fresa y Chocolate	Tomás Gutiérrez Alea & Juan Carlos Tabío	Cuba, Mexico
1995 (45th)	Smoke		Wayne Wang	United States
1996 (46th)	All Things Fair	Lust och Fägring Stor	Bo Widerberg	Sweden, Denmark
1997 (47th)	The River	河流	Tsai Ming-liang	Taiwan
1998 (48th)	Wag the Dog		Barry Levinson	United States
1999 (49th)	Mifune's Last Song	Mifune	Søren Kragh-Jacobsen	Denmark, Sweden

=== 2000s ===
Year	English Title	Original Title	Director	Production Country
2000 (50th)	The Road Home	我的父亲母亲	Zhang Yimou	China
2001 (51st)	Beijing Bicycle	十七岁的单车	Wang Xiaoshuai	China, Taiwan, France
2002 (52nd)	Grill Point	Halbe Treppe	Andreas Dresen	Germany
2003 (53rd)	Adaptation		Spike Jonze	United States
2004 (54th)	Lost Embrace	El Abrazo Partido	Daniel Burman	Argentina, France, Spain
2005 (55th)	Peacock	孔雀	Gu Changwei	China
2006 (56th)	Offside	آفساید	Jafar Panahi	Iran
2006 (56th)	A Soap	En Soap	Pernille Fischer Christensen	Denmark, Sweden
2007 (57th)	The Other	El otro	Ariel Rotter	Argentina, France, Germany
2008 (58th)	Standard Operating Procedure		Errol Morris	United States
2009 (59th)	Everyone Else	Alle Anderen	Maren Ade	Germany
2009 (59th)	Giant	Gigante	Adrián Biniez	Uruguay, Argentina

=== 2010s ===
Year	English Title	Original Title	Director	Production Country
2010 (60th)	If I Want to Whistle, I Whistle	Eu Când Vreau să Fluier, Fluier	Florin Șerban	Romania
2011 (61st)	The Turin Horse	A torinói ló	Béla Tarr	Hungary
2012 (62nd)	Just the Wind	Csak a szél	Benedek Fliegauf	Hungary
2013 (63rd)	An Episode in the Life of an Iron Picker	Epizoda u životu berača željeza	Danis Tanović	Bosnia and Herzegovina, Slovenia, France
2014 (64th)	The Grand Budapest Hotel		Wes Anderson	United States, Germany
2015 (65th)	The Club	El Club	Pablo Larraín	Chile
2016 (66th)	Death in Sarajevo	Smrt u Sarajevu	Danis Tanović	Bosnia and Herzegovina, France
2017 (67th)	Félicité		Alain Gomis	Senegal, France
2018 (68th)	Mug	Twarz	Małgorzata Szumowska	Poland
2019 (69th)	By the Grace of God	Grâce à Dieu	François Ozon	France

=== 2020s ===
Year	English Title	Original Title	Director	Production Country
2020 (70th)	Never Rarely Sometimes Always		Eliza Hittman	United States
2021 (71st)	Wheel of Fortune and Fantasy	偶然と想像	Ryusuke Hamaguchi	Japan
2022 (72nd)	The Novelist's Film	소설가의 영화	Hong Sang-soo	South Korea
2023 (73rd)	Afire	Roter Himmel	Christian Petzold	Germany
2024 (74th)	A Traveler's Needs	여행자의 필요	Hong Sang-soo	South Korea
2025 (75th)	The Blue Trail	O Último Azul	Gabriel Mascaro	Brazil, Mexico, Chile, Netherlands
2026 (76th)	Salvation	Kurtuluş	Emin Alper	Turkey, France, Netherlands, Greece, Sweden, Saudi Arabia
