= The General of the Dead Army (film) =

1983 film

- Directed by: Luciano Tovoli
- Written by: Jean-Claude Carrière; Ismail Kadare; Michel Piccoli; Luciano Tovoli
- Based on: The General of the Dead Army by Ismail Kadare
- Starring: Marcello Mastroianni
- Cinematography: Giuseppe Tinelli; Luciano Tovoli
- Edited by: Jennifer Augé
- Release date: 19 October 1983
- Running time: 105 minutes
- Country: Italy
- Language: Italian

The General of the Dead Army (Italian: Il generale dell'armata morta) is a 1983 Italian drama film directed by Luciano Tovoli and based on the 1963 novel by Albanian author Ismail Kadare.

== Cast ==
- Marcello Mastroianni as General Ariosto
- Anouk Aimée as Countess Betsy Mirafiore
- Michel Piccoli as Benetandi
- Gérard Klein as General Krotz
- Sergio Castellitto as The Expert
- Daniele Dublino as The Minister
- Carmine De Padova as L'ordonnance
- Roberto Miccoli as The Shepherd
- Cosimo Calabrese as The President
- Salvatore Buccolieri as The Old Man
- Vincenza D'Angela as The Woman

== Reception ==
Paolo Mereghetti praised the film as "a story that runs counter to the myth of "Italians as good people." A fine debut... by Tovoli."

== See also ==
- The Return of the Dead Army (Albanian: Kthimi i Ushtrise se Vdekur), a 1989 Albanian film starring Bujar Lako, based on the novel and directed by Dhimitër Anagnosti
- Life and Nothing But (La Vie et rien d’autre), a 1989 French film starring Philippe Noiret, based on the novel and directed by Bertrand Tavernier.
