= Luciano Tovoli =

Italian cinematographer

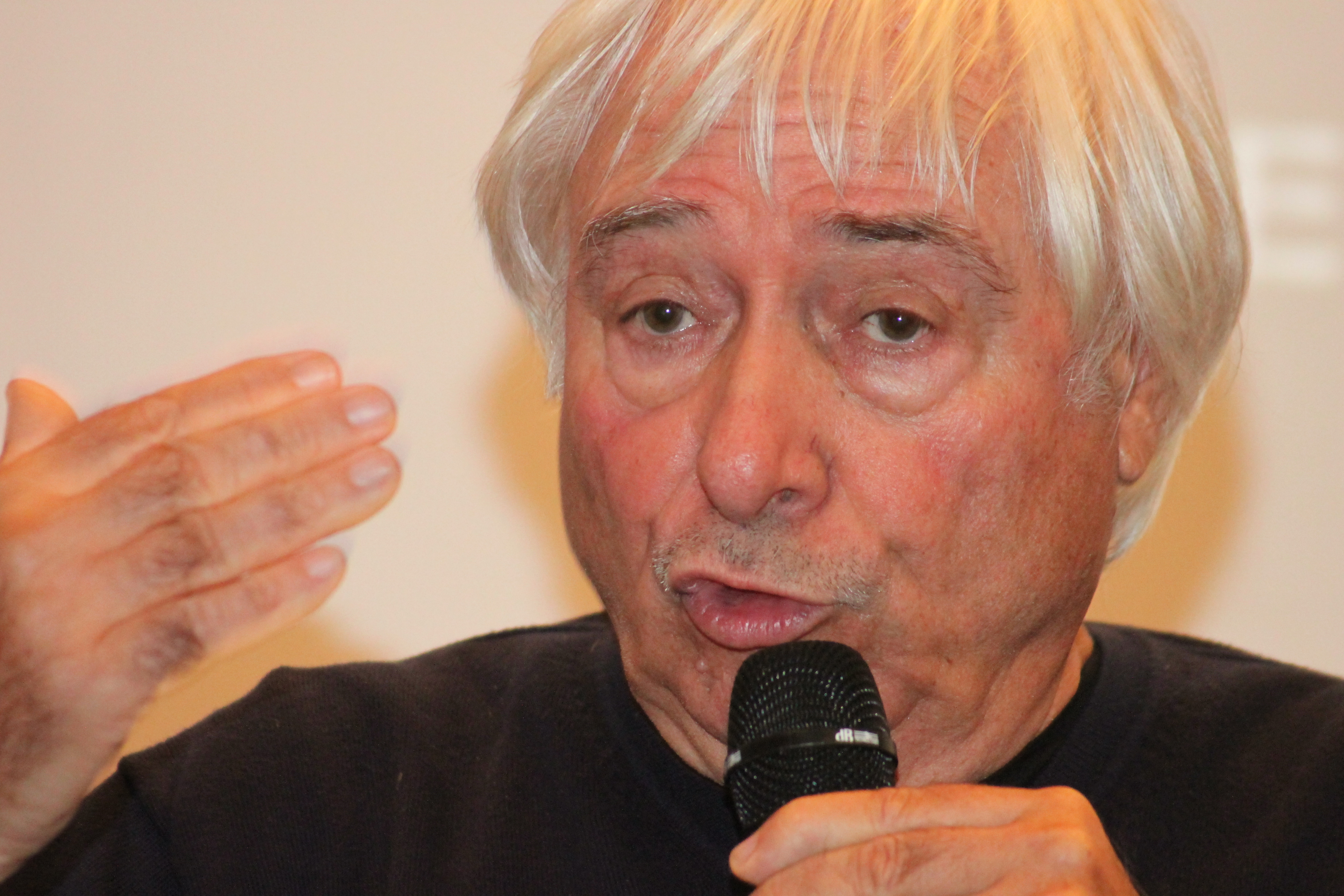
- Tovoli at the Manaki Brothers Film Festival in Bitola, North Macedonia, September 2012
- Born: 30 October 1936 (age 89); Massa Marittima, Province of Grosseto, Kingdom of Italy
- Education: University of Pisa; Centro Sperimentale di Cinematografia
- Occupations: Cinematographer; film director; film producer; screenwriter
- Years active: 1961–present
- Organizations: American Society of Cinematographers (ASC); Italian Society of Cinematographic Photography Authors (AIC)

Luciano Tovoli ASC AIC (Italian pronunciation: [luˈtʃaːno ˈtoːvoli]; born 30 October 1936) is an Italian cinematographer and filmmaker. With a career spanning over five decades, he is considered one of Italy's premier cinematographers, collaborating with numerous acclaimed filmmakers such as Michelangelo Antonioni, Francis Veber, Dario Argento, Ettore Scola, Andrei Tarkovsky, and Julie Taymor.

Films that Tovoli has photographed include The Passenger (1975), Suspiria (1977), Titus (1999). He has been a longtime collaborator of Barbet Schroeder, having worked with the Iranian-born filmmaker's Reversal of Fortune (1990), Single White Female (1992), Before and After (1996), Murder by Numbers (2002), and Inju: The Beast in the Shadow (2008). He is a member of the American, Italian Society of Cinematographers, and an honorary member of the Swedish Society of Cinematographers and the European Federation of Cinematographers.

In 1983, Tovoli directed and cowrote Il Generale dell'armata morte based on a novel by Ismail Kadare, starring Marcello Mastroianni and Anouk Aimée.

== Filmography ==
=== 1960s ===
Year	Film	Director	Notes
1968	Something Like Love	Enzo Muzii	Nominated - Nastro d'Argento for Best Cinematography
1969	The Uninvited	Vittorio De Seta	
1969	Four Came to Kill Sartana	Demofilo Fidani	

=== 1970s ===
Year	Film	Director	Notes
1970	Rose Spot	Enzo Muzii	
1970	Tulips of Haarlem	Franco Brusati	
1971	Io non spezzo... rompo	Bruno Corbucci	
1971	Down with Your Hands... You Scum!	Demofilo Fidani	Co-cinematographer with Franco Villa
1972	We Won't Grow Old Together	Maurice Pialat	
1972	Chung Kuo, Cina	Michelangelo Antonioni	
1972	La vita in gioco	Gianfranco Mingozzi	
1973	Dirty Weekend	Dino Risi	
1973	Bread and Chocolate	Franco Brusati	
1974	The Peaceful Age	Fabio Carpi	
1975	Mistress of the Devil	Juan Luis Buñuel	
1975	L'altro Dio	Elio Bartolini	
1975	The Passenger	Michelangelo Antonioni	Won - Nastro d'Argento for Best Cinematography
1975	Weak Spot	Peter Fleischmann	
1975	The Sunday Woman	Luigi Comencini	
1975	Snapshot of a Crime	Mario Imperoli	
1976	The Last Woman	Marco Ferreri	
1976	The Desert of the Tartars	Valerio Zurlini	
1977	This Is the Night	Carlo Di Carlo	
1977	Suspiria	Dario Argento	
1978	Behind Convent Walls	Walerian Borowczyk	
1978	Noccioline a colazione	Mario Orfini	
1978	Bye Bye Monkey	Marco Ferreri	
1978	Where Are You Going on Holiday?	Mauro Bolognini	Segment: "Sarò tutta per te"

=== 1980s ===
Year	Film	Director	Notes
1980	In the Pope's Eye	Renzo Arbore	
1980	The Mystery of Oberwald	Michelangelo Antonioni	
1981	Bianco, rosso e Verdone	Carlo Verdone	
1982	The Roaring Forties	Christian de Chalonge	
1982	Beyond the Door	Liliana Cavani	
1982	Tenebrae	Dario Argento	
1983	Voyage in Time	Tonino Guerra; Andrei Tarkovsky	
1983	The General of the Dead Army	—N/a	Also director Nominated - CIFF Gold Hugo for Best Feature
1984	Sweet Body of Bianca	Nanni Moretti	
1985	Fracchia contro Dracula	Neri Parenti	
1985	Police	Maurice Pialat	
1985	La Cage aux Folles 3: The Wedding	Georges Lautner	
1986	Les Fugitifs	Francis Veber	
1987	Da grande	Franco Amurri	
1988	Priceless Beauty	Charles Finch	
1989	Splendor	Ettore Scola	Nominated - David di Donatello for Best Cinematography; Won - Nastro d'Argento for Best Cinematography
1989	What Time Is It?	Ettore Scola	Nominated - David di Donatello for Best Cinematography
1989	Vanille fraise	Gérard Oury	

=== 1990s ===
Year	Film	Director	Notes
1990	Captain Fracassa's Journey	Ettore Scola	Won - David di Donatello for Best Cinematography
1990	Reversal of Fortune	Barbet Schroeder	Nominated - Nastro d'Argento for Best Cinematography
1992	Jackpot	Mario Orfini	
1992	Single White Female	Barbet Schroeder	
1993	Mario, Maria and Mario	Ettore Scola	
1994	Monkey Trouble	Franco Amurri	
1994	The Teddy Bear	Jacques Deray	
1995	Kiss of Death	Barbet Schroeder	
1996	Before and After	Barbet Schroeder	
1996	Le Jaguar	Francis Veber	
1998	Desperate Measures	Barbet Schroeder	
1998	The Dinner Game	Francis Veber	
1999	Deceit	Claudia Florio	
1999	Titus	Julie Taymor	

=== 2000s ===
Year	Film	Director	Notes
2001	La Regina Degli Scacchi	Claudia Florio	
2001	The Closet	Francis Veber	
2002	I Love You Eugenio	Francisco José Fernandez	
2002	Murder by Numbers	Barbet Schroeder	
2003	Ruby & Quentin	Francis Veber	
2007	Hidden Love	Alessandro Capone	
2008	Inju: The Beast in the Shadow	Barbet Schroeder	
2009	Oceans	Jacques Perrin; Jacques Cluzaud	Co-cinematographer with Philippe Ros, David Reichert, Valérie Le Gurun, René Heuzey, Laurent Fleutot, Luc Drion, Simon Christidis & Michel Benjamin Nominated - Cinema Eye Honors Award for Outstanding Achievement in Cinematography

=== 2010s ===
Year	Film	Director	Notes
2010	Natale in Sudafrica	Neri Parenti	
2011	Amici miei - Come tutto ebbe inizio	Neri Parenti	
2012	Dracula 3D	Dario Argento	
2013	How Strange to Be Named Federico	Ettore Scola	Nominated - Globo d'Oro for Best Cinematography; Won - Special Silver Ribbon Award
2015	Amnesia	Barbet Schroeder	
2016	Un Juif pour l'exemple	Jacob Berger	
2017	False Confessions	Luc Bondy; Marie-Louise Bischofberger	
2017	Il padre di mia figlia	Carloalberto Biazzi	Short film
