= Giulia Boschi =

Italian film and television actress

- Born: 17 December 1962 (age 63); Rome, Italy
- Occupations: Film and television actress

Giulia Boschi (born 17 December 1962) is an Italian film and television actress.

== Life and career ==
Born in Rome, Boschi is the daughter of the television presenter Aba Cercato. She made her film debut in 1984, in Francesca Comencini's Pianoforte, and for this performance she was awarded as best actress at the Rio de Janeiro Film Festival. She was also awarded a Silver Ribbon for best new actress. In 1988 she won the Ciak d'oro for best supporting actress in Da grande.

== Filmography ==
Year	Title	Role	Notes
1984	Pianoforte	Maria	
1985	Secrets Secrets	Rosa	
1987	Italian Night	Daria	
1987	The Sicilian	Giovanna Ferra	
1987	Da Grande	Francesca	
1988	Chocolat	Aimée Dalens	
1988	The Camels	Anna	
1989	Singolo		
1990	Atto di dolore	Martina	
1993	Bonus malus	Valeria	
1995	L'uomo proiettile	La donna barbuta	
1997	Porzûs	Ada Zambon	
