= Pianoforte (1984 film) =

1984 Italian drama film

- Directed by: Francesca Comencini
- Written by: Francesca Comencini; Vincenzo Cerami
- Starring: Giulia Boschi
- Cinematography: Armando Nannuzzi
- Music by: Guido & Maurizio De Angelis
- Release date: 1984
- Language: Italian

Pianoforte is a 1984 Italian drama film. It is the debut film of director Francesca Comencini. Pianoforte won the "De Sica" award at the 1984 Venice Film Festival.

For her performance Giulia Boschi, at her film debut, was awarded as best actress at the Rio de Janeiro Film Festival and won a Silver Ribbon for best new actress.

== Cast ==
- Giulia Boschi as Maria
- François Siener as Paolo
- Giovannella Grifeo as Alessandra
- Karl Zinny as Robertino
- Marie-Christine Barrault as Maria's mother
- Antonio Piovanelli as the Doctor
- Roberto Bonanni as Andrea

== Production ==
The film is loosely based on the autobiographical experiences of the director, depicting her relationship with journalist Carlo Rivolta (1949 –1982) and their struggles with heroin addiction.

== Reception ==
Italian critic Tullio Kezich noted: "Viewers are touched by an often painful sincerity, which contrasts with the film's overly polished execution".
