= Innocence Unprotected =

- Directed by: Dušan Makavejev
- Written by: Dušan Makavejev
- Starring: Dragoljub Aleksić; Ana Milosavljević; Vera Jovanović; Bratoljub Gligorijević
- Cinematography: Stevan Miskovic; Branko Perak
- Edited by: Ivanka Vukasović
- Music by: Vojislav Kostić
- Release date: 1968
- Running time: 78 minutes
- Country: Yugoslavia
- Language: Serbo-Croatian

Innocence Unprotected (Serbo-Croatian: Nevinost bez zaštite, Serbian Cyrillic: Невиност без заштите) is a compilation film by Yugoslav director Dušan Makavejev. Makavejev's film is based on Dragoljub Aleksić's 1942 film of the same title that was never released. In 1968, Makavejev established the film and expanded it with newsreel footage and interviews with surviving cast members.

== Cast ==
- Dragoljub Aleksić as himself, acrobat (director, producer)
- Bratoljub Gligorijević as Mr. Petrović
- Vera Jovanović-Šegović as stepmother
- Ana Milosavljević as Nada, orphan
- Pera Milosavljević as houseboy
- Ivan Živković as brother of the acrobat (coproducer)
- Milan Tošić as police officer
- Toško Vlajić as police officer
- Ruža Protić as troupe member
- Stevan Mišković (sound and image editor)

== Production ==
Innocence Unprotected is composed of footage of the 1942 film of the same name. Innocence Unprotected was originally filmed in 1942 under the title Nevinost bez zaštite which was meant to be the first sound feature film made in Serbia. Nevinost bez zaštite was made by the Yugoslav gymnast Dragoljub Aleksić, who wrote, produced, directed, and starred in the film. Nevinost bez zaštite was never released due to Nazi censorship, while later during the Yugoslav communist period some ironically accused and condemned it as being pro-Nazi.

In 1968 filmmaker Dušan Makavejev found the film and expanded upon it with newsreel footage of Nazi propaganda and German occupation as well. Other footage includes Aleksić performing his acrobatics and filmed interviews of the surviving cast members. Makavejev tinted some of the black and white scenes in the film and hand colored some details. The film was referred to by Makavejev as a "montage of attractions", with a montage styled celebration of Serbian customs, folklore, and humor.

== Reception ==
The film was entered into the 1968 Berlin International Film Festival, and it won the Silver Bear Extraordinary Prize of the Jury.

The film received positive acclaim on its initial release. Variety wrote that the film is "both amusing and interesting. It has value as a documentary but it also gives the viewer the chance to laugh at an old amateur feature pic".

Roger Greenspun of The New York Times wrote that Makavejev "brings an exceptionally sophisticated understanding to his project. But it is also an exceptionally understanding sophistication—ironic, loving, clear-sightedly appreciative of all illusions. For this, rarer than most things on film, I value Makavejev's extraordinary insights into ordinary affairs and his gentle juggling act with Acrobat Aleksic."

Later reviews were also positive. In 1985, Don Druker of The Chicago Reader wrote that the film is a "funny and genuinely endearing tribute to an innocent folk hero—bizarre in spots, and definitely Makavejev".

On the review aggregator website Rotten Tomatoes, 100% of 9 critics' reviews are positive, with an average rating of 8.1/10.

== Legacy ==
The Yugoslav Film Archive, in accordance with its authorities based on the Law on Cultural Heritage, declared one hundred Serbian feature films (1911–1999) as cultural heritage of great importance on December 28, 2016. Innocence Unprotected is also on that list.
