= Da grande (film) =

1987 Italian film

- Theatrical release poster
- Directed by: Franco Amurri
- Written by: Franco Amurri; Stefano Sudriè
- Produced by: Achille Manzotti
- Starring: Renato Pozzetto; Giulia Boschi; Alessandro Haber; Ottavia Piccolo
- Cinematography: Luciano Tovoli
- Edited by: Raimondo Crociani
- Music by: Pino Massara
- Release date: 23 December 1987
- Running time: 94 minutes
- Country: Italy
- Language: Italian

Da grande is a 1987 Italian comedy film directed by Franco Amurri, starring Renato Pozzetto, Ottavia Piccolo and Alessandro Haber.

Da grande is one of the coming-of-age comedies released in the late 1980s. It has been claimed to be the inspiration for Big, the 1988 international blockbuster directed by Penny Marshall and starring Tom Hanks.

== Plot ==
Eight-year-old Marco Marinelli is a bedwetter, scolded by his mother (Ottavia Piccolo) and teased by his classmates. On his birthday, he finds out that his father (Alessandro Haber), who is facing economic difficulties, has not brought him the Lego he was promised. He runs in tears to his room and puts all his heart into wishing he were big and not subject to these indignities. As a result, he bursts through his clothes in the guise of a forty-year-old man (Renato Pozzetto) and seeks refuge in the house of his schoolteacher Francesca (Giulia Boschi), who he is secretly in love with. Mentally, he is still eight years old, and it is a puzzle what to do with him, until someone discovers that he has an uncanny rapport with children. He then becomes a full-time and highly requested babysitter, but shortly after he is suspected of abducting the by-now long-missing child Marco. He then runs out of money, and fakes the kidnapping of himself, but while chased by the police he eventually turns back into the eight-year-old boy. Back in his classroom, he hands in a letter to Francesca, who upon realising the boy and man were one uses the magic to join him as a little girl.

== Cast ==
- Renato Pozzetto as grown-up Marco
- Ioska Versari as normal Marco
- Giulia Boschi as Francesca (Marco's teacher)
- Alessandro Haber as Claudio (Marco's father)
- Ottavia Piccolo as Anna (Marco's mother)
- Alessandro Partexano as the police detective
- Giampiero Bianchi as Nicola (Marco's uncle)
- Gaia Piras as Silvietta (Marco's sister)
- Ilary Blasi as the girl playing hide-and-seek

== Reception ==
Da grande won the Nastro d'Argento (Silver Ribbon) for Best Story, the oldest movie award in Europe, assigned since 1946 by Sindacato Nazionale dei Giornalisti Cinematografici Italiani (the association of Italian film critics).
