= Inju: The Beast in the Shadow =

- Poster
- Directed by: Barbet Schroeder
- Written by: Eitan Arrusi; Jean-Armand Bougrelle; Frédérique Henri; Barbet Schroeder; Edogawa Rampo (novel Inju)
- Produced by: Vérane Frédiani; Franck Ribière; Saïd Ben Saïd
- Starring: Benoît Magimel; Lika Minamoto; Shun Sugata
- Cinematography: Luciano Tovoli
- Edited by: Luc Barnier
- Music by: Jorge Arriagada
- Distributed by: UGC International
- Release dates: August 2008 (Venice); 3 September 2008 (France)
- Running time: 105 minutes
- Country: France
- Languages: French; Japanese
- Budget: €10.3 million
- Box office: $676,097

Inju: The Beast in the Shadow (French: Inju, la bête dans l'ombre) is a 2008 film directed by Barbet Schroeder. It stars Benoît Magimel and Lika Minamoto and was filmed on location in Tokyo.

The film is based on a 1928 novel by Japanese writer Edogawa Rampo. The novel has been published in English by Penguin Random House under the title Beast in the Shadows.

Inju: The Beast in the Shadow premiered at the Venice Film Festival in August 2008, followed by the Toronto International Film Festival in September, 2008. The film was released in France on September 3, 2008.

== Plot ==
The writer and college professor, Alexandre Fayard, researches and gives lectures about the gruesome literary work of the mysterious Japanese writer Shundei Oe, considered by him to be the master of manipulation. In his underground detective novels, evil always prevails and Shundei Oe has never allowed anyone to see his face. His only image available is a frightening picture on the back of his best-sellers.

Alex travels to Kyoto to promote his successful detective story, that follows the same style of the Shundei Oe, but with a positive message instead. He meets with his publisher, Ken Honda, from the publishing house Hakubunkan, and a geisha who knew the writer. After these finds in his investigation, Alex becomes more determined to find the mysterious writer.

== Critical response ==
Critical reaction to the film after its Venice premiere was mostly negative. Geoffrey Macnab wrote:

Inju, the Beast in the Shadow is a bold but arguably misguided affair....[I]t is pitched somewhere between a B-thriller and Nagisa Oshima's In the Realm of the Senses. Corny plot twists, transgressive sex and self-reflexive asides about cinema sit side by side. Many in Venice found it preposterous and it was given a rough ride by the volatile Italian press.
