= Something Like Love =

1968 film

- Directed by: Enzo Muzii
- Written by: Enzo Muzii; Tommaso Chiaretti; Ludovica Ripa di Meana
- Produced by: Enzo Muzii
- Starring: Alfred Lynch
- Cinematography: Luciano Tovoli
- Release date: 1968
- Running time: 84 minutes
- Country: Italy
- Language: Italian

Something Like Love (Italian: Come l'amore) is a 1968 Italian drama film directed by Enzo Muzii. It was entered into the 18th Berlin International Film Festival where it won the Silver Bear Extraordinary Prize of the Jury.

== Cast ==
- Alfred Lynch
- Anna Maria Guarnieri
- Giuseppe Salierno
- Valentino Esposito
- Paul Theodore Flynn
- Valentino Macchi
- Giulio Mascoli
- Gioia Ramaglia
- Barbara Ruffo
