= Ambrogio Fogar =

Italian sailor, writer, and rally driver

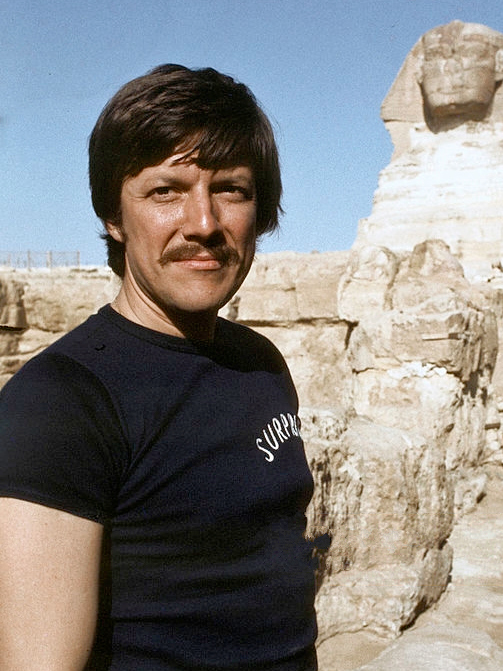
- Ambrogio Fogar in Egypt in 1975
- Born: Ambrogio Fogar; 13 August 1941; Milan, Italy
- Died: 24 August 2005 (aged 64); Milan, Italy
- Occupations: sailor, writer, rally driver, all-round adventurer and television presenter
- Spouse: Maria Teresa Panizzoli (m. 1971; div. 1985)
- Partner: Katalin Szijarto (1985–24 August 2005)
- Children: Rachele Fogar; Francesca Fogar
- Website: Official website

Ambrogio Fogar (Italian pronunciation: [ˈfɔːɡar]; 13 August 1941 – 24 August 2005) was an Italian sailor, writer, rally driver, adventurer, and television presenter. He was a Commander of the Order of Merit of the Italian Republic, gold medal for athletic value, gold medal for marine value, gold medal to memory and other.

== Biography ==
His exploits included a number of successful long-distance sailing feats, such as becoming the first Italian to sail single-handedly from east to west around the world, starting and ending his journey in Castiglione della Pescaia, Tuscany. In 1978, after being capsized by orcas, he survived more than ten weeks in a life raft in the South Atlantic along with a friend, journalist Mauro Mancini, who died of pneumonia two days after the two were rescued. Another venture was Fogar's solo sled expedition to the North Pole. He competed several times in the Dakar Rally and in the Rallye des Pharaons.

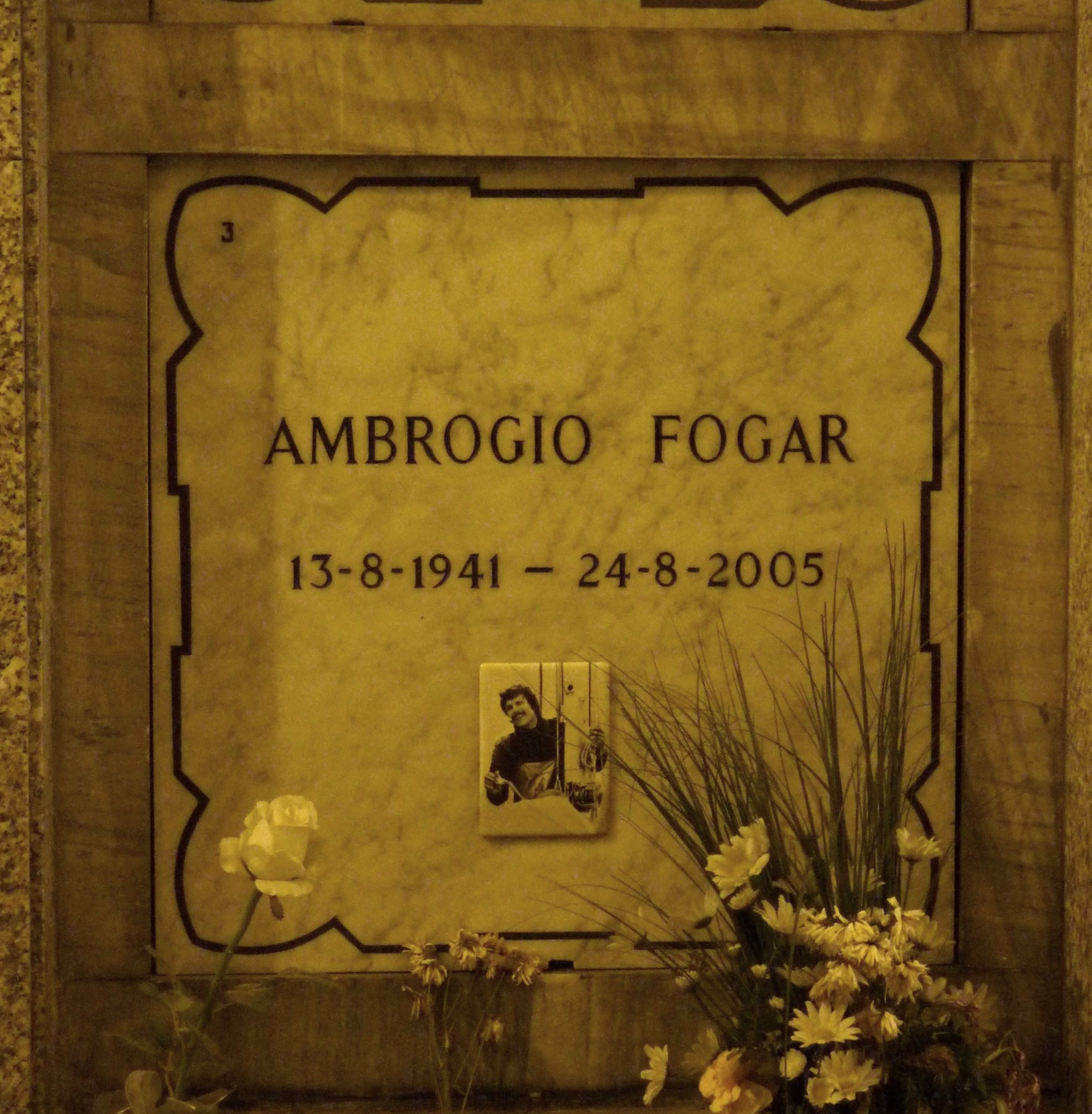
Fogar's grave at the Monumental Cemetery of Milan in 2015

In 1992, Fogar was paralyzed from the neck down following a jeep accident while rallying in Turkmenistan. This did not end his adventurous spirit, and in 1997, in a wheelchair, he competed in a round-Italy yacht race.

He died in 2005 of a heart attack and is buried at the Monumental Cemetery of Milan, Italy.

== Personal life ==
Fogar was the father of Rachele and Francesca Fogar. Rachele Fogar was born in Milan on 31 July 1991 and Francesca Fogar was born in Tradate on 17 November 1975.

== Television ==
- Jonathan - Dimensione avventura (Canale 5, 1984–1986; Italia 1, 1986–1991)
- Antologia di Jonathan (Canale 5, 1984–1986; Italia 1, 1986–1991)
- Parliamone - talk of Buongiorno Italia (Canale 5, 1987–1988)
- Campo base - Il mondo dell'avventura (TV Koper-Capodistria/Canale 5, 1989–1991; TELE+2, 1990–1991)
- Speciale campo base (TV Koper-Capodistria/Canale 5, 1989–1991; TELE+2, 1990–1991)

== Radio documentary ==
- Poli Mirabilia - La marcia sul pack e altre meraviglie (Rai Radio 1, 1984)

== Documentary ==
- Ambrogio Fogar - il viaggio (Italia 1, 1998)
- Ambrogio Fogar, l'ultimo eroe (Rete 4, 2005)

== Books ==
- Il mio Atlantico. 1972: transatalantica in solitario Plymouth-Newport; 1973: seconda regata atlantica Cape Town-Rio de Janeiro. Milan: Bietti. 1973.
- 400 giorni intorno al mondo. Milan: Rizzoli. 1975.
- Messaggi in bottiglia. Da un catamarano in mezzo all'Atlantico. OSTAR,'76. Legnano: Landoni. 1976.
- L'ultima leggenda. Milan: Rizzoli. 1977.
- La zattera. Milan: Rizzoli. 1978.
- Il giro del mondo del Surprise. Milan: Epipress-Famiglia cristiana. 1978.
- Sulle tracce di Marco Polo. Milan: A. Mondadori. 1983.
- Verso il Polo con Armaduk. Milan: Rizzoli. 1983. ISBN 88-17-85369-0.
- Solo. La forza di vivere. Milan: A. Mondadori. 1997. ISBN 88-04-40392-6.
- Contro vento. La mia avventura più grande. Milan: Rizzoli. 2005. ISBN 88-17-00664-5.
- Quando c'era Superman. L'ultima avventura di una vita controvento. Casale Monferrato: Piemme. 2006. ISBN 88-384-8651-4.

== See also ==
- List of solved missing person cases (1970s)
