= Aba Cercato =

Italian television presenter and actress

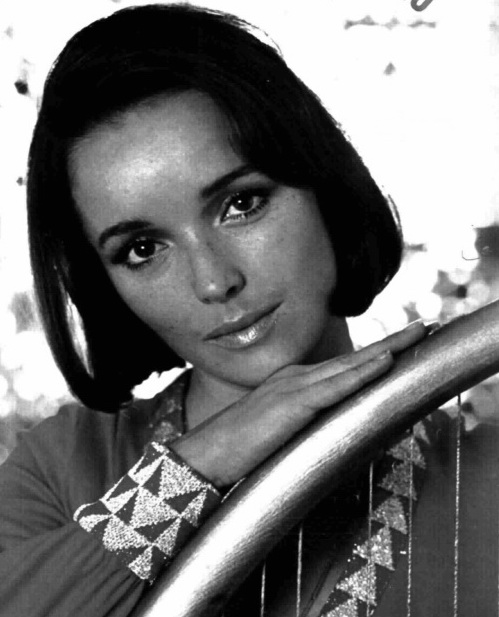
- Born: 1 May 1939 (age 87); Bologna, Italy
- Occupation: Actress

Aba Cercato presents the Golden Gondola to Riccardo Del Turco for "Luglio" at the 1969 International Festival of Light Music.

Aba Cercato (born 1 May 1939) is an Italian former television presenter and announcer.

== Life and career ==
Born in Bologna, Cercato joined RAI in 1959 as announcer. In 1961, she was the first announcer of Rai 2 and inaugurated its broadcasting service. Starting from the mid-1960s, she hosted several programs of various genres, ranging from music to medicine, politics, current events, and entertainment. In 1983 she left RAI to join Canale 5, where she presented the morning programs Buongiorno Italia and Come stai?.

She is the mother of actress Giulia Boschi.
