= Krek (film) =

Krek (1968) is an animated film by Croatian animator Borivoj Dovniković. The film won the Silver Bear at the Berlin Film Festival that year. The story concerns a soldier whose dreary life in military service is bettered by his companionship with a magical frog.
