= Enzo Muzii =

Italian film director, writer and photographer

- Born: 13 January 1926; Asmara, Eritrea
- Died: 2 February 2014 (aged 88); Velletri, Italy
- Occupation: Writer

Enzo Muzii (13 January 1926 – 2 February 2014) was an Italian film and television director, writer and photographer.

== Life and career ==
After graduating in law, Muzii started his career as a film critic for L'Unità. In the early 1960s he collaborated with Cesare Zavattini in the films Latin Lovers and The Mysteries of Rome, before focusing in photography.

In 1968, Muzii made his feature film debut with Something Like Love, which won the Jury Grand Prix at the Berlin International Film Festival; his following film, Rose Spot, was a semi-autobiographical reflection on his activity of photographer. Starting with the miniseries Origins of the Mafia (1976), he focused on television.

Muzii has been described as "a rare figure because he is, in a way, a specialist in everything. He was a political journalist who rejected politics, a photographer who debated photography, a demanding filmmaker who adored cinema and abandoned it, a writer who dropped books, like alms in our saucer, one every ten years".

== Selected works ==
- Punto di non ritorno, Adelphi, Milano, 1990
- Silenzio, si vive: romanzo di profilo, Aragno, Torino, 2003
- Fuori dai giochi: tre storie, Aragno, Torino, 2005, vincitore del Premio II Ceppo nel 2006
- Il tempo parlerà, Aragno, Torino, 2006
