= Franco Amurri =

Italian filmmaker

- Born: 12 September 1958 (age 68); Rome, Italy
- Occupations: Film director; producer; screenwriter
- Spouse: Heide Lund
- Partner: Susan Sarandon (1984–1988)
- Children: 3, including Eva
- Parent: Antonio Amurri (father)

Franco Amurri (born 12 September 1958) is an Italian film director, producer and screenwriter, best known for directing films such as Da grande, which inspired the Tom Hanks film Big, Monkey Trouble and Flashback.

His father was the author and television writer Antonio Amurri. He has a daughter, Eva Amurri, with actress Susan Sarandon. He is married to Heide Lund, a sometime actress and producer with whom he has two children: son Leone and daughter Augusta. He also has two stepdaughters, Tallulah and Ruby, from Lund's previous marriage to Lord Antony Rufus Isaacs, son of Margot Rufus Isaacs, Marchioness of Reading.

== Filmography ==
=== Feature films ===
- Il ragazzo del Pony Express (1986)
- Da grande (1987)
- Flashback (1990)
- Monkey Trouble (1994)
- Amici ahrarara (2001)

=== Television ===
- Il mio amico Babbo Natale (2005)
- Due imbroglioni e... mezzo! (2007)
- Due imbroglioni e... mezzo! – (miniseries) (2010)
- Love, Lights, Hanukkah! (2020) played the part of Giorgio
