= Bujar Lako =

Albanian actor (1946–2016)

- Born: 23 May 1946; Korçë, PR Albania
- Died: 26 December 2016 (aged 70); Tirana, Albania
- Occupation: Actor
- Years active: 1973–2016

Bujar Lako (23 May 1946 – 26 December 2016) was an Albanian actor who appeared in numerous films and theaters, playing the lead roles of hundreds characters. He died on 26 December 2016, at the age of 70.

== Filmography ==
Film
Year	Title	Role	Notes
1975	Në fillim te verës	Misto	
1976	Përballimi	Martin Kreka	
1978	Udha e shkronjave	Tunxhi	TV movie
1978	Gjeneral gramafoni	Halit Berati	
1979	Ballë për ballë	Mujo Bermema	
1982	Nëntori i dytë	Luigj Gurakuqi	
1983	Dora e ngrohtë	Spahiu	
1984	Vendimi	Këshilltari	
1984	I paharruari	Besim Peja	
1985	Gurët e shtëpisë sime	Tenente Moruçi	
1986	Gabimi	Arjani	
1987	Vrasje ne gjueti	Ferdinand	
1987	Telefoni i një mëngjesi	Nestor	
1987	Binarët	Kujtimi	
1989	Kthimi i ushtrisë së vdekur	Italian general	
2001	Amigo	Teacher	
2003	Lule të kuqe, lule të zeza	Taxi driver	
2005	Syri magjik	Petro	
2009	Honeymoons	Nikov's father	
2014	Amsterdam Express	Selim	
