= When the Night Falls =

2026 film by Daniel Auteuil

- French: La Troisième Nuit
- Literally: The Third Night
- Directed by: Daniel Auteuil
- Written by: Daniel Auteuil; Camille Lugan
- Produced by: Frédéric Jouve
- Starring: Daniel Auteuil; Antoine Reinartz; Grégory Gadebois
- Cinematography: Jean-François Hensgens
- Edited by: Valérie Deseine
- Music by: Olivier Goinard
- Production companies: Les Films Velvet; Zack Films
- Distributed by: SND (France)
- Release date: 17 May 2026 (Cannes)
- Running time: 100 minutes
- Country: France
- Language: French

When the Night Falls (French: La Troisième Nuit, lit. 'The Third Night') is a 2026 French historical drama film co-written, directed and starring Daniel Auteuil. It follows the true story of a mission to rescue of more than one hundred Jewish children from an internment camp near Lyon in August 1942, during the Holocaust.

The film had its world premiere at the Cannes Premiere section at the 79th Cannes Film Festival on 17 May 2026.

== Synopsis ==
In August 1942, the Vichy government organizes a large-scale roundup of foreign Jews. Gilbert Lesage, a young civil servant who leads the regime's Service social des étrangers (SSE), is tasked with determining the fate of the arrested Jews, and attempts to save the Jewish children at the internment camp in Vénissieux from deportation with the aid of Catholic priest Alexandre Glasberg

== Cast ==
- Antoine Reinartz as Gilbert Lesage
- Daniel Auteuil as Alexandre Glasberg
- Luàna Bajrami as Lili Tager
- Grégory Gadebois as Lucien Marchais

== Production ==
=== Development ===
In April 2025, on the occasion of his film An Ordinary Case winning the Jacques Deray Prize at the Institut Lumière in Lyon, Daniel Auteuil revaled his next film project would be about Lyon and Vénissieux. Auteuil co-wrote the screenplay with filmmaker Camille Lugan. In June 2025, it was announced that the film would be titled La Nuit and would begin filming in October 2025, with Antoine Reinartz and Grégory Gadebois starring. In a December 2025 interview, Auteuil commented: "It's a story that deeply moved me. When it was proposed to me, I felt the urge to immerse myself in it and tell it. Human suffering is still, unfortunately, relevant."

In September 2025, a casting call was held in Le Mans for children to portray Jewish children held prisoner in a camp. In October 2025, a second casting call was held in Le Mans seeking one hundred extras aged 18 to 65 to portray police officers, gendarmes, doctors, nurses, nuns, prisoners, patients, bus drivers and more.

=== Filming ===
Principal photography, under the new working title Une Nuit, began on 27 October 2025 in Lyon, continuing there for fifteen days. Filming locations in Lyon included the Palais de la Bourse, the Musée des Tissus, the Basilica of Notre-Dame de Fourvière and the streets of Vieux Lyon. On 10 November 2025, shooting began in the south of the Sarthe department, around La Flèche at the Église Sainte-Colombe, among other sites, as well as at the Thorée-les-Pins military camp. Filming wrapped in Sarthe on 6 December 2025. Jean-François Hensgens served as the director of photography.

The film was produced by Frédéric Jouve for Les Films Velvet and by Auteuil's Zack Films, in co-production with Auvergne-Rhône-Alpes Cinéma.

== Release ==
When the Night Falls was selected to be screened in the Cannes Premiere section of the 79th Cannes Film Festival, where it had its world premiere on 17 May 2026.

International sales are handled by SND, which is also scheduled to theatrically release the film in France in 2026.
