= Élisa Servier =

French actress

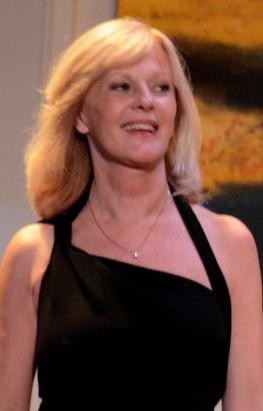
- Website: http://www.elisa-servier.fr

Élisa Servier (born 5 May 1955 in Villepinte, Seine-Saint-Denis, France) is a French actress.

== Life ==
After a childhood spent in the countryside, near Paris, Elisa Servier debuted at the cinema in 1973, at the age of 18, in a comedy, Le Chaud Lapin, by Pascal Thomas. She reports being raped during that film.

She appeared in the feature film with Bernard Ménez and Daniel Ceccaldi. In 1978, she met Daniel Ceccaldi, as well as Pascal Thomas, who directed Confidences for Confidences, the story of a generation of women throughout the history of the three young sisters, suburbanites who became Parisian in the 1960s. She worked for seven years as a model, in Paris, Milan, Hamburg and New York.

She spent three years in comedy classes at Florent with Francis Huster, and in 1980, toured with David Hamilton in Tendres Cousines. She followed the same year with her first play, Le Garçon d'appartement, by Gérard Lauzier, directed by Daniel Auteuil at Petit-Marigny. In 1981, she played in Le Divan, by Remo Forlani, at the La Bruyère theater, alongside Roger Pierre and Isabelle Mergault, and under the direction of Pierre Mondy. Subsequently, she appeared in a hundred films and TV movies, including the great summer sagas of TF1 Wind of the harvest and Summer storms, by Jean Sagols, with Annie Girardot and Gerard Klein. She thus marks her presence at Central Nuit, alongside Michel Creton and Nestor Burma, Léo Mallet, where she played the role of Commissioner Niel against Guy Marchand.

Elisa Servier is also the mother of two children: a first boy, Julien, and a daughter, Manon de Toledo.

On the big screen, she appeared in We are not angels ... them either, by Michel Lang, where she plays the little sister of Sabine Azema, and in Pour bricks, you have nothing more .. ., of Édouard Molinaro, with Gérard Jugnot and Daniel Auteuil, with whom she appears again in A few days with me of Claude Sautet, in 1988. In 2010, she played in the comedy with Bienvenue aboard, by Eric Lavaine, alongside Valérie Lemercier, Franck Dubosc and Gérard Darmon. In 2013, along with Jean-Pierre Darroussin, Marc Lavoine, Bernard Campan and Eric Elmosnino, she played Sophie, in The Heart of Men 3, directed by Marc Esposito.

== Filmography ==
=== Film ===
- 1974 : Le Chaud Lapin, de Pascal Thomas : Nathalie
- 1979 : Confidences pour confidences, de Pascal Thomas : Florence
- 1980 : Tendres Cousines, de David Hamilton : Claire
- 1981 : On n'est pas des anges... elles non plus, de Michel Lang : Alicia
- 1982 : Pour cent briques, t'as plus rien..., d'Édouard Molinaro : Caroline
- 1983 : L'Été de nos quinze ans, de Marcel Jullian : Maud
- 1984 : Le Garde du corps, de François Leterrier : Catherine
- 1984 : Partenaires, de Claude d'Anna : Marie-Lou Pasquier
- 1988 : Quelques jours avec moi de Claude Sautet : Lucie
- 1997 : Bruits d'amour, de Jacques Otmezguine : Caro
- 1998 : Nous sommes tous des gagnants, de Claude Dray (court-métrage)
- 1999 : Peut-être, de Cédric Klapisch : la mère réveillon
- 2011 : Bienvenue à bord d'Éric Lavaine : Caroline Berthelot
- 2013 : Le Cœur des hommes 3 de Marc Esposito : Sophie

=== Television ===
- 1979 : La Fabrique, un conte de Noël, de Pascal Thomas (Téléfilm)
- 1981 : Au théâtre ce soir : Mort ou vif de Max Régnier, mise en scène Christian Duroc, réalisation Pierre Sabbagh, théâtre Marigny : Michèle Martineau
- 1982 : Le Divan (téléfilm) : Dorothée
- 1987 : Chahut-bahut, de Jean Sagols (série télévisée)
- 1988 : Le Vent des moissons, de Jean Sagols (série télévisée) : Sylvie Leclerc
- 1988 : Loft Story, de Stéphane Bertin et Boramy Tioulong (série télévisée)
- 1988 : Anges et loups, de Boramy Tioulong (série télévisée) : Camille
- 1989 : L'Agence, de Jean Sagols (série télévisée)
- 1989 : Orages d'été, de Jean Sagols (série télévisée) : Martine
- 1990 : Orages d'été, avis de tempête, de Jean Sagols (série télévisée) : Martine
- 1991 : Duplex (téléfilm) : Liza
- 1992 : Quand épousez-vous ma femme ?, de Daniel Colas (téléfilm) : Nadette
- 1993 : Martineau... et le portrait de femme, de Daniel Moosmann (téléfilm) : Catherine Trigou
- 1993 : Regarde-moi quand je te quitte, de Philippe de Broca (téléfilm) : Angélique
- 1993 : Pris au piège, de Michel Favart (téléfilm) : Le juge d'instruction
- 1993 : Les Grandes Marées, de Jean Sagols (série télévisée) : Brigitte Maréchal
- 1993 : Les Noces de carton, de Pierre Sisser (téléfilm) : Samantha
- 1995 : La Rose noire, Jean Sagols (téléfilm) : Lily Lagarde
- 1995 : Carreau d'as, de Laurent Carcélès (téléfilm) : Ginny
- 1995 : Des mots qui déchirent, de Marco Pauly (téléfilm) : Martine Lachatre
- 1996 : La Guerre des poux, de Jean-Luc Trotignon (téléfilm) : Martine
- 1997 : Bonjour Antoine, de Radu Mihaileanu (téléfilm) : Mme Lacroix
- 1998 : Mauvaises affaires, de Jean-Louis Bertuccelli (téléfilm) : Hélène
- 1998 : La Dernière des romantiques, de Joyce Buñuel (téléfilm) : Sophie
- 1998 - 2000 : Cap des Pins, d'Emmanuelle Dubergey, Bernard Dumont, Emmanuel Fonlladosa, Pascal Heylbroeck et Dominique Masson (série télévisée) : Isabelle Mori
- 1999 : Madame le Proviseur, de Jean-Marc Seban (série télévisée) : Marianne
- 1999 : Maître Da Costa, de Nicolas Ribowski et Jean-Louis Bertuccelli (série télévisée) : Carine Moulin
- 1999 : Revient le jour, de Jean-Louis Lorenzi (téléfilm) : Rose-Marie Rénal
- 2000 : Affaires familiales (série télévisée) : La présidente Irène Jaffry
- 2000 - 2003 : Nestor Burma, de Jacob Berger (série télévisée) : Commissaire Niel
- 2001 - 2008 : Central nuit, de Pascale Dallet et Franck Vestiel (série télévisée) : Martine Davrat
- 2003 : Impair et Père, de Jean-Luc Moreau (téléfilm) : Sophie Paillard
- 2003 : L'Instit, de Jean Sagols (série télévisée) : Françoise
- 2005 : Faites comme chez vous !, de Pascal Heylbroeck (série télévisée) : Viviane Bernardy
- 2006 : Une juge sous influence, de Jean-Louis Bertuccelli (téléfilm) : Valérie Léoni
- 2006 : Louis Page, d'Antoine Lorenzi (série télévisée) : Sonia
- 2006 : Capitaine Casta : Amélie a disparu, de Joyce Buñuel (téléfilm) : Françoise Casta
- 2007 : Julie Lescaut (série télévisée) : Isabelle Gaudel
- 2008 : Les belles-sœurs (téléfilm) : Christelle
- 2009 : Profilage (série télévisée) : Régine
- 2010 : Camping Paradis (série télévisée - saison 2, épisode 3) : Mme Bellegarde
- 2010 : Joséphine, ange gardien (série télévisée) : Corinne Durieu
- 2011 : Le Grand Restaurant II, de Gérard Pullicino (téléfilm)
- 2013 : Enquêtes réservées (série télévisée)
- 2016 : Camping Paradis (saison 7, épisode 5) : Sylvie
- 2018 : Commissaire Magellan (série) : Crossover Mongeville et Magellan (épisode Un amour de jeunesse) : Delphine

== Theater ==
- 1980 : Le Garçon d'appartement de Gérard Lauzier, mise en scène Daniel Auteuil, Petit Marigny
- 1981 : Le Divan de Remo Forlani, mise en scène Max Douy, théâtre La Bruyère
- 1984 : On m'appelle Émilie de Maria Pacôme, mise en scène Jean-Luc Moreau, théâtre Saint-Georges
- 1991 : Quand épousez-vous ma femme ? de Jean-Bernard Luc et Jean-Pierre Conty, mise en scène Daniel Colas
- 1996 : Panique au Plazza, de Ray Cooney, mise en scène Pierre Mondy, théâtre Marigny
- 2001 : Impair et Père de Ray Cooney, mise en scène Jean-Luc Moreau, théâtre de la Michodière
- 2004 : Lune de miel de Noël Coward, mise en scène Bernard Murat, théâtre Édouard VII
- 2005 : Amitiés sincères de François Prévôt-Leygonie et Stephan Archinard, mise en scène Bernard Murat, théâtre Édouard VII
- 2007 : Les Belles-sœurs d'Éric Assous, mise en scène Jean-Luc Moreau, théâtre Saint-Georges
- 2008-2009 : Secret de famille d'Éric Assous, mise en scène Jean-Luc Moreau, théâtre des Variétés, tournée
- 2010 : Le Technicien d'Éric Assous, mise en scène Jean-Luc Moreau, théâtre du Palais-Royal
- 2011 : Une journée ordinaire d'Éric Assous, mise en scène Jean-Luc Moreau, théâtre des Bouffes-Parisiens
- 2011 : Le Coup de la cigogne de Jean-Claude Isler, mise en scène Jean-Luc Moreau, théâtre Saint-Georges
- 2013 : Une journée ordinaire d'Éric Assous, mise en scène Jean-Luc Moreau, tournée
- 2017 - 2018 : Au revoir... et merci! de Bruno Druart, mise en scène Didier Brengarth, tournée
