= Florida Film Critics Circle Award for Best Foreign Language Film =

Annual US film award

The Florida Film Critics Circle Award for Best Foreign Language Film is an award given by the Florida Film Critics Circle to honor the finest achievements in film-making.

== Winners ==
=== 1990s ===
| Year | Winner | Country | Director(s) |
|---|---|---|---|
| 1996 | Ridicule | France | Patrice Leconte |
| 1997 | Shall We Dance? (Shall we dansu?) | Japan | Masayuki Suo |
| 1998 | Life Is Beautiful (La vita è bella) | Italy | Roberto Benigni |
| 1999 | Run Lola Run (Lola rennt) | Germany | Tom Tykwer |

=== 2000s ===
| Year | Winner | Country | Director(s) |
|---|---|---|---|
| 2000 | Crouching Tiger, Hidden Dragon (Wo hu cang long) | Taiwan | Ang Lee |
| 2001 | Amélie (Le fabuleux destin d'Amélie Poulain) | France | Jean-Pierre Jeunet |
| 2002 | And Your Mother Too (Y tu mamá también) | Mexico | Alfonso Cuarón |
| 2003 | The Man on the Train (L'homme du train) | France | Patrice Leconte |
| 2004 | A Very Long Engagement (Un long dimanche de fiançailles) | France / United States | Jean-Pierre Jeunet |
| 2005 | Kung Fu Hustle (Kung fu) | China / Hong Kong | Stephen Chow |
| 2006 | Pan's Labyrinth (El laberinto del fauno) | Mexico | Guillermo del Toro |
| 2007 | The Diving Bell and the Butterfly (Le scaphandre et le papillon) | France | Julian Schnabel |
| 2008 | Let the Right One In (Låt den rätte komma in) | Sweden | Tomas Alfredson |
| 2009 | Without Name (Sin nombre) | Spain | Cary Joji Fukunaga |

=== 2010s ===
| Year | Winner | Country | Director(s) |
|---|---|---|---|
| 2010 | I Am Love (Io sono l'amore) | Italy | Luca Guadagnino |
| 2011 | The Skin I Live In (La piel que habito) | Spain | Pedro Almodóvar |
| 2012 | The Intouchables | France | Olivier Nakache, Éric Toledano |
| 2013 | Blue Is the Warmest Colour | France | Abdellatif Kechiche |
| 2014 | The Raid 2 | Indonesia | Gareth Evans |
| 2015 | The Assassin | Taiwan | Hou Hsiao-hsien |
| 2016 | Elle | France | Paul Verhoeven |
| 2017 | BPM (Beats per Minute) | France | Robin Campillo |
| 2018 | Shoplifters | Japan | Hirokazu Kore-eda |
| 2019 | Portrait of a Lady on Fire | France | Céline Sciamma |

=== 2020s ===
| Year | Winner | Country | Director(s) |
|---|---|---|---|
| 2020 | The Strong Ones (Los fuertes) | Chile | Omar Zúñiga Hidalgo |
| 2021 | The Hand of God (È stata la mano di Dio) | Italy | Paolo Sorrentino |
| 2022 | Decision to Leave (Heeojil gyeolsim) | South Korea | Park Chan-wook |
| 2023 | Anatomy of a Fall (Anatomie d'une chute) | France | Justine Triet |
| 2024 | All We Imagine as Light (Prabhayaay Ninachathellam) | India | Payal Kapadia |
| 2025 | No Other Choice (Eojjeol suga eopda) (TIE) | South Korea | Park Chan-wook |
| 2025 | Grand Tour (TIE) | Portugal | Miguel Gomes |
