= Le Fil =

Le Fil may refer to:

- Le Fil (album), 2005 album by Camille
- Le Fil (2009 film), directed by Mehdi Ben Attia
- Le Fil (2024 film), directed by Daniel Auteuil
- Le Fil (drag queen), British drag queen
