= Aurore Auteuil =

French actress

- Born: 28 March 1981 (age 45); Neuilly-sur-Seine, France
- Occupation: Actress

Aurore Auteuil (French pronunciation: [ɔʁɔʁ otœj]; born 28 March 1981) is a French actress and the eldest daughter of Anne Jousset and Daniel Auteuil.

== Filmography ==
Year	Title	Role	Notes
2001	The Closet	Girl at restaurant	uncredited
2003	Avocats & associés	Juliette Jeanson	1 episode, Secrets de campagne
2003	Nathalie...	La patiente de Catherine	
2003	Julie Lescaut	Valérie	1 episode, Hors-la-loi
2004	Confidences trop intimes	The Student Nabokov	
2004	36 Quai des Orfèvres	Lola Vrinks (17 ans)	
2004	Les Soeurs fâchées	L'hôtesse accueil éditeur	
2006	Ange de feu	Carine Cabrel	TV
2006	Hey Good Looking !	Carole	
2007	Chat bleu, chat noir	Gina	TV
2007	Je nous aime beaucoup		TV
2008	Nicolas Le Floch	Madame Adélaïde	1 episode, L'homme au ventre de plomb
2008	L'amour dans le sang	Florence	TV

== Bibliography ==
- "Aurore Auteuil". Evene. 1981.
