= Paramount Vantage =

Specialty film division of Paramount Pictures

- Formerly: Paramount Classics (1998–2006)
- Type: Label
- Industry: Film
- Founded: May 15, 1998; 28 years ago
- Founders: David Dinerstein; Ruth Vitale
- Defunct: November 15, 2014; 12 years ago
- Fate: Dormant
- Successor: Studio: Miramax; Library: Paramount Pictures
- Headquarters: 5555 Melrose Avenue, Hollywood, Los Angeles California, U.S
- Key people: John Lesher (president); Nick Meyer (co-president)
- Products: Motion pictures
- Parent: Paramount Pictures

Paramount Vantage, Inc. (formerly known as Paramount Classics, Inc.) was a film production label of Paramount Pictures, charged with producing, purchasing, distributing and marketing films, generally those with a more "art house" feel than films made and distributed by its parent company. Previously, Paramount Vantage operated as the specialty film division of Paramount Pictures, owned by Viacom (now Paramount Skydance). It was active from May 15, 1998 to November 15, 2014.

== History ==
Paramount Classics was launched on May 15, 1998 and released such art house fare as The Virgin Suicides, You Can Count on Me, Sunshine, Mostly Martha, Winter Solstice, and three Patrice Leconte films (Girl on the Bridge, The Man on the Train, Intimate Strangers). Although film journalist David Poland felt "Ruth Vitale and David Dinerstein have proven to have wonderful taste heading up Paramount Classics", the duo was fired in October 2005.

In 2006, the Paramount Vantage brand branched off from Paramount Classics, which was relaunched in 2007 as a distributor of "smaller, review-driven films including foreign-language acquisitions and documentaries."

In 2007, Paramount Vantage partnered with then-Disney subsidiary Miramax Films on two of the year's most highly regarded movies, No Country for Old Men and There Will Be Blood. Both films garnered eight nominations at the 80th Academy Awards, with There Will Be Blood winning the awards for Best Cinematography and Best Actor for Daniel Day-Lewis, while No Country for Old Men won for Best Adapted Screenplay, Best Director, Best Supporting Actor for Javier Bardem, and Best Picture.

Despite its critical success, Paramount Vantage continually failed to deliver the financial returns Paramount Pictures expected. Only No Country for Old Men made a profit, while films that many believe should have generated significant returns failed to deliver through either poor or excessive marketing.

In June 2008, Paramount Pictures consolidated Paramount Vantage's marketing, distribution, and physical production departments into the parent studio, while retaining the Paramount Vantage brand to develop and acquire specialty product with dedicated creative staff.

Paramount Vantage closed down on November 15, 2014 after the release of Nebraska in 2013.

On December 20, 2019, ViacomCBS (later named Paramount Global) announced it would acquire a 49% stake in Miramax for at least $375 million, with Paramount Pictures gaining exclusive worldwide distribution rights to its film and television library. Paramount Pictures and Miramax will also co-produce new content based on titles from the library. The deal officially closed on April 3, 2020.

== Releases ==
=== Paramount Classics ===
Name	Release date	Market(s)	Notes/Production company(s)
Trekkies (Note: Owned by Shout! Studios)	March 12, 1999	Worldwide	Neo Art & Logic
Get Real	April 30, 1999	U.S., Canada, the U.K. and Ireland	Distant Horizon
Cabaret Balkan	July 23, 1999	U.S., the U.K., Ireland, Australia and New Zealand	
The Adventures of Sebastian Cole	August 6, 1999	U.S., South America, the U.K., Ireland, Australia, New Zealand and South Africa	Cuplan Productions LLC
Train of Life	November 12, 1999	U.S. and Canada	
Where's Marlowe?	November 12, 1999	Worldwide	
Deterrence	March 10, 2000	U.S., Canada, the U.K. and Ireland	
The Virgin Suicides	May 12, 2000	North and Latin America, Australia, New Zealand and South Africa	American Zoetrope
Passion of Mind	May 26, 2000	U.S. and Canada	Lakeshore Entertainment
Sunshine	June 9, 2000	U.S., Australia and New Zealand	Alliance Atlantis, Serendipity Point Films, Bavaria Film, Kinowelt Filmproduktion and Channel Four Films
Girl on the Bridge	July 28, 2000	North and Latin America	
You Can Count on Me	November 17, 2000	U.S., Latin America, the U.K., Ireland, France, the Benelux, Australia, New Zealand, South Africa and Japan	Shooting Gallery and Hart-Sharp Entertainment; rights licensed to Momentum Pictures for the U.K. and Ireland
The Gift	December 22, 2000	U.S. and Canada	Lakeshore Entertainment
Company Man	March 9, 2001	North and Latin America and Japan	Intermedia
Savage Souls	May 20, 2001	North and Latin America, the U.K., Ireland, Australia and New Zealand	
Bride of the Wind	June 8, 2001	U.S. and Canada	
An American Rhapsody	August 24, 2001	North and Latin America, the U.K., Ireland, France, Australia and New Zealand	Fireworks Pictures and Seven Arts Pictures
Our Lady of the Assassins	September 7, 2001	U.S., Australia, New Zealand, South Africa and select Central and Latin American territories including Colombia	
My First Mister	October 12, 2001	North and Latin America, the U.K., Ireland, Australia, New Zealand, South Africa and Japan	
Focus	November 2, 2001	North and Latin America, the U.K., Ireland, Australia, New Zealand, South Africa and Japan	
Sidewalks of New York	November 21, 2001	U.S., Canada, Australia, New Zealand and Japan	
Mean Machine	February 22, 2002	U.S., Canada and worldwide home media	SKA Films and Brad Grey Productions
Festival in Cannes	March 3, 2002	North and Latin America, Australia, New Zealand and Japan	Rainbow Pictures
Triumph of Love	May 10, 2002	North and Latin America, the U.K., Ireland, Australia, New Zealand, South Africa and Japan	
The Emperor's New Clothes	June 14, 2002	North and Latin America, Australia, New Zealand, South Africa and Japan	FilmFour
Who Is Cletis Tout? (Note: Currently owned by Westside Pictures, with Magnolia Pictures handling US distribution)	July 26, 2002	U.S., Canada, Australia and New Zealand	Fireworks Entertainment
Mostly Martha	August 16, 2002	North and Latin America, the U.K., Ireland, Australia, New Zealand and South Africa	rights licensed to Optimum Releasing for the U.K. and Ireland; Bavaria Film
Just a Kiss	September 27, 2002	North and Latin America, the U.K., Ireland, Australia, New Zealand, South Africa and Japan	Greenestreet Films
Bloody Sunday	October 4, 2002	North and Latin America, Australia, New Zealand and Japan	
The Way Home	November 15, 2002	U.S., Canada, the U.K., Ireland, Australia, New Zealand and South Africa	CJ Entertainment and Tube Entertainment
Till Human Voices Wake Us	February 21, 2003	North and Latin America, the U.K., Ireland, South Africa and the Middle East	
House of Fools	April 25, 2003	North and Latin America, the U.K., Ireland, Australia and New Zealand	
The Man on the Train	May 9, 2003	U.S., English-speaking Canada, Latin America, Australia, New Zealand and South Africa	Pathé
Northfork	July 11, 2003	North and Latin America, the U.K., Ireland, Australia, New Zealand and South Africa	theatrical and home video rights licensed to Metrodome Distribution for the U.K. and Ireland
And Now... Ladies and Gentlemen	August 8, 2003	North and Latin America, the U.K., Ireland, Australia, New Zealand, South Africa and Japan	
The Singing Detective	October 24, 2003	North and Latin America and Japan	Icon Productions
The Machinist	January 18, 2004	North and Latin America, the U.K., Ireland, Australia, New Zealand and South Africa	rights licensed to Tartan Films for the U.K. and Ireland and Rialto Distribution for Australia and New Zealand; Filmax and Castelao Productions
The Reckoning	March 5, 2004	North and Latin America, South Africa, Australasia and Japan	Renaissance Films
The United States of Leland	April 2, 2004	North and Latin America, Australia and New Zealand	Media 8 Entertainment and Trigger Street Productions
Love Me If You Dare	May 11, 2004	U.S., Canada, Australia, New Zealand and Scandinavia	StudioCanal
I'll Sleep When I'm Dead	June 16, 2004	U.S., Latin America, Australia, New Zealand, the Middle East and Japan	Revere Pictures and Seven Arts
Intimate Strangers	July 30, 2004	U.S., Latin America, Australia, New Zealand and Japan	rights licensed to Wise Policy and Happinet Pictures for Japan
Mean Creek	August 20, 2004	North and Latin America, the U.K., Ireland, Australia and New Zealand	rights licensed to Tartan Films for the U.K. and Ireland and Rialto Distribution for Australia and New Zealand; Whitewater Films
Enduring Love	October 29, 2004	North and Latin America	Pathé and FilmFour
Fade to Black	November 5, 2004	Worldwide	@radical.media, Marcy Projects, and Roc-A-Fella Records
Schultze Gets the Blues	February 18, 2005	North and Latin America, the U.K., Ireland, Australia, New Zealand, Germany and Austria	
Winter Solstice	April 8, 2005	North and Latin America, the U.K., Ireland, Australia, New Zealand and South Africa	
Mad Hot Ballroom	May 13, 2005	Worldwide excluding Australia and New Zealand	co-distribution with Nickelodeon Movies only; Just One Productions; international theatrical rights licensed to Fortissimo Films
After You...	June 3, 2005	U.S., Canada, the U.K. and Ireland	
Hustle & Flow	July 22, 2005	Worldwide	co-distribution with MTV Films only; New Deal Entertainment
Asylum	August 12, 2005	North and Latin America, the U.K., Ireland, Australia, New Zealand and South Africa	rights licensed to Momentum Pictures for the U.K. and Ireland; Seven Arts
Neil Young: Heart of Gold	February 10, 2006	Worldwide	Shangri-La Entertainment, Reprise Records, Playtone, Clinica Estetico, and Shakey Pictures
Ask the Dust	March 17, 2006	U.S. and Canada	Capitol Films, Ascendant Pictures and Cruise/Wagner Productions
An Inconvenient Truth	May 24, 2006	Worldwide	Participant Productions
Typhoon	June 2, 2006	U.S. and Canada	CJ Entertainment
Broken Bridges	September 8, 2006	Worldwide	CMT Films
Arctic Tale	July 25, 2007	North and Latin America, the U.K., Ireland, France, Australia, New Zealand and South Africa	National Geographic Films
Beneath	August 7, 2007	Worldwide	MTV Films
The Kite Runner	December 14, 2007	Worldwide	rights licensed to Filmauro for Italy, Sandrew Metronome for Scandinavia and Kadokawa Herald Pictures for Japan; DreamWorks Pictures, Sidney Kimmel Entertainment and Participant Productions
Shine a Light	April 4, 2008	U.S. and Canada	Shangri-La Entertainment and Concert Productions International
Padmaavat	January 25, 2018	U.K., Ireland, Australia, New Zealand and the Middle East	theatrical distribution only; Viacom18 Motion Pictures and Bhansali Productions

=== Paramount Vantage ===
Release date	Film title	Academy Awards and notes
October 27, 2006	Babel	distribution in North and Latin America, the U.K., Ireland, Australia, New Zealand, South Africa and Spain only; produced by Anonymous Content, Zeta Film and Central Films: Won; Best Original Score; Additional nominations; Best Director: Alejandro González Iñárritu; Best Editing; Best Picture; Best Original Screenplay; Best Supporting Actress: Adriana Barraza; Best Supporting Actress: Rinko Kikuchi
January 20, 2007	Year of the Dog	co-production with Rip Cord Productions and Plan B Entertainment
March 2, 2007	Black Snake Moan	co-production with New Deal Productions and Southern Cross the Dog Productions
June 22, 2007	A Mighty Heart	co-production with Plan B Entertainment and Revolution Films
September 21, 2007	Into the Wild	distribution outside France, Germany, Austria, Switzerland, the Benelux, Japan, Spain, Andorra and Italy only; co-production with River Road Entertainment, Square One C.I.H. and Linson Film: 2 Nominations; Best Editing; Best Supporting Actor: Hal Holbrook
November 9, 2007	No Country for Old Men (Note: Paramount now owns worldwide rights to this film, having acquired a 49% stake in Miramax in 2020)	international distribution only; co-production with Miramax Films, Scott Rudin Productions and Mike Zoss Productions: Won; Best Director: Ethan and Joel Coen; Best Picture; Best Adapted Screenplay; Best Supporting Actor: Javier Bardem; Additional nominations; Best Cinematography; Best Editing; Best Sound Mixing; Best Sound Editing
November 16, 2007	Margot at the Wedding	co-production with Scott Rudin Productions
December 26, 2007	There Will Be Blood	North American distribution only; co-production with Miramax Films, Scott Rudin Productions and Ghoulardi Film Company: Won; Best Actor: Daniel Day-Lewis; Best Cinematography; Additional nominations; Best Art Direction; Best Director: Paul Thomas Anderson; Best Editing; Best Picture; Best Adapted Screenplay; Best Sound Editing
January 25, 2008	How She Move	co-distribution outside Canada with MTV Films only; produced by Celluloid Dreams and Sienna Films
February 1, 2008	The Eye	co-distribution with Lionsgate only; co-production with Cruise/Wagner Productions and Vertigo Entertainment
May 2, 2008	Son of Rambow	distribution outside Japan, Germany, Austria and French free television only; produced by Celluloid Dreams
May 30, 2008	The Foot Fist Way	co-distribution with MTV Films and Gary Sanchez Productions
July 25, 2008	American Teen	distribution outside the U.K. and Ireland only; produced by A&E IndieFilms, Firehouse Films, Quasiworld Entertainment and 57th & Irving
August 27, 2008	Traitor (Note: Owned by Lionsgate)	international distribution only; produced by Overture Films, Mandeville Films, Hyde Park Entertainment and Crescendo Productions
September 19, 2008	The Duchess	distribution in North and Latin America, Australia, New Zealand and Japan only; produced by Pathe, BBC Films, Qwerty Films and Magnolia Mae Films: Won; Best Costume Design; Additional nomination; Best Art Direction
December 25, 2008	Last Chance Harvey	international distribution only; produced by Overture Films
December 26, 2008	Revolutionary Road	distribution only; produced by DreamWorks Pictures, BBC Films, Evamere Entertainment and Neal Street Productions: 3 Nominations; Best Art Direction; Best Costume Design; Best Supporting Actor: Michael Shannon
December 31, 2008	Defiance	North American and South African distribution only; produced by Grosvenor Park Productions and Bedford Falls Productions: 1 Nomination; Best Original Score
August 14, 2009	The Goods: Live Hard, Sell Hard	co-production with Gary Sanchez Productions
August 21, 2009	The Marc Pease Experience	co-production with Groundswell Productions and Firefly Pictures
September 4, 2009	Carriers	co-production with Likely Story and This Is That Productions
October 2, 2009	Capitalism: A Love Story	international distribution only; co-production with Overture Films, The Weinstein Company and Dog Eat Dog Films
February 19, 2010	Shutter Island	distribution in Germany, Austria, Italy, Spain, Andorra, the CIS and the Baltics only; produced by Paramount Pictures, Phoenix Pictures, Sikelia Productions and Appian Way Productions
February 26, 2010	The Crazies	international distribution only; produced by Overture Films, Participant Media and Imagenation Abu Dhabi
March 5, 2010	Ondine	international distribution outside the U.K. and Ireland only; produced by Wayfare Entertainment, Octagon Films and Little Wave Productions; distributed in the U.S. by Magnolia Pictures
March 12, 2010	13	international distribution outside the U.K. and Ireland only; produced by Magnet Media Group, Overnight Films, Barbarian Films and the Morabito Picture Company
August 8, 2010	Middle Men (Note: Owned by Gravitas Ventures)	distribution only; produced by Mallick Media, Oxymoron Entertainment and Blue Star Entertainment
September 24, 2010	Waiting for "Superman"	distribution only; produced by Participant Media, Walden Media and Electric Kinney Films
October 1, 2010	Case 39	co-production with Misher Films and Anonymous Content
October 28, 2011	Like Crazy	co-distribution with Indian Paintbrush only; produced by Super Crispy Entertainment
March 16, 2012	Jeff, Who Lives at Home	co-production with Indian Paintbrush, Right of Way Films and Mr. Mudd
December 21, 2012	Not Fade Away	co-production with Indian Paintbrush, The Weinstein Company, Gran Via Productions and Chase Films
November 15, 2013	Nebraska	distribution in North America, the U.K., Ireland and Germany only; co-production with FilmNation Entertainment, Blue Lake Media Fund, Echo Lake Entertainment and Bona Fide Productions: 6 Nominations; Best Actor: Bruce Dern; Best Cinematography: Phedon Papamichael; Best Director: Alexander Payne; Best Original Screenplay: Bob Nelson; Best Picture; Best Supporting Actress: June Squibb

== See also ==
- Paramount Pictures
- Go Fish Pictures
- Miramax Films
