= Charlie Nelson (actor) =

French actor (1954–2026)

- Born: 18 April 1954; Vincennes, France
- Died: 23 June 2026 (aged 72); Paris, France
- Education: Conservatoire national supérieur d'art dramatique
- Occupation: Actor
- Years active: 1978–2025

Charlie Nelson Euwer (French: [ʃaʁlˈi nˈɛlsən]; 18 April 1954 – 23 June 2026) was a French actor. A graduate of the Conservatoire national supérieur d'art dramatique, he spent his career both on the stage and in film from 1978 to 2025. Nelson died on 23 June 2026.

== Filmography ==
=== Film ===
- Rive droite, rive gauche (1984)
- Wild Target (1993)
- La Reine Margot (1994)
- On Guard (1997)
- The Man on the Train (2002)
- Locked Out (2006)
- Marius (2013)
- Diplomacy (2014)
- Masquerade (2022)
- A Difficult Year (2023)
- An Ordinary Case (2024)
- The Marching Band (2024)

=== Television ===
- Médecins de nuit (1978)
- Navarro (1992)
- Commissaire Moulin (2002)
- Ainsi soient-ils (2003)
- Calm at Sea (2011)
- Balthazar (2020)
- La rebelle: Les aventures de la jeune George Sand (2025)
