= Jean-Yves Moyart =

French criminal lawyer (1967–2021)

- Born: 21 October 1967; Lille, France
- Died: 20 February 2021 (aged 53)
- Other names: Maître Mô
- Occupations: Lawyer; Blogger

Jean-Yves Moyart, sometimes known as Maître Mô (21 October 1967 – 20 February 2021) was a French criminal lawyer and blogger.

== Biography ==
Moyart's parents were literature teachers in Lille, where he was born on 21 October 1967. In 1992, he earned a master's degree in law theory and judicial science from Lille 2 University of Health and Law. That same year, he became a member of the Lille Bar. He worked as a criminal defense lawyer in the office of Philippe Simoneau and Christian Delbé before opening his own practice in 1994 alongside Jérôme Pianezza. According to La Voix du Nord, he was "responsible for the criminal law training module within the Convention Nationale des Avocats de Lille".

In spring 2008, Moyart opened a blog in which he went under the pseudonym "Maître Mô", which had over 100,000 viewers by 2011, thanks in part to notability given by Maître Eolas. That same year, many of his texts were published by Éditions de la Table ronde under the title Au guet-apens : chroniques de la justice pénale ordinaire. Another edition was published in 2013. In 2015, he announced that half his activities concerned cases of people benefiting from legal aid. He defended Maître Eolas in criminal proceedings brought against him by the Institut pour la justice. He also defended Denis Waxin.

Jean-Yves Moyart died on 20 February 2021 at the age of 53.

== Works ==
- Au guet-apens : chroniques de la justice pénale ordinaire (2011)
