= Hubert Deschamps =

French actor (1923–1998)

Hubert Deschamps (13 September 1923 – 29 December 1998) was a French actor.

Deschamps was born in Paris, the son of the museum curator Paul Deschamps (1888–1974) and uncle of the French stage director Jérôme Deschamps. He died in 1998, in Paris, at age 75.

== Selected filmography ==
- The Strollers (1950)
- Street Without a King (1950) - Le monsieur qui vend son assiette (uncredited)
- Bernard and the Lion (1951) - François, le domestique du baron
- Atoll K (1951) - Le fonctionnaire (uncredited)
- Les amours finissent à l'aube (1953)
- Les hommes ne pensent qu'à ça (1954) - L'homme fortuné / Un marcheur
- Les Impures (1954) - Le gendarme à l'hôtel Stella (uncredited)
- Papa, Mama, the Maid and I (1954) - Le spectateur qui n'a pas dîné (uncredited)
- Stopover in Orly (1955) - Un douanier
- French Cancan (1955) - Isidore, le garçon de café (uncredited)
- Fernand cow-boy (1956) - Le maire
- Short Head (1956) - Le serveur 'Gay Paris'
- A Friend of the Family (1957)
- Nous autres à Champignol (1957)
- Comme un cheveu sur la soupe (1957) - Le banquier
- On Foot, on Horse, and on Wheels (1957) - Robichet
- Les Espions (1957) - Un espion dans l'auberge (uncredited)
- Amour de poche (1957) - L'inspecteur
- Mam'zelle Souris (1957)
- Elevator to the Gallows (1958) - Le substitut du procureur
- En bordée (1958)
- Le Sicilien (1958) - Le voyageur Allemand
- Les motards (1959) - Le brigadier Plochut
- Bobosse (1959) - Le souffleur
- The Bureaucrats (1959) - Le curé dans le train
- Les affreux (1959) - Pomaret
- La marraine de Charley (1959) - Le vendeur de voitures
- Le travail c'est la liberté (1959) - Le brigadier
- Pantalaskas (1960) - Rabiniot
- Lovers on a Tightrope (1960) - Carconi
- Murder at 45 R.P.M. (1960) - Le vendeur d'autos
- La 1000eme fenêtre (1960) - Dumas
- Zazie dans le Métro (1960) - Turandot
- The Fenouillard Family (1961) - Le maître d'école
- La peau et les os (1961)
- The Nina B. Affair (1961) - Romberg
- Les livreurs (1961) - L'inspecteur
- Auguste (1961) - Le récitant (uncredited)
- Arsène Lupin Versus Arsène Lupin (1962) - Le ministre
- Tartarin of Tarascon (1962) - Ladévèze
- Three Fables of Love (1962) - L'avocat (segment "Le corbeau et le renard")
- Une blonde comme ça (1963)
- Don't Tempt the Devil (1963) - Dr. Mermet
- The Fire Within (1963) - D'Averseau
- Your Turn, Darling (1963) - Henri Grant
- Le cheval de bataille (1963)
- La Bonne Soupe (1964) - Un client de Marie-Paule (uncredited)
- Dandelions by the Roots (1964) - Général Fréderic Cédille
- Les durs à cuire ou Comment supprimer son prochain sans perdre l'appétit (1964) - Robert Darsac
- Patate (1964) - Adrien
- La chance et l'amour (1964) - Deschamps (segment "Chance du guerrier, La")
- Male Companion (1964) - Le curé (uncredited)
- The Great Spy Chase (1964) - Le douanier (uncredited)
- Les copains (1965) - Le député-maire Cramouillat
- Me and the Forty Year Old Man (1965) - Le directeur du journal (uncredited)
- La corde au cou (1965) - Le patron
- How to Keep the Red Lamp Burning (1965) - Le juge Hardouin (segment "Bons vivants, Les")
- Le Dimanche de la vie (1967) - Bourrelier
- Bang Bang (1967) - Le client mécontent (uncredited)
- Demeure chaste et pure (1967)
- Le tatoué (1968) - Le professeur Mortemont
- Un merveilleux parfum d'oseille (1969) - Le patron d'Yves
- Macédoine (1971)
- Comptes à rebours (1971) - Le concierge / Janitor
- L'ingénu (1972) - Le bailly
- Trop jolies pour être honnêtes (1972) - Le droguiste
- Na! (1973) - L'évêque
- Le Magnifique (1973) - Le vendeur
- The Holes (1974) - L'abbé Lestinguois
- Gross Paris (1974) - Le généralissime
- The Mouth Agape (1974) - Roger le père, 'Le Garçu'
- Le Trio infernal (1974) - Detreuil
- Zig Zag (1975) - Jean Mortagne
- Serious as Pleasure (1975) - L'homme au restaurant
- La Soupe froide (1975) - Delaville
- Le mâle du siècle (1975) - Hubert
- Soldat Duroc, ça va être ta fête! (1975) - Le père de Nicole
- C'est dur pour tout le monde (1975) - Martin
- Chobizenesse (1975) - Taffarel
- The Seventh Company Has Been Found (1975) - Le pharmacien
- Bartleby (1976) - Le gérant
- Tendre Poulet (1977) - Charmille
- Solveig et le violon turc (1977)
- La Zizanie (1978) - Le concierge de l'hôtel
- Coup de tête (1979) - Le directeur de la prison
- Rue du Pied de Grue (1979) - Rachafort
- Démons de midi (1979) - Le réceptionniste à Lyon
- Le Roi et l'oiseau (1980) - Le sentencieux (voice)
- Les sous-doués (1980) - Léon Jumaucourt
- The Lady Banker (1980) - Le commissaire à Meudon
- T'inquiète pas, ça se soigne (1980) - Siméon
- Inspector Blunder (1980) - Inspecteur Marcel Watrin
- Les surdoués de la première compagnie (1981) - Médecin-major
- L'amour trop fort (1981) - Jean Dumaine
- San-Antonio ne pense qu'à ça (1981) - Pinuche
- Pourquoi pas nous? (1981) - L'ophtalmo
- Prends 10000 balles et casse-toi (1981)
- Les Sous-doués en vacances (1982) - Surgeon
- Salut... j'arrive! (1982) - Le directeur de la banque
- Ça va faire mal (1982) - Henri Marcel / Dieu
- Prends ton passe-montagne, on va à la plage (1983) - Pépé
- Ça va pas être triste (1983) - Le médecin / The doctor
- Waiter! (1983) - Armand
- Un bon petit diable (1983) - Boxear
- Next Summer (1985) - Le voisin de Paul
- Tranches de vie (1985) - Le prisonnier
- Adieu Blaireau (1985) - L'ivrogne bar Colette
- Y'a pas le feu... (1985) - Le curé
- Vive le fric (1985) - Gaston Leblanc
- Association de malfaiteurs (1987) - Uncle Gadin
- À notre regrettable époux (1988) - L'imprimeur
- La septième dimension (1988)
- Corps z'a corps (1988) - Le commissaire de police
- Bonjour l'angoisse (1989) - M. Robert
- À deux minutes près (1989) - Chotard
- Mona et moi (1989)
- Un jeu d'enfants (1990) - Pujol
- Stranger in the House (1992) - Beaupoil
- Le Voyage à Paris (1999) - Le vendeur de chaussures
