= A Few Days with Me =

- Theatrical release poster
- Directed by: Claude Sautet
- Produced by: Sara Films
- Starring: Daniel Auteuil; Sandrine Bonnaire; Jean-Pierre Marielle; Danielle Darrieux; Thérèse Liotard
- Cinematography: Jean-François Robin
- Edited by: Jacqueline Thiédot
- Music by: Philippe Sarde
- Distributed by: UGC Distribution
- Release date: 24 August 1988
- Running time: 131 minutes
- Country: France
- Language: French

A Few Days with Me (original title: Quelques jours avec moi) is a 1988 French film directed by Claude Sautet. It received three César Award nominations at the 1989 César Awards.

== Plot ==
Martial (Daniel Auteuil) is discharged from a mental institution where he spent a few years due to a serious nervous breakdown. During his hospitalization, he ceases to speak with everyone, including his wife Régine (Thérèse Liotard), whom he had encouraged to find a new partner soon after entering the clinic. Upon his return, he finds his mother (Danielle Darrieux), a busy business woman who owns a supermarket chain. She is convinced that her son, who by now hardly talks to anyone after his experience, will be able to find himself again if tasked with some responsibilities.

Soon enough, Martial is sent to Limoges on a business trip to check on one of their stores in the hope of reinvigorating its failing business. Once he arrives, Martial is faced with responsibilities he had never imagined, including dealing with the store's personnel. Due to his lack of people skills, this job is a difficult task. Meantime, as instructed by his mother, he checks on the accounting handled by the manager, Mr. Fonfrin (Jean-Pierre Marielle), and he soon realizes that the reason for the branch's close-to-failure status is that Fonfrin is padding the books. Due to his inability to take charge for anything in life, Martial fails to perform his duties and instead befriends the crooked manager, who invites the naive heir to join him and his wife (Dominique Lavanant) for dinner one night. He immediately falls in love with Francine (Sandrine Bonnaire), the maid, an eccentric young woman with whom he has a brief relationship.

Martial unconditionally showers Francine with many gifts, as this is the first time in several years that he feels close to someone; it is a short episode that makes his dejected life momentarily look brighter. He lets his work fall behind for her but, unfortunately, the romance does not last long and, upon his return to Paris, he is deemed incompetent and re-admitted to the hospital.

== Cast ==
- Daniel Auteuil as Martial Pasquier
- Sandrine Bonnaire as Francine
- Danielle Darrieux as Madame Pasquier — Martial's mother
- Jean-Pierre Marielle as Mr. Fonfier
- Dominique Lavanant as Mrs. Fonfier
- Thérèse Liotard as Régine — Martial's wife
- Vincent Lindon as Fernand
- Jean-Pierre Castaldi as Max
- Gérard Ismaël as Rocky
- Tanya Lopert as Madame Maillotte
- Philippe Laudenbach as Monsieur Maillotte
- Dominique Blanc as Georgette
- Élisa Servier

== Reception ==
New York Times' Vincent Canby described Claude Sautet as an artist who often uses his films to lambast bourgeoisie's hypocrisy, a trait that is seen in this and other movies he directed. In Quelques jours avec moi, he uses Martial's character to counter the above, as he represents its antithesis. In Le Figaro, Nicolas Jouenne notes his perception of the film as a comedy at first, rather hilarious, that swerves onto a tragedy toward the end.

== Accolades ==
Organization	Category	Recipients and nominees	Result
César Awards	Best Actor	Daniel Auteuil	Nominated
César Awards	Best Supporting Actor	Jean-Pierre Marielle	Nominated
César Awards	Best Supporting Actress	Dominique Lavanant	Nominated
