= The Under-Gifted =

1980 film

- Theatrical release poster
- French: Les Sous-doués
- Directed by: Claude Zidi
- Written by: Claude Zidi; Didier Kaminka; Michel Fabre
- Produced by: Claude Zidi
- Starring: Michel Galabru; Maria Pacôme; Daniel Auteuil; Philippe Taccini; Hubert Deschamps; Raymond Bussières
- Cinematography: Paul Bonis
- Edited by: Nicole Saulnier
- Music by: Bob Brault
- Production company: Films 7
- Distributed by: AMLF
- Release date: 30 April 1980 (France)
- Running time: 92 minutes
- Country: France
- Language: French

The Under-Gifted (French: Les Sous-doués) is a 1980 French teen comedy film directed by Claude Zidi.

== Synopsis ==
The students of the Louis XIV Lycée are known to constantly fail the Baccalauréat test, the school is the last in the baccalauréat ranking with 100% of failures.

Indeed, they voluntarily have bad results in order to be able to continue having fun as students. They make many pranks including small crimes. However, Lucie Jumaucourt, the director, decides to increase the school discipline. Although she seems to succeed in reframing them regularly, the director realizes that she and her teaching team made up of her husband, her daughter and the imposing Mr. Bruce (new sports teacher) are in turn victims of new pranks by the students by way of retaliation. In the meantime, a new pupil, Gaston Pourquier, who has the particularity of being very old, joins the class during the year. During this time, Bébel will spend part of the year flirting with Caroline, Julien's girlfriend, but the latter, exasperated, successively sends her friend Ruth and the nymphomaniac Jeanne to her bed. The latter, after having had relations with many school friends, finds herself pregnant.

Exasperated by the students' lack of results, the headmistress takes new measures by installing a learning machine in the school. The machine teaches students by corporal punishment. Bébel, to end this brutality, calls the police to report a bomb threat, and the school is evacuated. But this strategy will not work for very long and the students decide at the bar to make one with firecrackers placed in a couscous pot. However, the bartender, who is a terrorist, overhears the conversation and is inspired to make one to bomb an embassy. There was exchange between a schoolboy firecracker and an authentic terrorist bomb, both hidden in a couscous pot. The real bomb exploded in the school. The city mayor make an offer to the students: pass the exam or go to prison. The commisiare, who the gang pranked by calling him anonymously on the phone for fake bomb threats, is put in charge of watching them.

Although the students were not prepared for the exam, they found very innovative methods of cheating: books below shoe bottom, djembe drums, overhead projectors, birth delivery just during the exam, and everyone passed, in spite efforts to control cheating.

Ten years later, they have all succeeded in life: Bébel runs a cinema newspaper, Julien has become a very BCBG specialized doctor married to Caroline with whom he had eight children, Jeanne the nymphomaniac runs a dating club, Gaëtan is an inspector for the repression of fraud, Togo the African is president of his native country and Graffiti, an expert in theft of mopeds, has become the boss of a garage of luxury car. The exception was the police officer now degraded to ordinary traffic policeman. He was invited by Bébel to celebrate the tenth birthday of the daughter of Jeanne and therefore also the 10 years of their baccalaureate since Jeanne had carefully chosen to give birth in the examination room.

== Cast ==
- Michel Galabru as the commissaire
- Maria Pacôme as Lucie Jumaucourt
- Hubert Deschamps as Léon Jumaucourt
- Daniel Auteuil as Baptiste "Bebel" Lavalle
- Philippe Taccini as Julien Senquin
- Catherine Erhardy as Jeanne Hamilton
- Tonie Marshall as Catherine Jumaucourt
- Françoise Michaud as Caroline

== Sequel ==
A sequel, Les Sous-doués en vacances, was released in 1982.
