= Roland Moreno =

French inventor, engineer, and author

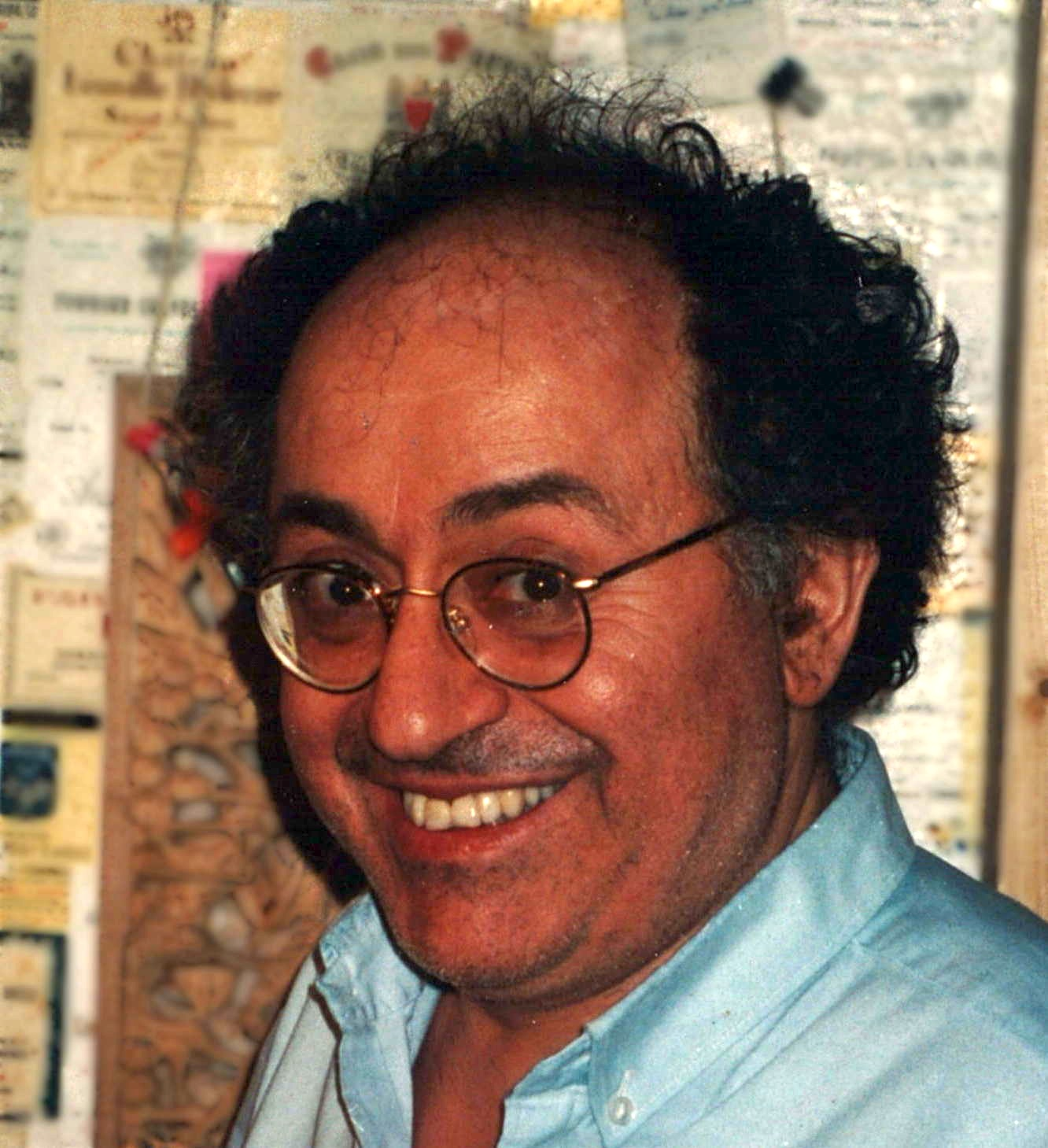
- Roland Moreno
- Born: June 11, 1945; Cairo, Egypt
- Died: April 29, 2012 (aged 66); Paris, France
- Occupations: Inventor, Engineer
- Known for: Inventor of the smart card
- Awards: Legion of Honour (France); Other notable awards

Roland Moreno (11 June 1945 – 29 April 2012) was a French inventor, engineer, humorist and author who was the inventor of the smart card. Moreno's smart card, or la carte à puce in French, was little known internationally. However, he became a national hero in France and was awarded the Légion d'Honneur in 2009.

== Biography ==
=== Early life and career ===
Moreno was born in Cairo, Egypt, to Egyptian Jewish parents on 11 June 1945. His original last name was Bahbout, but the family changed their surname to Moreno when they moved to France when he was very young. He attended the Montaigne and Condorcet schools in Paris and passed the baccalauréat, but dropped out early, and described his education as "self taught" for the rest of his life. Moreno worked in several smaller jobs after leaving school. He worked as a young reporter for Détective Magazine and a runner for the L'Express news magazine. From 1970 to 1972 Moreno was also an editor at Chimie-Actualités, a French chemistry magazine.

=== Smart card ===
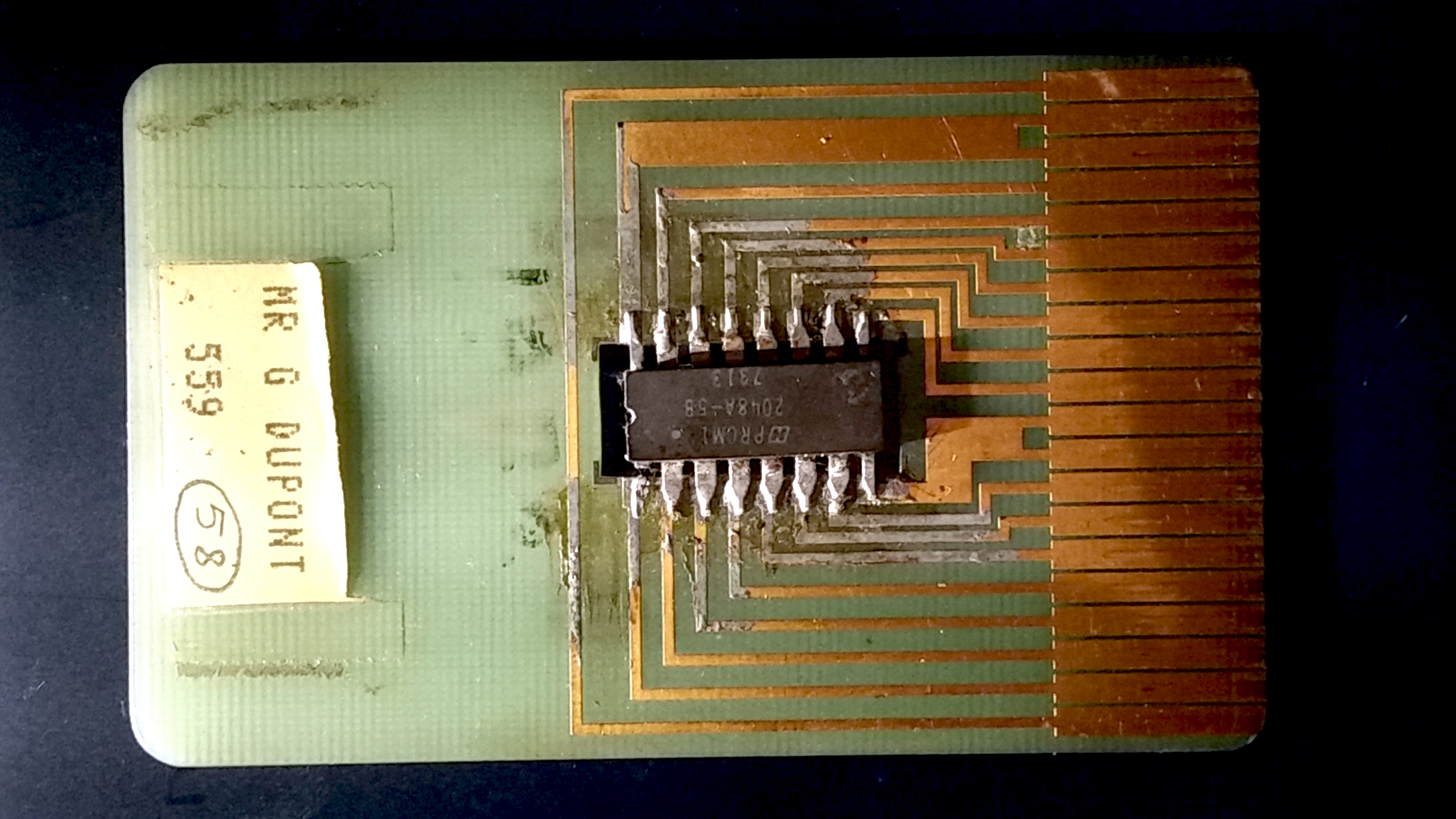
Moreno's smart card prototype (1975)

After leaving Chimie-Actualités, Moreno founded his own company, Innovatron, to market ideas and intellectual property. He successfully marketed a software system which merged dictionary words to create new product or brand names for companies. The idea would later be licensed by the Nomen company. Companies which used this particular invention included Wanadoo, the Thales Group and Vinci.

The smart chip would prove to be Moreno's most important invention. Moreno gave accounts of the conception of the smart card that differ from the later account of having conceived the idea in a dream. In a 1988 interview with Paris Match, he described the idea of memory coming to him late one night while he was smoking a cannabis joint. During the conference “Puces et bio-puces” at the Conservatoire national des arts et métiers on September 7, 2000 , Moreno again stated that he had had the idea while smoking a joint. In response to a question about his creative process, he said that he had previously given the same answer live on Michel Drucker’s television program, approximately four years earlier. He explained that he had been thinking extensively about problems of memory and information storage before this particular moment. In contrast, in a 2006 interview with France Soir, Moreno said that the idea had come to him in a dream." He code-named his earliest smart card project as TMR, short for the 1969 comedic film Take the Money and Run, as Moreno was a huge fan of American film director Woody Allen. He later flipped the letters to RMT as the name of Innovatron's research and development department.

His original idea was for a signet ring, or smart ring, embedded with a microchip as shown in his first patent filed on 25 March 1974, when he was just 29 years old. Moreno modeled the ring on the seal ring used by European nobility with an upside down microchip and external arms to transfer or read information. However, the idea proved both impractical and unpopular during the 1970s. Moreno then simplified the idea, introducing a plastic card with a microchip in 1975. He called it la carte à puce, literally the chip card in English, due to the small chip inserted into the plastic card. Moreno first demonstrated that the smart card could be used in electronic financial transactions in 1976, using a machine which he held together with meccano.

It took approximately eight years for Moreno's smart card to gain widespread use in France due to initial start-up costs. However, the smart card proved a huge success in France in the 1980s, where it became widespread long before other countries. In 1983, France Télécom introduced the smart card for use with its Télécarte pay phone payment cards. Nine years later, the French consumer banking industry implemented Moreno's microchip on the Carte Bleue, a national debit card system. The invention was slower to come into widespread use in Britain and the United States: American Express did not introduce the smart card-using Blue Card until 1999 and the London transport system did not issue a smart card encrypted card until the 2000s.

Moreno's smart card, and its increased use, was met with criticism from activists and privacy groups. There were concerns, which continue to the present day, that the smart cards could have security flaws or could be used in illegal surveillance. Moreno recognized and acknowledged these concerns, saying that smart cards "have the potential to become Big Brother's little helper." In 2000, Moreno held a contest offering one million French francs to anyone who could break his security codes within 90 days; no one succeeded.

While Moreno may have lacked international name recognition, his invention made him very wealthy. His company, Innovatron, has made approximately €150m, nearly $192 million, in royalty payments, from the smart card and its licenses. In 2005, Moreno noted, "I can stop anyone on the street in Paris and they'll have at least three smart cards on them.

=== Other inventions ===
Moreno was very interested in music, broadcasting and writing. He launched Radio Deliro, a now defunct Internet radio station. He was credited as the inventor of several unorthodox electronic devices, including devices called le pianok, calculette, and Pièce-o'matic. His additional inventions included the Matapof, which was able to electronically and numerically simulate the heads or tails game.

=== Writings, acting and other pursuits ===
Moreno wrote several books, including Théorie du Bordel Ambiant, a collection of his ideas and reflections. He also authored books under the literary pseudonym Laure Dynateur, including a cookbook entitled L'Aide-Mémoire du Nouveau Cordon-bleu with more than 2,000 recipes. Moreno chose this pseudonym because, when pronounced, the name sounds like the French word for computer: l'ordinateur. Moreno also had several small acting and cameo roles in French cinema. He was cast in the 1982 comedic film Les Sous-doués en vacances, directed by Claude Zidi, as a "mad inventor" character who invents a "love computer."

Despite his recognitions in France, Moreno, who has been variously described as a "nutty professor", once told the France Soir newspaper that his greatest hypothetical honor would be a wax likeness of himself in the Musée Grévin.

=== Personal life and later years ===
Moreno married Stephany Stolin in December 1976; the couple had two daughters, Marianne and Julia, who survive him. He died in Paris on 29 April 2012, at the age of 66. He had previously suffered a pulmonary embolism in 2008.
