= Pour cent briques, t'as plus rien... =

1982 film by Édouard Molinaro

Pour cent briques, t'as plus rien
- Directed by: Édouard Molinaro
- Written by: Didier Kiminka; Édouard Molinaro (adaptation & dialogue)
- Screenplay by: Didier Kaminka
- Based on: Didier Kaminka (D'après la pièce de théâtre de)
- Produced by: Dany Cohen; Yvon Guézel
- Starring: Daniel Auteuil; Gérard Jugnot; Anémone
- Cinematography: Michael Epp
- Edited by: Marie-Josée Audiard
- Music by: Murray Head
- Production companies: TF1 Films Productions; Uranium Films
- Distributed by: UGC Distribution
- Release date: 12 May 1982
- Running time: 83 minutes
- Country: France
- Language: French

Pour cent briques, t'as plus rien... (English title: For 200 Grand, You Get Nothing Now) is a 1982 French comedy film directed by Édouard Molinaro and starring Daniel Auteuil, Gérard Jugnot and Anémone.

== Plot ==
After getting screwed over by life again, two losers decide that enough is enough. Using stolen ski masks and stolen toy guns, they take hostages in their local bank, holding them for ransom. Things go well until the hostages learn what's going on and demand a piece of the action for themselves.

== Cast ==
- Daniel Auteuil as Sam
- Gérard Jugnot as Paul
- Anémone as Nicole
- Jean-Pierre Castaldi as Henri
- François Perrot as Le directeur
- Paul Barge as Jean-Louis
- Annick Blancheteau as Odette
- Élisa Servier as Caroline
- Eric Legrand as Hubert
- Darry Cowl as Le concierge flic
- Georges Géret as Bouvard
- Bruno Garcin as L'adjoint de Bouvard
- Fernand Berset as Le patron de Sam
- Stéphanie Fugain as Patricia
- Isabelle Mergault as Ginette
- Pascal Ternisien as Etienne, l'apprenti
- Roland Monod as Le ministre
- Jena-Claude de Goros as Himself
- Michel Chalmeau as Himself
- Pierre Aknine as Himself
- Jean-Marie Arnoux as Himself
- Henri Attal as Himself
- Catherine Belkhodja as Himself
- Jack Benard as Himself
- Jean Cherlian as Himself
- Alain Chevallier as Himself
- Catherine Gautier as Himself
- Daniel Koenigsberg as Himself (as Daniel Kenigsberg)
- Dominique Lablanche as Himself
- Robert Lestourneaud as Himself
- Antoine Mikola as Himself (as Antoine Michola)
- Joseph Momo as Himself
- Jean-Louis Tristan as Himself
- Michel Tugot-Doris as Himself

== See also ==
- List of French films of 1982
