= Les Sous-doués en vacances =

- Directed by: Claude Zidi
- Written by: Claude Zidi; Didier Kaminka; Michel Fabre
- Produced by: Claude Zidi
- Starring: Daniel Auteuil; Guy Marchand; Grace de Capitani; Charlotte de Turckheim; Hubert Deschamps
- Cinematography: Paul Bonis
- Edited by: Nicole Saunier; Olivier Mauffroy
- Music by: Vladimir Cosma
- Production company: Les Films 7
- Distributed by: AMLF
- Release date: 1982 (France)
- Running time: 85 minutes
- Country: France
- Language: French

Les Sous-doués en vacances (lit. 'The Under-Gifted on vacation') is a 1982 French comedy film, directed by Claude Zidi. It is the sequel to Les Sous-doués (1980). Daniel Auteuil as the protagonist, and three other actors playing his friends reprise their roles from the first film.

== Production ==
The film was shot between 10 August and 3 October 1981. Roland Moreno, the real life inventor of the smart card, was cast in the film as a "mad inventor" who creates a "love computer."

Florence Guérin recalls how she gave her first line to the cinema in this film: "After passing a day doing a walk-on part, I knew that the next day they needed a girl for a nude scene, but she had a line in it. I begged Claude Zidi, going in front of his boat and he gave in, telling me that maybe the scene would be cut and that they already had another actress. Finally I shot, the scene was not cut, and the end credits read: B.B 1: Florence Guérin."

Sandrine Bonnaire in an extra in the movie.

== Release ==
The film was released in 1982. It was shown in Paris for 22 weeks.
