= Peut-être =

- Theatrical release poster
- Directed by: Cédric Klapisch
- Written by: Santiago Amigorena; Alexis Galmot; Cédric Klapisch; Christian Vincent
- Produced by: Aïssa Djambri; Farid Lahoussa; Manuel Munz
- Starring: Jean-Paul Belmondo; Romain Duris; Géraldine Pailhas; Julie Depardieu
- Cinematography: Philippe Le Sourd
- Edited by: Francine Sandberg
- Music by: Loïc Dury; Mathieu Dury
- Production companies: Vertigo Productions; PECF; M6 Films; TPS Cinéma
- Distributed by: Warner Bros.
- Release date: 10 November 1999 (France)
- Running time: 109 minutes
- Country: France
- Language: French
- Budget: $13.8 million
- Box office: $4 million

Peut-être (Maybe; Perhaps) is a 1999 French science fiction comedy film. Directed by Cédric Klapisch with a budget of 75 million franc, the film runs for 109 minutes. It featured Romain Duris, Jean-Paul Belmondo, Géraldine Pailhas and Julie Depardieu. The film premiered at a Buck Rogers-themed New Year's Eve party.

== Plot ==
After having sex with his girlfriend Lucie (Pailhas) in a bathroom, Arthur (Duris) discovers that a ceiling panel is a time portal to the Paris in the future, although it appears more like a sun-baked desert city by that point. There he meets an old man named Ako (Belmondo) who turns out to be Arthur's son. Ako attempts to persuade Arthur to impregnate Lucie so that he can exist in this future.

== Cast ==
- Jean-Paul Belmondo as Ako
- Romain Duris as Arthur
- Géraldine Pailhas as Lucie
- Julie Depardieu as Nathalie
- Lorànt Deutsch as Prince Fur
- Emmanuelle Devos as Juliette
- Léa Drucker as Clotilde
- Vincent Elbaz as Philippe
- Hélène Fillières as Rosemonde
- Olivier Gourmet as Jean-Claude
- Riton Liebman as Mathieu
- Marceline Loridan-Ivens as Madeleine
- Olivier Py as Green Man
- Jocelyn Quivrin as The Martian
- Liliane Rovère as Marie-Jeanne
- Zinedine Soualem as Kader
- Jean-Pierre Bacri as The father
- Élisa Servier as The mother
- Cathy Guetta as The DJ
- Olivia Del Rio as The naked girl
