= An Ordinary Case =

- Theatrical release poster
- French: Le Fil
- Directed by: Daniel Auteuil
- Screenplay by: Daniel Auteuil; Steven Mitz
- Based on: Le Livre de Maître Mô by Jean-Yves Moyart
- Produced by: Nelly Auteuil; Hugo Gélin
- Starring: Daniel Auteuil; Grégory Gadebois; Sidse Babett Knudsen; Alice Belaïdi
- Cinematography: Jean-François Hensgens
- Edited by: Valérie Deseine
- Music by: Gaspar Claus
- Production companies: Zazi Films; Zack Films; France 2 Cinéma; Zinc
- Distributed by: Zinc
- Release dates: 21 May 2024 (Cannes); 11 September 2024 (France)
- Running time: 115 minutes
- Country: France
- Language: French
- Budget: €6.4 million

An Ordinary Case (French: Le Fil, lit. 'The Thread') is a 2024 French legal drama film co-written, directed and starring Daniel Auteuil. The screenplay was written by Auteuil with Steven Mitz and is an adaptation of Le Livre de Maître Mô, a book of the legal experiences of the French criminal lawyer and blogger Jean-Yves Moyart. Auteuil stars as a lawyer hired to defend a client accused of his wife's murder.

The film had its world premiere in the Special Screenings section at the 77th Cannes Film Festival on 21 May 2024. It was theatrically released on 11 September 2024 by Zinc.

== Plot ==
Jean Monier, a troubled lawyer, agrees to represent a client named Nicolas Milik. The latter has been accused of murdering his wife. While trying to prove his client's innocence, Monier finds himself more and more involved in the case.

== Cast ==
- Daniel Auteuil as Maître Jean Monier
- Grégory Gadebois as Nicolas Milik
- Sidse Babett Knudsen as Maître Annie Debret
- Alice Belaïdi as Avocate Générale Adèle Houri
- Suliane Brahim as Maître Judith Goma
- Gaëtan Roussel as Roger Marton
- Isabelle Candelier as President Violette Mangin
- Florence Janas as Laure Marton
- Aurore Auteuil as Audrey Girard
- Charlie Nelson as Antiquer

== Reception ==
=== Box office ===
In France, the film sold a total of 688,297 admissions.
