= Gilbert Lesage =

Quaker charity worker and philanthropist

- Born: May 19, 1910; Paris, France
- Died: November 7, 1989 (aged 79)
- Occupation: Chef du Service social des étrangers (SSE) [Head of the Social Department for Aliens]
- Known for: Relief and rescue of Jews in France in World War II

Gilbert Robert Louis Lesage (19 May 1910 – 7 November 1989) was a Quaker charity worker and philanthropist who helped refugees before the Second World War and was responsible clandestinely for saving the lives of many Jews in southern France while working as the head of the Social Department for Aliens under the Vichy regime.

== Early life ==
The son of Robert Joseph Paul Lesage, an architect born in 1874 in Rouen, and Marie Marguerite Lesage (born Morel), a musician born in 1873 in Saint Denis de la Réunion, Gilbert Lesage attended the Lycée de Falaise (Calvados), taking his baccalauréat lettres in 1926. His philosophy studies at the Lycée Rollin (now the Collège-lycée Jacques-Decour) in Paris were undertaken somewhat half-heartedly in competition with his own research in languages and ethnology, and a course he took in hotel management. Following a chance meeting with Ella Barlow at the Société des Amis in Paris in 1929 he became a committed Quaker.

== Career ==
Notwithstanding his pacifism, he undertook his military service in 1931–2. In late 1932 he became a member of the Quaker association Entraide européenne and went to Germany, working on the charity's behalf in Berlin from late 1932 until early 1933 when he was arrested and expelled from the country by the Nazis. In 1933, through Jack Hayland, Lesage was offered a bursary to study for a year at Woodbrooke College, the Quaker study centre in Birmingham, but the Entraide team recalled him to Paris in late 1933 to help reorganize the "foyer" for German, Jewish or political refugees in the rue de la Pierre Levée and to set up regional departments to welcome refugees and find them employment, especially by steering them to départements where there was no unemployment. Lesage worked for the French branch of the Service Civil International (SCI) from 10 January 1938 to 27 August 1939 and became its deputy secretary general. In this period he also served as a director of Pax Colony at the château de Soisy-sur-Seine, where accommodation was being provided for Spanish refugees fleeing the Spanish Civil War and Franco. Just as the Second World War was about to break out, Lesage was called up in August 1939. Following the armistice, he was demobilized on 12 July 1940 and decided to make his way to Vichy to see if he could be of service to the community under the new French government.

=== Vichy and the Service social des étrangers (1941–4) ===
Following a chance encounter in Vichy with his friend M. Laborie, Lesage was appointed head of mission of the newly formed Compagnons de France under the Ministry for Family and Youth, swiftly rising to head of department first in Vichy and then in Lyon. Other appointments quickly followed one another. In October 1940, Lesage was appointed inspector general of the Refugee department under the Ministry of the Interior. On 6 January 1941, Lesage was made director of the department for refugees under the director general of the Sûreté nationale. Then barely more than six weeks later, on 19 February, Lesage was chosen to head the newly created Service social des formations d'étrangers that would in November of that same year become the Service social des étrangers (SSE) [Social Department for Aliens]. This appointment was made by Henri Maux, who led the Commissariat de la lutte contre le chômage (CLC), a body formed in October 1940 to combat high unemployment across the nation. Maux was in charge of the CLC in France's southern unoccupied zone. During its three years' existence, the CLC was successful in significantly reducing unemployment.

The SSE, created within the southern zone of the CLC, grew from a staff of 14 in July 1941 when first active to some 350 by 1944, and its budget grew from 24,800 francs in 1941 to 74 million francs in 1944. Besides the regular staff, Lesage worked clandestinely on behalf of refugees with "agents camouflés", such as Léon Meiss, Jean Pochard, Charles Morani and Jean-Philippe Bloch. On 1 January 1943, the SSE became the Contrôle social des étrangers and with the closure of the CLC was attached on May 1 to the Ministry of Labour and its head office moved from Vichy to Paris. From July 1943 the Contrôle social des étrangers was entrusted with the management of the camps of the Ministry of the Interior.

Lesage was actively involved throughout his employment in helping Polish refugees. He warned them of possible police raids and enabled many of them to cross the border into Spain to join up with active Polish forces. For this work Lesage was awarded the Polish Cross of Merit with Swords in 1945.

In August 1942 the Vichy authorities began arresting Jews in France's unoccupied southern zone. Lesage learnt on 16 August of a large-scale "ramassage" or rounding-up planned and decided to warn Jewish and other rescue organizations of the impending raid. In particular he warned Édouard Simon who ran the children's home of the Éclaireurs israélites de France at Moissac. A few days later, assisted by Amitiés chrétiennes, Dr Joseph Weill of the Œuvre de secours aux enfants (OSE) and Alexandre Glasberg (Abbé Glasberg), Lesage was personally able to make a case for exemption for more than 400 Jews at a camp in a disused barracks at Vénissieux near Lyon and thus save them from deportation. Now that exemption from deportation of children under the age of 18 had been cancelled, Lesage decided to go by an official directive of a few days earlier that stated that "when interested parties do not request to take their children with them, the latter shall be put in the care of the Social Department for Aliens". On the night of 28 August, Lesage and various social bodies attempted to persuade parents at the camp to entrust them with their children. In this way he was able to save 104 Jewish children, who were safely taken to the premises of the Éclaireurs israélites at Lyon. The same method was used in other camps where Jews were concentrated; near Clermont-Ferrand, Limoges, Macon and Montluçon.

Lesage's behaviour aroused suspicion and he was reported to the occupying authorities in Paris. On 8 April 1944, he was arrested by the Gestapo and interned at the Caserne des Tourelles, Paris. He had the good fortune to escape deportation, being set free by the Résistance in autumn 1944. According to René Nodot, Gilbert Lesage had saved the lives of some 100,000 refugees.

=== Post-war years ===
After the war, Lesage held various functions, among them: regional director in British and American-occupied Germany of the United Nations Relief and Rehabilitation Administration (UNRRA) and of the International Refugee Organization (IRO) (for displaced persons and refugees); journalist for Les Routiers in London; director of the Office intercommunal d'HLM de Briey (near Metz), managing Le Corbusier's third Cité Radieuse (built in 1959–1961); property negotiator at the time of the transfer of Les Halles wholesale fresh food market to Rungis. In later life he deposited archival material at the Centre de documentation juive contemporaine (C.D.J.C.) at the Mémorial de la Shoah in Paris.

== Honours ==
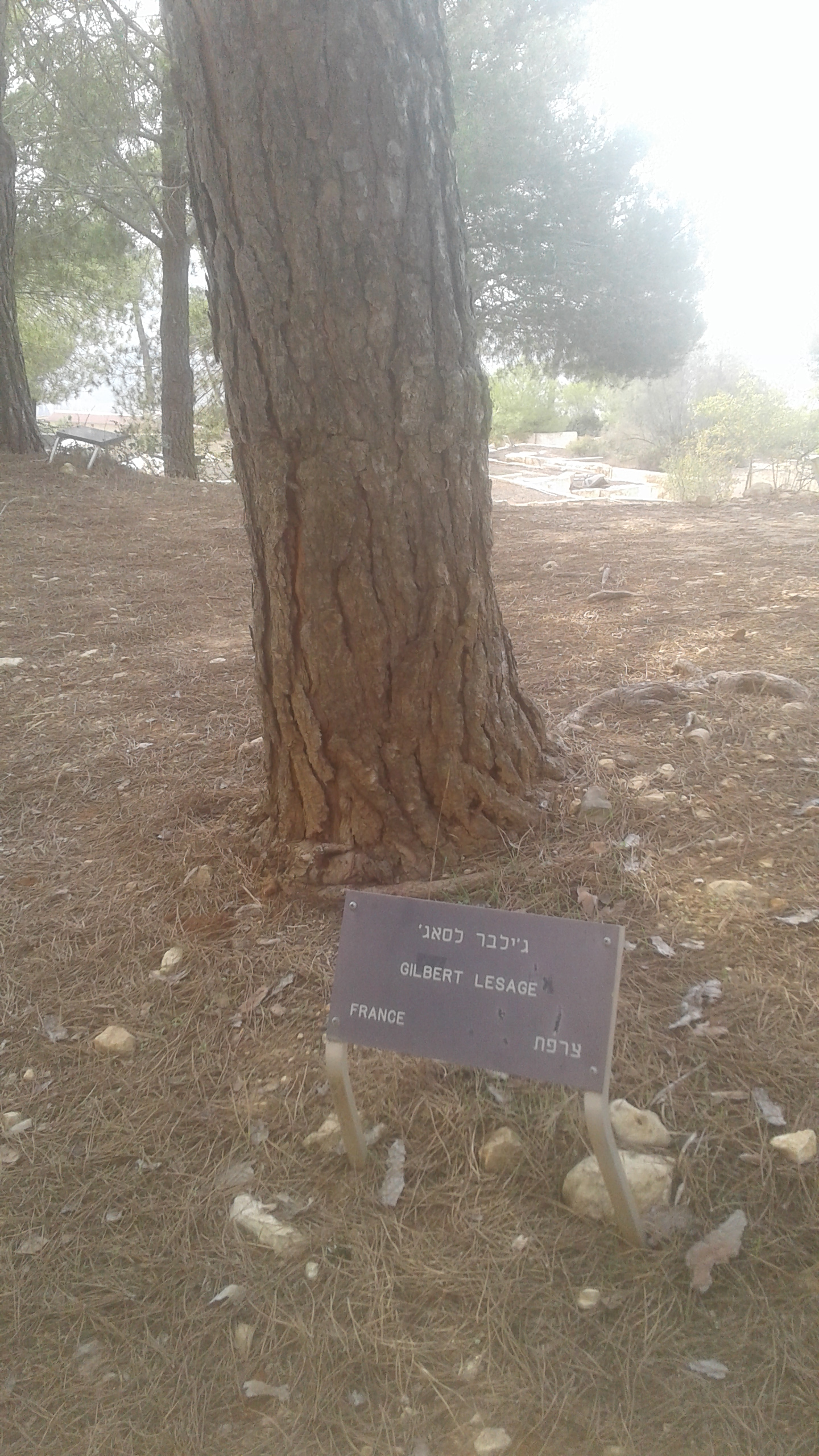
Righteous Among the Nations tree for Gilbert Lesage at Yad Vashem

- July 1945 Polish Cross of Merit with Swords
- 14 January 1985, Yad Vashem recognized Gilbert Lesage as Righteous Among the Nations. Commemorated with a tree.

== Film dramatization ==
- La Résistance is a French documentary combining archive footage and dramatization. It was produced in two instalments in 2007 by Félix Olivier with a screenplay by Andrew Bampfield and Christophe Nick, and released in 2008. In the second instalment, Quand il fallait sauver les juifs, Francis Leplay acts the part of Gilbert Lesage. See film online.
