= After You... =

- Film poster
- Directed by: Pierre Salvadori
- Written by: Benoît Graffin; David Léotard; Pierre Salvadori
- Produced by: Philippe Martin
- Starring: Daniel Auteuil; José Garcia; Sandrine Kiberlain
- Cinematography: Gilles Henry
- Edited by: Isabelle Devinck
- Music by: Camille Bazbaz
- Distributed by: Mars Distribution
- Release date: 18 October 2003
- Running time: 110 minutes
- Country: France
- Language: French
- Budget: $8.7 million
- Box office: $15 million

After You... (French: Après vous) is a 2003 French film directed by Pierre Salvadori and stars Daniel Auteuil, José Garcia, and Sandrine Kiberlain. The film won an Etoile d'Or in the Best Actor category for Auteuil and also a nomination for a César Award for Best Actor.

== Plot ==
Antoine (Daniel Auteuil), a head waiter, takes a shortcut through a park one night and spots a young man named Louis attempting to kill himself. He saves him but that henceforth the suicidal man clings to him and asks more and more of him.

== Cast ==
- Daniel Auteuil as Antoine Letoux
- José Garcia as Louis
- Sandrine Kiberlain as Blanche Grimaldi; Louis's ex-girlfriend
- Marilyne Canto as Christine; Antoine's girlfriend
- Michèle Moretti as Martine
- Garance Clavel as Karine
- Fabio Zenoni as André
- Jocelyne Desverchère as Sandrine the florist
- Didier Menin as the man at the Thai restaurant
- Jean-Claude Lecas as the cook*Blandine Pélissier as the nurse
- Jean-Charles Dumay as Serge the restaurateur
- Ange Ruzé as the young waiter
- Élise Otzenberger as the hairdresser
- Jean-Luc Abel as the inspector

== Awards and nominations ==
César Awards (France)

- Nominated: Best Actor (Daniel Auteuil)
