= The Man on the Train (2002 film) =

- Theatrical release poster
- Directed by: Patrice Leconte
- Written by: Claude Klotz
- Produced by: Philippe Carcassonne
- Starring: Johnny Hallyday; Jean Rochefort
- Cinematography: Jean-Marie Dreujou
- Edited by: Joëlle Hache
- Music by: Pascal Estève
- Production companies: Ciné B; Zoulou Films; Rhône-Alpes Cinéma; FCC; Tubedale Films; Pandora Filmproduktion; Cinéma Parisien; Media Suits
- Distributed by: Pathé Distribution (France, United Kingdom and Ireland); Alamode Film Distribution OHG (Germany); Wise Policy (Cinéma Parisien) (Japan)
- Release dates: 2 September 2002 (Venice); 2 October 2002 (France)
- Running time: 90 minutes
- Countries: France; United Kingdom; Germany; Japan
- Language: French
- Budget: €5 million
- Box office: $7.7 million

The Man on the Train (French: L'homme du train), called Man on the Train in the USA, is a 2002 drama film directed by Patrice Leconte that stars Jean Rochefort and Johnny Hallyday.

== Plot ==
In a little French town, a rough-looking man named Milan arrives alone by train. Suffering a headache, he goes into the pharmacy for aspirin and there meets Manesquier, a cultured bachelor who lives in a large house on his own. As the only hotel has closed, Manesquier offers to put the stranger up for the night. While he is delighted to talk about his life and interests, the taciturn Milan does not say who he is or why he is there. The reason, it is revealed, is because he will link up with three other criminals and rob the town bank.

Over the next few days the two very different men start bonding, with Milan introduced to music and poetry and the aesthete Manesquier learning to be tough with women and other men. On the Saturday each is to meet his fate: Manesquier will undergo triple bypass surgery while Milan will join his fellow-criminals in holding up the bank. The robbery is a failure, as the police have been tipped off and Milan is shot down. The operation is also a failure; as Manesquier dies on the table.

In a brief surrealistic coda, each dead man returns to life and their improbable friendship resumes.

== Cast ==
- Johnny Hallyday as Milan, a thief
- Jean Rochefort as Manesquier, a retired teacher
- Jean-François Stévenin as Luigi, a thief
- Charlie Nelson as Max
- Pascal Parmentier as Sadko
- Isabelle Petit-Jacques as Viviane, Manesquier's mistress
- Édith Scob as Manesquier's sister

== Production ==
The film was shot in Annonay (Ardèche), at the Gare de Tain-l'Hermitage - Tournon in Tain-l'Hermitage (Drôme) and at the Musée des Beaux-Arts and Fourvière in Lyon.

== Release ==
Paramount Classics acquired the United States distribution rights of this film and gave it a limited US theatrical release on May 9, 2003 to a total of 85 theaters; this film went on to gross $2,542,020 in United States theaters, which is a solid result for a non-English language film. Paramount Classics was ecstatic with this film's performance in the United States market.

== Reception ==
On the review aggregator website Rotten Tomatoes, 92% of 115 critics' reviews are positive. The website's consensus reads: "A lovely, contemplative character study with two wonderful performances at its center." Metacritic, which uses a weighted average, assigned the film a score of 75 out of 100, based on 36 critics, indicating "generally favorable" reviews.

=== Accolades ===
The film won the audience awards at the Venice Film Festival for "Best Film" and "Best Actor" (Jean Rochefort) in 2002.

== English-language remake ==
In 2011, an English-language remake of this film was released, starring Donald Sutherland as the professor and Larry Mullen, Jr. as the thief.
