= The Closet (2001 film) =

2001 French film by Francis Veber

The Closet (Le Placard)
- French film poster
- Directed by: Francis Veber
- Written by: Francis Veber
- Produced by: Patrice Ledoux
- Starring: Daniel Auteuil; Gérard Depardieu; Thierry Lhermitte
- Cinematography: Luciano Tovoli
- Edited by: Georges Klotz
- Music by: Vladimir Cosma
- Production companies: Gaumont; EFVE Films; TF1 Films Production
- Distributed by: Gaumont Buena Vista International
- Release date: 17 January 2001
- Running time: 84 minutes
- Country: France
- Language: French
- Budget: $14.5 million
- Box office: $50.1 million

The Closet (French: Le placard) is a 2001 French comedy film written and directed by Francis Veber. It is about a man who pretends to be homosexual to keep his job, with absurd and unexpected consequences.

== Plot ==
François Pignon, an unassuming divorced man with a teenage son who ignores him, lives a quiet and unremarkable life as an accountant in a rubber factory. On the factory photoshooting day he's left behind the scene. When he learns he's about to get downsized, he contemplates suicide, but his new neighbor Jean-Pierre Belone, a former industrial psychologist, dissuades him from jumping from his balcony and suggests a way to keep his position. Belone proposes that Pignon start a rumor he is homosexual by inserting his image in sexually provocative snapshots of a gay couple in a bar and anonymously mailing them to his factory's CEO, Mr. Kopel. The factory's primary product is condoms, so the gay community's support is essential, and Kopel will have to keep Pignon on the payroll to avoid charges of anti-homosexual bigotry.

Pignon does not change his usual mild and self-effacing behavior and mannerisms in any way as part of his masquerade. But his supervisors and co-workers begin to regard him in a new light, seeing him as exotic rather than dull, and his life becomes unexpectedly and dramatically better. Félix Santini, a homophobic co-worker who used to harass him, is warned he could be fired for discrimination if he continues to belittle Pignon, so he begins to make friendly overtures. However, when two of the workers notice him waiting for his son near the school entrance they start thinking Pignon is into children, and after talking to Pignon's colleague Ariana they attack him in his house parking, breaking his collarbone.

The company enters a float in a local gay pride parade, and Pignon is coerced into riding on it; his estranged son sees him in the televised broadcast of the parade and tells his mother. The son is thrilled to learn his father, whom he has always considered bland and boring, has a wilder side, and expresses an interest in spending more time with him. His suspicious ex-wife Christine invites Pignon to dinner and demands an explanation. He has by this point gained enough self-confidence to tell her exactly what he thinks of her.

Meanwhile, Santini's charade of friendship has developed into an obsessive attraction; his wife suspects him of having an affair when she finds a receipt for an expensive pink cashmere sweater, and leaves him when he buys Pignon chocolates. After this, Santini invites Pignon to move in with him. When Pignon turns him down, Santini snaps, a fight ensues, and Santini is fired and institutionalized to recover from his emotional breakdown.

Eventually, Pignon's ruse is discovered when Kopel catches him making wild love on the factory conveyor to his supervisor, Mlle Bertrand, in the middle of a factory tour held for Japanese guests. However, he has become so assertive that he keeps his job, relates to his son, patches up his relationship with Santini restoring the latter's employment, cheers up Belone, and lives happily ever after with Mlle Bertrand. The finale is similar to the starting scene, but now Pignon literally pushes his way back into the photo and (accidentally) his former offenders out of it, which results in a broken collarbone for one of them.

== Cast ==
- Daniel Auteuil as François Pignon, accountant
- Gérard Depardieu as Félix "Fé-fé" Santini, personnel director
- Thierry Lhermitte as Guillaume, communications director
- Michel Aumont as Jean-Pierre Belone, former industrial psychologist
- Michèle Laroque as Mademoiselle Bertrand, chief accountant
- Jean Rochefort as Kopel, CEO
- Laurent Gamelon as Alba
- Alexandra Vandernoot as Christine, François Pignon's ex-wife
- Michèle Garcia as Madame Santini, Félix Santini's wife
- Edgar Givry as Mathieu
- Armelle Deutsch as Ariane, assistant accountant
- Vincent Moscato as Ponce
- Thierry Ashanti as Victor
- Stanislas Forlani as Franck, François' and Christine's son

== Production ==
Exteriors were filmed in Chaville, Clamart, Suresnes, and central Paris. Interiors were shot in Studios Éclair in Epinay-sur-Seine.

== Release ==
The film was first released in France, Belgium, and Switzerland. Later the film was shown at the L'Alliance Française French Film Festival in Australia, the Miami Gay and Lesbian Film Festival, the Newport International Film Festival, and the Seattle International Film Festival, and went into limited release in the US.

== Reception ==
=== Critical reception ===
On the review aggregator website Rotten Tomatoes, 85% of 82 critics' reviews are positive, with an average rating of 7/10. The website's consensus reads: "A pleasant comedy with a great cast."

Stephen Holden of The New York Times called it "giddy social comedy" and "a classic French farce" and added, "What's so liberating about The Closet is its refusal to walk on politically correct eggshells. The target of its blunt lusty humor is as much exaggerated political correctness and the panic it can engender as it is bigotry."

Roger Ebert of the Chicago Sun-Times said, "The movie passes the time pleasantly and has a few good laughs ... But the screenplay relies too much on the first level of its premise and doesn't push into unexpected places. Once we get the setup, we can more or less anticipate the sitcom payoff, and there aren't the kinds of surprises, reversals and explosions of slapstick that made La Cage Aux Folles so funny. In the rating system of the Michelin Guide, it's worth a look, but not a detour or a journey."

Peter Travers of Rolling Stone called the film "a bonbon spiked with mirth and malice" and noted, "Auteuil and Depardieu spar hilariously, and writer-director Francis Veber, following The Dinner Game, offers another delicious treat."

Lisa Schwarzbaum of Entertainment Weekly rated the film A−, calling it a "cagey, high gloss comedy" and a "perfectly built French tickler."

=== Box office ===
The film grossed an estimated $25 million in France from more than 5 million admissions. It was the third highest-grossing film in France during 2001 behind Amélie and La Vérité si je mens ! 2. It grossed $6,678,894 in the US and Canada and $18 million in other foreign markets for a worldwide box office of $50,104,745.

== Awards and nominations ==
Daniel Auteuil was named Best Actor at the Shanghai International Film Festival.
