= Daniel Auteuil =

French actor and director (born 1950)

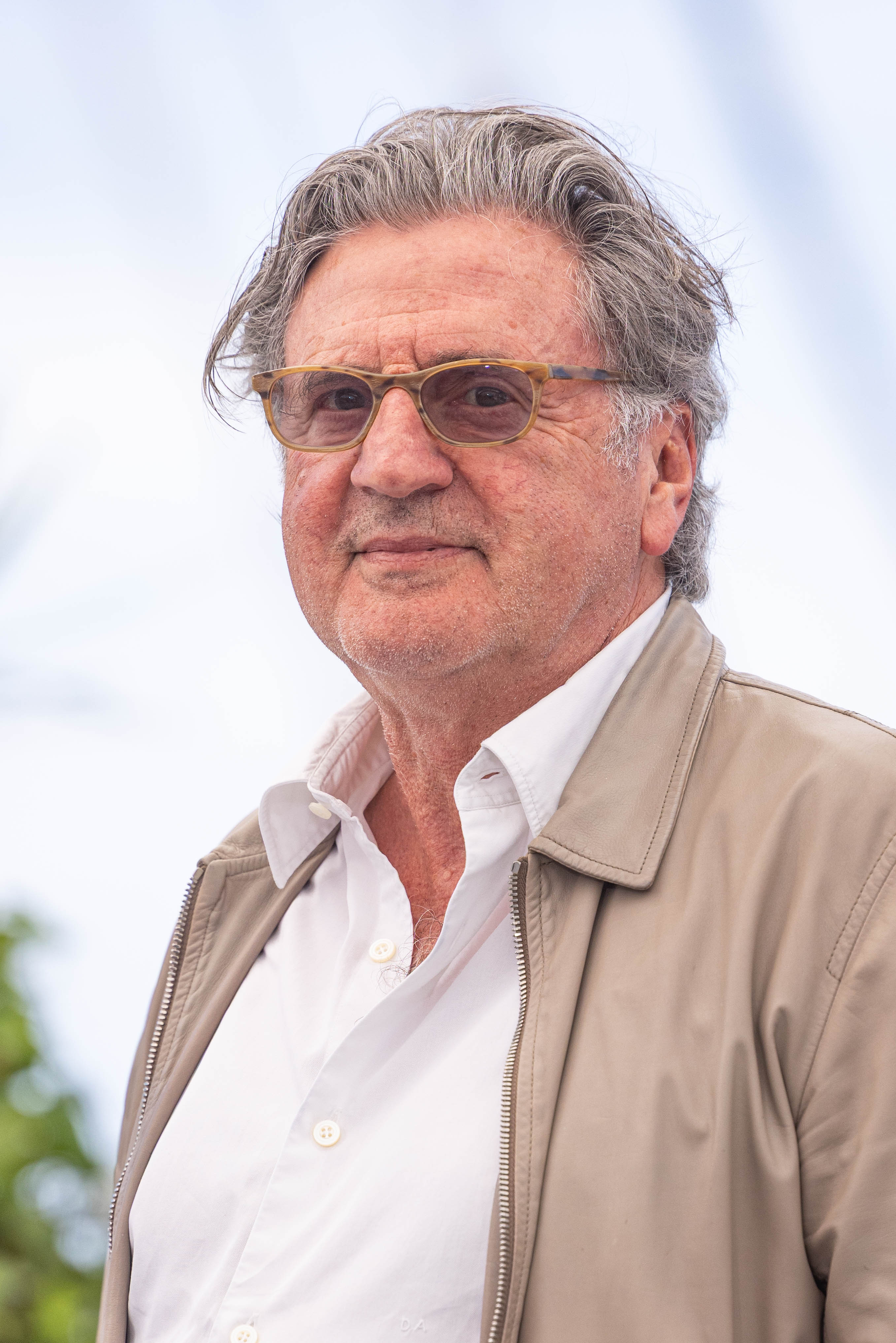
- Auteuil at the 2025 Cannes Film Festival
- Born: 24 January 1950 (age 76); Algiers, French Algeria
- Occupations: Actor, film director, screenwriter
- Years active: 1974–present
- Spouses: Anne Jousset (m. 1978–1984) Emmanuelle Béart (m. 1993–1995) Aude Ambroggi (m. 2006)
- Partner: Marianne Denicourt
- Children: 3; including Aurore Auteuil

Daniel Auteuil (French: [danjɛl otœj]; born 24 January 1950) is a French actor and director who has appeared in a wide range of film genres, including period dramas, romantic comedies, and crime thrillers. In 1996 he won the Best Actor Award at the Cannes Film Festival together with Belgian actor Pascal Duquenne for their work in The Eighth Day. He is also the winner of two César Awards for Best Actor, one in 1987 as Ugolin Soubeyran in Jean de Florette and Manon des Sources and one for his role in Girl on the Bridge. For his role in Jean de Florette he also won the BAFTA Award for Best Actor in a Supporting Role. Auteuil is considered one of France's most respected actors.

== Early life ==
Daniel Auteuil was born on 24 January 1950 in Algiers, French Algeria, the son of opera singers. He grew up in Avignon and Nancy, France. He began his acting career in musical comedy and made his film debut in 1972.

At age 16, thanks to André Benedetto, who led a company in Avignon, Auteuil began stage acting in Chekhov's La Demande en mariage. To please his parents he began studies in topography, and he worked in a nightclub cloakroom on Saturday nights to earn money.

In 1969, after attending high school in Avignon, he went to Paris with his friend Roger Miremont. He enrolled in a theatre course taught by Cours Florent. Despite several attempts, he was never accepted to the Conservatoire national supérieur d'art dramatique.

== Career ==
In 1970, he made his debut in théâtre national populaire in Early Morning. In 1972 and 1973 he appeared in the American musical Godspell. Partnered with Edwige Feuillère's theatre (La folle de Chaillot) and Maria Pacôme's theatre (Apprends-moi, Céline), he co-starred with François Périer in Coup de chapeau, which earned him the 1979 Gérard Philipe prize for the best actor in Parisian theatre of the year. He then appeared in Le Garçon d'appartement, which Gérard Lauzier adapted for the cinema in 1982 as T'empêches tout le monde de dormir.

In 1974, Auteuil made his debut on television under the direction of Marcel Jullian in the series Les Fargeot before continuing next to Rellys, Jackie Sardou and Fernand Sardou in Adieu Amélie by Jean-Paul Carrère. In 1977, he played the detective Camaret in the six-episode series Rendez-vous en noir, based on the novel by William Irish.

In 1975, Gérard Pirès offered Auteuil the lead role in L'Agression with Catherine Deneuve and Jean-Louis Trintignant.

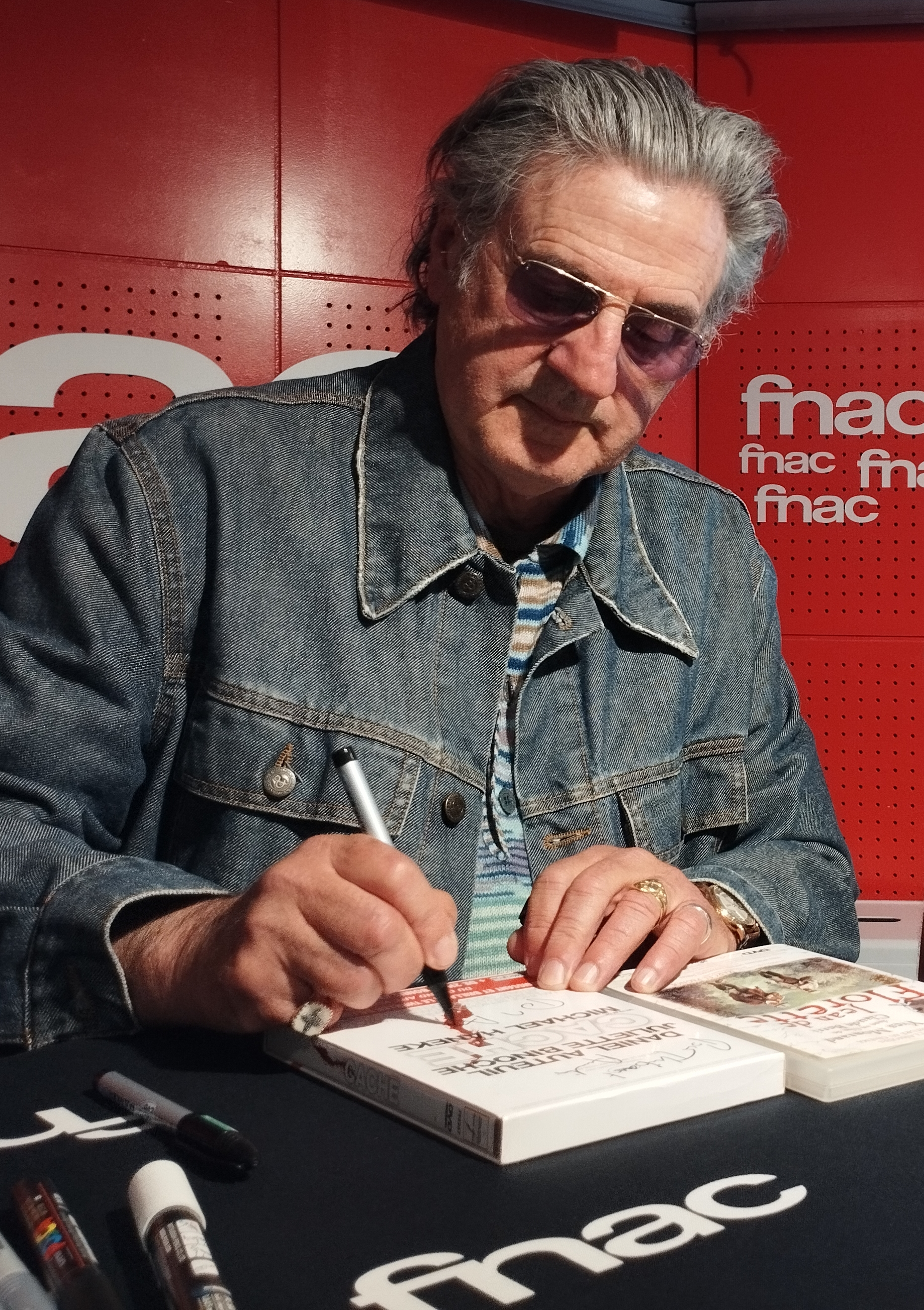
Auteuil signing a copy of Caché in 2023

Auteuil's starring role in the historical drama film Jean de Florette (1986) and its sequel Manon des Sources (1986) brought him international recognition. Auteuil has since become one of the best-known, best-paid and most popular actors in France. Through his appearances in films including the swashbuckler Le bossu (1997), the comedy The Closet (2001), the romantic comedy After You... (2003), the thriller Caché (2005) and the comedy My Best Friend (2006), he has since gained greater international recognition.

In 2013, Auteuil was selected as a member of the main competition jury at the 2013 Cannes Film Festival.

== Personal life ==
Auteuil has two daughters: Aurore Auteuil with his former partner, Anne Jousset, and Nelly from a ten-year relationship with actress Emmanuelle Béart, his co-star in the films A Heart in Winter and Manon des Sources (1986). He married Aude Ambroggi, a Corsican sculptor born in 1977, on 22 July 2006 in Porto-Vecchio, Corsica.

== Filmography ==
=== As filmmaker ===
Year	English Title	Original Title	Notes
2011	The Well-Digger's Daughter	La Fille du puisatier	
2013	Marius		
2013	Fanny		
2018	The Other Woman	Amoureux de ma femme	
2024	An Ordinary Case	Le Fil	
2026	When the Night Falls	Une nuit	

=== As actor ===
Year	Title	Role	Director
1974	L'Agression	Natacha's boyfriend	Gérard Pirès
1975	Attention les yeux!	Alex	Gérard Pirès
1977	Monsieur Papa	Dédé	Philippe Monnier
1977	Rendez-vous en noir	Inspecteur Camaret	Claude Grinberg
1979	An Adventure for Two	a rascal	Claude Lelouch
1979	Heroes Are Not Wet Behind the Ears	Jean-Bernard	Charles Nemes
1980	Les sous-doués	Bébel	Claude Zidi
1981	Les hommes préfèrent les grosses	Jean-Yves	Jean-Marie Poiré
1981	Les Sous-doués en vacances	Bébel	Claude Zidi
1981	Clara et les Chics Types	Mickey	Jacques Monnet
1982	Pour cent briques, t'as plus rien...	Sam	Édouard Molinaro
1984	Les Fauves	Christopher Bergham	Jean-Louis Daniel
1984	Asphalt Warriors	Inspecteur Vincent	Sergio Gobbi
1984	P'tit Con	Jeannot	Gérard Lauzier
1985	Palace	Lucien Molard	Édouard Molinaro
1986	Jean de Florette	Ugolin	Claude Berri
1986	Manon des Sources	Ugolin	Claude Berri
1987	Quelques jours avec moi	Martial Pasquier	Claude Sautet
1989	Romuald et Juliette	Romuald Blindet	Coline Serreau
1990	The Elegant Criminal	Lacenaire	Francis Girod
1991	A Heart in Winter	Stéphane	Claude Sautet
1991	My Life Is Hell	Abargadon	Josiane Balasko
1992	My Favorite Season	Antoine	André Téchiné
1993	La Reine Margot	Henri de Bourbon	Patrice Chéreau
1994	La Séparation	Pierre	Christian Vincent
1995	A French Woman	Louis	Régis Wargnier
1995	Thieves	Alex	André Téchiné
1995	Sostiene Pereira	Dr. Cardoso	Roberto Faenza
1996	The Eighth Day	Harry	Jaco Van Dormael
1996	Lucie Aubrac	Raymond	Claude Berri
1997	On Guard	Lagardère	Philippe de Broca
1999	Girl on the Bridge	Gabor	Patrice Leconte
1999	The Lost Son	Xavier Lombard	Chris Menges
1999	The Escort	Pierre	Michel Blanc
1999	The Widow of Saint-Pierre	Jean	Patrice Leconte
2000	Sade	Marquis de Sade	Benoît Jacquot
2001	Vajont	Alberico Biadene	Renzo Martinelli
2001	The Closet	François Pignon	Francis Veber
2002	The Adversary	Jean-Marc Faure	Nicole Garcia
2003	Rencontre avec le dragon	Guillaume de Montauban	Hélène Angel
2003	After You...	Antoine Letoux	Pierre Salvadori
2004	36 Quai des Orfèvres	Léo Vrinks	Olivier Marchal
2004	Strange Crime	Daniel	Roberto Andò
2005	Caché	Georges Laurent	Michael Haneke
2005	To Paint or Make Love	William Lasserre	Arnaud Larrieu and Jean-Marie Larrieu
2006	The Valet	Pierre Levasseur	Francis Veber
2006	My Best Friend	François Coste	Patrice Leconte
2006	Napoleon and Me	Napoleon	Paolo Virzì
2007	Conversations with My Gardener	Dupinceau	Jean Becker
2008	The Last Deadly Mission	Schneider	Olivier Marchal
2008	15 ans et demi	Philippe Le Tallec	François Desagnat & Thomas Sorriaux
2008	Me Two	Jean-Christian Ranu	Nicolas & Bruno
2009	Je l'aimais	Pierre	Zabou Breitman
2011	The Well-Digger's Daughter	Pascal Amoretti	Daniel Auteuil
2012	The Lookout	Mattei	Michele Placido
2012	Blood from a Stone	Georges Pierret	Jacques Maillot
2013	Jappeloup	Serge Durand	Christian Duguay
2013	Marius	César	Daniel Auteuil
2013	Fanny	César	Daniel Auteuil
2015	Entre amis	Richard	Olivier Baroux
2015	Nos femmes	Paul	Richard Berry
2016	Les Naufragés	Jean-Louis Brochard	David Charhon
2016	Au nom de ma fille	André Bamberski	Vincent Garenq
2016	The Confessions	Daniel Roché	Roberto Andò
2017	Le Brio	Pierre Mazard	Yvan Attal
2018	The Other Woman	Daniel	Daniel Auteuil
2018	Remi, Nobody's Boy	Vitalis	Antoine Blossier
2019	Qui m'aime me suive!	Gilbert	José Alcala
2019	La Belle Époque	Victor Drumond	Nicolas Bedos
2021	Farewell, Mr. Haffmann	Joseph Haffmann	Fred Cavayé
2022	The New Toy	Philippe Étienne	James Huth
2023	A Silence	François Schaar	Joachim Lafosse
2024	An Ordinary Case	Maître Jean Monier	Daniel Auteuil
2025	A Private Life	Gabriel Haddad	Rebecca Zlotowski

== Awards and nominations ==
Award	Year	Category	Work	Result	Ref.
British Academy Film Awards	1987	Best Actor in a Supporting Role	Jean de Florette	Won	
Cannes Film Festival	1996	Best Actor (Shared with Pascal Duquenne)	The Eighth Day	Won	
César Awards	1987	Best Actor	Jean de Florette	Won	
César Awards	1989	Best Actor	A Few Days with Me	Nominated	
César Awards	1991	Best Actor	Lacenaire	Nominated	
César Awards	1993	Best Actor	A Heart in Winter	Nominated	
César Awards	1994	Best Actor	My Favorite Season	Nominated	
César Awards	1995	Best Actor	La Séparation	Nominated	
César Awards	1997	Best Actor	The Eighth Day	Nominated	
César Awards	1998	Best Actor	On Guard	Nominated	
César Awards	2000	Best Actor	Girl on the Bridge	Won	
César Awards	2003	Best Actor	The Adversary	Nominated	
César Awards	2004	Best Actor	After You...	Nominated	
César Awards	2005	Best Actor	36 Quai des Orfèvres	Nominated	
César Awards	2018	Best Actor	Le Brio	Nominated	
César Awards	2020	Best Actor	La Belle Époque	Nominated	
David di Donatello Awards	1993	Best Foreign Actor	A Heart in Winter	Won	
European Film Awards	1993	Best Actor	A Heart in Winter	Won	
European Film Awards	2005	Best Actor	Caché	Won	
Lumière Awards	2001	Best Actor	Sade	Won	
Lumière Awards	2018	Best Actor	Le Brio	Nominated	
Lumière Awards	2020	Best Actor	La Belle Époque	Nominated	
Molière Awards	1988	Best Actor	Double Inconstancy	Nominated	
Molière Awards	1991	Best Actor	Scapin the Schemer	Nominated	
Molière Awards	2014	Best Actor	Nos Femmmes	Nominated	
