= Denis Waxin =

French serial killer and pedophile

- Born: Denis Georges Waxin; 26 June 1968 (age 58); Loos, Nord, France
- Convictions: Murder, rape
- Penalty: Life imprisonment plus 29 years preventative detention

Details
- Victims: 3
- Span of crimes: 1985–1992
- Country: France
- State: Hauts-de-France
- Date apprehended: 20 January 1999
- Imprisoned at: Loos Prison

Denis Georges Waxin (born 26 June 1968) is a French serial killer and serial rapist who attacked at least six children in Lille and its suburbs from 1985 to 1999, killing three girls, raping two boys and another girl. He was convicted for his proven crimes and sentenced to life imprisonment with 29 years of preventative detention.

== Early life ==
Denis Georges Waxin was born on 26 June 1968, in Loos, Nord, but spent his childhood in Wattignies. His parents had a strained relationship, as his mother Marie-Jeanne spent most of her time working, while his strict father never spoke to him and preferred to spend his time gambling. As he was given no affection from most of his other four siblings, with the sole exception of his older brother Dominique, Waxin grew up lonely and isolated from others around him.

In 1985, Waxin became depressed when Dominique, now an adult, left the family home. In an attempt to take his mind off his troubles, he began to take walks by himself every day for hours on end.

== Attacks ==
On the late afternoon of 22 November 1985, 7-year-old Nathalie Hoareau was sent to buy cigarettes and bread for her mother from the local store, but on the way, she was approached by Waxin, who offered to show her his shack. After Hoareau followed him to a vacant lot, Waxin raped the girl and attempted to strangle her with the candy necklace she wore around her neck, before ultimately stabbing her twice in the heart. Later that night, the concerned mother notified the police about the disappearance, which led them to discover the little girl's body in a bush. She had been left completely naked, with a pack of cigarettes and a shopping list with a written message to her mother beside the body. Traces of semen were also located on the body, but since most of it was washed away by the rain, authorities were unable to establish a genetic profile.

In July 1986, Waxin obtained a diploma in carpentry and was stationed in Germany as part of his military service in 1989. While on leave, he began a short-lived relationship with an older woman, which lasted until the end of service in August 1990. Shortly afterwards, he fell into depression again.

On 8 October 1990, 9-year-old Cathy Monchaux was playing in the garden of the family home in Wazemmes when her father called to go inside. Before she could do that, however, Waxin approached her and offered to buy her candy. Monchaux agreed and followed him to an abandoned soccer field, where she was raped and stabbed fourteen times after a failed escape attempt. When she failed to return home, her parents and older sister went out to look for her, and after an hour of searching, they called the police. On the following day, Monchaux's naked body was found by a man walking his dog.

Shortly after this crime, Waxin fell in love with another woman, whom he subsequently married and went to live with in an apartment in Moulins. Neither of them wanted children, and Waxin called his wife "Mom". He was described as helpful, charming and a good husband, and eventually managed to find a job at an Auchan service station in Villeneuve-d'Ascq. While regarded as punctual and conscientious, Waxin was also considered unpredictable - on one occasion, he emptied the magazine of an alarm pistol while aiming it at a thief. He would eventually be fired for threatening to set fire to the station because his boss had reprimanded him.

On the late afternoon of 23 July 1992, 4-year-old Nadjia Thebib was playing with other children in front of a dilapidated building where her grandmother, Meriem, lived, since her parents had recently separated. Suddenly, Waxin approached, picked her up and headed towards Ronchin, but as Thebib made no sound, people simply assumed that he was her uncle. Eventually, Thebib's aunt Anissa attempted to chase after him, but stumbled and lost sight of the abductor. Together with other family members, they went around the neighbourhood and searched for the girl before eventually contacting the police. The aunt provided a description of the kidnapper's clothes, saying that he wore a red T-shirt, sneakers and white sweatpants with red stripes, from which a facial composite was made.

In the meantime, Waxin raped Thebib before stabbing her in the neck and suffocating her with a plastic bag. About a week later, three boys playing on the outskirts of the city found her body under a tarp between some shrubbery, with her clothes folded under her. The coroner established that Thebib had been killed mere hours after her abduction, additionally finding semen traces that allowed authorities to establish a DNA profile of the killer.

== Investigation and arrest ==
Due to his apparent familiarity with the deserted areas, investigators concluded that the killer likely lived in Lille or the suburbs, as he was able to quickly move around without being seen. While the investigations were going on, Waxin raped two young boys in Moulins and Lambersart from November to December 1999. On 4 August 1997, Waxin was arrested for attempting to steal cutlery from a store with his wife. As per police procedure, he was photographed and a sample of his DNA was taken, but it is unclear if he served time for this offence.

On 6 January 1997, a 6-year-old girl named Wendy was collecting old coins with her sister and older brother in front of their house. After a while, they decided to separate so they could collect more efficiently, and Wendy was left alone to ask strangers if they had any coins. After some time, she asked Waxin, who was randomly passing by, and while he said that he had none, he claimed to have more at his house. After making sure that there was nobody else around, he took Wendy by the arm and led her down the street, claiming that it was a shortcut to his house. He instead took her to an abandoned factory in Fives and started undressing her, but was met with fierce resistance. However, Waxin then threatened that he would hit her with an electric baton and that he had already killed other little girls, which made her stop resisting.

After he finished raping her, Wendy calmly dressed herself and left, with Waxin following her and repeating to her that he would kill her if she told the police. He eventually left, with the crying Wendy found by a passing driver who took her to the police station. Owing to her good memory, investigators made a facial composite of the man, with Wendy saying that he wore a green jacket with a triangle in the back. A few days later, as she was looking out the window, Wendy noticed a man resembling her attacker passing by her house, who looked at and smiled at her. The authorities, who kept watch over the family household, immediately questioned the man and took his photograph, bringing along those of five others to see if Wendy recognized any of them. Upon being shown them, she immediately pointed to Waxin, who was not the suspicious man. Stunned, the investigators asked again, with Wendy reaffirming that it was him. Still unconvinced that it was him, as Waxin only had convictions for shoplifting, they only sent a message to his mailbox to come for an interrogation.

== Confessions and indictment ==
On 20 January 1999, a nervous Waxin went to the interrogation, stunning investigators with his resemblance to the sketch. Before they could even explain to him why they had summoned him, Waxin suddenly said that he was guilty before shutting up and refusing to speak any further. He was then put on a police lineup, where Wendy formally identified him as her assailant, which was further reinforced when a search of his apartment led to the location of the jacket described by the little girl, complete with the electric baton found in one of the pockets. Because of these findings, Waxin was indicted for rape and kidnapping of a minor only eight days later, for which he was interned at the Loos Prison to await trial.

As part of police procedure, his DNA was compared to that of Thebib's killer, which was found to be identical. Because of this, he was subsequently charged with her murder on 12 July. When questioned, he admitted to raping, strangled and suffocating her, but refused to sign a confession or speak, claiming that he first wanted to see a judge and talk to him about two additional murders. The following day, Waxin was taken to the office of Justice Christophe Ingrain, where he confessed to the rapes and murders of Thebib, Monchaux and Hoareau. When pressed for a motive, he claimed that he was drunk before each attack and wanted to avenge his own rape at age 12, when he was supposedly raped by a homeless man in a cabin. Waxin later retracted the rape statement, claiming that he had fabricated it in an attempt to get a more lenient sentence. On 20 July, he was additionally charged with the murders of Monchaux and Hoareau.

On the day of the announcement of the new charges, Waxin wrote a letter to the judge in which he reiterated his previous statements and described them in greater detail, claiming that the killed the girls because he feared that they would give birth to a monster like the one who raped him. In addition to that, he admitted to raping three more girls which he did not kill because they were "nice", as well as the rapes of the two boys in 1993. Despite his admissions, no records of the three additional rapes were found.

== List of known victims ==
Facts		Discovery		Identity	Age
Date	Place	Date	Place	Identity	Age
22 November 1985	Lille	22 November 1985	Lille	Nathalie Hoareau	7
8 October 1990	Wazemmes	9 October 1990	Wazemmes	Cathy Monchaux	9
23 July 1992	Moulins	29 July 1992	Ronchin	Nadjia Thebib	4
November 1993	Moulins	?	Moulins	Unknown	7
December 1993	Lambersart	?	Lambersart	Unknown	10
6 January 1999	Moulins	6 January 1999	Fives	Wendy (survived and ID'd Waxin)	6

== Trial and sentence ==
In May 2002, Waxin's trial for the murders of Monchaux and Thebib, as well as the rapes, began at the cour d'assises in Douai. During the proceedings, psychiatrists described him as a perverse egocentric who "sexualized a hatred born in early childhood". On 31 May, he was found guilty and sentenced to life imprisonment plus 30 years of preventative detention, which he immediately appealed.

On 9 September, Waxin's second trial for the murder of Hoareau began: he was judged separately since he was still a minor at the time. He was found guilty of her murder as well, and was sentenced to 20 years imprisonment, which he also appealed. In October 2003, his appeal in the Hoareau case was presented before the cour d'assises in Saint-Omer, which upheld the initial sentence.

Waxin's second appeal trial began in November 2003, again in Saint-Omer. When brought to the stand, he burst into tears and finally asked for forgiveness from the victims' family members. In the end, he was again found guilty and resentenced to a life term with 29 years of preventative detention. As a result of his latest conviction, he will not be eligible for release until January 2028.

== See also ==
- List of French serial killers
- List of serial rapists

== TV documentaries ==
- « The Denis Waxin Affair » in 2002 in Autopsy of a Murder on 13th Street.
- « Denis Waxin, The Predator » on April 21, 2009, and March 27, 2011, in Get the Accused presented by Christophe Hondelatte on France 2.

== Radio shows ==
- « Denis Waxin, serial killer » on May 11, 2012, in The Hour of Crime of Jacques Pradel on RTL.
