= Intimate Strangers (2004 film) =

- Theatrical release poster
- Directed by: Patrice Leconte
- Written by: Jerome Tonnerre; Patrice Leconte
- Produced by: Alain Sarde
- Starring: Sandrine Bonnaire; Fabrice Luchini; Michel Duchaussoy
- Cinematography: Eduardo Serra
- Edited by: Joëlle Hache
- Music by: Pascal Estève
- Production companies: Les Films Alain Sarde; Zoulou Films; France 3 Cinéma; Assise Production
- Distributed by: Mars Distribution (France); StudioCanal (International)
- Release date: July 30, 2004
- Running time: 103 minutes
- Country: France
- Language: French
- Budget: $5.8 million
- Box office: $10.5 million

Intimate Strangers (French: Confidences trop intimes) is a 2004 French film directed by Patrice Leconte. The moody, stylish noir tells the story of a troubled young woman who in error starts telling her problems not to a psychiatrist but to a lonely tax consultant in the office next door.

== Plot ==
William, a reserved and solitary tax consultant in Paris, is surprised when a distressed young woman comes into his office and starts telling him her marital problems. Her name is Anna and her appointment was in fact with Dr Monnier, a psychotherapist on the same floor. Before William can clear up the misunderstanding, she says she will come again next week and leaves. The next time, she gives even more intimate details and William again fails to make clear that he can only handle her tax problems.

When she does not reappear in the following weeks, William worries if she is alright and consults Dr Monnier. The shrink guesses where his interest lies and does not interfere. William also confides in his former partner Jeanne who, as a woman, quickly guesses what Anna is up to. Anna does come back to William's office and a strange relationship develops, where she tells tales of her life and sexual activities while he listens sympathetically. Her husband appears and threatens William, who is not deterred.

Eventually Anna, who has been getting less neurotic and taking more care of her appearance, tells William she is leaving her husband and moving away. He wishes her well. A few months later, he moves his business to the south coast, where he has discovered she is working as a ballet teacher. Anna arrives at William's office and lays on the bed in the office, and William starts telling Anna his problems .....

== Cast ==
- Sandrine Bonnaire as Anna
- Fabrice Luchini as William
- Michel Duchaussoy as Dr. Monnier
- Anne Brochet as Jeanne
- Gilbert Melki as Marc
- Urbain Cancelier as Chatel
- Laurent Gamelon as Luc
- Hélène Surgère as Mrs. Mulon

== Release ==
The film was shown in competition at the 2004 Berlin Film Festival.

USA release

Paramount Classics acquired the United States distribution rights of this film and gave it a limited U.S. theatrical release on July 30, 2004; this film went on grossing $2.1 million in the United States theaters, which is considered a good result for a foreign language film. Ruth Vitale (who was the president of Paramount Classics at that time) was pleased with this film's performance in the United States market. Paramount Pictures (the parent studio of Paramount Vantage/Classics) was developing a comedic Hollywood remake of the film, with Hilary Swank attached to star and Kelly Fremon Craig writing the script.

== Reception ==
On Rotten Tomatoes, the film has an approval rating of 86% based on reviews from 104 critics. The site's consensus states "Intimate Strangers is Hitchcockian noir with a Gallic twist: Rather than simply imitating the genre's form, director/screenwriter Patrice Leconte delves into the underlying psychological drama." On Metacritic the film has a score of 71% based on reviews from 28 critics.

Roger Ebert of the Chicago Sun-Times gave it 3.5 out of 4 stars, and wrote: "We find we cannot take anything for face value in this story, that the motives of this woman and her husband are so deeply masked that even at the end of the film we are still uncertain about exactly what to believe, and why."
