= Alain Delon =

French actor (1935–2024)

Alain Delon CLH
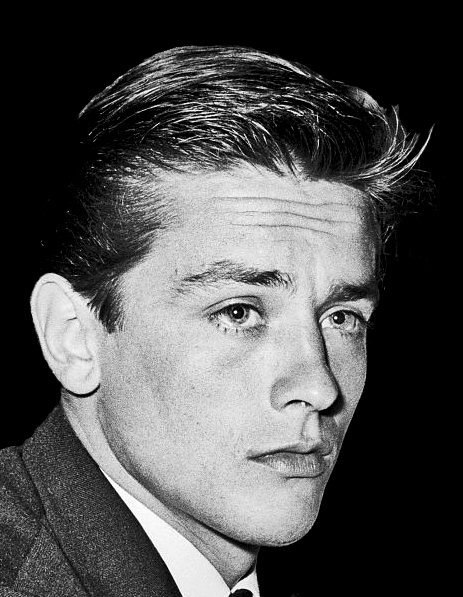
- Delon in 1961
- Born: Alain Fabien Maurice Marcel Delon; 8 November 1935; Sceaux, France
- Died: 18 August 2024 (aged 88); Douchy-Montcorbon, France
- Citizenship: France; Switzerland
- Occupations: Actor; film producer; screenwriter; singer; businessman
- Years active: 1949–2019
- Works: Full list
- Spouse: Nathalie Delon (m. 1964; div. 1969)
- Partners: Romy Schneider (1958–1964); Mireille Darc (1968–1983); Rosalie van Breemen (1987–2001)
- Children: At least 4, including Anthony, Anouchka, Alain-Fabien, and Christian Aaron Boulogne
- Awards: Full list

Military service
- Allegiance: France
- Branch/service: French Navy Fusiliers
- Years of service: 1952–1956
- Battles/wars: First Indochina War

Alain Fabien Maurice Marcel Delon (French: [alɛ̃ dəlɔ̃]; 8 November 1935 – 18 August 2024) was a French actor, film producer, screenwriter, singer, and businessman. Acknowledged as a cultural and cinematic leading man of the 20th century, Delon emerged as one of the foremost European actors of the late 1950s to the late 1980s, and became an international sex symbol. He is regarded as one of the most well-known figures in French cinema. His style, looks, and roles, which made him an international icon, earned him enduring popularity.

Delon achieved critical acclaim for his roles in films such as Women Are Weak (1959), Purple Noon (1960), Rocco and His Brothers (1960), L'Eclisse (1962), The Leopard (1963), Any Number Can Win (1963), The Black Tulip (1964), The Last Adventure (1967), Le Samouraï (1967), The Girl on a Motorcycle (1968), La Piscine (1969), Le Cercle Rouge (1970), Un flic (1972), and Monsieur Klein (1976). Over the course of his career, Delon worked with many directors, including Luchino Visconti, Jean-Luc Godard, Jean-Pierre Melville, Michelangelo Antonioni, Louis Malle, and Joseph Losey.

Delon received many film and entertainment awards throughout his career. In 1985, he won the César Award for Best Actor for his performance in Notre histoire (1984). In 1991, he became a member of France's Legion of Honour. At the 45th Berlin International Film Festival, he won the Honorary Golden Bear. At the 2019 Cannes Film Festival, he received the Honorary Palme d'Or.

In addition to his acting career, Delon also recorded the spoken part in the popular 1973 song "Paroles, paroles", a duet with Dalida as the main singing voice. He acquired Swiss citizenship in 1999.

== Family ==
The Delons are originally from Saint-Vincent-Lespinasse, in Tarn-et-Garonne. Their known genealogy goes back to Jean Delon, born in the fifteenth century. Delon's paternal great-grandfather, Fabien Delon (Saint-Vincent-Lespinasse, 28 December 1829 - Figeac (Lot), 12 December 1909), a civil engineer, was decorated with the Legion of Honour in 1892. His paternal grandmother, Maria Antonietta Evangelista (born in 1867 in Cassino), was Italian. On 3 December 1888 she married Delon's paternal grandfather, Jean-Marcel Delon (Figeac, 4 November 1856 – L'Haÿ-les-Roses 1926), then a tax collector in Gap, who was appointed in Corsica in 1886. The couple had two children together, a son François Fabien Delon and a daughter Jeanne Lucidora Adele Delon.

Delon's maternal grandfather, Alfred Louis Arnold (1876–1959), was born in Paris and was a rider of the French army, gendarme. His parents were Just Arnold, born in 1847 in Bürglen, Uri, a shoemaker by trade, and Marie-Adéle Lienemann, born in 1849, a cook. He married Maria Minard (1881–1913), a model for Jeanne Lanvin. The couple had two children: a daughter, Édith Marie Suzanne Arnold, and a son, Henri Arnold.

== Early life ==
=== Childhood and education: 1935–1952 ===
Alain Fabien Maurice Marcel Delon was born at 99 Rue Houdan on 8 November 1935 in Sceaux, a wealthy suburb of Paris in the department of Seine (now Hauts-de-Seine). His father François Fabien Delon (Craponne-sur-Arzon, 12 March 1904 – Le Kremlin-Bicêtre, 17 September 1977), was a projectionist and later the director of the cinema Le Régina in Bourg-la-Reine. His mother Édith Marie Suzanne Arnold (19 April 1911 – Jouy-en-Josas, 20 June 1995), was an assistant employed in a pharmacy and a theater usher at the cinema where both his parents met. Alain was born into a petit-bourgeois family.

Delon's parents divorced in 1939. Both of his parents remarried, and as a result he had two half brothers and an adopted sister on his father's side, and two half siblings on his mother's side. In these reconstructed families, Delon felt like a stranger and developed a sentiment of rejection. He was then entrusted to a foster family called Nérot, who lived on Rue de la Terasse. The father of the family was a prison guard in Fresnes Prison, Val-de-Marne. Delon, who lived next door, heard the salvo that executed the wartime collaborator Pierre Laval in the prison courtyard in 1945, the details of which he was told. While living with the foster family, Delon became passionate about bicycle racing and hoped to become a bicycle racer like Fausto Coppi.

When his foster parents died in 1946, Delon was sent back to his birth parents, who took shared custody of him. Growing up, he spent time living with his father and his second family in L'Haÿ-les-Roses and with his mother and her second family in Bourg-la-Reine. However his parents, not wanting to take care of him, decided to place him in the Catholic boarding school of Saint-Nicolas d'Igny (Essonne), where he spent his entire youth with one of his best friends, Gérard Salomé. There he developed his passion for music; he joined the school choir and was chosen to sing as a soloist. He was congratulated on a performance by the Apostolic Nuncio to France, Cardinal Angelo Roncalli, the later Pope John XXIII.

Due to the lack of attention from his parents, Delon became unruly, constantly misbehaving in the classroom and getting into fights with other children. He was expelled from the school after he beat up one of his classmates. The priests recommended he be sent to Saint Gabriel de Bagneaux. During his four years there, Delon constantly misbehaved and was disrespectful to his teachers. He then stole the director's motorcycle which resulted in him being expelled once more. Delon was expelled from a few more schools which were Jesuit, Benedictine, Franciscan and lay schools, until the age of 13, when he entered Saint Nicolas d'Igny Institute. There he had the opportunity to perform the role of a thug in Le Rapt, a 22-second silent short film directed by Olivier Bourguignon, a friend of his father. At age 14, Delon decided he did not want to stay in the school and wished to leave France. He decided to run away to Chicago with his friend Daniel Salwadet who had an uncle living there. They left the school, determined to hitchhike to Bordeaux. When they arrived in Châtellerault, a passerby took them to the local police station. Due to Delon's temper, he and his friend were put in jail and were sent back to their families. Because of his actions, Delon was expelled from the school. His parents then decided that studies were not for him and made Delon abandon them.

His mother took him into her home and decided to make him join the business of her husband, Paul Boulogne, a butcher and delicatessen owner from Bourg-la-Reine. He later said he never really found a place in that family and never felt safe there. Delon took courses at the Au Jambon de Paris, while working part time as his stepfather's delicatessen where he would go the central markets in the morning to buy 40 kilograms of sausages. He eventually obtained a Certificate of Professional Aptitude (Certificat d'Aptitude Professionnelle or CAP) in charcuterie. For three years he worked at his stepfather's delicatessen, which had sixteen employees; he also worked at other delicatessens as well. His family had plans for him to take over the delicatessen in the future. However, during those three years, Delon developed a very bad reputation in the community. He partied constantly, got into bar fights, and was at one point a member of a gang.

=== Military service and Indochina War: 1952–1956 ===
Anticipating the call up for military service, he joined the French Navy at age 17. After a stint at the Pont-Réan Maritime Training Centre, he continued his service in 1953 at the Bormette Signals School. After he was caught stealing equipment, the Navy gave him a choice of leaving it or extending his commitment from three to five years.

As a first-class seaman, he was then assigned to the protection company of the Saigon arsenal, in what was still French Indochina. Towards the end of the Indochina War, he was arrested for stealing a jeep and going on a trip during which the vehicle fell into a stream. His radio licence was revoked and he was given a dishonorable discharge from the Navy. He celebrated his 20th birthday in a prison cell. This period made a deep impression on him: he discovered military discipline, a sense of honour and respect for the values represented by the flag of France. He developed a passion for weapons and was captivated by the performance of French actor Jean Gabin in Touchez pas au grisbi, a film he saw in the Indochinese capital.

After his naval service, Delon returned to France in 1956. He resented his parents for letting him go to Indochina (he was a volunteer but their permission was necessary) and did not get back in touch with them, deciding to fend for himself and having no idea what he would do for a living. His younger brother Jean-François Delon reconnected with him in 1961 after he and his father saw Alain's name on a Rocco and His Brothers poster. Delon settled in at the Regina Hotel and did a few odd jobs, including produce handler at the Paris market Les Halles and waiter in a café near the Champs-Élysées. He met the future singer Dalida, with whom he would have an affair later in life. In Pigalle and Montmartre, he met members of the French underworld, thugs and gigolos, one of whom, a homosexual named Carlos, ensured his protection. Delon was fascinated by the values of this environment, in particular the sense of honour, friendship, respect and the law of silence. He allowed himself to be housed and fed by several prostitutes. His future at that point seemed to be heading towards a career as a pimp.

== Acting career ==
=== Early career: 1957–1958 ===
Delon discovered the bustling Saint-Germain-des-Prés district and at the Club Saint-Germain met the actress Brigitte Auber, who had recently acted for the director Alfred Hitchcock in To Catch a Thief. They lived together on rue du Pré-aux-Clercs, in the 7th arrondissement of Paris, which distanced Alain Delon from the underworld and changed his career path. On the occasion of the 1957 Cannes Film Festival, he went down with her to the Côte d'Azur and moved into the house she owned in Saint-Paul-de-Vence. It was during this festival that he became friends with Jean-Claude Brialy and came into contact with the film industry, where he met his future agent George Beaume. He was "spotted" by Henry Willson, who was in charge of recruiting new talent on behalf of the American film producer David O. Selznick, who offered him a trial run in Rome. He thus entered the world of cinema without any particular training as an actor.

In Rome, he lived with Gian Paolo Barbieri, who would become a famous photographer. In the Cinecittà studios, on the sidelines of the filming of Charles Vidor's A Farewell to Arms, he underwent conclusive auditions and Selznick offered him a seven-year contract in the United States on the condition that he learn English. Delon returned to Paris and began to study English, but the actress Michèle Cordoue, whose lover he had become, convinced her husband, the director Yves Allégret, to hire him to shoot his first film, Quand la femme s'en mêle. Delon initially rejected the offer from Allégret but eventually accepted, and Selznick allowed him to cancel the contract. He played a small role alongside the star Edwige Feuillère. Delon recounted: "I didn't know how to do anything. Allégret looked at me like that and he said: 'Listen to me, Alain. Speak as you speak to me. Look at how you look at me. Listen as you listen to me. Don't play, live.' It changed everything. If Yves Allégret hadn't told me that, I wouldn't have had this career."

He then appeared in the comedy Be Beautiful But Shut Up by Marc Allégret (Yves' brother), alongside Mylène Demongeot and Henri Vidal, as well as another fledgling actor, Jean-Paul Belmondo. During the shooting, he borrowed the Renault 4CV belonging to Pascal Jardin, the director's second assistant, against Jardin's advice. In the Saint-Cloud tunnel, the borrowed car rolled over five times. The vehicle was destroyed and Delon escaped, suffering only a minor injury that left a scar under his chin which became characteristic of his image.

In 1958, he became a leading man when he was chosen by the German actress Romy Schneider, who had become a world celebrity following the success of the Sissi film trilogy, to play her male partner in Christine by Pierre Gaspard-Huit. The producers arranged an interview with the press at Orly airport in Paris on 10 April 1958: the two young actors met for the first time when Romy got off the plane. Their relationship was initially stormy; Schneider didn't speak French, Delon didn't speak German, and while she found him uninteresting and in bad taste, he found her unattractive. Filming began two months later and the two actors did not get along at all. However, they ended up falling in love and the "fiancés of Europe" celebrated their official engagement, organized by Romy's mother and stepfather in Morcote, Switzerland, on the shores of Lake Lugano, in front of the international press, without planning a date for a possible wedding. They embodied beauty, youth, success and became a couple celebrated by showbusiness and the public.

After Christine, where he played his first important role, Delon had his first success in Michel Boisrond's Weak Women, where he reunited with Mylène Demongeot and also shared the bill with other young leads, Pascale Petit and Jacqueline Sassard. In Le Chemin des écoliers, based on Marcel Aymé, he played the son of the character played by Bourvil. His model was Jean Gabin.

=== French stardom and international fame: 1959–1964 ===
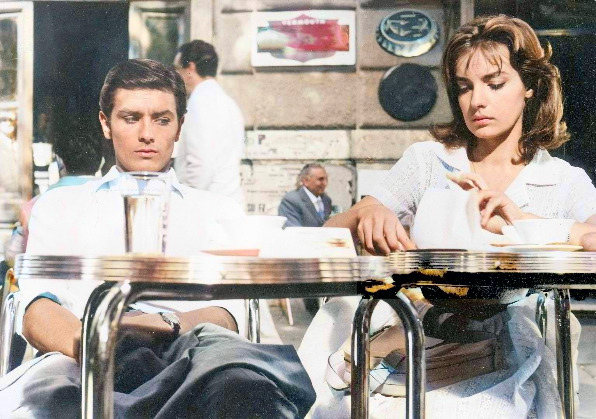
Delon and Marie Laforêt during the shooting of Purple Noon in Italy, August 1959 (speculatively colorized)

Delon was given the lead in the comedy Women Are Weak (1959). This was a big hit in France and was the first of Delon's films to be seen in America.

In a 1959 interview first aired on the French television program Cinépanorama, conducted during the filming of Rocco and His Brothers, Alain Delon expressed his admiration for Jean Marais, stating that he idolized the actor. "Everything is happening very quickly for you, you must be caught in a whirlwind, do you manage to find yourself?" He answered: "I try to not let myself be overwhelmed. To remain what I was before, to remain as simple. I took as a model an actor that I love and that is Jean Marais, who always remained the same."

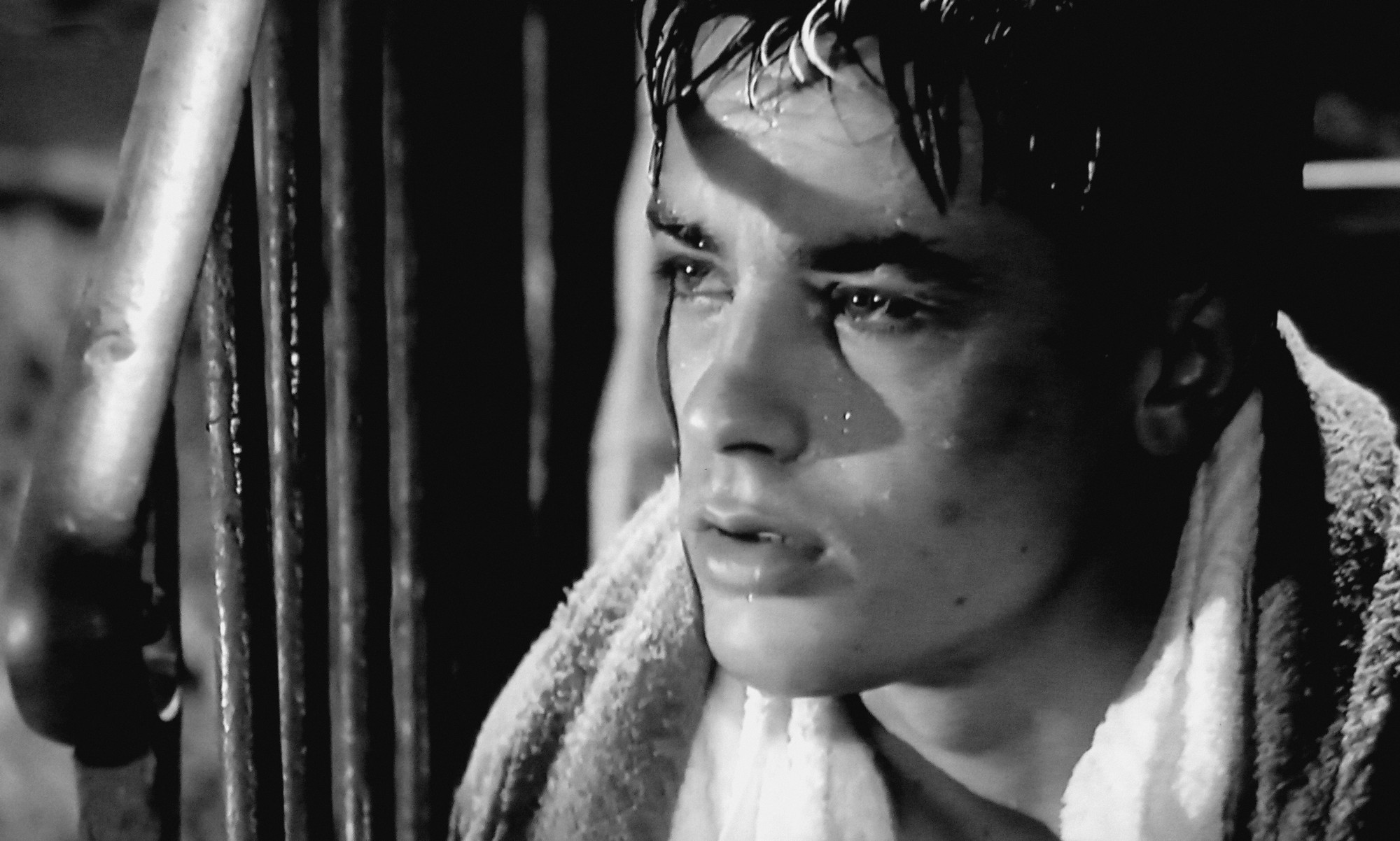
Delon in Rocco and His Brothers (1960)

Delon next made two films that ensured his international reputation. In 1960, he appeared in René Clément's Plein Soleil, released in the US as Purple Noon, which was based on the Patricia Highsmith novel The Talented Mr. Ripley. Delon played protagonist Tom Ripley to critical acclaim; Highsmith was a fan of his portrayal. The movie was a hit in France and on the art house circuit in English-speaking countries. He then played the title role in Luchino Visconti's Rocco and His Brothers (1960). Critic Bosley Crowther of The New York Times wrote that Delon's work was "touchingly pliant and expressive".

Delon made his stage debut in 1961 in the John Ford play 'Tis Pity She's a Whore alongside Romy Schneider in Paris. Visconti directed the production which broke box office records. He was reunited with René Clément in the Italian comedy film about fascism, The Joy of Living (1961). It was a minor success. More popular was an all-star anthology film Famous Love Affairs (1961); Delon's segment cast him as Albert III, Duke of Bavaria, opposite Brigitte Bardot. Around this time Delon was mentioned as a possibility for the lead in Lawrence of Arabia.

Peter O'Toole was cast instead, but then Delon was signed by Seven Arts to a four-picture deal, including a big budget international movie of the Marco Polo story and The King of Paris, about Alexandre Dumas. Neither project came to fruition. Instead he was cast by Michelangelo Antonioni opposite Monica Vitti in L'Eclisse (1962), a major critical success, although audiences were small. More popular was another all-star anthology film, The Devil and the Ten Commandments (1963); Delon's segment cast him with Danielle Darrieux.

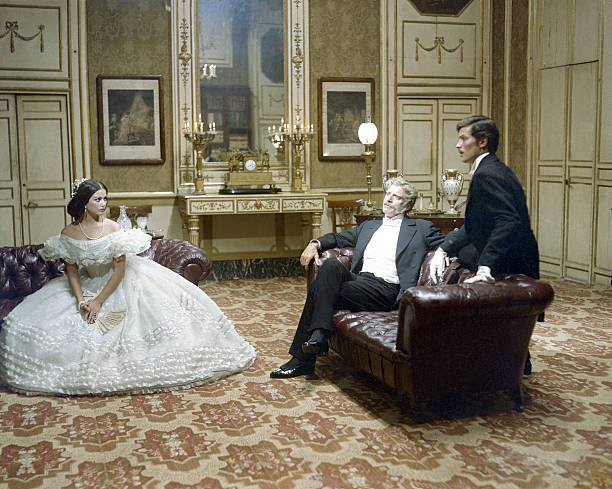
Claudia Cardinale, Burt Lancaster and Alain Delon in Il Gattopardo (The Leopard) (1963)

Producer Jacques Bar was making a heist film starring Jean Gabin with backing from MGM, titled Any Number Can Win (1963). Gabin's co-star was going to be Jean-Louis Trintignant until Delon lobbied Bar for the role. He took the film's distribution rights in certain countries instead of a straight salary. Because such an arrangement had never previously been made in France, it became known as "Delon's method". Delon's gamble paid off handsomely, with Jean Gabin later claiming that Delon earned 10 times more money than he did as a result. However, in 1965, Delon claimed "no one else has tried it since and made money".

The experience gave Delon a taste for producing. He signed a five-picture deal with MGM, of which Any Number Can Win was the first. His reputation was further enhanced when he worked with Visconti again in Il Gattopardo (The Leopard) with Burt Lancaster and Claudia Cardinale. It was the seventh biggest hit of the year in France. Any Number Can Win was the sixth. The Leopard was widely screened in the U.S. through 20th Century Fox. Delon was now one of the most popular stars in France. He starred in a swashbuckler, The Black Tulip (1964), another hit.

Les Félins (1964), which reunited him with Clement and co-starred Jane Fonda, was filmed in French and English versions. The latter was distributed by MGM, but it was not a success. In 1964, the Cinémathèque Française held a showcase of Delon's films and Delon started a production company, Delbeau Production, with Georges Beaume. They produced a film called The Unvanquished (L'insoumis) in 1964, in which Delon played a terrorist OAS assassin. It had to be re-edited because of legal issues. Despite being distributed by MGM, audiences were small. After finishing the film, Delon left the French cinema to pursue a career in Hollywood.

=== Hollywood star: 1964–1966 ===
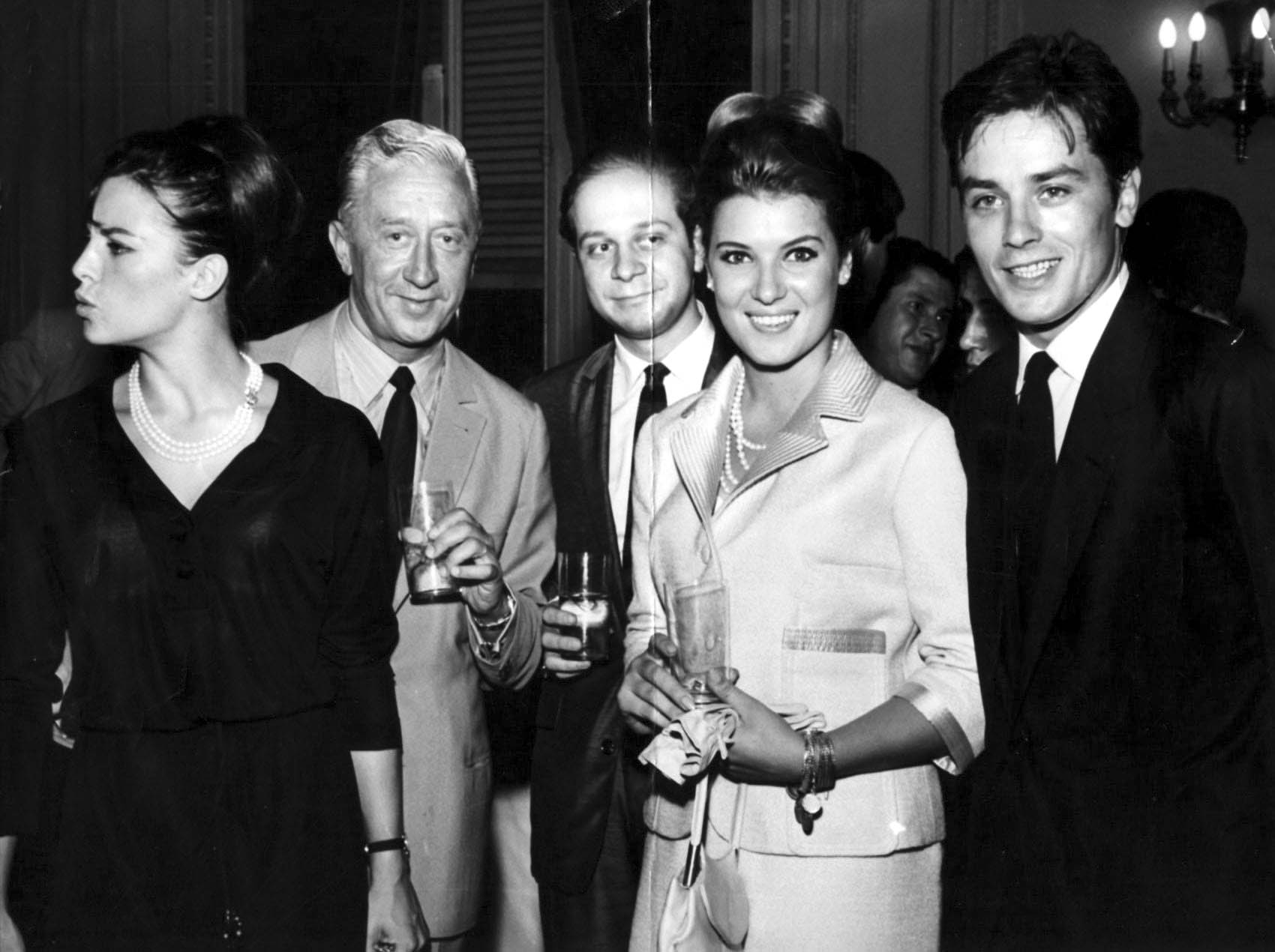
Delon with his wife Nathalie (left) in Buenos Aires in 1965.

Typecast as a "Latin lover", Delon spent the next few years focused on Hollywood. In 1965 he said that he wanted to make a picture in America and one in Europe each year. He also said that his accent prevented him from playing certain roles: "Because of my accent, I would not attempt to play Americans. I am working on removing the distinctly French inflections from my speech so that I can play all continental nationalities."

He made his debut in the British film industry starring in an all-star anthology for MGM titled The Yellow Rolls-Royce (1964), opposite Shirley MacLaine. It was popular but Delon did not have a big role in the film. He made his Hollywood debut as the lead role in the film Once a Thief (1965), where he co-starred with Ann-Margret. It was based on a novel by Zekial Marko who had written Any Number Can Win, but it was not as successful. It was financed by MGM, which announced Delon would appear in a Western to be titled Ready for the Tiger and directed by Sam Peckinpah, but the film was never made.

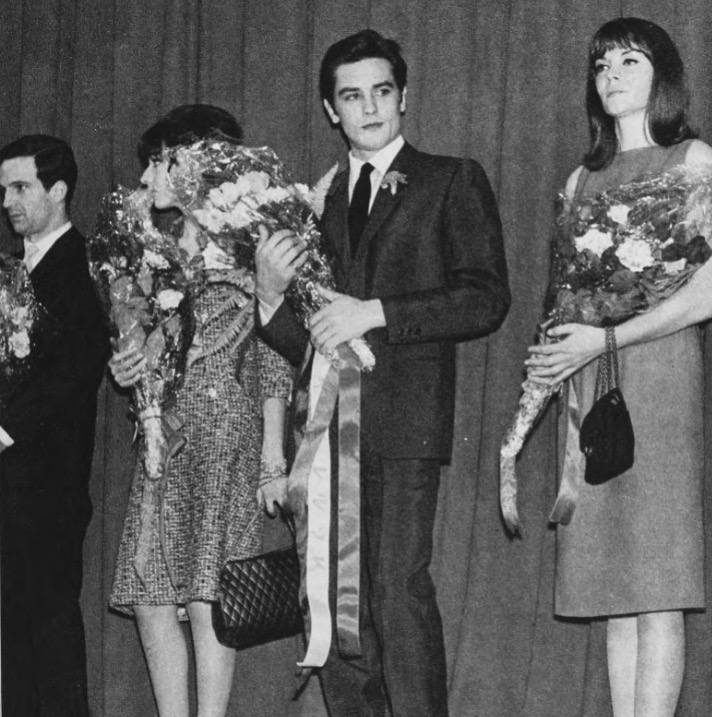
François Truffaut, Marie Laforêt, Delon, and Françoise Brion at the 3rd French Film Festival in Tokyo (1963).

Instead, Delon signed a three-picture deal with Columbia, for whom he appeared in the big budget action film Lost Command (1966), playing a member of the French Foreign Legion, alongside Anthony Quinn and Claudia Cardinale. The movie performed modestly in the box office but it was not a huge success. The studio announced that he would appear in the biopic Cervantes, but this was never made. Universal Studios used Delon in a Western, Texas Across the River (1966), opposite Dean Martin. Ray Stark wanted to use him in The Night of the Iguana and This Property Is Condemned. He did not appear in either film but acted in that producer's Is Paris Burning? (1966), directed by René Clément, playing Jacques Chaban-Delmas. This was a massive hit in France but performed disappointingly at the US box office – as did all of Delon's Hollywood-financed films. Delon remained a massive star in France, along with Steve McQueen and Sean Connery, and was one of the biggest foreign stars in Japan. However, he could not make headway in the US market.

=== Return to France: 1967–1971 ===
After one British movie and four Hollywood movies Delon returned to France to rejoin the French cinema. He starred in the film The Last Adventure opposite Lino Ventura. It was one of Delon's most popular films of the 1960s but was not popular in North America. He was meant to work again with Visconti in The Stranger but this did not happen. Instead, he appeared on the Paris stage in Les Yeux Crevés and starred in the neo-noir crime thriller Le Samouraï ('The Samurai') with Nathalie Delon, directed by Jean-Pierre Melville, which became another film classic. He played an amnesiac in Diabolically Yours (1968) for Julien Duvivier.

He had a role in another all-star anthology Spirits of the Dead (1968). His segment was directed by Louis Malle, and co-starred Brigitte Bardot. Delon had another attempt at English-language cinema with The Girl on a Motorcycle (1968) with Marianne Faithfull, for director Jack Cardiff. It was a surprise hit in Britain and was the sixth most popular movie in the box office; however it did not do well in France. The Girl on a Motorcycle, which was released in United States as Naked Under Leather, would be the first film to receive an X rating in the United States. Far more popular at the French box office was Farewell Friend (Adieu l'ami), in which Delon and Charles Bronson played former foreign legionnaires who get involved in a heist. The film helped turn Charles Bronson into a genuine star in Europe.

The 1969 thriller film La Piscine (The Swimming Pool) reunited the 1960s couple mythique ('mythical couple') Alain Delon and Romy Schneider. This was thought to be one of the reasons for its success. Schneider had dramatically broken up with Delon, who married Nathalie Delon, a couple of years earlier and married German director and actor Harry Meyen in Berlin, with whom she had a child. Delon asked the filmmaker to book her for this role. He continuously pursued her, both before and after filming La Piscine, with persistent attempts to reconcile. Despite Romy Schneider's refusals, their shared history and emotional connection spilled onto the screen, infusing the film with raw authenticity.

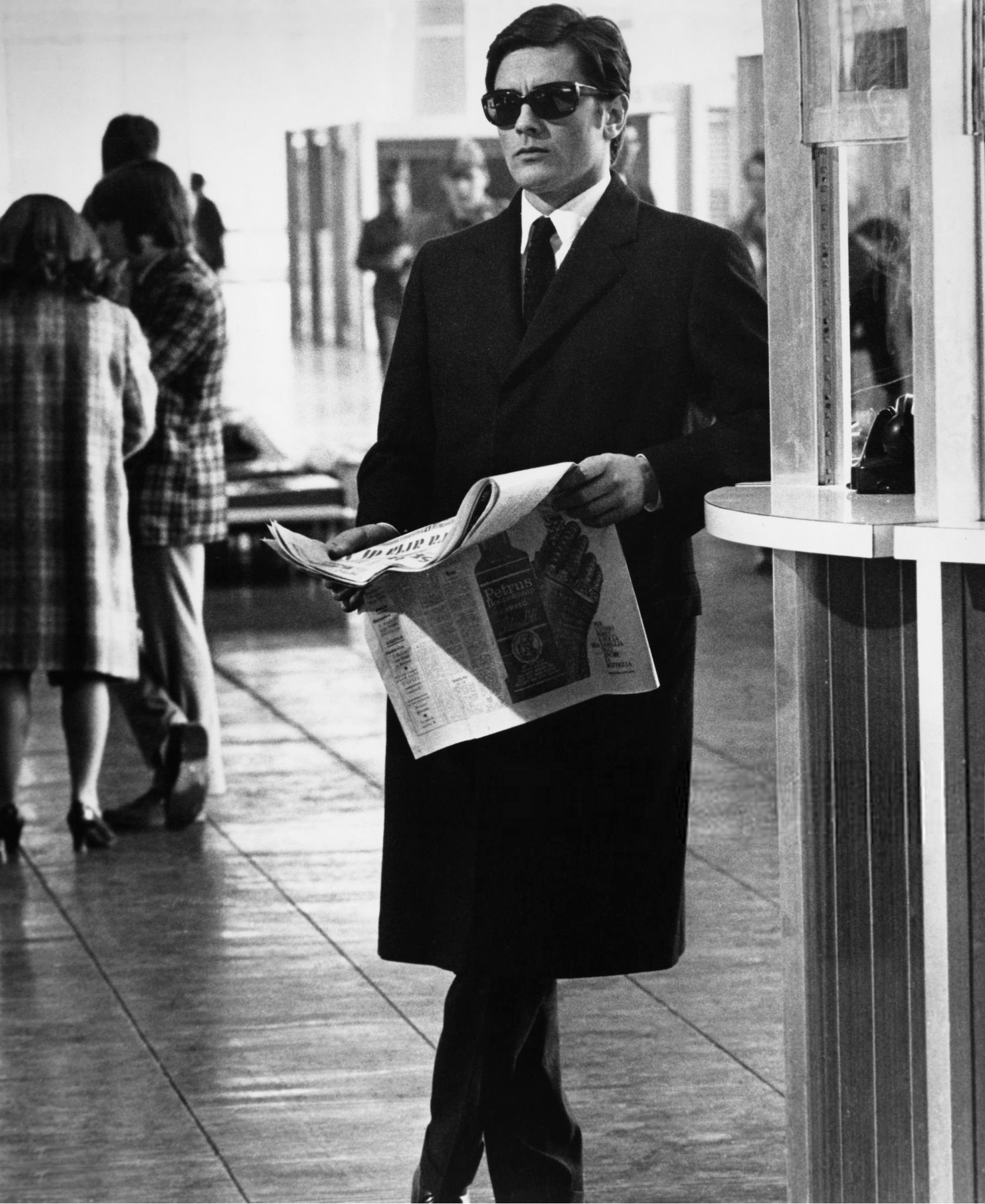
Delon in The Sicilian Clan (1969)

While Delon was making La Piscine, the body of his Yugoslav secretary and bodyguard Stefan Marković, apparently murdered, was found in a rubbish dump near Paris. The police investigation revealed rumors of unlawful parties involving celebrities such as Delon and members of the French government, including future president Georges Pompidou, whose wife Claude was allegedly the subject of a series of compromising photos at one such party. Corsican crime boss François Marcantoni, a friend of Delon, was suspected of involvement in the murder. The affair gained notoriety throughout France and in the French press as the "Marković affair".

Delon then starred in a series of gangster films. The first was Jeff (1969), made by his own production company, Adel. In The Sicilian Clan (1969) Delon collaborated with Lino Ventura and Jean Gabin, and the film was a blockbuster. Even more popular in Europe was Borsalino (1970), which Delon produced and in which he co-starred opposite Jean-Paul Belmondo. Neither of these films was successful in the US, as Delon had hoped. Neither was The Red Circle (1970), despite Delon co-starring in it with Yves Montand. For a change of pace, he produced a romantic drama, The Love Mates (1971), which was not successful. Neither was the 1971 comedy Easy, Down There!.

=== Established actor and more international films ===
==== 1970s ====
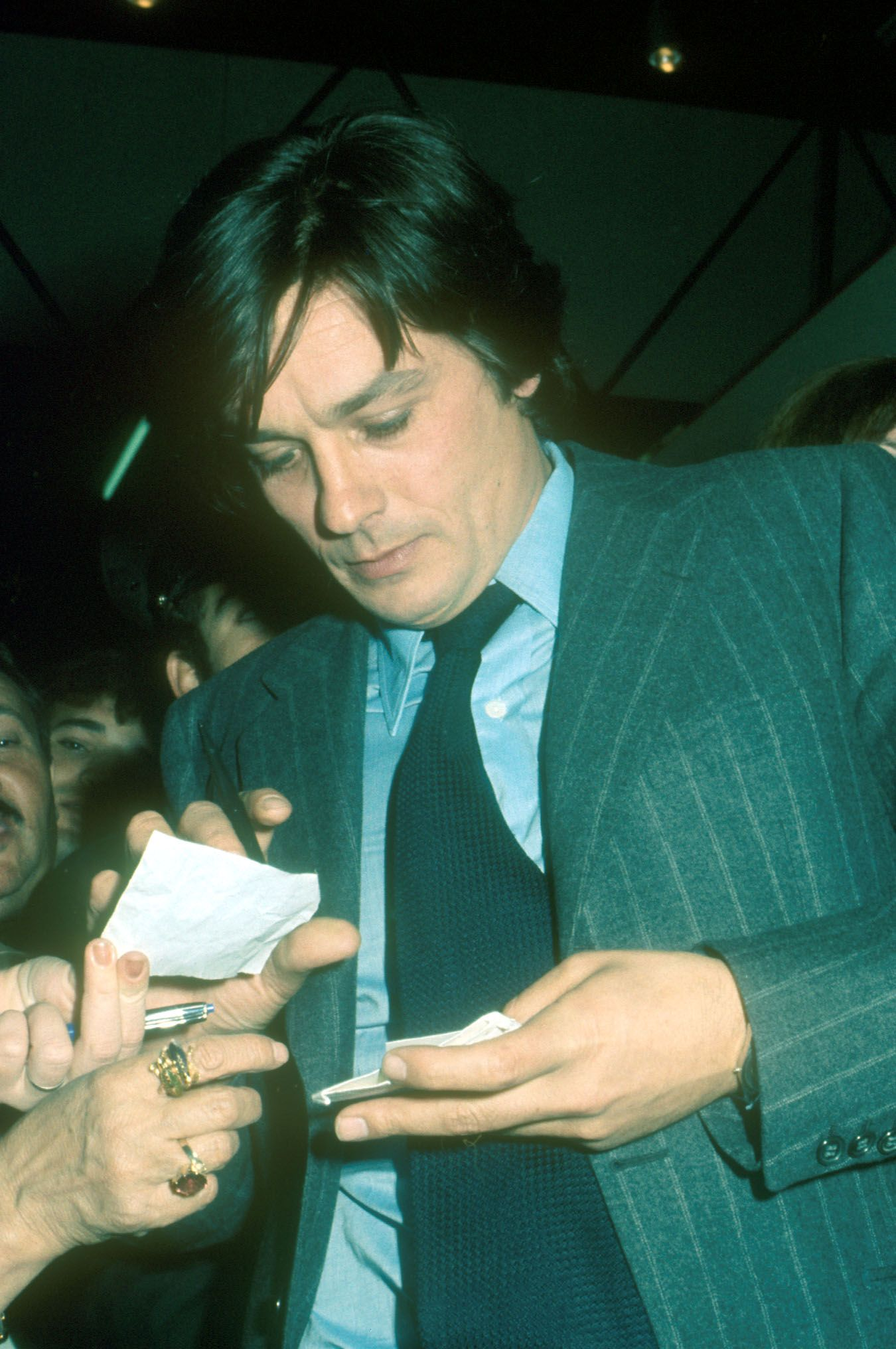
Delon signing autographs in 1971

In the early 1970s, Delon made another attempt at the English-speaking market. The Assassination of Trotsky (1972) for Joseph Losey was poorly received, but Red Sun (1972), with Charles Bronson and Toshiro Mifune, did well. In France he appeared opposite Simone Signoret in The Widow Couderc (1971). He starred in his third film with Melville, Un flic in 1972 as well. He then produced and starred in a romantic drama, Indian Summer (1972), and subsequently appeared in the thrillers, Traitement de choc (1973), and Tony Arzenta (1973).

In 1973, he recorded a duet with Dalida, "Paroles, paroles", that went on to become one of the most recognizable French songs. He tried again for Hollywood stardom with Scorpio (1973), with Burt Lancaster for director Michael Winner. It was only a minor hit. In France, he made The Burned Barns (1973) and Creezy (1974). He produced Two Men in Town (1974) which re-teamed him with Jean Gabin, and Borsalino & Co. (1974), a sequel to his earlier hit.

After another gangster thriller, Icy Breasts (1974), Delon returned to his first swashbuckler since The Black Tulip, playing the title character in the 1975 Italian-French film Zorro. He made some more crime filmes: The Gypsy (1975), Flic Story (1975) (with Jean Louis Triginant), Boomerang (1976) and Armaguedon (1976). In 1976, Delon starred in Monsieur Klein, for which he was nominated for the César Award.

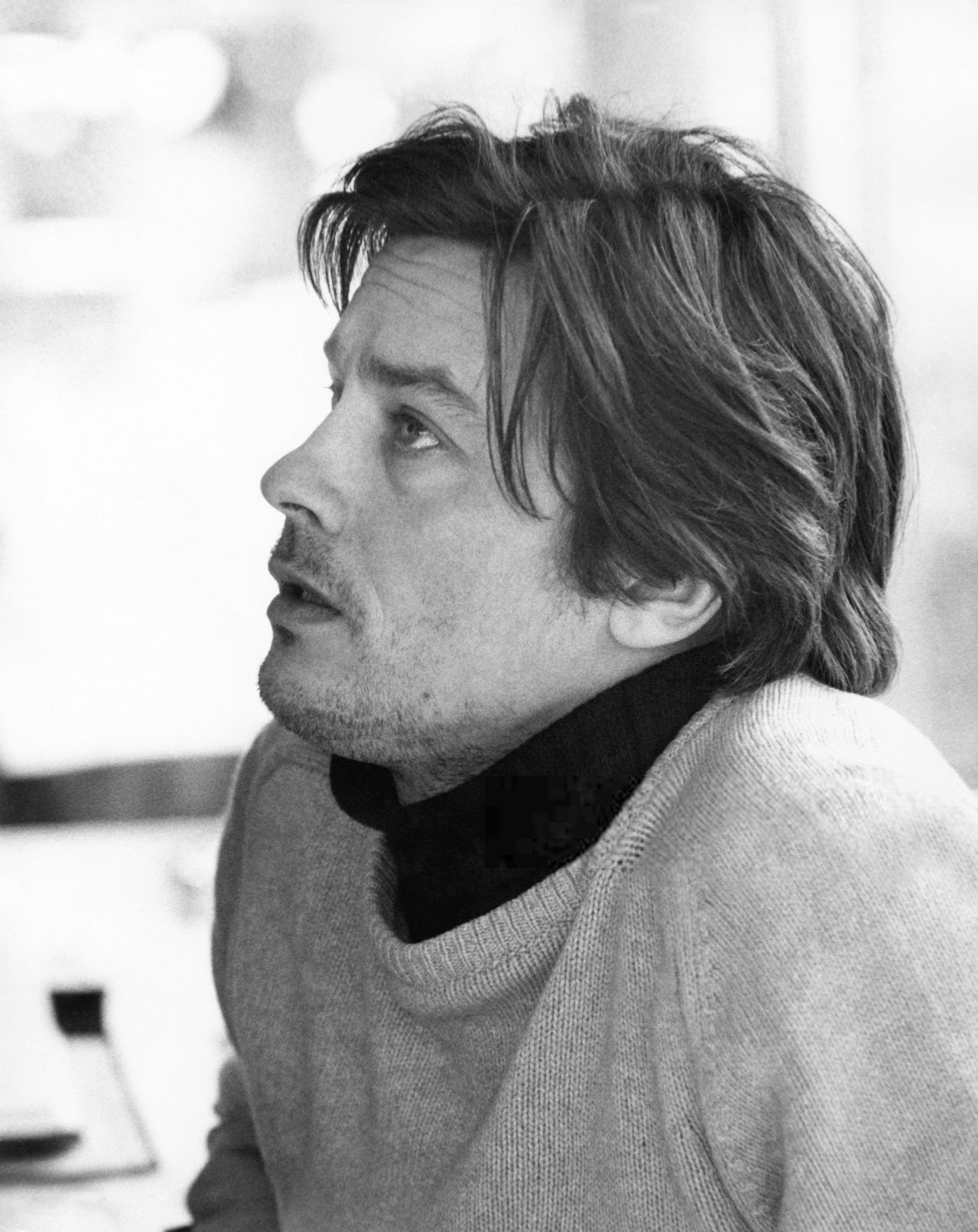
Delon in 1972

It was back to crime for another series of thrillers in which he starred as well as produced: Man in a Hurry (1977), Death of a Corrupt Man (1977), Le Gang (1977), and Attention, The Kids Are Watching (1978). In 1979, Delon stated that only a quarter of his business activities involved films, that he also had "a helicopter business, built furniture, promoted prize fights, and raced horses", and that he was still interested in becoming a star in America.

In 1979 he made a final attempt at Hollywood stardom, signing with agent Sue Mengers and starring in The Concorde... Airport '79 (1979). The film was not a big success. Delon returned to acting in French films, playing in and producing The Medic (1979) and Three Men to Kill (1980).

=== Later career ===
==== 1980s and 1990s ====
Teheran 43 (1981) was a change of pace. In this big Soviet production he co-starred with Claude Jade and Curd Jürgens (Curt Jurgens) in a co-starring role beside Russian actors. Then it was back to crime: For a Cop's Hide (1981), Le Choc (1982, opposite Catherine Deneuve), Le Battant (1983). He was awarded the Best Actor César Award for his role in Bertrand Blier's Notre histoire (1984), and portrayed the aristocratic dandy Baron de Charlus in a film adaptation of Marcel Proust's novel Swann in Love in the same year.

His thrillers resumed with Parole de flic (1986), The Passage, Let Sleeping Cops Lie (1988), and Dancing Machine (1990). One notable film during this period was Jean-Luc Godard's Nouvelle Vague in 1990, in which Delon played twins. Delon's last major role was in Patrice Leconte's Une chance sur deux in 1998, alongside Jean-Paul Belmondo, another box office disappointment. Delon announced his decision to give up acting in 1997, although he still occasionally accepted roles.

Delon acquired Swiss citizenship in 1999, and the company managing products sold under his name is based in Geneva. He resided in Chêne-Bougeries in the canton of Geneva.

=== Mature years and retirement ===
==== 2000s and 2010s ====
In 2001, Delon starred in the French television drama Fabio Montale. He played an ageing policeman dressed in stylish clothes, a "signature Delon" role for audiences. The show was a big hit. In 2003, Delon tried to recreate the success of Fabio Montale and produced and starred in another French television police drama, Frank Riva. It did well but less so than Fabio Montale.

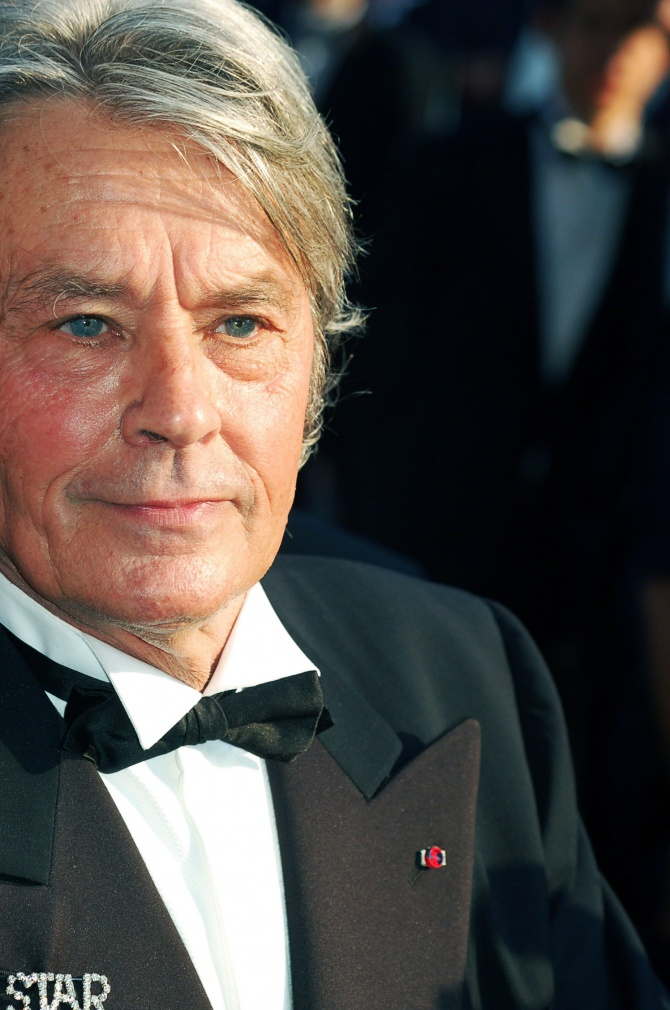
Delon at the 2007 Cannes Film Festival

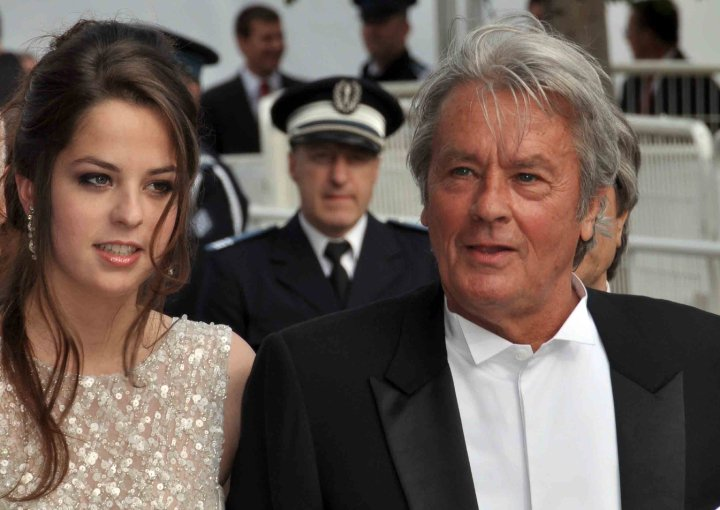
Delon with his daughter Anouchka at the 2010 Cannes Film Festival

He starred in 2008 as Julius Caesar in the box-office hit Asterix aux jeux Olympiques, which co-starred Gérard Depardieu. Around this time he mostly took roles in TV movies and also played some roles on the French stage.

He directed a TV movie in 2008, co-starring Anouk Aimée, titled Love Letters based on a play by A.R. Gurney. In 2018, after a seven-year hiatus from cinema, Delon had planned to star in a new movie, titled La Maison Vide, co-starring Juliette Binoche and directed by Patrice Leconte. However, in November 2018 the French media announced that the project had been canceled. No specific reason was given for the cancellation. Among his last roles were in the 2011 television movie Une journée ordinaire, and in the 2012 Russian production S Novym godom, Mamy! in which he starred as himself. He again appeared as himself in the 2019 movie Toute Resemblance as a guest on a talkshow.

In April 2019, at 83, Delon released a new single, "Je n'aime que toi", composed by Rick Allison and Julia Paris. In 1973, Delon had scored a huge international hit duetting with Egyptian-French singer Dalida on the song "Paroles, paroles". He also collaborated with Shirley Bassey in 1983 on the international hit song "Thought I'd Ring You".

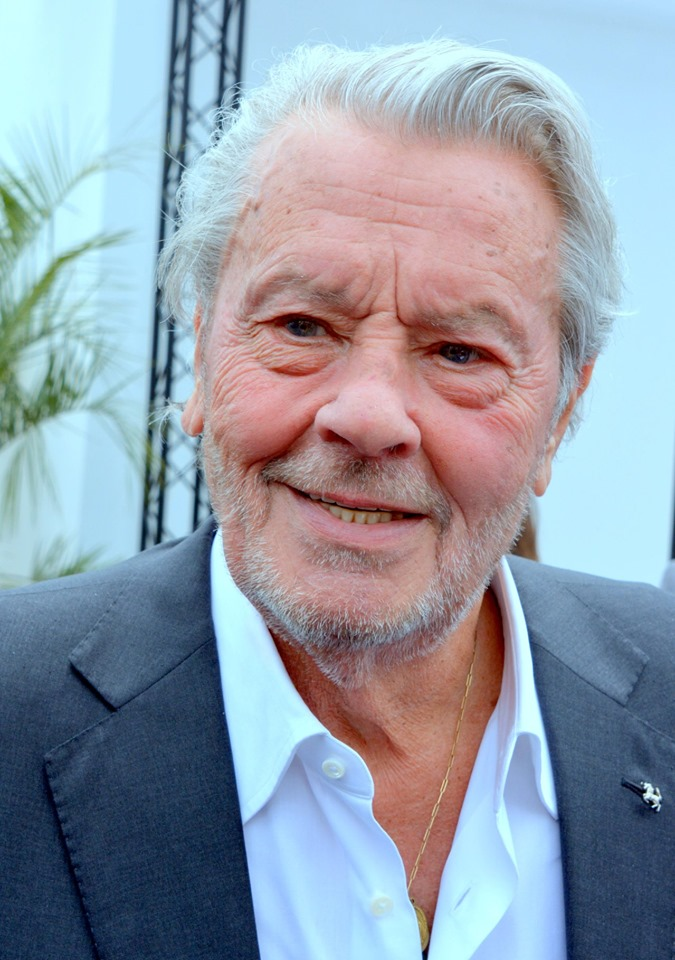
Delon at the 2019 Cannes Film Festival

At the 2019 Cannes Film Festival, Delon received an honorary Palme d'Or for his long-standing career in movies. A retrospective of some of his films was shown at the festival. However, there was much controversy surrounding Delon receiving this award due to remarks he had allegedly made about the treatment of women during his career and in his private life. Thierry Frémaux, the artistic director of the festival, addressed the controversy during a homage at the ceremony, stating, "We know that intolerance is back. We're being asked to believe that if we all think the same, it will protect us from the risk of being disliked or being wrong. But Alain Delon is not afraid of being wrong, being disliked, and he doesn't think like others, and he's not afraid of being alone." Delon responded emotionally, saying, "For me, it's more than the end of a career. It's the end of a life. It feels as though I'm receiving a posthumous tribute while being alive." He received the award from his daughter, Anouchka Delon.

==== 2020s ====
In a July 2021 interview on TV5Monde, his first since having two strokes, Delon said that he planned to act in one more film. Also on TV5Monde, Delon interviewed Ukrainian President Zelensky in September 2022 as part of a special programme on the war in Ukraine, Face à Zelensky. Delon expressed his support for the Ukrainian people during the interview.

== Business career ==
In the 1970s, Delon expanded his commercial interests, buying harness racing trotters and promoting boxing matches. He began working as a professional boxing promoter having been introduced by Nino Cerruti to world middleweight champion Carlos Monzón. The largest fight he promoted was Monzón's defense against José Napoles.

He helped develop and promote a variety of products sold under his name including wristwatches, clothing, eyewear, perfume, stationery, and cigarettes. Delon's brand of sunglasses became particularly popular in Hong Kong after actor Chow Yun-fat wore them in the 1986 crime film A Better Tomorrow, as well as two sequels. Delon reportedly wrote a letter thanking Chow for helping to promote and sell the sunglasses in Hong Kong and China. The film's director John Woo has acknowledged Delon as one of his idols and wrote a short essay on Le Samourai as well as Le Cercle Rouge for the Criterion Collection DVD releases. In 2009 and 2015, Christian Dior used images of the young Alain Delon and excerpts of his 1960s films The Swimming Pool and The Last Adventure respectively in the Eau Sauvage cologne advertising campaigns.

== Legal troubles ==
=== Marković affair ===
On 1 October 1968, the body of Stevan Stevica Marković, Delon's bodyguard, was found in a public dump in Élancourt, Yvelines, a village on the western outskirts of Paris. Delon and François Marcantoni, a Corsican gangster, came under investigation, partly because of a letter from Marković to his brother Aleksandar, in which he had written: "If I get killed, it's 100% the fault of Alain Delon and his godfather François Marcantoni." Following some articles in the press and testimony by Boriboj Akov, the investigation involved the former prime minister (and future president) of France, Georges Pompidou, who testified that he and his wife, Claude Jacqueline Pompidou, had been present at certain parties with Marković and Delon.

=== Hiromi Rollin case ===
On 5 July 2023, Delon's three children filed a complaint against his companion, Hiromi Rollin, alleging psychological harassment, interception of correspondence, animal cruelty, intentional violence, unlawful confinement, and abuse of weakness. According to Anthony Delon, his father requested in writing that Mrs. Rollin leave the residence in Douchy-Montcorbon. An investigation was opened on 6 July. On 7 July, Yassine Bouzrou, lawyer for Hiromi Rollin, stated that she disputed "the entirety of the facts". Bouzrou added that she would file a complaint against members of the Delon family and their bodyguards for aggravated voluntary violence suffered by Rollin on 5 July 2023. The prosecutor of Montargis dismissed the two complaints filed by the three Delon children against Rollin due to insufficiently characterized offenses, and Rollin's complaint was dismissed for the same reasons.

=== Family civil dispute ===
On 4 January 2024, Alain Delon filed a complaint against his son Anthony following an interview granted by the latter to Paris Match magazine. Anthony discussed his father's fragile health and accused his half-sister Anouchka of manipulating their father regarding the inheritance. In this interview, the eldest revealed that his father was "weakened" and that he "can't bear to see himself like this, diminished". Subsequently, Anthony Delon filed a police report against Anouchka, accusing her of not informing the family about the negative results of five cognitive tests conducted by their father between 2019 and 2022, after he suffered a severe stroke in 2019. Anouchka Delon, on the other hand, accused her brothers of endangering their father's life and claimed to have wanted to take their father to Switzerland so he could continue to be treated there. She then announced plans to sue for defamation, false accusations, threats, and harassment against Anthony Delon. Furthermore, Alain Delon's lawyer asserted that his client "cannot bear the aggressiveness of his son Anthony, who keeps telling him that he is senile". On 29 March 2024, Anouchka Delon sued her brothers for invasion of privacy after the broadcast of a recording in January 2024 on Instagram of a conversation between her and her father. Anthony and Alain-Fabien will thus be judged for "use, retention, or disclosure of a document or recording obtained by an invasion of another's privacy". The trial date is set for April 2025. Physically weakened by cancer, Delon was placed under reinforced guardianship by judicial decision in April 2024, following a hearing at the Montargis court, in the presence of the actor's three children. This measure follows a period during which Delon had already been placed under guardianship since 25 January, and notably granted the curator appointed by the judge the power to manage his expenses.

=== Other legal trouble ===
On 26 February 2024, police raided Delon's home where they seized 72 firearms and 3,000 rounds of ammunition. A court-appointed official had been sent to the home of Delon, who was not authorised to own a firearm, and alerted a judge after noticing a weapon in the residence.

== Personal life ==
=== Habits ===
Delon was known to frequently refer to himself in the third person.

=== Relationships and family ===
On 20 March 1959, Delon became engaged to actress Romy Schneider, whom he met when they co-starred in the film Christine (1958). After their first film together, the couple became iconic. Schneider, already a highly acclaimed star, and Delon, a rising talent, were affectionately nicknamed "les amants magnifiques" (the magnificent lovers), "les fiancés éternels" (eternal fiancés), and "les amants terribles" (the terrible lovers) due to their passionate and tumultuous relationship, which was the subject of intense media scrutiny, with paparazzi relentlessly pursuing them. Schneider's family remained opposed to their union, adding further complexities to their romance. In 1964, Delon and Schneider ended their relationship. Following the breakup, and during the early period of his marriage, Delon made attempts to resume his relationship with Schneider, efforts which continued over the following years. Their love story continued to captivate audiences and cemented their status as one of the most beautiful couples in cinema history. In 2009, Delon admitted his regret at not marrying Schneider, and in 2018 he referred to her as the love of his life.

On 11 August 1962 in Paris, German singer Nico gave birth to her son Ari Boulogne. She always maintained that Alain Delon was the child's father. Ari was raised by his paternal grandparents, Alain Delon's parents, and later on adopted. Delon never acknowledged his paternity and refused to submit to a DNA test, even though Ari was considered his son by his family. Nevertheless, Alain Delon admitted to having had a relationship with Nico once at the time of the conception.

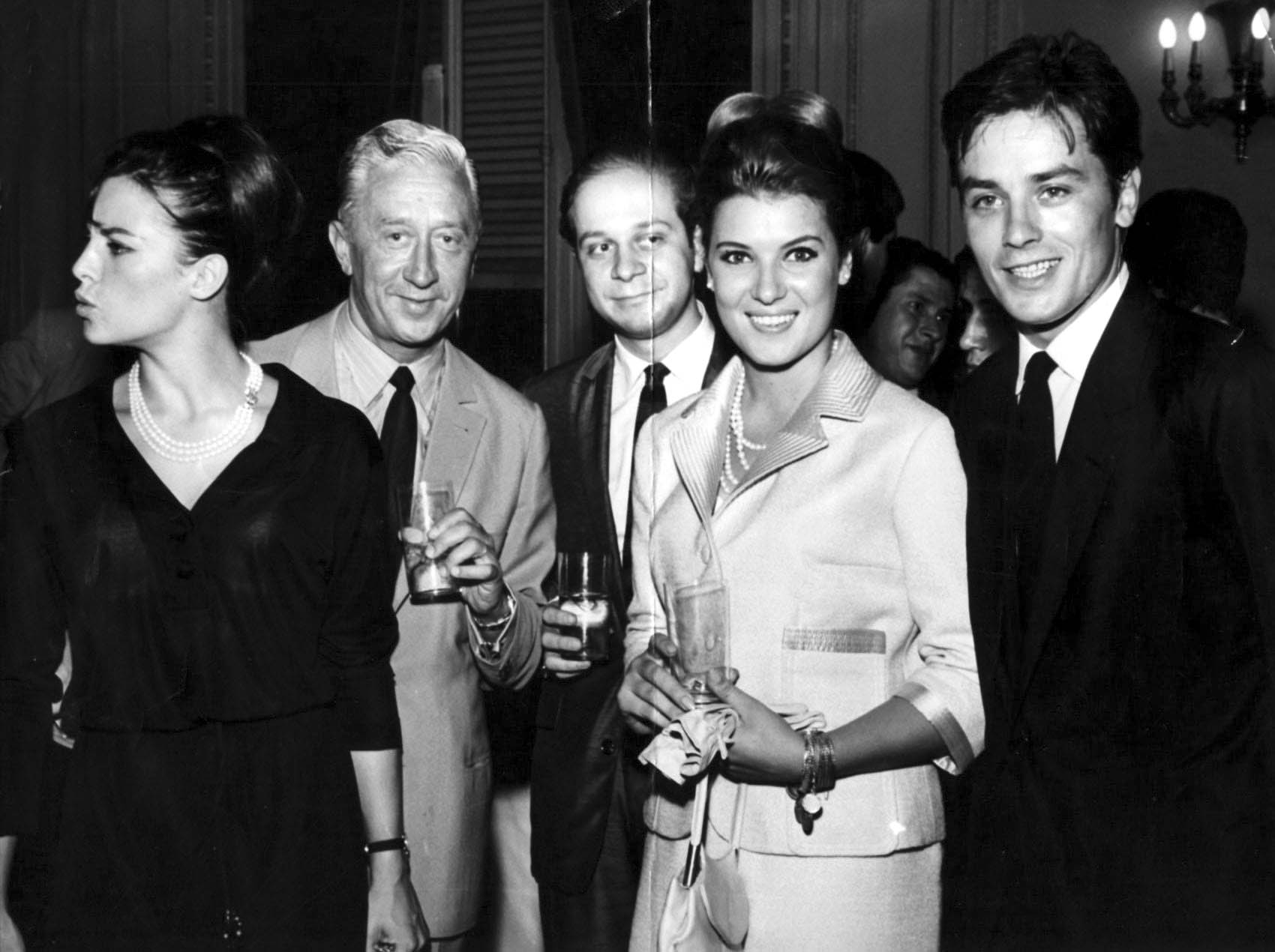
Alain and Nathalie Delon in Buenos Aires 1965.

In 1963, Delon met the young divorcée Francine Canovas (birth name), a model known professionally as Nathalie Barthélémy. He was also involved in an affair with Marisa Mell both before and after publicly announcing his engagement to Barthélemy during a press conference. This liaison continued even after his marriage in 1964 and persisted into 1965. On 13 August 1964, he married Barthélemy due to her pregnancy, and thereafter she took the name Nathalie Delon. Their son, Anthony Delon, her second child, was born on 30 September 1964. Nathalie later revealed that Delon's love for Romy Schneider remained a constant presence in their relationship, with Delon often displaying a deep sadness indicative that his heart still belonged to Schneider. In 1964–1965, Delon's relationships also included affairs with Ann-Margret and Lana Wood. In October 1964, Delon met Ratna Sari Dewi, at the Tokyo Olympics, and the two began a relationship. They remained close in the following years, including a meeting in Paris in 1967. In 1967, Delon filed for divorce. The couple divorced on 14 February 1969.

In August 1968, during the shooting of the film Jeff (1969), Delon met the French actress Mireille Darc and asked her to appear with him in a movie. They started a relationship that lasted until 1982. He later had short relationships with the actresses Anne Parillaud, as well as Catherine Bleynie, the ex-wife of Didier Pironi.

In 1987, Delon met the Dutch model Rosalie van Breemen on the set of the music video for his song "Comme au cinéma" and started a relationship. They had two children: Anouchka Delon (25 November 1990) and Alain-Fabien Delon (18 March 1994). The relationship ended in 2001.

=== Political opinions ===
Delon described himself as a Gaullist, explaining that he was raised "in the spirit of General de Gaulle". When de Gaulle resigned from the French presidency after losing a nationwide referendum in 1969, Delon told him in a letter: "Always, and even more in these years thanks to you, I was proud to be French," then writing about the result: "I feel with fright a sense of shame that breaks my heart." Delon later supported the center-right candidate Valéry Giscard d'Estaing in his successful 1974 presidential campaign, and again in his failed attempt to be reelected in 1981. He gave his support to Raymond Barre in 1988 and to Nicolas Sarkozy in 2007. In 2017, he endorsed the Gaullist candidate François Fillon, who came third in the presidential election of that year, but said he did not vote in the second run-off between Emmanuel Macron and Marine Le Pen. He later endorsed Valérie Pécresse in 2022, calling her "the only woman he wants to be president".

During an interview in 2013, Delon expressed sympathy for the French far-right National Front's electoral successes, saying: "The National Front, like the MCG [Geneva Citizens' Movement] in Geneva, is very important... I encourage it and I perfectly understand it." However, in another interview in 2018, he denied having ever voted for Marine Le Pen.

Delon was good friends with the Argentine world champion boxer Carlos Monzón, even visiting Monzon during his stint in prison.

In 2022, the 86-year-old Delon was invited by Volodymyr Zelenskyy to travel to Ukraine.

=== Health ===
Delon suffered a stroke in June 2019. He was admitted to hospital after experiencing dizziness and headaches. In August 2019, he was recovering in a Swiss hospital. In September 2022, he began experimental treatment for a slow-progressing lymphoma. In the summer of 2023, Delon's three children made the decision to stop this treatment because it was weakening him.

In a 2021 interview with Paris Match, Delon expressed support for euthanasia, calling it "the most logical and natural thing". In 2022, Delon's son Anthony revealed in his autobiography Entre chien et loup that, following the death of his (Anthony's) mother Nathalie Delon, Alain said he wanted to be removed from life support if he were to succumb to a coma, and had asked Anthony to fulfill his request if such a circumstance arose. Shortly thereafter, some news organizations reported that Delon was planning to imminently end his life through euthanasia, but the reports were adamantly denied by his son, Alain-Fabien, who said that quotes from Anthony Delon's book had been taken out of context.

In January 2024, Delon was reported to be in poor health and living a reclusive lifestyle at his La Brûlerie estate in Douchy. At the same time, a public feud concerning Delon's health arose between three of his children – Anthony, Anouchka and Alain-Fabien – all of whom acknowledge Delon was "ailing but lucid and aware of the feud". The rift began when Anthony publicly accused Anouchka, his half-sister, of "lying" and "manipulation" for concealing the results of cognitive tests Swiss doctors had performed on their father. The children, however, united in mid-2023 to successfully evict Delon's former companion Hiromi Rollin, whom they accused of abusing their father.

=== Death ===
Delon died on 18 August 2024 at his home in Douchy, surrounded by family members, aged 88. He had been diagnosed with B-cell lymphoma earlier in the year. Before his death, Delon requested that his Belgian Shepherd named Loubo be euthanized and buried alongside him, although Delon's family elected to not euthanize the dog.

==== Tributes ====
A number of personalities paid tribute to him, including Brigitte Bardot, Claudia Cardinale, Céline Dion, Costa-Gavras, Patricia Kaas (president of the Cinémathèque française), Gilles Jacob, Jean-Michel Jarre, actors Dany Boon, Arielle Dombasle, Pierre Arditi, Jean Dujardin, Richard Berry, and Patrick Chesnais, writer Éric-Emmanuel Schmitt, Mireille Mathieu, and Carla Bruni. Internationally, actors Sarik Andreasyan, Antonio Banderas, Susana Giménez, Mirtha Legrand, Sophia Loren, Ekaterina Klimova, Ornella Muti, Ottavia Piccolo, Jean-Claude Van Damme, British journalist and television host Piers Morgan, Arturo Pérez-Reverte, and director Jim Jarmusch also paid their respects.

The Academy of Arts and Techniques of Cinema released a statement mourning the loss of "an eternal icon of the seventh art." Alberto Barbera, president of the Venice Film Festival, praised him as "a popular star who left his indelible mark on the works of the greatest authors of European cinema."

Numerous political figures also honored the actor's memory, including Emmanuel Macron, Nicolas Sarkozy, Gabriel Attal, Marine Le Pen, François Fillon, Culture Minister Rachida Dati. French President Emmanuel Macron described him as "melancholic, popular, secretive" while being "more than a star : a French monument." International reactions include those of Matteo Salvini (Deputy Prime Minister of Italy), Lucia Borgonzoni (Italian Secretary of State for Culture), Andriy Yermak (Head of the Secretariat of the President of Ukraine), Nicolae Ciucă (President of the Romanian Senate and former Prime Minister of Romania), Dominique Ouattara (First Lady of Côte d'Ivoire) and Boyko Borissov, (leader of GERB and former Prime Minister of Bulgaria). The Ministry of Culture in Armenia offers its condolences.

On the evening of his death, several French television channels altered their programming to broadcast films featuring Alain Delon throughout his career. The same occurred in Switzerland, China, Italy, and Iran.

The next day, Alain Delon's death made headlines worldwide and garnered significant media attention. Foreign press referred to him as "the last great myth of French Cinema." The New York Times stated that "the intense and intensely beautiful French actor played cold Corsican gangsters as convincingly as passionate Italian lovers." The Guardian praised Alain Delon, calling him "a symbol of the lost beauty of the 1960s." According to the Japan Times, "his idol image and James Dean-like persona made him one of the most acclaimed actors in his country." The series Plus belle la vie paid tribute to him in episode 153 on 22 August 2024, referencing the police series Fabio Montale, filmed in Marseille.

Having declined any national tribute and ceremony, Alain Delon was buried on 24 August 2024, in a private chapel on the Brûlerie estate in Douchy, as he wished, near his thirty-five dogs. About fifty guests attended the funeral, including the actor's three children. The ceremony was officiated by Catholic bishop Jean-Michel Di Falco.

During his lifetime and after his passing, tributes to Alain Delon take place in numerous countries around the world, reflecting the actor's international stature. In the United States, the American French Film Festival (TAFFF), the Cinémathèque Américaine, and the American Film Institute organize screenings and retrospectives in his honor.

In Brazil, the Varilux French Cinema Festival, the largest French film festival outside of France, also pays tribute to him by screening Plein Soleil and featuring him on the official poster for its 2024 edition. The French Film Festival in Cuba organized a tribute to Alain Delon during its 25th edition, screening many of the actor's films in theaters in Havana.

In Asia, from December 16, 2024, to January 16, 2025, the retrospective Remember Alain Delon in Hanoi, Vietnam, showcases three of his iconic films on the continent: Red Sun, The Red Circle, and Plein Soleil. In Tokyo, the Institut Français du Japon organizes a retrospective titled Proof of a Star's Existence, featuring screenings of his major works, conferences, and discussions led by film specialists. The 40th edition of the French Film Festival in Singapore pays homage to Delon with screenings of Le Samouraï and Plein Soleil.

In Europe, the Ciné Lumière at the Institut français du Royaume-Uni dedicate retrospectives to the actor. In his honor, the French Embassy and the Institut Français of Bulgaria organize screenings of Rocco and His Brothers in the country's three largest cities.

The 2024 Angoulême Francophone Film Festival, taking place a few days after Alain Delon's death, changed its programming to screen Notre histoire by Bertrand Blier. The 2024 Lumière Festival concluded with a screening of Plein Soleil (1960) by René Clément and a speech by Anthony Delon, who recounted his father's career.

During the opening ceremony of the 2024 Venice Film Festival, images of Gena Rowlands, Roberto Herlitzka, and Alain Delon were projected in tribute.

In October 2024, the Paris Council voted on a proposal to name a street or facility in the capital in honor of Alain Delon, which included the installation of a plaque in his name on the Normandie building on the Champs-Élysées (8th arrondissement).

Delon featured in In Memoriam segments of 2025 BAFTA and SAG Awards ceremonies. However, the French actor was not included in the "In Memoriam" segment at the 2025 Oscars. At the opening of the 50th César Awards, a tribute was paid to Alain Delon with a sequence retracing the actor's career.

== Influence and legacy ==
=== Reception ===
Alain Delon is one of the best-known French actors abroad, alongside Gérard Depardieu, Jean Reno, Catherine Deneuve, and Audrey Tautou. Jean-Michel Frodon, a film critic and historian, points out that in post-war French cinema, Delon is a unique figure, whose energy and intelligence on screen were superbly exploited by filmmakers such as Jean-Pierre Melville. According to Nick Rees-Roberts and Darren Waldron, "Few male European actors have been as iconic and influential for generations of filmgoers as Alain Delon." They consider his status as a cinema icon and the longevity of his career as making a scholarly inquiry into his image and persona necessary. LaCinetek and The Criterion Collection have unveiled several lists wherein various professionals in the field recommend and/or specify their favorite films. Several of the productions in which Delon plays the leading role are cited.

Many contemporary filmmakers such as Daniel Brühl, Michael Douglas, Stephen Frears, Jack Huston, Aaron Taylor-Johnson, Kyle MacLachlan, Mickey Rourke, Mark Strong, Quentin Tarantino, Bruce Willis, have expressed respect or admiration for Alain Delon's career, roles, style, and longevity.

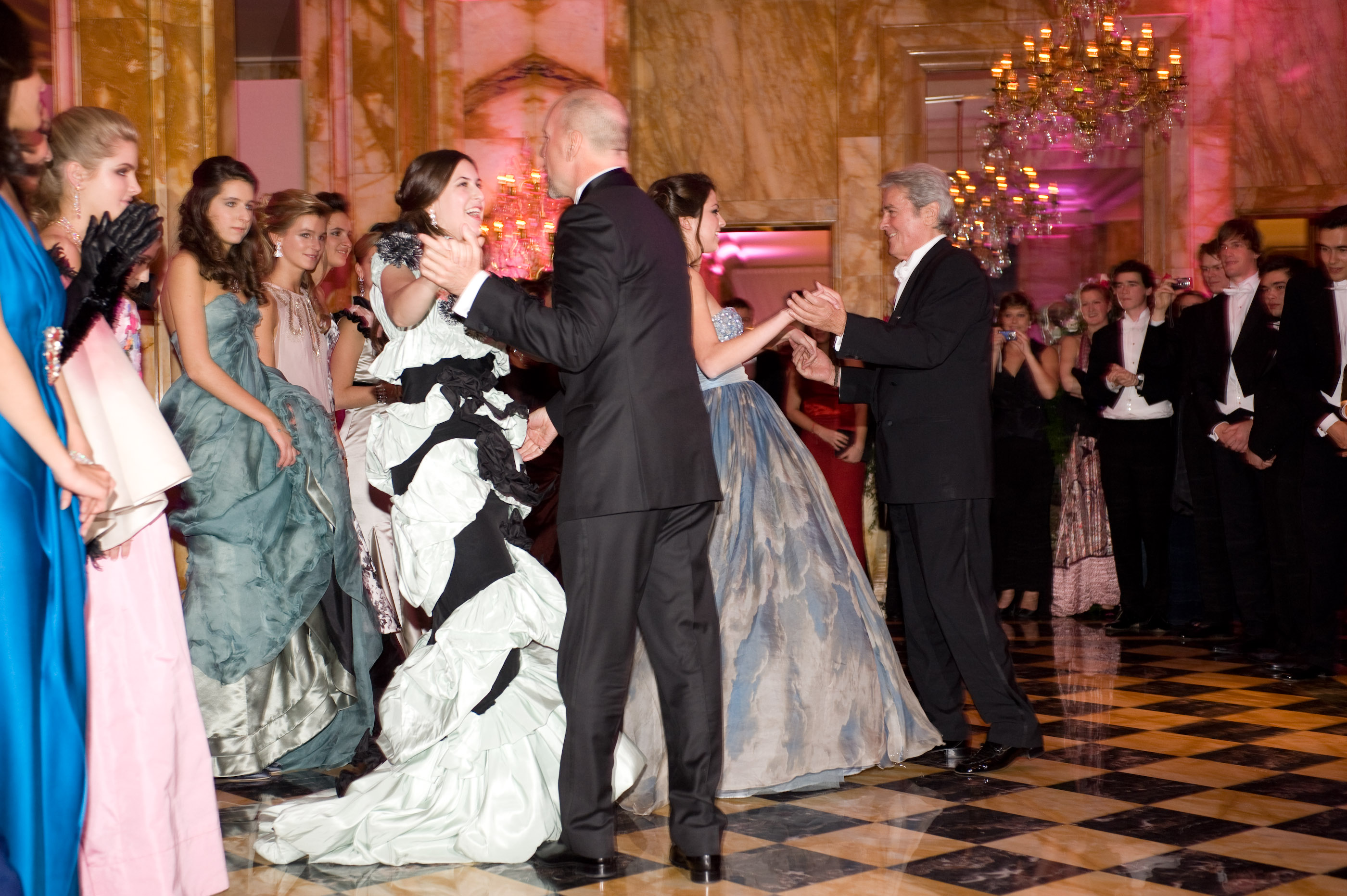
Alain Delon and Bruce Willis with their respective daughters Anouchka and Scout LaRue - Le Bal des débutantes - Paris - 2008

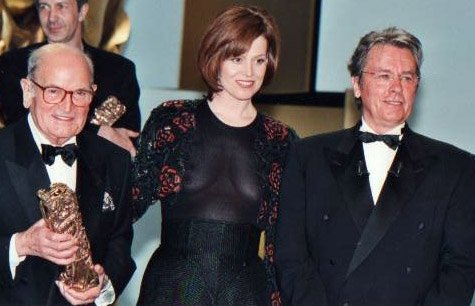
Georges Cravenne - Sigourney Weaver - Alain Delon

Leonardo DiCaprio regards Alain Delon as one of the "coolest actors in the history of cinema". The Canadian actor Keanu Reeves asserts that Delon is his role model as an actor: "He's such a charismatic actor. I think he has something in him between tension and melancholy." British director Matthew Vaughn compares actor Michael Caine to Alain Delon, suggesting the unique cinematic influence of these two actors in their respective countries. British actor Clive Owen says he is fascinated by Alain Delon's "natural grace", considering Le Samouraï and La Piscine among his favorite films. Joseph Losey, an American director, expressed his admiration for Alain Delon, saying, "Alain is one of those rare talents who can be honored as being difficult. To me, this word means professionalism, demand, dedication to work, warmth, and love. He's not a man to play with, but a man you can rely on." American producer Robert Evans paid tribute to Delon in his memoirs The Kid Stays in the Picture – Hyperion Books, 1994, considering him as his "brother in life as in cinema" and "the most beautiful actor in Europe".

=== Cinematic influence ===
Alain Delon's interpretations have influenced many colleagues, both in France and internationally, especially thanks to his role in Le Samouraï (The Samurai), often cited as one of the most influential films in history. Director Jean-Pierre Melville wrote the film for Alain Delon and describes the genesis of this film:

Suddenly, [Delon] looked at his watch and stopped me: "You've been reading the script for seven-and-a-half minutes and there hasn't been a word of dialogue … that's good enough for me. I'll do the film. What's the title?" Le samouraï I told him … and he then led me to his bedroom: all it contained was a leather couch and a samurai lance, his sword and dagger.

Director Bertrand Blier speculates that the meeting between Alain Delon and the filmmaker Jean-Pierre Melville, "historic, charged with a mutual fascination", was at the origin of the success of this classic: "The Samurai was a completely bizarre film. There has only been one film made like this in France. And it's so much like Delon, this film: a mute, completely narcissistic role, where practically nothing happens. Delon sits in front of a mirror for an hour correcting the position of his hat! It had a lot of charm, it was a fascinating film. It was an extraordinary analysis of these two men, a formidable joint portrait of Melville / Delon".

Stephen Teo calls Le Samouraï "possibly the most influential French crime thriller ever made, a mixture of a police procedural (le film policier) and a suspenseful action thriller concentrated on a professional hit man, Jef (spelled with one "f") Costello, played by Alain Delon, giving the definitive performance of his career".

Delon and Melville crystallize a film cited as one of the most influential in history, which will become an essential reference for many filmmakers. Many New Hollywood films and critical successes such as William Friedkin's The French Connection (1971) and Francis Ford Coppola's The Conversation (1974) contain explicit references to Le Samouraï and the character of Jef Costello played by Delon.

==== Personal and stylistic influence ====
Alain Delon is cited as one of "the most beautiful actors in the history of cinema". His on-screen presence and physical appearance have earned him the status of an "icon" and a "legend" of cinema, both in France and internationally. His fame, linked as much to his looks as to his acting, has inspired and continues to influence many international actors.

Only a few films draw more inspiration from Delon's distinctive style and personality rather than his acting performance.

===== European productions =====
- The German film Liebe ist kälter als der Tod pays tribute to French cinema masters such as Claude Chabrol and Éric Rohmer. Furthermore, the directing style is inspired by Melville's Le Samouraï, while the artwork on the poster resembles the silhouette of Alain Delon in Le Samouraï. The character Bruno (Ulli Lommel) is also inspired by the character portrayed by Delon.
- The influence of French cinema on Italian cinema is significant, particularly in the neo-noir or poliziottesco genre. This cinematic movement found in Alain Delon a representative figure of the cold, methodical hitman. The character of Jef Costello, portrayed by Delon in Le Samouraï (1967), had a major impact on Fernando Di Leo and his Milieu Trilogy (Caliber 9, The Italian Connection, Il Boss).
- Luc Besson drew inspiration from Jef Costello (played by Delon in Le Samouraï) to create Léon, the titular character embodied by Jean Reno in Léon: The Professional.
- The protagonist of Bad Education (La mala educación), played by Gael García Bernal, was inspired by Patricia Highsmith's Tom Ripley, as portrayed by Alain Delon in René Clément's Purple Noon (Plein Soleil). He stated that the performance he most sought to emulate was Delon's interpretation of Ripley in Purple Noon.
- In The Skin I Live In (La piel que habito), Pedro Almodóvar instructed Antonio Banderas to draw inspiration from Alain Delon's performance in Le Cercle Rouge, aiming for a portrayal that was “icy, calculating, restrained, and economical.”
- Richard Ayoade cites The Samurai as a major inspiration for his films. In Submarine, Oliver Tate's character wears the same costume as Delon in The Samurai and displays a poster of the film in his room, out of admiration for the character he plays. Some scenes in the film are directly inspired by the French classic.
- The film Final Cut : Mesdames et Messieurs by György Pálfi combines scenes from over 450 international movies, including one in which Alain Delon is seen exchanging glances with Marilyn Monroe.
- Fabio Grassadonia and Antonio Piazza, in Salvo, sought to recreate the aura of French film noir and specifically drew inspiration from Delon for their protagonist. Their choice of Saleh Bakri to play Salvo, a Sicilian hitman, stemmed from this vision: “We wanted a strong physical presence that would dominate the screen with charisma, thinking of Jean-Pierre Melville, French film noir, and actors like Alain Delon.”
- The film A Bigger Splash, directed by Luca Guadagnino, is a modern adaptation of the French thriller La Piscine by Jacques Deray. A loose adaptation of the French film, Guadagnino has soaked up the atmosphere and erotic tension that Delon and Romy Schneider represented in 1969. Matthias Schoenaerts takes over the role played by Delon.
- Pierre Niney in A Perfect Man works to recreate a resemblance to the character played by Delon in Purple Noon.
- In A Whale by Pablo Hernando, the main character, played by Ingrid García-Jonsson (a hitwoman), is inspired by Jef Costello. The director confirms this influence: "I understand the comparisons, but I didn't mix references. The only one I used was the archetype of Alain Delon's lone hitman (...)." Additionally, the name of the main antagonist, Melville, is a tribute to Jean-Pierre Melville, the director of Le Samouraï.
- Saul Nanni takes over the role of Tancredi Falconeri in the series The Leopard, previously played by Alain Delon in 1963. The actor says he is honored to play such an "iconic" character and to be able to follow in the footsteps of an actor as "incredible" as Delon, without being afraid of being confronted with this "icon". To prepare for the role of Tancredi, he reread Giuseppe Tomasi di Lampedusa's novel and rewatched Visconti's film, trying to understand the twists and turns of the family and social dynamics of the Sicilian aristocracy of the 1860s.

===== American productions =====
- The overall atmosphere, character development, and narrative style of the American film The French Connection are largely influenced by Le Samouraï (1967) by Jean-Pierre Melville. William Friedkin also drew inspiration from the character played by Alain Delon—a solitary and methodical hitman—to shape the character of Popeye Doyle (Gene Hackman). Moreover, the subway chase scene in The French Connection is directly inspired by Bullitt and Le Samouraï.
- Through his portrayal of Jef Costello, Alain Delon established the archetype of the "silent and stoic antihero." Ryan O'Neal's character in The Driver is almost entirely based on Jef Costello. The Driver is also considered an unofficial adaptation of Le Samouraï.
- In Rocco and His Brothers, Delon plays the character of Rocco Parondi, a tormented young man, a street wrestler who has become famous and has a tumultuous career in an Italian family in the 1940s. The film influenced a number of filmmakers, including Martin Scorsese, who closely studied Visconti's directing, especially the way the fight scenes are filmed, a technique he later integrated into his Raging Bull. In addition, Scorsese was inspired for this same film by the character of Rocco (Delon) to help shape Robert De Niro's interpretation of Jake LaMotta.
- While filming American Gigolo, screenwriter and director Paul Schrader had Richard Gere watch several films starring Delon to draw inspiration from his performance: “I screened Purple Noon for Richard Gere before American Gigolo. I said: ‘Watch this guy [Alain Delon]. The way he walks. He knows the room is a better place just because he's walked into it.’” Richard Gere also cites the French actor as a source of inspiration: “It was by watching Alain Delon's films that I learned how to play seducers on screen. Alain Delon truly inspired me to portray that kind of character.”
- Le Samouraï is one of Quentin Tarantino's favorite films. In a 1992 interview, Tarantino said he liked the title Reservoir Dogs because “it sounds like it's from an Alain Delon film by Jean-Pierre Melville... I could picture Alain Delon in a black suit saying: ‘I'm Mr. Blonde.’” The French classic influenced his creation of the world of Reservoir Dogs and Pulp Fiction. In this regard, the costume design for Reservoir Dogs and Pulp Fiction stemmed from a discussion between Tarantino and costume designer Betsy Heimann about French noir films featuring Alain Delon.
- Michael Mann, for Heat (just like for Collateral), creates the character of Neil McCauley, played by Robert De Niro, drawing inspiration from the minimalist and detached style of Delon in Le Samouraï and the various protagonists Melville portrays in Le Cercle Rouge. The line "I am alone, not lonely" from McCauley (De Niro in Heat) directly echoes the one from Jeff Costello (Delon in Le Samouraï) : "I never lose, never really".
- Forest Whitaker also drew inspiration from Delon's role as Jef Costello in Le Samouraï for his performance in Ghost Dog: The Way of the Samurai by Jim Jarmusch : “As part of my preparation, I watched this masterpiece with Alain Delon. Thanks to him, I understood the virtue of silence.” The film's ending openly pays homage to Le Samouraï, as both Alain Delon and Ghost Dog carry an unloaded firearm in a scenario where they are fully aware of their impending fate. Whitaker would later reprise a role originally played by Alain Delon in Deux Hommes dans la ville (Two Men in Town), adapting it to a contemporary setting.
- To prepare for his role as Vincent in Collateral, Tom Cruise stated that he “first watched several films about professional killers, including Le Samouraï by Jean-Pierre Melville with Alain Delon. I was [Tom Cruise] deeply fascinated by his solitary and melancholic charisma in carrying out his ruthless business.” Cruise's appearance and demeanor in the film strongly recall Jef Costello from Le Samouraï.
- The film by Anton Corbijn, The American (inspired by Melville's Le Samouraï) stars George Clooney as an assassin, who resembles Costello. Clooney also draws inspiration from Delon for his role in Out of Sight.
- Delon's influence also extends to films such as Drive by Nicolas Winding Refn and Baby Driver by Edgar Wright. Both directors drew inspiration from Le Samouraï, crafting protagonists—played by Ryan Gosling and Ansel Elgort, respectively—who are taciturn yet charismatic getaway drivers, reminiscent of Jef Costello. Ryan Gosling has stated that his acting in Drive was influenced by Delon's performance in Le Samouraï .
- In developing The Equalizer film franchise, director Antoine Fuqua acknowledged that Delon influenced the character of Robert McCall, a solitary man with strong moral motivations who acts as a vigilante for those unable to defend themselves. Played by Denzel Washington, Fuqua explained: “My biggest inspirations were foreign films from the 1970s, really […]. And of course, all those Alain Delon films, particularly the French ones, like Le Samouraï (1967), with that kind of slow rhythm and character development as the story unfolds. That's the kind of film that inspires me.”
- Keanu Reeves, in John Wick: Chapter 4, plays a fearsome hitman but imbued with a certain emotional depth, imitating Alain Delon, whom Reeves has as a model. Chad Stahelski, the director behind the John Wick franchise, is also a great admirer of Alain Delon and Jean-Pierre Melville. Stahelski drew inspiration from Le Cercle Rouge and Le Samouraï when crafting John Wick : "The John Wick films are all love letters from Keanu, myself, our stunt team and our creative team to everyone from Wong Kar-wai to Sammo Hung to Sergio Leone, Kurosawa, Alain Delon and "The Samurai", Spielberg, Tarantino... To all those people we loved growing up."
- Michael Fassbender is inspired in David Fincher's The Killer by the character played by Alain Delon in Melville's The Samurai.
- Jon Watts (director of the Spider-Man trilogy) cites Alain Delon among his influences, with The Samurai which he considers a model of "lone wolf movies", inspiring the creation of the characters of George Clooney and Brad Pitt in Wolfs. In addition, the film begins in a fictionally deluxe suite named Delon Hotel, an obvious nod to the French actor.
- In the 2024 remake of The Killer, John Woo pays explicit tribute to Delon by setting the action in Paris.
- Forty years after American Gigolo, Paul Schrader once again turned to Richard Gere, asking him to draw inspiration from Alain Delon for his role in Oh, Canada.
- Delon is indirectly responsible for the ongoing superhero franchise films which continue to this day. After seeing a poster for Delon's 1974 cinematic turn as Zorro while in Paris, Ilya Salkind was inspired to make 1978's Superman with Christopher Reeve, the film that started it all.

===== Asian productions =====
From South Korea to China, numerous filmmakers have drawn inspiration from Alain Delon's career, particularly his portrayal of Jeff Costello in Le Samouraï (1967).

- John Woo chose Chow Yun-fat for the role of Mark Lee in A Better Tomorrow (1986) because of his resemblance to Alain Delon. In the film and its sequels, Chow also wore sunglasses that were marketed under Delon's name. The sunglasses brand became especially popular in Hong Kong, and Alain Delon personally thanked Chow Yun-fat for it.
- Chow Yun-Fat, in John Woo's The Killer, does not merely reprise Alain Delon's role in Le Samouraï; he embodies a character who dreams of being Alain Delon. Woo specifically asked Chow to take inspiration from Delon's acting, seeing him as the embodiment of French charm: “handsome, brooding, and dangerous.”
- Tony Leung, in his role as the undercover inspector in Hard Boiled, adopts characteristics reminiscent of Delon's Le Samouraï. His character is even named after Alain Delon—he is called Alan.
- Johnnie To's films frequently pay homage to Delon's work, with Fulltime Killer and Vengeance serving as notable examples. A great admirer of Melville and his films Le Cercle Rouge and Le Samouraï, To has often expressed his desire to work with Alain Delon. Although Delon ultimately declined the lead role in Vengeance, To retained the character Francis Costello—his name a direct reference to Jeff Costello from Le Samouraï.
- Kim Jee-woon, director of A Bittersweet Life, instructed lead actor Lee Byung-hun to take inspiration from Delon's performances in Jean-Pierre Melville's films. The protagonist of A Bittersweet Life, named "Jeff" after Costello, is a direct descendant of Jeff Costello, sharing the same traits as the betrayed, solitary assassin.
- In Pang Ho-Cheung's comedy You Shoot, I Shoot, Eric Kot plays a hitman who idolizes Jeff Costello, dressing like him and even speaking to a Le Samouraï movie poster in his apartment.
- South Korean actor Jung Woo Sung also drew inspiration from Alain Delon's performance in Le Samouraï for his first criminal role in Cold Eyes.
- Kazakh filmmaker Adilkhan Yerzhanov's Yellow Cat features a solitary character roaming the vast Kazakh steppes while donning the trench coat and fedora made iconic by Alain Delon in Le Samouraï. The character sees himself as the guardian of a unique talent: the ability to imitate Alain Delon. He envisions himself as the French actor, fully embodying his cinematic persona.

==== Others ====
Rocco Siffredi chose his stage name in reference to the characters Roch Siffredi (Borsalino and Borsalino & Co) and Rocco Parondi (Rocco and his brothers), both played by Alain Delon. Hong Kong actor Ti Lung chose his stage name from a verbal derivation close to the name of his favorite actor Alain Delon.

Borsalino, a film released in 1969, tells the adventures of Roch Siffredi and François Cappella, two gangsters in Marseille in the 1930s. Played by Alain Delon and Jean-Paul Belmondo, Borsalino marks their only collaboration. This tandem, made up of two of the most popular French actors, inspired Robert Redford and Paul Newman to stage The Sting in 1973.

Ilaria Urbinati, stylist for Ryan Reynolds, Bradley Cooper, and Donald Glover among others, counts Alain Delon as one of the style icons who inspire her: "Alain Delon, a young Pacino and a young DeNiro are my all-time style icons. And probably Paul Newman at all ages. They'll keep you right."

Playwright Adrienne Kennedy was an admirer of Delon. A mystery novella by Kennedy, Deadly Triplets featured a fictional version of Kennedy who has written a play titled, The Heart Of Alain Delon.

=== International recognition ===
During the four years Delon lived with Romy Schneider, he became a leading man in movie roles, and an international sex symbol. According to media commentator Mark Gallagher, Delon's reputation ultimately may be as a worldwide style icon, rather than as an actor. He writes that Delon's on-screen sex appeal is well received in many cultural contexts, that it allowed him to transcend strictly French film and culture, and connected him to "international film culture and popular culture".

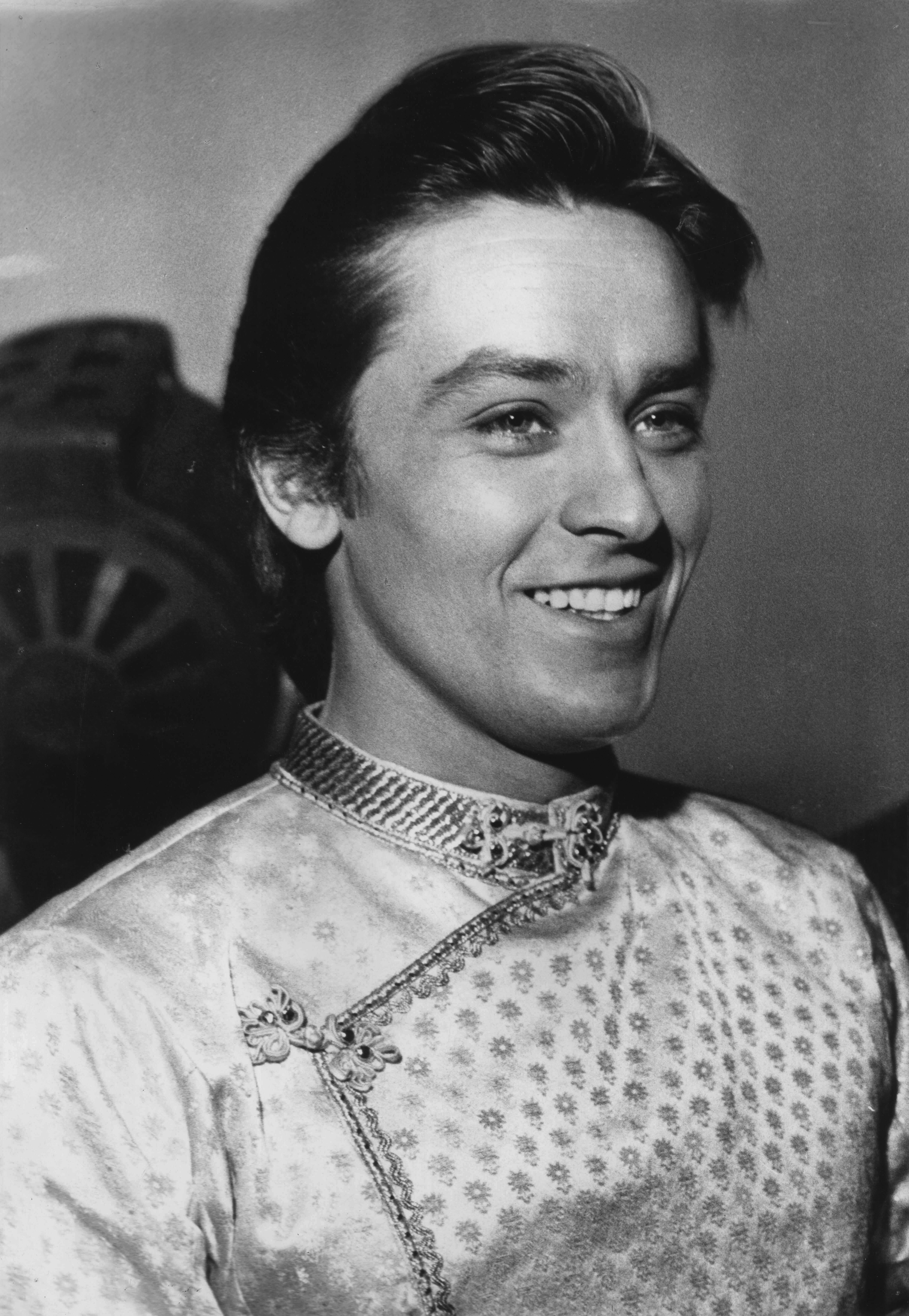
Delon filming the aborted Marco Polo in Belgrade, 1962

Delon was offered roles in several iconic productions, thus illustrating the international recognition bestowed upon him. For instance, he was invited by Sam Spiegel (the film's producer) to portray Sherif Ali in Lawrence of Arabia. Despite a successful audition, difficulties related to wearing brown contact lenses for the role led the French actor to decline the offer. Robert Evans also considered Alain Delon for the role of Michael Corleone in The Godfather, stating, "That's how he was described in the book." Delon, however, refused the proposal : “I would have had to learn to speak English with an Italian accent. I didn't like that.” Evans also wanted to cast Delon in The Cotton Club to play Lucky Luciano, a role that ultimately went to Joe Dallesandro. Additionally, in 1979, Albert Broccoli, in charge of the James Bond franchise, offered Delon the role of James Bond. Delon refused. Director André Téchiné planned to bring Delon and Isabelle Adjani together on screen in a film adaptation of Pascal Bruckner's novel Evil Angels. Disagreements between the two actors led to the project's cancellation, and Roman Polanski ultimately directed Bitter Moon in 1992. In 1973, director and screenwriter Alejandro Jodorowsky embarked on the cinematic adaptation of Dune. Jodorowsky assembled a prestigious artistic team, including rock bands Pink Floyd and Magma for the music. Jodorowsky also envisioned an ambitious cast: Salvador Dalí, Orson Welles, and Mick Jagger among others. Alain Delon was slated to portray the character of Duncan Idaho. However, anticipating a 14-hour film, the project was abandoned due to significant financial constraints (Dalí notably demanding $100,000 per hour). Alain Delon was among Anne Rice's top choices for the role of Louis, as depicted in her book Interview with the Vampire, which was under discussion for a film adaptation. However, the project didn't come to fruition until 1994, with Brad Pitt ultimately taking on the role. Alain Delon was also slated to appear in the adaptation of André Malraux's novel Man's Fate, alongside Johnny Depp, Daniel Day-Lewis, Uma Thurman, and John Malkovich. This project, initiated by Michael Cimino, was abandoned due to financial difficulties. In 2014, a film project titled Patient was announced, a drama centered on the Armenian genocide, with Delon or Adrien Brody in a leading role. Dustin Hoffman was also set to star. This project never materialized.

According to the American Film Institute, Delon was considered for roles in Joshua Logan's Fanny (1961), Tony Richardson's The Loved One (1965), Sydney Pollack's This Property Is Condemned (1966), Henri Verneuil's The Scavengers (1968), and John Huston's Escape to Victory (1981).

Among other roles Delon declined were Magnet of Doom (L’Aîné des Ferchaux) by Jean-Pierre Melville, Viva Maria! by Louis Malle, The Bear and the Doll by Michel Deville, Max and the Junkmen by Claude Sautet, Last Tango in Paris by Bernardo Bertolucci (Delon suggested Marlon Brando for the part), Taxi Driver by Martin Scorsese, Close Encounters of the Third Kind by Steven Spielberg, Death Watch by Bertrand Tavernier, Marie Antoinette by Sofia Coppola, Pardonnez-moi by Maïwenn, Mesrine by Jean-François Richet, Vengeance by Johnnie To, A Gang Story by Olivier Marchal, and Salaud, on t'aime by Claude Lelouch.

=== Influence in music ===
A still shot of Delon in The Unvanquished appears on the cover of the 1986 album The Queen Is Dead by The Smiths, which was used with his written approval. The song "Beautiful Killer" on Madonna's twelfth studio album MDNA is a tribute to Delon. An early EP by the music group White Town was the "Alain Delon EP". The song "A Look From The Screen" by Russian band Nautilus Pompilius is a tribute to Delon. In 2010, Emma Daumas paid tribute to Alain Delon in the song Dans les yeux d'Alain Delon, on her E.P. Acoustic. Far from this chorus of praise, Marianne Faithfull, a friend of Nico's and who was Delon's partner in the cinema in the 1960s, mentions the actor on her album Kissin' Time. The Italian music group Baustelle (La canzione di Alain Delon), the Bulgarian music group Shturtzite (Alen Delon), Christoff de Bolle (Ich hab Alain Delon gesehn), Erlend Krauser (Deneuve Meets Alain Delon in The Train), Davide Van De Sfroos (L'Alain Delon de Lenn), Dann Stuyven (Dîner Delon), Sıla Gençoğlu and Ozan Doğulu (Alain Delon) and Femme Schmidt (Alain Delon) have all quoted and/or paid tribute to Alain Delon in their musical productions.

=== Cultural and popular representations ===
==== In Cinema ====
In La Boum by Claude Pinoteau, both Vic (Sophie Marceau) and Lysia (Nathalie Riqué) have feelings for Mathieu. Jealous of her rival, Vic describes her as “the daughter of Alain Delon and the Mona Lisa,” implying the extraordinary nature of her beauty.

In Tiger on the Beat, Francis (Chow Yun-fat) reads out a list of names while filling his glass with raw eggs, making a pun on the word "Lung" (meaning "dragon" in Chinese). Every name he mentions contains “Lung”: Bruce Lee (Lei Siu-Lung), Jackie Chan (Sing Lung), Alain Delon (Ah Lan Daai Lung), Sylvester Stallone (Si Taai Lung), and Ti Lung.

In the film Camping, one of the campers (played by Frédéric Bonnet) is nicknamed Alain Delon and speaks in the third person. In both Camping and Camping 2, lines also reference Delon and his public persona.

In Asterix at the Olympic Games, Alain Delon plays Julius Caesar and pokes fun at his own career with a self-referential monologue: “Caesar has succeeded at everything, conquered everything. He's a leopard, a samurai, he owes nothing to anyone—not to Rocco, nor his brothers, nor the Sicilian clan. Caesar is of noble blood. In fact, the Caesar for Best Emperor was awarded to Caesar. Ave me!”

In One Day, Dexter's mother (played by Patricia Clarkson) compares her husband to Alain Delon: “Is that Alain Delon? What? No. That's your father,” showing just how in love she is with him.

Other humorous references to Alain Delon appear in Les Tuche, notably in a scene where Jeff Tuche (Jean-Paul Rouve) arrives at a luxury hotel in Monaco. When the receptionist announces the Alain Delon suite, Jeff, confused, says: “Wait, I don't know Alain Delon, I don't want to disturb him.” To which the receptionist replies: “But he's not here.”

==== In visual art ====
In the first episode of Cobra, Delon appears through the features of the main character—dark-haired and brooding—who, in order to escape his enemies, undergoes plastic surgery that makes him look like Jean-Paul Belmondo.

Alain Delon's appearance also inspired the character Freeman, the hero of the manga Crying Freeman, written by Kazuo Koike and illustrated by Ryōichi Ikegami. Ryoichi Ikegami confessed his love for the actor.

The manga and anime series Beelzebub feature an extensive cast of fictional characters created by Ryūhei Tamura. One of the key characters is Batim do Emuna Alaindelon, a demon. The character mentioned is directly inspired by Freddie Mercury and is named after Alain Delon.

The Italian comic strip Playcolt (128 issues divided into four series from 1972 to 1979) features Alain Velon (Paronomase of the actor Alain Delon), a billionaire playboy with a Delonian physique who later transforms into Playcolt, a kind of superhero.

Monkey Punch is inspired by several French films and actors to create the relationships between his characters in his manga Lupin III. The Alain Delon-Charles Bronson duo in Adieu l'ami influences the interactions between Lupin and his accomplice Daisuke Jigen.

Alain Delon's influence in Le Samouraï can also be felt in the comic strip Corps et Âme by Jef and Matz. In Body and Soul, the main character is Frank Kitchen, a fearsome and methodical hitman. The resemblance to Costello (played by Delon in Le Samouraï) is reflected not only in the character's physical appearance, but also in his behavior and stoic attitude in the face of adversity. As in The Samurai, where Delon's character is betrayed and must navigate a series of unforeseen challenges, Frank Kitchen finds himself in a new situation after an extreme revenge that transforms him physically.

Lost Bullets, a comic book written by Walter Hill, features protagonist Roy Nash about a professional killer who has received a life sentence in the Joliet prison in Illinois. Jef, the cartoonist, says that he chose to be inspired by the French actor to create Roy Nash's appearance because he appreciates Delon and his films.

Michaël Sanlaville, an award-winning cartoonist in Angoulême in 2015 for Lastman, found his inspiration in the works of Frédéric Dard from a very young age. Having discovered the novels of San Antonio in his parents' attic, he decided to adapt these works into comic books. To embody San-Antonio, Sanlaville chose to base himself on the image of Alain Delon. His sculptural face and piercing gaze perfectly embody the handsome, irreproachable and hieratic hero described by Dard.

A significant part of the work of Russian artist and academician Nikas Stepanovich Safronov focuses on his series titled River of Time, where he portrays various modern personalities, whether famous politicians, actors, or pop music stars. Among those depicted are Alla Pugacheva, Sophia Loren, Pierre Cardin, Elton John, and Alain Delon. These paintings have been acquired by collectors at major national and international exhibitions, and most of them are now displayed in private collections and renowned museums in Russia and Europe.

==== Video games ====
The Hitman video game series pays tribute to Jean-Pierre Melville's film Le Samouraï. Agent 47, the game's contract killer, is both inspired by and a direct reference to the hitman portrayed by Delon in Le Samouraï.

==== Others ====
Guillaume Delorme played Alain Delon in 2009 in a German TV movie, Romy, directed by Torsten C. Fisher and retracing his love story with Romy Schneider. Alain Delon is the main subject of a play inspired by his career and the world of Jean-Pierre Melville, Alain Delon or almost, of Stéphane Dolivet. The play was premiered in July 2007 at the Avignon Festival. It was revived in a new version in 2010, Alain Delon... and me.

Alain Delon's puppet in Les Guignols de l'info expresses himself in a grandiloquent way, speaking of himself in the third person.

Bulgarian poet Georgi Konstantinov wrote a humorous poem called Момичето със син балон (The Girl with the Blue Balloon) which was adapted by the popular Bulgarian rock band Shturtsite as lyrics for their 1982 hit called Ален Делон (Alain Delon). In it the actor was compared to a balloon which will burst in the end.

== Influences ==
Delon's favourite actor was John Garfield. He also admired Jean Marais, Montgomery Clift, Marlon Brando and Robert Walker.

== Awards and honours ==
Delon received numerous film and entertainment awards throughout his career. He was also honored at the "Men of the Year 2001" ceremony with the World Actor 2001 trophy in Vienna, at the Imperial Hofburg palace in Austria. Delon's professional awards include:

- 1961 Ciak d'oro Prize: Awarded with Monica Vitti for the Eclipse
- Crystal Stars 1962: Best Actor for The Joy of Living
- French Film Victories 1963: Best French Actor for Any Number Can Win
- David di Donatello Award 1972: Special Award
- Valentino d'Oro 1974: Actor of the Year Award
- Kangouro d'Or: Award presented in 1977 in Dakar
- Golden Horse Awards Ceremony 1981: Special Prize
- César Award 1985: Best Actor for Our Story
- Bambi Awards 1987: International Bambi
- Taormina Film Festival 1989: Career Award
- Sant Jordi Film Awards 1991: Special Jury Prize for Best Film (The Leopard), presented by the Spanish Minister of Culture Jordi Solé Tura.
- At the 45th Berlin International Film Festival, he won the Honorary Golden Bear.
- Mar del Plata International Film Festival 1997: Lifetime Achievement Award presented by Norma Aleandro
- Goldene Kamera 1998: Golden Camera (for his entire career: Belmondo receives the same award on the same day)
- Cairo International Film Festival 1999: Career Achievement Award
- Moscow International Film Festival 1998: Honorary George for Career Achievement
- Flaiano Prize 1999: Career Award
- Mostra de València-Cinema del Mediterrani: Special Palme
- World Actor 2001 Trophy: presented by Mikhail Gorbachev at the Men of the Year 2001 ceremony
- UN and UNICEF International Award for Best Actor of the Year (2003)
- Marrakech International Film Festival 2003: Golden Star
- Faces of Love Film Festival 2005: Silver Arrow
- DIVA – Deutscher Entertainment Preis: DIVA Honorary Award
- French Excellence Award 2009
- Brutus du cinéma 2009: Best César
- Telezvezda TV Channel Award 2011: Special Award as Guest of Honour
- Acapulco Film Festival 2011: Special Award Acuerdate de Acapulco
- Locarno International Film Festival 2012: Lifetime Achievement Award
- Chinese Film Festival in France 2012: guest of honor
- Armenian Music Awards 2012: Special Prize
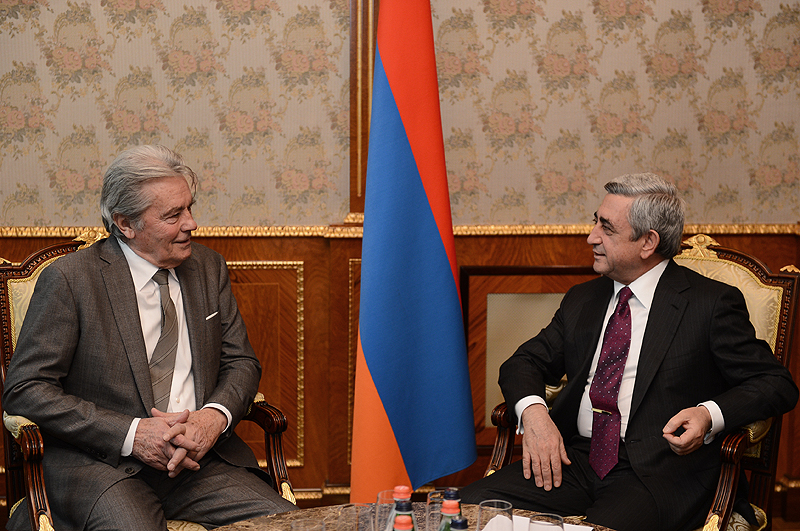
  Delon and Sargsyan (2012).
- Gérard du cinéma 2012: Gérard for the role of his life (nominated)
- Transylvanian International Film Festival 2017: Career Achievement Award
- At the 2019 Cannes Film Festival, he received the Honorary Palme d'Or.

=== Government decorations ===
Delon also received French and foreign government decorations:

- Officier (Officer) of the Ordre national du Mérite in 1995.
- Chevalier (Knight) of the Légion d'honneur on 21 February 1991. He was promoted to Officier (Officer) in 2005.
- Commander of the Order of Arts and Letters (26 May 1986)
- Commandeur (Commander) of the Order of Ouissam Alouite in 2003 by Prince Moulay Rachid of Morocco.
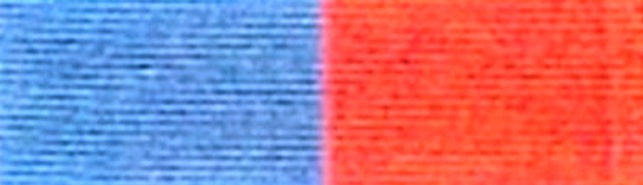
- Grand Vermeil Medal of the City of Paris, presented by Mayor Bertrand Delanoë (2006)
- Chevalier of the Order of Merit for significant personal contribution to strengthening interstate cooperation, supporting state sovereignty and territorial integrity of Ukraine, popularizing the Ukrainian state in the world (by decree of President Zelensky dated September 4, 2023).

== Filmography ==
Delon's most acclaimed films include Purple Noon (1960), Rocco and His Brothers (1960), L'Eclisse (1962), The Leopard (1963), Le Samouraï (1967), La Piscine (1969), Le Cercle Rouge (1970), and Monsieur Klein (1976).

== Bibliography ==
Documentaries

=== In French ===
- Alain Delon, cet inconnu, Philippe Kohly, 2015.
- Alain Delon, la beauté du diable et les femmes, Antoine Lassaigne, 2018.
- Alain Delon, la solitude d’un fauve, Laurent Allen-Caron, 2019.
- Alain Delon, l'ombre au tableau, Daisy d'Errata, Karl Zéro, 2021.
- Romy et Alain, les éternels fiancés, Olivier Monssens, 2022.
- Alain Delon, confidentiel, Fabrice Babin, 2022.
- Delon, l’explosion d’une famille, Yves Couant, Jérémie Paire, Stéphanie Zenati, David Couloume, Fabrice Babin, with Manuela Braun and Floriane Soyer, 2024.
- Alain Delon : la guerre fratricide, Nathalie Renoux, 2024.
- Le Mystère Alain Delon, Nabila Zaknoun, 2024.

=== In English ===
- Discovering Alain Delon, Lyndy Saville, 2015

=== In Russian ===
- Ален Делон. Легенды мирового кино (Alain Delon: Legends of World Cinema), Andrei Istratov, 2010.
- Ален Делон. Уникальный портрет (Alain Delon: A Unique Portrait), 2024.
- Books on Alain Delon

Numerous works (biographies, albums, novels, comics, etc.) are dedicated to Alain Delon, both in France and abroad (Germany, Spain, Greece, Italy, United States, United Kingdom, Russia).

- Henri Rode, The Fascinating Mr. Delon, PAC, 1974.
- Jean-Claude Zana, Alain Delon, Solar, 1981, 64 p. (ISBN 978-2-263-00590-9)
- Henri Rode, Alain Delon, PAC, 1982.
- Olivier Dazat, Alain Delon, Seghers, 1988, 191 p. (ISBN 978-2-232-10126-7)
- Rein A. Zondergeld, Alain Delon – The Ice-Cold Angel. His Films, His Life, Heyne, 1984.
- Rolf Aurich, Alain Delon – Homage, Henschel, 1995.
- Collective, Alain Delon, French Cinematheque, 1996, 106 p. (ISBN 978-2-900596-15-9)
- Emmanuel Haymann, Alain Delon - Splendors and Mysteries of a Superstar, Favre, 1998, 284 p. (ISBN 978-2-8289-0600-9)
- Henry-Jean Servat, Alain Delon the Rebel (1957-1970), Albin Michel, 2000, 100 p. (ISBN 978-2-226-11645-1)
- Bernard Violet, The Delon Mysteries - The Unauthorized Biography, Flammarion, 2000, 562 p. (ISBN 978-2-08-068105-8)
- Henry-Jean Servat, Alain Delon, the Untamed (1970-2001), Albin Michel, 2001, 96 p. (ISBN 978-2-226-12193-6)
- Roberto Chiesi, Alain Delon, Gremese, 2002, 128 p. (ISBN 978-88-7301-498-0)
- Philippe Durant, Alain Delon, Jean-Paul Belmondo: Crossed Destinies, Carnot, 2004.
- Franck Prazan, Alain Delon - My Years in the 50s, Communic'art, 2007.
- Philippe Barbier, Christian Dureau, Delon Romy - They Loved Each Other So Much, Didier Carpentier, 2009.
- Philippe Crocq, Jean Mareska, Alain Delon and Romy Schneider: The Eternal Fiancés, Editions Alphée, 2010.
- Vsevolod Tarasov and Marianna Pozdirka, Alain Delon. A Man for All Seasons, 2010.
- Olivier Rajchman, Delon/Belmondo, Heroes' Fabric, Timée Editions, 2010.
- Christian Dureau, Alain Delon in Full Sun, Didier Carpentier, 2012, 141 p. (ISBN 978-2-84167-769-6)
- Nicole Calfan, Open Letter to Alain Delon, l'Archipel, 2012.
- Ginette Vincendeau, The Perils of Transnational Stardom: Alain Delon in Hollywood Cinema, article for the journal Mise au point, 2014.
- Philippe Durant, Gabin, Ventura, Delon... The Legends of Crime Films, Didier Carpentier, 2014, 256 p. (ISBN 978-2-35584-322-8)
- Kontopoulos Vassilis, Alain Delon, Rue Panos, July 2015, 112 p. (ISBN 9789604771943)
- Patrice Leconte and Guillaume Evin, The Encyclopedia of Alain Delon, Hugo Image, 2016, 216 p. (ISBN 978-2-7556-2495-3)
- Vincent Quivy, Alain Delon, Angel and Rogue, Le Seuil, 2017, 416 p. (ISBN 978-2-02-130357-5, read online).
- Pierre Chédeville, Alain Delon, article for the journal Medium, 2017.
- Nick Rees-Roberts, Darren Waldron, Alain Delon: Style, Stardom, and Masculinity, Bloomsbury Academic USA, 2017.
- Stéphane Guibourgé, Alain Delon's Melancholy, Pierre-Guillaume de Roux, 2017, 219 p. (ISBN 978-2-36371-190-8)
- Stéphane Dolivet, Alain Delon and Me, Les Cygnes, 2018.
- Jean-Marc Parisis, A Problem with Beauty - Delon Through the Eyes, Fayard, 2018, 320 p. (ISBN 978-2-213-69907-3)
- Baptiste Vignol, Alain Delon - A Career, A Myth, GM (Guy Messina), 2019, 144 p. (ISBN 978-2-37797-065-0)
- Jean-Jacques Jelot-Blanc, Alain Delon: His Most Beautiful Movie Images, AKFG Editions, 2019.
- Isabelle Giordano, Alain Delon Film by Film, Gallimard, 2019, 240 p. (ISBN 978-2-7424-5973-5)
- Baptiste Vignol, Alain Delon - The Last Leopard, Gründ, 2020, 240 p. (ISBN 978-2-324-02620-1)
- Christophe Leclerc, Alain Delon - The Actor Who Offers His Soul, L'Harmattan, 2020, 160 p. (ISBN 978-2-343-19414-1)
- Patrick Manchette, I'm Going into Movies (Alain Delon Genesis), Patrick Manchette, 2020.
- Thilo Wydra, A Love in Paris. Romy & Alain, Heyne, 2020.
- Jean-Marc Parisis, A Problem with Beauty - Delon Through the Eyes, Le Livre de Poche, 2021, 272 p. (ISBN 978-2-253-23781-5)
- Alexander Braginsky, Alain Delon Without a Mask, Zebra-E, 2021, 432 p. (ISBN 978-5-907164-93-2)
- Pronchenko Zinaida Sergeevna, Alain Delon, Saint Petersburg, Seans, 2021, 272 p. (ISBN 978-5-6042795-0-2)
- Laurent Galinon, Delon in Chiaroscuro, Mareuil, 2022, 220 p. (ISBN 978-2-37254-265-4)
- Collective, Delon - In Broad and Across, Marabout, 2022, 256 p. (ISBN 978-2-501-17108-3)
- Massimo Moscati, Alain Delon: The Last Divo, Bibliotheka Edizioni, 2022.
- Javier Salvago, The First Who Called Him Alain Delon (Novel), Editorial Renacimiento, 2023, 292 p. (ISBN 978-84-19617-87-3)
- Christiane Brandon, Alain Delon, Our Idol, Our All, Amalthée, 2023, 278 p. (ISBN 978-2-310-05511-6)
- Bernard Pascuito, Delon, a Life on the Alert, L'Archipel, 2024 (29 August 2024), 360 p. (ISBN 978-2-8098-4267-8)
- Denitza Bantcheva and Liliana Rosca, Love and Memories, Marabout, 2022, 208 p. (ISBN 979-10-401-1374-4)
- Peter Bentz, Alain Delon, Bookmundo, 2023.
- Mathew Manuel, Alain Delon: Biography - 25 Unrevealed Facts about Alain Delon, 2024.
- Paul Walter, Alain Delon: The Man and the Legend, 2024.
- Philippe Durant, Alain Delon, a French Destiny, Nouveau Monde, 2024, 884 p. (ISBN 9782334181693).
- Marc Dufaud, Alain Delon, Casa, 2024, 120 p. (ISBN 978-2-38058-562-9)

=== Other books related to Alain Delon ===
- Jacques Rémy, The Fabulous Adventure of Marco Polo, Robert Laffont, 1965, 244 p.
- Collective, Alain Delon's Bugattis, Éditions de l'Amateur, 1988, 86 p. (ISBN 978-2-85917-073-8)
- Paul Giannoli, Great Encounters, Presses de la Cité, 1973.
- Carlo Scaringi, Zorro, Gremese, 1999, 78 p. (ISBN 978-88-7301-355-6)
- Gaia Servadio, Luchino Visconti: A Biography, F. Watts, 1983.
- Jacques Lamalle, This Is Cinema! The Art and Manner of the 7th Art, Les Dossiers du Canard, 1987.
- Collective, Alain Delon's Bugattis, Éditions de l'Amateur, 1988, 86 p. (ISBN 978-2-85917-073-8)
- Renate Seydel, Romy Schneider: Images of My Life, Schirmer-Mosel, 1988.
- Collective, New Wave, L'Avant-Scène Cinéma, 1990, 144 p.
- Yvan Chiffre, In the Shadow of Stars: 30 Years of Action in Cinema, Denoël, 1992.
- Henriette Marello and Sylvie Renoir, The Cinema's Canteen Worker - Belmondo, Delon and Others, Ramsay, 1994, 234 p. (ISBN 978-2-84114-020-6)
- Carlo Scaringi, Zorro, Gremese, 1999.
- Henri Agel, The Handsome Brooder on Screen, L'Harmattan, 2000.
- Dimitra Stavropoulou, Male Movie Stars as Myths and Symbols in Contemporary Society, ANRT, 2000.
- José Giovanni, My Loudmouths - Memoirs, Fayard, 2002.
- Ginette Vincendeau, Jean-Pierre Melville: An American in Paris, BFI, 2003.
- Alain Brassart, The Young Leading Men in French Cinema of the 1960s, Cerf, 2004, 395 p. (ISBN 978-2-204-07489-6)
- Denitza Bantcheva, René Clément, Editions du Revif, 2008.
- Ginette Vincendeau, Stars and the Star System in France, L'Harmattan, 2008, 316 p. (ISBN 978-2-296-06686-1)
- Philippe Durant, Gabin's Gang, Points Virgule, 2011.
- Augustin Burger, Jacques Deray: A Director in Between, Le Bord de l'eau, 2012.
- Diane Arnaud, Changing Faces from Georges Méliès to David Lynch, Rouge Profond, 2012.
- Hohannes Thiele, Romy Schneider, 2012.
- Jean-François Rauger, The Eye That Delights, Yellow Now, 2012.
- Denitza Bantcheva, A Selection of Joseph Losey, Editions du Revif, 2014.
- Michael Hone, French Homosexuality: From Henri III to Alain Delon, 2017.
- Olivier Mongin, Faces of France: Actors as Images of a Nation - A Cinematic Novel, Bayard, 2018.
- Géraldine Danon, Daddy's Girl, Le Cherche midi, 2019.
- Philippe Lombard, The Tough Guys of French Cinema (A Journey Through the Filmography of Gabin, Ventura, Belmondo, and Delon), Hugo Document, 2021.

=== As an author ===
- Alain Delon (author), Philippe Barbier (author), Brigitte Bardot (preface), Delon: The Women of My Life, 2011.

=== Prefaces ===
- Jean Cau, The Candidate, Xenia, 2007.
- Norbert Saada, Mathieu Alterman; preface by Alain Delon, Norbert Saada: A Legendary Producer, Ramsay, 2021.
- Luc Larriba, The Swimming Pool; Foreword by Alain Delon, Huginn & Muninn, 2022.

=== Comic Books ===
Jean-Yves Le Naour and Emmanuel Cassier (illustrator), The Markovic Affair, Bamboo, 2022.

=== Mook (book-magazine) ===
Schnock (no. 37), Alexandre Chabert, La Tengo, distributed by Flammarion, 2020.

== Periodicals ==
Francophone and foreign periodicals on Alain Delon.

Periodicals
- Amis du Film et de la TV, No. 097, mai-juin 1964. Jacques Lombart, Nouveau No. 1 du Cinéma Français et à 28 ans, le plus jeune producteur du monde : Alain Delon
- Amis du Film et de la TV No. 250, mars 1977. Dites-moi Mr Alain Delon (Entretien)
- Avant-Scène Cinéma, No. 041, 1er octobre 1964. A. G. Brunelin, Alain Delon
- Avant-Scène Cinéma, No. 261, 1er février 1981. Alain Delon
- Cahiers de la Cinémathèque, No. 57, octobre 1992. Jean-Paul Gorce, Delon-Tonkin
- Cahiers du Cinéma, No. 501, avril 1996. Jean-François Rauger, Alain Delon, l'unique et son double
- Cahiers du Cinéma, No. 501, avril 1996. Thierry Jousse; Serge Toubiana, Entretien avec Alain Delon
- Ciné Révélation, No. 229, 21 août 1958. Simone Huinh, Alain Delon...
- Ciné-Bulles, vol. 19, No. 4, automne 2001. Michel Coulombe, Le procès Delon
- Cineforum, vol. 49, No. 483, avril 2009. Sergio Arecco, Notti sulla città
- Cinéma 59, No. 35, avril 1959. Jeunes espoirs
- Cinéma 63, No. 78, juillet 1963. Petit lexique des acteurs français d'aujourd'hui
- Cinéma 64, No. 84, mars 1964. Pierre Billard; André G. Brunelin, Delon No. 1 ou la preuve par 4
- Cinéma Français, No. 01, mai 1976. Alain Delon (Entretien)
- Cinéma Français, No. 10, mars 1977. Alain Delon
- Cinéma Français, No. 12, mai 1977. Gros plan : Alain Delon
- Cinéma Français, No. 38, octobre 1980. Producteur, acteur, Alain Delon ou le sens du défi (Entretien)
- Ciné-Magazine, No. 4, février 1977. Dialogues avec Alain Delon (Entretien)
- Cinématographe, No. 050, septembre 1979. Olivier Dazat, Alain Delon : le parcours du combattant
- Cinématographe, No. 103, septembre 1984. Alain Delon (Dossier)
- La Cinématographie Française, No. 2062, mai 1964. Alain Delon 1964-1965
- Cinématographie Française, No. 2069, 13 juin 1964. Guy Allombert, Alain Delon : Avoir des coudées franches (Entretien)
- Cinémonde, No. 1317, 3 novembre 1959. Alain Delon et Romy Schneider
- Cinémonde, No. 1348, 7 juin 1960. Henri Rode, Alain Delon...
- Cinémonde, No. 1435, 6 février 1962. Alain Delon : Je suis comme je suis
- Cinémonde, No. 1545, 17 mars 1964. Pierre Guenin, Opinion publique : Alain Delon a-t-il vraiment la cote d'amour ? (Entretien)
- Cinémonde, No. 1550, 21 avril 1964. Jean Durand, Les grands rivaux du Box-office : Alain Delon - J.-P. Belmondo
- Cinémonde, No. 1566, 11 août 1964. De Romy à Nathalie la corde au cou pour Alain Delon
- Cinémonde, No. 1569, 1er septembre 1964. New-York - Alain et Nathalie : Just Married
- Cinémonde, No. 1604, 4 mai 1965. Henri Rode, Ne tirez pas sur Alain Delon. Une interview exclusive
- Cinémonde, No. 1612, 29 juin 1965. Les confidences exclusives d'Alain Delon (à suivre)
- Cinémonde, No. 1624, 2 novembre 1965. Henri Rode, J'ai 30 ans et je m'en fous (Entretien)
- Cinémonde, No. 1639, 15 février 1966. Tout ce que vous devez savoir sur Alain Delon
- Cinémonde, No. 1654, 3 juin 1966. Une partie de campagne chez les Delon : Quelle joie de vivre
- Cinémonde, No. 1670, 6 décembre 1966. Henri Rode, L'insupportable et dévastateur Monsieur Delon
- Cinémonde, No. 1698, 20 juin 1967. Henri Rode, Alain Delon No. 1 de nos jeunes premiers prend son 2^{e} souffle (à suivre)
- Cinémonde, No. 1745, 14 mai 1968. Alain Delon, un héros de notre temps
- Cinémonde, No. 1828, 24 mars 1970. Face à face Delon-Belmondo (Enbtretien)
- Ciné-Revue, vol. 34, No. 49, 6 décembre 1954. Le bouleversant pardon d'Alain Delon à son fils : Je ne lui en veux pas. J'ai simplement peur pour lui
- Ciné-Revue, vol. 38, No. 52, 26 décembre 1958. Robert Chazal, Alain Delon...
- Ciné-Revue, vol. 39, No. 33, 14 aoput 1959. Jean Vietti, Quatre mousquetaires en vogue...
- Ciné-Revue, vol. 41, No. 08, 24 février 1961. Jean Vietti, Alain Delon... La vérité sur Romy et moi
- Ciné-Revue, vol. 42, No. 45, 1er novembre 1962. Alain Delon biofilmographie
- Ciné-Revue, vol. 44, No. 46, 12 novembre 1964. A Hollywood Alain Delon affirme : J'ai tourné une page de ma vie (Entretien)
- Ciné-Revue, vol. 45, No. 13, 25 mars 1965. Que se passe-t-il exactement pour Alain Delon à Hollywood ?
- Ciné-Revue, vol. 45, No. 49, 2 décembre 1965. Alain Delon... mais lui, il a complètement oublié Romy
- Ciné-Revue, vol. 46, No. 13, 31 mars 1966. Alain Delon : il joue actuellement le tout pour le tout
- Ciné-Revue, vol. 47, No. 37, 14 septembre 1967. Alain Delon
- Ciné-Revue, vol. 49, No. 31, 31 juillet 1969. Jacques Baroche, Alain Delon... (Entretien)
- Ciné-Revue, vol. 50, No. 25, 18 juin 1970. Alain Delon et le cinéma français en 1970
- Ciné-Revue, vol. 51, No. 27, 8 juillet 1971. Jacques Baroche, Alain Delon règle ses comptes avec les compétences du cinéma français
- Ciné-Revue, vol. 51, No. 48, 2 décembre 1971. Alain Delon : On m'en veut parce que j'ai de l'argent et des filles...
- Ciné-Revue, vol. 52, No. 32, 10 août 1972. David Dugas, L'émouvant cri du coeur d'un homme pour lequel seule compte la tendresse...
- Ciné-Revue, vol. 52, No. 47, 23 novembre 1972. Alain Delon
- Ciné-Revue, vol. 53, No. 19, 10 mai 1973. Alain Delon jette le masque ! (Entretien)
- Ciné-Revue, vol. 54, No. 04, 24 janvier 1974. La violence est-elle plus nocive que la pornographie ?
- Ciné-Revue, vol. 54, No. 19, 9 mai 1974. Le merveilleux roman d'amour du couple No. 1 du cinéma français : Alain Delon - Mireille Darc (Entretien)
- Ciné-Revue, vol. 55, No. 01, janvier 1975. Des supermarchés pour Alain Delon (Entretien)
- Ciné-Revue, vol. 55, No. 49, 4 décembre 1975. Alain Delon : Je n'aime pas les femmes qui disent tout de suite OUI (Entretien)
- Ciné-Revue vol. 56, No. 41, 7 octobre 1976. J. V. Cottom, La prodigieuse carrière d'Alain Delon, le No. 1 du cinéma français
- Ciné-Revue vol. 57, No. 16, 21 avril 1977. Alain Duroy, Alain Delon, Jean-Paul Belmondo : salut l'artiste !
- Ciné-Revue, vol. 57, No. 49, 8 décembre 1977. Alain Delon : Le jour où je ne serai plus le numéro un, on aura le droit de me cracher à la g... (Entretien)
- Ciné-Revue, vol. 58, No. 19, 11 mai 1978. Roger Houze, Alain Delon : Je suis une star, je suis heureux de l'être (Entretien)
- Ciné-Revue, vol. 59, No. 03, 18 janvier 1979. Alain Delon dit tout sur sa vie et sur ses ambitions (Entretien)
- Ciné-Revue, vol. 59, No. 42, 18 octobre 1979. Alain Delon : La France est colonisée par le cinéma américain (Entretien)
- Ciné-Revue, vol. 60, No. 41, 9 octobre 1980. Alain Delon tel qu'il est ! Les confidences de la partenaire D. DI Lazzaro
- Ciné-Revue, vol. 61, No. 35, 27 août 1981. Alain Delon : Je n'ai pas peur de le dire : j'ai réussi ma vie (Entretien)
- Ciné-Revue, vol. 62, No. 04, 21 janvier 1982. Catherine Deneuve - Alain Delon : le couple choc !
- Ciné-Revue, vol. 62, No. 41, 7 octobre 1982. Alain Delon : la passion du défi
- Ciné-Revue, vol. 62, No. 46, 11 novembre 1982. Le merveilleux cadeau d'Alain Delon à nos lecteurs
- Ciné-Revue, vol. 63, No. 04, 27 janvier 1983. Alain Delon révèle ses fabuleux secrets de star ! (Entretien)
- Ciné-Revue, vol. 63, No. 22, 2 juin 1983. Gérard Néves, La vérité sur la deuxième vie d'Alain Delon
- Ciné-Revue, vol. 64, No. 02, 12 janvier 1984. Gérard Néves, Alain Delon : ce qui n'a jamais été dit !
- Ciné-Revue, vol. 64, No. 16, 19 avril 1984. Dalila Di Lazzaro : elle a découvert le séducteur Delon qu'on ne connait pas...
- Ciné-Revue, vol. 64, No. 36, 6 septembre 1984. Gérard Néves, Alain Delon : le mystère de son départ à Hollywood !
- Ciné-Revue, vol. 64, No. 48, 29 novembre 1984. Alain Delon
- Ciné-Revue, vol. 65, No. 19, 9 mai 1985. Paul Emmanuel, Alain Delon, l'autre visage d'une star !
- Ciné-Revue, vol. 65, No. 24, 13 juin 1985. Gérard Néves, Alain Delon, la star de tous les défis !
- Ciné-Revue, vol. 65, No. 31, 1er août 1985. Gérard Néves, Les quatre vérités d'Alain Delon ! Interview exclusive
- Ciné-Revue, vol. 65, No. 36, 5 septembre 1985. Vive le roi Delon !
- Ciné-Revue, vol. 66, No. 15, 10 avril 1986. Alain Delon : superforme pour une superstar !
- Ciné-Revue, vol. 66, No. 19, 8 mai 1986. Gérard Néves, Alain Delon : une superbe preuve d'amour au cinéma !
- Ciné-Revue, vol. 66, No. 23, 5 juin 1986. Henry Chapier, Le Sacre d'Alain Delon !
- Ciné-Revue, vol. 66, No. 48, 26 novembre 1987. Alain Duroy, Alain Delon à la conquête de la Chine
- Ciné-Revue, vol. 67, No. 20, 14 mai 1987. Gérard Néves, Le nouvel Alain Delon : la folie du bonheur et la force de la sagesse
- Ciné-Revue, vol. 68, No. 06, 11 février 1988. Alain Delon tourne Cinéma
- Ciné-Revue, vol. 68, No. 40, 6 octobre 1988. Gérard Néves, Télévision et cinéma : le double événement Alain Delon !
- Ciné-Revue, vol. 69, No. 10, 9 mars 1989. Delon-Godard : une affiche d'exception !
- Ciné-Revue, vol. 69, No. 40, 5 octobre 1989. Alain Delon : et si on parlait métier, amour et amitié (Entretien)
- Ciné-Revue, vol. 70, No. 41, 11 octobre 1990. Marc Deriez, Alain Delon : un nouveau défi
- Ciné-Revue, vol. 70, No. 46, 15 novembre 1990. Alain Delon : des sensations fortes au Japon
- Ciné-Revue, vol. 70, No. 51, 20 décembre 1990. Marc Deriez, Alain Delon, papa d'une petite fille : pourquoi nous vous disons la vérité
- Ciné-Revue, vol. 71, No. 18, 2 mai 1991. Bernard Ales, Alain Delon : le choc de sa confession
- Ecran, No. 65, janvier 1978. Alain Delon
- Film Complet, No. 678, 17 juillet 1958. Alain Delon ou le visage de la chance
- Le Film Français, No. 1064, 23 octobre 1964. Box-office d'Alain Delon 1958-1964
- Le Film Français, No. 1440, 12 mai 1972. Box-office d'Alain Delon 1967-1972
- Le Film Français, No. 1482, 13 avril 1973. Box-office d'Alain Delon 1969-1973
- Le Film Français No. 1665, 18 février 1977. Le box-office d'Alain Delon
- Le Film Français, No. 1889, 12 février 1982. Référé d'Alain Delon contre les Editions Solar
- Le Film Français, No. 2026, mars 1985. Alain Delon
- Le Film Français, No. 2092, Arts et Lettres : Lang décore Delon
- Le Film Français, No. 2232, 10 février 1989. Alain Delon inaugure le festival
- Le Film Français, No. 2467, 13 août 1993. Alain Delon : le dérapage. Box-office Alain Delon 1980-1983
- Le Film Français, No. 2555, 21 avril 1995. Le Festival de Cognac acclame Alain Delon
- Le Film Français, No. 2823, 14 avril 2000. Jean-Michel Cedro, Delon, Belmondo, Berry jouent pour TF1
- Jeunesse Cinéma, No. 44, juillet 1961. Alain Delon se confie à vous (à suivre)
- Jeunesse Cinéma, No. 45, août 1961. Les confidences d'Alain Delon
- Jeunesse Cinéma, No. 90, juin 1965. Monsieur Delon U.S.A.
- Lumière du Cinéma, No. 3, janvier 1981. Puzzle pour Alain Delon
- Lumière du Cinéma, No. 5, juin 1977. Alain Delon
- Mon Film, No. 616, 11 juin 1958. Claude Janel, Alain Delon (Entretien)
- Mon Film, No. 724, mai 1964. Portraits de Vedettes
- Positif, No. 300, février 1986. Préférences
- Positif, No. 533-534, juillet-août 2005. Fabien Gaffez, L'île Brando
- Positif, No. 583, septembre 2009. Alain Delon, Témoignage sur Losey
- Première, No. 003, 1977. Delon par Delon (Entretien)
- Première, No. 008, août 1977. Gros plan sur Delon au Japon
- Première, No. 012, décembre 1977. Au rendez-vous de Michel Drucker : Alain Delon (Entretien)
- Première, No. 032, octobre 1979. L'interview de Première : Alain Delon
- Première, No. 054, septembre 1981. Delon : autopsie d'une star
- Première, No. 101, août 1985. Le blanc et le noir. Une interview d'Alain Delon
- La Revue du Cinéma /Image et Son, No. 396, juillet-août 1984. Yves Alion, Alain Delon, l'homme de Cro-Magnon
- La Revue du Cinéma /Image et Son, No. 460, mai 1990. Yves Alion, Alain Delon : le flic et le paumé
- La Revue du Cinéma /Image et Son, No. 460, mai 1990. Yves Alion, Delon brûle-t-il ?
- Talents, No. 1, 15 avril 1988. J'ai tout de suite été séduit par Cinéma... (Entretien)
- Technicien du Film, No. 218, 15 septembre 1974. Alain Delon : vice-président d'Unifrance Film
- Télé-Ciné-Vidéo, No. 56, novembre 1985. Pascal Merigeau, Le combat des chefs : Belmondo / Delon
- Unifrance Film - Informations, No. 46, mars 1958. Alain Delon
- Unifrance Film, No. 5, 1981. Alain Delon (Entretien)
- Visions, No. 39, mai 1986. Delon en Lang
- Voir, No. 1, mars 1984. Delon-Belmondo : le coq et le scorpion
