= Nick Rees-Roberts =

British author and academic

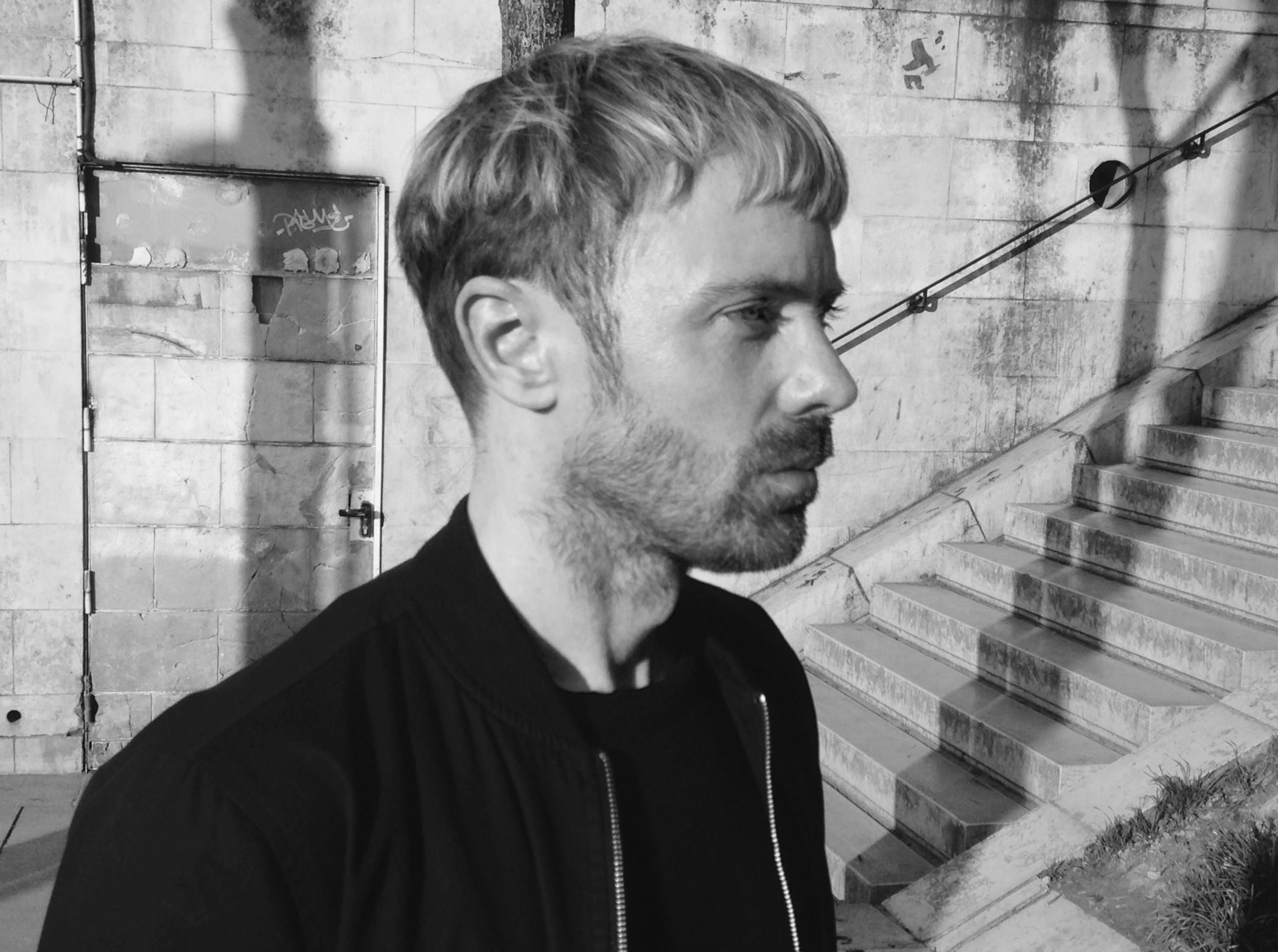
Nick Rees-Roberts

Nick Rees-Roberts (born 1975) is a British-born author and French academic. He is Professor of Media, Culture and Communication at the Sorbonne Nouvelle University Paris, France.

His research focuses on forms of visual representation in contemporary media culture and the creative industries, in particular fashion and film.

His monographs to date, French Queer Cinema, Fashion Film and Failure, all map new fields of critical inquiry. French Queer Cinema offered a comprehensive overview of LGBT and New Queer Cinema in France and was described as a "highly rewarding study that conveys genuine optimism about the current and future state of French gay/queer film. Fashion Film was praised for being "intellectually rigorous", "extremely intelligent, well researched and beautifully written". In Failure Rees-Roberts describes how fashion thrives on fame and success, capitalism and culture. The book argues that beneath the luster and hype, fashion is also inevitably about failure – an essential part of its history and evolution. Positing failure as a speculative way to rethink fashion, the author explores how forms of commercial failure within a capitalist framework might actually be productive.

== Biography ==
Rees-Roberts grew up in Hertfordshire on the outskirts of London and was educated at St George's School, Harpenden. He read Modern Languages at Keble College, University of Oxford and completed a PhD in Media and Cultural Studies at the University of Sussex under the supervision of Professor Alan Sinfield. Between 2007 and 2016 he lectured in French Film Studies at the University of Bristol. In 2016, he was appointed Full Professor at the Sorbonne Nouvelle University, where he teaches in the Faculty of Arts and Media and is a member of the IRMECCEN research institute (Institut de recherche en Médias, Culture, Communication et Numérique). He is director of the Masters programme in Fashion and Creative Industries, in partnership with the École Duperré and L'Institut des Métiers d’Excellence LVMH (IME).

== Research ==
Rees-Roberts' research focuses on contemporary media culture in the intersecting fields of fashion, film, gender, and queer studies. He is the author of French Queer Cinema, published by Edinburgh University Press in 2008. The book examines the representation of queer identities and sexualities in contemporary French filmmaking. This volume was the first comprehensive study of the cultural formation and critical reception of contemporary queer film and video in France, drawing attention to issues of race and migration, the topic of his second book, Homo exoticus : race, classe et critique queer, co-written with French academic, Maxime Cervulle and published in 2010. His subsequent work has focused on fashion design and on film stars including volumes on Alain Delon and Isabelle Huppert. His book Fashion Film: Art and Advertising in the Digital Age, published by Bloomsbury Visual Arts in 2018, examines the role of moving image in the promotion, communication, and spectacle of contemporary fashion. In Failure (published in 2026 as part of the Fashion in Action series) Rees-Roberts unravels the relationship between forms of creative and commercial failure to consider how we might begin to address the systemic failings of the fashion industry today.

== Books ==
- French Queer Cinema (Edinburgh: Edinburgh University Press, 2008/2014)
- Homo exoticus : race, classe et critique queer, co-authored by Maxime Cervulle (Paris: Armand Colin, 2010)
- Alain Delon: Style, Stardom, and Masculinity, co-edited by Darren Waldron (New York: Bloomsbury Academic, 2015)
- Fashion Film: Art and Advertising in the Digital Age (London: Bloomsbury Visual Arts, 2018)
- Isabelle Huppert: Stardom, Performance, Authorship, co-edited by Darren Waldron (New York: Bloomsbury Academic, 2021)
- Failure (Fashion in Action) (London: Bloomsbury Visual Arts, 2026)
- The Elizabeth Wilson Reader: Feminism, Fashion and the Aesthetics of Modern Life, co-edited by Christopher Breward (London: Bloomsbury Visual Arts, 2027)
