= Robert Chazal =

French film critique (1912–2002)

- Born: 3 September 1912; Saint-Nom-la-Bretèche
- Died: 12 April 2002 (aged 89)
- Occupation: Film critique

Robert Chazal (3 September 1912 – 12 April 2002), was a French film critique. He was chief editor of the magazine Cinémonde, and worked also for Paris-Presse, France-Soir and Le Journal du Dimanche. He was a member of the jury at the 1981 Cannes Film Festival.

== Theatre (co adaptator) ==
- 1994: La Nuit du crime after Steve Passeur, adaptation Jean Serge, Robert Chazal and Robert Hossein, Théâtre de Paris

== Publications ==
- Louis de Funès, Paris, Éditions Denoël, collection Étoiles, 1972
