= Le Film français =

French weekly magazine

- Editor: Sophie Dacbert
- Categories: Film
- Frequency: Weekly
- Founded: 1944
- Country: France
- Based in: Paris
- Website: Le Film français

Le Film français (The French Film) is a weekly French film magazine that was founded in 1944 by Jean-Bernard and Jean-Placide Derosne Mauclaire. The magazine is headquartered in Paris. In the 1980s it was described as similar to American magazine Variety. Annually since 1994, the magazine has awarded the Trophées du Film français (French Film Trophies), which honour the best in film of every year.

== See also ==
- List of film periodicals
