= Belmondo =

Belmondo is a surname. Notable people with the surname include:

- Jean-Paul Belmondo (1933–2021), French actor
  - His son (born 1963), Paul Belmondo (racing driver), a racing driver
  - His father (1898-1982), Paul Belmondo (sculptor)
  - His grandson (born 1993), Victor Belmondo, an actor
- Stefania Belmondo (born 1969), Italian cross-country skier
- Stéphane Belmondo (born 1967), French musician
- Vittorio Belmondo (fl. 1930s), Italian racing driver
