= Cinémonde =

French film magazine (1928–1971)

- Former editors: Suzanne Chantal
- Categories: Film magazine
- Frequency: Weekly
- Founded: 1928
- Final issue: 1971
- Country: France
- Based in: Paris
- Language: French
- ISSN: 1153-690X

Cinémonde was a weekly popular film magazine which existed between 1928 and 1971 with six-year interruption due to its ban during the Nazi occupation of France. It was one of the best-selling magazines in its category particularly in the 1950s.

== History and profile ==
Cinémonde was launched in 1928. It came out weekly. In 1940 the magazine was closed by the Nazi forces after the occupation of France. Cinémonde was restarted in March 1946 and published until 1971. In the 1930s one of its editors-in-chief was Suzanne Chantal who was a women's right activist. Its target audience was women who were from the lower-middle and middle classes.

Being part of the second generation film magazines in France Cinémonde did not regard the cinema and movies as an art. Instead, it focused on news about movie stars and news from film studies. From 1956 the magazine frequently featured articles about the French actress Brigitte Bardot. In addition, its main content was the translation and adaptations of the articles published in American film magazines.

In the 1950s Cinémonde enjoyed the highest level of circulation selling nearly 250,000 copies.
