= List of Alain Delon performances =

Alain Delon performances
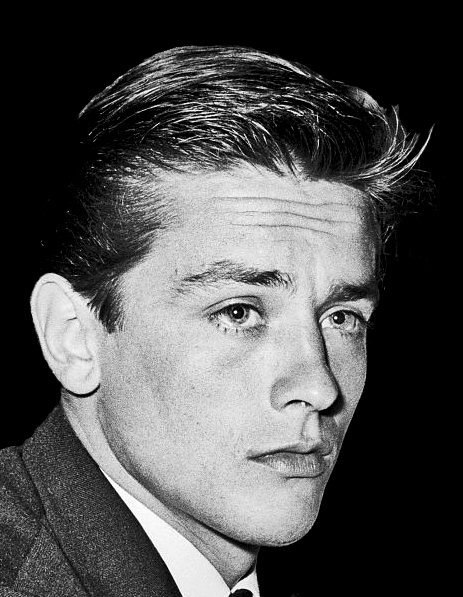
- Alain Delon in 1961
- Film: 88
- Television film: 4
- Television series: 3
- Theatre: 7
- Directing: 3

Alain Delon (1935–2024) was a French actor. He is known as one of Europe's most prominent actors and screen sex symbols from the 1960s, 1970s and 1980s.

Over the course of his career, Delon has starred in over 90 films in a variety of roles and genres. He achieved critical acclaim for his performance in films such as Purple Noon (1960), Rocco and His Brothers (1960), L'Eclisse (1962), The Leopard (1963), Le Samouraï (1967), and La Piscine (1969). He later cultivated an image as a "tough guy" with appearances in crime dramas such as The Sicilian Clan (1969), Borsalino (1970), Le Cercle Rouge (1970), Un flic (1972) and Borsalino & Co. (1974). His films, combined, have been seen in cinemas by over 135 million spectators. Delon worked with many well-known directors over his career, including Luchino Visconti, Jean-Luc Godard, Jean-Pierre Melville, Michelangelo Antonioni, and Louis Malle. He also appeared in nine films directed by Jacques Deray, including La Piscine (1969). As a theatre actor, Delon has performed in six different plays. As a singer, Delon has recorded seven songs, and one as a featured artist.

Delon is the credited film director for two films: Pour la peau d'un flic (1981) and Le battant (1983). Delon has also produced many films, primarily through his production company, Adel Productions, which he founded in 1968.

== Film ==
Film credits of Alain Delon
| Year | Title | Role | Director | Notes | Ref. |
|---|---|---|---|---|---|
| 1949 | Le rapt | Gangster | Olivier Bourguignon | Short film | |
| 1957 | Send a Woman When the Devil Fails (French: Quand la femme s'en mêle) | Jo | Yves Allégret | Feature debut | |
| 1957 | Be Beautiful But Shut Up (French: Sois belle et tais-toi) | Loulou | Marc Allégret | | |
| 1958 | Christine | Franz Lobheiner | Pierre Gaspard-Huit | | |
| 1959 | Women Are Weak (French: Faibles Femmes) | Julien Fenal | Michel Boisrond | | |
| 1959 | Way of Youth (French: Le Chemin des écoliers) | Antoine Michaud | Michel Boisrond | | |
| 1960 | Purple Noon (French: Plein soleil) | Tom Ripley | René Clément | | |
| 1960 | Rocco and His Brothers (Italian: Rocco e i suoi fratelli) | Rocco Parondi | Luchino Visconti | | |
| 1961 | The Joy of Living (French: Quelle joie de vivre) | Ulysse Cecconato | René Clément | | |
| 1961 | Famous Love Affairs (French: Les Amours célèbres) | Albert III, Duke of Bavaria | Michel Boisrond | | |
| 1962 | L'Eclisse | Piero | Michelangelo Antonioni | | |
| 1962 | Redhead (German: Die Rote) | A passenger in Venice | Helmut Käutner | Uncredited | |
| 1962 | The Devil and the Ten Commandments (French: Le Diable et les Dix Commandements) | Pierre Messager | Julien Duvivier | | |
| 1963 | The Leopard (Italian: Il gattopardo) | Prince Tancredi Falconeri | Luchino Visconti | | |
| 1963 | Any Number Can Win (French: Mélodie en sous-sol) | Francis Verlot | Henri Verneuil | | |
| 1963 | Carom Shots (French: Carambolages) | Monsieur Lambert | Marcel Bluwal | Uncredited | |
| 1964 | The Black Tulip (French: La Tulipe noire) | Guillaume de Saint Preux / Julien de Saint Preux / The Black Tulip | Christian-Jaque | | |
| 1964 | Joy House (French: Les Félins) | Marc | René Clément | | |
| 1964 | The Unvanquished (French: L'Insoumis) | Thomas Vlassenroot | Alain Cavalier | Also uncredited producer | |
| 1964 | The Yellow Rolls-Royce | Stefano | Anthony Asquith | British debut | |
| 1964 | Le journal d'un combat | —N/a | Guy Gilles | Short film; producer | |
| 1965 | Once a Thief (French: Les Tueurs de San Francisco) | Eddie Pedak | Ralph Nelson | Hollywood debut | |
| 1965 | Love at Sea (French: L'amour à la mer) | Film actor | Guy Gilles | | |
| 1966 | Lost Command | Captain Philippe Esclavier | Mark Robson | | |
| 1966 | Texas Across the River | Don Andrea Baldazar | Michael Gordon | | |
| 1966 | Is Paris Burning? (French: Paris brûle-t-il ?) | Jacques Chaban-Delmas | René Clément | | |
| 1967 | The Last Adventure (French: Les Aventuriers) | Manu Borelli | Robert Enrico | | |
| 1967 | Le Samouraï | Jef Costello | Jean-Pierre Melville | | |
| 1967 | Diabolically Yours (French: Diaboliquement vôtre) | Pierre Lagrange / Georges Campo | Julien Duvivier | | |
| 1968 | Spirits of the Dead (French: Histoires extraordinaires) | William Wilson | Louis Malle | Segment: "William Wilson" | |
| 1968 | The Girl on a Motorcycle (French: La motocyclette) | Daniel | Jack Cardiff | Also uncredited producer | |
| 1968 | Farewell, Friend (French: Adieu l'ami) | Dino Barran | Jean Vautrin | | |
| 1968 | Ho! | Man at airport | Robert Enrico | Uncredited | |
| 1969 | The Swimming Pool (French: La Piscine) | Jean-Paul Leroy | Jacques Deray | | |
| 1969 | Jeff | Laurent | Jean Vautrin | Also producer | |
| 1969 | The Sicilian Clan (French: Le clan des Siciliens) | Roger Sartet | Henri Verneuil | | |
| 1970 | Borsalino | Roch Siffredi | Jacques Deray | Also producer | |
| 1970 | Sortie de secours | —N/a | Roger Kahane | Producer | |
| 1970 | Le Cercle Rouge | Corey | Jean-Pierre Melville | | |
| 1970 | The Love Mates (French: Madly) | Julien Dandieu | Roger Kahane | Also producer | |
| 1971 | Fantasia Among the Squares (French: Fantasia chez les ploucs) | A caïd | Gérard Pirès | Uncredited | |
| 1971 | Easy, Down There! (French: Doucement les basses) | Simon Médieu | Jacques Deray | Also producer | |
| 1971 | La planète des hommes | —N/a | Bob Elia and Jean-Marie Périer | Short film; producer | |
| 1971 | Red Sun (French: Soleil rouge) | Gauche | Terence Young | | |
| 1971 | The Widow Couderc (French: La Veuve Couderc) | Jean Lavigne | Pierre Granier-Deferre | | |
| 1972 | Il était une fois un flic | Man who rings the doorbell | Georges Lautner | Uncredited | |
| 1972 | The Assassination of Trotsky (French: L'assassinat de Trotsky) | Frank Jacson | Joseph Losey | | |
| 1972 | Indian Summer (Italian: La prima notte di quiete) | Daniele Dominici | Valerio Zurlini | Also producer | |
| 1972 | A Cop (French: Un flic) | Commissaire Édouard Coleman | Jean-Pierre Melville | | |
| 1973 | Shock Treatment (French: Traitement de choc) | Doctor Devilers | Alain Jessua | | |
| 1973 | Scorpio | Jean Laurier / Scorpio | Michael Winner | | |
| 1973 | The Burned Barns (French: Les granges brûlées) | Judge Pierre Larcher | Jean Chapot | | |
| 1973 | No Way Out (French: Tony Arzenta) | Tony Arzenta | Duccio Tessari | Also uncredited producer | |
| 1973 | Two Men in Town (French: Deux hommes dans la ville) | Gino Strabliggi | José Giovanni | Also producer | |
| 1974 | Creezy (French: La race des seigneurs) | Julien Dandieu | Pierre Granier-Deferre | | |
| 1974 | Icy Breasts (French: Les seins de glace) | Marc Rilson | Georges Lautner | Also producer | |
| 1974 | Borsalino & Co. | Roch Siffredi | Jacques Deray | Also producer | |
| 1975 | Zorro | Don Diego de la Vega / Zorro | Duccio Tessari | | |
| 1975 | Flic Story | Roger Borniche | Jacques Deray | Also producer | |
| 1975 | The Gypsy (French: Le Gitan) | Hugo Sennart | José Giovanni | Also producer | |
| 1976 | Mr. Klein (French: Monsieur Klein) | Robert Klein | Joseph Losey | Also producer | |
| 1976 | Boomerang (French: Comme un boomerang) | Jacques Batkin | José Giovanni | Also producer and writer | |
| 1977 | The Gang (French: Le Gang) | Robert "Le dingue" | Jacques Deray | Also producer | |
| 1977 | Armaguedon | Doctor Michel Ambroise | Alain Jessua | Also producer | |
| 1977 | Man in a Hurry (French: L'homme pressé) | Pierre Niox | Édouard Molinaro | Also producer | |
| 1977 | Death of a Corrupt Man (French: Mort d'un pourri) | Xavier "Xav" Maréchal | Georges Lautner | Also producer | |
| 1978 | Attention, the Kids Are Watching (French: Attention, les enfants regardent) | "The Man" | Serge Leroy | Also producer | |
| 1978 | Power Play (French: Le Jeu de la puissance) | —N/a | Martyn Burke | Producer | |
| 1979 | The Concorde... Airport '79 | Captain Paul Metrand | David Lowell Rich | Final Hollywood and English-language film | |
| 1979 | The Medic (French: Le toubib) | Jean-Marie Desprée | Pierre Granier-Deferre | Also producer | |
| 1980 | Three Men to Kill (French: Trois hommes à abattre) | Michel Gerfaut | Jacques Deray | Also producer and writer | |
| 1980 | Teheran 43 (French: Téhéran 43 - Nid d'espions) | Inspector Georges Foche | Aleksandr Alov and Vladimir Naumov | | |
| 1981 | For a Cop's Hide (French: Pour la peau d'un flic) | Choucas | Alain Delon | Also director, producer and writer | |
| 1982 | Le Choc | Martin Terrier / Christian | Robin Davis | Also writer and uncredited co-director | |
| 1983 | The Fighter (French: Le Battant) | Jacques Darnay | Alain Delon | Also director, producer and writer | |
| 1983 | Le jeune marié | —N/a | Bernard Stora | Producer | |
| 1984 | Swann in Love (French: Un amour de Swann) | Palamède de Guermantes, Baron de Charlus | Volker Schlöndorff | | |
| 1984 | Our Story (French: Notre histoire) | Robert Avranches | Bertrand Blier | Also producer | |
| 1985 | Cop's Honour (French: Parole de flic) | Daniel Pratt | José Pinheiro | Also producer and writer | |
| 1986 | The Passage (French: Le passage) | Jean Diaz | René Manzor | Also producer and writer | |
| 1986 | Les pros | —N/a | Florence Moncorgé-Gabin | Short film; producer | |
| 1988 | Let Sleeping Cops Lie (French: Ne réveillez pas un flic qui dort) | Commissaire Eugène Grindel | José Pinheiro | Also producer and writer | |
| 1990 | New Wave (French: Nouvelle Vague) | Lui / Roger Lennox / Richard Lennox | Jean-Luc Godard | | |
| 1990 | Dancing Machine | Alan Wolf | Gilles Béhat | Also producer and writer | |
| 1992 | The Return of Casanova (French: Le retour de Casanova) | Giacomo Casanova | Édouard Niermans | Also producer | |
| 1993 | A Crime (French: Un crime) | Maître Charles Dunand | Jacques Deray | Also producer and writer | |
| 1994 | The Teddy Bear (French: L'ours en peluche) | Jean Rivière | Jacques Deray | | |
| 1995 | One Hundred and One Nights (French: Les cent et une nuits de Simon Cinéma) | Himself | Agnès Varda | | |
| 1997 | Day and Night (French: Le jour et la nuit) | Alexandre | Bernard-Henri Lévy | | |
| 1998 | Half a Chance (French: Une chance sur deux) | Julien Vignal | Patrice Leconte | | |
| 2000 | Actors (French: Les acteurs) | Himself | Bertrand Blier | | |
| 2008 | Asterix at the Olympic Games (French: Astérix aux Jeux olympiques) | Julius Caesar | Frédéric Forestier and Thomas Langmann | Final acting role (non-self) | |
| 2012 | Happy New Year, Moms! (Russian: С новым годом, мамы!) | Himself | Sarik Andreasyan | | |
| 2019 | Disclaimer (French: Toute ressemblance...) | Himself | Michel Denisot | | |

=== Unfinished films ===
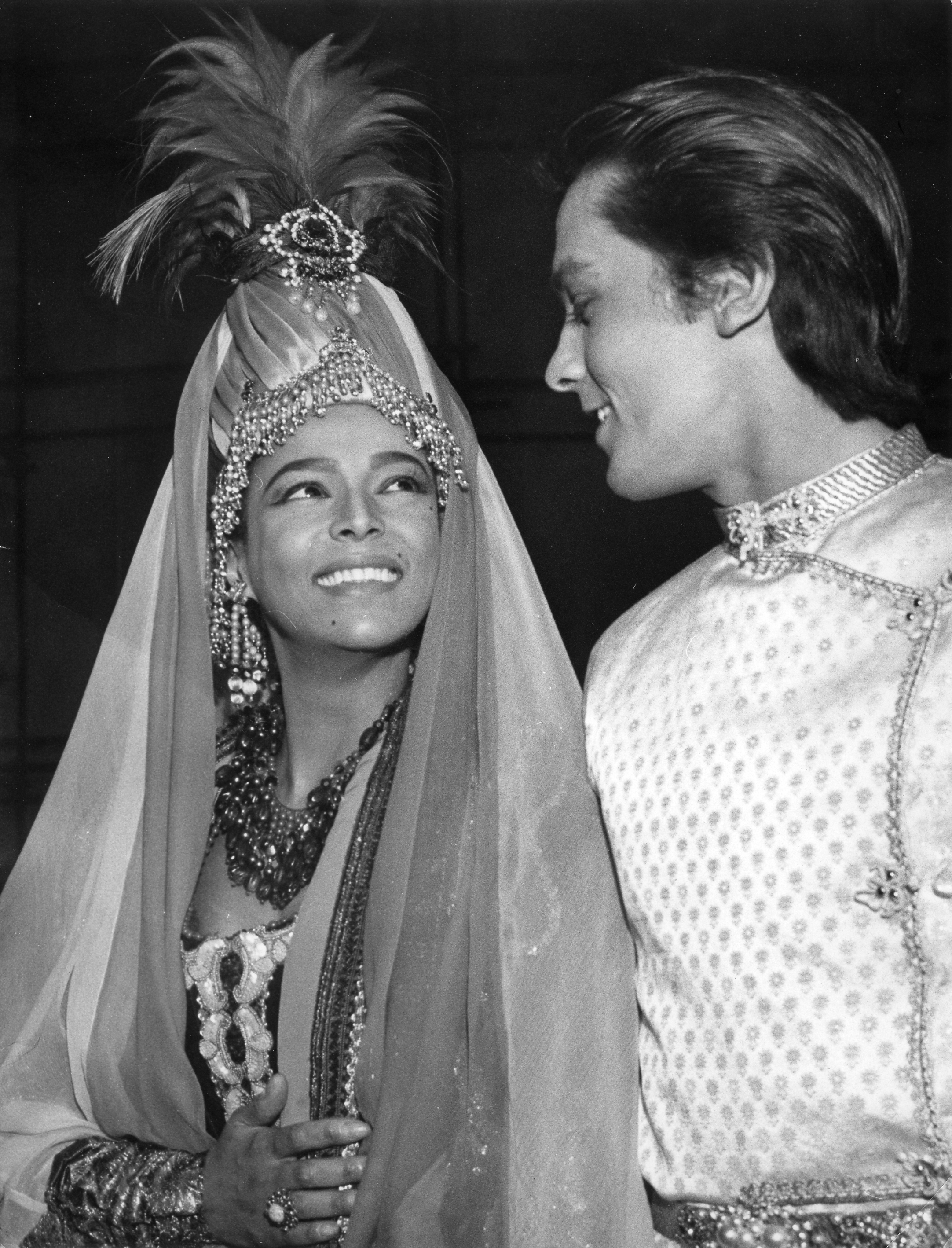
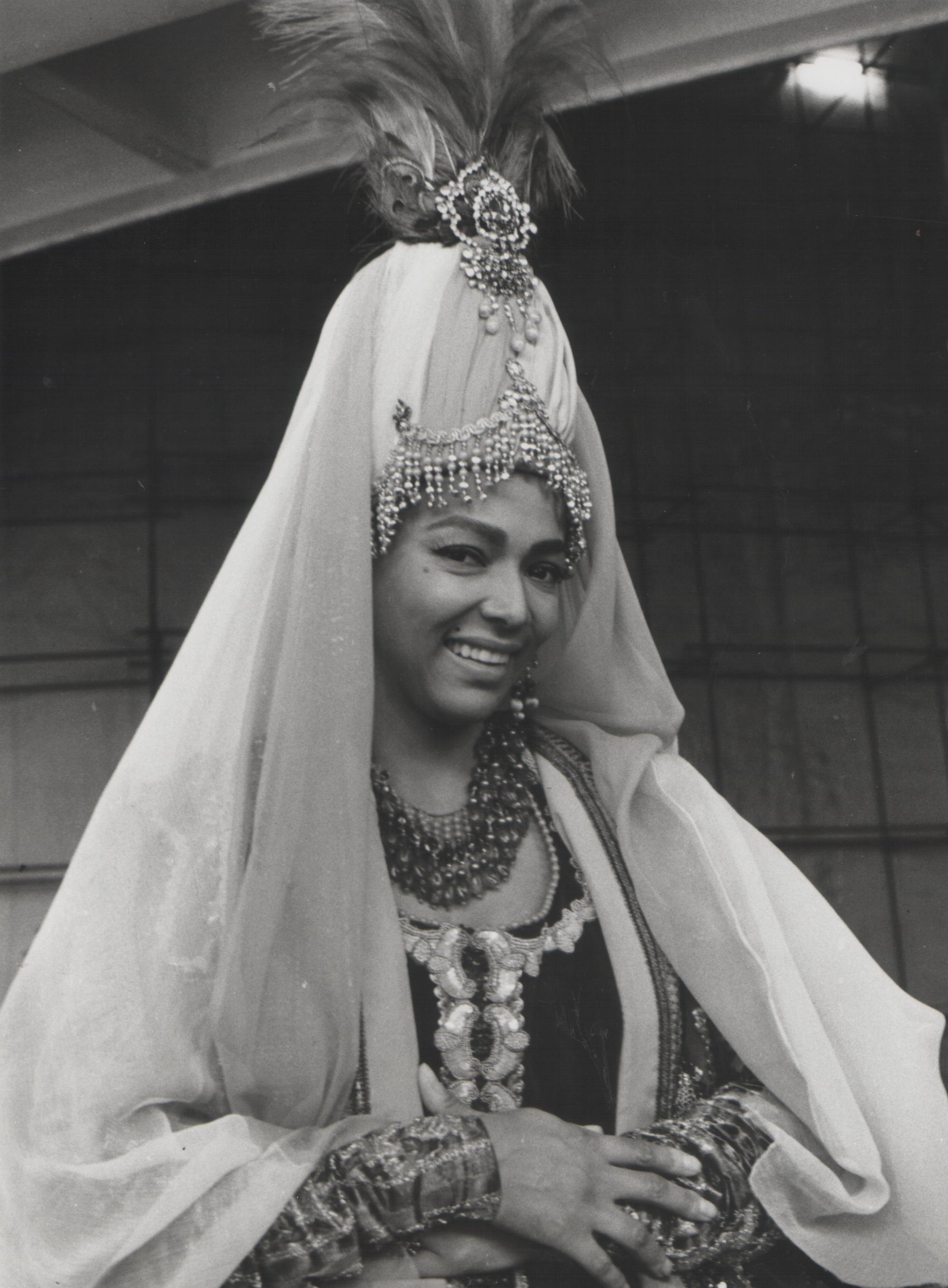
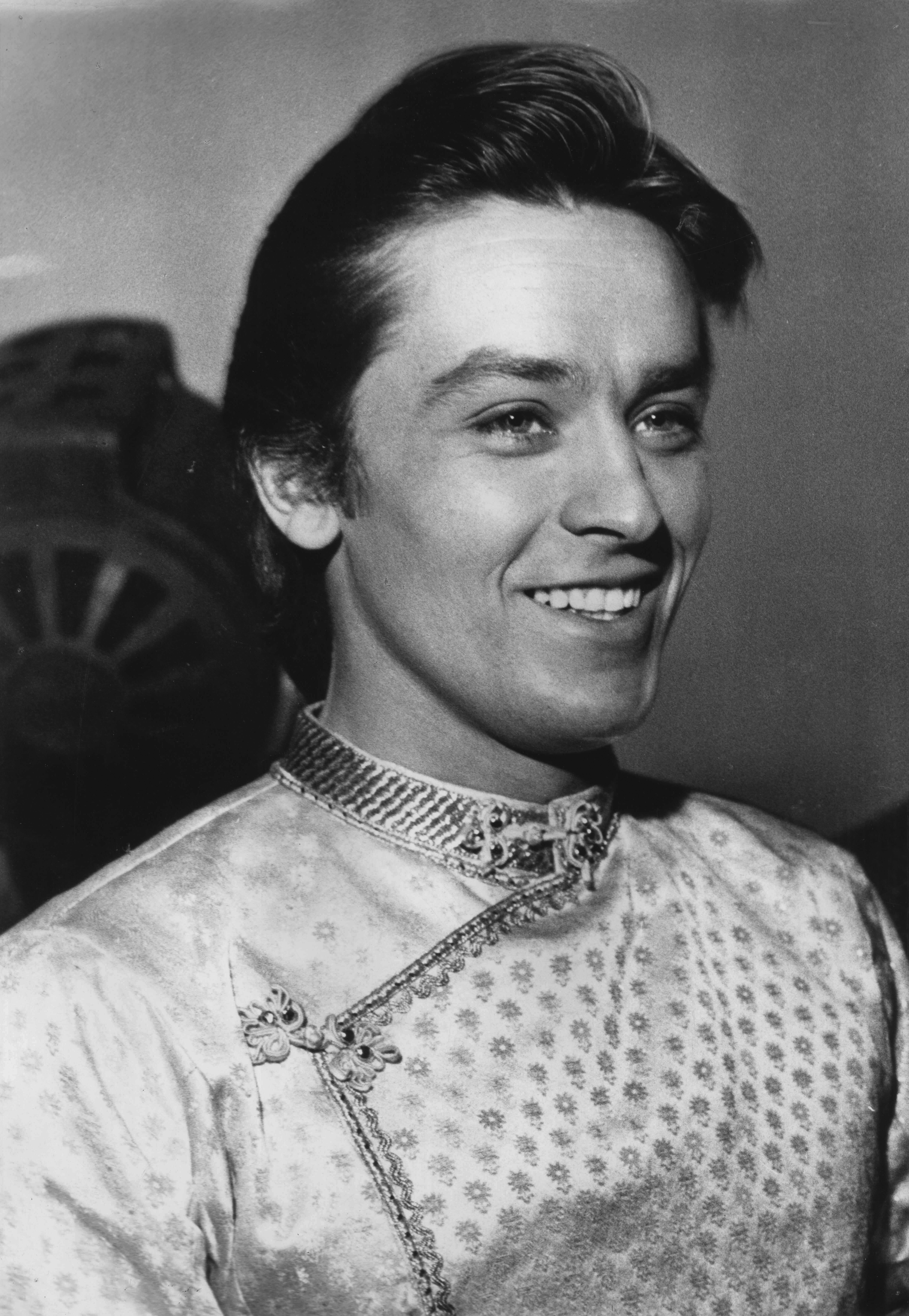
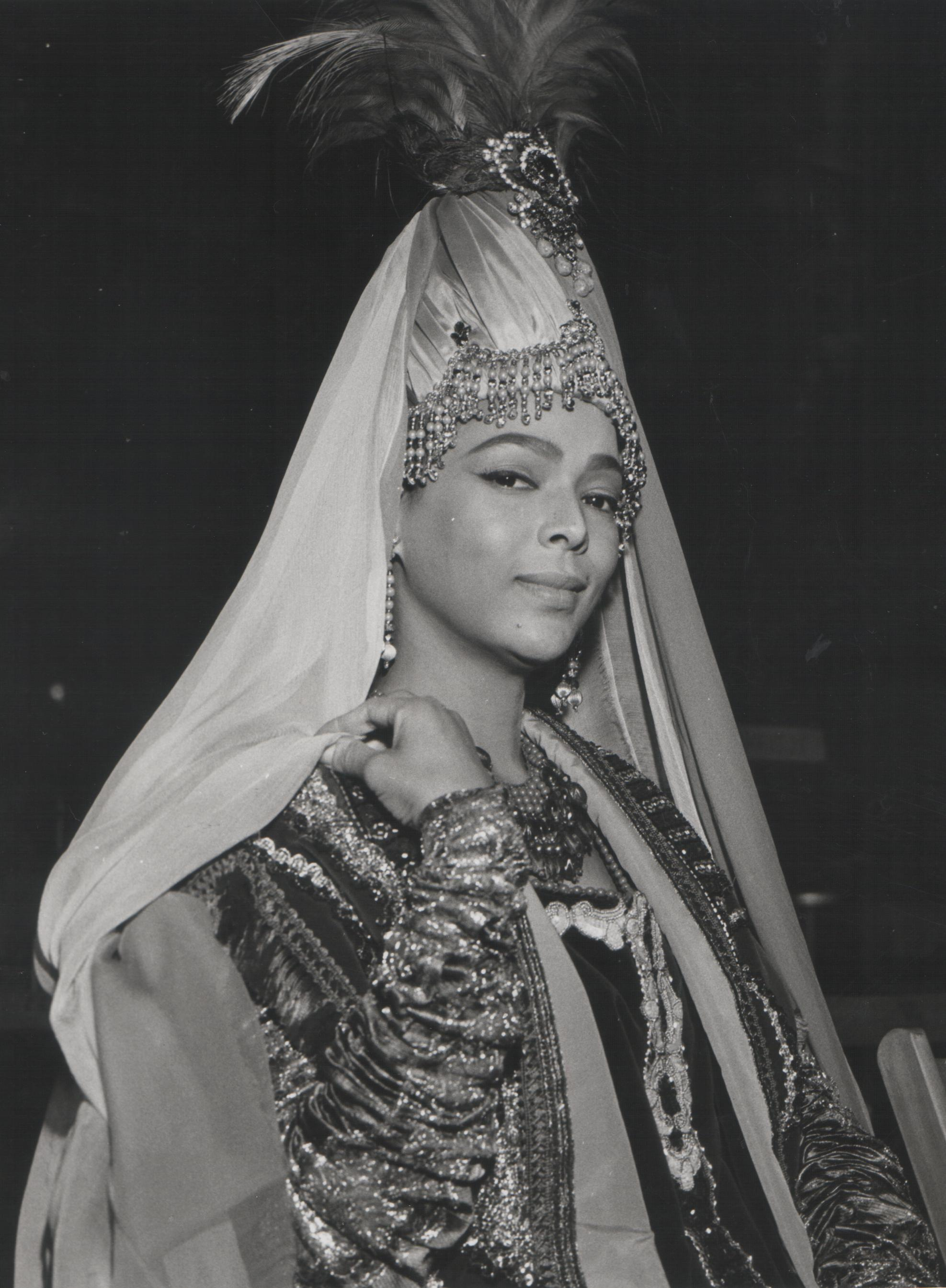
Dorothy Dandridge and Alain Delon during the first filming of L'Échiquier de Dieu in Belgrade, Yugoslavia in 1962.

Unfinished film credits of Alain Delon
| Year | Title | Role | Notes | Ref(s) |
|---|---|---|---|---|
| 1962 | God's Chessboard (French: L'Échiquier de Dieu) | Marco Polo | The project, titled L'Échiquier de Dieu (English: God's Chessboard), materialized in 1962 with Christian-Jaque as director, Alain Delon in the role of Marco Polo, Dorothy Dandridge as Empress Zaire, and Jean Marais in the role of the father. Filming was interrupted due to inadequate financial production and trouble casting secondary roles. A new production resumed filming in 1963, with Denys de La Patellière and Noël Howard as the directors while the role of Marco Polo was given to German actor Horst Buchholz, who, at the time, was considered a rival of Alain Delon. The film, now titled La Fabuleuse Aventure de Marco Polo (or Marco the Magnificent), was released in 1965. According to Christian-Jaque, none of his scenes were retained in the final release. | |
| 1970 | Die Boss, Die Gently (French: Crève patron, crève tranquille, Italian: Crepa padrone, crepa tranquillo) | Mercenary | An abandoned Italian and French co-production about mercenaries in Africa starring Delon and James Mason, and directed by Jacques Deray and Piero Schivazappa. | |

== Television ==
Television credits of Alain Delon
| Year | Title | Role | Director | Notes | Ref(s) |
|---|---|---|---|---|---|
| 1962 | Le chien | Lui | François Chalais | Television film | |
| 1978 | Le bel indifférent | Émile | Marion Sarraut | Television film | |
| 1987 | Dear America: Letters Home from Vietnam | Narrator | Bill Couturié | Voice; documentary | |
| 1988 | Cinéma | Julien Manda | Philippe Lefebvre | Miniseries (3 episodes) | |
| 2002 | Fabio Montale | Fabio Montale | José Pinheiro | Miniseries (3 episodes) | |
| 2003 | Le lion | John Bullit | José Pinheiro | Television film | |
| 2003–04 | Frank Riva | Frank Riva | Patrick Jamain | 6 episodes; also producer | |
| 2010 | Un mari de trop | Maxime de Rougemont | Louis Choquette | Television film | |
| 2011 | L'Occupation intime | Narrator | Isabelle Clarke | Voice; documentary | |

== Stage ==
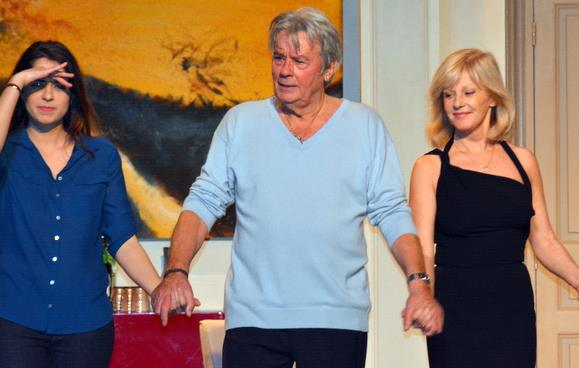
Alain Delon at the end of a performance of Une journée ordinaire in December 2013.

Stage credits of Alain Delon
| Year | Production | Role | Playwright | Director | Theatre | Notes | Ref(s) |
|---|---|---|---|---|---|---|---|
| 1961 | 'Tis Pity She's a Whore | Giovanni | John Ford | Luchino Visconti | Théâtre de Paris | | |
| 1968 | Les Yeux crevés | Dino | Jean Cau | Raymond Rouleau | Théâtre du Gymnase | | |
| 1996 | Variations énigmatiques | Abel Znorko | Éric-Emmanuel Schmitt | Bernard Murat | Théâtre Marigny | | |
| 1998 | Variations énigmatiques | Abel Znorko | Éric-Emmanuel Schmitt | Bernard Murat | Théâtre de Paris | | |
| 2004 | Les Montagnes russes | | Éric Assous | Anne Bourgeois | Théâtre Marigny | | |
| 2007 | The Bridges of Madison County | Robert Kincaid | Robert James Waller | Anne Bourgeois | Théâtre Marigny | | |
| 2008 | Love Letters | Philippe Noiret | A. R. Gurney | Alain Delon | Théâtre de la Madeleine | | |
| 2011 | Une journée ordinaire | Julien | Éric Assous | Jean-Luc Moreau | Théâtre des Bouffes-Parisiens | | |
| 2013 | Une journée ordinaire | Julien | Éric Assous | Anne Bourgeois | Tour | | |

== Discography ==
Music credits of Alain Delon
| Year | Title | Soundtrack/album | Notes | Ref(s) |
|---|---|---|---|---|
| 1967 | "Laetitia" | Les Aventuriers | | |
| 1973 | "Paroles, paroles" (with Dalida) | Julien | French-language cover of the Italian song "Parole parole" by Mina and Alberto Lupo. | |
| 1983 | "Thought I'd Ring You" (with Shirley Bassey) | —N/a | | |
| 1985 | "I Don't Know" (with Phyllis Nelson) | Parole de flic | | |
| 1987 | "Comme au cinéma" | —N/a | Music by Romano Musumarra. | |
| 2006 | "Modern Style" (Françoise Hardy featuring Alain Delon) | (Parenthèses...) | Music and lyrics by Jean Bart. Delon appears as a featured artist. | |
| 2011 | "Pauvre Rutebeuf" (Nana Mouskouri featuring Alain Delon) | Rendez-Vous | Music and Lyrics by Léo Ferré and Rutebeuf. | |
| 2013 | "Les Moulins de mon cœur" | Michel Legrand Anthology | French-language version of "The Windmills of Your Mind" from the film The Thomas Crown Affair (1968), translation by Eddy Marnay. Recorded in 1968 and published in the Michel Legrand Anthology 15-CD box set by EmArcy Records. | |
| 2019 | "Je n'aime que toi" | —N/a | Lyrics by Julia Paris and music by Rick Allison. | |

== Shows ==
| Year | Title | Venue | Notes | Ref(s) |
|---|---|---|---|---|
| 1978 | La Cinéscénie | Puy du Fou | | |
| 2000 | La Bataille du Donjon | Puy du Fou | Narrator | |
| 2016 | Génération de Gaulle | Mémorial Charles de Gaulle | Video mapping collaboration with Christophe Marlard at the 4th edition of De Gaulle en Grand, projected on the croix de Lorraine at Mémorial Charles de Gaulle in Colombey-les-Deux-Églises. | |
| 2017 | Génération de Gaulle | Mémorial Charles de Gaulle | 2nd edition | |
| 2018 | Génération de Gaulle | Mémorial Charles de Gaulle | 3rd edition | |

== References and sources ==
=== Sources ===
- Chiesi, Roberto (2003). Alain Delon (in French). Gremese Editore. ISBN 978-88-7301-498-0.
- Nowell-Smith, Geoffrey (2003). Luchino Visconti (3rd ed.). London: BFI Publishing.
- Durant, Philippe (2004). Alain Delon, Jean-Paul Belmondo: destins croisés (in French). Carnot. ISBN 978-2-84855-084-8.
- Rees-Roberts, Nick; Waldron, Darren, eds. (27 August 2015). Alain Delon: Style, Stardom and Masculinity. Bloomsbury Publishing. ISBN 978-1-62356-445-2.
- Bourdon, Laurent (15 November 2017). Définitivement Belmondo. Larousse. ISBN 978-2-03-594776-5.
