= List of French films of 1974 =

A list of films produced in France in 1974.

== Films ==
Title	Director	Cast	Genre	Notes
And Now My Love	Claude Lelouch	Marthe Keller, Charles Denner, André Dussollier	Drama	French–Italian co-production
And Then There Were None	Peter Collinson	Oliver Reed, Richard Attenborough, Elke Sommer	—N/a	British-West German-Spanish–French–Italian co-production
Arabian Nights	Pier Paolo Pasolini	Ninetto Davoli, Franco Merli, Ines Pellegrini	Adventure, fantasy	Italian–French co-production
Black Thursday	Michel Mitrani	Christine Pascal, Christian Rist, Michel Auclair	Drama	
Blood for Dracula	Paul Morrissey	Joe Dallesandro, Udo Kier, Maxime McKendry	Horror	Italian–French co-production
Borsalino & Co.	Jacques Deray	Alain Delon, Riccardo Cucciolla, Catherine Rouvel	Crime	French–Italian–West German co-production
By the Blood of Others	Marc Simenon	Yves Beneyton, Francis Blanche, Bernard Blier		French-Italian-Canadian co-production
Celestine, Maid at Your Service	Jesús Franco	Lina Romay, Howard Vernon, Olivier Mathot	Comedy	
Celine and Julie Go Boating	Jacques Rivette	Juliet Berto, Dominique Labourier, Bulle Ogier	Avant-garde	
Charlotte	Roger Vadim	Sirpa Lane, Michel Duchaussoy, Mathieu Carrière	Thriller	French–West German–Italian co-production
Chinese in Paris	Jean Yanne		Comedy	
The Clockmaker	Bertrand Tavernier	Philippe Noiret, Jean Rochefort, Jacques Denis	Drama	
Countess Perverse	Jesús Franco	Alice Arno, Robert Woods, Howard Vernon		
The Demoniacs	Jean Rollin	Joëlle Coeur, Marie-France Morel, Britt Anders	Adult	
Emmanuelle	Just Jaeckin	Sylvia Kristel, Alain Cuny, Daniel Sarki	Adult	
Exorcism	Jesús Franco	Lina Romay, Catherine Laferrière, Lynn Monteil		French-Belgian co-production
Force 8	Pierre Sisser	Christian Alers, Pierre Fuger, Agnes Desroches		
Going Places	Bertrand Blier	Gérard Depardieu, Miou-Miou, Patrick Dewaere	Comedy-drama	
How to Seduce a Virgin	Jesús Franco	Alice Arno, Robert Woods, Howard Vernon		
Icy Breasts	Georges Lautner	Alain Delon, Mireille Darc, Claude Brasseur		French-Italian co-production
Impossible Is Not French	Robert Lamoureux	Jean Lefebvre, Pierre Mondy, Pierre Tornade	Comedy	
The Infernal Trio	Francis Girod	Michel Piccoli, Romy Schneider	Horror	French-Italian-West German co-production
The Irony of Chance	Édouard Molinaro	Pierre Clémenti, Marie-Hélène Breillat, Jacques Spiesser	War drama	
Lacombe Lucien	Louis Malle	Pierre Blaise, Aurore Clément, Holger Löwenadler	Drama	French–Italian–West German co-production
Lancelot du Lac	Robert Bresson	Luc Simon, Humbert Balsan, Vladmir Antolek-Oresk	Drama	French–Italian co-production
Un linceul n'a pas de poches	Jean-Pierre Mocky	Jean-Pierre Mocky, Myriam Mezieres, Jean Carmet		
Lorna the Exorcist	Jesús Franco	Lina Romay, Jacqueline Laurent, Guy Delorme	Horror	
Love at the Top	Michel Deville	Jean-Louis Trintignant, Jean-Pierre Cassel, Romy Schneider, Jane Birkin	Comedy, Drama	French-Italian co-production
Loving in the Rain	Jean-Claude Brialy	Romy Schneider, Nino Castelnuovo, Mehdi El Glaoui	Drama, romance	French-Italian-West German co-production
The Lustful Amazon	Jesús Franco	Wal Davis, Alice Arno, Robert Woods	Adventure	
The Mouth Agape	Maurice Pialat	Monique Mélinand, Philippe Léotard, Hubert Deschamps	Drama	
My Little Loves	Jean Eustache	Martin Loeb, Ingrid Caven, Dionys Mascolo	Drama	
Nuits Rouges	Georges Franju	Gayle Hunnicutt, Jacques Champreux, Josephine Chaplin	Crime, thriller	French–Italian co-production
The Others	Hugo Santiago	Patrice Dally, Noëlle Chatelet, Roger Planchon	Drama, romance	
Parade	Jacques Tati	Jacques Tati, Karl Kossmayer, Pierre Bramma	Comedy	
The Phantom of Liberty	Luis Buñuel	Jean-Claude Brialy, Monica Vitti, Paul Frankeur	Avant-garde	French–Italian co-production
Le Protecteur	Roger Hanin	Juliet Berto, Georges Geret, Roger Coggio		French-Spanish co-production
The Return of the Tall Blond Man with One Black Shoe	Yves Robert	Pierre Richard, Jean Carmet, Mireille Darc	Comedy	
The Secret	Robert Enrico	Jean-Louis Trintignant, Marlène Jobert, Philippe Noiret	Crime	French-Italian co-production
Stavisky	Alain Resnais	Jean-Paul Belmondo, François Périer, Charles Boyer	Drama	French–Italian co-production
Successive Slidings of Pleasure	Alain Robbe-Grillet	Anicée Alvina, Olga Georges-Picot, Jean-Louis Trintignant	Crime	
The Suspects	Michel Wyn	Mimsy Farmer, Paul Meurisse, Bruno Cremer		French-Italian co-production
Sweet Movie	Dušan Makavejev	Carole Laure, Pierre Clémenti, Anna Prucnal	Avant-garde, comedy	French–Canadian–West German co-production
There's a Bone in the Mill	Raoul André	Michel Galabru, Paul Préboist, Daniel Prévost	Comedy	
There's Nothing Wrong with Being Good to Yourself	Claude Mulot	Jean Lefebvre, Françoise Lemieux, Michel Galabru, Darry Cowl	Comedy	
Three Tough Guys	Duccio Tessari	Lino Ventura, Isaac Hayes, Fred Williamson	—N/a	Italian-French co-production
Tender Dracula	Pierre Grunstein	Peter Cushing, Alida Valli, Miou-Miou	Horror	
Verdict	André Cayatte	Sophia Loren, Jean Gabin, Michel Albertini	Crime, drama	French–Italian co-production
Violins at the Ball	Michel Drach	David Drach, Michel Drach, Jean-Louis Trintignant	Drama	
The Woman in Red Boots	Juan Luis Buñuel	Catherine Deneuve, Fernando Rey, Adalberto Maria Merli	Comedy, Drama, Fantasy	French-Italian-Spanish co-production

== See also ==
- 1974 in France

== Notes ==
=== References ===
- "Three Tough Guys". American Film Institute. Archived from the original on 3 April 2014.
- "And Then There Were None". BFI Film & TV Database. London: British Film Institute. Archived from the original on January 14, 2009.
- "Les Seins de glace (1974)". Bifi.fr (in French). Archived from the original on December 4, 2013.
- "Les Guichets Du Louvre". Bifi.fr (in French). Archived from the original on February 2, 2014.
- "Ein Unbekannter rechnet ab". Filmportal.de (in German). Archived from the original on December 27, 2013.
- "Ein wildes Leben". Filmportal.de. Archived from the original on December 31, 2014.
- Charney, Leo. "Celine and Julie Go Boating (1974)". AllMovie. Archived from the original on April 15, 2012.
- Curti, Roberto (2013). Italian Crime Filmography, 1968-1980. McFarland. ISBN 978-0786469765.
- Curti, Roberto (2017). Italian Gothic Horror Films, 1970–1979. McFarland & Company. ISBN 978-1476629605.
- Curti, Roberto; Lafond, Frank (2026). French Thrillers of the 1970s: Volume I, Crime Films. Jefferson, North Carolina: McFarland & Company. ISBN 978-1-4766-8681-3. LCCN 2025048366.
- Erickson, Hal. "Borsalino & Co. (1974)". AllMovie. All Media Guide. Archived from the original on October 15, 2012.
- Erickson, Hal. "La Jeune Fille Assassination". AllMovie. Archived from the original on May 9, 2012.
- Erickson, Hal. "Emmanuelle (1974)". AllMovie. Archived from the original on June 15, 2012.
- Erickson, Hal. "Going Places (1974)". AllMovie. Archived from the original on June 22, 2013.
- Erickson, Hal. "The Clockmaker (1974)". AllMovie. Archived from the original on March 2, 2014.
- Erickson, Hal. "Verdict (1974)". AllMovie. Archived from the original on March 2, 2014.
- Firsching, Robert. "Demoniacs (1973)". AllMovie. All Media Guide. Archived from the original on August 20, 2019.
- Fountain, Clarke. "Les Guichets Du Louvre (1973)". AllMovie. Archived from the original on March 2, 2014.
- Hallenbeck, Bruce G. (2009). Comedy-Horror Films: A Chronological History, 1914–2008. McFarland & Company. ISBN 978-0786433322.
- Seibert, Perry. "Toute une Vie (1974)". AllMovie. Archived from the original on October 18, 2012.
- Shipka, Danny (2011). Perverse Titillation: The Exploitation Cinema of Italy, Spain and France, 1960–1980. McFarland & Company. ISBN 978-0786448883.
- Thrower, Stephen (2015). Murderous Passions: The Delirious Cinema of Jesús Franco: Volume 1:1959-1974. Strange Attractor Press. ISBN 978-1-907222-31-3.
