= Pascal Jardin =

French screenwriter (1934–1980)

Pascal Jardin (14 May 1934 in Paris – 30 July 1980 in Villejuif) was a French screenwriter.

== Works ==
- 1957: Les Petits Malins, novel, Éditions Horay
- 1971: La Guerre à neuf ans, Grasset 1971, preface by Emmanuel Berl
- 1972: Toupie la rage, novel, Bernard Grasset
- 1973: Guerre après guerre, Grasset & Fasquelle
- 1975: Je te reparlerai d’amour, novel, Juliard
- 1978: Le Nain jaune, novel, Julliard, (Grand prix du roman de l'Académie française)
- 1980: La Bête à bon dieu, Flammarion, postface by François Mitterrand
- 1980: Madame est sortie, Flammarion, play, preface by Jean Anouilh
- Comme avant, play, Septembre 1976, unpublished

== Filmography ==
- 1960: Classe tous risques by Claude Sautet
- 1961: Les Amours célèbres by Michel Boisrond
- 1962: The Law of Men by Charles Gérard
- 1963: À couteaux tirés by Charles Gérard
- 1964: Les Félins by René Clément
- 1964: Monsieur by Jean-Paul Le Chanois
- 1964: That Tender Age by Gilles Grangier
- 1965: God's Thunder by Denys de La Patellière
- 1965: Marvelous Angelique by Bernard Borderie
- 1966: Angelique and the King by Bernard Borderie
- 1966: Le Voyage du père by Denys de La Patellière
- 1966: Black Sun by Denys de La Patellière
- 1967: Untamable Angelique by Bernard Borderie
- 1968: Angelique and the Sultan by Bernard Borderie
- 1968: Le Tatoué by Denys de La Patellière
- 1969: Les Étrangers by Jean-Pierre Desagnat
- 1969: Madly by Roger Kahane
- 1970: La Horse by Pierre Granier-Deferre
- 1970: Sortie de secours (film) by Roger Kahane
- 1971: Le Chat by Pierre Granier-Deferre
- 1971: La Veuve Couderc by Pierre Granier-Deferre
- 1971: Doucement les basses by Jacques Deray
- 1972: Le Tueur by Denys de La Patellière
- 1973: Le Train by Pierre Granier-Deferre
- 1974: La Race des seigneurs by Pierre Granier-Deferre
- 1974: Borsalino & Co by Jacques Deray
- 1975: Le Vieux Fusil by Robert Enrico
- 1975: La Cage by Pierre Granier-Deferre
- 1978: La Zizanie by Claude Zidi
- 1978: Sale rêveur by Jean-Marie Périer
- 1979: Le Toubib by Pierre Granier-Deferre
- 1980: Charlie Bravo by Claude Bernard-Aubert
- 1982: Hécate, maîtresse de la nuit by Daniel Schmid
