= Philippe Castelli =

French actor (1926–2006)

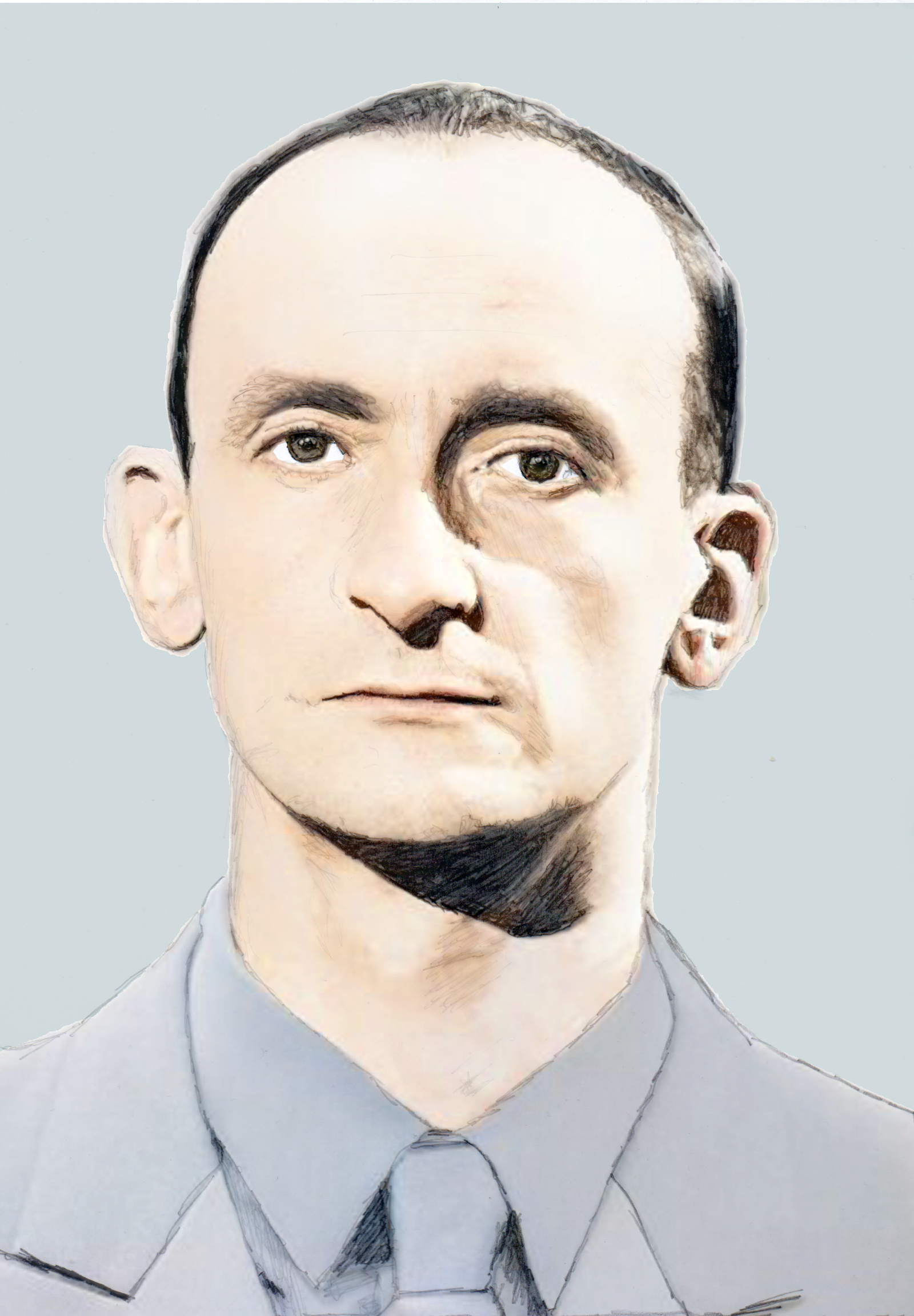
- Born: 8 June 1926; Chaville, France
- Died: 16 April 2006 (aged 79); Paris, France
- Occupation: Actor
- Years active: 1960–1992

Philippe Castelli (8 June 1926 – 16 April 2006) was a French film actor. He appeared in 100 films between 1960 and 1992.

== Selected filmography ==
- Les Bonnes Femmes (1960) – Le régisseur
- Wise Guys (1961) – Le portier au vernissage (uncredited)
- Cartouche (1962) – Le commissaire (uncredited)
- The Elusive Corporal (1962) – Le prisonnier électricien
- À fleur de peau (1962) – Kleber
- Landru (1963) – Un inspecteur de police
- Les Bricoleurs (1963) – Le facteur
- Carom Shots (1963) – Le portier du 321 (uncredited)
- The Bread Peddler (1963) – Le premier policier aux ordres du préfet de police
- Les Tontons flingueurs (1963) – Le tailleur
- Une ravissante idiote (1964) – Le client du restaurant Lion's (uncredited)
- Dandelions by the Roots (1964) – L'interne (uncredited)
- Aimez-vous les femmes? (1964) – Un adepte de la secte
- Les durs à cuire ou Comment supprimer son prochain sans perdre l'appétit (1964) – Le critique (uncredited)
- Une souris chez les hommes (1964) – Le gardien du Louvre (uncredited)
- Jaloux comme un tigre (1964) – Le policier du constat (uncredited)
- Patate (1964) – Le facteur (uncredited)
- La grande frousse (1964) – Le journaliste photographe (uncredited)
- Male Companion (1964) – L'homme qui trompe Balthazar (uncredited)
- Fantômas (1964) – L'agent en faction (uncredited)
- The Great Spy Chase (1964) – Le portier d'Istanbul / The Porter in Istanbul
- Yo Yo (1965) – Le domestique
- Quand passent les faisans (1965) – Le barman (uncredited)
- How to Keep the Red Lamp Burning (1965) – Boudu (segment "Bons vivants, Les") (uncredited)
- Fantômas se déchaîne (1965) – L'inspecteur en retard (uncredited)
- La sentinelle endormie (1966) – Un grognard
- Galia (1966) – L'homme au téléphone
- Monnaie de singe (1966) – Le clochard
- Ne nous fâchons pas (1966) – (uncredited)
- Your Money or Your Life (1966) – Le maître fromager (uncredited)
- Les enquiquineurs (1966)
- The Night of the Generals (1967) – French Forensic Physician (uncredited)
- La grande lessive (1968) – Tamanoir, un technicien OVTF
- Borsalino (1970) – Le garçon d'hôtel (uncredited)
- Promise at Dawn (1970) – Crew Member
- Laisse aller... c'est une valse (1971) – Le directeur de la prison
- Easy, Down There! (1971) – Le grand vicaire
- Le drapeau noir flotte sur la marmite (1971) – Chef de gare
- Le viager (1972) – L'artiste de cabaret
- Chut! (1972) – Le ministre
- La classe du sexe (1973) – Le journaliste
- Quelques messieurs trop tranquilles (1973) – Récitant / Le reporter
- Les volets clos (1973)
- The Four Charlots Musketeers (1974)
- Un amour de pluie (1974) – Le portier
- Deux grandes filles dans un pyjama (1974) – L'avocat (uncredited)
- Icy Breasts (1974) – L'homme dans le parking souterrain
- The Four Charlots Musketeers 2 (1974)
- Borsalino & Co. (1974) – Le coiffeur (uncredited)
- Sexuellement vôtre (1974) – Le majordome
- Le bordel, 1ère époque; 1900 (1974) – Le sous-préfet
- Les bidasses s'en vont en guerre (1974) – L'huissier
- Soldat Duroc, ça va être ta fête! (1975) – Le colonel
- Couche-moi dans le sable et fais jaillir ton pétrole... (1975) – Le mort
- Cher Victor (1975) – Le neveu
- C'est dur pour tout le monde (1975) – For Ever #1
- Bons baisers de Hong Kong (1975) – Le policier à la circulation
- La grande récré (1976) – Un Promoteur
- Man in a Hurry (1977) – L'ami du ministre (uncredited)
- Death of a Corrupt Man (1977) – Le buraliste (uncredited)
- Black-Out (1977) – Le bousculé
- On peut le dire sans se fâcher (1978)
- One Two Two (1978) – Béret français
- Ils sont fous ces sorciers (1978)
- Victims of Vice (Brigade mondaine) (1978) – Le maître d'hôtel
- Judith Therpauve (1978) – Huissier de rédaction
- Le cavaleur (1979) – Marcel
- Le temps des vacances (1979) – Lemaître d'hôtel d'Alexandre
- Cop or Hood (1979) – L'examinateur au permis de conduire
- Brigade mondaine: La secte de Marrakech (1979) – Le monsieur distingué
- The Wonderful Day (1980) – Le concierge
- Les aventures de Guidon Fûté (1980) – L'homme qui se cure le nez
- Une merveilleuse journée (1980) – Le constipé
- Est-ce bien raisonnable? (1981) – L'appariteur
- Signé Furax (1981) – Un agent au barrage
- Prends ta rolls et va pointer (1981) – Pérol, le propriétaire du pavillon
- Le jour se lève et les conneries commencent (1981) – Maurice
- Pour la peau d'un flic (1981) – Jean le barman
- On s'en fout... nous on s'aime (1982) – Le professeur de français
- Plus beau que moi, tu meurs (1982) – Père Eusébio
- Le Battant (1983) – Nestor, réceptionniste hôtel Trianon
- Ça va pas être triste (1983) – Ludovick
- The Secret of the Selenites (1983) – Lundi (voice)
- Retenez Moi...Ou Je Fais Un Malheur (1984) – Le brigadier
- Rebelote (1984) – L'instituteur
- Aldo et Junior (1984) – Gaston
- Ave Maria (1984) – Gustave Leone
- Par où t'es rentré ? On t'a pas vu sortir (1984) – Grégori
- Liberté, égalité, choucroute (1985) – Docteur Guillotin
- Banana's boulevard (1986) – L'employé de l'ANPE
- À deux minutes près (1989) – Le garçon de la brasserie
