= Monsieur (1964 film) =

1964 film

- Directed by: Jean-Paul Le Chanois
- Written by: Claude Gével (play); Georges Darrier; Pascal Jardin; Claude Sautet; Anya Corwin-Böckmann
- Produced by: Raymond Danon; Moris Ergas; Alexander Grüter
- Starring: Jean Gabin; Liselotte Pulver; Mireille Darc
- Cinematography: Louis Page
- Edited by: Emma Le Chanois
- Music by: Georges Van Parys
- Production companies: Les Films Copernic; Corona Filmproduktion; Zebra Film
- Distributed by: Comacico (France)
- Release date: 22 April 1964
- Running time: 105 minutes
- Countries: France; Italy; West Germany
- Language: French

Mireille Darc and Jean Gabin

Monsieur is a 1964 French-Italian-West German comedy film directed by Jean-Paul Le Chanois and starring Jean Gabin, Liselotte Pulver and Mireille Darc.

It was made as a co-production between France, Italy and West Germany.

The film's sets were designed by Jean Mandaroux.

== Plot ==
Overwhelmed by the death of his wife, a rich Parisian banker called René Duchêne is walking towards the River Seine to throw himself in when he is accosted by a prostitute. They recognise each other, because she used to be the chambermaid. When she learns that her former mistress is dead, she reveals that the wife he adored had made him a laughing stock by her multiple adulteries. He decides to let the world think he has committed suicide and to go into hiding.

Answering an advertisement for a couple to be butler and maid in a country house, he is hired under the name of Georges Baudin, with Suzanne posing as his daughter to be the maid. Their employers are Edmond Bernadac, a rich and staid businessman, and his flighty new Swiss wife Elisabeth, a former air hostess who is fond of alcohol and men.

Their new butler rapidly becomes indispensable at smoothing over the continual problems which beset the household, one being that the son of the house immediately wants to marry Suzanne and has therefore to win the permission of her supposed father. He meanwhile has to contend with problems at home, where his dead wife's parents have moved in and claim to be his heirs. In the end he has to come back to life in order to thwart them and to allow Suzanne to marry the boy she loves.

== Cast ==
- Jean Gabin as Monsieur
- Liselotte Pulver as Elizabeth Bernadac
- Mireille Darc as Suzanne
- Philippe Noiret as Edmond Bernadac
- Gaby Morlay as Madame Bernadac mère
- Gabrielle Dorziat as La belle-mère
- Peter Vogel as Michel Corbeil
- Marina Berti as Madame Danoni
- Claudio Gora as Danoni
- Berthe Granval as Nathalie Bernadac
- Jean-Paul Moulinot as Me Flamand, le notaire
- Jean-Pierre Darras as José
- Henri Crémieux as Le beau-père
- Heinz Blau as Alain Bernadac
- Maryse Martin as Justine
- Andrex as Antoine
- Alain Bouvette as Marc
- Jean Lefebvre as Le detective privé
- Max Elder as Le valet de chambre
- Armand Meffre as Le patron du bistrot
- Jean Champion as Le patron de l'hôtel
- Pierre Moncorbier as Le serrurier
- Angela Minervini as La serveuse du snack
- Christian Brocard as Un client sans-gêne
- André Dalibert as Le tailleur
- Paul Faivre as Le curé
- Michel Nastorg as Le docteur
- Raoul Henry as L'invité Bretteville
- René Fleur as Le décorateur

== Bibliography ==
- Bock, Hans-Michael & Bergfelder, Tim. The Concise CineGraph. Encyclopedia of German Cinema. Berghahn Books, 2009.
