= 1848 (film) =

1949 film

- Directed by: Marguerite de la Mure; Victoria Mercanton
- Starring: Bernard Blier
- Narrated by: Bernard Blier
- Cinematography: André Dumaître
- Music by: Guy Bernard
- Release date: 1949
- Running time: 20 minutes
- Country: France
- Language: French

1848 (French: La Révolution de 1848) is a 1949 French short documentary film directed by Marguerite de la Mure and Victoria Mercanton and starring Bernard Blier. The film explains the French Revolution of 1848. Bernard Blier's narration is supported by pictures once drawn by contemporary artists including Honoré Daumier.

1848 was nominated for an Academy Award for Best Documentary Short. The Academy Film Archive preserved 1848 in 2010.
