= Man in a Hurry =

- Directed by: Édouard Molinaro
- Written by: Christopher Frank; Maurice Rheims
- Produced by: Ralph Baum; Raymond Danon; Alain Delon
- Starring: Alain Delon; Mireille Darc; Michel Duchaussoy; Monica Guerritore
- Cinematography: Jean Charvein; Maurice Fellous
- Edited by: Monique Isnardon
- Music by: Carlo Rustichelli
- Distributed by: AMLF
- Release date: 1977
- Countries: France; Italy
- Language: French

Man in a Hurry (French: L'Homme pressé, Italian: L'ultimo giorno d'amore, released in UK as The Hurried Man) is a 1977 French-Italian drama film directed by Édouard Molinaro and starring Alain Delon and Mireille Darc. It is based on the novel The Man in a Hurry by Paul Morand. It recorded admissions of 730,581 in France.

== Cast ==
- Alain Delon as Pierre Niox
- Mireille Darc as Edwige de Bois-Rosé
- Michel Duchaussoy as Placide Justin
- Monica Guerritore as Marie de Bois-Rosé
- Marie Déa as Madame de Bois-Rosé
- Billy Kearns as Freeman
- André Falcon as Maurice
- Marco Perrin as Sirielle
- Stefano Patrizi as Vivien
- Muriel Catala as Katia
- Pierre Saintons as The African Minister
- Doura Mané as André Dubois
- Daniel Kamwa as The African Director
- Felice Andreasi as Daniela Hotel Receptionist
- André Dumas as Restaurant Manager
- Lyne Chardonnet as Air Hostess
- Geoffrey Carey as The Decorator
- Jacques Pisias as Dutertre
- Philippe Brigaud as Michel
- Dominique Zardi as Julien
- Philippe Castelli as Philippe
- Henri Attal as Auction House's Employee
