= Jacques Rispal =

French actor (1923–1986)

- Born: 1 August 1923; Belvès, France
- Died: 9 February 1986 (aged 62); Suresnes, France
- Occupation: Actor
- Years active: 1952–1986

Jacques Rispal (1 August 1923 – 9 February 1986) was a French film actor. He appeared in 100 films between 1952 and 1986.

== Filmography ==
- Crimson Curtain (1952)
- A Man Named Rocca (1961) - (uncredited)
- Five Miles to Midnight (1962)
- Graduation Year (1964) - Le prof Cachou
- Aimez-vous les femmes ? (1964) - Maley
- L'Âge ingrat (1964) - Brunin - le boulanger (uncredited)
- The War Is Over (1966) - Manolo
- Who Are You, Polly Maggoo? (1966)
- Si j'étais un espion (1967)
- Tante Zita (1968) - Le sergent
- L'écume des jours (1968)
- Stolen Kisses (1968) - Monsieur Colin
- The Milky Way (1969)
- The Uninvited (1969) - Le boulanger
- The Confession (1970) - L'ancien secrétaire
- Bed and Board (1970) - Monsieur Desbois
- Ils (1970) - L'employé du fisc
- Le portrait de Marianne (1971) - Karl Prinzman
- Le Chat (1971) - Le docteur
- Le Prussien (1971, TV Movie) - Auguste
- La nuit bulgare (1972)
- Le soldat Laforêt (1972) - Gillorgues
- The Discreet Charm of the Bourgeoisie (1972) - Gendarme
- Les caïds (1972)
- La Scoumoune (1972) - M. Dubois, le concessionnaire de cercueils
- The Dominici Affair (1973) - Paul Maillet
- The Invitation (1973) - René Mermet
- Na! (1973) - Imbert (uncredited)
- Le mataf (1973) - L'infirmier
- Two Men in Town (1973) - Le juge (uncredited)
- The Train (1973) - L' employé de l'état civil
- Lacombe, Lucien (1974) - M. Laborit
- Par le sang des autres (1974)
- Going Places (1974) - Watchman at the Mammouth Store
- On s'est trompé d'histoire d'amour (1974) - M. Dalmart, le beau-père d'Anne
- Un nuage entre les dents (1974) - L'homme chauve
- France société anonyme (1974)
- Les guichets du Louvre (1974)
- Fear Over the City (1975) - Cacahuète
- Act of Aggression (1975) - Raoul Dumouriez
- Section spéciale (1975) - Abraham Trzebrucki
- Cher Victor (1975) - Charret
- Il faut vivre dangereusement (1975) - Le régisseur du cabaret
- Le chant du départ (1975) - Guitton
- The Gypsy (1975) - Docteur J. Weiss, le vétérinaire
- The French Detective (1975) - Mercier
- Calmos (1976) - L'assassin
- L'affiche rouge (1976) - Abraham
- Boomerang (1976) - Albert Chiusi
- Les Ambassadeurs (1976) - M. Pierre, le concierge
- La bulle (1976) - Le père de Lola
- Comme la lune (1977) - Emile Rabu
- La Menace (1977) - Paco, Trucks Dispatcher
- Le mille-pattes fait des claquettes (1977) - Le paysan
- Peppermint Soda (1977) - Le concierge du Lycée
- Pourquoi pas! (1977) - Le père de Louis
- The Recourse to the Method (1978)
- The Adolescent (1979) - M. Jardin
- La ville à prendre (1979)
- French Postcards (1979)
- Les turlupins (1980) - Loin du Ciel
- My American Uncle (1980) - L'homme bousculé par René
- Pour la peau d'un flic (1981) - Professeur Bachhoffer
- Beau-père (1981) - Le chauffeur de taxi
- Lucie sur Seine (1982) - Le garagiste
- Vive la sociale! (1983) - Directeur du préventorium
- Le thé à la menthe (1984) - Le clochard raciste
