= Elle boit pas, elle fume pas, elle drague pas, mais... elle cause ! =

1970 film

- Directed by: Michel Audiard
- Screenplay by: Michel Audiard; Michel Lebrun; Jean-Marie Poiré; Fred Kassak (novel)
- Produced by: Alain Poiré
- Starring: Annie Girardot; Bernard Blier; Mireille Darc
- Cinematography: Pierre Petit
- Edited by: Monique Isnardon; Robert Isnardon
- Music by: Georges Van Parys
- Distributed by: Gaumont Distribution
- Release date: 17 April 1970
- Running time: 85 minutes
- Country: France
- Language: French

She Does Not Drink, Smoke or Flirt But... She Talks (French: Elle boit pas, elle fume pas, elle drague pas, mais... elle cause !) is a 1970 French comedy film directed by Michel Audiard.

It was shot at the Billancourt Studios in Paris.

== Plot ==
Germaine, a housekeeper, has three customers: a substitute bank cashier, a television personality, and a child educator, and learns some of their secrets. Revealing these secrets with ability, she influences that the cashier blackmails the television personality, who blackmails the educator, who blackmails the cashier.

Finally, the cashier murders the educator who blackmailed him, who is then murdered by the television personality. Finally, Germaine blackmails her to obtain an income.

== Cast ==
- Annie Girardot ... Germaine, the housekeeper of Alexandre, Francine and Monsieur Phalempin
- Bernard Blier ... Alexandre Liéthard, substitute cashier and sexually obsessed
- Mireille Darc ... Francine Marquette, television presenter and former contestant at the "ballets roses"
- Sim ... Monsieur Phalempin, educator at day and drag singer at night
- Catherine Samie ... Jannou Mareuil, a friend Francine
- Jean-Pierre Darras ... Georges de La Motte Brébière, the upcoming husband Francine
- Jean Le Poulain ... Monsieur Gruson, the main cashier, murdered by Alexandre
- Jean Carmet ... Marcel, barman of the "Triolet"
- Micheline Luccioni ... Lucette, called "Lulu", a friend of Alexandre
- Jean-Marie Rivière ... Fernand, the partner of Lucette
- Anicée Alvina ... Monique, the pregnant young girl on the television program
- Monique Morisi ... Juliette
- Daniel Lecourtois ... Monsieur Brimeux, CEO of the bank
- Robert Dalban ... Monsieur Delpuech, the principal of the bank
- Evelyne Dress ... the customer at the bank with the big hat
- Dominique Zardi ... professor of science in the forest
- Jacques Hilling ... the partyman with Francine
- Michel Audiard ... a sound engineer on television
- Marc Doelnitz ... an artist of Alcazar
