= Cher Victor =

1975 film

- Film poster
- Directed by: Robin Davis
- Written by: Robin Davis; Patrick Laurent
- Starring: Bernard Blier
- Cinematography: Yves Lafaye
- Edited by: José Pinheiro
- Music by: Bernard Gérard
- Release date: 1975
- Running time: 102 minutes
- Country: France
- Language: French

Cher Victor (French: Ce cher Victor) is a 1975 French comedy film directed by Robin Davis. It was entered into the 1975 Cannes Film Festival.

== Plot ==
Victor and Anselme are two aged men who are cohabitants for practical reasons. The widower Victor permanently picks on Anselme who still always remains rather nonchalant. When they try to organise a music festival they are joined by a lady named Anne who considers herself an accomplished singer. Victor picks at her too and unlike Anselme she cannot take it. Seeing that Anselme has had it and starts to hit back.

== Cast ==
- Bernard Blier as Anselme
- Jacques Dufilho as Victor Lasalle
- Alida Valli as Anne
- Jacqueline Doyen as Micheline
- Alice Reichen as Jeanne
- Philippe Castelli as the nephew
- Jacques Rispal as Charret

== Around the film ==
- At 41 min. 30 sec., one of the filming lights is reflected at the top left of the tiled facade of a bath and shower therapy establishment. Below the I in the word BAINS on the façade, a round wall light illuminates the front of the establishment.
- The building giving access to Anselme and Victor's home is located at 5 passage Saint-Paul. In fact, this passage is a dead end that leads to a door in Saint-Paul Church. The film makes it appear that 6, opposite the home, is rue d'Ormesson: Anselme exits to the left of the dead-end 6, walks along rue d'Ormesson, turns left into rue de Sévigné, which leads to the main entrance of the same church.
- The film was selected to represent France at the Cannes Film Festival.
