= The Tall Blond Man with One Black Shoe =

1972 film by Yves Robert

- Theatrical release poster
- French: Le Grand Blond avec une chaussure noire
- Directed by: Yves Robert
- Written by: Yves Robert; Francis Veber
- Produced by: Alain Poiré; Yves Robert
- Starring: Pierre Richard; Bernard Blier; Jean Rochefort; Mireille Darc
- Cinematography: René Mathelin
- Edited by: Ghislaine Desjonqueres
- Music by: Vladimir Cosma
- Production companies: Gaumont International; La Guéville; Madeleine Films
- Distributed by: Gaumont Distribution
- Release date: 6 December 1972
- Running time: 90 minutes
- Country: France
- Language: French
- Box office: $4.3 million (West Germany)

The Tall Blond Man with One Black Shoe (French: Le Grand Blond avec une chaussure noire) is a 1972 French spy comedy film directed by Yves Robert and written by Robert and Francis Veber, starring Pierre Richard, Bernard Blier, Jean Rochefort and Mireille Darc. Richard reprised his role as François Perrin in the sequel, The Return of the Tall Blond Man with One Black Shoe (1974), as well as playing a character with the same name in La Chèvre (1981).

The film was remade in English as The Man with One Red Shoe (1985), starring Tom Hanks and Dabney Coleman.

== Plot ==
Bernard Milan, the second-in-command of France's Counter-Espionage department, is out to discredit his chief Louis Toulouse so that he can supplant him. When a French heroin smuggler who has been arrested in New York claims that the drug smuggling was a secret mission on the orders of French Counter-Espionage (actually on Milan's orders), the resulting negative press reflects on Toulouse, who cannot prove that Milan was responsible. In retaliation, Toulouse hatches a plot to deal with his ambitious subordinate: in a room which he knows is filled with hidden microphones, he sends his assistant Perrache to Orly Airport at 9:30AM the next morning, making Milan (who has been listening) believe that Perrache has gone to meet a master spy who will expose Milan's treachery. However, Toulouse secretly instructs Perrache to choose someone at random from the crowd of travelers arriving at that time.

After considering several possibilities, Perrache selects François Perrin, an unsuspecting violinist, who is noticeable because, as the result of a practical joke played on him by his fellow orchestra members, he has arrived wearing a black shoe on one foot and a reddish-brown one on the other. Milan takes the bait and immediately begins a series of attempts to discover what Perrin knows—never realizing the fact that Perrin knows nothing at all about espionage. Milan's machinations place Perrin in a series of increasingly peculiar adventures which he either avoids or escapes from by pure luck (which only confirm Milan's increasingly paranoid suspicions), and although Perrin is largely oblivious to the mayhem occurring around him, he cannot help noticing Milan's top agent, the beautiful femme fatale Christine. Adding to the confusion is the fact that Perrin is having an affair with Paulette Lefebvre, the wife of his best friend Maurice (both of whom are musicians in the same orchestra as Perrin), and Maurice, upon accidentally hearing a recording of Perrin and Paulette having torrid sex (made by Milan's agents and listened to inside a floral delivery truck), mistakenly assumes that Paulette is having an affair with a florist. Toulouse and Perrache watch the unfolding chaos serenely, although Perrache is troubled by his chief's callousness toward the risk that Perrin might be killed.

Milan orders Christine to seduce Perrin and she greets him at her apartment's front door in a demure high-necked black-velvet dress, then turns around and shows that the dress is backless, displaying discreet buttock cleavage. They have sex in a slapstick love scene (watched by Milan and his cohorts on a television monitor), concluding with Milan's decision (despite Christine's belief that Perrin could not possibly be an agent) to have Perrin eliminated, which Toulouse plans to let happen to cover his tracks. Perrache defies his boss' orders to recall their agents to save the innocent Perrin.

More mayhem and treachery follows (including Maurice's learning the truth about his wife's affair, and Christine's defection from Milan's group to save Perrin, with whom she has fallen in love), climaxing in the deaths of not only agents from both Toulouse's and Milan's groups but also Milan himself, who only learns the truth about Perrin from Perrache just before he dies. Realizing how he has been fooled, Milan dies with a smile of appreciation. Maurice, who has repeatedly walked in on the aftermaths of the shoot-outs in Perrin's apartment, suffers a total mental breakdown.

At Orly Airport, Perrin pushes a huge Louis Vuitton steamer trunk in an airport luggage cart, talking softly to Christine, who is hidden inside. Their destination is Rio de Janeiro. Toulouse, who has been watching Perrin's departure on a monitor, instructs Perrache to contact Perrin when Perrin returns, remarking, "After all, he handles himself pretty well."

== Cast ==
- Pierre Richard as François Perrin
- Bernard Blier as Bernard Milan
- Jean Rochefort as Colonel Louis Toulouse
- Mireille Darc as Christine
- Tania Balachova as Louis Toulouse's mother
- Jean Carmet as Maurice Lefebvre
- Colette Castel as Paulette Lefebvre
- Paul Le Person as Perrache
- Jean Obé as Botrel
- Robert Castel as Georghiu
- Jean Saudray as Poucet
- Roger Caccia as Mr. Boudart
- Arlette Balkis as Mrs. Boudart
- Robert Dalban as the false deliveryman
- Jean Bouise as the minister

== Reception ==
On Rotten Tomatoes, the film holds an approval rating of 67% based on 4 positive and 2 negative critic reviews.

The film grossed $4.3 million in West Germany.

== Awards ==
The film won the Silver Bear award at the 23rd Berlin International Film Festival in 1973. It was nominated for Best Foreign Language Film by the U.S. National Board of Review.
