= Easy, Down There! =

- Directed by: Jacques Deray
- Written by: Pascal Jardin (dialogue); Jacques Deray (adaptation); Pascal Jardin (adaptation)
- Screenplay by: Pascal Jardin
- Produced by: Alain Delon
- Starring: Alain Delon; Paul Meurisse; Nathalie Delon
- Cinematography: Jean-Jacques Tarbès
- Edited by: Paul Cayatte
- Music by: Claude Bolling
- Color process: Eastmancolor
- Production companies: Adel Productions; Medusa Distribuzione
- Distributed by: Cinema International Corporation
- Release date: 9 April 1971
- Running time: 90 minutes
- Countries: France; Italy
- Language: French
- Box office: 1,009,536 admissions (France)

Easy, Down There! (French: Doucement les basses, Italian: L'uomo di Saint-Michael) is a 1971 French-Italian comedy film directed by Jacques Deray and starring Alain Delon, Paul Meurisse and Nathalie Delon.

== Plot ==
A priest gets a little hot under the collar when the wife he thought was dead unexpectedly returns.

== Cast ==
- Alain Delon as Simon Médieu
- Paul Meurisse as L'évêque
- Nathalie Delon as Rita
- Paul Préboist as Le vieil enfant de choeur
- André Bollet as Mickey
- Miranda Campa as La soeur gardienne
- Philippe Castelli as Le grand vicaire
- Serge Davri as Le Brigadier
- Carlo Nell as Le Gendarme
- Sylvie Lenoir as La chanteuse au Vieux Pirate
- Yvan Chiffre as Himself
- Lionel Vitrant as Himself
- Jean-Marie Lancelot as Marin au Vieux Pirate
- Julien Guiomar as Francisco

== See also ==
- List of French films of 1971
