= Fantasia Among the Squares =

1971 film by Gérard Pirès

- Directed by: Gérard Pirès
- Written by: Gérard Pirès
- Produced by: Pierre Braunberger
- Starring: Lino Ventura; Jean Yanne; Mireille Darc
- Cinematography: Edmond Richard
- Edited by: Françoise Garnault
- Music by: Ekseption
- Distributed by: Compagnie Française de Distribution Cinématographique (CFDC)
- Release date: 1971
- Running time: 90 minutes
- Countries: France; Italy
- Language: French

Fantasia Among the Squares is a 1971 French comedy film. It was directed by Gérard Pirès and stars Lino Ventura, Jean Yanne and Mireille Darc. Alain Delon has a cameo.

The French title was Fantasia chez les ploucs.

It was based on a novel by Charles Williams and was set in Alabama, USA.

== Plot ==
Sagamore Noonan lives as a recluse on an Alabama farm where he secretly brews booze. He is visited by his brother Doc Noonan and his son Billy. A young stripper, whose bikini contains her diamond jewelry, and her gangster companion come to disturb their peace.
