= Bernard Blier =

French actor (1916–1989)

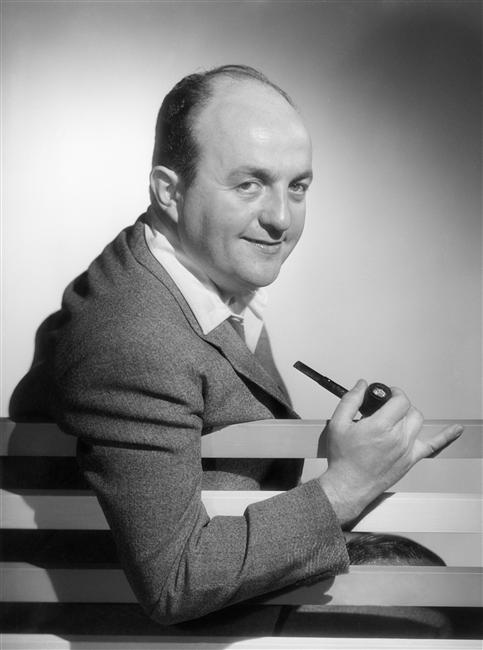
- Blier in 1951
- Born: 11 January 1916; Buenos Aires, Argentina
- Died: 29 March 1989 (aged 73); Saint-Cloud, France
- Occupation: Actor
- Years active: 1937–1989
- Spouse: Gisèle Brunet (m. 1938)
- Children: 2, including Bertrand Blier

Bernard Blier (French pronunciation: [bɛʁnaʁ blije]; 11 January 1916 – 29 March 1989) was a French character actor.

== Life and career ==
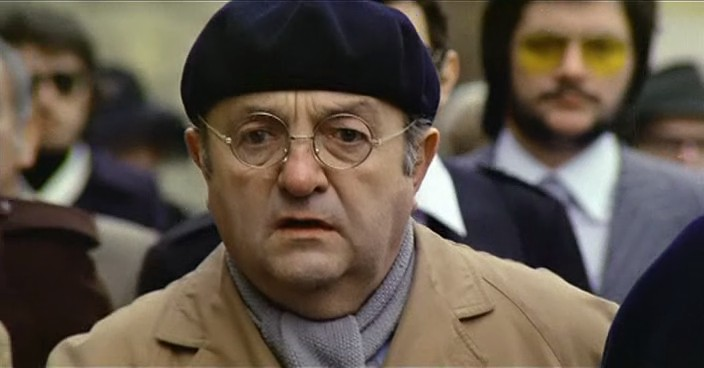
Blier in My Friends (1975).

Blier was born in Buenos Aires, Argentina, where his father, a researcher at the Pasteur Institute, was posted at the time.

His rotund features and premature baldness allowed him to often play cuckolded husbands in his early career. He is notable for being one of France's most versatile and sought-after character actors, performing interchangeably in comedies and dramas. His complete filmography includes 175 titles. He often appeared in Italian films too, particularly in the last decade of his life. He was awarded an Honorary César (the French Oscar) in 1989, 24 days before he died.

== Personal life ==
Blier was born in Buenos Aires, the son of Suzanne (Bargy) and Louis Blier. He is the father of director Bertrand Blier. He appeared in a number of his son's films, most notably Buffet froid (1979). A fictionalised version of him appears in his son's 2022 autobiographical novel Fragile des bronches.

== Filmography ==
| Year | Title | Role | Director | Notes |
|---|---|---|---|---|
| 1937 | Trois... six... neuf | | Raymond Rouleau | |
| 1937 | The Messenger | Le chauffeur de Nick | Raymond Rouleau | Uncredited |
| 1937 | Gribouille | a young man | Marc Allégret | Uncredited |
| 1937 | Double Crime in the Maginot Line | | Félix Gandéra | Uncredited |
| 1937 | Woman of Malacca | | Marc Allégret | Uncredited |
| 1937 | The Green Jacket | Le fils Pinchet | Roger Richebé | |
| 1938 | Grisou | Le fils Mélée | Maurice de Canonge | |
| 1938 | Altitude 3.200 | Benoît | Jean Benoît-Lévy and Marie Epstein | |
| 1938 | The Curtain Rises | Pescani, un élève du Conservatoire | Marc Allégret | |
| 1938 | The Gutter | Le chauffeur de taxi | Maurice Lehmann and Claude Autant-Lara | |
| 1938 | Hôtel du Nord | Prosper | Marcel Carné | |
| 1938 | Final Accord | Mérot | Ignacy Rosenkranz | |
| 1939 | Place de la Concorde | Brioche | Karel Lamač | |
| 1939 | Le Jour Se Lève | Gaston | Marcel Carné | |
| 1939 | Quartier latin | | Christian Chamborant; Pierre Colombier; Alexander Esway | Uncredited |
| 1940 | Night in December | Edouard | Curtis Bernhardt | |
| 1941 | L'enfer des anges | Freddy, la patron du bistro | Christian-Jaque | |
| 1941 | First Ball | Le maitre d'hôtel | Christian-Jaque | |
| 1941 | Who Killed Santa Claus? | a policeman | Christian-Jaque | Uncredited |
| 1941 | The Pavilion Burns | Bénézy | Jacques de Baroncelli | |
| 1942 | Caprices | Marcel | Léo Joannon | Uncredited |
| 1942 | The Woman I Loved Most | L'employé des Pompes Funèbres | Robert Vernay | |
| 1942 | La Symphonie fantastique | Antoine Charbonnel | Christian-Jaque | |
| 1942 | The Newspaper Falls at Five O'Clock | André Bertod | Georges Lacombe | |
| 1942 | Romance for Three | Marcel | Roger Richebé | |
| 1942 | La Nuit fantastique | Lucien | Marcel L'Herbier | |
| 1942 | Chiffon's Wedding | Le garçon d'hôtel | Claude Autant-Lara | |
| 1943 | Marie-Martine | Maurice | Albert Valentin | |
| 1943 | Domino | Crémone | Roger Richebé | |
| 1943 | I Am with You | Robert | Henri Decoin | |
| 1944 | Les Petites du quai aux fleurs | Le docteur Bernard | Marc Allégret | |
| 1944 | Carmen | Remendado | Christian-Jaque | |
| 1945 | Farandole | Sylvestre | André Zwoboda | |
| 1945 | Alone in the Night | Inspecteur Pascal | Christian Stengel | |
| 1946 | Monsieur Grégoire Escapes | Alex Grégoire | Jacques Daniel-Norman | |
| 1946 | Messieurs Ludovic | Ludovic Seguin | Jean-Paul Le Chanois | |
| 1947 | Clockface Café | Julien Couturier | Jean Gehret | |
| 1947 | Quai des Orfèvres | Maurice Martineau | Henri-Georges Clouzot | |
| 1948 | Man to Men | Coquillet | Christian-Jaque | |
| 1948 | Dédée d'Anvers | Monsieur René, the innkeeper | Yves Allégret | |
| 1948 | The Spice of Life | Bernard | Jean Dréville | |
| 1949 | Passion for Life | Buffle Pascal, l'instituteur | Jean-Paul Le Chanois | |
| 1949 | Return to Life | Gaston | André Cayatte | (segment 1 : "Le retour de tante Emma") |
| 1949 | Monseigneur | Louis Mennechain | Roger Richebé | |
| 1950 | Manèges | Robert | Yves Allégret | |
| 1950 | Sorceror | Jean-Pierre Lesourd | Henri Calef | |
| 1950 | Tuesday's Guest | Charles Josse | Jacques Deval | |
| 1950 | Old Boys of Saint-Loup | Jean Laclaux | Georges Lampin | |
| 1950 | Lost Souvenirs | L'agent de police Raoul | Christian-Jaque | (segment "Le violon") |
| 1950 | 1848 | Himself / narrator | Marguerite de la Mure; Victoria Mercanton. | Documentary short |
| 1951 | Without Leaving an Address | Émile Gauthier | Jean-Paul Le Chanois | |
| 1951 | La maison Bonnadieu | Félix Bonnadieu | Carlo Rim | |
| 1952 | Matrimonial Agency | Noël Pailleret | Jean-Paul Le Chanois | |
| 1952 | Je l'ai été trois fois | Henri Verdier / Hector Van Broken | Sacha Guitry | |
| 1953 | Suivez cet homme | Commissaire François Basquier | Georges Lampin | |
| 1954 | Before the Deluge | Monsieur Marcel Noblet | André Cayatte | |
| 1954 | Secrets d'alcôve | Emile Bergeret | Various directors | (segment "Lit de la Pompadour, Le") |
| 1954 | Scènes de ménage | Aglaé's husband | André Berthomieu | |
| 1955 | Black Dossier | Inspector Noblet | André Cayatte | |
| 1955 | Frou-Frou | | Augusto Genina | cameo appearance |
| 1955 | Les Hussards | Brigadier Le Gouce | Alex Joffé | |
| 1955 | Revelation | Father Lorenzo | Mario Costa | |
| 1956 | Crime and Punishment | Antoine Monestier | Georges Lampin | |
| 1957 | The Man in the Raincoat | Monsieur Raphaël | Julien Duvivier | |
| 1957 | Retour de manivelle | Inspector Plantavin | Denys de La Patellière | |
| 1957 | Send a Woman When the Devil Fails | Félix Seguin | Yves Allégret | |
| 1958 | La Bonne Tisane | René Lecomte | Hervé Bromberger | |
| 1958 | Les Misérables | Inspector Javert | Jean-Paul Le Chanois | |
| 1958 | The Cat | Capitaine Debrun | Henri Decoin | |
| 1958 | L'École des cocottes | Monsieur Labaume | Jacqueline Audry | |
| 1958 | En légitime défense | Inspector Gustave Martinet | André Berthomieu | |
| 1958 | Sans famille | Renato Garofoli | André Michel | |
| 1958 | Le Joueur | General Zagoriansky | Claude Autant-Lara | |
| 1958 | The Possessors | Simon Lachaume | Denys de La Patellière | |
| 1959 | Marie-Octobre | Julien Simoneau | Julien Duvivier | |
| 1959 | Archimède le clochard | Monsieur Pichon | Gilles Grangier | |
| 1959 | The Great War | Captain Castelli | Mario Monicelli | |
| 1959 | Le Secret du chevalier d'Éon | Baron d'Exter | Jacqueline Audry | |
| 1959 | Eyes of Love | Doctor Andrieux | Denys de La Patellière | |
| 1960 | Marche ou crève | Lenzi | Georges Lautner | |
| 1960 | L'ennemi dans l'ombre | Le Patron du contre-espionage | Charles Gérard | |
| 1960 | The Hunchback of Rome | Maresciallo | Carlo Lizzani | |
| 1960 | Crimen | the police inspector | Mario Camerini | |
| 1961 | The Fenouillard Family | Un voyageur | Yves Robert | Uncredited |
| 1961 | Arrêtez les tambours | Doctor Leproux | Georges Lautner | |
| 1961 | The President | Philippe Chalamont | Henri Verneuil | |
| 1961 | Vive Henri IV, vive l'amour | Sully | Claude Autant-Lara | |
| 1961 | Le cave se rebiffe | Charles Lepicard | Gilles Grangier | |
| 1961 | The Black Monocle | Commissaire Tournemire | Georges Lautner | |
| 1961 | The Italian Brigands | Colonel Breviglieri | Mario Camerini | |
| 1962 | Operation Gold Ingot | | Georges Lautner | |
| 1962 | Girl on the Road | Monsieur Rameau | Jacqueline Audry | |
| 1962 | The Seventh Juror | Grégoire Duval | Georges Lautner | |
| 1962 | Pourquoi Paris? | Le concierge de l'immeuble | Denys de La Patellière | |
| 1962 | Marco Polo | | Hugo Fregonese; Piero Pierotti | |
| 1963 | Mathias Sandorf | Toronthal | Georges Lampin | |
| 1963 | Les saintes-nitouches | Ribois | Pierre Montazel | |
| 1963 | Il magnifico avventuriero | Pope Clement VII | Riccardo Freda | |
| 1963 | Germinal | Hennebeau | Yves Allégret | |
| 1963 | Les Tontons flingueurs | Raoul Volfoni | Georges Lautner | |
| 1963 | The Organizer | Martinetti | Mario Monicelli | |
| 1964 | High Infidelity | Sergio | Mario Monicelli | (segment "Gente Moderna") |
| 1964 | La Bonne Soupe | Joseph | Robert Thomas | |
| 1964 | Greed in the Sun | Mitch-Mitch | Henri Verneuil | |
| 1964 | Male Hunt | Monsieur Heurtin | Édouard Molinaro | |
| 1964 | The Magnificent Cuckold | Roberto Mariotti | Antonio Pietrangeli | Various directors |
| 1964 | La Chance et l'Amour | Camille | | (segment "Une chance explosive") |
| 1964 | The Great Spy Chase | Eusebio Cafarelli | Georges Lautner | |
| 1965 | Casanova 70 | the detective | Mario Monicelli | Uncredited |
| 1965 | When the Pheasants Pass | Hyacinthe Camus | Édouard Molinaro | |
| 1965 | How to Keep the Red Lamp Burning | Monsieur Charles | Gilles Grangier; Georges Lautner | |
| 1966 | A Question of Honour | Don Léandro Sanna | Luigi Zampa | |
| 1966 | The Almost Perfect Crime | Colonel Robson | Mario Camerini | |
| 1966 | The Big Restaurant | the chief superintendent | Jacques Besnard | |
| 1966 | Ring Around the World | Lord Richard Berry | Luigi Scattini; Georges Combret | |
| 1966 | How to Seduce a Playboy | | Michael Pfleghar | |
| 1967 | An Idiot in Paris | Léon Dessertine | Serge Korber | |
| 1967 | To Commit a Murder | Commandant Rhome | Édouard Molinaro | |
| 1967 | If I Were a Spy | Doctor Lefèvre | Bertrand Blier | |
| 1967 | Du mou dans la gâchette | Nicolas Pappas | Louis Grospierre | |
| 1967 | The Stranger | the criminal defense lawyer | Luchino Visconti | |
| 1967 | Le fou du labo IV | Beauchard | Jacques Besnard | |
| 1968 | Darling Caroline | Georges Berthier | Denys de La Patellière | |
| 1968 | Coplan Saves His Skin | Mascar | Yves Boisset | |
| 1968 | Quarta parete | Andrea Brusa | Adriano Bolzoni | |
| 1968 | Leontine | Charles | Michel Audiard | |
| 1968 | Will Our Heroes Be Able to Find Their Friend Who Has Mysteriously Disappeared in Africa? | Ubaldo Palmerini | Ettore Scola | |
| 1969 | My Uncle Benjamin | the Marcquis of Cambise | Édouard Molinaro | |
| 1969 | Appelez-moi Mathilde | Charles de Blanzac, l'époux de Mathilde | Pierre Mondy | |
| 1970 | Elle boit pas, elle fume pas, elle drague pas, mais... elle cause ! | Liethard | Michel Audiard | |
| 1970 | Le Distrait | Alexandre Guiton | Pierre Richard | |
| 1971 | Le Cri du cormoran le soir au-dessus des jonques | Mr. K | Michel Audiard | |
| 1971 | Laisse aller... c'est une valse | Commissaire Caillaud | Georges Lautner | |
| 1971 | Il furto è l'anima del commercio!?... | Persicelli | Bruno Corbucci | |
| 1971 | Jo | Inspector Ducros | Jean Girault | |
| 1971 | To Catch a Spy | Webb | Dick Clement | |
| 1971 | Man of the Year | Dr. Mezzini | Marco Vicario | |
| 1972 | Le Tueur | François Tellier | Denys de La Patellière | |
| 1972 | Boccaccio | Dr. Mazzeo | Bruno Corbucci | |
| 1972 | Tout le monde il est beau, tout le monde il est gentil | Louis-Marcel Thulle | Jean Yanne | |
| 1972 | Elle cause plus... elle flingue | Le commissaire Camille Bistingo | Michel Audiard | |
| 1972 | The Tall Blond Man with One Black Shoe | Bernard Milan | Yves Robert | |
| 1973 | Moi y'en a vouloir des sous | Adrien Colbart | Jean Yanne | |
| 1973 | I Don't Know Much, But I'll Say Everything | M. Gastié-Leroy | Pierre Richard | |
| 1974 | Chinese in Paris | Le Président de la République | Jean Yanne | |
| 1974 | La Main à couper | Commissaire Moureu | Étienne Périer | |
| 1974 | By the Blood of Others (Par le sang des autres) | the mayor | Marc Simenon | |
| 1974 | Ante Up | the priest | Paolo Nuzzi | |
| 1974 | Bons baisers... à lundi | Frankie Strong Le Lion | Michel Audiard | |
| 1974 | Processo per direttissima | the judge | Lucio De Caro | |
| 1975 | C'est pas parce qu'on n'a rien à dire qu'il faut fermer sa gueule! | Phano | Jacques Besnard | |
| 1975 | Cher Victor | Anselme | Robin Davis | |
| 1975 | C'est dur pour tout le monde | Paul Tardel | Christian Gion | |
| 1975 | My Friends | Righi Niccolò | Mario Monicelli | |
| 1975 | Le faux-cul | Maxime | Roger Hanin | |
| 1976 | Calmos | Émile | Bertrand Blier | |
| 1976 | Body of My Enemy | Jean-Baptiste Liégard | Henri Verneuil | |
| 1976 | Golden Night | Commissaire Pidoux | Serge Moati | |
| 1979 | Série noire | Staplin | Alain Corneau | |
| 1979 | Buffet froid | Inspector Morvandieu | Bertrand Blier | |
| 1979 | Hypochondriac | Purgone, the doctor | Tonino Cervi | |
| 1980 | Eugenio | Grandpa Eugenio | Luigi Comencini | |
| 1981 | Passion of Love | Major Tarrasso | Ettore Scola | |
| 1981 | Pétrole! Pétrole! | Christian Gion | L'émir Abdullah | |
| 1981 | Il turno | Don Marcantonio | Tonino Cervi | |
| 1983 | La fuite en avant | Rene | Christian Zerbib | |
| 1985 | Ça n'arrive qu'à moi | M. Guilledou | Francis Perrin | |
| 1985 | Madman at War | Major Belluci | Dino Risi | |
| 1985 | The Two Lives of Mattia Pascal | Anselmo Paléari | Mario Monicelli | |
| 1985 | Amici miei – Atto III | Stefano Lenzi | Nanni Loy | |
| 1986 | Let's Hope It's a Girl | Uncle Gugo | Mario Monicelli | |
| 1986 | Je hais les acteurs | Jerome B. Cobb | Gérard Krawczyk | |
| 1986 | Twist again à Moscou | Alexei | Jean-Marie Poiré | |
| 1987 | Under the Chinese Restaurant | Il professore | Bruno Bozzetto | |
| 1987 | The Rogues | the pimp | Mario Monicelli | |
| 1988 | The Possessed | the governor | Andrzej Wajda | |
| 1988 | Ada dans la jungle | Le major Collins | Gérard Zingg | |
| 1988 | Mangeclous | Saltiel | Moshé Mizrahi | |
| 1988 | Una botta di vita | Giuseppe Mondardini | Enrico Oldoini | |
| 1989 | Paganini | Father Caffarelli | Klaus Kinski | |
| 1989 | Migrations | Opat Zorzel | Aleksandar Petrovic | |

== Honors and awards ==
Officier of the order of Legion of Honour
