= The Return of the Tall Blond Man with One Black Shoe =

- Theatrical release poster
- French: Le Retour du Grand Blond
- Directed by: Yves Robert
- Written by: Francis Veber; Yves Robert
- Produced by: Alain Poiré; Yves Robert
- Starring: Pierre Richard; Jean Carmet; Jean Rochefort; Mireille Darc
- Cinematography: René Mathelin
- Edited by: Ghislaine Desjonquères; Françoise London
- Music by: Vladimir Cosma
- Production companies: Gaumont International; La Guéville
- Distributed by: Gaumont Distribution
- Release date: 18 December 1974 (France)
- Running time: 84 minutes
- Country: France
- Language: French
- Box office: $107,502 (US)

The Return of the Tall Blond Man with One Black Shoe (French: Le Retour du Grand Blond) is a 1974 French spy comedy film directed by Yves Robert. It is the sequel to The Tall Blond Man with One Black Shoe (1972).

Writer Francis Veber said the film "wasn't good at all... I'm afraid I did it just for the money."

== Synopsis ==
Three months after the events of The Tall Blond Man with One Black Shoe, Francois Perrin, the Tall Blond Man (who has been living happily with his lover Christine in Rio de Janeiro, Brazil), is once again pressed into service.

Chief of Counter-Espionage Colonel Toulouse has a new boss—the former Minister of Agriculture has become the Minister of Interior. Captain Cambrai (who has been investigating Colonel Milan's death and who is extremely suspicious of Toulouse's involvement) intercepts a letter written by Perrin to his best friend Maurice (who has recovered from his nervous breakdown of the previous film) in which Perrin assures Maurice that he (Maurice) is not crazy and that the events causing Maurice's breakdown actually happened. When Maurice refuses to testify against Toulouse, Cambrai comes up with another plan. At Cambrai's urging, the new Minister wants to meet the supposed "super-agent". Toulouse, who can't let anybody know that the Tall Blond was really a civilian chosen at random, orders that Perrin be liquidated at once while informing the Minister and Cambrai that The Tall Blond was killed while on a mission. Attempts to assassinate Perrin in Rio are comically avoided or bungled and his funeral (held in France after a premature report of his death and with a coffin containing not enough sand) is likewise a comic failure; the Minister becomes increasingly confused by the conflicting reports and Cambrai, who had counted on the report of Perrin's death to get Maurice to testify, is equally puzzled.

Eventually, Toulouse has Christine kidnapped and forces Perrin to return to Paris to act out the part of the supposed "super-spy" for the Minister. Cambrai is not fooled and in two hilarious scenes Perrin is given embarrassing information from both Toulouse and Cambrai about each of them from their private files (Toulouse's mother had wanted a daughter and made him wear dresses as a child, causing the other boys to call him "Lollipop", and Cambrai [who acts tough and ruthless] wet his bed when he was young, really hates violence and had suffered a nervous breakdown while trying to interrogate a suspect). Toulouse orchestrates a plan to make Cambrai crack again, setting up a supposedly dangerous yet cleverly stage-managed and choreographed "mission" for The Tall Blond while he is being followed by Maurice and Cambrai (who will supposedly be unable to handle the "violence"); the plot seems to work but then Cambrai learns that Perrin's gun (which Cambrai had used to shoot and "kill" an attacking thug) was really loaded with blanks.

Believing Cambrai finished (and after yet another attempt to kill Perrin comically fails), Toulouse orders Christine to be released but when she, Toulouse and Perrache arrive at Perrin's apartment they find him in a compromising situation, in bed with his former lover Paulette (actually a set-up by Cambrai and Maurice). Rushing out in tears over Perrin's faithlessness, Christine is met outside by Cambrai and Maurice. That night, at a symphony concert at which Perrin is performing and which Toulouse, Perrache, Cambrai, the Minister and two of Toulouse's men (who have been instructed to kill Perrin during the performance) are attending, Cambrai informs Toulouse that should anything happen to Perrin, Maurice will testify, causing Toulouse to immediately call off his men. Christine appears again, in her usual dazzling clothes (a white backless dress, this time) and armed with a gun; she tries to shoot Francois on stage (in time to the music). Perrin is apparently killed and Maurice announces that he will testify. Toulouse, backed into a corner, attempts to take Christine hostage but then Perrin rises up-Christine's gun was also loaded with blanks. Toulouse, exposed in public, accepts his defeat with good grace and is allowed by Cambrai to commit suicide to avoid prison and disgrace. Of course, Toulouse (unknown to everyone else) fakes his suicide; he and Perrache make their escape. Cambrai gets punched out by Perrin and the film ends with Boy Getting Girl Back and Ending Happily Ever After (even though the Minister still has no idea what is going on).

== Cast ==
- Pierre Richard as François Perrin
- Jean Carmet as Maurice Lefebvre
- Jean Rochefort as Colonel Louis Marie Alphonse Toulouse
- Mireille Darc as Christine
- Jean Bouise as The minister
- Michel Duchaussoy as Captain Gaston Cambrai
- Paul Le Person as Perrache
- Colette Castel as Paulette Lefebvre
- Henri Guybet as Charming, a killer
- Herve Sand as Prince, a killer
