= Icy Breasts =

- French: Les seins de glace
- Directed by: Georges Lautner
- Screenplay by: Georges Lautner
- Based on: Someone Is Bleeding (1953 novel) by Richard Matheson
- Produced by: Raymond Danon; Alain Delon
- Starring: Alain Delon; Mireille Darc; Claude Brasseur
- Cinematography: Maurice Fellous
- Edited by: Michelle David
- Music by: Philippe Sarde
- Production companies: Lira Films; Belstar Productions; Capitolina Produzioni Cinematografiche
- Distributed by: Fox-Lira (France)
- Release date: 28 August 1974 (France)
- Running time: 105 minutes
- Countries: France; Italy
- Language: French
- Box office: 1,462,693 admissions (France)

Icy Breasts (French: Les seins de glace, also known as Someone Is Bleeding) is a 1974 psychological crime-thriller film written and directed by Georges Lautner, and starring Alain Delon (who also produced), Mireille Darc and Claude Brasseur. It is based on Richard Matheson's 1953 novel Someone Is Bleeding.

The film's French title is a pun on saints de glace.

== Plot ==
Peggy, a widow, meets writer François Rollin. After they meet, François tries to get romantically involved with Peggy. Peggy turns François down and eventually he stalks her to where she is shopping. François gets into Peggy's car while she was shopping. Peggy finds him in her car asks him to leave but he refuses. Peggy drops him off a few miles down the road. She ends up writing her number on her window. François gets on his motorcycle and shows up at her house. Peggy tells François about being divorced from her husband. When François leaves her home, he is followed by someone. He is asked to speak to Peggy's divorce lawyer, Marc Rilson. François finds out that Peggy killed her husband and was acquitted for the murder when her lawyer pleaded temporary insanity. Peggy becomes paranoid and kills her bodyguard. Then she ends up staying overnight with François. The following day she returns home to get her belongings. The police were there to ask her questions and took her in for questioning for the murder. She was told not to leave the city without giving notice. They leave to the Turini mountain pass, followed by Marc. Peggy is in fact mentally ill and on a stop in a hotel room, tries to kill François with a straight razor. Marc arrives and takes her with him. Later, they admire the mountain view and Marc shoots her.

== Cast ==
- Alain Delon as Marc Rilson
- Mireille Darc as Peggy
- Claude Brasseur as François Rollin
- André Falcon as Commissioner Garnier
- Nicoletta Machiavelli as Jacqueline Rilson
- Emilio Messina as Steig
- Fiore Altoviti as Denis Wilson
- Michel Peyrelon as Albert
- Jean Luisi as Innkeeper
- Philippe Castelli as Man in Carpark

== Reception ==
The film received good reviews and was a hit, grossing $250,000 in its first week in Paris. It had 1,462,693 admissions in France. It played at the second Seattle International Film Festival in 1977.
