= Mireille Darc =

French model and actress (1938-2017)

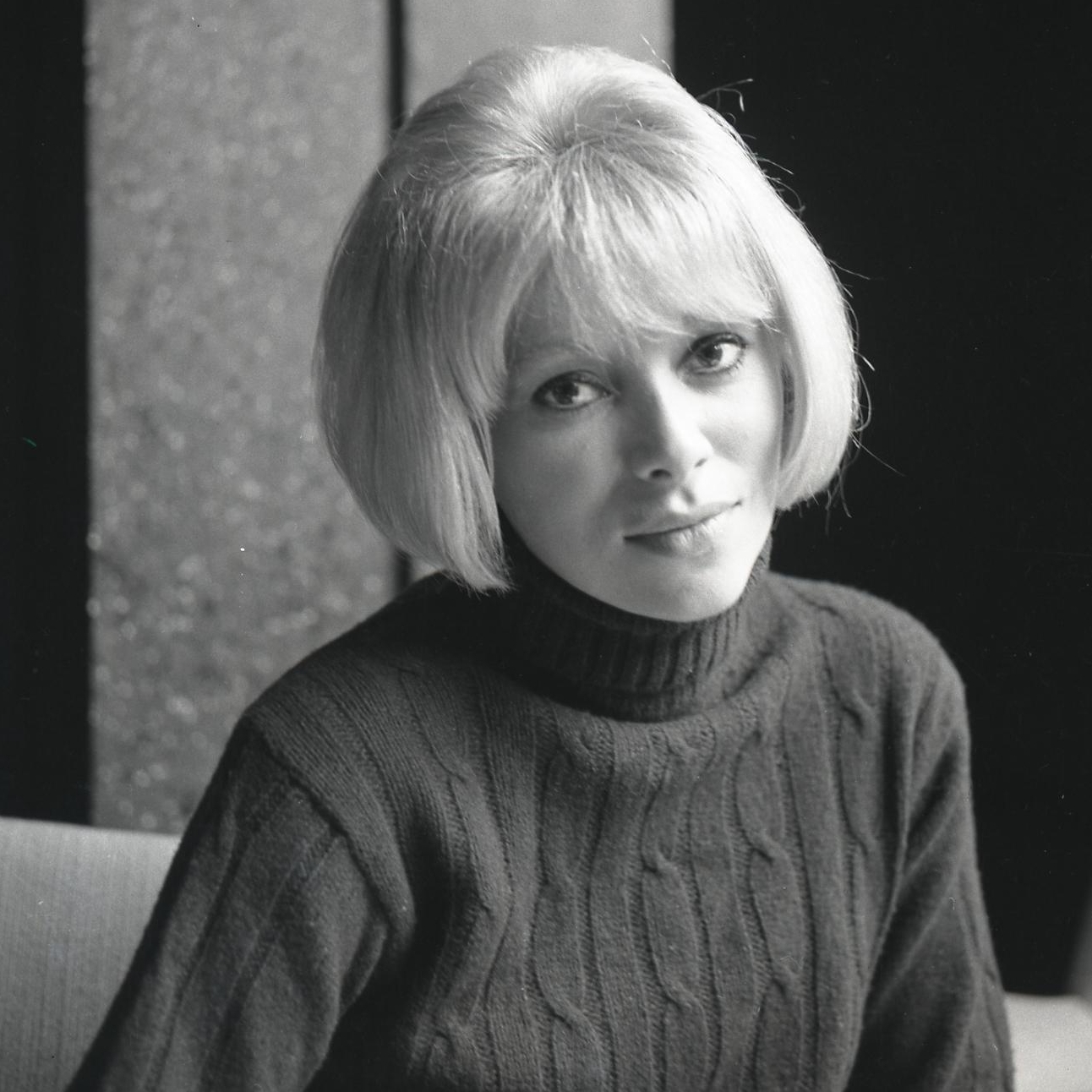
- Darc in 1968
- Born: Mireille Christiane Gabrielle Aimée Aigroz; 15 May 1938; Toulon, France
- Died: 28 August 2017 (aged 79); Paris, France
- Resting place: Montparnasse Cemetery
- Occupation: Actress
- Years active: 1960–2012
- Height: 1.72 m (5 ft 7 1/2 in)
- Spouse: Pascal Desprez (m. 1996)
- Partner: Alain Delon (1968–1983)
- Website: mireille-darc.com

Mireille Darc (French: [miʁɛj daʁk]; 15 May 1938 – 28 August 2017) was a French actress, director, photographer, singer and model. She appeared as a lead character in Jean-Luc Godard's 1967 film Weekend. Darc was a Knight of the Legion of Honour and Commander of the National Order of Merit. Alain Delon was her longtime co-star and companion.

== Early years ==
Born Mireille Christiane Gabrielle Aimée Aigroz in Toulon, she attended the Conservatory of Dramatic Arts in Toulon and moved to Paris in 1959.

== Career ==
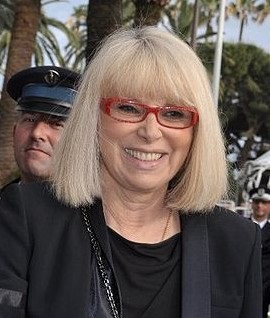
Darc in 2010

Darc's debuted in Claude Barma's television drama Du côté de l'enfer (aka, La Grande Brétèche, 1960). Her first leading role came in another production for French television, Jean Prat's Hauteclaire (1961). She starred in Jean-Luc Godard's film Weekend (Week-end, 1967) as Corinne, her highest profile role for international critics; as Christine in The Tall Blond Man with One Black Shoe (Le Grand Blond avec une chaussure noire, 1972) and The Return of the Tall Blond Man with One Black Shoe (Le retour du grand blond, 1974) and alongside Alain Delon and Louis de Funès in several films: Pouic-Pouic (1963), High Lifers (How to Keep the Red Lamp Burning (1965), Jeff (1969), Borsalino (uncredited, 1970), The Love Mates (Madly, 1970), Icy Breasts (Les Seins de glace, 1974), Death of a Corrupt Man (Mort d'un pourri, 1977), Man in a Hurry (L'Homme pressé, 1977), and the television series Frank Riva (2003).

Darc had a heart condition from childhood, which required open-heart surgery in 1980. She was seriously injured in a car accident on 7 July 1983, in a tunnel in the Aosta Valley, Italy, suffering a fractured spine and other injuries that required three months of immobilization in a hospital in Geneva, Switzerland.

Although they had recently separated about two weeks prior to the accident after a fifteen-year relationship, Delon rushed to Aosta when he heard about the accident, and left separately for Geneva by automobile during the night.

She quit her film career, but she returned to television in the 1990s. In 2006, French President Jacques Chirac awarded Darc the Legion of Honour.

== Health and death ==
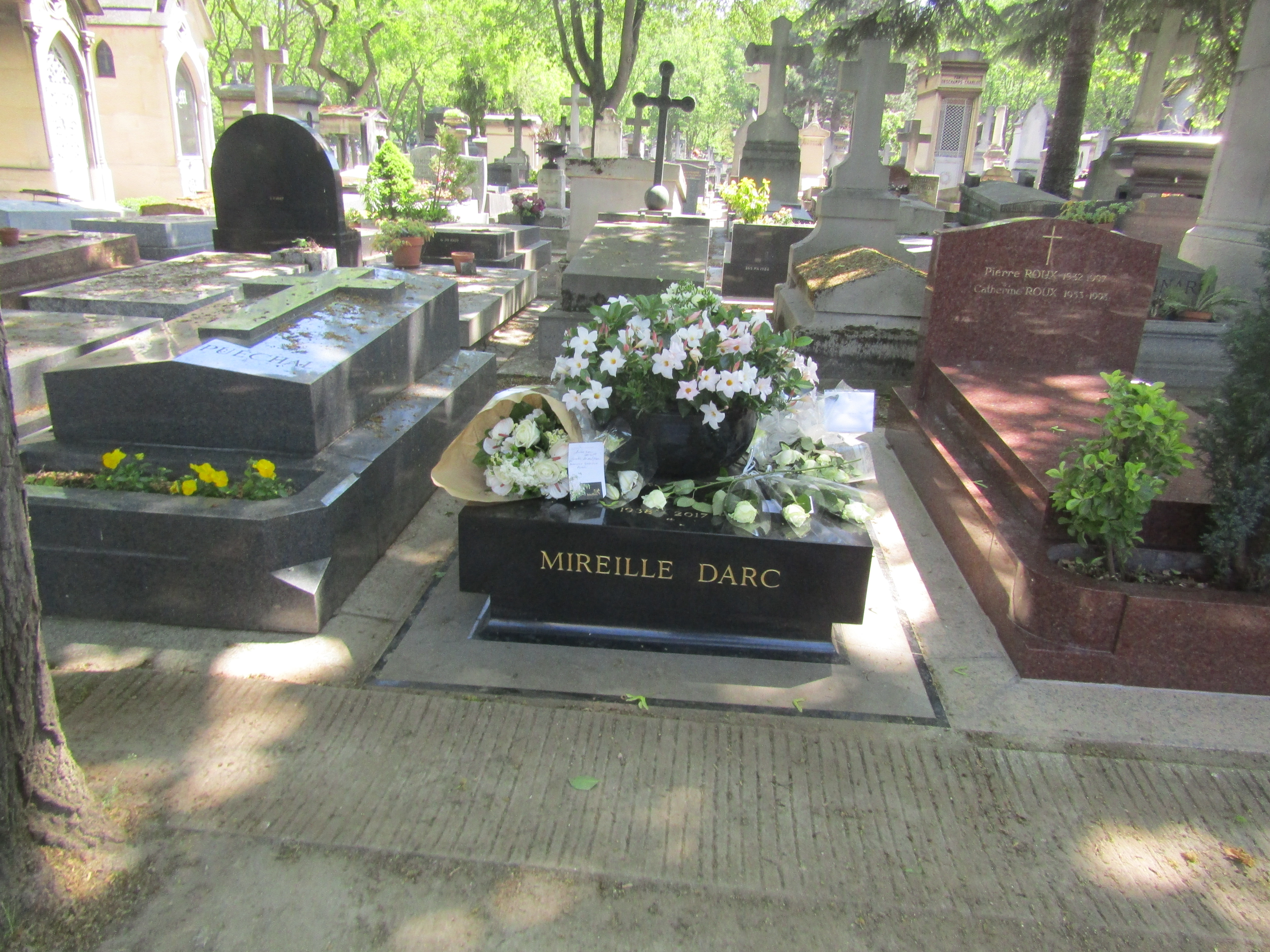
Darc's tomb in Section 11 of Montparnasse Cemetery, Paris

In 2013, Darc underwent further open heart surgery, and during 2016 she suffered several hemorrhages. She died on 28 August 2017 in Paris in a coma at the age of 79.

== Theatre ==
Year	Play	Author	Director	Theatre
2007	Sur la route de Madison	Robert James Waller	Anne Bourgeois	Théâtre Marigny
1984	Chapitre II	Neil Simon	Pierre Mondy	Théâtre Édouard VII
1965	Pieds nus dans le parc	Neil Simon	Pierre Mondy	Théâtre de la Madeleine
1964	Photo-Finish	Peter Ustinov	Peter Ustinov	Théâtre des Ambassadeurs
1962	Les Femmes aussi ont perdu la guerre	Curzio Malaparte	Raymond Gérôme	Théâtre des Mathurins

== Filmography ==
=== Feature films ===
Year	Title	Director	Role	Notes
1960	Les distractions	Jacques Dupont	Maïa	
1961	Please, Not Now!	Roger Vadim	Marie-Jeanne	
1961	Mourir d'amour	José Bénazéraf, Dany Fog	Mariette	
1961	Les Nouveaux Aristocrates	Francis Rigaud	Milou Rivoire	
1961	¿Pena de muerte?	José María Forn	Lina	
1962	The Devil and the Ten Commandments	Julien Duvivier	Une amie de Mauricette	(deleted segment "L'oeuvre de chair ne désireras qu'en mariage seulement"), Uncredited
1962	Virginie	Jean Boyer	Brigitte	
1963	People in Luck	Philippe de Broca, Jean Girault, Jack Pinoteau	Jacqueline	(segment "Le manteau de vison")
1963	Pouic-Pouic	Jean Girault	Patricia Monestier	
1964	Monsieur	Jean-Paul Le Chanois	Suzanne	
1964	Salad by the Roots	Georges Lautner	Rockie La Braise	
1964	Les Durs à cuire	Jack Pinoteau	Josette	
1964	Male Hunt	Edouard Molinaro	Georgina	
1964	The Great Spy Chase	Georges Lautner	Amaranthe	
1965	How to Keep the Red Lamp Burning	Gilles Grangier, Georges Lautner	Marie Cruchet known as "Eloise"	(segment "Bons vivants, Les")
1966	Galia	Georges Lautner	Galia	
1966	The Upper Hand	Denys de La Patellière	Lili Princesse	
1966	Balearic Caper	José María Forqué	Polly	
1966	Ne nous fâchons pas	Georges Lautner	Eglantine Michalon	
1966	Living It Up	Pierre Gaspard-Huit	Eva Ritter	
1967	La Grande Sauterelle	Georges Lautner	Salene	
1967	Casino Royale	John Huston	Jag	Uncredited
1967	The Blonde from Peking	Nicolas Gessner	Christine Olsen	
1967	Fleur d'oseille	Georges Lautner	Catherine	
1967	Weekend	Jean-Luc Godard	Corinne Durand	
1968	Summit	Giorgio Bontempi	Annie	
1969	Jeff	Jean Herman	Eva	
1969	Monte Carlo or Bust!	Ken Annakin	Marie-Claude	
1970	Elle boit pas, elle fume pas, elle drague pas, mais... elle cause !	Michel Audiard	Francine	
1970	Borsalino	Jacques Deray	Prostitute	Uncredited
1970	Madly	Roger Kahane	Agatha	
1971	Fantasia chez les ploucs	Gérard Pirès	Caroline	
1971	Laisse aller... c'est une valse	Georges Lautner	Carla	
1972	Il était une fois un flic	Georges Lautner	Christine	
1972	L'Humeur vagabonde	Édouard Luntz		
1972	Le Grand Blond avec une chaussure noire	Yves Robert	Christine	
1973	Il n'y a pas de fumée sans feu	André Cayatte	Olga Leroy	
1973	La Valise	Georges Lautner	Françoise	
1974	OK patron	Claude Vital	Mélissa	
1974	Les Seins de glace	Georges Lautner	Peggy Lister	
1974	Borsalino & Co	Jacques Deray	prostitute in the street	Uncredited
1974	Dis-moi que tu m'aimes	Michel Boisrond	Victoire Danois	
1974	Le retour du grand blond	Yves Robert	Christine	
1975	The Pink Telephone	Édouard Molinaro	Christine	
1976	L'Ordinateur des pompes funèbres	Gérard Pirès	Charlotte	
1977	The Passengers	Serge Leroy	Nicole	
1977	Man in a Hurry	Édouard Molinaro	Edwige	
1977	Mort d'un pourri	Georges Lautner	Françoise	
1978	Les Ringards	Robert Pouret	Annie Garmiche	
1981	Pour la peau d'un flic	Alain Delon	La Grande sauterelle	Uncredited
1982	Jamais avant le mariage	Daniel Ceccaldi	Elisabeth	
1983	L'Été de nos 15 ans	Marcel Jullian	Hotel customer	Uncredited
1983	Si elle dit oui... je ne dis pas non	Claude Vital	Catherine	
1984	Réveillon chez Bob	Édouard Molinaro	Madeleine	
1986	La Vie dissolue de Gérard Floque	Georges Lautner	Jocelyne Domange	

=== Short films ===
Year	Title	Director	Role
1962	Lettres de Provins	Jean Dasque	Voice only
1960	La Revenante	Jacques Poitrenaud	

=== Feature ===
Year	Title	Featuring
1989	La Barbare	Murray Head

=== Documentaries ===
Year	Title	Channel
1992	La Deuxième Vie	France 2
1996	Brève Rencontre	France 2
1996	Le Doute et L'esperance	France 3
2002	De L'ombre a La Lumière	France 3
2004	Jeunesse Éternelle	France 2
2004	Une Nuit Sous Les Mers	France 2
2005	L'ostéoporose	
2005	Une Vie Classée X	France 3
2006	Les Liserons d'Eau	France 2
2006	Vivre d'Amour	France 5
2008	Voyage Vers L'inconnue	France 2
2011	Pas Sur La Bouche	France 3
2012	Pardonner	France 2
2015	Elles sont des dizaines de milliers sans abri	France 2
2017	Excision, Le Plaisir Interdit	France 2

== French-language dubbing ==
Year	Title	Actress
1963	L’Ile aux Filles Perdues	Marisa Belli
1963	Foudres sur Babylone	Jose Greci
1962	L’Effroyable secret du Dr Hichcock	Barbara Steele
1961	Soliman le Magnifique	Georgia Moll
1961	Les Vikings Attaquent	Franca Bettoja
1961	Le Boucanier des Iles ( Il Giustiziere dei Mari )	Marisa Belli
1960	L'Esclave du Pharaon	Vira Silenti
1960	Les Légions de Cléopâtre	Linda Cristal
1960	Le Géant de Thessalie	Ziva Rodann
1960	Toryok la furie des Barbares	Ljubica Jovic
1958	La Charge des Cosaques	Georgia Moll

== Bibliography ==
- 2008: Mon Père
- 2005: Tant que battra mon coeur (Autobiography)
- 1982: Jamais avant le mariage

== Decorations ==
- Officer of the Legion of Honour (2015), (Knight in 2006)
- Commander of the National Order of Merit (2009)
