= Le Tueur (1972 film) =

- Directed by: Denys de La Patellière
- Screenplay by: Denys de La Patellière
- Story by: Denys de La Patellière
- Starring: Jean Gabin; Fabio Testi; Uschi Glas
- Cinematography: Claude Renoir
- Edited by: Claude Durand
- Music by: Hubert Giraud
- Production companies: C.O.F.C.I; Gafer; Europa Films; Mondial Te.Fi.; Rialto
- Distributed by: Prodis (France)
- Release dates: March 1, 1972 (France); August 13, 1972 (Italy); September 29, 1972 (West Germany)
- Countries: France; Italy; West Germany
- Budget: 5.3 million francs

Le Tueur (lit. 'The Killer') is a 1972 crime film directed and written by Denys de La Patellière.

== Plot ==
After successfully arresting the dangerous criminal Georges Gassot, Commissioner Le Guen argues with the new methods of the new director of criminal investigations, François Tellier. Feigning insanity, Gassot escapes from a psychiatric hospital to Marseille, where he meets the German sex worker Gerda. Through a journalist, Le Guen leads the criminal underworld to believe that Gassot is in Marseille to take over their operations; the murder of Gerda's pimp in Marseille lend credence to this story which leads Gassot to return to Paris.

Gassot begins killing anyone who gets in his way or who has betrayed him. He only keeps in touch with Gerda and his brother François. When Gassot attempts to take part in a heist, Le Guen beats him to it and turns his associates against him. Tellier tries to corner Gassot through his associate with Gerda and by using his regular brand of cigarettes. Just as Le Guen is about to arrest Gassot, he is interrupted and Gassot escapes again. Le Guen's failure to apprehend Gassot proves too much for Tellier, who believes his older methods sabotaged the plan and by turn the gangsters against Gassot. Le Guen attempts to have them carry out the death penalty that the court rejected. Tellier says to Le Guen that as he has just a few months until retirement, he will not ask him to resign, but demands he track down Gassot.

François, who makes a living from a small-time pornography scam, is caught out by a real porn film that the cops discover at just the right moment at his place. Le Guen has Tellier set up the roadblocks that Tellier had initially proposed. Le Guen doesn’t actually think these will catch him, but wants to turn up the pressure on Gassot. To ensure the killer's capture, Le Guen has Frédo, a mole, placed in François's cell to quickly gather information. With Gassot on the run, he asks Gerda to go see her brother so he can find him a hideout. François sends Frédo to meet him; who immediately returns to the Criminal Investigation Division to update them. Le Guen sets up a trap that Tellier agrees to despite his reservations. The trap is set up at a hunting lodge in the countryside. Gerda spots the police and warns Gassot, who flees and seriously wounds Campana. Surrounded by the police, he shoots himself in the mouth as Gerda, Le Guen, and Tellier look on.

== Cast ==
- Jean Gabin as Commissioner Le Guen
- Fabio Testi as Georges Gassot
- Uschi Glas as Gerda
- Jacques Richard as François Gassot
- Bernard Blier as François Tellier
- Gérard Depardieu as Frédo Babasch
- Ginette Garcin as Lulu
- Philippe Vallauris as Inspector Guérin
- Sady Rebbot as Lucien
- Jacques Debary as commissioner in Marseille
- Félix Marten as Campana

== Production ==
Le Tueur was an international co-production between France, Italy and West Germany. It was 60% funded by the Paris-based companies C.O.F.C.I, Gafer and Europa Films, 20% the Rome-based Mondial Te.Fi and 20% by the West German Rialto. The film had a budget of 5.3 million francs.

Filming lasted eight weeks between November 8, 1971 and January 3, 1972. The film would be director and screenwriter Denys de La Patellière's penultimate feature film as he would move on to directing for television for the next few decades. In the French-language version of the film, Fabio Testi is dubbed by Marc Porel.

== Release ==
Le Tueur was distributed in France by Prodis on March 1, 1972. While the film opened at the top of the box office upont its release in Paris, it had just over 900,000 spectators in France on its theatrical release.

It was released in Italy as Il commissario Le Guen e il caso Gassot (lit. 'Commissioner Le Guen and the Gassot Case') on August 13, 1972 and in West Germany as Der Killer und der Komissar on September 29, 1972.

== Reception ==
In their book French Thrillers of the 1970s: Volume I, Crime Films (2026), authors Roberto Curti and Frank Lafond said the film was "generally disappointing," finding that Jean Gabin did not give a strong performance while Fabio Testi could not hide his limits as an actor. They found that the director failed to give the story much punch. They found the highlight of the film was Claude Renoir's photography that gave the film a "drab wintery mood that perfectly suits the story" and that the film had a brief appearance of Gérard Depardieu in his fourth film role as a small-time crook.
