= The Love Mates =

- Directed by: Roger Kahane
- Written by: Mireille Aigroz; Pascal Jardin; Roger Kahane
- Produced by: Alain Delon
- Starring: Alain Delon; Mireille Darc
- Cinematography: Georges Barsky
- Edited by: Marcel Teulade
- Music by: Francis Lai
- Distributed by: Cinema International Corporation
- Release date: 1970
- Running time: 85 minutes
- Country: France
- Language: French

The Love Mates (French: Madly) is a 1970 French romance film starring Alain Delon and Mireille Darc.

The film was a financial disappointment, with admissions of 508,452 in France.

== Plot ==
Agatha is a woman so submissive to her husband Julien that she accepts his affairs. She eventually agrees to move her West Indian mistress into their home, but the peace won't last long.

== Cast ==
- Alain Delon as Julien Dandieu
- Mireille Darc as Agatha
- Jane Davenport as Madly
- Valentina Cortese as Eva
- Pascale de Boysson as Lucienne
- Maddly Bamy as Madly
- Maria Schneider
