= Jeff (1969 film) =

- Directed by: Jean Herman
- Written by: André-Georges Brunelin; Jean Cau
- Produced by: Alain Delon
- Starring: Alain Delon; Mireille Darc
- Cinematography: Jean-Jacques Tarbès
- Music by: François de Roubaix
- Production companies: Adel Productions; PECF (French); Produzione Intercontinentale Cinematografica (PIC) (Italian)
- Distributed by: Warner Bros.-Seven Arts
- Release date: 25 April 1969
- Running time: 92 minutes
- Countries: France; Italy
- Language: French
- Box office: 1,074,600 admissions (France)

Jeff is a 1969 French-Italian crime film financed by Warner Bros.-Seven Arts. Starring Alain Delon and Mireille Darc, it tells the story of a gang of thieves who fall out after a robbery and start killing each other off.

== Plot ==
In Paris, a gang rob a diamond merchant after abducting his wife and killing his chauffeur. The loot is given to Jeff, their leader, who will take it to a fence in Antwerp and then return to share out the cash proceeds. But he never returns. All of the gang believe he has cheated them, apart from Laurent who still trusts his leader. They leave one member to guard Laurent and go to Jeff's apartment, where they torture his mistress Eva.

Laurent kills his guard, rescues Eva, and sets off with her to Antwerp. There they find the fence, who says Jeff has the money. The other members find the fence, kill him, and abduct his wife, who they force to tell Eva that Jeff has cheated everybody. Laurent meanwhile has found Jeff's hideaway and kills him. Going to meet Eva, who spent the previous night with him, he finds she has been abducted by a gang member who guns him down.

== Cast ==
- Alain Delon as Laurent
- Mireille Darc as Eva
- Georges Rouquier as Jeff
- Gabriel Jabbour as Zucci
- Nathalie Nerval as Mme Grunstein
- Robert Lombard as Grunstein
- Georges Jamin as Peter
- Henry Czarniak as Lescure
- Christian Melsen as Van Hoof
- Suzanne Flon as Mrs. de Groote
- Albert Médina as Merkès
- Frédéric de Pasquale as Diamant

== Production ==
It was the first film from Delon's production company, Adel Productions. During the making of the film, Delon began a romantic relationship with Mireille Darc which lasted for fifteen years.

== Reception ==
The film was a relative disappointment at the French box office.
