= Famous Love Affairs =

1961 film

- Directed by: Michel Boisrond
- Written by: France Roche; Paul Gordeaux; Pascal Jardin; Françoise Giroud; Jacques Prévert
- Produced by: Armand Bécue
- Starring: Alain Delon; Brigitte Bardot; Jean Paul Belmondo
- Cinematography: Robert Lefebvre
- Edited by: Raymond Lamy
- Music by: Maurice Jarre
- Distributed by: Unidex
- Release date: October 31, 1961 (Premiere)
- Country: France
- Language: French
- Box office: 2,024,249 admissions (France)

Famous Love Affairs (French: Les Amours célèbres, Italian: Amori celebri) is a 1961 French-Italian anthology film starring Alain Delon, Brigitte Bardot and Jean Paul Belmondo.

== Cast ==
Lauzun

- Jean-Paul Belmondo as Lauzun
- Dany Robin as Madame de Monaco
- Philippe Noiret as King Louis XIV
- Michel Galabru as Champagne, le domestique du roi
- Guy Tréjean as Le gouverneur
- Agnès Laurent as Irène, la femme du gouverneur
- Pierre Palau as Saint-Simon
- Liliane Brousse as Madame de Montespan
- Zanie Campan as Marton
- France Anglade as Lisette

Jenny de Lacour

- Simone Signoret as Jenny de Lacour
- Pierre Vaneck as René de La Roche
- Antoine Bourseiller Gaudry, le parfumeur boiteux
- François Maistre Le commissaire Massot
- Charles Bouillaud as Un inspecteur
- Lucien Nat as Le préfet
- Colette Castel as Louise

Agnès Bernauer

- Brigitte Bardot as Agnes Bernauer
- Alain Delon as Albert III, Duke of Bavaria
- Suzanne Flon Ursula, La Margravine
- Jean-Claude Brialy Eric Torring
- Jacques Dumesnil as Hans, le bourreau
- Pierre Brasseur as Le grand duc Ernest
- Michel Etcheverry as Gaspard Bernauer, barbier, le père d'Agnès
- Hubert Noël as Eric
- Pierre Massimi as Otto
- Henri Coutet as L'homme rasé
- Maurice Chevit as Un chevalier envoyé du Gurthenberg
- Paul Amiot as L'autre chevalier envoyé du Gurthengerg
- Jacques Monod as Preissing
- Constantin Andrieux as Karl
- Bernard Musson as Un inquisiteur

Les comédiennes

- Edwige Feuillère as Madame Raucourt
- Annie Girardot as Madame Duchesnois
- Jean Desailly as Baron Adrien de Jonchère
- Pierre Dux as Talma
- Marie Laforêt as Madame Georges
- Daniel Ceccaldi as Antonio Villa
- Jean Ozenne as Le marquis Stanislas
- Héléna Manson as the duchess
- Hélène Duc as Une marquise
- Robert Lombard as Un admirateur de Madame Raucourt

== Release ==
The film had its premiere on 31 October 1961 at the Paris Theater in New York City. Variety called it "sketchy and skimpy."
