= Le Battant =

- Directed by: Alain Delon
- Written by: Christopher Frank; Alain Delon
- Story by: André Caroff
- Produced by: Pierre Roitfeld
- Starring: Alain Delon; François Périer
- Cinematography: Jean Tournier
- Edited by: Michel Lewin
- Music by: Christian Dorisse
- Distributed by: AMLF
- Release date: 1983
- Running time: 122 minutes
- Country: France
- Language: French

Le Battant is a 1983 French crime thriller film starring and directed by Alain Delon.

It recorded admissions of 1,935,094 in France.

== Plot ==
Jacques Darnay is released from prison after eight years and tries to recover a cache of stolen diamonds. He is confronted in his quest by both the police and rival criminals.

== Cast ==
- Alain Delon as Jacques Darnay
- François Périer as Gino Ruggieri
- Pierre Mondy as Rouxel
- Anne Parillaud as Nathalie
- Andréa Ferréol as Sylviane Chabry
- Marie-Christine Descouard as Clarisse
- Michel Beaune as Pierre Mignot
- Gérard Hérold as Sauvat
- Jean-François Garreaud as Pradier
- Richard Anconina as Samatan
- Philippe Castelli as Nestor

== Reception ==
The film had 1,935,094 admissions in France and ranked 31st in the year of 1983.

Roy Armes wrote that "the limply written plot... never begins to create the requisite suspense and the wooden narcissism of the producer-star... merely serves as a reminder of how much livelier French cinema was before its stars achieved their present predominance."
