= To Kill a Cop =

- French: Pour la peau d'un flic
- Directed by: Alain Delon
- Screenplay by: Alain Delon; Christopher Frank
- Based on: Que d'os! by Jean-Patrick Manchette
- Produced by: Alain Delon
- Starring: Alain Delon; Anne Parillaud
- Cinematography: Jean Tournier
- Edited by: Michel Lewin
- Distributed by: Europe 1 UGC Distribution
- Release date: 1981
- Running time: 107 minutes
- Country: France
- Language: French
- Box office: $17.8 million

To Kill a Cop (French: Pour la peau d'un flic) is a 1981 French crime-thriller film starring and directed by Alain Delon. It was Delon's directorial debut.

It had admissions of 2,377,084 in France.

== Plot ==
Choucas, a former police detective, is commissioned by an elderly lady to investigate the disappearance of her blind daughter, Marthe. The lady is murdered. Assisted by retired commissioner Haymann, and by secretary Charlotte, investigator Choucas attempts to unravel the thread of a fraud involving various police services and drug traffickers. During the investigation Choucas is attacked in the apartment of the victim by a certain Pradier; he kills him but his accomplice manages to escape. Back home, Choucas escapes an ambush tended by a certain commissioner Madrier and kills him, with the result of ending up in the viewfinder not only of a mysterious gang, but also of the police.

The story proceeds with a succession of events, including the kidnapping of Charlotte, saved at the last minute by her employer. Choucas will discover that he was maneuvered by the police commissioner Coccioli against his dishonest colleagues, and will risk to leave his life in an attempt to discover the truth and to strip the gang: it will be saved in extremis by policemen.

== Cast ==
- Alain Delon as Choucas
- Anne Parillaud as Charlotte
- Michel Auclair as Haymann / Tarpon
- Daniel Ceccaldi as Commissioner Coccioli
- Jean-Pierre Darras as Commissioner Chauffard
- Xavier Depraz as Kasper
- Jacques Rispal as Professor Bachhoffer
- Gérard Hérold as Pradier
- Pierre Belot as Jude
- Annick Alane as Isabelle Pigot
- Pascale Roberts as Renée Mouzon
- Michel Berreur as Pérez
- Philippe Castelli as Jean le barman
- Claire Nadeau as The TV presenter
- Brigitte Lahaie as The Nurse
- Dominique Zardi as Le petit chauve
- Henri Attal as Le type au flipper
- Mireille Darc as La Grande sauterelle
