= Death of a Corrupt Man =

1977 film

- French film poster
- Directed by: Georges Lautner
- Written by: Raf Vallet (novel); Michel Audiard
- Produced by: Alain Delon; Norbert Saada
- Starring: Alain Delon
- Cinematography: Henri Decaë
- Edited by: Michelle David
- Music by: Philippe Sarde
- Distributed by: Cinema International Corporation
- Release date: 7 December 1977
- Running time: 120 minutes
- Country: France
- Language: French
- Box office: 1.8 million admissions (France)

Death of a Corrupt Man (French: Mort d'un pourri), also known as The Twisted Detective, Death of a Swine and To Kill a Rat, is a 1977 French political thriller directed by Georges Lautner and starring Alain Delon. The film is based on the novel by Raf Vallet.

== Plot ==
MP Philippe Dubaye wakes up his friend Xavier "Xav" Maréchal and reveals that he has just killed Serrano, a colleague from the National Assembly. Serrano had been demanding Dubaye's resignation, threatening to expose his corruption to the press; he possessed a notebook documenting corrupt acts involving various political figures. After killing Serrano, Dubaye seized the notebook to hide it.

At Dubaye's request, Xavier Maréchal retrieves the dossier and hides it in a locker at the RER station in the La Défense business district. He meets Valérie Agostinelli, Philippe Dubaye's former mistress. Dubaye is subsequently murdered.

The police investigate the murder, while others—some well-intentioned, others not—seek to get their hands on the infamous notebook. Everyone tries to win Xavier Maréchal over, using tactics ranging from the subtle to the overt: intimidation, bribery, and even the ransacking of his apartment. Following the murder of Christiane Dubaye—his slain friend's wife—Maréchal leaks parts of the dossier to the press, thereby compromising certain politicians.

During a hunting trip in Sologne—on the way to which he narrowly escapes hitmen after a high-speed truck chase—he confronts a mysterious businessman named Nicolas Tomski, who aggressively pressures him to hand over the notebook. Yet Maréchal withstands all pressure and threats of reprisal or death, driven by interest in a single name: that of the person who murdered his friend, MP Dubaye.

Ultimately, he learns the culprit's identity from Fondari, a crooked businessman; the name is revealed in the final scene, which takes place at the La Défense RER station.

== Cast ==
- Alain Delon as Xavier 'Xav' Maréchal
- Ornella Muti as Valérie
- Stéphane Audran as Christiane
- Mireille Darc as Françoise
- Maurice Ronet as Philippe Dubaye
- Michel Aumont as Commissaire Moreau
- Jean Bouise as Commissaire Pernais
- Daniel Ceccaldi as Lucien Lacor
- Julien Guiomar as Fondari
- Klaus Kinski as Nicolas Tomski
- François Chaumette as Lansac
- Xavier Depraz as Marcel
- Henri Virlojeux as Paul
- Colette Duval as La secrétaire de Serrano
- Carole Lange (a.k.a. Carole Achache) as La fille du vestiaire
- El Kebir as Kébir
- Gérard Hérold as Dupaire

== Musical score and soundtrack ==
Mort d'un Pourri

Soundtrack album by Philippe Sarde with Stan Getz and the London Symphony Orchestra
- Released: 1977
- Recorded: 20 October 1977; CTS Wembley, London
- Genre: Film score
- Length: 49:34
- Labels: Melba; LDA 20314

Stan Getz chronology
Another World (1977)	Mort d'un Pourri (1977)	Children of the World (1978)

Professional ratings
Review scores
Source	Rating
Allmusic	3/5 stars

The film score was composed and arranged by Philippe Sarde and features saxophonist Stan Getz fronting the London Symphony Orchestra and the soundtrack album was first released on the French Melba label.

Allmusic's Yuri German noted, "Film director Georges Lautner, who worked with Philippe Sarde on a dozen films, said that he was always impressed by the composer's ability to find an original musical approach to each picture. This time, Sarde, who always closely follows the editing process, suggested that they needed a strong soloist, preferably a tenor saxophone player, who would serve as a musical counterpart for the actor Alain Delon's famous good looks. Being a perfectionist, he opted for Stan Getz, one of the all-time great tenor saxophonists. Watching Getz's performance, Lautner decided to find a way to put the musician in the picture. He filmed Getz playing the opening theme, "Paris, Cinq Heures du Matin", solo, and it's the saxophonist's silhouette that appears during the credits sequence in the beginning of the film... The soundtrack turned out to be costly, but the director was pleased with the outcome. Sarde's instincts were right—Getz's saxophone gave the soundtrack a lyrical, nostalgic quality—fitting for Alain Delon's quest in the film for the sake of the past, to honor the memory of his dead friend".

=== Track listing ===
All compositions by Philippe Sarde.

1. "Paris, 5 H Du Matin" - 2:38
2. "Souvenirs" - 2:05
3. "Valérie" - 1:35
4. "Les Camions" - 1:30
5. "L'Attente" - 1:17
6. "Getz O Mania" - 3:07
7. "Mort d'un Pourri" - 5:30
8. "Montparnasse" - 3:37
9. "Cafeteria" - 1:23
10. "Les Aveux" - 1:08
11. "Rocquencourt" - 1:50
12. "Tout est Tranquille" - 1:50

=== Personnel ===
- Stan Getz - tenor saxophone
- Andy LaVerne - piano
- Marcel Azzola - bandoneon
- Rick Laird - bass
- Billy Hart - drums
- Efrain Toro - percussion
- London Symphony Orchestra conducted by Carlo Savina
