= Borsalino & Co. =

1974 French film by Jacques Deray

Borsalino and Co.
- Film poster
- Directed by: Jacques Deray
- Written by: Pascal Jardin; Jacques Deray
- Produced by: Alain Delon
- Starring: Alain Delon; Riccardo Cucciolla; Daniel Ivernel; Reinhard Kolldehoff
- Cinematography: Jean-Jacques Tarbès
- Edited by: Henri Lanoë
- Music by: Claude Bolling
- Production companies: Adel Productions; Comacico; Medusa Produzione; TIT Film-produktion
- Distributed by: Compagnie Internationale Cinématographique
- Release dates: 23 October 1974 (France); 29 November 1974 (West Germany); 19 December 1974 (Italy)
- Running time: 110 minutes
- Countries: France; Italy; West Germany
- Language: French
- Box office: 1,698,380 admissions (France)

Borsalino & Co. is a 1974 crime film directed by Jacques Deray and starring Alain Delon, Riccardo Cucciolla and Daniel Ivernel. It is the sequel to the film Borsalino (1970), following the criminal Siffredi as he searches Marseille for the gang that murdered his friend Capella.

The film was a French, Italian and West German co-production, produced by Delon. It was released in France on 23 October 1974. Borsalino & Co. was the 21st highest grossing film in the country for at the year-end box office in 1974, but was not nearly as popular at the box office as the first 1970 film.

== Plot ==
Siffredi, a prominent gangster in 1934 Marseille, learns that the murder of his associate and closest friend Capella was ordered by a new arrival in the city, Volpone. In revenge, he kills Volpone's brother by throwing him from a moving train. A gang war ensues. Volpone's men win, capturing Siffredi and putting his mistress Lola in a brothel. Siffredi is humiliated by the gang by turning him into an alcoholic wreck who is shut up in a psychiatric hospital. Rescued by the only other survivor of his gang, he escapes by boat to Italy. Left supreme in Marseille, Volpone is backed by the government of Nazi Germany and has the police in his pocket.

Three years later, Siffredi has recovered his health, made some money and assembled a new gang. Returning to Marseille, they free Lola from the brothel and in a new war eliminate most of Volpone's men. Capturing Volpone's right-hand man together with the police commissioner who kowtows to him, Siffredi makes the two roaring drunk and calls in journalists to publicise the shameful spectacle. A new police commissioner decides to let Siffredi finish the job. When Volpone tries to flee to Germany, Siffredi captures him on the train and stuffs him into the firebox of the locomotive. Not wanting to start again in Marseille, he takes a ship for the United States with Lola and his gang.

== Cast ==
- Alain Delon as Roch Siffredi
- Riccardo Cucciolla as Volpone
- Daniel Ivernel as Inspector Fanti
- Reinhard Kolldehoff as Sam
- André Falcon as Inspector Cazenave
- Lionel Vitrant as Fernand
- Adolfo Lastretti as Luciano
- Greg Germain as Le 'Nègre'
- Pierre Koulak as Spada
- Marius Laurey as Teissere
- Serge Davri as Charlie
- Günter Meisner as the doctor
- Jacques Debary as the Prefect of Police
- Djéloul Beghoura as Lucien
- Bruno Balp as a spectator
- Catherine Rouvel as Lola
- Anton Diffring as a German
- Mireille Darc

== Production ==
Borsalino & Co. is a sequel to Borsalino (1970). Among the crew returning from the first film are composer Claude Bolling. Jean-Paul Belmondo does not return because his character died at the end of Borsalino. A photo of his character is seen above a coffin at the beginning of this film.

Filming took place from 29 March to 25 June 1974.

Borsalino & Co. was a French, West German and Italian co-production, made by two Paris-based companies (Adel Productions and Comacico), the Rome-based Medusa Produzione, and the Munich-based TIT Film-produktion.

== Release ==
Borsalino and Co. was released in France on 23 October 1974. The film was not as popular as the original, with a third of the spectators of the original film. It had 1,698,390 spectators in France and was the 21st highest grossing film in the country for at the year-end box office in 1974. While the ending of the film ends with the line "To be continued", a sequel was never made.

It was released in West Germany on 29 November 1974 and in Italy on 19 December. When it was released in the United Kingdom on 29 October 1976 it was retitled Blood on the Streets. The film was released on DVD as Borsalino and Co. by Kino Lorber on August 16, 2005.

== See also ==
- List of crime films of the 1970s
- List of French films of 1974
