= Raymond Danon =

French film producer (1930–2018)

- Born: 14 April 1930; Paris, France
- Died: 10 October 2018 (aged 88); Paris, France
- Occupation: Film producer
- Years active: 1963–2018

Raymond Danon (14 April 1930 – 10 October 2018) was a French film producer. He produced 61 films beginning in 1963.

== Selected filmography ==
- Maigret Sees Red (1963)
- Monsieur (1964)
- The Gorillas (1964)
- Black Sun (1966)
- The Gardener of Argenteuil (1966)
- Les Grandes Vacances (1967)
- The Lady in the Car with Glasses and a Gun (1970)
- Le Chat (1971)
- Macédoine (1971)
- Someone Behind the Door (1971)
- Liza (1972)
- The Old Maid (1972)
- The Clockmaker (1974)
- Le Sauvage (1975)
- The Judge and the Assassin (1976)
- S.A.S. à San Salvador (1983)
