= Denys de La Patellière =

French film director

- Born: 8 March 1921; Nantes, France
- Died: 21 July 2013 (aged 92); Dinard, France
- Occupations: Film director, Scriptwriter
- Years active: 1955-1995

Denys de La Patellière (8 March 1921 in Nantes, France – 21 July 2013) was a French film director and scriptwriter. He also directed Television series.

He died in 2013 at the age of 92.

== Biography ==
The son of an officer, Denys de La Patellière was preparing for the entrance exam to the Military School of Saint-Cyr. During World War II, he enlisted in the Liberation Army. At the end of the conflict, he made a career in cinema. His brother-in-law, who worked for the Cinema Organizing Committee, helped him enter the Buttes-Chaumont laboratory as a cinematographic developer worker. Subsequently, he became an editor for the news journal of the press company Les Actualités françaises.

== Filmography as director ==
- 1955 : The Aristocrats, with Pierre Fresnay
- 1956 : The Wages of Sin, with Danielle Darrieux, Jean-Claude Pascal, Jeanne Moreau
- 1957 : The Ostrich Has Two Eggs, with Pierre Fresnay
- 1957 : Retour de manivelle, with Michèle Morgan, Daniel Gélin, Peter van Eyck, Bernard Blier
- 1958 : The Possessors, with Jean Gabin, Jean Desailly, Pierre Brasseur, Bernard Blier
- 1959 : Rue des prairies, with Jean Gabin, Marie-José Nat, Claude Brasseur
- 1959 : Eyes of Love, with Danielle Darrieux and Jean-Claude Brialy
- 1961 : Taxi for Tobruk, with Lino Ventura, Charles Aznavour, Hardy Krüger and Maurice Biraud
- 1962 : Emile's Boat, with Lino Ventura, Annie Girardot, Michel Simon and Pierre Brasseur
- 1963 : Destination Rome, with Charles Aznavour, Serena Vergano and Marisa Merlini
- 1964 : God's Thunder, with Jean Gabin, Lilli Palmer, Michèle Mercier, Robert Hossein
- 1964 : Marco the Magnificent, with Horst Buchholz, Anthony Quinn, Orson Welles, Omar Sharif, Elsa Martinelli, Akim Tamiroff
- 1966 : The Upper Hand, with Jean Gabin, George Raft, Gert Fröbe, Nadja Tiller, Mireille Darc
- 1966 : Father's Trip, with Fernandel
- 1966 : Black Sun, with Daniel Gélin, Michèle Mercier, Valentina Cortese
- 1968 : Darling Caroline, with France Anglade, Vittorio De Sica, Bernard Blier, Charles Aznavour, Gert Fröbe, Jean-Claude Brialy, Karin Dor
- 1968 : Le tatoué, with Jean Gabin and Louis de Funès
- 1972 : Le Tueur, with Jean Gabin, Fabio Testi, Bernard Blier, Gérard Depardieu
- 1973 : Forbidden Priests, with Robert Hossein, Claude Jade
- 1980 : Le Comte de Monte-Cristo, with Jacques Weber (TV)
- 1990 : Paparoff se dédouble, with Michel Constantin, Pascale Petit (TV)
- 1992 : Diamond Swords, with Caroline Goodall, Jason Flemyng

== Filmography as scenarist ==
- La Tour, prends garde ! (1958)
