= Delon family =

French family associated with cinema

- Country: France; Switzerland (from 1999)
- Place of origin: Saint-Vincent-Lespinasse, Tarn-et-Garonne
- Members: Alain Delon; Nathalie Delon (by marriage); Anthony Delon; Anouchka Delon; Alain-Fabien Delon; Ari Boulogne (putative son)
- Distinctions: Film actors; Alain Delon: César Award for Best Actor (1985), Honorary Palme d'Or (2019)

The Delon family is a French family from Tarn-et-Garonne in south-western France, associated since the mid-twentieth century with the film industry through the actor Alain Delon (1935–2024), regarded as one of the most prominent figures of French cinema. Its members include Delon's former wife, the actress Nathalie Delon (born Francine Canovas), his three legally recognised children, Anthony, Anouchka and Alain-Fabien, and their own children, Delon's grandchildren. Alain Delon's ancestry combined French, Italian and Swiss-born forebears, and he acquired Swiss citizenship in 1999.

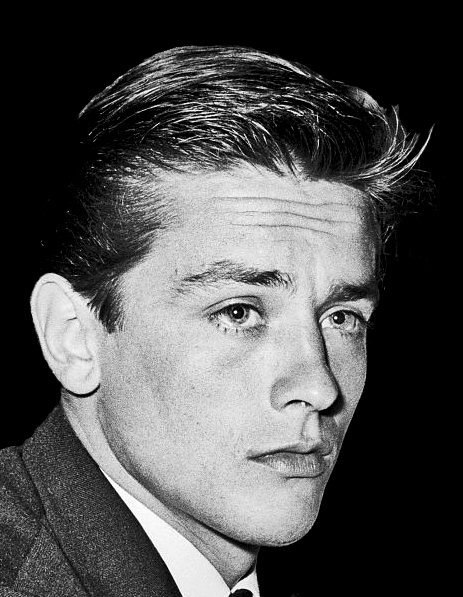
Alain Delon (1961)

The family has also attracted sustained public attention because of a long-running dispute over whether Ari Boulogne (1962–2023), the son of the German singer Nico, who was raised by Alain Delon's mother and is frequently described in the press as Delon's "illegitimate son", was Delon's biological child. Delon consistently denied paternity. No DNA test was ever carried out, and in September 2025 the court of appeal of Poitiers ruled that a paternity action pursued by Boulogne's children was time-barred.

== History ==
=== Origins ===
The Delons are reported to be originally from Saint-Vincent-Lespinasse in Tarn-et-Garonne, in south-western France. Alain Delon's paternal great-grandfather, the civil engineer Fabien Delon (1829-1909), was made a member of the Legion of Honour in 1892. His son Jean-Marcel Delon (1856-1926), a tax collector, married Maria Antonietta Evangelista (born 1867), a native of Cassino in Italy, on 3 December 1888; the couple had two children, François Fabien and Jeanne Lucidora Adèle.

On the maternal side, Alain Delon's grandfather Alfred Louis Arnold (1876-1959) was born in Paris and served as a soldier and gendarme. His parents were Just Arnold, a shoemaker born in 1847 in Bürglen, Uri, Switzerland, and Marie-Adèle Lienemann, a cook. Alfred married Maria Minard (1881-1913), a model for the couturière Jeanne Lanvin; they had two children, Édith Marie Suzanne Arnold and Henri Arnold.

=== Family disputes ===
In July 2023 Alain Delon's three recognised children lodged a complaint against Hiromi Rollin alleging psychological harassment and other offences, which she disputed; prosecutors later dropped the complaints on both sides for insufficiently established offences. In January 2024 Delon announced a complaint against Anthony following a magasine interview, amid a public disagreement among the siblings over their father's health, and in April 2024 a court placed Alain Delon under reinforced guardianship (curatelle renforcée). Following, Alain Delon's death, press reports in September 2025 said that Alain-Fabien Delon had begun proceedings against Anthony and Anouchka seeking to annul their father's will.

== Family tree ==
Simplified genealogical chart of the Delon family

Jean-Marcel Delon (1856–1926)	Maria Antonietta Evangelista (b. 1867)	Alfred Louis Arnold (1876–1959)	Maria Minard (1881–1913)
François Fabien Delon (1904–1977)	Édith Arnold (1911–1995) Adopted Ari Boulogne	Paul Boulogne (Édith's second husband)
Nathalie Delon (1938–2021) m. 1964; div. 1969	Alain Delon (1935–2024)	Rosalie van Breemen partner 1987–2001
Marie-Hélène Le Borges (Anthony's partner, 1980s)	Anthony Delon (b. 1964) mother: Nathalie Delon	Sophie Clerico (Anthony's ex-wife)	Ari Boulogne (1962–2023) putative son mother: Nico	Véronique (Ari's partner)	Anouchka Delon (b. 1990) mother: Rosalie van Breemen	Julien Dereims (m. 2021)	Alain-Fabien Delon (b. 1994) mother: Rosalie van Breemen	Laura Bensadoun (Alain-Fabien's partner)
Alyson Le Borges (b. 1986)	Lou (b. 1996)	Liv (b. 2001)	Charles Boulogne (b. 1999) putative grandson	Blanche Boulogne putative granddaughter	Lino (b. 2020)	Romy (b. 2025)

Key
Earlier generations
Alain Delon, his legally recognised children and grand-children
Spouses and partners
Unfathered branches

== Members ==
=== Parents of Alain Delon ===
Alain Delon's father, François Fabien Delon (1904–1977), was a cinema projectionist who later became director of the Le Régina cinema in Bourg-la-Reine; his mother, Édith Arnold (1911–1995), worked as an assistant in a pharmacy and as an usher at the same cinema, where the couple met. They divorced in 1939, and both remarried. Édith's second husband, Paul Boulogne, was a charcutier (pork butcher) in Bourg-la-Reine. Alain Delon was placed with a foster family and later in Catholic boarding schools, before working in his stepfather's delicatessen as a young man.

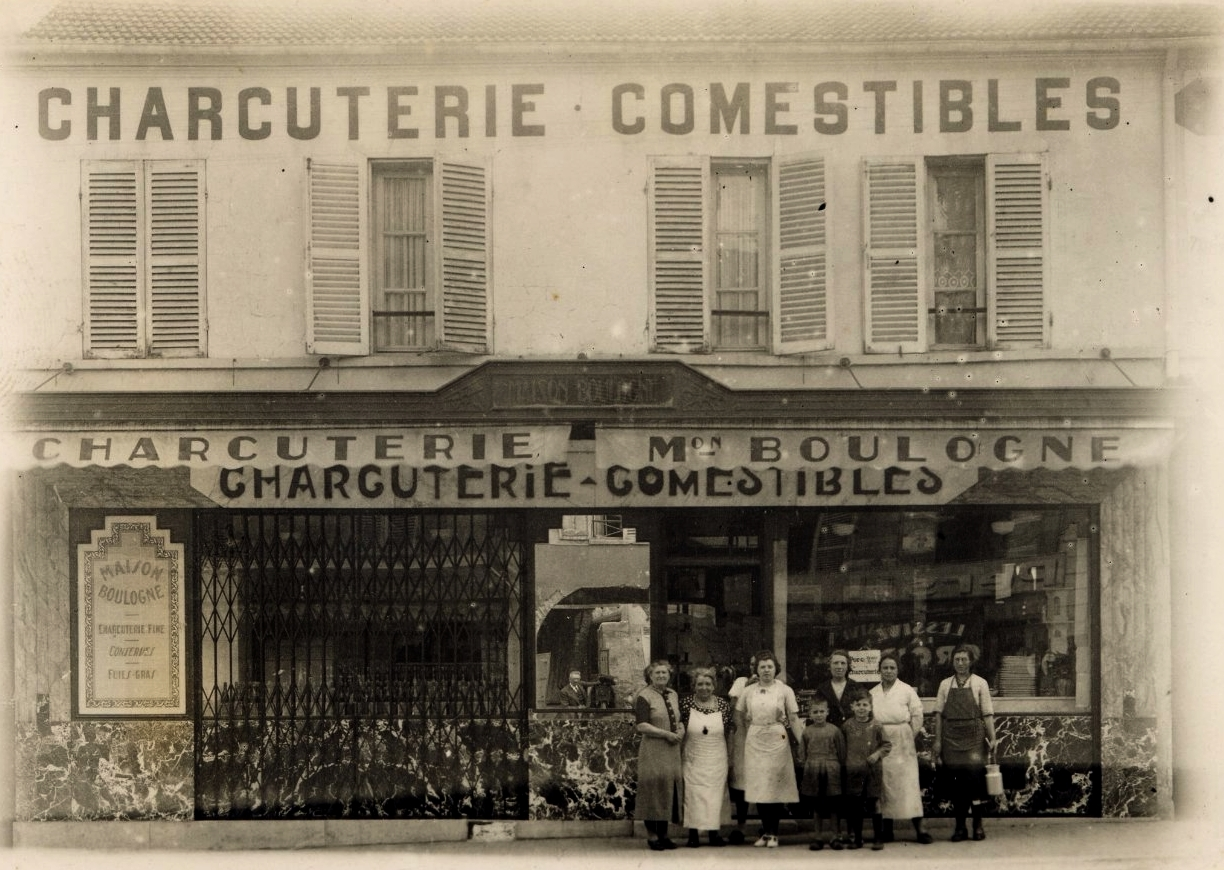
Paul Boulogne's shop in Bourg-la-Reine with Alain Delon as a child on the left (1940)

=== Alain Delon ===
Alain Fabien Maurice Marcel Delon was born in Sceaux on 8 November 1935. After service in the French Navy, he began his film career in the late 1950s and became known internationally for roles in films such as Purple Noon (1960), Rocco and His Brothers (1960), The Leopard (1963) and Le Samouraï (1967). He won the César Award for Best Actor in 1985 for Notre histoire and received an honorary Palme d'Or at the 2019 Cannes Film Festival. He took Swiss citizenship in 1999.

Delon died on 18 August 2024 at his home in Douchy, aged 88, and was buried on 24 August in a private chapel on the grounds of his estate.

=== Partners and recognised children ===
Delon was engaged to the actress Romy Schneider in 1959; their relationship, which attracted considerable press attention, ended in the early 1960s. He married Francine Canovas, known as Nathalie Delon, on 13 August 1964; their son Anthony was born on 30 September 1964 in Los Angeles. The couple divorced on 14 February 1969. Nathalie Delon died in January 2021. From 1968 to 1983 Delon lived with the actress Mireille Darc.

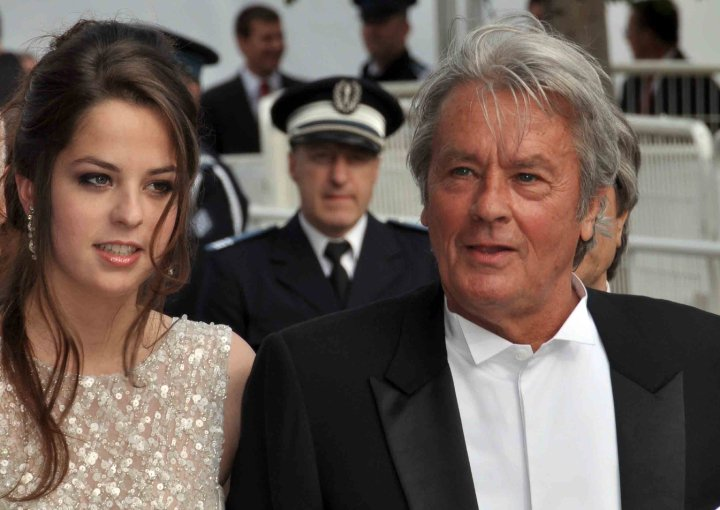
Alain and his daughter Anouchka Delon in Cannes (2010)

In 1987 Delon met the Dutch model Rosalie van Breemen; they had two children, Anouchka (born 25 November 1990) and Alain-Fabien (born 18 March 1994), and separated in 2001. Anouchka Delon presented her father with his honorary Palme d'Or at the 2019 Cannes Film Festival. Alain-Fabien Delon has worked as a model and actor, appearing in a campaign for the fashion house Dior Homme. Anthony Delon published a memoir, Entre chien et loup, in 2022.

In 2021 Delon told Paris Match that he had a Japanese companion, Hiromi Rollin; relations with her later became the subject of legal complaints.

=== Ari Boulogne and the contested filiation ===
==== Background ====
Ari Boulogne, (Note: Press outlets frequently describe Boulogne as Alain Delon's "illegitimate son" (fils illégitime), while news agencies such as AFP generally use "presumed" or "putative" son. This article follows the latter usage, because paternity was never legally established.) born Christian Aaron Päffgen on 11 August 1962, was the son of the German singer, model and actress Nico (Christa Päffgen, 1938–1988), who died in Ibiza after a cycling accident. Nico maintained throughout her life that Alain Delon was the child's father; Delon acknowledged a brief relationship with her but denied paternity. Delon later described the physical resemblance between himself and Boulogne as a coincidence.

Ari Boulogne spent his earliest years in Ibiza with his maternal grandmother. In 1967 Delon's mother, Édith Boulogne, brought the five-year-old to France and raised him in Bourg-la-Reine; from 1968 he attended a Catholic boarding school at Montfort-l'Amaury. In 1977 he was adopted by Édith's husband, Paul Boulogne, which changed his surname and nationality to French. Édith Boulogne later stated that she was certain that he was her son's child, a position reported to have caused a lasting estrangement between her and Alain Delon.

As a child Ari Boulogne appeared alongside his mother in Andy Warhol's Chelsea Girls (1966), and later in films by Philippe Garrel, including La Cicatrice intérieure (1972). He met Alain Delon only on a few occasions as an adult. In 2001 he published an autobiography, L'Amour n'oublie jamais (Éditions Pauvert), in which he maintained that he was Delon's son.

==== Legal proceedings ====
Principal stages of the legal dispute
Date	Event	Source
During Boulogne's childhood	A recognition request made by Nico on her son's behalf is unsuccessful.	
2001	Boulogne learns that his own attempt to obtain recognition has also failed.	
2019	Boulogne brings a new paternity action against Delon. His lawyer states that the aim is to preserve his children's filiation link.	
27 August 2020	The court declares French courts territorially incompetent, Delon being resident in Switzerland.	
29 September 2021	The Orléans court of appeal reaches the same conclusion, Delon being a Swiss resident and national. Boulogne, who had suffered a stroke, is under curatelle (a form of legal guardianship).	
20 May 2023	Boulogne is found dead in his apartment in Paris.	
23 May 2024	The Court of Cassation rules that the French courts may hear the case.	
May–June 2024	Boulogne's daughter Blanche applies to a Geneva court for a DNA sample from Delon, then abandons the Swiss procedure; his son Charles pursues an action in France.	
18 August 2024	Delon dies; a DNA analysis of Delon is no longer possible.	
12 June 2025	Boulogne's children relaunch the case before the Poitiers court of appeal.	
25 September 2025	The court of appeal dismisses the claim as time-barred, French law limiting such actions to ten years.	

Counsel for two of Delon's recognised children described the 2025 decision as "grounded in law". Press reports at the time noted that a further appeal on points of law remained legally possible. No DNA test was ever carried out, and Boulogne was never legally recognised as Delon's son.

==== Ari Boulogne's death ====
Boulogne was found dead on 20 May 2023 in his apartment in the 15th arrondissement of Paris, aged 60; the Paris prosecutor's office opened an investigation. Anthony Delon paid tribute to him on social media. Following forensic examinations, Boulogne was buried on 18 July 2023 at Jouy-en-Josas. He was survived by two children, Charles and Blanche.

=== Alain Delon's grandchildren ===
Press reports at the time of Alain Delon's death in August 2024 counted four grandchildren; a fifth was born in 2025.

- Through Anthony Delon: Alyson Le Borges (born 4 September 1986), his daughter with Marie-Hélène Le Borges, a dancer at the Crazy Horse cabaret in Paris, from a brief relationship; she sought legal recognition from her father at the age of 21; and Lou (born 1996) and Liv (born 2001), his daughters with his former wife Sophie Clerico.
- Through Anouchka Delon: Lino (born 2020), her son with the actor Julien Dereims, whom she married in 2021.
- Through Alain-Fabien Delon: Romy (born 29 April 2025, after her grandfather's death), his daughter with his partner Laura Bensadoun.
- Ari Boulogne's two children, Charles (born 1999) and Blanche, are putative grandchildren: their claim to that status is the subject of the legal proceedings.

== Gallery ==
Wives and partners of Alain Delon

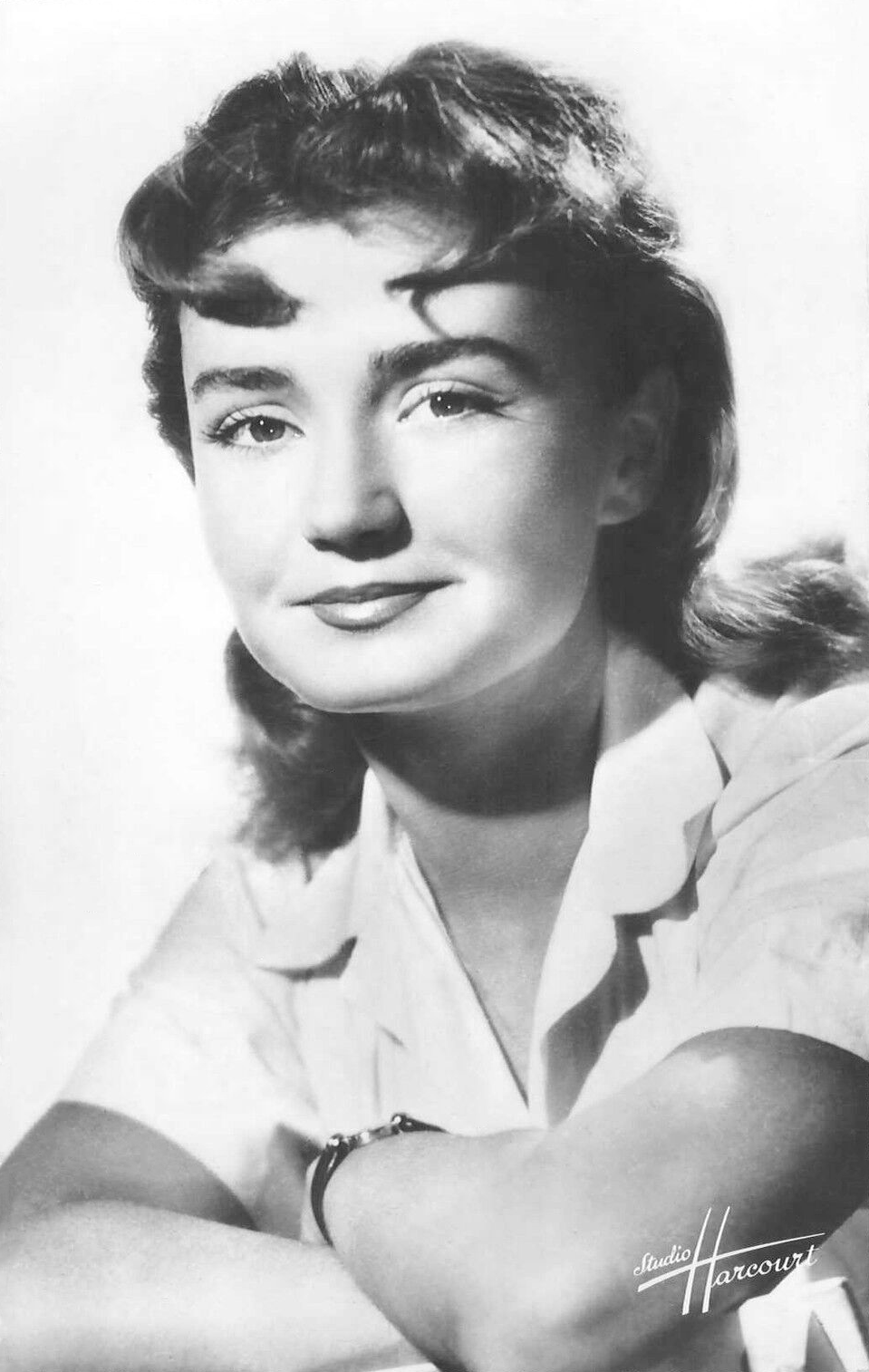
Brigitte Auber (1956)

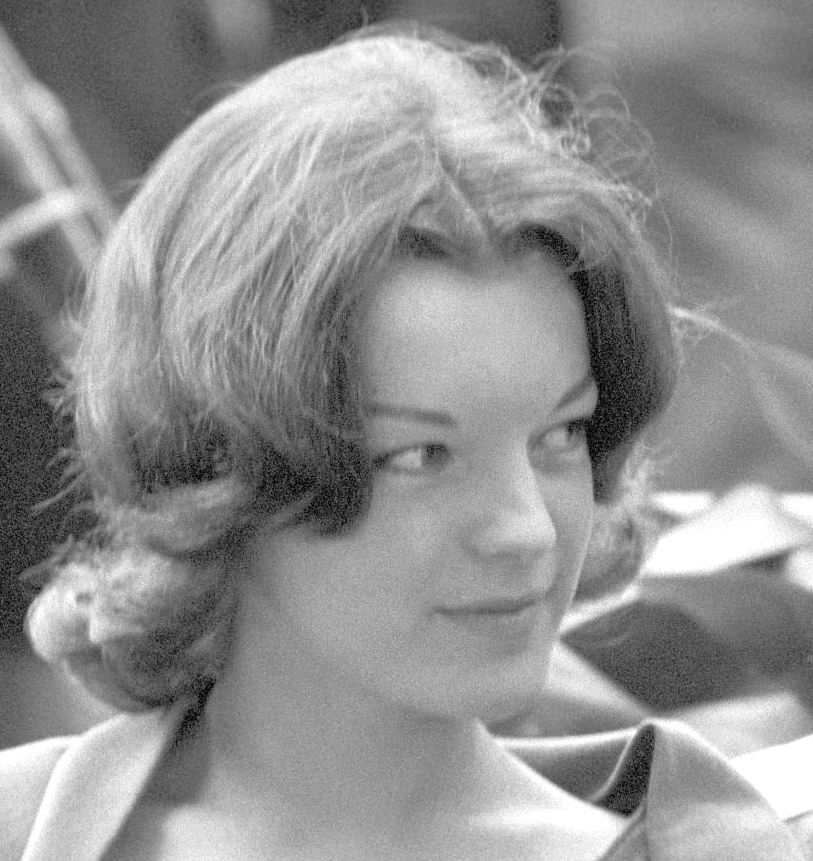
Romy Schneider (1958-1963)

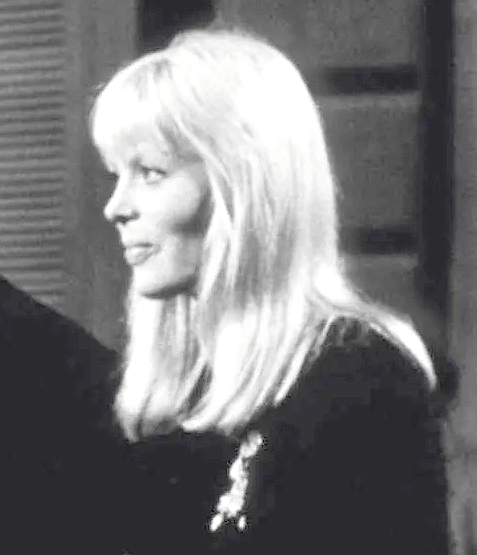
Nico (1961)

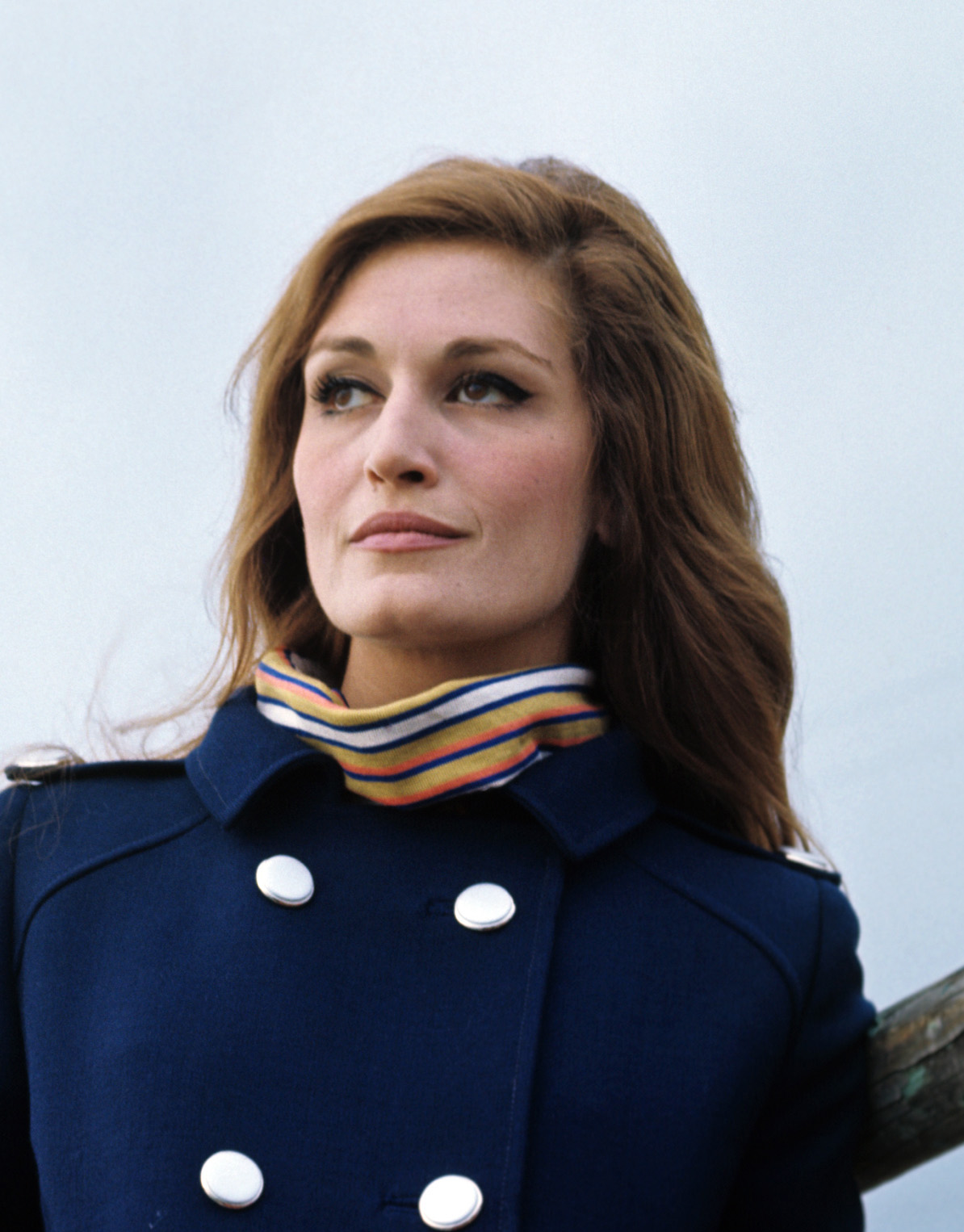
Dalida (1962)

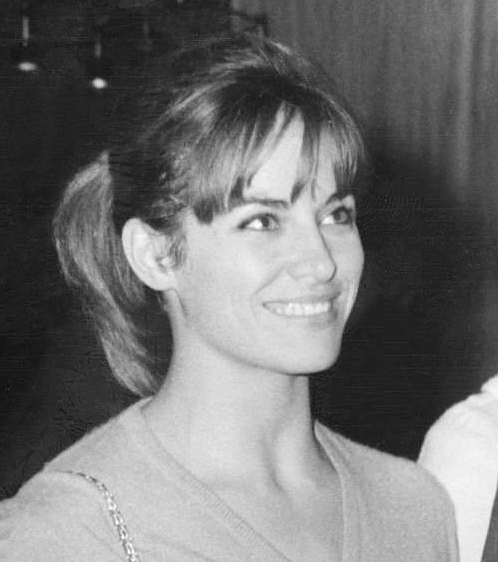
Nathalie Delon (1962-1968, épouse 1964-1968)

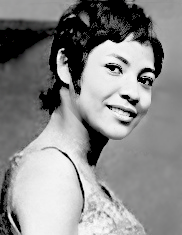
Maddly Bamy (1968-1971)

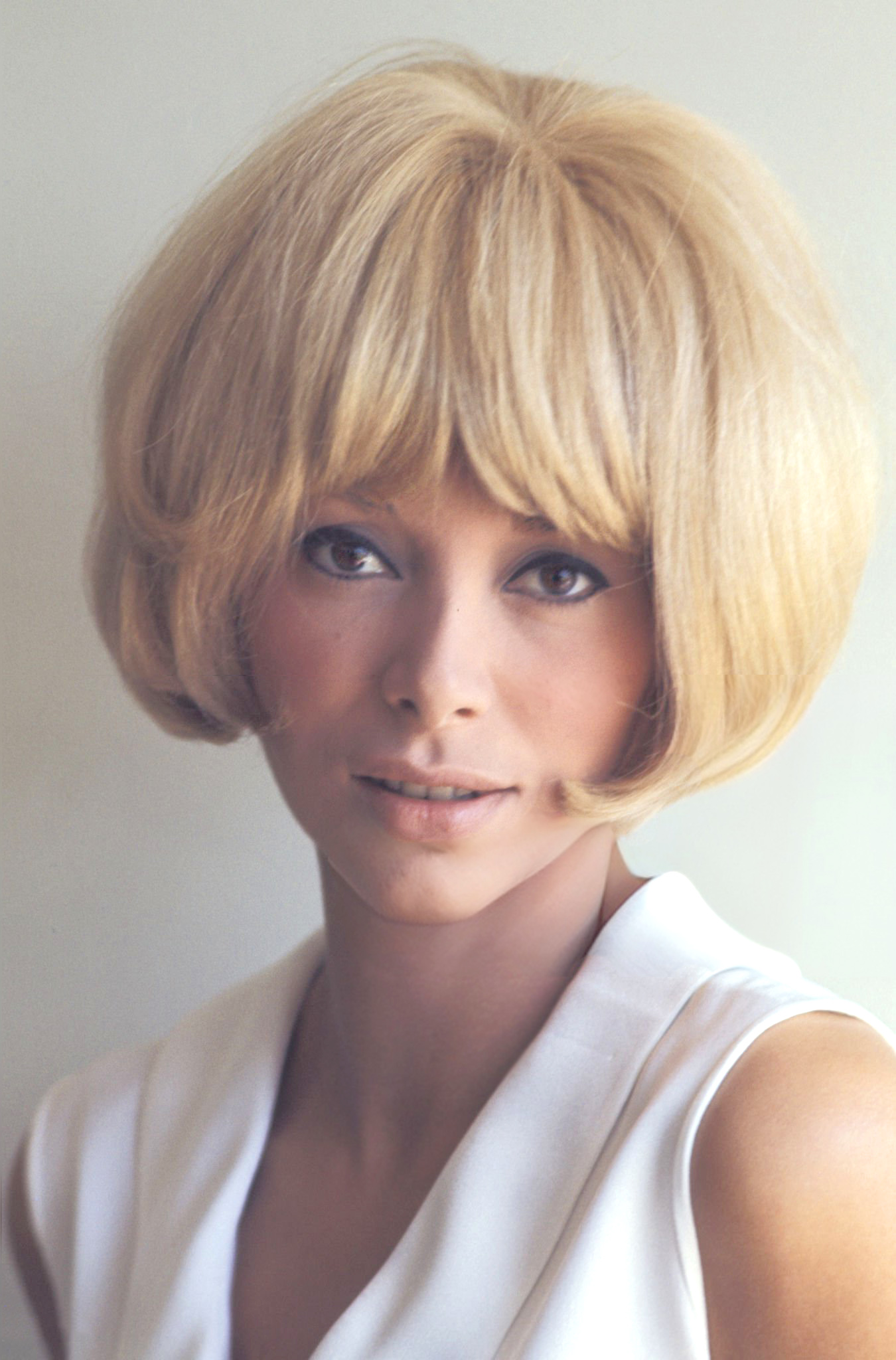
Mireille Darc (1968-1983)

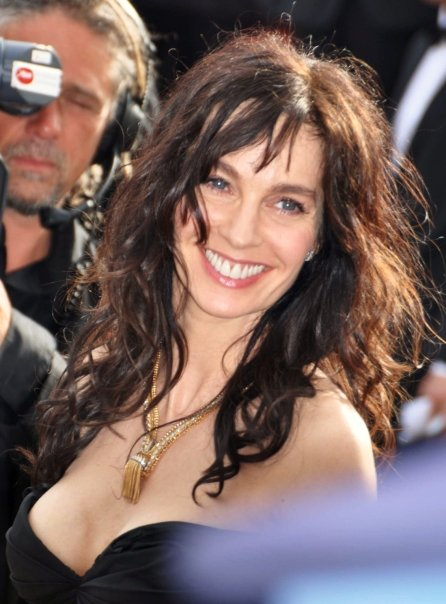
Anne Parillaud (1981-1986)

Not pictured:

- Rosalie van Breemen (1987-2001)

== See also ==
- List of Alain Delon performances
- Marković affair
- Nico (singer)
