= Delon =

Delon may refer to:

== People with the surname ==
- Alain Delon (1935–2024), French actor
- Alain-Fabien Delon (born 1994), French actor and model
- Anthony Delon (born 1964), French-American actor, son of Alain Delon
- Jean-Frédéric Delon (1778–1838), French painter
- Nathalie Delon (1941–2021), French actress and director

== People with the given name ==
- Delon Armitage (born 1983), rugby union footballer
- Delon Thamrin, Chinese-Indonesian singer and runner-up in the first season of the reality series Indonesian Idol
- Delon Turner (born 1971), American basketball player
- Delon Wright (born 1992), American basketball player

== Fictional characters ==
- Dela Delon, villain of the video game Brandish

== Science and technology ==
- Delon circuit, a voltage doubler circuit

== See also ==
- DeLon (born 1987), Sri Lankan-American rapper and actor
- Guy de Lons or Guy of Lescar (died 1141), Roman Catholic Bishop of Lescar (1115-1141)
