= Adonis A. Kyrou =

Greek filmmaker and writer

- Born: Adonis A. Kyrou; 18 October 1923; Athens, Greece
- Died: November 4, 1985 (aged 62); Paris, France
- Education: University of Athens; Sorbonne
- Occupations: Filmmaker; writer; film critic
- Known for: Le Surréalisme au cinéma (1953)

Adonis A. Kyrou (Greek: Άδωνις Α. Κύρου, Adonis A. Kyrou; 18 October 1923 – 4 November 1985) was a Greek-French filmmaker and writer, whose works often appeared under the name Ado Kyrou. A member of the surrealist movement and a key contributor to the film journal Positif, he is best known for his books on surrealist cinema and eroticism, notably Le Surréalisme au cinéma (1953) and Amour-érotisme et cinéma (1957). He directed several short films and two features, including Le Moine (1972).

== Biography ==
=== Early life and exile ===
Kyrou was born in Athens on 18 October 1923 into a prominent conservative family; his father, Achilleus A. Kyrou, was the owner of the major Greek newspaper Estia. He studied law at the University of Athens but became politically radicalised, joining the Greek Resistance during the Axis occupation of Greece and serving with EAM-ELAS as a student.

Following the assassination of the right-wing resistance figure Kitsos Maltezos, reprisals were carried out against EAM members; Kyrou was among those attacked, suffering a spinal wound from an assault by members of the right-wing nationalist student group ESAS and the collaborationist Special Security Directorate, and was rescued through the personal intervention of Ioannis Rallis. His participation in the Resistance caused a permanent break with his father. He left Greece for France in 1945, settling in Paris as a political refugee. Although frequently cited as a passenger on the 1945 Mataroa voyage, this attribution is erroneous.

In Paris, Kyrou completed a degree in literature at the Sorbonne while working as a correspondent for a Greek newspaper. In Athens he had already encountered the Greek surrealist Andreas Embirikos; in Paris, he met André Breton and was invited to join the surrealist group at the Café Le Cyrano. He became an active member of the movement, contributing to Le Surréalisme, même and the anarchist newspaper Le Libertaire (under the pseudonym Jean Charlaire), and remained affiliated with the surrealist group from 1951 to 1977.

=== Career ===
In 1951, Kyrou co-founded the short-lived avant-garde film journal L'Âge du cinéma alongside Robert Benayoun, Gérard Legrand, and Georges Goldfayn. The publication explicitly claimed a surrealist heritage and sought to revise classical film history through an irrealist lens, culminating in a special surrealist double-issue featuring a direct contribution from André Breton. Following the journal's financial collapse, Kyrou migrated to the newly established film magazine Positif in 1952, joining its formal editorial board in 1954. Over a sixteen-year tenure, he infused the publication with a fiercely leftist, surrealist orientation, positioning it as the primary ideological and aesthetic rival to the Catholic-leaning, formalist Cahiers du cinéma circle. During this same period, Kyrou became a key member of the collaborative circle surrounding the irreverent arts and literary review Bizarre, launched in 1953 by publisher Éric Losfeld, editor Michel Laclos, and book dealer Roger Cornaille.

Kyrou's critical approach was defined by passionate subjectivity and hostility to cultural orthodoxy. As a voice in surrealist film criticism, he championed Luis Buñuel, Frank Borzage, and Georges Méliès while openly disdaining filmmakers such as Roberto Rossellini, Robert Bresson, and Jean Cocteau. He argued that commercial and popular cinema — horror films, serials, melodramas — tapped into the subconscious more directly than high-art filmmaking, and that cinema was inherently a surrealist medium. This perspective was epitomised by his famous invocation to audiences: "I ask you, learn to go and see the 'worst' films; they are sometimes sublime."

His first major publication, Le Surréalisme au cinéma (1953), mapped a surrealist history of cinema, championing directors such as Tod Browning and claiming that film was the medium best suited to surrealist thought. His second, Amour-érotisme et cinéma (1957), was a comprehensive study of eroticism in film, drawing on extensive research including interviews and screenings facilitated by Henri Langlois. Both were published by Éric Losfeld's publishing house Le Terrain Vague.

As a filmmaker, Kyrou worked initially as an assistant director to Claude Autant-Lara and Christian-Jaque before directing his own short films from 1957. La Déroute (1957), narrated by Jean Servais, was a subversive meditation on war. Le Palais idéal (1958) profiled Ferdinand Cheval's Ideal Palace. La Chevelure (1960), narrated by Michel Piccoli, was a dreamlike adaptation of a Guy de Maupassant story. The short Un honnête homme (1964) won the Prix Louis Lumière.

His first feature, To Bloko (The Roundup, 1965), was a Greek-language film about a partisan ambush in a working-class quarter of Athens in August 1944. It was selected for the Thessaloniki International Film Festival, where it received a special mention. His second feature, The Monk (1972), was an adaptation of Matthew Gregory Lewis's Gothic novel The Monk, from a screenplay originally written by Luis Buñuel and Jean-Claude Carrière. Starring Franco Nero and Nathalie Delon, the film was a Franco-Italian-German co-production, but did not achieve the commercial success hoped for.

From the early 1960s, Kyrou also worked in television, directing episodes of series including Allô police (1969), the Swiss science fiction serial Sial IV (1969), and Face aux Lancaster (1971).

Kyrou died in Paris on 4 November 1985, aged 62.

== Publications ==
- Le Surréalisme au cinéma (Arcanes, 1953; revised edition, Le Terrain Vague, 1963; reissued Ramsay, 1985/2005)
- Amour-érotisme et cinéma (Éric Losfeld, 1957)
- Manuel du parfait petit spectateur, with illustrations by Siné (Le Terrain Vague, 1958)
- Luis Buñuel (Seghers, 1962)
- Un honnête homme (Le Terrain Vague, 1964)
- L'Âge d'or de la carte postale (Balland, 1966)
- Immalie et l'homme en noir (Éric Losfeld, 1971)

== Filmography ==
=== Short films ===
Year	Title	Notes
1957	La Déroute	narrated by Jean Servais
1958	Porte océane	
1958	Le Palais idéal	Narrated by Gaston Modot
1959	Le Havre	
1959	Parfois le dimanche	co-directed with Raoul Sangla
1960	La Chevelure	narrated by Michel Piccoli; after Guy de Maupassant
1962	Le Temps des assassins	
1962	La Paix et la Vie	narrated by Michel Piccoli
1963	Les Immortelles	
1964	Un honnête homme	Prix Louis Lumière

=== Feature films ===
Year	Title	English title	Notes
1965	To Bloko	The Roundup	Greek-language; special mention, Thessaloniki International Film Festival
1972	Le Moine	The Monk	screenplay by Luis Buñuel and Jean-Claude Carrière; starring Franco Nero, Nathalie Delon

=== Television ===
Year	Title	Notes
1969	Allô police	episode "Au diable la malice"
1969	Sial IV	Swiss science fiction serial
1971	Face aux Lancaster	series
