= Christian Aaron Boulogne =

French photographer and actor (1962–2023)

Ari Boulogne
- Born: Christian Aaron Päffgen; 11 August 1962; Neuilly-sur-Seine, France
- Died: May 2023 (aged 60); Paris, France
- Other names: Ari Boulogne, Ari Päffgen
- Occupations: Photographer; actor; writer
- Children: 2
- Parent(s): Nico; Alain Delon (allegedly)
- Relatives: Anthony Delon (half-brother); Anouchka Delon (half-sister); Alain-Fabien Delon (half-brother)

Christian Aaron Boulogne (11 August 1962 – May 2023), also known as Ari Boulogne and Ari Päffgen, was a French photographer, actor and writer.

== Early life ==
Boulogne was born in Neuilly-sur-Seine on 11 August 1962. He was the son of German singer and actress Nico. Nico always claimed that the biological father was French actor Alain Delon, although Delon consistently denied paternity to Boulogne.

He was initially raised by his mother before he was adopted by Delon's mother, Édith, and her second husband, Paul Boulogne, whose surname he legally took. Edith Boulogne said she always knew he was her grandson. He spent most of his childhood in Bourg-la-Reine.

In 2001 and 2019, Boulogne attempted to sue Delon for legal recognition of paternity, but without success.

== Career ==
Boulogne reunited with his mother as a teenager and began his career as an actor. He made appearances in films directed by Philippe Garrel, including the 1972 surrealist The Inner Scar, which he starred in with Nico, and the 1979 drama The Secret Son, in which he was credited as Ari Päffgen. After acting, Boulogne took on a career as a photographer.

== Personal life and death ==
Boulogne had two children.

In 2001, he published a memoir, Love Never Forgets, in which he elaborates on his relationship with his mother and his father.

Boulogne was found dead in his Paris apartment on 20 May 2023, following a heroin overdose a month before. A woman, supposedly his partner, was taken into custody for failure of duty to rescue. He was 60, and was in an advanced stage of decomposition when discovered.

== Selected filmography ==
- 1966: Chelsea Girls
- 1972: The Inner Scar (La cicatrice intérieure)
- 1979: The Secret Son (L'enfant secret)
- 1984: Mixed Blood
- 1995: Nico Icon
- 2002: The Repentant (La repentie)
- 2003: Nathalie...
- 2004: Pas sages
