= Delphine Chanéac =

French model, actress, and DJ

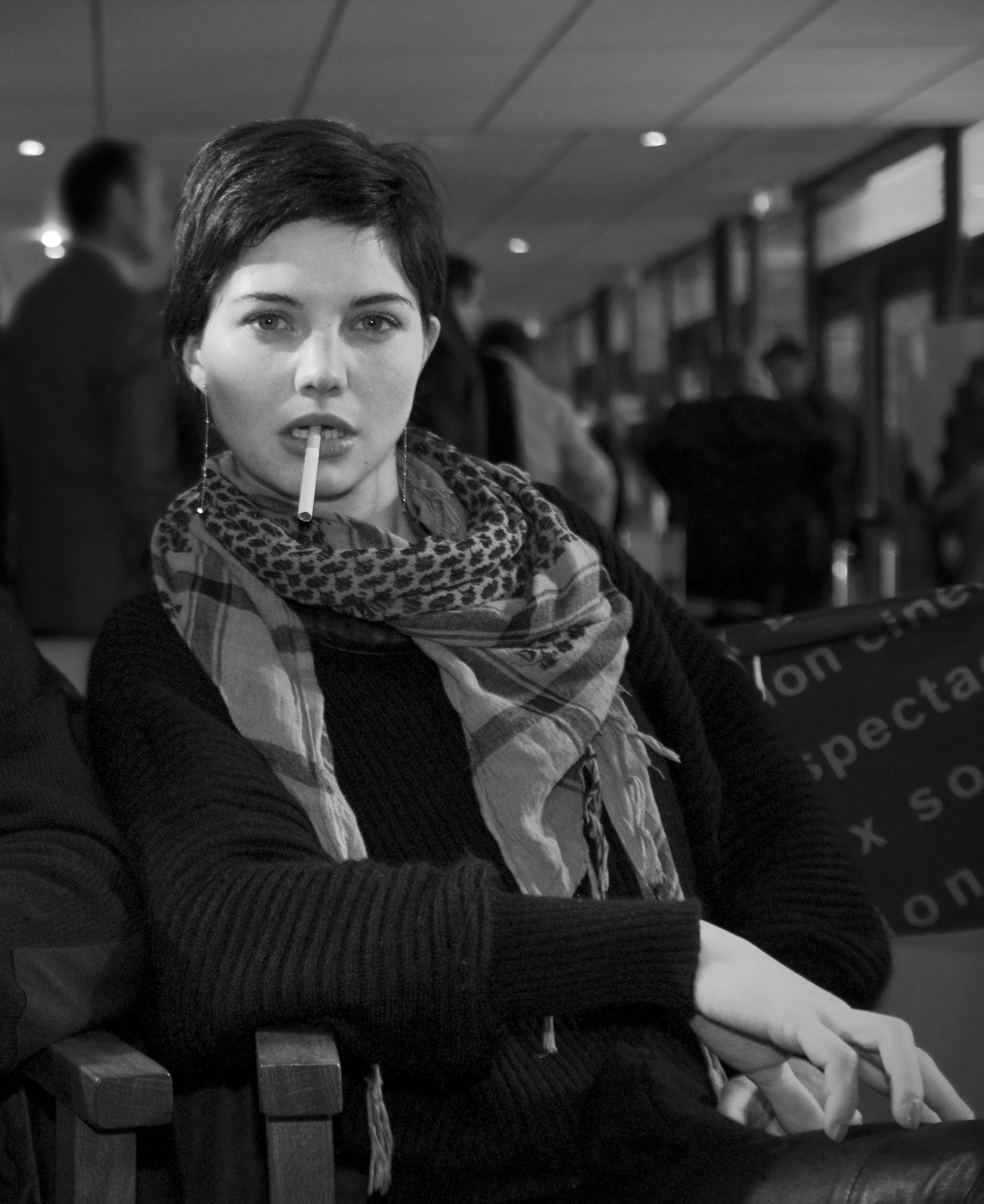
- Chanéac at the 2008 Festival Musique & Cinéma in Auxerre
- Born: 14 November 1978 (age 47); Valence, Drôme, France
- Occupation: Actress
- Years active: 1996-present

Delphine Chanéac (born 14 November 1978) is a French model, actress, and disc jockey. She was born in Valence, France.

== Career ==
Chanéac worked in French cinema, appearing in European films and television in the late 1990s and 2000s. She is best known for her role as Pauline in the French sitcom La Vie Devant Nous and for portraying the genetic hybrid Dren in the Canadian science fiction/horror movie Splice, shaving her head for the role. She also starred in the crime thriller Verso. She gave birth to a boy named Ethan in October 2015. The father of the child was her boyfriend, Éric Morais.

== Theater ==
Year	Title	Author	Director	Notes
2016	Welcome à Saint Tropez	Rémi Rosello	Rémi Rosello	Le Palace

== Filmography ==
Year	Title	Role	Director	Notes
1996	Jamais 2 sans toi	Ophélie	Rémi Honnoraty	TV series (1 episode)
1997	Sous le soleil	Charlotte Lacroix	Eric Summer	TV series (1 episode)
1998	Les vacances de l'amour	Daphné	Emmanuel Fonlladosa	TV series (1 episode)
1999	Un homme en colère	Claire	Dominique Tabuteau	TV series (1 episode)
2000	In extremis	Sophie	Etienne Faure	
2000	Les vacances de l'amour	Sophie	Emmanuel Fonlladosa (2)	TV series (1 episode)
2000	B.R.I.G.A.D.	Chloé Bertier	Marc Angelo	TV series (1 episode)
2000	Le juge est une femme	Agnès	Pierre Boutron	TV series (1 episode)
2000	Une femme d'honneur	Barbara	Dominique Tabuteau (2)	TV series (1 episode)
2001	Pas vu, pas pris	Karine	Dominique Tabuteau (3)	TV movie
2001	Julie Lescaut	Jennifer / Tina	Alain Wermus	TV series (1 episode)
2001	Les Cordier, juge et flic	Cécile	Gilles Béhat	TV series (1 episode)
2002	Le grand patron	Emma	Stéphane Kappes	TV series (1 episode)
2002	S.O.S. 18	Élodie Le Goff	Jacques Malaterre	TV series (1 episode)
2002	Louis la brocante	Sabine	Michel Favart	TV series (1 episode)
2002	Le G.R.E.C.	Angela	Henri Hasbani	TV series (1 episode)
2002	Island détectives		Olivier Altman	TV series (1 episode)
2002	La vie devant nous	Pauline	Vincenzo Marano, Alain Choquart, ...	TV series (12 episodes)
2003	Retour aux sources	Eléonore	Didier Grousset	TV movie
2003	Lola, qui es-tu Lola ?	Inès	Michel Hassan	TV series (1 episode)
2004	Léa Parker		Robin Davis	TV series (1 episode)
2005	Brice de Nice	Marjorie	James Huth	
2005	Inséparables	Hélène	Élisabeth Rappeneau	TV series (1 episode)
2005	Diane, femme flic	Alice	Dominique Tabuteau (4)	TV series (1 episode)
2006	The Pink Panther	Ticket Checker	Shawn Levy	
2006	Incontrôlable	Laura	Raffy Shart	
2006	Laura, le compte à rebours a commencé	Laura	Jean-Teddy Filippe	TV mini-series
2007	Trenhotel	Chloé	Lluís Maria Güell	TV movie
2007	Madame Hollywood	Sybille	Olivier Abbou	TV series (1 episode)
2008	Die Patin – Kein Weg zurück	Marie Almeda	Miguel Alexandre	TV mini-series
2008	Duval et Moretti	Katia	Dennis Berry	TV series (1 episode)
2009	Splice	Dren	Vincenzo Natali	Vancouver Film Critics Circle for Best Supporting Actress in a Canadian Film; Nominated - Fangoria Chainsaw Award for Best Supporting Actress
2009	Verso	Anja Lagrange	Xavier Ruiz	
2010	L'amour vache	Lili	Christophe Douchand	TV movie
2010	He's the One... Or Not	Laure	Vincent Giovanni	TV movie
2011	The Big Black	Eve	Oliver Kyr	
2011	L'amour encore plus vache	Lili	Christophe Douchand (2)	TV movie
2012	For the Love of Money	Aline	Ellie Kanner	
2012	The World of Hemingway	Margaux Hemingway	Giuseppe Recchia	
2012	Jungle Jihad	DCRI Agent	Nadir Ioulain	
2012	Transporter: The Series	Juliette Dubois	Brad Turner, Andy Mikita, ...	TV series (12 episodes)
2013	Eve	Eve	Eric Gandois	Short
2014	Tu es si jolie ce soir	Deborah	Jean-Pierre Mocky	
2014	Je suis coupable	The girl	Karine Lima	Short
2014	Le sang de la vigne	Nancy Marigny	Régis Musset	TV series (1 episode)
2015	Kickback	Rosemary Kaplan	Franck Phelizon	
2015	Camping paradis	Delphine	Thierry Peythieu	TV series (1 episode)
2016	Uchronia	First Love's Hostess	Christophe Goffette	
2016	Rouges étaient les lilas	Charlotte Lenoir	Jean-Pierre Mocky (2)	
2016	Cherif	Elodie Mansard	Vincent Giovanni (2)	TV series (1 episode)
2016	Famille d'accueil	Pauline	Stéphane Clavier	TV series (2 episodes)
2016	Stranger in the Dunes	Diana	Nicholas Bushman	

== Books ==
- Chanéac, Delphine (2007). La nuit, mon père me parle. Neuilly-sur-Seine: Lafon. ISBN 978-2-7499-0596-9.
- Chanéac, Delphine (2010). Ce qu'il reste de moi. Lafon. ISBN 978-2-8098-0234-4.
