= A Thorn in the Heart =

- Directed by: Alberto Lattuada
- Written by: Piero Chiara; Franco Ferrini; Alberto Lattuada; Enrico Oldoini
- Starring: Anthony Delon; Sophie Duez; Antonella Lualdi; Gastone Moschin; Leonardo Treviglio; Carola Stagnaro; Angelo Infanti
- Cinematography: Luigi Kuveiller
- Edited by: Ruggero Mastroianni
- Music by: Armando Trovajoli
- Distributed by: Titanus
- Release date: 1986
- Language: Italian

Una spina nel cuore, internationally released as A Thorn in the Heart, is a 1986 Italian romance-drama film directed by Alberto Lattuada. It is loosely based on the novel with the same title by Piero Chiara.

== Plot ==
Guido, a young man with a gambling problem, falls in love with a mysterious girl named Caterina. After a torrid affair, Caterina leaves Guido who then looks into her past and discovers she has had many lovers.

== Cast ==
- Anthony Delon as Guido
- Sophie Duez (it) as Caterina Marini
- Antonella Lualdi as Adelaide Biotti
- Gastone Moschin as Doctor Trigona
- Leonardo Treviglio as Tibiletti
- Carola Stagnaro as Teresita
- Angelo Infanti as Roberto Dionisotti
