= In extremis (film) =

- Directed by: Etienne Faure
- Written by: Etienne Faure
- Produced by: Etienne Faure
- Starring: Sébastien Roch; Julie Depardieu; Jérémy Sanguinetti
- Distributed by: Avila Films; Odessa Films (France); Picture This! Entertainment (USA, Canada)
- Release date: 23 August 2000
- Running time: 110 minutes
- Language: French

In extremis is a 2000 French film written and directed by Etienne Faure. It tells the story of Thomas, a young man whose lover dies, leaving Thomas to fight for custody of her orphaned son. It takes its name from the Latin phrase which means "in the furthest reaches" or "at the point of death".

== Cast ==
- Sébastien Roch as Thomas
- Julie Depardieu as Anne
- Jérémy Sanguinetti as Grégoire
- Christine Boisson as Caroline
- Aurélien Wiik as Vincent
- Sophie Mounicot as Laurence
- Candice Hugo as Géraldine
- Delphine Chanéac as Sophie
