= Splice (film) =

2009 film by Vincenzo Natali

- US theatrical release poster
- Directed by: Vincenzo Natali
- Screenplay by: Vincenzo Natali; Antoinette Terry Bryant; Doug Taylor
- Story by: Vincenzo Natali; Antoinette Terry Bryant
- Produced by: Steve Hoban
- Starring: Adrien Brody; Sarah Polley; Delphine Chanéac
- Cinematography: Tetsuo Nagata
- Edited by: Michele Conroy
- Music by: Cyrille Aufort
- Production companies: Copperheart Entertainment; Gaumont; Telefilm Canada; Ontario Media Development Corporation
- Distributed by: Les Films Séville (Canada); Gaumont (France)
- Release dates: October 6, 2009 (Sitges); June 4, 2010 (Canada); June 30, 2010 (France)
- Running time: 104 minutes
- Countries: Canada; France
- Language: English
- Budget: $30 million
- Box office: $27.1 million

Splice is a 2009 science fiction horror film directed by Vincenzo Natali, and starring Adrien Brody, Sarah Polley, and Delphine Chanéac. The story concerns experiments in genetic engineering being done by a young scientific couple, who attempt to introduce human DNA into their work of splicing animal genes resulting in the creation of a human–animal hybrid.

The film premiered at the 2009 Sitges Film Festival, before the US distriubtion rights were bought by Dark Castle Entertainment. Splice released on June 4, 2010 and June 30, 2010, in Canada and France, respectively. Despite generally positive reviews from critics, it was a box-office bomb, only grossing $27.1 million against a $30 million budget.

== Plot ==
Genetic engineers Clive Nicoli and Elsa Kast hope to achieve fame by splicing animal DNA to create hybrids for medical use at the company N.E.R.D. (Nucleic Exchange Research and Development). Their work has yielded Fred and Ginger, two large vermiform creatures intended as mates for each other. After successfully mating them, Clive and Elsa plan to create a revolutionary human–animal hybrid. Their employers Joan Chorot and William Barlow forbid this and order them to focus on identifying and extracting proteins from Fred and Ginger for drug production.

However, Clive and Elsa follow their plans in secret and develop a viable prepubescent female creature. Although they planned to terminate before the hybrid reached full term, Elsa persuades Clive to let it live. The hybrid physically ages much faster than humans and mentally develops like a human child. After it spells out NERD with toys after seeing the acronym on Elsa's shirt, Elsa names it "Dren".

Clive's brother Gavin discovers Dren but flees after she jumps on him. Elsa notices Dren has a fever and tries to cool her in an industrial-sized sink of cold water. Clive holds Dren underwater. This forces Dren to use her gills, revealing she is amphibious. Elsa forms a motherly bond with Dren. Meanwhile, Elsa and Clive neglect their work with Fred and Ginger. At a publicized presentation, Fred and Ginger fight and kill each other. Ginger had spontaneously changed into a male, but Elsa and Clive failed to notice as they were focused on Dren.

The couple moves Dren to the isolated farm where Elsa grew up. Dren reveals she has carnivorous tendencies and retractable wings and enters adolescence. She grows bored of confinement, but Elsa and Clive fear she might be discovered outside. Clive realizes the human DNA used to create Dren is not that of an anonymous donor, as Elsa told him, but Elsa's.

After Dren kills her pet cat with the stinger on her tail, Elsa restrains her roughly and amputates the stinger, then uses it to synthesize a protein for their work. While alone with each other, Dren and Clive have sex, much to Elsa's horror. Clive accuses Elsa of not wanting a "normal" child prior to that because of her fear of losing control. They return to the farm to terminate Dren but find her seemingly dying.

William Barlow discovers human DNA in Dren's protein samples and arrives at the barn with Gavin, who revealed the location. Elsa says Dren is dead and buried behind the barn. Having spontaneously metamorphosed into a male, Dren rises from the grave and attacks them, killing Barlow and Gavin before raping Elsa. Clive attacks Dren to help Elsa but is overpowered by Dren. Elsa attacks Dren to help Clive but hesitates, which allows Dren to sting Clive, killing him. Elsa then kills Dren in retaliation.

In an office tower, Joan tells Elsa that Dren's body contained numerous biochemical compounds, for which the company is filing patents. She offers a visibly pregnant Elsa a large sum of money to go through with the pregnancy that Elsa accepts.

== Cast ==
- Adrien Brody as Clive Nicoli
- Sarah Polley as Elsa Kast
- Delphine Chanéac as Dren
  - Abigail Chu as Child Dren
- Brandon McGibbon as Gavin Nicoli
- Simona Maicanescu as Joan Chorot
- David Hewlett as William Barlow

== Production ==
Splice was written by director Vincenzo Natali and screenwriters Antoinette Terry Bryant and Doug Taylor. The script was originally meant to follow up Natali's Cube (1997), but the budget and restricted technology hindered the project. In 2007, the project entered active development as a 75% Canadian and 25% French co-production, receiving a budget of $26 million. Natali said Splice is "about our genetic future" and upcoming scientific issues. He described it as "a serious film and an emotional one" with disturbing sexual themes. He said he wanted to "create something shocking but also very subtle and completely believable".

In October 2007, actors Brody and Polley were cast into the lead roles. Production began the following November in Toronto. It was aided by Telefilm Canada's funding of US$2.5 million. Filming took place in Toronto and concluded in February 2008.

Natali said that although he did not personally intend for any sequels to be made, they were a possibility.

== Release ==
The film premiered on October 6, 2009, at the Sitges Film Festival, where it won "Best Special Effects" and was in the running for "Best Film", and was part of the 2010 Sundance Film Festival in Park City, Utah. After a bidding war with Apparition, The Weinstein Company, Newmarket Films, First Look Studios, and Samuel Goldwyn Films, Dark Castle Entertainment purchased the U.S. rights to the film and the worldwide rights to any possible sequels in February 2010, thinking they had "found the next Paranormal Activity". The film received a wide release in the United States on June 4, 2010, with Warner Bros. Pictures as distributor. The trailer was attached to two other Warner Bros. movies, The Losers and A Nightmare on Elm Street. The film opened on June 4, 2010, in wide release to a $7.4 million opening weekend in 2,450 theaters, averaging $3,014 per theater. Splice was released on DVD and Blu-ray on October 5, 2010, in the US and on November 29, 2010, in the UK.

== Reception ==
On the review aggregator website Rotten Tomatoes, 75% of 200 critics' reviews are positive, with an average rating of 6.8/10. The website's consensus reads: "It doesn't take its terrific premise quite as far as it should, but Splice is a smart, well-acted treat for horror fans." Metacritic, which uses a weighted average, assigned the film a score of 66 out of 100, based on 35 critics, indicating "generally favorable" reviews. Audiences polled by CinemaScore gave the film an average grade of "D" on an A+ to F scale.

Manohla Dargis of The New York Times wrote that Natali "hasn't reinvented the horror genre" but "has done the next best thing with an intelligent movie that, in between its small boos and an occasional hair-raising jolt, explores chewy issues like bioethics, abortion, corporate-sponsored science, commitment problems between lovers and even Freudian-worthy family dynamics." Andrew O'Hehir from Salon said "Dark, sleek, funny and creepily infectious, the genetic-engineering horror-comedy Splice is a dynamic comeback vehicle for Canadian genre director Vincenzo Natali, who made a splash a few years ago with Cube." Lisa Schwarzbaum from Entertainment Weekly gave the film an A− and stated, "The outstanding creature effects by Howard Berger only get more astonishing as Splice splits into an eerie horror picture, then divides again into something out of Rosemary's Baby."

Roger Ebert from the Chicago Sun-Times called it "well done and intriguing" but said it is disappointing in that it does not explore Dren's persona. Comparing the film to David Cronenberg's The Brood, Peter Travers from Rolling Stone said, "Played as a child by Abigail Chu and as an adult by Delphine Chanéac, Dren morphs into a special-effects miracle, sexy and scary in equal doses." and gave the film 3 out of 4. Also comparing the sex scenes to Cronenberg's work, Mick LaSalle of the San Francisco Chronicle rated it 2/4 stars and wrote that while it has several disgusting scenes, it is "a regulation monster movie" that is "too dumb to be serious and too slow to be entertaining". Richard Roeper panned Splice, calling it one of the worst movies of 2010. He gave the film a D+, calling it "ridiculous" but giving it credit for trying to be different.

=== Accolades ===
Splice won the 2011 Telefilm Golden Box Office Award, CAD$40,000, for being the highest-grossing Canadian feature film in English in 2010.

The film was nominated for Best Science Fiction Film at 37th Saturn Awards, but lost to Inception, another film from Warner Bros. Pictures.
