= A Whisper in the Dark =

- Directed by: Marcello Aliprandi
- Story by: Nicolò Rienzi; Maria Teresa Rienzi
- Produced by: Enzo Gallo
- Starring: John Phillip Law; Nathalie Delon; Olga Bisera
- Cinematography: Claudio Cirillo
- Edited by: Gian Maria Messeri
- Music by: Pino Donaggio
- Production company: Cinemondial S.r.l.
- Distributed by: Lia Film
- Release date: 12 August 1976 (Italy)
- Running time: 102 minutes
- Country: Italy
- Box office: ₤171.391 million

A Whisper in the Dark (Italian: Un sussurro nel buio) is a 1976 Italian film directed by Marcello Aliprandi.

== Cast ==
- John Phillip Law as Alex
- Nathalie Delon as Camilla
- Olga Bisera as Françoise
- Alessandro Poggi as Martino
- Joseph Cotten as the Professor
- Lucretia Love as Susan
- Zora Velcova as Camilla's Mother
- Adriana Russo as Clara

== Production ==
A Whisper in the Dark was written by the husband and wife screenwriting team of Nicolò Rienzi and Maria Teresa Rienzi. The film was shot in Venice in early 1976. John Phillip Law who acted in the film, stated that the film was made due to the popularity of the film Don't Look Now.

== Release ==
A Whisper in the Dark was distribute theatrically in Italy by Lia Film on 12 August 1976. It grossed a total of 171,391,126 Italian lire on its domestic release, which Italian film historian and author Roberto Curti described as "disappointing" and that the film "sunk at the box office".

== Reception ==
Curti stated that the film earned "moderate critical praise" on its release. Tullio Kezich admired the bizarre fantastic atmosphere of the film, while it "exceeds in extravaganzas [...] where it would have taken discipline of choice" Giovanni Grazzini that with this film Aliprandi had "grown up" and despite lacking his own personality as a director he "runs the show".
