= Pino Donaggio =

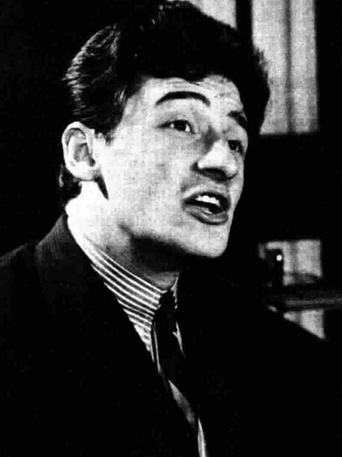
- Pino Donaggio in 1965

Background information
- Born: Giuseppe Donaggio; 24 November 1941 (age 84); Burano, Venice, Kingdom of Italy
- Genres: Film score; pop; classical
- Occupations: Musician; composer; singer; orchestrator; arranger; songwriter
- Instruments: Vocals; violin; piano
- Years active: 1955–present
- Website: clancelentano.it

Giuseppe "Pino" Donaggio (born 24 November 1941) is an Italian musician, singer, and composer of film and television scores. A classically-trained violinist, Donaggio is known for his collaborations with director Brian De Palma, and for his work in both European and American genre cinema. He has won two Italian Golden Globe Awards, and has been nominated for two David di Donatello, four Golden Ciak, two Nastro d'Argento, and a Saturn Award.

== Life and career ==
Born in Burano (an island of Venice), into a family of musicians, Donaggio began studying violin at the age of ten, first at the Benedetto Marcello conservatory in Venice, followed by the Giuseppe Verdi Conservatory in Milan. At the age of 14, he made his solo debut in a Vivaldi concert for Italian radio, then went on to play for both the I Solisti Veneti and the Solisti di Milano. The discovery of rock and roll during the summer of 1959 ended Donaggio's classical career when he made his singing debut with Paul Anka. He then began to write his own songs and established himself as one of Italy's prominent singer-songwriters. He took part in the Sanremo Festival with "Come sinfonia" (1961) and had a string of successes including "Una casa in cima al mondo".

However, his greatest hit was the 1965 hit "Io che non vivo", which sold 80 million records worldwide and was performed most popularly in English as "You Don't Have to Say You Love Me" by Dusty Springfield and Elvis Presley.

His first film was the British/Italian horror film Don't Look Now. Since then he has composed music for several films, including Dario Argento's Two Evil Eyes, Trauma and Do You Like Hitchcock? He also composed the scores for several horror films including Piranha, Tourist Trap, The Howling, The Black Cat and Seed of Chucky. He works regularly with US director Brian De Palma, scoring De Palma's Carrie, Home Movies, Dressed to Kill, Blow Out, Body Double, Raising Cain and Passion.

In 2012 he was awarded the Lifetime Achievement Award from the World Soundtrack Academy.

== Filmography ==
=== Film ===
==== 1970s ====
Year	Title	Director	Notes
1973	Don't Look Now	Nicolas Roeg	
1975	Smiling Maniacs (Corruzione al palazzo di giustizia)	Marcello Aliprandi	
1976	A Whisper in the Dark (Un sussurro nel buio)	Marcello Aliprandi	
1976	Haunts	Herb Freed	
1976	Carrie	Brian De Palma	
1978	Damned in Venice (Nero veneziano)	Ugo Liberatore	
1978	Piranha	Joe Dante	
1978	China 9, Liberty 37	Monte Hellman	
1979	Tourist Trap	David Schmoeller	
1979	Home Movies	Brian De Palma	
1979	Skin Deep (Senza buccia)	Marcello Aliprandi	

==== 1980s ====
Year	Title	Director	Notes
1980	Dressed to Kill	Brian De Palma	
1980	Desire: The Inner Life (Desideria: La vita interiore)	Gianni Barcelloni	
1981	The Howling	Joe Dante	
1981	The Black Cat	Lucio Fulci	
1981	The Fan	Ed Bianchi	
1981	Blow Out	Brian De Palma	
1982	Tex	Tim Hunter	
1982	Beyond the Door	Liliana Cavani	
1982	Vatican Conspiracy (Morte in Vaticano)	Marcello Aliprandi	
1982	Street of Mirrors (Via degli specchi)	Giovanna Gagliardo	
1983	Hercules	Luigi Cozzi	
1983	The World of Don Camillo	Terence Hill	
1984	Over the Brooklyn Bridge	Menahem Golan	
1984	Body Double	Brian De Palma	
1984	Nothing Left to Do But Cry (Non ci resta che piangere)	Roberto Benigni; Massimo Troisi	
1985	The Lie	Giovanni Soldati	
1985	Déjà Vu	Anthony B. Richmond	
1985	Ordeal by Innocence	Desmond Davis	Rejected score Replaced by Dave Brubeck
1985	The Adventures of Hercules	Luigi Cozzi	
1985	The Berlin Affair	Liliana Cavani	
1985	Nothing Underneath	Carlo Vanzina	
1985	Savage Dawn	Simon Nuchtern	
1986	Crawlspace	David Schmoeller	
1986	The Moro Affair	Giuseppe Ferrara	
1986	7 chili in 7 giorni	Luca Verdone	
1987	Hotel Colonial	Cinzia Th. Torrini	
1987	The Barbarians	Ruggero Deodato	
1987	Gor	Fritz Kiersch	
1987	Jenatsch	Daniel Schmid	
1987	Going Bananas	Boaz Davidson	
1987	Devils of Monza	Luciano Odorisio	
1987	Scirocco	Aldo Lado	
1987	Dancers	Herbert Ross	
1988	Phantom of Death	Ruggero Deodato	
1988	Zelly and Me	Tina Rathborne	
1988	Catacombs	David Schmoeller	
1988	Appointment with Death	Michael Winner	
1988	Kansas	David Stevens	
1988	High Frequency	Faliero Rosati	
1988	The Gamble	Carlo Vanzina	
1988	Outlaw of Gor	John Cardos	
1989	Night Game	Peter Masterson	
1989	Indio	Antonio Margheriti	
1989	Ritual of Love	Aldo Lado	

==== 1990s ====
Year	Title	Director	Notes
1990	Meridian: Kiss of the Beast	Charles Band	
1990	Two Evil Eyes	George A. Romero; Dario Argento	
1991	The Devil's Daughter	Michele Soavi	Replaced Simon Boswell
1991	Indio 2: The Revolt	Antonio Margheriti	
1991	A Demon in My View	Petra Haffter	
1991	Un amore sconosciuto	Gianni Amico	
1992	All Ladies Do It	Tinto Brass	
1992	Raising Cain	Brian De Palma	
1992	A Fine Romance	Gene Saks	
1993	Trauma	Dario Argento	
1993	Where Are You? I'm Here	Liliana Cavani	
1993	Giovanni Falcone	Giuseppe Ferrara	
1994	Oblivion	Sam Irvin	
1994	Troublemakers	Terence Hill	
1994	Power and Lovers	Aldo Lado	
1995	Un eroe borghese	Michele Placido	
1995	State Secret	Giuseppe Ferrara	
1995	Mollo tutto	José María Sánchez	
1995	Palermo - Milan One Way	Claudio Fragasso	
1995	Soldato ignoto	Marcello Aliprandi	
1995	Never Talk to Strangers	Peter Hall	Composed with Steve Sexton
1996	Oblivion 2: Backlash	Sam Irvin	
1996	The Mysterious Enchanter	Pupi Avati	
1996	Festival	Pupi Avati	
1996	Marching in Darkness	Massimo Spano	
1996	Squillo	Carlo Vanzina	
1997	The Game Bag	Maurizio Zaccaro	
1997	La terza luna	Matteo Bellinelli	
1998	Snake Eyes	Brian De Palma	Rejected score Replaced by Ryuichi Sakamoto
1998	Monella	Tinto Brass	
1998	Gunslinger's Revenge	Giovanni Veronesi	
1999	Prima del tramonto	Stefano Incerti	
1999	A Respectable Man	Maurizio Zaccaro	
1999	Terra bruciata	Fabio Segatori	

==== 2000s ====
Year	Title	Director	Notes
2000	Trasgredire	Tinto Brass	
2000	Up at the Villa	Philip Haas	
2000	On the Beach Beyond the Pier	Giovanni Fago	
2001	Tra due mondi	Fabio Conversi	
2001	The Order	Sheldon Lettich	
2002	The Bankers of God: The Calvi Affair	Giuseppe Ferrara	
2002	Soul Mate	Sergio Rubini	
2004	Pontormo – Un amore eretico	Giovanni Fago	
2004	Seed of Chucky	Don Mancini	
2005	Do You Like Hitchcock?	Dario Argento	
2006	Our Land	Sergio Rubini	
2006	Anthony, Warrior of God	Antonello Belluco	
2007	Guido che sfidò le Brigate Rosse	Giuseppe Ferrara	
2007	Milano Palermo – Il ritorno	Claudio Fragasso	
2008	At a Glance	Sergio Rubini	
2008	Winter in Wartime	Martin Koolhoven	

==== 2010s ====
Year	Title	Director	Notes
2011	Sotto il vestito niente – L'ultima sfilata	Carlo Vanzina	
2012	Passion	Brian De Palma	
2013	Patrick	Mark Hartley	
2014	La buca	Daniele Ciprì	
2016	La grande rabbia	Claudio Fragasso	
2017	Where I've Never Lived	Paolo Franchi	
2018	My Name Is Thomas	Terence Hill	
2018	Mare di grano	Fabrizio Guarducci	
2019	Domino	Brian De Palma	

==== 2020s ====
Year	Title	Director	Notes
2022	Spin Me Round	Jeff Baena	
2026	Her Private Hell	Nicolas Winding Refn	

=== Television ===
- Strada senza uscita (1986)
- The Fifth Missile (1986)
- Tabloid Crime (1987)
- Ocean (1989)
- Non aprite all'uomo nero (1990)
- The Mysteries of the Dark Jungle (1991)
- Pray for Ricki Forster (1991)
- La stella del parco (1991)
- Scoop (1992)
- Colpo di coda (1993)
- Missione d'amore (1993)
- Cliffs of the Death (1993)
- L'ispettore Sarti – Un poliziotto, una città (1993–94)
- Ho un segreto con papà (1994)
- Inka Connection (1995)
- Californian Quartet (1995)
- Die Straßen von Berlin (1995–96)
- Nach uns die Sintflut (1996)
- New York Crossing (1996)
- Die Stunden vor dem Morgengrauen (1997)
- Racket (1997)
- Inquietudine (1997)
- Rescuers: Stories of Courage (1998)
- Il tesoro di Damasco (1998)
- Le ragazze di Piazza di Spagna (1998–99)
- Avvocati (1998–99)
- Only A Dead Man Is A Good Man (1999)
- Angels' Sin (1999)
- Commesse (1999–2002)
- Don Matteo (2000–14)
- Sospetti (2000–04)
- Lo zio d'America (2002–06)
- Un caso di coscienza (2003–06)
- Provaci ancora prof (2005–07)
- La moglie cinese (2006)
- Il segreto di Arianna (2007)
- Fuga con Marlene (2007)
- La vita rubata (2008)
- Fidati di me (2008–09)
- Ho sposato uno sbirro (2008–10)
- L'uomo che cavalcava nel buio (2009)
- Sisi (2009)
- La donna che ritorna (2011)
- Dove la trovi una come me? (2011)
- Rossella (2011–12)
- Un passo dal cielo (2011–12)
- Cesare Mori – Il prefetto di ferro (2012)
- Madre, aiutami (2013–14)
- La strada dritta (2014)
- Il sistema (2016)
