= Vatican Conspiracy =

1982 film

Morte in Vaticano
- Directed by: Marcello Aliprandi
- Music by: Pino Donaggio
- Release date: 1982
- Country: Italy
- Language: Italian

Vatican Conspiracy or Morte in Vaticano is a 1982 Italian film directed by Marcello Aliprandi. It stars Terence Stamp, Fabrizio Bentivoglio, and Gabriele Ferzetti.

== Cast ==
- Terence Stamp as Padre Luigi Andreani / Pope John Clement I
- Fabrizio Bentivoglio as Padre Bruno Martello
- Paula Molina as Nina
- Gabriele Ferzetti as Cardinale Ixaguirre
- José Luis López Vázquez as Don Perrone
- Antonio Marsina as Vittorio
- Roberto Antonelli as Patrick La Place
- Adriano Amidei Migliano as Dottore
- Eduardo Fajardo as Rettore
