= Edoardo Stoppa =

Italian television personality (born 1969)

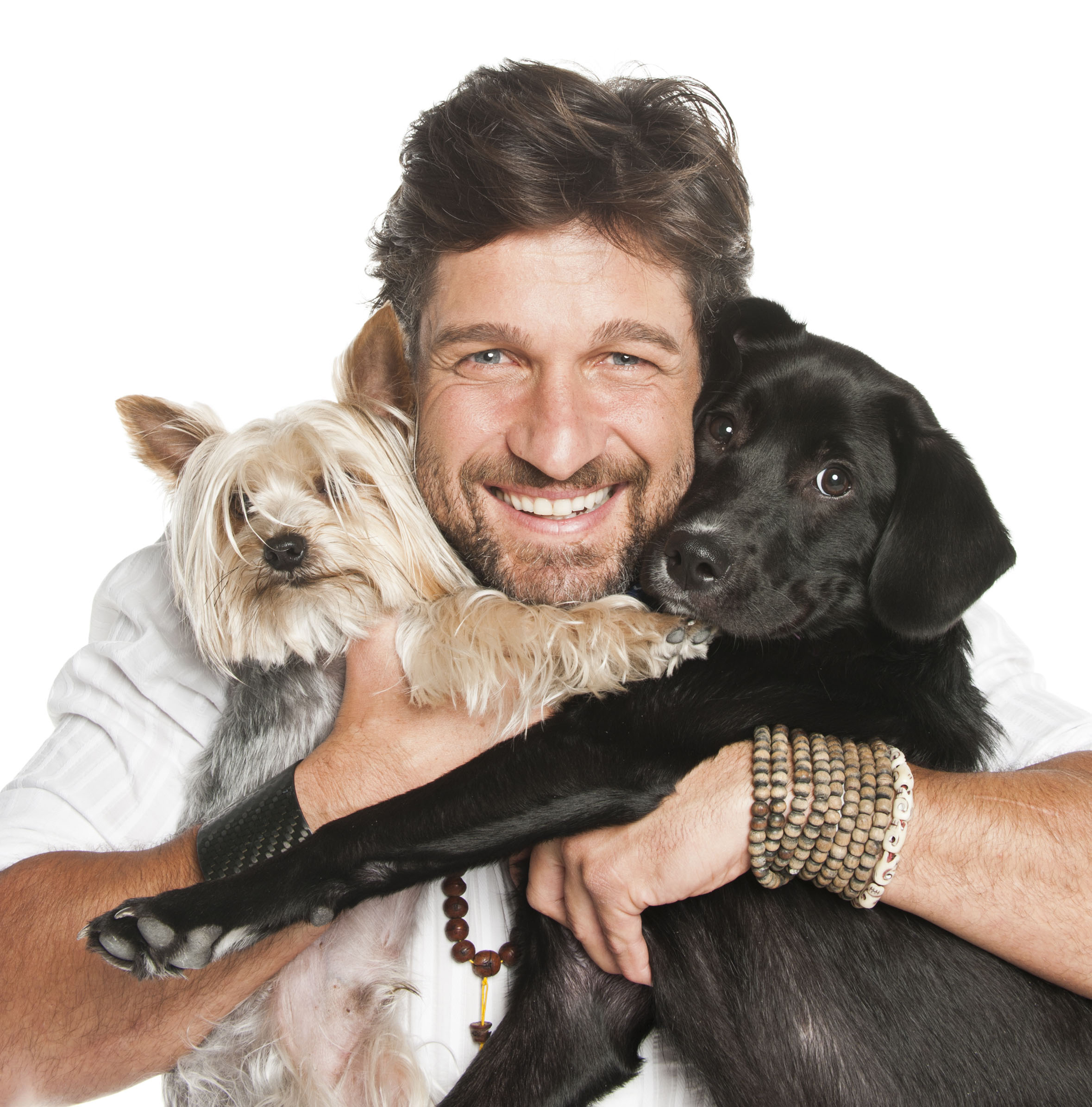
- Born: 20 November 1969 (age 56); Milan, Italy
- Occupation: TV personality
- Children: Lua Sophie Ermenegilda Moreira Stoppa; Sol Gabriel Moreira Stoppa
- Awards: MMSP
- Website: Official website

Edoardo Stoppa (born 20 November 1969) is an Italian television personality.

== Early life and education ==
Stoppa has a degree in psychology from the University of Padua and studied acting with Lino Damian.

== Career ==
Stoppa worked for Match Music and La7, presenting programs such as Prima del processo, Zengi e Mango, Call game. On La7 he worked for four seasons on National Geographic, presenting and producing documentaries. For AllMusic he was as co-author, co-creator and co-presenter with Christian Sonzogni the programs Modeland, a satire on fashion and music, and Music Zoo. For Mediaset he was an actor in several episodes of Scherzi a parte and he led Village. He also worked in radio and film.

In March 2006 Stoppa joined Team Sky, to run the international format E!News alongside Ellen Hidding. He also conducted the extreme sports program "SHOCK" on Sky Vivo.

He became a correspondent of the satirical television program Striscia la notizia from 2008 to 2020, where he worked on animal welfare. After Striscia la Notizia, he became a correspondent for the program Ogni mattina, where he continues to deal with animals and the environment.

== Personal life ==
In 2007 he was engaged with the Brazilian showgirl Juliana Moreira, with whom he had two children: a girl, Lua Sophie, born 25 July 2011, and a boy, Sol Gabriel, born 29 August 2016. They were married in a civil wedding on 10 November 2017.

Stoppa practices skydiving, snowboarding and martial arts. He is a skydiving instructor with over 5,000 jumps to his credit; he is a snowboard instructor and competed with Team Italia in the Campionato del Mondo ISF coming at the top of the world ranking list including races of the Coppa Italia. He practices Muay Thai (Thai boxing), free climbing, surfing, and motocross. He owns a twin-engine, turbine plane to enable the launch of parachutists, and towing gliders.

He considers himself Roman Catholic, but he is also interested in Eastern religions, such as Buddhism and Hinduism.

== Filmography ==
=== Television ===
- Usa Today (Italia 7) – host
- Convoy e Irregular Contest (Match Music) – host
- Skypass (Stream TV) – host
- Prima del processo (La7) – host
- Zengi e Mango (La7) – host
- L'uomo perfetto (Sky Vivo) – host together with Ellen Hidding
- Call game (La7) – host
- Scherzi a parte (Canale 5) – actor
- Village (Italia 1) – host
- Music Zoo (AllMusic) – host
- Modeland (AllMusic) – host
- Striscia la notizia (Canale 5) – correspondent (2008–2020)
- Ogni mattina (TV8) – pet column (2020)

=== Radio ===
- L'altro sport (Top Italia Network)

=== Film ===
- Do You Like Hitchcock?, directed by Dario Argento
- Casomai, directed by Alessandro D'Alatri
- Sarai, directed by Franco Calmi

== Books ==
- Stoppa, Edoardo (2011). Per fortuna che ci sei: Duda e gli altri fratelli animali che mi hanno cambiato la vita (in Italian). Milan: Mondadori. ISBN 978-88-04-60727-4. (On his work with animals).
- Stoppa, Edoardo (2013). Quattro zampe e un amore (novel) (in Italian). Milan: Mondadori. ISBN 978-88-04-63228-3.
