= Smiling Maniacs =

- Directed by: Marcello Aliprandi
- Written by: Ugo Betti (play); Marcello Aliprandi; Gianfranco Clerici; Fernando Imbert
- Starring: Franco Nero
- Cinematography: Gastone Di Giovanni
- Music by: Pino Donaggio
- Release date: 1975
- Country: Italy
- Language: Italian

Smiling Maniacs (Italian: Corruzione al palazzo di giustizia) is a 1975 Italian drama crime film. It stars actor Franco Nero.

It is an adaptation of the 1949 play by Ugo Betti. The film is sometimes referred to as Bribery in High Places.

== Cast ==
- Franco Nero as Judge Dani
- Fernando Rey as Judge Vanini
- Martin Balsam as Carlo Goja
- Gabriele Ferzetti as Prandó
- Umberto Orsini as Erzi
- Mara Danaud as Flavia
- Giovanna Benedetto as Elena Vanini
- Umberto D'Orsi as Excellence

== Reception ==
In a contemporary review, Maurizio Porro described the film as "a work full of good intentions, but torn by a contradiction" which makes it lose its effectiveness, as everything that in the original play was "enblemic, Kafkaesque, not situated in a specific place, in the film becomes concrete denunciation of the current problematics of our [Italian] institutions." Similarly, a La Stampa review noted how the film was "not able to adapt [the original play] in terms of pure symbolism" and turned to be "a bit uncertain in tone (between Betti and a legal giallo, with mandatory elements such as smoke fog, drugs and killers)."

According to film historian Roberto Curti, the film was "rooted in the paranoid atmosphere of the period", an "attempt at making something closer to Elio Petri and Francesco Rosi's political allegories based on Leonardo Sciascia novels", but with Aliprandi "not always able to keep all these elements in focus."

The film grossed about 700 million lire, and was Aliprandi's highest-grossing film in his career.
