= You and the Night =

2013 film by Yann Gonzalez

- Theatrical release poster
- French: Les Rencontres d'après minuit
- Directed by: Yann Gonzalez
- Screenplay by: Yann Gonzalez; Rebecca Zlotowski (scenario consultant)
- Produced by: Cécile Vacheret
- Starring: Kate Moran; Niels Schneider; Nicolas Maury; Eric Cantona; Fabienne Babe; Alain-Fabien Delon; Julie Brémond; Béatrice Dalle
- Cinematography: Simon Beaufils
- Edited by: Raphaël Lefèvre
- Music by: M83
- Production companies: Sedna Films; Garidi Films
- Distributed by: Potemkine Films
- Release dates: 20 May 2013 (Cannes); 13 November 2013 (France)
- Running time: 91 minutes
- Country: France
- Language: French
- Budget: €570,000

You and the Night (French: Les Rencontres d'après minuit, lit. 'Encounters After Midnight') is a 2013 French erotic comedy-drama film written and directed by Yann Gonzalez, featuring music by his brother Anthony Gonzalez's band M83.

Former Manchester United football player Eric Cantona was cast as The Stud.

== Plot ==
In a pouring rainstorm, a hysterical Ali sits on the back of a motorcycle of a driver whose helmet obscures his face, begging him to wait for Matthias, who appears, only for the driver to depart before he can get on the back. Ali demands to know who the driver is, but he does not say, and so she feels his lips and inside his mouth, and she apparently recognizes him.

Next, Matthias lies unconscious in a snowstorm, and is found by Ali and Udo, their transvestite maid. The two frantically kiss and masturbate Matthias in an attempt to revive him, which succeeds. Once he is awake, they help Matthias to their apartment, where tells them that he has been to the land of the dead, and that it is ruled by cruel and angry children, whose rage at their early deaths have stripped them of their humanity. Ali consoles him, and Udo reminds the two that their scheduled orgy is about to begin.

The first guest to arrive is the Slut, who expects sex immediately, but is informed she must wait. Shortly thereafter, the Stud and the Teen arrive together. Curious, Udo asks them to tell about themselves, and the Slut reveals she has always had strong sexual desires, implying she is a nymphomaniac. She tells of a dream in which she wandered through countless rooms filled with naked men, only to be met with the spirit of her deceased mother in the final room, which she had on the second anniversary of her mother's untimely passing.

The Stud explains that he always was a poet from a young age, but that puberty diverted him from his passion by causing him to have an enormous penis, which quickly became the talk of his small town. He also reveals that he was detained only hours earlier, having been arrested by fake policemen, only for a woman dressed in a Soviet military uniform to sexually degrade him and herself while the policemen watch and masturbate. As he is led out through a series of cells filled with screaming people while blindfolded, the Stud is stopped by a woman begging to be saved, but he is dragged away before he can help her. He headed directly for the orgy after this.

The stories are interrupted by the arrival of the Star, who demands they turn the lights out and that every make love in the dark so as to avoid revealing her face to anyone. At first, the group complies, and the orgy seems set to begin, but while the Star and the Teen kiss, the Slut turns on the light, prompting the Star to hide herself, despondent. Eventually, the group convinces her to stay, with the Teen saying he could feel her very soul while they kissed.

Moments later, two policemen arrive, and the guests, along with Ali and Matthias, hide, while Udo answers the door. The officers show her a photo of the Teen, saying he is a missing minor. Udo denies having seen him, but comments on his beauty, prompting one of the officers to sexually threaten her, but the Star intervenes, saying she is the lady of the house who values her privacy. The policemen depart, and Udo, still shaken by the aggressive officer, demands an explanation from the Teen.

The Teen explains that he ran away from home weeks ago after he began feeling an irresistible call to the night, going out to cruise for sex with men and women, drinking, and wandering the empty streets. His parents attempted to control his wanderings, and so he left, and has been living nomadically, sleeping where he can and having his lovers buy him food or give him money. Everyone asks about the story of the hosts, which all three of them tell.

Centuries ago, Ali and Matthias were young lovers in the midst of a wildly passionate affair. Ali, normally very stoic, is moved to tears of joy by a particularly amazing day, and she makes Matthias promise he will again make her cry such tears. The relationship is interrupted, however, by Matthias being called to war. Two months after he departs, Matthias is killed in battle, and a despondent Ali spends countless hours staring at his grave. At sunset, Udo, dressed as a gypsy, appears, saying she carries a message from Matthias from beyond the grave, and that it is within her power to bring him back, but only on one condition.

Udo says that Ali and Matthias' relationship is the most passionate she has ever seen, and that, in exchange for bringing back Matthias, she would be allowed to join the two of them as both an observer and participant. Udo goes on to say that she is immortal, and, so long as they are with her, the two lovers will also be immortal. She explains that Matthias' life depends on Ali's desire, and, should she ever fall out of love with him, or cease to desire him, Matthias will die. Ali accepts the terms, and the three proceed to live together for the next several centuries.

Matthias says that sharing the stories has brought him a calm he hasn't known in ages, and that he is able to coexist between the land of the dead and the living in this calm. He remarks that he believes he loves all of the guests, and that he finds them all beautiful. Everyone then is served drinks, which prompts a group hallucination, during which Ali and the Teen kiss, and Matthias departs both the hallucination and the room the others are in.

During the hallucination, the Star tells her own story, that she and her son were deeply in love with one another, but her son would not allow them to consummate their desire, instead promising that they would the next night for many months. Eventually, the two did finally engage in sex, but, the morning after, the Star's son vanished, and she has been searching for him ever since.

The experience is interrupted by the Slut calling out for her mother to return as Matthias did for Ali, which prompts the arrival of a hooded figure with a mirror for a face. At first, the figure speaks with the Slut's mother's voice, giving her name, age, and cause of death, but quickly begins speaking in countless other voices, telling of hundreds of people and how they died. Furious, Ali punches the mirror, and sees Matthias' face behind it. Rushing to their bedroom, she finds him, having slit his throat with the mirror there. Despite her best efforts, Ali cannot revive him. The group, now all racked by grief, then engages in their orgy in the living room.

Afterwards, Ali and Udo escort the guests out. Udo consoles the Slut to find joy in her nymphomania, while the Teen and the Star exchange jewelry as tokens of affection, and the Stud offers his jacket to Ali. Ali goes over to the Teen, and places her fingers in his mouth, realizing he is the driver from the motorcycle. Concerned for where he will next go, Udo and Ali walk with the Teen for a while, before he goes to depart as the sun rises. Ali asks what the Teen's name is, which he reveals as Sacha. Tearfully, Ali and Udo express that they have come to care for him greatly, and offer immortality and the chance to stay with them, not as a replacement for Matthias, but as a new family. Sacha does not answer, but instead only smiles at the rising sun.

== Cast ==
- Kate Moran as Ali
- Niels Schneider as Matthias
- Nicolas Maury as Udo
- Eric Cantona as The Stud
- Fabienne Babe as The Star
- Julie Brémond as The Slut
- Alain-Fabien Delon as The Teen/Sacha
- Béatrice Dalle as commissioner
- Jean-Christophe Bouvet as brigadier-chief
- Pierre-Vincent Chapus as deputy brigadier
- Dominique Bettenfeld as policeman
