= River Bank (film) =

- French: Un monde ailleurs
- Directed by: Étienne Faure
- Written by: Étienne Faure
- Produced by: Stéphane Gizard; Étienne Faure
- Starring: Paul Bartel; Émile Berling; Alain-Fabien Delon
- Cinematography: Thomas Migevant
- Edited by: Étienne Faure; Alexis Mallard
- Production companies: Eivissa Production; Bushwick Factory
- Release date: 7 October 2020
- Running time: 90 minutes
- Countries: France; United States
- Language: French

River Bank (French: Un monde ailleurs) is a 2020 French-American thriller drama film directed by Étienne Faure.

== Plot ==
In the heart of a secluded South American rainforest, "Un monde ailleurs" unfolds as a group of five boys embark on a challenging trek to find a mysterious healer. Faced with an injury, their journey takes an unexpected turn when they become stranded along the banks of a fast-flowing river. On the opposite shore lies an unusual camp occupied by three girls. Despite their proximity, a formidable barrier prevents both crossing and communication.

== Cast ==
- Pierre Prieur as Pierre
- Paul Bartel as Tom
- Émile Berling as John
- Alain-Fabien Delon as Charlie
- Ernst Umhauer as William
