= The Monk (1972 film) =

The Monk (Le Moine)
- Directed by: Ado Kyrou
- Written by: Luis Buñuel; Jean-Claude Carrière
- Produced by: Henry Lange; Zack Norman
- Starring: Franco Nero; Nathalie Delon; Nicol Williamson
- Cinematography: Sacha Vierny
- Edited by: Eric Pluet
- Music by: Piero Piccioni
- Release date: 1972
- Countries: France; Belgium; Italy; West Germany
- Languages: French; English

The Monk (French: Le Moine, Iteri: Il monaco, German: Der Mönch und die Frauen) is a 1972 Gothic film directed by Ado Kyrou. A co-production between France, Belgium, Italy and West Germany, it is based on the 1796 eponymous novel written by Matthew Gregory Lewis.

== Plot ==
Set in medieval Madrid, Spain, a charismatic monk named Ambrosio preaches to a riveted congregation. Among the congregation are the precocious and beautiful Antonia and her aunt Leonora. The Duke of Talamur struts and boasts of the oratorical power and unshakeable virtues of The Monk, Ambrosio, to the ladies.

In the monastery-nunnery complex, Ambrosio exposes a note sent to one of the nuns named Agnes that exposes a love affair and her pregnancy. Disgraced, she begs Ambrosio for her life but is refused and removed from the order.

A young monk named "John" is close to Ambrosio but reveals herself to actually be Matilda, a beautiful woman with long blonde hair. She professes her love for Ambrosio. Shocked, Ambrosio is thrown into a crisis of faith and becomes ill. He initially rejects Matilda's pleas and advances, but then seeing her torment and attempts at suicide, they embrace and make love.

Ambrosio visits Elvira, a sick woman in the community who is the mother of Antonia. The impressionable Antonia looks up to Ambrosio, and they become close. Now having broken his vows with Matilda, Ambrosio feels at liberty to go further and forces himself upon Antonia until interrupted and embarrassed by Elvira's entry. She sends him away and tells him not to come back.

Although Matilda is disappointed in Ambrosio's loss of interest in her, she persuades him to let her summon the Occult to seduce Antonia. Ambrosio is reluctant to have any association with the Occult but relents in his lust for Antonia when Matilda shows him Antonia in the present via an enchanted mirror. In the crypts, Matilda tells Ambrosio to remain within a circle of fire and dons a bright, glittering dress before summoning a demonic spirit with a glowing symbol on his chest. Now enchanted, Antonia sleeps while Ambrosio sneaks into her room and attempts to rape her. However, he is once again interrupted by Elvira. The two fight until Ambrosio strangles her to death.

There are pointless and confusing scenes of Matilda with her apparent friend and benefactor, the Duke of Talamur, at a castle during feasts. The Duke treats his staff and animals very poorly as part of his idea of sport. Ambrosio prostrates himself in a cave on the Duke's estate.

Antonia is kidnapped by the Duke's men and brought to the castle where Ambrosio tries to comfort her and then rape her once more. However, in the struggle, she is killed.

The Spanish Inquisition appears and arrests Ambrosio and Matilda, initially also arresting the Duke before freeing him. It is revealed that Agnes is still alive and had been chained up in the castle, traumatised by the death of her child and her lover. Meanwhile, Ambrosio is faced with terrible tortures and being burned alive at the hands of the Inquisition. He sees that Matilda has been beaten too and loses his spirit. However, Matilda visits him in his cell, once again wearing a bright, glittering dress as part of her Occult persona. She persuades Ambrosio that his soul is already damned to hell and that he should sign it away in exchange for his freedom, which he eventually does.

The Inquisition guards enter the room and tell Ambrosio he is now free to go, leaving him in awe. Emerging into a surral scene at St. Peter's Square in Rome, with a large crowd gathered wearing modern 1970s-era clothes, Ambrosio greets the crowd as the newest Pope.

== Cast ==
- Franco Nero as Ambrosio
- Nathalie Delon as Mathilde
- Nadja Tiller as Elvira
- Élisabeth Wiener as Agnès
- Eliana De Santis as Antonia
- Nicol Williamson as Duke of Talamur
- Agnès Capri
- Maria Machado
