= Do You Like Hitchcock? =

2005 television film by Dario Argento

- Promotional poster
- Italian: Ti piace Hitchcock?
- Genre: Horror
- Written by: Dario Argento; Franco Ferrini
- Directed by: Dario Argento
- Starring: Elio Germano; Chiara Conti
- Music by: Pino Donaggio
- Countries of origin: Spain; Italy
- Original languages: Italian; English

Production
- Producers: Carlo Bixio; Joan Antoni Gonzales I Serret
- Cinematography: Frederic Fasano
- Editor: Walter Fasano
- Running time: 93 minutes

Original release
- Release: 2005

Do You Like Hitchcock? (Italian: Ti piace Hitchcock?) is a 2005 horror television film co-written and directed by Dario Argento. The film is a homage to thriller film director Alfred Hitchcock.

== Plot ==
Giulio, a film student, spies on Sasha, an attractive neighbor, and rents Fritz Lang films for his thesis. He sees Sasha at the video store. She tries to rent Alfred Hitchcock's Strangers on a Train at the same time as another woman, Federica. The two strike up a friendship. The next day, riding his bicycle, Giulio sees Sasha and Federica having furtive conversation by a fountain.

An intruder uses a key to enter Sasha's apartment while her mother is home alone and murders her with a brass pestle. Giulio is awakened that night by the police investigation as they question Sasha.

Giulio reads the newspaper and finds out that Sasha Zerboni was an only child and her mother was a wealthy widow. He tells his girlfriend Arianna that he suspects Sasha and Federica are in an agreement similar to the one in Strangers on a Train.

Giulio goes across the street and finds a cleaning crew mopping up the crime scene. He snatches a letter out of the mailbox: a bank statement showing almost 1 million Euros in the Zerboni account. Back at his apartment, his mother tells him about her new fiancé. Upon Sasha's return, the cleaning crew chief tells her about Giulio's visit.

Someone breaks into Giulio's apartment. The intruder breaks an empty wine bottle and flees when Giulio hears the noise. Giulio calls Arianna and asks her to spend the night because he's nervous. When Giulio hypothesizes that it is Sasha's turn to kill someone close to Federica (à la Strangers on a Train), Arianna says he is crazy. The next day, Andrea, the video store clerk, tells Giulio Sasha had been in and asked about him, saying she knew he watched her.

The following day, Andrea asks Giulio to mind the video store while he steps out. While Andrea is away, he looks up Federica's address on the store computer.

Giulio rides his motorbike to Federica's apartment and follows her to her workplace. At the end of the day, Federica disconsolately leaves with her boss. Giulio follows them to the boss's apartment and sees them arguing in a second-floor window. The boss is blackmailing Federica for sexual favors over money she stole from a client. He spots Giulio looking through the window. Giulio scampers back down the ledge, but falls and fractures his ankle. He limps to his motorbike, barely escaping.

The doctor tells Giulio he'll have to be in a cast for several weeks. Arianna comes over to help him mend. When he tells her his theory that Federica wants Sasha to kill her boss, Arianna says he's crazier than ever and storms out.

Andrea comes by, ostensibly to visit Giulio while he's laid up, and tries to drown him in the tub. While Giulio and Andrea are struggling, Giulio's mother and her fiancé come to visit. Hearing the screams, the fiancé breaks down the door and pulls Andrea off Giulio. Andrea flees into the street and is fatally hit by a car.

The police arrest Sasha. Arianna comes over and she and Giulio make up. Giulio explains that Sasha hired Andrea to kill her mother. Arianna sees a woman dressed in black approaching Sasha's apartment. Arianna chases after her to see what she's doing. Giulio sees through his binoculars that the woman is Federica in disguise. She is looking for the key which she left in Sasha's apartment. Giulio realizes Federica was the real killer; Andrea must have joined them later. Giulio calls Arianna on her cell phone, but she refuses to give up the pursuit.

Giulio calls the inspector, who arrives at Sasha's apartment before Arianna has a chance to confront Federica. They chase her up to the rooftop. Federica slips off the edge of the building, but the inspector catches her by the arm. The inspector and Arianna haul Federica to safety, and she is placed under arrest.

In the final scene, Giulio's cast is off, and he gets a phone call from his mother. While they talk, he sees another beautiful woman who has taken residence in Sasha's former apartment. She is almost naked and reading a book on the couch (The Window at the White Cat by Mary Roberts Rinehart, in the Italian translation Una finestra sulla notte, literally "a window to the night"). She sees Giulio watching but doesn't seem to mind.

== Cast ==
- Elio Germano as Giulio
- Chiara Conti as Federica Lalli
- Elisabetta Rocchetti as Sasha Zerboni
- Cristina Brondo as Arianna
- Ivan Morales as Andrea
- Edoardo Stoppa as Inspector
- Elena Maria Bellini as Giulio's Mother

== Reception ==
Ed Gonzalez gave the film two and a half stars in Slant Magazine, describing it as "ambitious for a small-screen enterprise, preferable to the embarrassment of 1998's The Phantom of the Opera but still a pale imitation of the director's early giallos." He identified the gruesome murders and the motor scooter chase sequence as the highlights.

The film was nominated for Best TV-Movie at the 2006 Barcelona Film Awards.
