= Hideous Bastard =

Studio album by Oliver Sim
- Released: 9 September 2022
- Length: 34:11
- Label: Young
- Producer: Jamie xx

Singles from Hideous Bastard
- 1. "Romance with a Memory" Released: 10 March 2022; 2. "Fruit" Released: 6 April 2022; 3. "Hideous" Released: 23 May 2022; 4. "GMT" Released: 7 July 2022; 5. "Run the Credits" Released: 8 September 2022

Hideous Bastard is the debut album by the xx singer Oliver Sim, released on 9 September 2022 by Young. The album was produced by Sim's bandmate Jamie xx. It was released with a short film directed by Yann Gonzalez, which premiered at the 2022 Cannes Film Festival. The album centers themes of queerness, including Sim's experiences with HIV.

== Release ==
Two singles were released prior to the album's announcement. "Romance with a Memory", Sim's debut solo single, was released on 10 March 2022 with a music video featuring drag queens Charity Kase, HoSo Terra Toma, and Gena Marvin.

The second single, "Fruit", was released on 6 April with a music video directed by Yann Gonzalez. The music video depicts Sim as a guest on a talk show, singing the song in response to the host asking him "If you could meet yourself as a kid right now, what would you say?" "Fruit" is the first song Sim ever released where he used male pronouns, a practice he and xx bandmate Romy intentionally avoided in their work with the group. Sim and Gonzalez discussed their influences behind the video, including inner child therapy, Steven Spielberg, Poltergeist, Dario Argento, and late-night television series like Eurotrash, Queer as Folk, and The Graham Norton Show. The wardrobe for the video was styled by Celestine Cooney, with inspiration taken from David Byrne's "big suit" from Stop Making Sense. An orchestral version of "Fruit" was released on 4 August 2023 for the soundtrack of the film Red, White & Royal Blue.

The album was announced on 23 May with a release date of 9 September by Young. In a press release, Sim revealed that he was diagnosed HIV positive when he was 17. The third single, "Hideous", was released the same day, with lyrics addressing Sim's experience with HIV and a guest feature from Bronski Beat vocalist and HIV/AIDS activist Jimmy Somerville.

The fourth single, "GMT", was released on 7 July. The song features a sample of the track "Smile Backing Vocals Montage" from the Beach Boys compilation album The Smile Sessions, and was inspired by Sim and Jamie xx's trip to Sydney and Byron Bay, Australia. Sim said the song was about "pining over a love back home, thousands of miles apart on different time zones", and was "also a love letter to London." A Jamie xx remix of "GMT", with additional production by Floating Points, was released on 22 August, and was nominated for Best Independent Remix at the 2023 AIM Independent Music Awards. The fifth single, "Run the Credits", was released on 8 September, and sees Sim singing about identifying with movie villains such as Patrick Bateman and Buffalo Bill and final girls from horror films.

== Short film ==
On 11 August, Sim released the trailer for his short film Hideous. The short, directed by Yann Gonzalez, is a three-part horror musical about a young queer boy living with HIV. It includes footage from the "Hideous" video, and its premise of Sim as the guest on a talk show. Sim stars in the film which also features Jamie xx as the Sound Guy, Jimmy Somerville as the Guardian Angel, and drag queen Bimini as the Queen of Doom, as well as Fehinti Balogun, César Vicente, and Kate Moran. The film was shot in London, and premiered at the 2022 Cannes Film Festival on 22 May before releasing exclusively on Mubi on 8 September.

== Reception ==
Hideous Bastard ratings
Aggregate scores
Source	Rating
AnyDecentMusic?	7.7/10
Metacritic	80/100
Review scores
Source	Rating
Beats Per Minute	72%
The Daily Telegraph	4/5 stars
DIY	5/5 stars
The Guardian	3/5 stars
The Line of Best Fit	9/10
MusicOMH	4/5 stars
NME	4/5 stars
Pitchfork	6.5/10
PopMatters	7/10
Slant Magazine	4/5 stars

According to the review aggregator Metacritic, Hideous Bastard received "generally favorable reviews" based on a weighted average score of 80 out of 100 from 12 critic scores.

=== Awards ===
Hideous Bastard awards and nominations
Year	Organization	Award	Work	Status	Ref.
2023	AIM Independent Music Awards	Best Independent Album	Hideous Bastard	Nominated	
2023	AIM Independent Music Awards	Best Independent Remix	"GMT" (Jamie xx Remix)	Nominated	

=== Year-end lists ===
Hideous Bastard on year-end lists
Publication	#	Ref.
Clash	11	
Dazed	13	
Double J	23	
The Guardian	41	
Les Inrockuptibles	27	
Loud and Quiet	26	
MusicOMH	43	
NME	44	
Nylon	—N/a	
The Sunday Times	24	

== Track listing ==
All lyrics are written by Oliver Sim with others noted; all music is composed by Sim and James Smith with others noted.

Hideous Bastard track listing
No.	Title	Lyrics	Music	Length
1.	"Hideous" (featuring Jimmy Somerville)	Somerville	Lee Hazlewood (Note: From a sample of the Hazlewood song "Your Sweet Love".)	4:23
2.	"Romance with a Memory"		Sam Dees (Note: From a sample of the Dees song "Lonely for You Baby".); William Crump	2:58
3.	"Sensitive Child"	Smith; Del Shannon (Note: From a sample of the Shannon song "Breakup".)	Shannon	3:02
4.	"Never Here"			3:38
5.	"Unreliable Narrator"			2:12
6.	"Saccharine"			3:14
7.	"Confident Man"			3:51
8.	"GMT"	Brian Douglas Wilson (Note: From a sample of the Wilson song "Smile Backing Vocals Montage".); Van Dyke Parks	Wilson; Parks	3:08
9.	"Fruit"	Smith; Alex Peringer		3:24
10.	"Run the Credits"	Wilson; Parks	Wilson; Parks; James Fountain (Note: From a sample of the Fountain song "Seven Day Lover".)	4:21
Total length:				34:11

== Personnel ==
- Oliver Sim – vocals, bass guitar, guitar, synth bass
- Jamie xx – producer, drums, programming, synthesiser, piano
- David Wrench – mixing engineer, additional programming
- Jimmy Somerville – vocals (1), backing vocals (7, 9)
- John Davis – recording engineer (1, 4–7, 10), mastering
- Lexxx – recording engineer (1, 4–7, 10)
- Alex Dromgoole – recording engineer (2, 3, 8, 9)
- Andrew Sarlo – additional production (3)
- Joe Winter – additional backing vocals (10)
- Casper Sejersen – photography
- Vasilis Marmatakis – design, album cover
- Kostis Sohoritis – additional photography
- Rana Toofanian – creative director
- Sarah Jayne-Todd – art director

== Charts ==
Chart performance for Hideous Bastard
Chart (2022)	Peak position
Belgian Albums (Ultratop Flanders)	88
French Albums (SNEP)	195
German Albums (Offizielle Top 100)	66
Scottish Albums (OCC)	9
Swiss Albums (Schweizer Hitparade)	59
UK Albums (OCC)	58
UK Independent Albums (OCC)	2
