= Alain-Fabien Delon =

French actor, model, writer (born 1994)

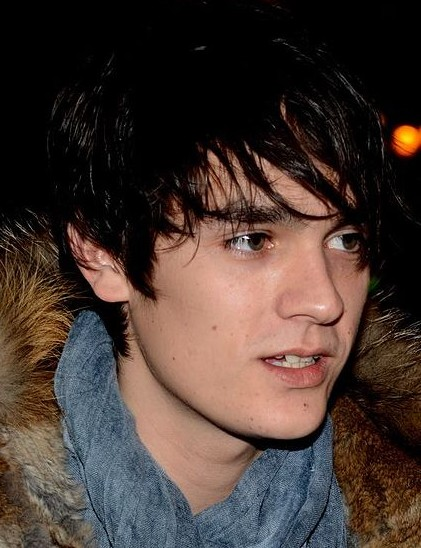
- Delon in 2014
- Born: 18 March 1994 (age 32); Gien, Loiret, France
- Other name: "Alain Delon Jr"
- Citizenship: French
- Occupations: Model; actor; novelist
- Children: 1
- Father: Alain Delon
- Relatives: Anouchka Delon (sister); Anthony Delon (half-brother); Christian Aaron Boulogne (half-brother)

Alain-Fabien Delon (born 18 March 1994) is a French model, actor and writer.

He is the son of French actor Alain Delon and Dutch former model and television presenter and journalist, Rosalie van Breemen.

== Early life ==
Alain-Fabien Delon's father, Alain Delon, was a French actor, and his mother is Rosalie van Breemen, a former model who became a Dutch television presenter and journalist. He has a sister, Anouchka Delon, and two older half-brothers, Anthony Delon, and Christian Aaron Boulogne.

== Career ==
In 2013, Delon played in Les Rencontres d'après minuit.

In 2014, he appeared in the short film Der Doppelganger by Julien Landais for Vogue Italia.

Since 2015, he has been a brand ambassador for Dior.

In 2016, he portrayed a young homeless person in the fourth episode of the series Capitaine Marleau, titled Brouillard en thalasso.

In 2019, he published a novel titled De la race des seigneurs, with Stock.

== Personal life ==
From 2017 to 2020, Delon was in a relationship with television host and actress Capucine Anav.

Delon is currently in a relationship with model Laura Bensadoun. On April 29, 2025, the couple welcomed their first child, a daughter named Romy.

== Filmography ==
=== Cinema ===
==== Feature films ====
- 2011: Je m'appelle Bernadette by Jean Sagols (Alain-Fabien)
- 2013: Les Rencontres d'après minuit by Yann Gonzalez (the teenager)
- 2018: Une jeunesse dorée by Eva Ionesco (Adrien)
- 2020: Un monde ailleurs by Étienne Faure (Charlie)
- 2023: Jours sauvages by David Lanzmann (Manu)
- Upcoming: Ultra Pure by Ulla Fudge (Venus)

==== Short films ====
- 2014: Der Doppelganger by Julien Landais

=== Television ===
==== Television series ====
- 2002: Fabio Montale (Thomas )
- 2016: Capitaine Marleau (Marin Cibié)
- 2020: Grand Hôtel (Xavier Vasseur)
- 2021: I3P by Jérémy Minui (Lionel Poupinel / Arlequin / Adrien Ganz)
