= Marcello Aliprandi =

Italian film director (1934–1997)

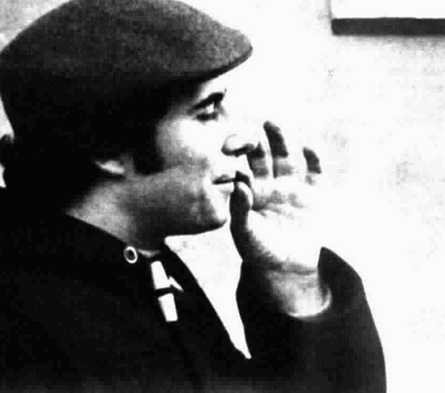
- Aliprandi in July 1972
- Born: 2 January 1934; Rome, Italy
- Died: 26 August 1997 (aged 63); Rome, Italy
- Occupation: Film director
- Years active: 1960–1997

Marcello Aliprandi (2 January 1934 – 26 August 1997) was an Italian film director. In addition to his work in television and the theater, he directed seven feature films, including Smiling Maniacs (1975) and Vatican Conspiracy (1982).

== Early life ==
Aliprandi was born in Rome to an Italian father and an Armenian mother.

== Career ==
In the mid-1950s, Aliprandi left university to enroll at the Silvio D'Amico art academy. After graduating, he became an assistant to Luchino Visconti, working with him both in the theater and as assistant director for the 1963 film The Leopard. Later during the 1960s, Aliprandi worked mainly in theater and as a member of the Compagnia dei giovani (Company of Young People), directing various plays and operas. He returned to film in 1968 as an assistant director for Alberto Lattuada's Fraulein Doktor.

The first feature film directed by Aliprandi was the 1970 science-fiction film La ragazza di latta (The Tin Girl), for which he also co-wrote the screenplay. Aliprandi received good critical reviews for La ragazza, as well as for his next two films—1974's Corruzione al palazzo di giustizia (Corruption at the Palace of Justice, released in the United States as Smiling Maniacs) and 1976's Un sussurro nel buio (A Whisper in the Dark). But only one of the three, Smiling Maniacs, was a commercial success. Aliprandi's last film in the 1970s, Senza buccia (Skin Deep) (1979), was both a critical and commercial failure.

For the entire 1980s, Aliprandi mostly worked in television and the theater. His television work included the three-part musical Hollywood Hello, qui, Broadway!, which featured choreographer Bob Fosse playing himself (Aliprandi and Fosse had met while Aliprandi was visiting the United States). It also included Tennessee Williams' The Glass Menagerie. The only feature film that Aliprandi made during this period was 1982's Morte in Vaticano (Death in the Vatican). As with his previous feature film, it was a commercial failure.

Along with friend Lino Patruno, Aliprandi founded the production company Movietone of Italy in the early 1990s. His final two films were 1992's Prova di Memoria (Memory Test, released in the United States as Crimson Dawn) and 1994's Soldato Ignato (Unknown Soldier). The latter film saw little distribution, being screened only at two film festivals— one in Italy and the other at Brazil's Festival de Gramado. For the Italian screening, Aliprandi's directing credit was given as "Daniel Ford".

In assessing Aliprandi's career, film historian Roberto Curti noted that his early association with Visconti lent Aliprandi a certain level of respect within the Italian film industry. However, he also noted that Aliprandi never achieved great critical success. Curti attributed this largely to Aliprandi's directorial style, which he described as "often too weird and artistically compromised". He added that, except for Senza buccia (Skin Deep), Aliprandi's films were "personal and technically competent" and dealt with fantasy elements in ways that were "original and idiosyncratic".

== Directing credits ==
=== Film ===
- The Tin Girl (1970), a science fiction film starring Sydne Rome.
- Smiling Maniacs (1974), a protest film starring Franco Nero, Martin Balsam and Fernando Rey. It was based on the same-named play by Ugo Betti.
- A Whisper in the Dark (Un sussurro nel buio, 1976), a psychological thriller starring John Phillip Law and Joseph Cotten.
- Skin Deep (1979), a comedy about nudism based on Ugo Liberatore's screenplay. It starred Ilona Staller.
- Vatican Conspiracy (1982), a religious fantasy loosely inspired by the death of Pope John Paul I. It featured Terence Stamp and Fabrizio Bentivoglio.
- Crimson Dawn (1992), a thriller set in Prague starring Franco Nero.
- Unknown Soldier (1995), a fantasy drama about World War II.

Five of these films had their musical scores written by Pino Donaggio. The two that did not were the very first (The Tin Girl) and 1992's Crimson Dawn.

=== Television ===
NOTE: This listing is incomplete.

- Quasi Davvero (1978)
- Hello Hollywood, qui Broadway! (1981), a musical starring Bob Fosse
- La mano indemoniata (The Possessed Hand) (1981), a fantasy by Massimo Bontempelli featuring Cochi Ponzoni
- The Glass Menagerie (1983)
- I ragazzi della valle misteriosa (Boys of the Mysterious Valley) (1984), starring Kim Rossi Stuart and Alessandro Haber.
- Quando ancora non c'erano i Beatles (Even When There Weren't the Beatles) (1988), a musical miniseries featuring Lucrezia Lante della Rovere and Anita Ekberg. Aliprandi co-wrote the screenplay.

=== Stage ===
NOTE: This listing is incomplete.

- Caro Bugiardo (Dear Liar) (1962), four performances staged at the Teatro La Fenice in Venice. Alliprandi was an assistant director.
- My Fair Lady (1964), single performance staged at the Teatro La Fenice. Alliprandi was a co-director.
- L'Isola (The Island) (1964), staged at the Festival dei due mondi in Spoleto.
