= Anouchka Delon =

French-Dutch actress

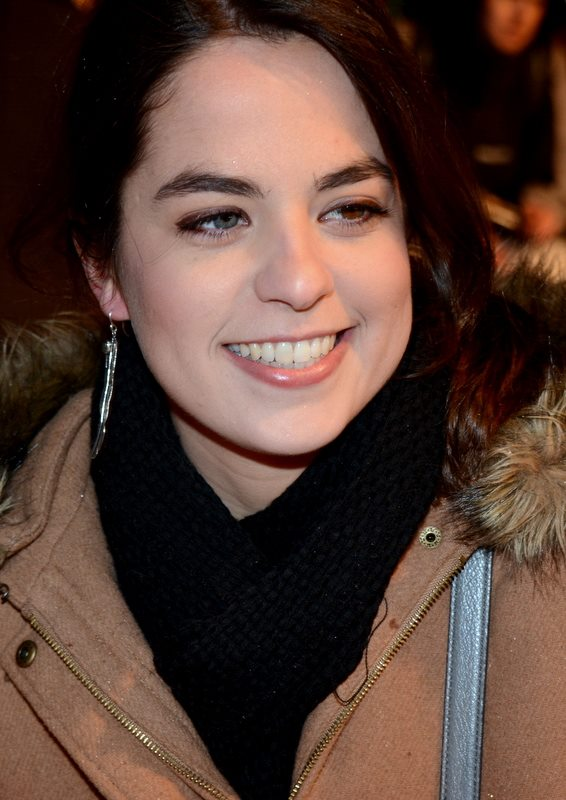
- Delon in 2014
- Born: 25 November 1990 (age 35); Gien, Loiret, France
- Occupation: Actress
- Spouse: Julien Dereims (m. 2021)
- Children: 1
- Father: Alain Delon
- Relatives: Alain-Fabien Delon (brother); Anthony Delon (half-brother)

Anouchka Delon (born 25 November 1990) is a French-Dutch actress.

== Early life ==
Delon is the daughter of Alain Delon and Rosalie van Breemen. She has a younger brother, Alain-Fabien Delon, and one older paternal half-brother, Anthony Delon, from her father's marriage to actress and model Nathalie Delon. She has heterochromia, with one brown eye and one blue eye. In 2008, she was presented to society at Le Bal des débutantes in Paris.

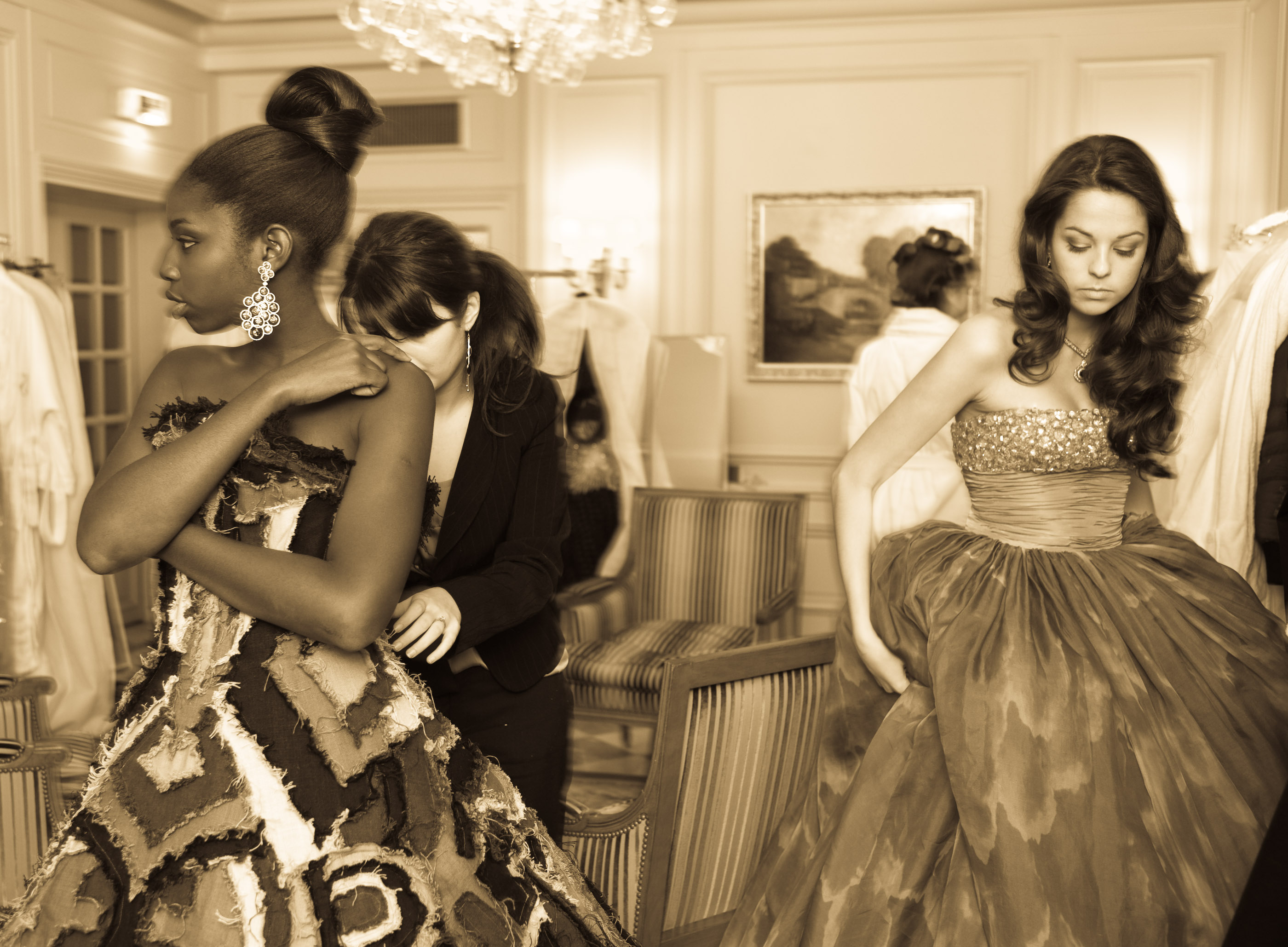
Delon (right) as a debutante in Paris

== Career ==
At age 12, Delon appeared alongside her father in the TV film Le Lion, an adaptation of the novel by Joseph Kessel. From 2007 to 2010, she trained at the Cours Simon in Paris. In 2011, she performed with her father on stage at the Théâtre des Bouffes-Parisiens.

In 2015, Delon was a participant in the game show Fort Boyard.

== Personal life ==
In November 2019, it was announced Delon was expecting a child with her boyfriend Julien Dereims. Their son was born on 15 February 2020. They have been married since 2021.

== Filmography ==
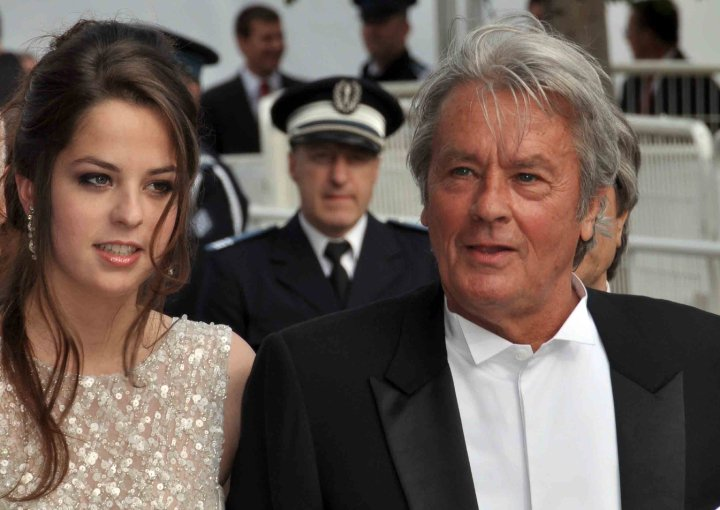
Anouchka Delon with Alain Delon at the 2010 Cannes Film Festival

=== Film ===
- 2025: Le Café de Mes Souvenirs

=== Television ===
- 2003 : Le Lion de José Pinheiro (TV film) : Patricia Bullitt
- 2011 : Amour et sexe sous l'occupation d'Isabelle Clarke et Daniel Costelle (Documentary): Narration
- 2011 : L'occupation intime d'Isabelle Clarke et Daniel Costelle (Documentary): Narration
- 2014 : Une journée ordinaire (Captation), France 2

=== Theater ===
- 2011 : Une journée ordinaire d'Éric Assous, mise en scène Jean-Luc Moreau, Théâtre des Bouffes-Parisiens
- 2014-2015 : Une journée ordinaire d'Éric Assous, mise en scène Anne Bourgeois, Tournée.
- 2015 : Hibernatus by Jean Bernard-Luc, directed by Steve Suissa, Théâtre de la Michodière
