= The Inner Scar =

- Theatrical release poster
- French: La cicatrice intérieure
- Directed by: Philippe Garrel
- Written by: Philippe Garrel
- Starring: Philippe Garrel; Pierre Clémenti; Nico
- Cinematography: Michel Fournier
- Edited by: Philippe Garrel
- Music by: Nico
- Distributed by: Capital Films
- Release date: 2 February 1972 (France)
- Running time: 60 minutes
- Country: France
- Languages: English; German; French

The Inner Scar (French: La cicatrice intérieure) is a 1972 French surrealist film directed by Philippe Garrel, who co-stars with Nico, her son Christian Aaron Boulogne and Pierre Clémenti. It was filmed in Egypt, the United States and Iceland. The film features five songs written and performed by Nico: "Abschied", "Janitor of Lunacy", "My Only Child", "All That Is My Own" and "König". Originally released in 1972, it was re-released in 2005. In 2011, it was released on DVD paired with Garrel's 1983 film Liberté, la nuit. French film archivist Henri Langlois called the film a "masterpiece".
