= Special Security Directorate =

Anti-communist division of the Hellenic Gendarmerie (1929-1944)

The Special Security Directorate (Greek: Διεύθυνση Ειδικής Ασφαλείας του Κράτους) was a special division of the Hellenic Gendarmerie active between 1929 and 1944. Originally established to break up communist organizations, it became known for its collaboration with the Nazis during World War II, after Greece was occupied in 1941.

Many officers serving in the Special Security Directorate were involved in torturing and executing members of the Greek resistance, in close collaboration with the Nazi Gestapo and SS.

After the liberation of Greece in October 1944, the leaders of the Directorate were given prison sentences, but, because of the outbreak of the Greek Civil War a few years later, most of them had been released by the early 1950s, as they were seen as natural allies of the government in the fight against communism. The most notorious example was Colonel Anastassios Pateris, who not only managed to escape punishment, but eventually became a general and went on to serve as Chief of the Hellenic Gendarmerie in 1954–1957.
