= EAM =

EAM may refer to:

- East Art Map, an art history project
- Electric accounting machine
- Electro-absorption modulator
- Embedded atom model
- Emergency Action Message
- Enterprise architecture management
- Enterprise asset management
- European Academy of Microbiology
- Equine atypical myopathy
- External Affairs Minister
- External auditory meatus
- Henry Eam (died before 1360), Founder Knight of the Order of the Garter
- Najran Domestic Airport, in Saudi Arabia
- EAM-ELAS, the largest Greek World War II Resistance movement
