= Anthony Delon =

French actor

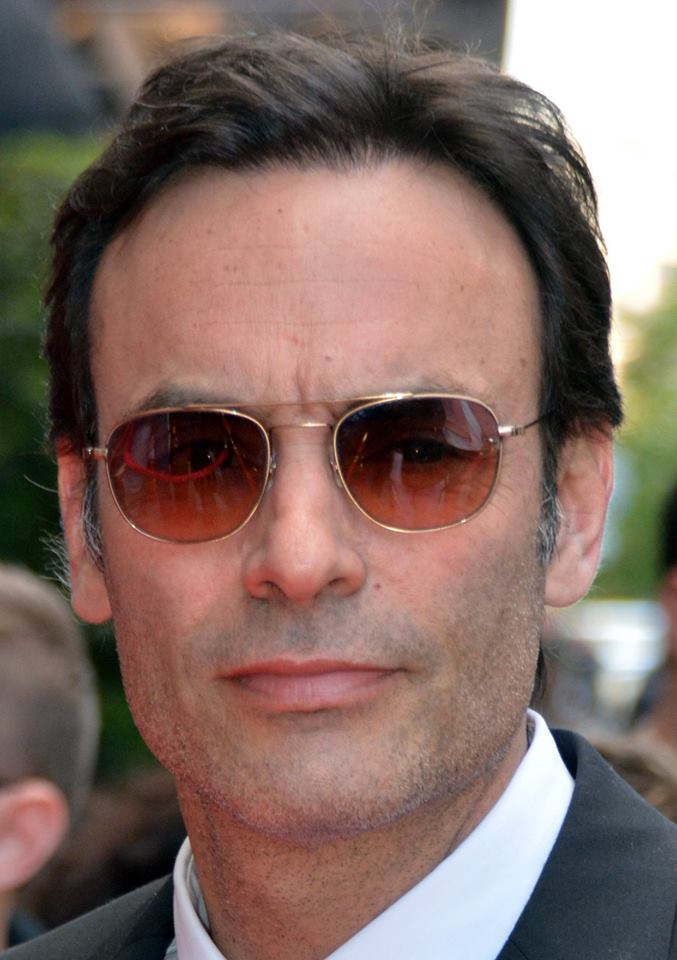
- Delon in 2018
- Born: Georges Alain Anthony Delon; September 30, 1964 (age 62); Los Angeles, California, US
- Citizenship: France, United States
- Occupation: Actor
- Years active: 1986–present
- Spouse: Sophie Clerico (m. 2006; sep. 2012)
- Partner: Sveva Alviti (2019–2023)
- Children: 3
- Parents: Alain Delon; Nathalie Delon
- Relatives: Christian Aaron Boulogne (half-brother); Anouchka Delon (half-sister); Alain-Fabien Delon (half-brother)

Georges Alain Anthony Delon (French: [ɑ̃tɔni dəlɔ̃]; born September 30, 1964) is an American-born French actor, and son of actors Alain Delon and Nathalie Delon.

== Biography ==
Delon was born in Los Angeles but grew up in France. He is the son of actors Alain Delon and Nathalie Delon. He had an older half brother Christian Aaron Boulogne and has a younger half brother Alain-Fabien Delon. He has an older half sister, Nathalie Barthelemy, and a younger half sister Anouchka Delon. His paternal grandfather François Fabien Delon was the director of the cinema Le Régina in Bourg-la-Reine while his paternal grandmother Édith Arnold was an employee in a pharmacy. His maternal grandfather Louis Canovas was the manager of a transport company in Morocco while maternal grandmother was Antoinette Rodriguez. Delon stated that he had only met his paternal grandfather once when he was two years old and he also said that he met his maternal grandfather before his death. Delon is the former boyfriend of Princess Stéphanie of Monaco.

He married Sophie Clerico on June 27, 2006. They separated in 2012. They have two daughters, born in 1996 and 2001. Anthony has one daughter, born 1986, with Marie-Hélène Le Borges, a former dancer at the Crazy Horse in Paris.

== Selected filmography ==
- A Thorn in the Heart (1986)
- Chronicle of a Death Foretold (1987)
- Desert of Fire (1997)
- La Vérité si je mens ! (1997)
- Frenchman's Creek (1998)
- Amour de Femme (2001)
- Paris Connections (2010)
- Polisse (2011)
