= Etienne Faure =

Etienne Faure (born 1969) is a French producer, director and screenwriter, mostly known for his art house movies.

== Works ==
- 1985: Y’a pas le feu by Richard Balducci, assistant director
- 1988: À la recherche de Tadzio, Short film documentary and interview with Björn Andrésen, Director, screenwriter, producer
- 1991: Les Paroles invisibles, Short film, fiction, Director, screenwriter
- 1992: Tous les garçons, Short film, fiction, Director, screenwriter
- 1997: La Fin de la nuit, Short film, fiction, Director, screenwriter
- 2000: In extremis, Feature film, fiction, Director, screenwriter, producer
- 2004: Quoi ? L'éternité, documentary to celebrate the 150th anniversary of the birth of Rimbaud, Director, screenwriter, cinematographer, producer
- 2004: Prisoner, Short film, fiction, Director, screenwriter, producer
- 2009: Des illusions, Feature film, fiction, Director, screenwriter, producer
- 2012: Désordres, Feature film, psychological thriller, Director, screenwriter, producer
- 2014: Bizarre, Feature film, Director, screenwriter, producer
- 2020: Un monde ailleurs, thriller film, drama, Director, screenwriter
