= Nathalie Delon =

French actress and film director (1941–2021)

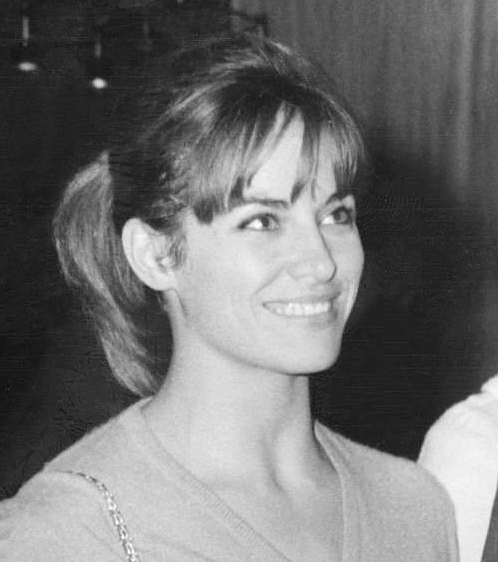
- Delon in 1965
- Born: Francine Canovas; 1 August 1941; Oujda, French Protectorate in Morocco
- Died: 21 January 2021 (aged 79); Paris, France
- Occupations: Actress; model; film director; writer
- Years active: 1965–2010
- Known for: Le Samouraï; La leçon particulière; The Monk; Bluebeard; A Whisper in the Dark
- Height: 1.65 m (5 ft 5 in)
- Spouses: Guy Barthélémy (m. 1957; div. 1964) Alain Delon (m. 1964; div. 1969)
- Partner: Chris Blackwell (1978–1993)
- Children: 2, including: Anthony Delon
- Website: www.nathaliedelon.com

Nathalie Delon, born Francine Canovas, also known as Nathalie Barthélémy (French: [natali dəlɔ̃]; 1 August 1941 – 21 January 2021), was a French actress, model, film director and writer. In the 1960s, she was regarded as one of the most beautiful women in the world and in the 1970s, she was considered a French sex symbol. She is well known for her first acting role, appearing opposite her husband, actor Alain Delon, in the neo-noir film Le Samouraï directed by Jean-Pierre Melville (1967). She appeared in 30 films and directed two others.

== Early life ==
Francine Canovas was born on 1 August 1941 in Oujda, then under the French Protectorate in Morocco, to a French family of Spanish origin. She was the daughter of Louis Canovas (1915–2003), pied-noir of Oran (Algeria), manager of a transport company in Morocco, who abandoned the family when she was 8 months old in 1942 and Antoinette Rodriguez, who was from Melilla. Nathalie had a sister, Louisette, and a brother.

== Personal life ==
In 1957, Nathalie married a conscript from the north of France, Guy Barthélémy, who later became the signing officer for Omnium Marocain d'Assurance. They lived in Morocco and had a daughter named Nathalie Barthélémy. The marriage ended in 1960 and the following year she moved to Paris. Their divorce was granted in July 1964.

In August 1962, she met French actor Alain Delon at New Jimmy's, a Paris nightclub, and they began a secret relationship that night that lasted one year. In May 1963, she accompanied Delon to the shoot of his new film La Tulipe Noire. The couple became engaged in April 1964 and on 13 August 1964, they married in Loir-et-Cher. Their son, Anthony Delon, was born on 30 September 1964, at Cedars-Sinai Medical Center in Los Angeles. They were one of the most glamorous and talked-about couples of the 1960s. Nathalie and Alain Delon separated in June 1968, and were divorced on 14 February 1969. They worked together on two films: Le Samouraï, whilst they were married, and Doucement les Basses after their divorce.

During the 1960s and 1970s she dated Mick Jagger, Keith Richards, Bobby Keys, Marc Porel, Eddie Fisher, Renaud Verley, Louis Malle, and Franco Nero, among others. Her greatest love was Chris Blackwell, whom she was with for 15 years (1978–1993).

== Career ==
During the 1960s, Nathalie Delon was a model. She was photographed by top French and foreign photographers for famous magazines such as Vogue.

In 1967, she became a film actress, starring opposite her husband in the film Le Samouraï by Jean-Pierre Melville, which became a hit. Writing of the Delons' performances in Le Figaro, Bertrand Guyard notes husband and wife are both nearly silent but "their gazes, fraught with meaning, are enough to thrill the camera" with the director drawing from their portrayals "a mythical couple in the seventh art."

Afterwards, she continued her acting career until the 1980s. In 1968 she appeared in The Private Lesson, which made her a star in Japan, ranking her in the top 10 of foreign actresses. In 1971, she appeared in When Eight Bells Toll with Anthony Hopkins and in 1972 she appeared in The Monk with Franco Nero. In 1973, she acted in Le Sex Shop, and her role was one of the film's "moments of real pleasure, as one of its "really marvelous girls", commented Roger Greenspun in The New York Times.

In addition to acting in 30 films during her career, she directed two: one was the story—also written by Delon—of a mother whose son dies in surgery, Ils appellent ça un accident (transl. They Call It an Accident) in 1982, and the other was Sweet Lies in 1988.

== Later life ==
In 2006, Delon published a memoir, Pleure pas, c'est pas grave (Don't cry, it isn't serious). Le Figaro described it as an account of "her darker period, her marriage to [Alain] Delon, her descent into hell with drugs. But still full of life, she also recounts the exceptional encounters she has had with people who made her laugh and who make us laugh too. Delightful and entertaining anecdotes".

Nathalie Delon died at the age of 79 in Paris on 21 January 2021 from pancreatic cancer.

== Filmography ==
Year	Title	Role	Director	Notes	Ref.
1967	Le Samouraï	Jane Lagrange	Jean-Pierre Melville	With Alain Delon	
1968	The Private Lesson	Frederique Dampierre	Michel Boisrond		
1969	Le sorelle (The Sisters)	Diana	Roberto Malenotti		
1969	La Main	Sylvie	Henri Glaeser		
1969	Army of Shadows	a friend of Jean-François	Jean-Pierre Melville	Uncredited	
1971	Doucement les basses (Easy Down There!)	Rita	Jacques Deray	With Alain Delon	
1971	When Eight Bells Toll	Charlotte Skouras	Étienne Périer	With Anthony Hopkins	
1972	Bluebeard	Erika	Edward Dmytryk	With Richard Burton	
1972	Le Sex Shop	Jacqueline	Claude Berri		
1972	Repeated Absences	Sophie	Guy Gilles		
1972	The Monk	Mathilde	Adonis A. Kyrou	With Franco Nero	
1973	L'Histoire très bonne et très joyeuse de Colinot trousse-chemise	Bertrade	Nina Companeez		
1973	Profession: Aventuriers	Marie Chapuis	Claude Mulot		
1974	Vous intéressez-vous à la chose ?	Lise	Jacques Baratier		
1974	Hold-Up – Atraco en la Costa Azul	Judy	Germán Lorente		
1975	The Romantic Englishwoman	Miranda	Joseph Losey		
1975	Docteur Justice	Karine	Christian-Jaque		
1976	Une femme fidèle	Flora de Saint-Gilles	Roger Vadim		
1976	Un sussurro nel buio (A Whisper in the Dark)	Camilla	Marcello Aliprandi		
1977	Fire in the Water	as herself	Peter Whitehead	With Peter Whitehead	
1977	L'avventurosa fuga: Gli ultimi angeli	Elisabetta	Enzo Doria		
1978	The Man in the Rushes	Loraine	Manfred Purzer		
1978	Seagulls Fly Low	Isabelle Michereau	Giorgio Cristallini		
1978	Occhi dalle stelle (Eyes Behind the Stars)	Monica Stiles	Mario Gariazzo		
1979	Le Temps des Vacances	Martine	Claude Vital		
1980	La Bande du Rex	Janine	Jean-Henri Meunier		
1982	Ils appellent ça un accident	Julie Fabre	Nathalie Delon	Also director and writer	
1983	Pair-impairment		Carole Marquand	Short film	
1988	Sweet Lies	—N/a	Nathalie Delon	Director only	
2008	Nuit de chien	Risso	Werner Schroeter		
2009	Mensch	Liliane Hazak	Steve Suissa		

== Television ==
Television credits of Nathalie Delon
Year	Title	Role	Director	Notes	Ref.
1965	Dim Dam Dom	Herself		TV series documentary	
1967	Dim Dam Dom	Herself		TV series documentary	
1968	Dim Dam Dom	Herself		TV series documentary	
1978	Madame le juge	Françoise Muller	Raymond Thévenet	Miniseries (6 episodes)	
1979	Euphorie II	Danielle Saura	Philippe Ducrest	Television film	
1979	Efficax	Hélène Chapel	Philippe Ducrest	Television film	
1978-81	Histoires de voyous	Irène	Pierre Goutas	TV series (9 episodes)	

== Publications ==
=== Novel ===
- Au plus fort de l'orage : roman (in French). Paris: R. Laffont. 1994. ISBN 978-2221075630.

=== Memoir ===
- Pleure pas, c'est pas grave : souvenirs (in French). Groupe Flammarion. 2006. ISBN 978-2-08-123399-7. OCLC 937870010.
