= List of French films of 1972 =

A list of films produced in France in 1972.

== Films ==
| Title | Director | Cast | Genre | Notes |
|---|---|---|---|---|
| Alfredo, Alfredo | Pietro Germi | Dustin Hoffman, Stefania Sandrelli, Carla Gravina | Comedy | Italian-French co-production |
| And Hope to Die | René Clément | Jean-Louis Trintignant, Robert Ryan, Lea Massari | Crime | French-Italian co-production |
| The Assassination | Yves Boisset | Michel Piccoli, Jean-Louis Trintignant, Jean Seberg | Thriller | French-Italian-West German production |
| L'aventure, c'est l'aventure | Claude Lelouch | Lino Ventura, Jacques Brel, Charles Denner | Comedy | French-Italian co-production |
| The Bar at the Crossing | Alain Levent | Jacques Brel, Rosy Varte, Isabelle Huppert | Adventure | |
| The Beguines | Guy Casaril | Anicée Alvina, Nicole Courcel | Drama | French-Italian co-production |
| Black Turin | Carlo Lizzani | Bud Spencer, Françoise Fabian, Marcel Bozzuffi | | Italian-French co-production |
| The Canterbury Tales | Pier Paolo Pasolini | Adrian Street, Alan Webb, Albert King | Comedy | Italian-French co-production |
| César and Rosalie | Claude Sautet | Romy Schneider, Yves Montand, Sami Frey | Comedy-drama | French-Italian-West German co-production |
| Daughter of Dracula | Jesús Franco | Anne Libert, Britt Nichols, Jesus Franco | Horror | French-Portuguese co-production |
| Dear Louise | Philippe de Broca | Jeanne Moreau, Didi Perego, Julien Negulesco | Drama, romance | French-Italian co-production |
| The Discreet Charm of the Bourgeoisie | Luis Buñuel | Fernando Rey, Delphine Seyrig, Stéphane Audran | Avant-garde | French-Italian-Spanish co-production |
| Dr. Popaul | Claude Chabrol | Jean-Paul Belmondo, Mia Farrow, Laura Antonelli | Comedy | French-Italian co-production |
| Dracula, Prisoner of Frankenstein | Jesús Franco | Dennis Price, Howard Vernon, Alberto Dalbés | | Spanish-Portuguese-French-Liechtensteiner co-production |
| Eglantine | Jean-Claude Brialy | Valentine Tessier, Claude Dauphin, Odile Versois, Micheline Luccioni | Comedy, Drama | |
| The Erotic Adventures of Zorro | Robert Freeman | David F. Friedman, John Alderman, Jude Farese | Adult, adventure | |
| The Eroticist | Lucio Fulci | Agostina Belli, Arturo Dominici, Corrado Gaipa | | Italian-French co-production |
| Escape to the Sun | Menahem Golan | Laurence Harvey, Jack Hawkins | Drama, thriller | Israeli-French-West German co-production |
| Un flic | Jean-Pierre Melville | Alain Delon, Catherine Deneuve, Richard Crenna | Crime | |
| Gang War in Naples | Pasquale Squitieri | Fabio Testi, Raymond Pellegrin, Jean Seberg | | Italian-French co-production |
| The Gates of Fire | Claude Bernard-Aubert | Emmanuelle Riva, Dany Carrel, Annie Cordy | War drama | |
| A Gorgeous Girl Like Me | François Truffaut | Bernadette Lafont, Charles Denner, Claude Brasseur | Comedy, crime | |
| Hearth Fires | Serge Korber | Annie Girardot, Claude Jade, Jean Rochefort, Bernard Fresson | Drama, romance | French-Italian co-production |
| The Hell Below | Robert Enrico | Serge Reggiani, Juliet Berto, Jean Bouise | | |
| I Am Frigid... Why? | Max Pécas | Sandra Julien, Marie-Georges Pascal, Jean-Luc Terrade | Drama, softcore sex film | |
| Indian Summer | Valerio Zurlini | Alain Delon, Sonia Petrovna, Lea Massari | | Italian-French co-production |
| Justine de Sade | Claude Pierson | Alice Arno, Mauro Parenti, Yves Arcanel | Adult, crime, drama | |
| Lady Liberty | Mario Monicelli | Sophia Loren, William Devane, Gigi Proietti | Comedy | Italian-French co-production |
| Last Tango in Paris | Bernardo Bertolucci | Marlon Brando, Maria Schneider, Maria Michi | Drama | Italian-French co-production |
| Love in the Afternoon | Éric Rohmer | Bernard Verley, Zouzou, Francoise Verley | Drama | |
| Les malheurs d'Alfred | Pierre Richard | Pierre Richard, Anny Duperey, Pierre Mondy | Comedy | |
| Menace | Sergio Gobbi | Charles Aznavour, Marie-Christine Barrault, Raymond Pellegrin | | |
| Not Dumb, The Bird | Jean Delannoy | Françoise Rosay, Anny Duperey, Bruno Pradal | Comedy crime | Co-production with Italy and West Germany |
| The Old Maid | Jean-Pierre Blanc | Annie Girardot, Philippe Noiret, Michel Lonsdale | Comedy, romance | |
| The Outside Man | Jacques Deray | Jean-Louis Trintignant, Ann-Margret, Roy Scheider | | French-Italian-American co-production |
| Pas folle la guêpe | Jean Delannoy | Françoise Rosay, Anny Duperey, Bruno Pradal, Philippe Clay, Olivier Hussenot, Daniel Ceccaldi | Comedy, Drama | French-Italian-West German co-production |
| A Reason to Live, a Reason to Die | Tonino Valerii | James Coburn, Bud Spencer, Telly Savalas | Western | Italian-Spanish-French-West German co-production |
| Repeated Absences | Guy Gilles | Patrick Penn, Patrick Jouane, Nathalie Delon | Drama | |
| Requiem for a Vampire | Jean Rollin | Marie-Pierre Castel, Paul Bisciglia, Michel Delesalle | | |
| Roma | Federico Fellini | Peter Gonzales, Fiona Florence, Pia De Doses | Comedy-drama | Italian-French co-production |
| La Scoumoune | José Giovanni | Jean-Paul Belmondo, Claudia Cardinale, Michel Constantin | Crime | French-Italian co-production |
| Shadows Unseen | Camillo Bazzoni | Frederick Stafford, Marilù Tolo, Franco Fabrizi | | Italian-French-West German co-production |
| State of Siege | Costa-Gavras | Yves Montand | | French-Italian-West German co-production |
| The Summertime Killer | Antonio Isasi-Isasmendi | Olivia Hussey, Karl Malden, Christopher Mitchum | | Spanish-French-Italian co-production |
| Sweet Deception | Édouard Molinaro | Annie Girardot, Philippe Noiret, Madeleine Renaud | Comedy | Co-production with Italy |
| The Tall Blond Man with One Black Shoe | Yves Robert | Pierre Richard, Mireille Darc, Bernard Blier, Jean Rochefort | Comedy | |
| Tintin and the Lake of Sharks | Raymond LeBlanc | | Animated film, adventure, children's | French-Belgium co-production |
| Tout Va Bien | Jean-Luc Godard, Jean-Pierre Gorin | Jane Fonda, Yves Montand, Vittorio Caprioli | Drama | French-Italian co-production |
| Le Tueur | Denys de La Patellière | Jean Gabin, Fabio Testi, Uschi Glas | Crime | French-Italian-West German co-production |
| The Valachi Papers | Terence Young | Charles Bronson, Lino Ventura, Jill Ireland | Crime | Italian-French co-production |
| La Vallée | Barbet Schroeder | Bulle Ogier, Michael Gothard, Jean-Pierre Kalfon | Adventure, drama | |
| Le Viager | Pierre Tchernia | Michel Serrault, Michel Galabru, Claude Brasseur | Comedy | |
| We Won't Grow Old Together | Maurice Pialat | Marlène Jobert, Jean Yanne | Drama | |
| What? | Roman Polanski | Sydne Rome, Marcello Mastroianni | Comedy | Italian-French-West German co-production |

== See also ==
- 1972 in France
