= Michel Aumont =

French actor (1936–2019)

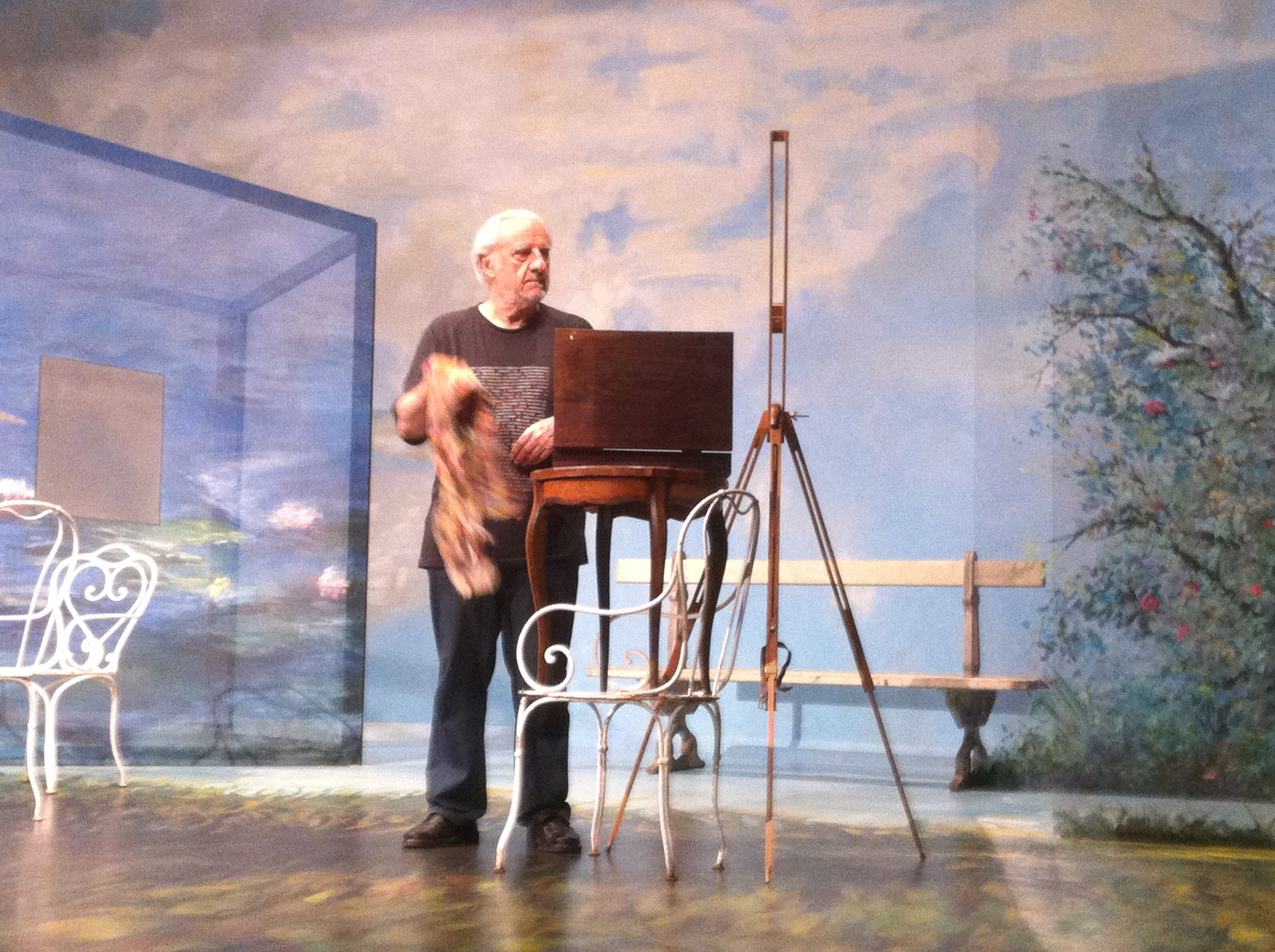
- Michel Aumont in 2014.
- Born: Michel Henri Aumont; 15 October 1936; Paris, France
- Died: 28 August 2019 (aged 82); Paris, France
- Education: CNSAD
- Occupation: Actor
- Years active: 1952–2018
- Spouse: Nadège
- Children: 1

Michel Henri Aumont (15 October 1936 – 28 August 2019) was a French theatre, film, and television actor. Throughout his career, he gained four Molière Awards and nominations for three César Awards. In 2015, he was made Grand Officer of the National Order of Merit.

== Biography ==
Born October 15, 1936, in Paris. He studied at the Paris Conservatory of Dramatic Art.

From the 1970s, he became one of the leading comedic actors in French cinema, despite having played mostly supporting roles.

He worked on the Comédie-Française stage for thirty years.

== Filmography ==
Film
Year	Title	Role	Director	Notes
1966	Le légataire universel	Géronte	Jean Pignol	TV movie
1967	Huckleberry Finn		Marcel Cravenne	TV movie
1968	Au théâtre ce soir	The Commissioner	Pierre Sabbagh	TV series (1 episode)
1970	Monsieur de Pourceaugnac	The Doctor	Georges Lacombe	TV movie
1972	Pot-Bouille	Auguste	Yves-André Hubert	TV mini-series
1972	Frédéric II	Frederick William II of Prussia	Olivier Ricard	TV movie
1972	Électre	The President	Pierre Dux	TV movie
1972	Les femmes savantes	Vadius	Jean Vernier	TV movie
1973	Georges Dandin	Colin	Jean Dewever	TV movie
1973	La femme en bleu	Edmond	Michel Deville	
1973	Un ange au paradis	Mouton	Jean-Pierre Blanc	
1973	Molière pour rire et pour pleurer	Du Croisy	Marcel Camus	TV mini-series
1973	Antigone	The Guard	Jean-Paul Carrère	TV movie
1974	L'avare	Harpagon	René Lucot	TV movie
1974	Nada	Goemond	Claude Chabrol	
1974	Grandeur nature	Henry	Luis García Berlanga	
1974	La gifle	Charvin	Claude Pinoteau	
1975	Le futur aux trousses	Ernest	Dolorès Grassian	
1975	La course à l'échalote	Commissioner Brunet	Claude Zidi	
1975	Speak to Me of Love	Daniel's father	Michel Drach	
1975	Monsieur Balboss	The Minister	Jean Marboeuf	
1975	La maison des renards	The Commissioner	Michel Hermant	TV movie
1975	Le médecin malgré lui	Géronte	Lazare Iglesis	TV movie
1976	Scrambled Eggs	The Chief of Staff	Joël Santoni	
1976	Little Marcel	Taron	Jacques Fansten	
1976	Monsieur Klein	The official of the Prefecture	Joseph Losey	
1976	Mado	Aimé Barachet	Claude Sautet	
1976	La commère	Mlle Habert's nephew	Nat Lilienstein	TV movie
1976	The Toy	The shop's owner	Francis Veber	
1977	Partage de midi	Amalric	Jacques Audoir	TV movie
1977	Spoiled Children	Pierre	Bertrand Tavernier	Nominated - César Award for Best Supporting Actor
1977	Death of a Corrupt Man	Commissioner Moreau	Georges Lautner	
1977	Pourquoi pas!	Inspector Bricat	Coline Serreau	
1978	L'exercice du pouvoir	Alexandre Bast	Philippe Galland	
1978	Dossier 51	Mars's voice	Michel Deville (2)	
1978	Le roi se meurt	King Bérenger I	Yves-André Hubert (2)	TV movie
1978	Le petit théâtre d'Antenne 2		François Chatel	TV series (1 episode)
1979	La frisée aux lardons	Pierre	Alain Jaspard	
1979	Coup de tête	Bertrand Brochard	Jean-Jacques Annaud	
1979	Bête, mais discipliné	Mike Stévenin	Claude Zidi (2)	
1979	Le triomphe de l'amour	Hermocrate	Edouard Logereau	TV movie
1979	Courage - Let's Run	Franckie	Yves Robert	Nominated - César Award for Best Supporting Actor
1979	Les dames de la côte	Louis	Nina Companeez	TV mini-series
1980	L'oeil du maître	Ferrazi	Stéphane Kurc	
1981	Le roi des cons	The CEO	Claude Confortès	
1981	Celles qu'on n'a pas eues	Francis	Pascal Thomas	
1981	Les plaisirs de l'île enchantée	Orgon	Dirk Sanders	TV movie
1981	Le serment d'Heidelberg	Amédée Geoffroy	André Farwagi	TV movie
1981	La vie continue	Henri	Moshé Mizrahi	
1981	Antoine et Julie	Dagobert	Gabriel Axel	TV movie
1982	Mille milliards de dollars		Henri Verneuil	
1982	Légitime violence	Henri Brousse	Serge Leroy	
1982	Le voyage de Monsieur Perrichon	Majorin	Pierre Badel	TV movie
1982	Mozart	Colloredo	Marcel Bluwal	TV mini-series
1983	Édith et Marcel	Newscast voice	Claude Lelouch	
1983	Le grain de sable	Maurice Leger	Pomme Meffre	
1983	Thérèse Humbert	Salignac	Marcel Bluwal (2)	TV movie
1983	Les Compères	Paul Martin	Francis Veber (2)	
1983	Pourrira		Jean-Louis Berdot	Short
1983	Ballade sanglante		Sylvain Madigan	Short
1984	A Sunday in the Country	Gonzague	Bertrand Tavernier (2)	Nominated - César Award for Best Supporting Actor
1984	Dangerous Moves	Stepan Ivanovitch Kerossian	Richard Dembo	
1984	Lucienne et le boucher	Moreau	Pierre Tchernia	TV movie
1984	Liste noire	The judge	Alain Bonnot	
1985	Monsieur de Pourceaugnac	The first doctor	Michel Mitrani	
1985	Escalier C	Joss	Jean-Charles Tacchella	
1985	L'histoire en marche: Le serment	Rondelet	Roger Kahane	TV movie
1985	Le mariage du siècle	The King	Philippe Galland (2)	
1985	Une Femme ou Deux	Pierre Carrière	Daniel Vigne	
1985	Morphée		Bruno Chiche	Short
1986	L'été 36	Henri	Yves Robert (2)	TV movie
1986	L'ami Maupassant	The Bishop	Claude Santelli	TV series (1 episode)
1986	Prunelle Blues	Commissioner Cade	Jacques Otmezguine	
1986	Cours privé	Bruno Ketti	Pierre Granier-Deferre	
1987	Sale destin	Inspector Marchandon	Sylvain Madigan (2)	
1987	Killing Time	Florimont	Édouard Niermans	
1987	Série noire	Homère	Maurice Dugowson	TV series (1 episode)
1987	Les Michaud	Saucie	Georges Folgoas	TV movie
1988	Les années sandwiches	Uncle Jean	Pierre Boutron	
1988	La septième dimension		Benoît Ferreux	
1989	L'or du diable	Bourdet	Jean-Louis Fournier	TV mini-series
1989	Un tour de manège	Bank's owner	Pierre Pradinas	
1989	Les nuits révolutionnaires	M. de Glancé	Charles Brabant	TV mini-series
1989	Fantômes sur l'oreiller	Bernard Labarges	Pierre Mondy	TV movie
1990	My New Partner II	Bloret	Claude Zidi (3)	
1990	Alberto Express	The debtor	Arthur Joffé	
1991	Le piège	Basson	Serge Moati	TV movie
1991	Sushi Sushi	Bertrand Casier	Laurent Perrin	
1992	La révolte des enfants	The Uncle	Gérard Poitou-Weber	
1992	Archipel	Rantaine	Pierre Granier-Deferre (2)	
1992	Sexes faibles!	Montheau	Serge Meynard	
1993	Le bal	M. Duchatel	Jean-Louis Benoît	TV movie
1993	Shadow of a Doubt	Grandfather	Aline Issermann	
1993	Un otage de trop	Chaumont Pierrard	Philippe Galland (3)	TV movie
1995	Le roi de Paris	The Marquis de Castellac	Dominique Maillet	
1995	Le parasite	Lucien Laroque	Patrick Dewolf	TV movie
1995	Au petit Marguery	Hippolyte	Laurent Bénégui	
1996	Beaumarchais	Baron de Breteuil	Édouard Molinaro	
1997	La famille Sapajou	Pépé Sapajou	Élisabeth Rappeneau	TV movie
1997	La Ville dont le prince est un enfant	The Father Superior	Christophe Malavoy	TV movie
1997	Tortilla y cinema	Himself	Martin Provost	
1997	Le bonheur est un mensonge	Charles Fontaine	Patrick Dewolf (2)	TV movie
1997	Mauvais genre	Bernard Brondin	Laurent Bénégui (2)	
1997	Messieurs les enfants	The principal	Pierre Boutron (2)	
1997	Parfum de famille	Louis	Serge Moati (2)	TV movie
1997	Le secret de Bastien		Serge Moati (3)	TV movie
1998	Man Is a Woman	Uncle Salomon	Jean-Jacques Zilbermann	
1998	Une chance sur deux	Ledoyen	Patrice Leconte	
1998	Une femme à suivre	M. Ponty	Patrick Dewolf (3)	TV movie
1998	La famille Sapajou - le retour	Pépé Sapajou	Élisabeth Rappeneau (2)	TV movie
1998	La cloche		Charles Berling	Short
1999	Les migrations de Vladimir	President Colombani	Milka Assaf	
1999	The Count of Monte Cristo	Baron Danglars	Josée Dayan	TV mini-series
1999	Sapajou contre Sapajou	Pépé Sapajou	Élisabeth Rappeneau (3)	TV movie
2000	Le pique-nique de Lulu Kreutz	Michel Mazelsky	Didier Martiny	
2000	Salsa	Monsieur Redele	Joyce Buñuel	
2000	Les enfants du printemps	Marc	Marco Pico	TV mini-series
2001	The Closet	Jean-Pierre Belone	Francis Veber (3)	
2001	Rastignac ou les ambitieux	Monsieur de Rastignac	Alain Tasma	TV mini-series
2001	Le mal de mère		Édouard Molinaro (2)	
2002	Moulin à paroles		Pascal Rémy	Short
2002	La grande brasserie	Jean-Marc Constant	Dominique Baron	TV movie
2003	Nés de la mère du monde	Isaac Sidowski	Denise Chalem	TV movie
2003	Mata Hari, la vraie histoire	Captain Ladoux	Alain Tasma (2)	TV movie
2003	Qui perd gagne!	RG's director	Laurent Bénégui (3)	
2003	Le intermittenze del cuore	Baumann	Fabio Carpi	
2003	Ruby & Quentin	Nosberg	Francis Veber (4)	
2004	Clara et moi	Antoine's father	Arnaud Viard	
2004	Automne	Noël	Ra'up McGee	
2004	La nuit du meurtre	Louis Castellane	Serge Meynard (2)	TV movie
2005	Une vie en retour	Maxime Duval	Daniel Janneau	TV movie
2005	La visite	Alexandre Monjoit	Pierre Sisser	TV movie
2005	Les enquêtes d'Éloïse Rome	René Wilhem	Christophe Douchand	TV series (1 episode)
2005	Palais royal!	René-Guy	Valérie Lemercier	
2006	Le juge est une femme	Émile Tarpon	Joyce Buñuel (2)	TV series (1 episode)
2006	The Valet	The Doctor	Francis Veber (5)	
2006	Mes parents chéris	M. Amato	Philomène Esposito	TV movie
2006	L'enfant du secret	Abbé de l'Épée	Serge Meynard (3)	TV movie
2007	René Bousquet ou Le grand arrangement	Judge Moatty	Laurent Heynemann	TV movie
2007	Enfin seul(s)	Antoine	Bruno Herbulot	TV movie
2008	À droite toute		Marcel Bluwal (3)	TV mini-series
2008	Mark of an Angel	Alain Valentin	Safy Nebbou	
2008	Miroir, mon beau miroir	Paul	Serge Meynard (4)	TV movie
2008	Braquage en famille	Marcel Jacquin	Pierre Boutron (3)	TV movie
2008	L'emmerdeur	François Randoni	Francis Veber (6)	
2009	La reine morte	King Ferrante	Pierre Boutron (4)	TV movie
2009	Park Benches	Backgammon's player	Bruno Podalydès	
2009	Suite noire	Demare	Claire Devers	TV series (1 episode)
2009	La sainte Victoire	Robert Richerand	François Favrat	
2010	My Father's Guests	Lucien Paumelle	Anne Le Ny	
2010	Le grand restaurant	A client	Gérard Pullicino	TV movie
2010	Toutes les filles pleurent	The man in the bar	Judith Godrèche	
2010	Comme les cinq doigts de la main	Maurice Atlan	Alexandre Arcady	
2010	La très excellente et divertissante histoire de François Rabelais	François Rabelais	Hervé Baslé	TV movie
2010	Imogène McCarthery	Sir Woolish	Alexandre Charlot; Franck Magnier	
2010	Un balcon sur la mer	Robert Prat	Nicole Garcia	
2011	Simple	Villedieu	Ivan Calbérac	TV movie
2011	Je m'appelle Bernadette	Dominique Peyramale	Jean Sagols	
2012	Petits arrangements avec ma mère	André	Denis Malleval	TV movie
2012	La clinique de l'amour!	David Marchal	Artus de Penguern; Gábor Rassov	
2012	Divorce et fiançailles	Georges	Olivier Péray	TV movie
2012	Paris Manhattan	Alice's Father	Sophie Lellouche	
2013	Les vieux calibres	Irénée Lecoutre	Marcel Bluwal (4); Serge De Closets	TV movie
2013	Chambre noire	M. Edouard	Arnaud Malherbe	TV movie
2014	On a marché sur Bangkok	Poséidon	Olivier Baroux	
2016	News from Planet Mars	The father	Dominik Moll	

== Awards ==
- Molière Award for Best Supporting Actor (1999)
