= Valerie Wilson =

Valerie Wilson may refer to:

- Valerie Elise Plame Wilson, usually known as Valerie Plame, CIA operative at the center of a criminal investigation and political scandal
- Valerie Rawlston Wilson, African-American economist
- Valerie Wilson Wesley, African-American author; former executive editor of Essence magazine
- Valerie Wilson, from North Babylon, New York, who twice in the 2000s won a $1 million prize in the New York Lottery
- Valérie Wilson, French actress

See also:
