= Un flic =

1972 film by Jean-Pierre Melville

- Theatrical release poster
- Directed by: Jean-Pierre Melville
- Screenplay by: Jean-Pierre Melville
- Story by: Jean-Pierre Melville
- Produced by: Robert Dorfmann
- Starring: Alain Delon; Richard Crenna; Catherine Deneuve; Riccardo Cucciolla; Michael Conrad; Paul Crauchet; Simone Valère; André Pousse; Jean Desailly
- Cinematography: Walter Wottitz
- Edited by: Patricia Nény
- Music by: Michel Colombier
- Production companies: Les Films Corona; Oceania Produzione Internazionale; Euro International Film
- Release dates: 25 October 1972 (France); 21 December 1972 (Italy)
- Running time: 98 minutes
- Countries: France; Italy
- Language: French
- Budget: 11.25 million francs

Un flic (lit. 'A Cop') is a 1972 crime film directed and written by Jean-Pierre Melville. The film is about a Parisian nightclub owner named Simon who leads four men to carry out on a bank robbery. One is seriously wounded and taken to a clinic. Fearing the police will locate him, Simon sends his mistress Cathy to kill him. Cathy's lover, Commissaire Édouard Coleman learns from an informer that a large quantity of drugs are being transported by the Paris-Lisbon train and intends to intercept it.

The film was the third collaboration between Melville and actor Alain Delon. It was set to be shot in three months starting November 13. On set, Melville and Delon often argued which was not the case on their previous productions.

The film was released in France on October 25, 1972, where it performed less well in the box office than Melville and Delon's previous collaboration with Le Cercle Rouge (1970). It was Melville's last film as he died the next year.

== Plot ==
On a rainy winter day in Saint-Jean-de-Monts, France, Simon and his three accomplices rob a bank. Marc Albouis and Paul Weber come inside with Simon, while Louis Costa, the getaway driver, waits outside. As they are about to leave, the bank teller sets off the alarm and shoots Marc, who shoots and kills the teller. The gang escape with only part of the loot and drive back to Paris, where they place Marc in Clinique Geoffroy Saint-Hilaire, a private clinic, under the alias "Schmidt".

Commissaire Edouard Coleman spends his nights driving around Paris from crime scene to crime scene. He also meets with his informants, such as Gaby, a transgender sex worker who is currently feeding him information about an upcoming drug shipment that involves one of her clients. Edouard goes to the nightclub Simon owns just after it closes for the night and plays the piano while Simon's girlfriend, Cathy, watches. Simon returns from Saint-Jean-de-Monts, and Edouard greets him before getting called away by his partner, Inspector Morand.

As the press reports that one of the assailants was injured during the robbery, Simon, Louis and Paul set out to transfer Marc out of the clinic before the police search the facility. When a nurse refuses to release Marc due to his health status, Simon sends Cathy into his room disguised as a nurse, and she injects air into his IV, causing a fatal embolism. Edouard is assigned to investigate the true identity of "Schmidt", but he does not expect to succeed. He meets Cathy in a hotel room for a tryst, and later deduces that Simon has always known about their affair.

Simon's next venture is to steal a large quantity of heroin being transported out of France by a professional mule, Mathieu "la Valise", on a night train from Paris to Lisbon, with Mathieu's associates delivering the drugs to him in Bordeaux. Tipped off by Gaby, Edouard sets up an operation to catch Mathieu in Bayonne. Meanwhile, Simon descends from a helicopter onto the speeding train, breaks into Mathieu's cabin, neutralises him with chloroform, and is successfully winched up with the drugs.

Furious that the drugs were not recovered, Edouard berates Gaby and slaps her around for supposedly providing him with false information. When Morand presents Edouard with Marc's autopsy, revealing his real name, Edouard instantly connects Marc to Louis, who is a known associate of Simon. He calls Simon, who is not available, and then calls his chief to ask if Marc's name can be kept out of the press, but the chief says it is too late.

Edouard arrests Louis at a restaurant and brings him to the precinct, where Edouard gets the seemingly indomitable Louis to name Simon and Paul. Edouard goes to the nightclub alone and questions Simon, who denies knowing Marc, Paul or Louis. Edouard then reveals that Louis admitted to knowing Simon, before leaving. Simon immediately warns Paul by telephone, but Edouard and some of his men arrive and burst into Paul's apartment before he can flee; Paul ultimately shoots himself in the head.

Simon hides out at the Hôtel Splendid Étoile at the Arc de Triomphe, and calls Cathy to pick him up, but the police trace the call. As Simon emerges from the hotel carrying an attaché case full of heroin, the waiting Edouard draws a gun and tells him not to move. Simon reaches into his overcoat, and Edouard shoots him dead while Cathy watches helplessly from her car. However, when Edouard inspects Simon's body, he finds he had no gun, leading him to believe it was suicide by cop. Edouard and Cathy exchange glances before he and Morand are called away on another case. Their car phone rings, but they do not answer.

== Cast ==
- Alain Delon as Commissaire Édouard Coleman
- Richard Crenna as Simon, Edouard's friend, Cathy's boyfriend, the owner of a nightclub, Simon's, and the leader of a gang
- Catherine Deneuve as Cathy, Simon's girlfriend, who is having an affair with Edouard
- Riccardo Cucciolla as Paul Weber, a former banker who is now part of Simon's gang
- Michael Conrad as Louis Costa, the getaway driver in Simon's gang
- Paul Crauchet as Inspector Morand, Edouard's partner
- Simone Valère as Paul's wife
- André Pousse as Marc Albouis, the primary gunman of Simon's gang
- Jean Desailly as the older homosexual man who was almost robbed by a teenager
- Valérie Wilson as Gaby, a transgender prostitute who tells Edouard about her clients' criminal activities in exchange for being left alone
- Henri Marteau as the police officer who instructs Edouard in rapid-fire shooting
- Catherine Rethi as the nurse at Geoffroy St. Hilaire Clinic who refuses to transfer Marc
- Philippe Gasté as one of Edouard's detectives
- Dominique Zentar as the teenager who tried to rob the older homosexual man
- Léon Minisini as Mathieu "la Valise" ("the Suitcase"), a drug mule
- Roger Fradet as the teller at the branch of Banque Nationale de Paris (BNP) in Saint-Jean-de-Monts
- Jacques Galland as the train conductor
- Jean-Pierre Posier as one of the men who hands over the heroin to Mathieu in Bordeaux
- Jacques Leroy as one of the men who hands over the heroin to Mathieu in Bordeaux
- Michel Fretault as an employee at the branch of BNP in Saint-Jean-de-Monts
- Gene Moyle as the elderly man on the train
- Pierre Vaudier as the manager of the branch of BNP in Saint-Jean-de-Monts

== Production ==
Following Le Samouraï (1967) and Le Cercle Rouge (1970), director Jean-Pierre Melville began plans for a third collaboration with actor Alain Delon. Initially, the director wanted to make an adaptation of Arsène Lupin, but eventually settled on a project titled Nuit sur la cité (lit. 'Night in the City'). By the time production began, the film title became Un flic (lit. 'A Cop'), a title taken from an unproduced script Melville wrote in 1956.

Melville hired Delon's brother Jean-François Delon as his first assistant and began preparing for new production by watching numerous American films. According to the co-production contract signed on November 1971, the film was to be made over a period of three months starting November 13 with a budget of 11.25 million francs. Un flic was a French and Italian co-production between the Nanterre-based Les Film Corona and the two Rome-based companies Oceania Produzione Internazionale and Euro International Film.

Melville tried to cast Robert Ryan as Simon, who started in one of his favourite films: Odds Against Tomorrow (1959), but the actor was busy shooting And Hope to Die (1972), so the director opted to cast Richard Crenna, whose performance he admired in Wait Until Dark (1967). Delon said in an on-set interview that Melville had given a choice between the role of a cop or that of Simon the gangster. He continued that he opted for the role of Édouard Coleman to satisfy those who critiqued him for indulging in bad-boy characters. At this time in his career, Delon had taken off as a producer and Melville and Delon both had high tempers on set according to the films script girl, Florence Moncorgé-Gabin. Melville was accustomed to imposing tasks on his crew, and at one point had Moncorgé-Gabin to pretend to be someone else for a week by donning a red wig. When Delon saw her in the wig continuously, he asked "How long is this bullshit going to last?" Two versions of the film were shot, with one being in English and another being in French, which also frustrated Delon who had trouble delivering some of the English lines. Jean-François Delon said he would have to calm Melville down by giving him Nuts, a type of chocolate bar that the director loved. Delon was also growing his hair for a role in Valerio Zurlini's Indian Summer (1972) which also led to arguments between the director and actor. The role of Cathy was conceived by Melville with Catherine Deneuve. Deneuve agreed if all her scenes could be shot earlier in development as the actress was in early stages of pregnancy.

Melville initially planned to shoot the stunts on set and use the day-for-night technique. These scenes were later shot within a studio. For some sequences, he used scale models and toys across a giant area with ten meters in diameter. According to Moncorgé-Gabin, Melville was convinced he "was doing something extraordinary." with these scenes. Delon summarized his thoughts on the production and these sequences saying Melville and him argued as the director "could be terribly stubborn" and that he told the director the shots with the train did not work as they were blatantly models and that "[Melville] would have none of it, and he admitted it when it was too late."

== Release ==
Un flic was released in France on October 25, 1972. The film had 1,464,806 entries in France, which were significantly lower than the previous Delon-Melville collaboration, Le Cercle Rouge. The film was Melville's last as he died on August 2, 1973.

The film was released in Italy as Notte sulla città on December 21, 1972 and in Miami, Florida on September 26, 1975. In the United States and United Kingdom, it was released under the title Dirty Money. The Dirty Money version had the French actors' voices replaced just as the American actors were on its release in France.

== Reception ==
Except for a handful of positive reviews in newspapers such as L'Aurore, L'Express and L'Humanité, the authors of French Thrillers of the 1970s: Volume I, Crime Films said that Un flic was poorly received by French critics.

== See also ==
- List of Alain Delon performances
- List of French films of 1972
