= La Ville dont le prince est un enfant =

La Ville dont le prince est un enfant may refer to:

- La Ville dont le prince est un enfant (play), a French play by Henry de Montherlant
- La Ville dont le prince est un enfant (film), a 1997 French television film adapted from the play
- The Fire that Consumes, a 1977 English language adaptation of the original French play
