= Catherine Samie =

French actress (1933–2026)

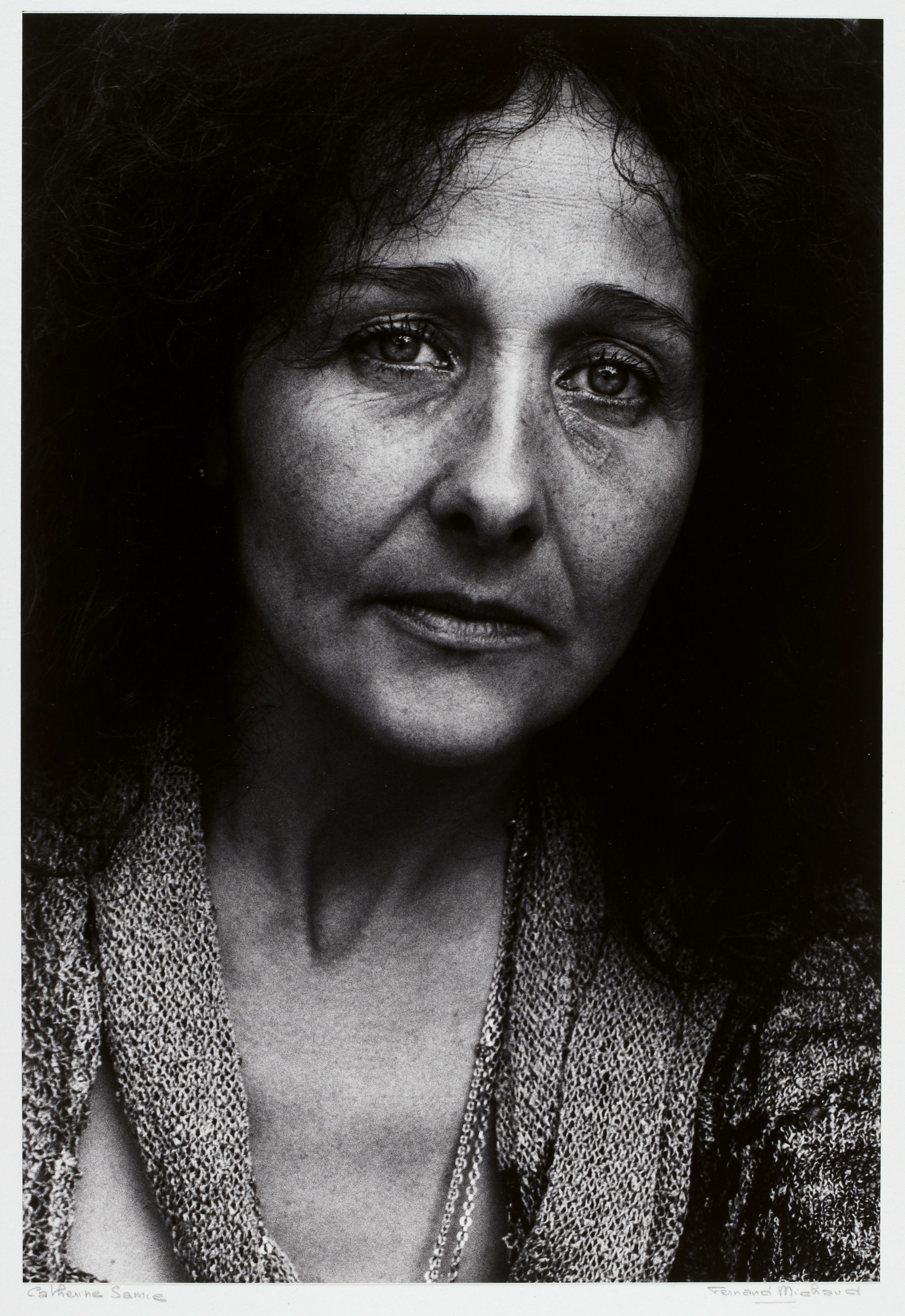
- Samie in 1981
- Born: Catherine Marie Celine Paule Samie; 3 February 1933; Paris, France
- Died: 12 January 2026 (aged 92); Paris, France
- Education: National Academy of Dramatic Arts
- Occupation: Actress
- Years active: 1955–2016
- Children: Céline Samie
- Awards: Ordre national du Mérite (1998)

Catherine Samie (3 February 1933 – 12 January 2026) was a French actress and member of the Comédie-Française. On 14 July 2011 she became Grand Officer of the Legion of Honor. She was a Catholic. Samie died on 12 January 2026, at the age of 92.

== Filmography ==
Year	Title	Role	Director	Notes
1956	Molière	Toinette / Nicole	Norbert Tildian	Short
1957	Lovers of Paris	Clémence	Julien Duvivier	
1960	Les Cinq Dernières Minutes	Annette	Claude Loursais	1 episode : "Qui trop embrasse"
1962	La nuit des rois	Maria	Claude Barma	TV movie
1965	Le carrosse du Saint-Sacrement	Camila Périchole	Daniel Georgeot	TV movie
1965	How to Keep the Red Lamp Burning	A resident	Gilles Grangier	Segment "La fermeture"
1967	The Oldest Profession	Toinette	Philippe de Broca	Segment "Mademoiselle Mimi"
1967	Woman Times Seven	Jeannine	Vittorio De Sica	1 episode : "Amateur Night"
1969	L'émigré de Brisbane	Laura Scaramella	Jean Pignol	TV movie
1969	Life Love Death	Julie	Claude Lelouch	
1969	Au théâtre ce soir	Armandine	Pierre Sabbagh	1 episode : "Le dindon"
1970	Elle boit pas, elle fume pas, elle drague pas, mais... elle cause!	Jannou	Michel Audiard	
1970	The Daydreamer	Clarisse Guiton	Pierre Richard	
1970	Monsieur de Pourceaugnac	Nérine	Georges Lacombe	TV movie
1970	Au théâtre ce soir	Nini		1 episode : "Un fil à la patte"
1971	Tang	Léna	André Michel	8 episodes
1971	Au théâtre ce soir	Loulou	Pierre Sabbagh (2)	3 episodes
1972	The Old Maid	Clotilde	Jean-Pierre Blanc	
1972	Elle cause plus, elle flingue	Clarisse	Michel Audiard (2)	
1972	Les femmes savantes	Martine	Jean Vernier	TV movie
1973	Georges Dandin	Claudine	Jean Dewever	TV movie
1973	Un ange au paradis	Suzanne	Jean-Pierre Blanc (2)	
1974	La grande Paulette	Denise	Gérald Calderon	
1974	Nouvelles de Henry James	Kate Cookham	Claude Chabrol	1 episode : "Le banc de la désolation"
1975	Le médecin malgré lui	Jacqueline	Lazare Iglesis	TV movie
1977	Mini-chroniques	Toinette	Jean-Marie Coldefy	1 episode : "Rêves d'enfant"
1978	Les folies Offenbach	Hortense Schneider	Michel Boisrond	TV mini-series (3 episodes)
1978	Claudine	Mlle Sergent	Édouard Molinaro	1 episode : "Claudine à l'école"
1978	Vas-y maman	The gynecologist	Nicole de Buron	
1978	On ne badine pas avec l'amour	Dame Pluche	Roger Kahane	TV movie
1979	Hothead	Mme Brochard	Jean-Jacques Annaud	
1980	Cinéma 16	Maud	Patrick Jamain	1 episode : "C'est grand chez toi"
1981	La puce et le privé	The pharmacist	Roger Kay	
1981	Les plaisirs de l'île enchantée	Mme Pernelle	Dirk Sanders	TV movie
1981	Histoire contemporaine	Mme Bergeret	Michel Boisrond (2)	TV mini-series
1981	L'épreuve	Mme Argante	Jacques Audoir	TV movie
1983	L'ami de Vincent	Odette	Pierre Granier-Deferre	
1984	Jacques le fataliste et son maître	The 'Grand deer''s hostess	Claude Santelli	TV movie
1985	The Chicks	Simone	Annick Lanoë	
1989	Tolérance	Marie-The	Pierre-Henry Salfati	
1991	Gawin	Marthe	Arnaud Sélignac	
1991	My Life Is Hell	Flo Lemonier	Josiane Balasko	
1993	Grossesse nerveuse	Antoinette	Denis Rabaglia	TV movie
1994	Julie Lescaut	Jeanne	Josée Dayan	1 episode : "Ville haute, ville basse"
1994	La guerre des privés	Mme Marony	Josée Dayan (2)	1 episode : "Tchao poulet"
1995	French Twist	The Prostitute	Josiane Balasko (2)	
1995	Jefferson in Paris	Cook	James Ivory	
1995	Ce que savait Maisie	Mme Wix	Édouard Molinaro (2)	TV movie
1996	The Green Beautiful	The midwife	Coline Serreau	
1996	Bernie	Grandmother	Albert Dupontel	
1997	Une soupe aux herbes sauvages	Old Justine	Alain Bonnot	TV movie
1997	Sous les pieds des femmes	The neighbor	Rachida Krim	
1997	Un homme digne de confiance	Aurélie's mother	Philippe Monnier	TV movie
1997	Les précieuses ridicules	Marotte	Georges Bensoussan	TV movie
1998	La mort du chinois	Jocelyne	Jean-Louis Benoît	
1999	L'impromptu de Versailles	Mlle de Brie	Georges Bensoussan (2)	TV movie
1999	Le mariage forcé	First Egyptian	Stéphane Bertin	TV movie
1999	L'école des femmes	Georgette	Michel Favart	TV movie
2000	Salsa	Letty	Joyce Buñuel	
2000	Deux femmes à Paris	Aunt Hannah	Caroline Huppert	TV movie
2002	La dernière lettre	Anna Semyonovna	Frederick Wiseman	
2003	Le Divorce	Madame Florian	James Ivory	
2003	Les femmes savantes	Bélise	Georges Bensoussan (3)	TV movie
2004	They Came Back	Martha	Robin Campillo	
2004	Victoire	The psychoanalyst	Stéphanie Murat	
2005	Independent Lens	Anna Semionovna	Frederick Wiseman (2)	1 episode : "The Last Letter/Zyklon Portrait/The Walnut Tree"
2007	Mange, ceci est mon corps	Madame's mother	Michelange Quay	
2010	22 Bullets	Stella Matteï	Richard Berry	
2010	La vénitienne	Maryvonne Levasseur	Saara Saarela	TV movie
2011	À la recherche du temps perdu	Marcel's grandmother	Nina Companeez	TV movie
2011	Gérald K Gérald		Élisabeth Rappeneau	TV movie
2016	News from Planet Mars	The mother	Dominik Moll	
2016	The Origin of Violence	Clémentine Fabre	Élie Chouraqui	
2016	Links of Life	Gisèle	Marie-Hélène Roux	
2016	Capitaine Marleau	Hadrienne Nobecourt	Josée Dayan (3)	1 episode
