= L'Affaire Labricole =

Belgian-French crime drama TV series

- French language screenshot
- Genre: Drama, Crime, Comedy
- Written by: Christian Mauron, Eric Noguet, Michel Régnier
- Directed by: Eric Noguet
- Country of origin: Belgium, Canada, France, Switzerland
- Original language: French
- No. of seasons: 1
- No. of episodes: 13

Original release
- Network: RTBF; TSR; SSR; FR3; CBC
- Release: November 10, 1979 – April 4, 1981

L'Affaire Labricole is a thriller television series aired in France, Belgium and Switzerland.

== Cast ==
- Gabriel Jabbour .... Agénor Labricole
- Fabien Kociszelski .... Pierre Labricole
- Maurice Aufair .... Fiasco
- Patrick Laval .... Ambroise Lapin

== Episodes ==
1. L'Aventure commença "comme ça"
2. Prisonniers d'Ambroise Lapin
3. Piégeurs piégés
4. La Rançon
5. Mission spéciale
6. La Nuit du microfilm
7. Bas les masques
8. La Maison hantée
9. Le Vol du bijou
10. Le Dossier Lapin
11. Chaude alerte
12. A nous deux mon bonhomme
13. Le Naufrage
