= Scrambled Eggs (1976 film) =

1976 film

- Directed by: Joël Santoni
- Written by: Jean-Claude Carrière; Jean Curtelin; Joël Santoni
- Produced by: Yves Peyrot
- Starring: Jean Carmet
- Cinematography: Walter Bal
- Edited by: Thierry Derocles
- Music by: Vladimir Cosma
- Distributed by: Warner-Columbia Film
- Release date: 31 March 1976
- Running time: 95 minutes
- Country: France
- Language: French

Scrambled Eggs (French: Les Œufs brouillés) is a 1976 French comedy film directed by Joël Santoni and starring Jean Carmet.

== Cast ==
- Jean Carmet - Marcel Dutilleul
- Jean-Claude Brialy - Brumaire
- Anna Karina - Clara Dutilleul
- Michael Lonsdale - Le Président de la République
- Michel Peyrelon - Le Ministre d'Agriculture
- Michel Aumont - Le Chef de cabinet de la Présidence
- Gabrielle Doulcet - La grand-mère
- Jean-Pierre Cassel - Le représentant du dirigeant italien
- Denise Bosc - La secrétaire d'Etat
- Christian de Tillière - Le chauffeur de Brumaire
- Lionel Vitrant - Le livreur de glaces
- Claude Legros - Le concierge de l'Elysée
- André Penvern
- Albert Michel
- Jean-Pierre Coffe - Le maire
