= Laurent Petitgirard =

French classical composer and conductor (born 1950)

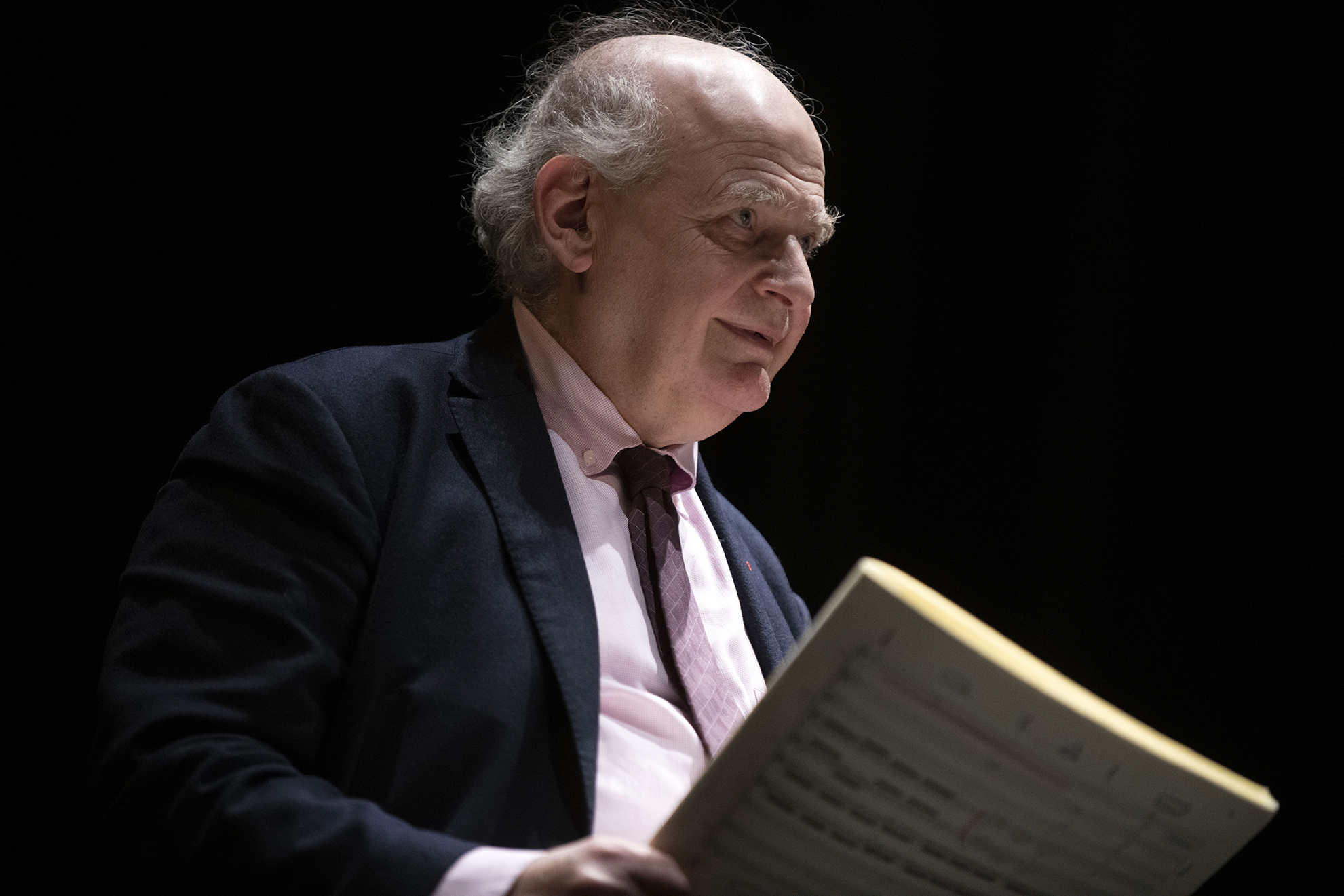
- Laurent Petitgirard
- Born: 10 June 1950 (age 75); Paris, France
- Occupations: Composer and conductor
- Organization: Permanent Secretary of the Académie des Beaux-Arts since 1 February 2017, Chairman of SACEM (2003-2005, 2007-2009, 2011-2013, 2014-2015)
- Notable work: Symphonic music, concertante music, symphonic poems, film and television scores, incidental music, operas, Maigret (music for the 1991-2006 television series), Joseph Merrick dit Elephant man (opera), Guru (opera), Si YEOU Ki (ballet).
- Style: Symphonic music, concertante music, symphonic poem, film music, incidental music, opera
- Spouse: Sonia Petrovna
- Children: Tristan Petitgirard
- Father: Serge Petitgirard
- Family: Alain Kremski
- Awards: Grand prix lycéen des compositeurs (2000), Prix Musique (2001) and Prix Opéra (2003) of the SACD
- Honours: Member and Permanent Secretary of the Académie des beaux-arts, Commander of the Order of Arts and Letters, Officer of the National Order of Merit, Commander of the National Order of the Legion of Honour
- Website: petitgirard.com

Laurent Petitgirard (born 10 June 1950, in Paris) is a French classical composer and conductor.

== Biography ==
Laurent Petitgirard was born in Paris on 10 June 1950. He studied piano with his father Serge Petitgirard, a pupil of Alfred Cortot and Yves Nat, and composition with his older brother Alain Kremski (Kremski being their mother’s name).

He has composed over twenty works of symphonic music, operas, ballets, chamber music and nearly one hundred and forty scores for film and television, in a style that is “always refined, dramatic and precisely tailored to the images”. He notably wrote the music for several films by Francis Girod and the 1991 Maigret television series. He also composes lyrical works. His first opera, Joseph Merrick dit Elephant man, with a libretto by Éric Nonn, premiered in 2002 at the Prague State Opera, under the direction of Daniel Mesguich. A new production of this opera was presented in 2005 at the Minneapolis Opera, directed by Doug Varone. His second opera, Guru (commissioned by the State), based on a libretto by Xavier Maurel, explores the subject of mental manipulation. It was recorded in Budapest for the Naxos label in October 2010 under the composer’s direction and premiered on 28 September 2018 at the Castle Opera in Szczecin (Poland) in a staging by Damien Cruden, with Laurent Petitgirard conducting, and starring Hubert Claessens, Paul Gaugler and Sonia Petrovna. A new production of Guru was presented under the composer’s direction from 24 to 28 February 2024 at the Opéra de Nice, staged by Muriel Mayette-Holtz. Recordings of his three concertos, performed by Augustin Dumay, Gérard Caussé and Gary Hoffman, of his six symphonic poems and of the complete version of Maurice Ravel’s Daphnis et Chloé, with the orchestra and chorus of the Opéra national de Bordeaux, are available on the Naxos label. The music he composed for Sonia Petrovna’s production of Antoine de Saint-Exupéry’s The Little Prince was recorded for the Naxos label in August 2013. His latest work is a ballet based on Si Yeou Ki (“Journey to the West”) for Chinese choreographer Whang Yabin (Naxos CD released in April 2023). This work, performed by the Wang Yabin Company, premiered on 29 April 2024 in Beijing and has since been presented all over China (it was performed in France in December 2018). His concerto for oboe and orchestra Souen Wou K’ong was first performed in Edinburgh and Glasgow in March 2022 with François Leleux and the Scottish Chamber Orchestra. His trio “La Croisée des Arts” will premier in Madrid in October 2024, played by the Trio Wanderer.

Laurent Petitgirard is currently composing his third opera, “Houdini”, to a libretto by Tristan Petitgirard. In 1989, he founded the Orchestre symphonique français, which he conducted until 1997. He is a conductor invited by the world’s leading orchestras, among which: the Orchestre de l'Opéra national de Paris, the Orchestre philharmonique de Monte-Carlo, the Orchestre national de France, the Orchestre national de Lyon, the Orchestre national Bordeaux Aquitaine, the Orchestre philharmonique de Nice, the Orchestre philharmonique de Strasbourg, the Bamberg Symphony Orchestra, The Deutsches Symphonie-Orchester Berlin, the Tonhalle-Orchester Zürich, the orchestra of La Fenice, the Orchestre de la Suisse Romande, the Spanish National Orchestra, the Moscow State Symphony Orchestra, the Seoul Philharmonic Orchestra, the KBS Symphony Orchestra, the China National Symphony Orchestra.

In 2004, he was elected music director of the Orchestre Colonne in Paris. His contract was periodically renewed, covering the period until June 2020. He stepped down as Music Director in April 2018, two years before the end of his term, to devote himself to composition and guest conducting. He continues to conduct the Orchestre Colonne as a guest conductor.

From 2013 to 2016, Laurent Petitgirard directed the new Music Composition for Image curriculum at the Conservatoire national supérieur de musique et de danse in Paris. He chaired the SACEM Board of Directors 8 times between 2006 and 2016. He was awarded the Grand Prix Lycéen des Compositeurs in 2000, the Prix Musique in 2001 and the Prix Opéra in 2003 by the Société des Auteurs et Compositeurs Dramatiques (SACD).

Laurent Petitgirard is a member of the Académie des Beaux-Arts (Institut de France), where he succeeded Marcel Landowski. On 1 February 2017 he was elected as its Permanent Secretary, granting him a lifelong term of office.

== Personal life ==
Laurent Petitgirard is married to actress Sonia Petrovna. His son Tristan Petitgirard is an author, director and actor.

== Honorary distinctions ==
- Officer of the National Order of the Legion of Honour.
- Officer of the National Order of Merit.
- Commander of the Order of Arts and Letters.
- Officer of the Order of Cultural Merit (Monaco).

== Works ==
=== Operas ===
- Joseph Merrick dit Elephant man (1996-1999), Éditions Durand, premiered in Prague in February 2002 and was first performed in Nice in December 2002 and in Minneapolis in 2005. Naxos CD, Marco Polo DVD.
- Guru (2006-2009) Éditions OSF Productions, Naxos CD, premiered at the Castle Opera in Szczecin in Poland on 28 September 2018, first performed in Nice in February 2024.

=== Symphonic works ===
- Souen Wou K’ong, Concerto for oboe and orchestra (2020-2021) Éditions OSF Productions
- Si Yeou Ki, Ballet (2019-2020) Éditions OSF Productions
- Dilemme, for flute, harp and string orchestra (2017) Éditions Durand
- Solitaire, Symphonic poem (2015) Éditions Durand
- États d’âme, for saxophone and orchestra (2011-2012) Éditions Durand
- Les Douze Gardiens du Temple, Symphonic poem (2003-2004) Éditions Durand
- Dialogue, for viola and orchestra (2002-2003) Éditions Durand
- Poème, for large string orchestra (2002) Éditions Durand
- Le Fou d’Elsa (2000) Éditions Durand
- Concerto for cello and orchestra (1994) Éditions Durand
- Le Marathon, Symphonic poem (1992 revised 2011) Éditions Durand
- Euphonia, symphonic poem (1988-1889 revised 2011) Éditions Durand
- Le Légendaire, Concerto for violin, choir and orchestra (1984) Éditions Durand
- Musique d’Automne, for twelve solo strings (1974) Éditions L. Alberti
- L’Arche, Ballet for 20 flutes, 4 percussions and bass (1973)

=== Chamber music ===
- Bribes (2016) trio for clarinet (or alto saxophone), cello and piano (Éditions Durand) premiered at the Tons Voisins festival in Albi in June 2016
- Le Petit Prince for mixed choir, clarinet, harp and percussion (2010), music composed for Sonia Petrovna’s show first performed at the Avignon Opera House in May 2010 (Naxos CD)
- Réflexions croisées pour violoncelle et percussion (2008), commissioned by the André Navarra competition (Éditions Durand)
- Le Temple pour piano (2005 - Éditions Durand) first performed on 20 May 2008 in Reims by Jean-Philippe Collard
- Le Plus ardent à vivre… (2001) septuor for harp, flute, clarinet and string quartet, first performed in Mulhouse on 14 June 2003 by Marielle Nordmann, Jean Ferrandis, Florent Héau and the Quatuor Chambertin (Éditions Durand)
- Le Fou d’Elsa (2000) cycle of songs on poems by Louis Aragon for alto voice, cello and piano, first performed on 20 January 2002 by Nathalie Stutzmann, Inger Södergren and François Guye (Éditions Durand)
- Le Songe de Merrick (1999) for harp solo, commissioned by the Concours Lily Laskine, premiered in Deauville in September 1999 (Éditions Durand)
- Hamelin pour violoncelle solo et récitant (1984) first performed in 1984 at the Lascours festival by Frédéric Lodéon and Sonia Petrovna (Éditions Durand)
- Suites du Marathon pour 1 et 2 pianos (1983). First performed in 1983 in Newport (USA) par Jean-Philippe Collard and Laurent Petitgirard (Éditions Mario Bois)
- Sonate pour piano et violon (1982), first performed at the Salle Gaveau and recorded in 1983 by Erick Friedman and Laurent Petitgirard (Éditions Mario Bois)
- Octuor pour 8 violoncelles solistes (1980). Revised score published in September 2000 (Éditions Mario Bois)
- Triptyque pour guitare (1979), first performed in 1980 at the Salle Pleyel in Paris and recorded in Rome in 1982 by Paolo Pilia, répertoire by Eduard Agullo (Éditions Mario Bois)
- Le Lien, text by Claude Confortès (1977) for mezzo, cello and male choir, first performed at the Salle Gaveau in Paris by Anna Ringart and René Benedetti (Éditions Mario Bois)
- Quintette avec piano (1976). First performed in 1977 at the Salle Gaveau by the Quatuor Français and Laurent Petitgirard (Éditions Mario Bois)
- Méandres pour piano (1976) first performed in 1977 by Laurent Petitgirard at the Salle Gaveau in Paris (Éditions Mario Bois)
- Prélude pour contrebasse (1975), first performed by François Rabbath in 1975 at the Salle Gaveau in Paris

=== Film and television ===
==== For the cinema ====
===== Films =====
- 1971 : La Pente douce by Claude d'Anna
- 1972 : L'Apocalypse by Jean-Claude Sée (with Alain Kremski)
- 1973 : Un officier de police sans importance by Jean Larriaga
- 1973 : L'Oiseau rare by Jean-Claude Brialy
- 1974 : Rosebud by Otto Preminger
- 1975 : La Maison des amants by Jean-Paul Sassy
- 1976 : Le Diable au cœur by Bernard Queysanne
- 1978 : L'Amant de poche by Bernard Queysanne
- 1981 : Asphalte by Denis Amar
- 1981 : Le Roi des cons by Claude Confortès (with Nicolas Errèra)
- 1982 : La Nuit de la mort by Raphaël Delpard and Richard Joffo
- 1984 : La Nuit du risque by Sergio Gobbi
- 1990 : Lacenaire by Francis Girod
- 1993 : Drôles d'oiseaux by Peter Kassovitz
- 1998 : Terminale by Francis Girod
- 1999 : Quasimodo d'El Paris by Patrick Timsit
- 2004 : Là-haut, un roi au-dessus des nuages by Pierre Schoendoerffer
- 2005 : Un ami parfait by Francis Girod
- 2008 : John Rabe by Florian Gallenberger

==== For television ====
===== Television series =====
- Maigret (50x1.5h)
- Carnet de vie (5x1h) by Éric Le Hung
- Folies Offenbach (6x1h) by Michel Boisrond
- Toutes griffes dehors (6x1h) by Michel Boisrond
- L'histoire contemporaine (4x1.5h) by Michel Boisrond
- Série rose (4x1h) by Michel Boisrond
- Police des polices (6x1h) by Michel Boisrond
- Clémence Aletti (6x1h) by Peter Kassovitz

===== Television films =====
- L'Orange amère by Roger Hanin
- Le Château-faible by Jean Larriaga
- Le Rabat-joie by Jean Larriaga
- Louis Renault by Jean Larriaga
- Marion et son tuteur by Jean Larriaga
- La Tendresse by Bernard Queysanne
- Irène et sa folie by Bernard Queysanne
- Hélas Alice est lasse by Bernard Queysanne
- Antoinette by Bernard Queysanne
- Le Billard écarlate by Bernard Queysanne
- Diane Lanster by Bernard Queysanne
- Dans la citadelle by Peter Kassovitz

===== Documentaries =====
- Sacha Guitry by Marcel Jullian
- Versailles by Gérard Corbiau
- La traque des nazis by Isabelle Clark and Daniel Costelle
- La légende vraie de la tour Eiffel, by Simon Brook

===== Animated series =====
- Crazy Cow-Boy by Mordillo-Duduyer
- The Busy World of Richard Scarry (156 × 6^{e}), CINAR – Paramount
