= Hammersmith Is Out =

1972 film by Peter Ustinov

- Theatrical release poster
- Directed by: Peter Ustinov
- Written by: Stanford Whitmore
- Produced by: Alex Lucas
- Starring: Elizabeth Taylor; Richard Burton; Peter Ustinov; Beau Bridges; Leon Ames; Leon Askin; Anthony Holland; George Raft; John Schuck
- Cinematography: Richard H. Kline
- Edited by: David E. Blewitt
- Music by: Dominic Frontiere
- Production company: J. Cornelius Crean Films Inc.
- Distributed by: Cinerama Releasing Corporation
- Release date: May 12, 1972 (United States)
- Running time: 108 minutes
- Country: United States
- Language: English

Hammersmith Is Out is a 1972 American comedy-drama film based on the legend of Faust. It is directed by Peter Ustinov, who stars in the film alongside Elizabeth Taylor, Richard Burton, and Beau Bridges.

== Plot ==
Billy Breedlove is an orderly at a Texas psychiatric hospital. He simultaneously falls under the spell of two people: a blonde waitress at a local diner named Jimmie Jean Jackson and an allegedly sociopathic hospital patient named Hammersmith, who is restrained in a straitjacket within a locked cell.

Hammersmith promises Billy a new life with fame and fortune if he is released from his incarceration. Billy agrees to free Hammersmith, provided that Jimmie Jean can accompany their escape. The three make their way into adventures where Hammersmith murders people and steals property as the means for elevating Billy's social and financial status. Billy becomes the owner of a topless bar, the owner of a pharmaceutical company, an oil tycoon, the financier of political campaigns and a roving ambassador-at-large for the United States.

Over time, Billy comes to loathe Jimmie Jean. However, Hammersmith takes an interest in her and grants her wish that she should become a mother. Hammersmith arranges for Billy to become disabled in a water skiing accident, and then convinces him to commit suicide. The head of the psychiatric hospital locates Hammersmith and has him returned to his incarceration – where he begins to promise fame and fortune to another orderly.

== Cast ==
- Elizabeth Taylor as Jimmie Jean Jackson
- Richard Burton as Hammersmith
- Peter Ustinov as Doctor
- Beau Bridges as Billy Breedlove
- Leon Ames as Gen. Sam Pembroke
- Leon Askin as Dr. Krodt
- Anthony Holland as Oldham
- George Raft as Guido Scartucci
- John Schuck as Henry Joe

== Production ==
Hammersmith Is Out was the first film financed by John Crean, the founder of Fleetwood Enterprises, Inc. a producer of recreational vehicles, travel trailers (including fold-down tent trailers) and manufactured housing. Crean told an interviewer that he ventured into the motion picture industry in search of excitement. "Boredom with business led me into movies", he said. "Believe me, there's nothing boring about motion pictures."

On June 27, 1970, Richard Burton wrote in his diary about the script:

It is very wild and formless but just the kind of thing that I would like to do at the moment. Particularly as it has a splendid part for E too, and a film for both of us is what we've been looking for a long time. Ustinov is to direct so that should be alright.... It should be wildly funny and fun to do, especially with somebody as congenial as Ustinov and as brilliant, and might be a big commercial success to boot and spur.

The casting of Burton and Taylor was announced in January 1971.

Elizabeth Taylor wanted Robert Redford to play the other male lead, but he turned down the role. Burton watched Butch Cassidy and the Sundance Kid and wrote in his diary that he felt Redford was "disappointingly ordinary and Newman is much more impressive. It is just as well that he has turned down Hammersmith as he has a quality of dullness and I can see quite easily why he has taken so long to become a star. I think he would have ruined our film simply because he seems so sluggish and certainly doesn't suggest for a second the kind of demonic idiot-ness that Billy Breedlove must have." The following night they watched The Landlord to see Beau Bridges, another candidate for the role. Burton said the actor was "nice and sloppy a la Dustin Hoffman but taller and just as plain. He won't do for our film – he's too young and too undynamic."

In February 1971, Beau Bridges joined the cast.

Ustinov called it "a variation of the Faust legend" where "the story offers a convenient structure for social comment. There are, I'm afraid, people, corporations, that 'kill', so often and so regularly that they transcend the possibility of either suspicion or penalty."

The principal photography was done in May and June 1971. Ustinov admitted before filming he was worried Bridges "might be a bit immature and a little light for the part. But we needn't have worried."

Although the film takes place in the United States, Hammersmith Is Out was shot in Mexico. (The Burtons had a villa near Puerto Vallarta.) Director Peter Ustinov had previously worked with Burton and Taylor as their co-star in the 1967 drama The Comedians. In directing Burton, Ustinov instructed the actor to convey Hammersmith's sociopathic power by never blinking.

George Raft had a small role.

== Release ==
Hammersmith Is Out opened to positive reviews. Roger Ebert, writing in the Chicago Sun-Times, called it "one of the year's best comedies" and "one of the year's best satires." Vincent Canby, reviewing the film for The New York Times, stated the film "is both too elaborate and not quite witty enough to be especially convincing as contemporary morality comedy. However, just when the patience is at the point of exhaustion, when one might leave the theater with a clear conscience, the film comes to fitful life."

Hammersmith Is Out was not commercially successful. The film was released on VHS video in the 1980, but to date it has not been released on DVD.

== Awards ==
- 22nd Berlin International Film Festival
  - Silver Bear for Best Actress: Elizabeth Taylor (won)
  - Silver Bear for outstanding artistic contribution (won)
  - Golden Bear (nominated)

== Notes ==
- Burton, Richard (2013). The Richard Burton Diaries. Yale University Press.
