= 22nd Berlin International Film Festival =

1972 film festival in West Berlin, Germany

- Location: West Berlin, Germany
- Founded: 1951
- Awards: Golden Bear: The Canterbury Tales
- Festival date: 23 June – 4 July 1972
- Website: Website

Berlin International Film Festival chronology
- 23rd 21st

The 22nd annual Berlin International Film Festival was held from 23 June to 4 July 1972. The Golden Bear was awarded to The Canterbury Tales directed by Pier Paolo Pasolini.

== Jury ==
The following people were announced as being on the jury for the festival:

- Eleanor Perry, American writer and screenwriter - Jury President
- Fritz Drobilitsch-Walden, Austrian writer, journalist and critic
- Francis Cosne, French writer and producer
- Rita Tushingham, British actress
- Tinto Brass, Italian filmmaker
- Yukichi Shinada, Japanese film critic
- Julio Coll, Spanish filmmaker
- Hans Hellmut Kirst, West-German writer
- Herbert Oberscherningkat, West-German journalist and producer

== Official Sections ==
=== Main Competition ===
The following films were in competition for the Golden Bear award:

English title	Original title	Director(s)	Production Country
A House Without Boundaries	La casa sin fronteras	Pedro Olea	Spain
The Audience	L'udienza	Marco Ferreri	Italy, France
The Bar at the Crossing	Le Bar de la Fourche	Alain Levent	France
The Bitter Tears of Petra von Kant	Die bitteren Tränen der Petra von Kant	Rainer Werner Fassbinder	West Germany
The Canterbury Tales	I racconti di Canterbury	Pier Paolo Pasolini	Italy
Closed Ward	Lukket avdeling	Arnljot Berg	Norway
Da mußte die böse Frau die ganzen Mohrrüben selber fressen		Thomas Keck	West Germany
Flyaway		Robin Lehman	United Kingdom
Hammersmith Is Out		Peter Ustinov	United States
Honeymoon	Smekmånad	Claes Lundberg	Sweden
The Hospital		Arthur Hiller	United States
In Prison Awaiting Trial	Detenuto in attesa di giudizio	Nanni Loy	Italy
João and the Knife	João e a faca	George Sluizer	Brazil, Netherlands
The Missing Clerk	Den forsvundne fuldmægtig	Gert Fredholm	Denmark
Neither by Day nor by Night	לא ביום ולא בלילה	Steven Hilliard Stern	Israel, United States
Oh, to Be on the Bandwagon!	Man sku være noget ved musikken	Henning Carlsen	Denmark
The Old Maid	La Vieille Fille	Jean-Pierre Blanc	France, Italy
Olympia – Olympia		Jochen Bauer	West Germany
Oyster Village	석화촌	Jung Jin-woo	South Korea
The Possession of Joel Delaney		Waris Hussein	United States
The Rendezvous	約束	Kōichi Saitō	Japan
Reshma and Shera	रेशमा और शेरा	Sunil Dutt	India
The Selfish Giant		Peter Sander	Canada
Traces of a Black Haired Girl	Tragovi crne devojke	Zdravko Randić	Yugoslavia
Top of the Heap		Christopher St. John	United States
Tri etide za Cathy i Miloša		Jože Pogačnik	Yugoslavia
Weekend of a Champion		Frank Simon	United Kingdom

== Official Awards ==
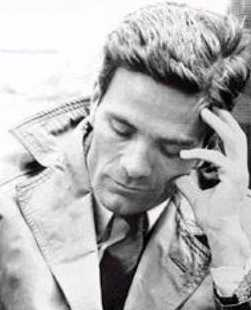
Pier Paolo Pasolini, winner of the Golden Bear at the event

The following prizes were awarded by the Jury:

- Golden Bear: The Canterbury Tales by Pier Paolo Pasolini
- Silver Bear for Best Director: Jean-Pierre Blanc for The Old Maid
- Silver Bear for Best Actress: Elizabeth Taylor for Hammersmith Is Out
- Silver Bear for Best Actor: Alberto Sordi for In Prison Awaiting Trial
- Silver Bear for an outstanding artistic achievement: Peter Ustinov for Hammersmith Is Out
- Silver Bear Extraordinary Jury Prize: The Hospital by Arthur Hiller
