= Jean-Claude Bouillaud =

French actor (1927–2008)

- Born: 7 June 1927; Le Havre, Seine-Maritime, France
- Died: 20 June 2008 (aged 81); Angers, Maine-et-Loire, France
- Occupation: Actor
- Years active: 1969–2004 (actor)

Jean-Claude Bouillaud (7 June 1927 – 20 June 2008) was a French film and television actor.

== Biography ==
Jean-Claude Bouillaud is the son of Charles Bouillaud, prolific actor from the 1940s to the 1960s. He first worked for about fifteen years as a bank employee. After a career in the amateur theater, he became a professional actor playing with Philippe Noiret at the Théâtre National Populaire with Jean Vilar as a director. A background and supporting actor, unknown but familiar to the audience, he was very popular with film directors like Claude Chabrol, Claude Sautet and Yannick Andréi. In television, he acted in many crime series.

== Partial filmography ==
- Mr. Freedom (1969)
- The Bar at the Crossing (1972) .... Carletti
- Au-delà de la peur (1975)
- Womanlight (1979) .... Le pilote de ligne
- Laisse-moi rêver (1979) .... fireman
- L'Entourloupe (1980) .... grocery store owner
- The Horse of Pride (1980)
- A Bad Son (1980) .... Henri
- La Provinciale (1980)
- La Boum (1980) .... Boum father #2
- Bobo la tête (1980)
- Celles qu'on n'a pas eues (1981)
- Les hommes préfèrent les grosses (1981) .... fishmonger
- Le Choix des armes (1981) .... André
- Le Professionnel (1981) .... Agent service secret #2
- Tête à claques (1982) .... bistrot owner
- The Hatter's Ghost (1982) .... Louise's father
- Le Père Noël est une ordure (1982) .... Katia's father
- Tir groupé (1982)
- La Java des ombres (1983) .... cab driver
- Waiter! (1983) .... Urbain
- Ronde de nuit (1984) .... Jérôme Martineau, a civil servant
- Le Joli Cœur (1984) .... Ducasse
- Pinot simple flic (1984) .... embarrassed policeman
- Tir à vue (1984) .... Blanchard
- My New Partner (1984) .... a guard
- The Twin (1984) .... the inspector
- Hors-la-loi (1985) .... first policeman
- Chicken with Vinegar (1985) .... Gérard Filiol
- La Baston (1985) .... Raymond Levasseur
- Black Mic-Mac (1986) .... Bidault
- Charlie Dingo (1987) .... garage mechanic
- A los cuatro vientos (1987)
- Trois places pour le 26 (1988) .... captain
- Eskorpion (1989) .... Fermin
- Le Vent de la Toussaint (1991) .... hotel owner
- Madame Bovary (1991) .... Father Rouault, a farmer, Emma's father
- A Heart in Winter (1992) .... bar owner
- Lettre pour L... (1993)
- Justinien Trouvé, ou le bâtard de Dieu (1993)
- Les Misérables (1995) .... brigadier in 1830
