= Adolescence (film) =

1966 film directed by Marin Karmitz

- Directed by: Marin Karmitz
- Produced by: Vladimir Forgency; Marin Karmitz
- Narrated by: Sonia Petrovna
- Release date: 1966
- Running time: 22 minutes
- Country: France
- Language: French

Adolescence is a 1966 French short documentary film directed by Marin Karmitz. It was nominated for an Academy Award for Best Documentary Short.

== Cast ==
- Sonia Petrovna
- Madame Egorowa
- Marielle Liberge
- Barbara Pearce
- Anne Cardona
- Thérèse Thoreux
- Maryse Bergdou
- Nicole Raguis
- Eric Schlumberger
- Lucien Legrand
