= Womanlight =

- Directed by: Costa-Gavras
- Screenplay by: Costa-Gavras
- Based on: Clair de femme by Romain Gary
- Produced by: Georges-Alain Vuille
- Starring: Yves Montand; Romy Schneider
- Cinematography: Ricardo Aronovich
- Music by: Jean Musy
- Production companies: Les Films Corona; Société des Films Gibe; Parva Cinematografica; Janus Filmproduktion
- Distributed by: Gaumont Distribution (France); Constantin Film (West Germany)
- Release date: 1979
- Running time: 105 minutes
- Countries: France; Italy; West Germany
- Language: French

Womanlight (French: Clair de femme) is a 1979 film by Costa-Gavras based on the 1977 novel Clair de femme by Romain Gary.

== Cast ==
- Yves Montand as Michel Follin
- Romy Schneider as Lydia Tovalski
- Romolo Valli as Galba
- Lila Kedrova as Sonia Tovalski
- Heinz Bennent as Georges
- Roberto Benigni as The barman
- Dieter Schidor as Sven Svensson
- Catherine Allégret as The prostitute
- François Perrot as Alain
- Daniel Mesguich as Inspector Curbec
- Gabriel Jabbour as Sacha
- Jean-Claude Bouillaud as The pilot
- Gabriel Dussurget as The theater director
- Jacques Dynam as The taxi
- Jean Reno as The cop
- Michel Robin as The doctor
- Miranda Campa as The maid
- Giuliana Calandra
