= Un ange au paradis =

1973 French film by Jean-Pierre Blanc

- Directed by: Jean-Pierre Blanc
- Screenplay by: Jean-Pierre Blanc
- Produced by: Raymond Danon
- Starring: Michel Aumont; Catherine Samie; Bulle Ogier; Roland Dubillard; Tilda Thamar; Claudine Beccarie
- Cinematography: Claude Lecomte
- Edited by: Jacqueline Thiédot
- Music by: Michel Magne
- Production company: Lira Films
- Release date: 11 October 1973 (France)
- Running time: 90
- Country: France
- Language: French

Un ange au paradis is a French comedy drama directed by Jean-Pierre Blanc, released in 1973.

== Synopsis ==
Mouton, an employee of a funeral home, marries former prostitute Suzanne. After she has to return to this profession, Mouton falls in love with Marie-Ange, a streetwalking "travesti".

== Cast ==
- Michel Aumont as Mouton
- Catherine Samie as Suzanne
- Bulle Ogier as Rita
- Mimi Young as Francine
- Roland Dubillard as Basset
- Tilda Thamar as Gerda
- Valérie Wilson as Marie-Ange
- Raymond Gérôme
