= Valérie Wilson =

French actress (1953–2011)

- Born: 1953
- Died: 20 October 2011 (aged 57–58)
- Occupation: Actress
- Years active: 1969-1975
- Notable work: Un flic

Valérie Wilson (1953, Paris - 20 October 2011) was a French actress. As a trans woman, she played trans characters in movies such as Un flic, before retiring from public life.

== Life ==
Little is known of Valerie besides her career. She was out and started transition before her movie career, that is in her teenage years. Her first movie role was a transgender friend of a cisgender main character Justine in the sex comedy La Michetonneuse, filmed in 1969-1970. The press kit claimed that she was 19 during the time of filming (with her mother supposedly having to sign the movie contract), and that she worked as a model and striptease dancer (likely in the female impersonation cabaret L’Alcazar, where some of the film was shot). This led to her next role in Un flic, a trans police informant implied to have had a romantic/sexual backstory with Alain Delon's police officer. In 1973 she played a "travesti" sex worker in Un ange au paradis, and was interviewed to promote it for public channel C3 show Chutes on tourne, the only known interview with her. After playing an implicitly cisgender character in 1975 Change pas de main, she withdrew from public life, a decision possibly influenced by the fetishization she experienced from the media and that affected roles available for trans women at the time. Her death was reported by her friend and archivist of French trans cabaret history, Diane Peggy Guex.

== Filmography ==
- 1972: La Michetonneuse by Francis Leroi: Valérie
- 1972: Un flic by Jean-Pierre Melville: nameless character (billed as “transvestite”)
- 1973: Un ange au paradis by Jean-Pierre Blanc: Marie-Ange Bystrzanowiez
- 1975: Change pas de main by Paul Vecchiali: Mylène
