= Clair de femme =

1977 novel by Romain Gary

Clair de femme is a 1977 novel by Romain Gary. It formed the basis for the 1979 French film Womanlight directed by Costa-Gavras, and was also adapted several times for the theatre.
