= Gabriel Jabbour =

French actor

- Born: 7 November 1922; Alexandria, Kingdom of Egypt
- Died: 20 September 1987 (aged 64); Le Kremlin-Bicêtre, France
- Occupation: Actor

Gabriel Jabbour (Arabic: غبريال جبّور) (7 November 1922 – 20 September 1987) was a French actor.

He made his debut in acting in 1957 in L'affaire Sarret-Schmidt on television. Between then and 1987 he made almost 70 appearances in film and TV with his career at its peak in the 1970s.

In 1981 Jabbour appeared in the thriller series Affaire Labricole, L.

He retired from acting in 1987.

== Partial filmography ==
- Goha (1958) - Sayed Khamis
- Suivez-moi jeune homme (1958) - Chauffeur de taxi
- The Burning Court (1962) - Le Bijoutier
- La Poupée (1962) - Joachim
- Trafics dans l'ombre (1964) - Lamorie
- Les pieds dans le plâtre (1965) - M. Gaby
- Mazel Tov ou le Mariage (1968) - M. Avram
- Z (1969) - Bozzini (uncredited)
- Jeff (1969) - Zucci
- Et qu'ça saute! (1970)
- Donkey Skin (1970) - Le chef des tailleurs
- Le Viager (1972) - M. Levasseur, le patron de Martinet
- The Bar at the Crossing (1972) - Mosé
- Far West (1973) - Véronique
- O.K. patron (1974) - Aram Kampessian
- Un nuage entre les dents (1974) - Casenave
- Le trouble-fesses (1976) - Le droguiste
- Body of My Enemy (1976) - Blome
- The Porter from Maxim's (1976) - L'ambassadeur
- La nuit de Saint-Germain-des-Prés (1977) - Brandonnel
- Dear Inspector (1977) - Le médecin Légiste
- Madame Rosa (1977) - Monsieur Hamil
- La nuit, tous les chats sont gris (1977) - Monsieur Banalesco
- Et vive la liberté! (1978)
- State Reasons (1978) - Meslan
- Womanlight (1979) - Sacha
- La flambeuse (1981) - Le professeur
- Julien Fontanes, magistrat (1981, TV Series) - Vestria
- Le secret des sélénites (1983) - (voice)
- Three Men and a Cradle (1985) - Le supérieur
- La galette du roi (1986) - le prince arabe Abdallah Ibn
