= Murmur of the Heart =

1971 film by Louis Malle

- Theatrical release poster
- French: Le souffle au cœur
- Directed by: Louis Malle
- Screenplay by: Louis Malle
- Produced by: Vincent Malle; Claude Nedjar
- Starring: Lea Massari; Benoît Ferreux
- Cinematography: Ricardo Aronovich
- Edited by: Suzanne Baron
- Music by: Gaston Frèche; Sidney Bechet; Henri Renaud; Charlie Parker
- Production companies: Nouvelles Éditions de Films; Marianne Productions; Vides Cinematografica; Franz Seitz Filmproduktion
- Distributed by: Cinema International Corporation
- Release dates: 28 April 1971 (France); 20 October 1971 (Italy)
- Running time: 118 minutes
- Countries: France; Italy; West Germany
- Language: French
- Box office: $1.1 million

Murmur of the Heart (French: Le souffle au cœur) is a 1971 French comedy-drama film written, produced, and directed by Louis Malle, and starring Lea Massari, Benoît Ferreux, and Daniel Gélin. Semi-autobiographical for Malle, the film tells a coming-of-age story about a 14-year-old boy (Ferreux) growing up in bourgeois surroundings in post-World War II Dijon, France, and his complex relationship with his Italian-born mother (Massari).

The film was screened at the 1971 Cannes Film Festival and was a box-office success in France. In the United States, it received positive reviews and a nomination for the Academy Award for Best Original Screenplay.

== Plot ==
Laurent Chevalier is a 14-year-old boy living in Dijon in 1954 who loves jazz, always receives the highest grades in his class, and opposes the First Indochina War. He has an unloving father, Charles, a gynecologist; an affectionate Italian-born mother, Clara; and two older brothers, Thomas and Marc. Thomas and Marc are inveterate pranksters, while Laurent engages in taboos such as shoplifting and masturbation. When Laurent discovers Clara has a lover, he is upset by the adultery and runs to tell Charles, who, busy with his practice, angrily turns Laurent away.

One night, Thomas and Marc take Laurent to a brothel, where Laurent loses his virginity to a prostitute, Freda, before they are disrupted by his drunken brothers. Upset, Laurent leaves for scouting camp, where he catches scarlet fever and is left with a heart murmur. Bedridden for a month, he is cared for and entertained by Clara and their maid, Augusta. Laurent's teacher at his Catholic school suggests that Laurent's illness has matured him, so that he has made progress in his studies, and urges Clara to treat him more like an adult.

As Laurent requires treatment at a sanatorium, he and Clara travel there and check into a hotel. Due to an error by Charles's secretary, the hotel books both Clara and Laurent into a single room, but, as the hotel is completely full, no additional room is available. Laurent takes interest in two young girls at the hotel, Hélène and Daphne, and also spies on his mother in the bathtub. Though Laurent pursues Hélène, Hélène says she is not ready for sex; Laurent later accuses her of being a lesbian. Clara temporarily leaves with her lover, but comes back distraught after their breakup, and Laurent comforts her.

After a night of heavy drinking on Bastille Day, Laurent and his mother have sex. Clara tells her son afterward that this incest will not be repeated, but that they should not regret it. Laurent leaves their room, and, after unsuccessfully trying to seduce Hélène, spends the night with Daphne. When he returns to his room late in the morning, his father and brothers are there, having come for a visit, and immediately deduce what has happened. Clara enters the room, and the whole family breaks into prolonged laughter.

== Cast ==
- Lea Massari as Clara Chevalier, Laurent's mother
- Benoît Ferreux as Laurent "Renzino" Chevalier
- Daniel Gélin as Charles Chevalier, Laurent's father
- Michael Lonsdale as Father Henri
- Ave Ninchi as Augusta, the Chevalier's maid
- Gila von Weitershausen as Freda, a prostitute
- Fabien Ferreux as Thomas Chevalier, Laurent's older brother
- Marc Winocourt as Marc Chevalier, Laurent's older brother
- Micheline Bona as Aunt Claudine
- Henri Poirier as Uncle Léonce
- Liliane Sorval as Fernande, a hydrotherapy nurse
- Corinne Kersten as Daphné, a brunette teenager
- Eric Walter as Laurent's younger blond friend
- François Werner as Hubert Bizot, an elitist teenager
- Jacqueline Chauvaud as Hélène, a blonde teenager
- Yvon Lec as the older priest at Laurent's school
- Annie Savarin as the Chevalier's cook
- Jacques Sereys as Laurent's doctor

== Production ==
Malle incorporated numerous autobiographical elements into Murmur of the Heart, saying: "My passion for jazz, my curiosity about literature, the tyranny of my two elder brothers, how they introduced me to sex—this is pretty close to home." He also suffered from a heart murmur and shared a hotel room with his mother during treatment.

Aside from those elements, the film is fictional, and it takes place after the time period when Malle was a child. The humorous, earthy Italian mother is also a fictional character, based more on a friend's mother than Malle's own. He asserted in interviews that the incest, in particular, is fictional. When he started writing the script, he did not intend to introduce incest, but ended up doing so as he explored an intense mother–son relationship.

The National Center of Cinematography objected to the screenplay's erotic scenes, surprising Malle. With the Censorship Board denying funding, the film was financed with the help of Mariane Film, a French subsidiary of Paramount Pictures.

Of the incest scene, Massari said, "We shot that scene last and it was a great concern throughout the entire shoot. On the last day Malle said to me, 'do what you want, if it comes out well we'll keep it, if not we'll do as I say.' I acted on instinct, loading the fact that the woman was drunk, and the scene stayed as is."

Given his love of jazz, Malle has Laurent steal a Charlie Parker album at the beginning of the film, and draws from Parker's music for the film score.

== Release ==
In France, the film had 2,652,870 admissions. It was screened at the Cannes Film Festival in May 1971, and played at the New York Film Festival in October 1971.

On its re-release in the United States in 1989, the film grossed $1,160,784. The Criterion Collection released the film on Region 1 DVD in 2006, along with Malle's films Lacombe, Lucien (1974) and Au revoir les enfants (1987).

== Reception ==
=== Critical reception ===
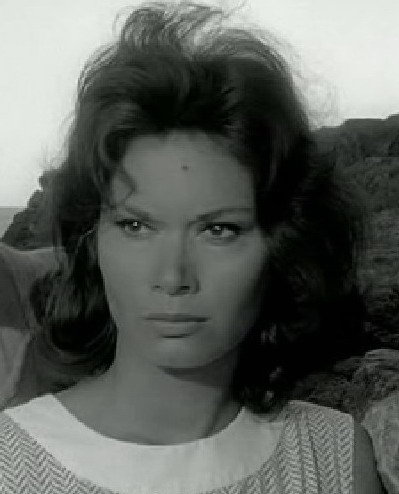
Italian actress Lea Massari received positive reviews for her performance.

Roger Ebert gave the film four out of four stars, comparing it favorably to The 400 Blows (1959). He wrote of the incest that Malle "takes the most highly charged subject matter you can imagine, and mutes it into simple affection." Judith Crist, writing for New York, praised the "remarkable" performances of Lea Massari, Benoît Ferreux, and Daniel Gélin. Richard Schickel, writing for Life, said he had a "strange enthusiasm" for the film, which he felt demonstrated "taste, charm and the most winning sentiment." Variety staff complimented Ferreux and Massari's performances. In The New York Times, Roger Greenspun wrote that the film "isn't very good" and "that it could probably have been made with as much distinction by any of those directors, all equally anonymous, who specialize in urban romantic comedy (or tragedy) of a sophistication that is supposed to be peculiarly French." John Simon wrote that Murmur of the Heart treats incest charmingly, but unsatisfactorily.

Pauline Kael, critic for The New Yorker, wrote that the film is like "a fine old jazz record, but when it's over it has the kick of a mule, a funny kick". She described Massari as "superb".

In 1989, Desson Howe wrote in The Washington Post that the film maintained its "fresh intelligence and delicacy", and that "Malle's world of sarcastic, upper-middle-class brats seems to be Murmur's most enduring creation." In 1990, Richard Stengel gave the film an A− in Entertainment Weekly, writing: "Almost everything about this coming-of-age story rings true, and Malle avoids any heavy-handed explanations of family behavior." In his 2002 Movie & Video Guide, Leonard Maltin gave the film three-and-a-half out of four stars, calling it a "fresh, intelligent, affectionately comic tale". On the review aggregator website Rotten Tomatoes, the film has an approval rating of 94% based on 18 critics' reviews.

Director Wes Anderson has cited Murmur of the Heart as an influence, saying he loves the characters of Laurent and Clara. Of the incest, he said: "The stuff between him and the mother feels more kind of romantic almost—but also taboo and scary in a way, which makes it even more seductive." Director Noah Baumbach has also named the film as an influence.

=== Accolades ===
Murmur of the Heart was nominated for Best Original Screenplay at the 45th Academy Awards. It was also in competition, in the French part of the official selection, at the 1971 Cannes Film Festival.

Award	Date of ceremony	Category	Recipient(s)	Result	Ref(s)
Academy Awards	27 March 1973	Best Original Screenplay	Louis Malle	Nominated	
National Society of Film Critics	24 December 1971	Best Screenplay	Louis Malle	3rd Place	
New York Film Critics Circle	23 January 1972	Best Actress	Lea Massari	5th Place	
