= News from Planet Mars =

- Theatrical release poster
- Directed by: Dominik Moll
- Written by: Dominik Moll; Gilles Marchand
- Produced by: Michel Saint-Jean; Patrick Quinet; Philippe Logie
- Starring: François Damiens; Vincent Macaigne
- Cinematography: Jean-François Hensgens
- Edited by: Margot Meynier
- Music by: Adrian Johnston
- Production companies: France 3 Cinéma; Diaphana Films; Artémis Productions; Euro Media France; VOO; BE TV; Shelter Prod
- Distributed by: Diaphana Films (France)
- Release dates: 17 February 2016 (Berlinale); 9 March 2016 (France)
- Running time: 101 minutes
- Countries: France; Belgium
- Language: French
- Budget: $7 million
- Box office: $425.000

News from Planet Mars (original title: Des nouvelles de la planète Mars) is a 2016 French-Belgian comedy film directed by Dominik Moll.

== Plot ==
Computer engineer Philippe Mars has always considered himself a prudent person, a husband, father, brother, and a employee. However, his life becomes disrupted. Strange things begin to happen to his family: his wife becomes difficult, his son has become a vegetarian, his daughter dreams of a career, and his sister sells paintings of her naked parents for high price. Added to this is a colleague from work who moves into Philippe’s apartment due to certain circumstances.

== Cast ==
- François Damiens as Philippe Mars
- Vincent Macaigne as Jérôme
- Veerle Baetens as Chloé
- Jeanne Guittet as Sarah Mars
- Tom Rivoire as Grégoire Mars
- Michel Aumont as The father
- Catherine Samie as The mother
- Philippe Laudenbach as The neighbor
- Olivia Côte as Fabienne / Xanaé
- Léa Drucker as Myriam
- Julien Sibre as Gordon
