= Coup de tête =

1979 film

- Theatrical release poster
- Directed by: Jean-Jacques Annaud
- Screenplay by: Francis Veber
- Story by: Alain Godard
- Produced by: Alain Poiré
- Starring: Patrick Dewaere
- Cinematography: Claude Agostini
- Edited by: Noëlle Boisson
- Music by: Pierre Bachelet
- Production companies: Gaumont; SFP
- Distributed by: Gaumont Distribution
- Release date: 14 February 1979 (France)
- Running time: 89 minutes
- Country: France
- Language: French
- Box office: 902,144 admissions (France)

Coup de tête (English: Hothead) is a 1979 French comedy-drama film directed by Jean-Jacques Annaud and scripted by Francis Veber. It stars Patrick Dewaere and Jean Bouise, the latter winning the César Award for Best Actor in a Supporting Role for his performance.

== Plot ==
François Perrin is a belligerent factory worker who plays football for a local amateur team, in a club owned by a rich businessman who also owns the factory where Perrin, as well as most of the population of Trincamp, works. His attitude doesn't endear him to anyone, and the situation is not helped when, at a training session, he pushes Berthier, the star and captain of the team, who demands that Perrin be expelled. Soon thereafter, he is also fired from his job, the whole town turns against him and he is even prohibited from entering the local bar. When a drunk Berthier tries to rape a woman one night, Perrin is immediately framed for the deed, and ends up in jail after being brutalized by the police. Two months later, the Trincamp team is to participate in an important game for the France's Cup, but the bus carrying the team gets into an accident, and out of desperation to replace the injured players, Perrin is released from jail to help out the team. While on the way to the stadium, he manages to evade police and finds the rape victim and confronts her. Rather than resulting in conflict, he actually finds someone who believes him, since she was not positive in her earlier identification, and she decides to investigate the testimonies that convicted Perrin, while he goes on to play and scores both of his team's goals in a very tight victory. Perrin is now the town's hero, and he uses that position and the knowledge of who did what and who made false reports to the police to plot a subtle but effective revenge on those who have wronged him.

== Cast ==
- Patrick Dewaere - François Perrin
- France Dougnac - Stéphanie Lefebvre
- Dorothée Jemma - Marie
- Maurice Barrier - Berri, the 'Penalty' bar patron
- Robert Dalban - Jean-Jean, the manager general
- Mario David - Rumin, the physical therapist
- Hubert Deschamps - the prison warden
- Dora Doll - the chief nun
- François Dyrek - the first truck driver
- Patrick Floersheim - Berthier, Trincamp star player
- Michel Fortin - Langlumey, the coach
- Jacques Frantz - the second truck driver
- Gérard Hernandez - the police lieutenant
- Claude Legros - Poilane, the waiter
- Corinne Marchand - Madame Sivardière
- Jean Bouise - the CEO Mr Sivardière
- Michel Aumont - Brochard, Fiat cars dealer
- Catherine Samie - Mme Brochard
- Paul Le Person - Lozerand, the furniture dealer
- Jean-Pierre Darroussin - the photographer (uncredited)

== See also ==
- List of association football films
