= Joël Santoni =

French film director

- Born: 5 November 1943; Fez, Morocco
- Died: 18 April 2018 (aged 74)
- Occupations: Film director, screenwriter
- Years active: 1972-2018

Joël Santoni (5 November 1943 – 18 April 2018) was a French film director and screenwriter. He directed the 1976 film Scrambled Eggs, which starred Jean Carmet and Anna Karina.

== Selected filmography ==
- La Course en tête (1974), documentary on Belgian cyclist Eddy Merckx; soundtrack with music by David Munrow released as Renaissance Suite in 1974
- Scrambled Eggs (1976)
- Maintenant et pour toujours (1998), TV film
