= Lea Massari =

Italian actress (1933–2025)

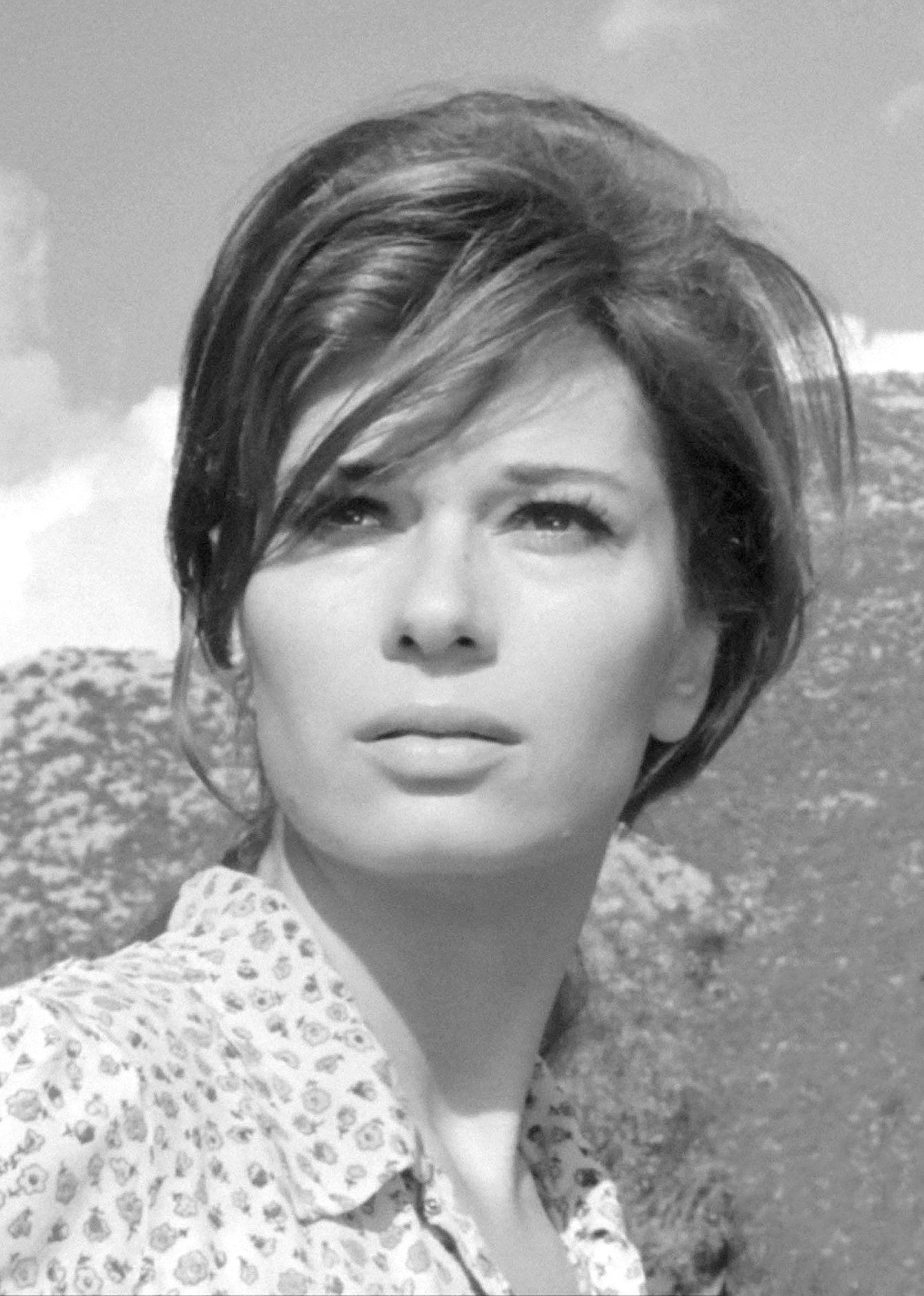
- Massari in The Camp Followers (1965)
- Born: Anna Maria Massatani; 30 June 1933; Rome, Kingdom of Italy
- Died: 23 June 2025 (aged 91); Rome, Italy
- Occupations: Actress; singer
- Years active: 1954–1990
- Spouse: Carlo Bianchini (m. 1963; div. 2004)

Anna Maria Massatani (30 June 1933 – 23 June 2025), known professionally as Lea Massari, was an Italian actress and singer. Her international breakout role as Anna in Michelangelo Antonioni's L'Avventura (1960) established her as an icon of European art cinema. She won the Nastro d'Argento for Best Supporting Actress twice, and was nominated for the David di Donatello for Best Actress once.

== Early life ==
Massari was born Anna Maria Massatani in Rome, and was raised variously in Spain, France, and Switzerland. She originally studied architecture at university, while working as a model for costume and production designer Piero Gherardi. She adopted her stage name at the age of 22, after the sudden death of her fiancé Leo.

== Career ==
Massari became known in art cinema for two roles: the missing girl Anna in Michelangelo Antonioni's L'Avventura (1960), and as Clara, the mother of a sexually precocious 14-year-old boy named Laurent (Benoît Ferreux) in Louis Malle's Murmur of the Heart (1971). She began to receive critical acclaim in 1961 after her performance in A Difficult Life (Una vita difficile), directed by Dino Risi, earning her a special David di Donatello award.

Massari worked in both Italian and French cinema. Her career includes Sergio Leone's debut The Colossus of Rhodes (Il Colosso di Rodi, 1961) and international commercial films such as The Things of Life (Les choses de la vie, 1970).

Massari was a member of the jury at the Cannes Film Festival in 1975.

Massari won the Nastro d'Argento for Best Supporting Actress award for her appearance in Francesco Rosi's Christ Stopped at Eboli (Cristo si è fermato a Eboli, 1979).

== Death ==
Massari died on 23 June 2025, one week before her 92nd birthday.

== Partial filmography ==
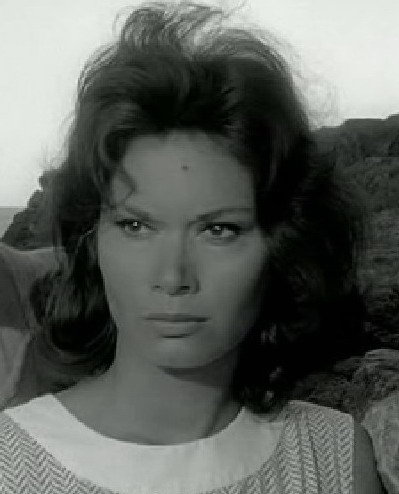
Massari in L'Avventura (1960)

- Proibito (1955) – Agnese Barras
- Dreams in a Drawer (1957) – Lucia Moretti
- Resurrection (1958) – Marja Pawlowna
- L'avventura (1960) – Anna
- From a Roman Balcony (1960) – Freja
- Il Colosso di Rodi (1961) – Diala
- A Difficult Life (1961) – Elena Pavinato
- Morte di un bandito (1961) – Santa
- Dreams Die at Dawn (1961) – Anna Miklos
- Le Monte-charge (1962) – Marthe Dravet
- The Four Days of Naples (1962) – Maria (uncredited)
- The Captive City (1962) – Lelia Mendores
- Weeping for a Bandit (1964) – María Jerónima
- The Unvanquished (1964) – Dominique Servet
- La coda del diavolo (1964)
- The Camp Followers (1965) – Toula Demantritza
- Made in Italy (1965) – Monica (segment "1 'Usi e costumi', episode 3")
- Garden of Delights (1967) – Carlo's mistress
- Volver a vivir (1968) – María
- I Want Him Dead (1968) – Aloma
- Les Choses de la vie (1970) – Catherine Bérard
- Céleste (1970) – Hélène
- Senza via d'uscita (1970) – Britt
- Murmur of the Heart (1971) – Clara Chevalier
- Paolo e Francesca (1971)
- And Hope to Die (1972) – Sugar
- Indian Summer (1972) – Monica
- The Woman in Blue (1973) – Aurélie
- Escape to Nowhere (1973) – Maria Menela
- Le Fils (1973) – Maria
- Story of a Love Story (1973) – Woman
- La Main à couper (1974) – Hélène Noblet
- Allonsanfàn (1974) – Charlotte
- Fear Over the City (1975) – Nora Elmer
- Chi dice donna dice donna (1976) – Gilbert (segment "Papa e maman")
- L'Ordinateur des pompes funèbres (1976) – Gloria
- La linea del fiume (1976) – Amanda Treves
- Violette et François (1977) – Mère de François
- Faces of Love (1977) – Cecilia
- El perro (1977) – Muriel
- Antonio Gramsci: The Days of Prison (1977) – Tania
- Dirty Dreamer (1978) – Joséphe
- Les Rendez-vous d'Anna (1978) – La mère d'Anna
- Christ Stopped at Eboli (1979) – Luisa Levi
- Le Divorcement (1979) – Rosa
- La Flambeuse (1981) – Louise
- Sarah (1983) – Carla Angelli
- La Septième Cible (1984) – Nelly
- Secrets Secrets (1984) – Marta, Laura's Mother
- Viaggio d'amore (1990) – Zaira (final film role)
