= Alain Levent =

French cinematographer

- Born: 15 September 1934; Paris, France
- Died: 28 August 2008 (aged 73); Paris, France
- Occupations: Cinematographer, film director
- Years active: 1960–2007

Alain Levent (15 September 1934 – 28 August 2008) was a French cinematographer and film director. He worked on 80 films between 1960 and 2007. His 1972 film The Bar at the Crossing was entered into the 22nd Berlin International Film Festival.

== Selected filmography ==
- Cléo from 5 to 7 (1962)
- The Thief of Tibidabo (1964)
- The Nun (1966)
- It Rains in My Village (1968)
- Les Gauloises bleues (1968)
- My Uncle Benjamin (1969)
- L'amour fou (1969)
- Atlantic Wall (1970)
- The Bar at the Crossing (1972 - directed)
- Far West (1973)
- The Irony of Chance (1974)
- Dracula and Son (1976)
