= La Ville dont le prince est un enfant (film) =

- Also known as: La Ville dont le prince est un enfant The Fire That Burns
- Created by: Henry de Montherlant (play); Didier Decoin (adaptation)
- Directed by: Christophe Malavoy
- Starring: Christophe Malavoy; Michel Aumont; Naël Marandin; Clément van den Bergh
- Country of origin: France
- Original language: French

Production
- Producer: Dominique Antoine
- Cinematography: Bernard Lutic
- Editor: Noëlle Boisson
- Running time: 91 minutes

Original release
- Network: France 2
- Release: 7 March 1997

La Ville dont le prince est un enfant is a 1997 made-for-television film adapted from a 1951 play by French dramatist Henry de Montherlant of the same title.

The title, literally translated, The City Where the Prince is a Child, is taken from Ecclesiastes 10:16: "Woe to thee, O land, when thy king is a child, and thy princes eat in the morning!"

The French-language film was subsequently released in North American markets on DVD in 2004 under the title, The Fire That Burns, similar to the 1977 English language translation of the play produced in 1977 under the title, The Fire that Consumes.

== Summary ==
Philosophy student André Sevrais (played by Naël Marandin) attends a Catholic boys' school in Paris, where he becomes fast friends with his younger schoolmate, a little rebellious boy named Serge Souplier (played by Clément van den Bergh). This friendship between the two youngsters does not go unobserved by the Abbot of Pradts (played by Christophe Malavoy), who harbors a secret obsession with Souplier and uses his position of authority to try to handle the adolescent Sevrais, with the pretext of protecting the youngster Souplier; ultimately, however, he is undone by his own hand.

== Cast ==
- Christophe Malavoy – Abbot of Pradts
- Naël Marandin – André Sevrais
- Clément van den Bergh – Serge Souplier
- Michel Aumont – The Father Superior
- Pierre-Arnaud Juin – Habert
- Pierre-Alexis Hollenbeck – Linsbourg
- Michel Dussauze – Prial
- Luc Levy – Unskilled laborer
- Alain Gilbert – Cantene supervisor
- Luc Denoux – Music master
