= Benoît Ferreux =

French actor

- Born: 29 September 1955 (age 70); Bordeaux, France
- Occupation: Actor
- Years active: 1971–present

Benoît Ferreux (French pronunciation: [bənwa fɛʁø]; born 29 September 1955) is a French film, television and stage actor who is possibly best recalled internationally for his role in the 1971 film Murmur of the Heart.

== Career as a child actor ==
Benoît Ferreux was born in Bordeaux. In early 1970, at age 14, he was cast to appear in director Louis Malle's 1971 coming-of-age drama Murmur of the Heart (French: Le souffle au cœur). Set in 1954, Ferreux played Laurent Chevalier, a boy living in Dijon who is coming to terms with his burgeoning sexuality and his close relationship with his Italian mother Clara (portrayed by Lea Massari), which ultimately leads to an incestuous liaison at a sanatorium where he is being treated for a heart murmur. The film was selected for competition at the 1971 Cannes Film Festival.

The same year, Ferreux appeared alongside actors Catherine Deneuve and Marcello Mastroianni in the Nadine Trintignant directed drama It Only Happens to Others (French: Ça n'arrive qu'aux autres).

== Later career ==
Ferreux would go on to appear in a number of roles as an adult in his native France in film and television. In 1981, he appeared in the John Huston-directed English language drama Escape to Victory with actors Sylvester Stallone, Michael Caine, Max von Sydow and Brazilian footballer Pelé.

In 2007 he appeared in the Alain Corneau-directed crime thriller The Second Wind (French: Le Deuxième souffle), starring Daniel Auteuil and Monica Bellucci. In 2010 he had a small role in the Alain Corneau-directed Crime d'amour (English: Love Crime).

== Selected filmography ==
- Murmur of the Heart (1971) - Laurent Chevalier
- It Only Happens to Others (1971)
- The Guerrilla (1973)
- Défense de savoir (1973)
- La Messe dorée (1975) - Gary
- Mélodrame (1976) - Johnny
- Violette Nozière (1978)
- L'enfant secret (1979)
- Le Maître-nageur (1979) - Le garagiste
- Moonraker (1979) - Moonraker Pilot #2 (uncredited)
- Premier voyage (1980) - Charles
- Escape to Victory (1981) - Jean Paul Rémy
- Five Days One Summer (1982) - French Student
- Until September (1984) - Willager
- Je hais les acteurs (1986) - Assistant
- Sale destin (1987) - Killer
- Le Brasier (1991) - Boxer
- Gwladys (2005)
- The Second Wind (2007) - Marcel le Stéphanois
- Love Crime (2010) - Le cadre coléreux
- Fever (2014) - François
