= The Bar at the Crossing =

- Film poster
- Directed by: Alain Levent
- Written by: François Boyer; Philippe Dumarçay; Alain Levent
- Produced by: Gérard Beytout
- Starring: Jacques Brel
- Cinematography: Emmanuel Machuel
- Edited by: Pierre Gillette
- Music by: Jacques Brel; Gérard Jouannest; François Rauber
- Distributed by: SNC
- Release date: 23 August 1972
- Running time: 88 minutes
- Country: France
- Language: French

The Bar at the Crossing (French: Le bar de la fourche) is a 1972 French adventure film directed by Alain Levent. It was entered into the 22nd Berlin International Film Festival. It stars Belgian singer Jacques Brel.

== Plot ==
Vincent Van Horst (Jacques Brel) is a hard-drinking bon viveur who loves his freedom and his women. In 1916, he leaves Europe, which is torn apart by the war, and moves to Canada, intending to meet up with Maria, the only woman he ever loved. On the way to Canada, he meets a young boy who dreams about fighting in the European war. When Vincent arrives at the Bar de la fourche, managed by Maria, he finds her looking older. He finds consolation in another woman, Annie, who looks down on him and drives Vincent and Olivier to fight a duel against each other.

== Cast ==
- Jacques Brel as Vincent van Horst
- Rosy Varte as Maria
- Pierre-François Pistorio as Olivier
- Isabelle Huppert as Annie
- Malka Ribowska as Jane Holly
- Bernard La Jarrige as Nicky Holly
- Gabriel Jabbour as Mosé
- Gérard Victor as Robinson
- Guy Parigot as Le juge
- Robert Angebaud as Le patron
- Luc Hinterseber as Jimmy
- Claude Baret as John Mc Brown
- Gérard Darmon as Le valet
- Diane Kurys as Christie
- Marcel Ory as Le patron de l'hôtel
- Jean-Claude Bouillaud as Carletti
- Andrée Champeaux as La patronne de la maison close

== See also ==
- Isabelle Huppert on screen and stage
