= Sonia Petrovna =

French dancer and actress (born 1952)

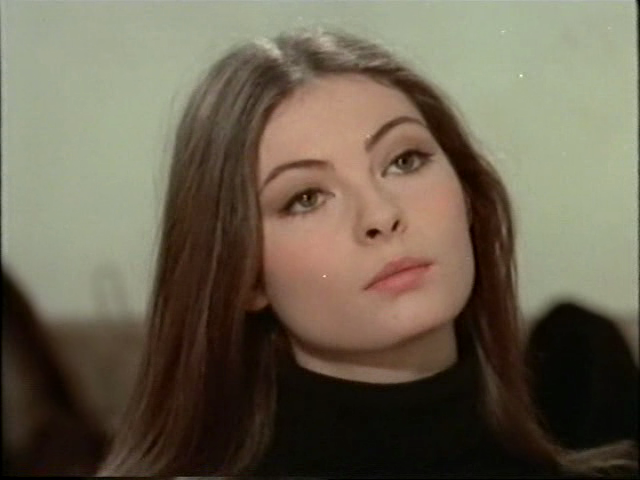
- Sonia Petrovna in Indian Summer
- Born: Sonia Martine Peté; 13 January 1952 (age 74); Paris, France
- Occupations: dancer, actress
- Spouse: Laurent Petitgirard (m. 2000)
- Awards: Chevalier de l'Ordre des Arts et des Lettres
- Website: www.sonia-petrovna.com

Sonia Petrovna (name also credited as Petrova and Petrowa) (born 13 January 1952) is a French dancer, of Russian descent. She is an actress (film, television and theatre) and theatre director. Petrovna was born in Paris. Between the age of 6 and 14 she studied dance at the Paris Opera Ballet (Ballet de l'Opéra de Paris) and on the initial invitation of Roland Petit went on to appear in various ballet productions. Her most famous early acting roles were those of Vanina Abati in Indian Summer, acting alongside leading French actor Alain Delon, and as Princess Sophie in Ludwig alongside leading actors Helmut Berger, John Moulder Brown and Romy Schneider, both in 1972.

== Selected filmography ==
- Adolescence (1966)
- Le feu sacré (1971)
- Indian Summer (1972)
- Ludwig (1972)
- Di mamma non ce n'è una sola (1974)
- Amore (1974)
- Un hombre como los demás (1974)
- D'Annunzio (1985)
- Les nouveaux tricheurs (1987)
- La posta in gioco (1988)
- Da domani (1989)
- Obbligo di giocare - Zugzwang (1989)
- Innocence (II) (2004)

== Television ==
France and Italy:

- The Legendary Life of Ernest Hemingway (1988)
- Le prime foglie d'autunno (1988)
- La casa del sortilegio (1989)
- Due madri (1990)
- The Fatal Image (Meurtre en video) (1990)
- Le Signe du Pouvoir (1992)
- Il segno del comando (1992)
- Boulevard ossements (1993)
- "La crim'" Le sang d'une étoile (2001)
- Sous le soleil (2007)

United States:

- Search for Tomorrow (09/1979 - 09/1980)
- The Edge of Night (09/1980 - 10/1981)
- The Greatest American Hero (series)
- Tucker's Witch (series)
