= The Old Maid (1972 film) =

1972 film

- Film poster
- Directed by: Jean-Pierre Blanc
- Written by: Jean-Pierre Blanc
- Produced by: Raymond Danon
- Starring: Annie Girardot
- Cinematography: Pierre Lhomme
- Edited by: Hélène Plemiannikov
- Music by: Michel Legrand
- Release date: 12 January 1972
- Running time: 85 minutes
- Countries: France; Italy
- Language: French

The Old Maid (French: La Vieille Fille) is a 1972 French comedy film directed by Jean-Pierre Blanc. It was entered into the 22nd Berlin International Film Festival where Blanc won the Silver Bear for Best Director.

== Plot ==
Muriel (Annie Girardot) is a shy woman who bluffs and blusters around in order to hide her shyness and to protect her loneliness, even though she longs wistfully for a companion of some sort. She has been lonely so long that now she is an old maid and has never been wooed. But Muriel finally gets a glimpse of romance when Gabriel (Philippe Noiret) walks into the seaside hotel she is vacationing in. His car has broken down, and he has to stay there for a few days while it is repaired. Hers is the only dinner table with room at it, and Gabriel cannot prevent himself from charming women. She is stiff with him at first, but soon they develop a friendship.

== Cast ==
- Annie Girardot – Muriel Bouchon
- Philippe Noiret – Gabriel Marcassus
- Marthe Keller – Vicka
- Édith Scob – Edith, Monod's wife
- Catherine Samie – Clotilde
- Maria Schneider – Mome
- Lorenza Guerrieri – Punaisa
- Albert Simono – Daniel (as Simono)
- Claudine Assera – La servante
- Jean-Pierre Darras – Sacha
- Michael Lonsdale – Monod (as Michel Lonsdale)

== Reception ==
After being projected the film, distributors refused to release it despite the combined star power of its two leads, Annie Girardot and Philippe Noiret. However, it was finally released as a filler after the commercial failure of François Truffaut's Two English Girls. Against all odds, "The Old Maid" became a critical and commercial success, spending ten weeks in France's box office top ten.

As a first time director, Jean Pierre Blanc's performance was highlighted by the press who praised the elements of social satire of the film, as well as the duo Annie Girardot and Philippe Noiret which was later reunited several times throughout the 1970s in such successful comedies as "La Mandarine" (which was released two weeks after "The Old Maid"), "Dear Detective", or Jupiter's Thigh.
