= Indian Summer (1972 film) =

Film by Valerio Zurlini

- Theatrical release poster
- Italian: La prima notte di quiete
- Directed by: Valerio Zurlini
- Screenplay by: Valerio Zurlini; Enrico Medioli
- Story by: Valerio Zurlini
- Starring: Alain Delon; Giancarlo Giannini; Sonia Petrovna; Renato Salvatori; Alida Valli; Adalberto Maria Merli; Salvo Randone; Lea Massari
- Cinematography: Dario Di Palma
- Edited by: Mario Morra
- Music by: Mario Nascimbene
- Production companies: Mondial Te-Fi; Adel Productions
- Distributed by: Titanus (Italy); Valoria Films (France)
- Release dates: 18 October 1972 (France); 23 October 1972 (Italy)
- Running time: 131 minutes
- Countries: Italy; France
- Language: Italian
- Box office: 1,094,300 admissions (Italy)

Indian Summer (Italian: La prima notte di quiete, lit. 'The First Night of Quiet') is a 1972 psychological romantic drama film co-written and directed by Valerio Zurlini and starring Alain Delon, Sonia Petrovna, Renato Salvatori, Alida Valli, Adalberto Maria Merli, Salvo Randone and Lea Massari. The version released in France and West Germany runs less than the Italian cut.

The film tells the story of a gifted but restless young man who cannot live up to the high traditions of his family and survives in obscurity, taking casual teaching jobs and living in a loveless partnership with a depressed woman. His aimless existence reaches a turning point when he falls for one of his students, a beautiful yet badly damaged girl, a sunny interval in his life like an Indian summer.

Despite receiving positive reviews from critics, the film was a commercial failure.

== Plot ==
Daniele Dominici is hired as a substitute teacher at a liceo classico in Rimini despite an employment history with unexplained gaps. During his first class, he assigns the students to write an essay on a free topic or, if they prefer, one on writer Manzoni. To his surprise, only one student chooses the latter, the quiet and attractive Vanina, who increasingly absorbs his attention. He begins to court her and gives her the book Vanina Vanini by Stendhal.

Daniele lives with his partner Monica, with whom he has a strained relationship. In his free time, he becomes acquainted with a group of men who partake in alcohol, drugs and gambling in a local bar. The group includes Gerardo, a crooked businessman who drives an ostentatious Lamborghini and is Vanina's lover; Spider, a gay pharmacist who is secretly a devout Catholic and lover of poetry; and Marcello, a real estate agent.

After school, Daniele takes the withdrawn Vanina to Monterchi to see the painting Madonna del Parto by Piero della Francesca, and on the way back, they kiss. Their encounter is abruptly interrupted when Vanina spots Gerardo's car in the distance and quickly leaves. On the evening of Spider's birthday, after going to a disco where Vanina sulks and refuses to dance with Daniele, the group end up at Gerardo's luxurious house. There, he shows a home movie, which starts innocently with Vanina on a trip to Venice before showing her naked, lying in bed in a hotel room. Upset, she switches off the projector, and the guests leave.

The next day, Vanina does not turn up at school and Daniele goes to the house of her mother, who warns him to stay away from her daughter. Returning home, he is subjected to a fit of jealousy from Monica, who tolerates his evenings out with other men but not his growing obsession over his student. Meanwhile, Spider has fallen in love with Daniele and has found a book of poems he wrote called The First Night of Stillness, dedicated to a teenage love of his who committed suicide. When Spider asks the meaning of the title, Daniele says it is taken from a poem by Goethe: the first night of quiet is death, because one finally sleeps without dreams.

One night, Vanina reappears, and Daniele meets her in an empty house by the sea that Marcello offers them. After spending a night of passion together, Daniele and Vanina are woken the next morning by a furious Gerardo, who has been looking for his runaway lover. Vanina declares that she does not love Gerardo, who in turn reveals to Daniele that Vanina was a child prostitute, managed by her mother, who has been enjoyed by most men in town and some women too. Daniele then gets the better of Gerardo in a fight and he leaves.

Daniele puts Vanina on a train to stay with her sister in Monterchi, promising to meet her later. He goes home to tell Monica he is leaving her, to which she replies that she will kill herself. On his way to join Vanina, he stops at a bar to ring Monica, but she does not answer the phone, and as he leaves, he is beaten up by the lover of Vanina's mother. Rescued by Marcello, he is looked after by Spider. Injured and upset, he drives fast and erratically through the fog. Again getting no response from Monica's telephone, he decides to return to her but is hit by a truck and killed. In the private chapel of Daniele's family's country mansion, Spider is the only one of his friends to attend his funeral. There, he discovers that Daniele was the only child of a war hero who was killed at El Alamein.

== Cast ==
- Alain Delon as Daniele Dominici
- Giancarlo Giannini as Spider
- Sonia Petrovna as Vanina Abati
- Renato Salvatori as Marcello
- Alida Valli as Vanina's mother
- Adalberto Maria Merli as Gerardo Pavani
- Nicoletta Rizzi as Elvira
- Salvo Randone as the headmaster
- Lea Massari as Monica
- Fabrizio Moroni as Fabrizio Romani, a student
- Patrizia Adiutori as Valeria
- Sandro Moretti as Leo Montanari
- Carla Mancini as a female student
- Liana Del Balzo as Daniele's mother (uncredited)
- Krista Nell as Martine (uncredited)

== Production ==
Delon and the director clashed during filmmaking.

== Box office ==
Indian Summer was a mild success in France, but was the seventh most popular film of the year in Italy. The film's box-office disappointment is now attributed to the dwindling interest in Delon's changing public persona. Delon was cast against type as the unkempt looking teacher. He was also entering early middle age around the time of the film's release when his "star image and brand recognition were dependent on the constant reiteration of his more glamorous, youthful self."

== See also ==
- List of Italian films of 1972
