= Jean-Pierre Blanc =

French film director and screenwriter

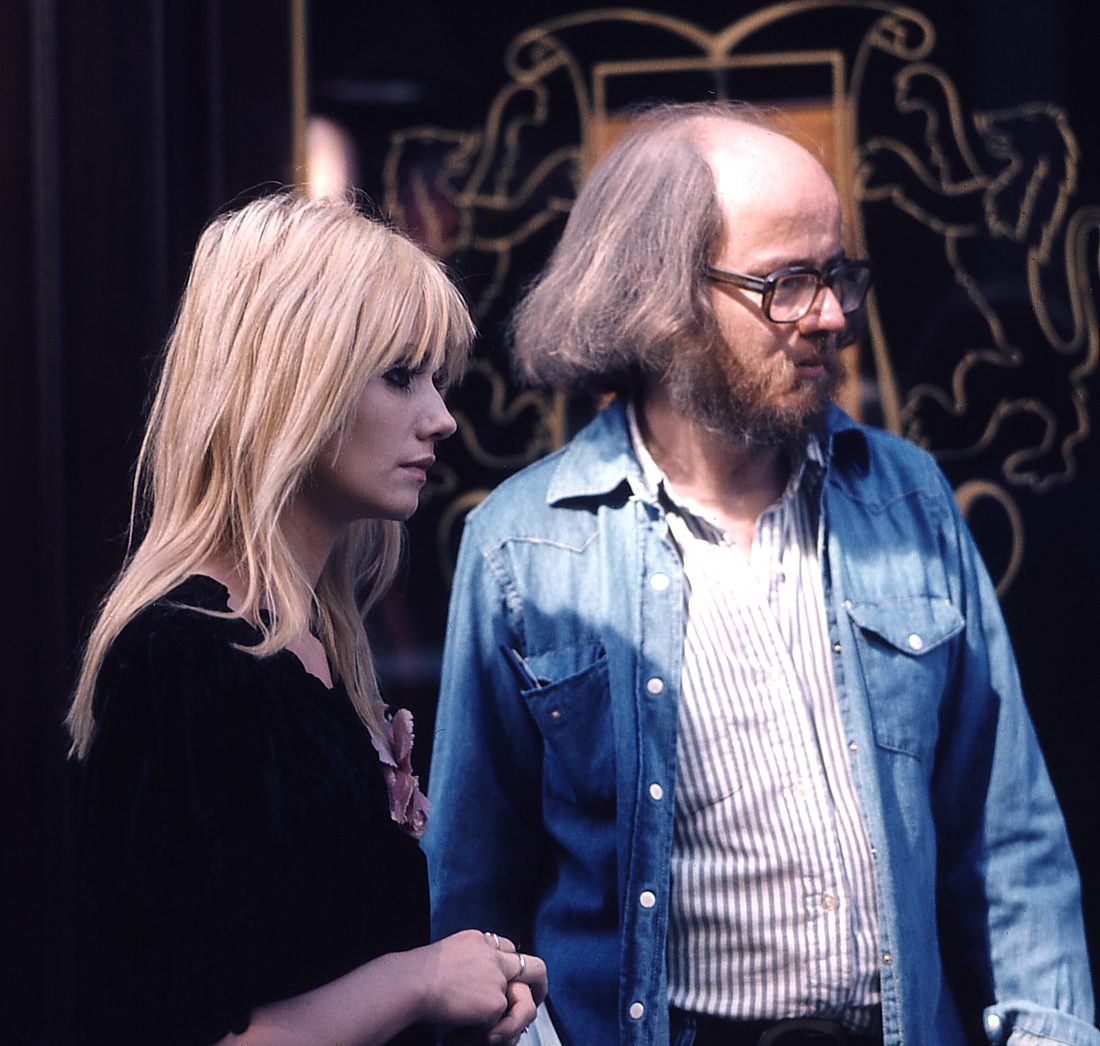
- Born: 23 April 1942; Charenton-le-Pont, France
- Died: 21 May 2004 (aged 62); Saint-Cloud, France
- Occupations: Film director, screenwriter
- Years active: 1972–1993

Jean-Pierre Blanc (23 April 1942 – 21 May 2004) was a French film director and screenwriter. He directed six films between 1972 and 1993. He won the Silver Bear for Best Director at the 22nd Berlin International Film Festival for La Vieille Fille.

== Filmography ==
- La Vieille Fille (1972)
- Un ange au paradis (1973)
- D'amour et d'eau fraîche (1976)
- Le devoir de français (1978)
- L'Esprit de famille (film) (1979)
- Caravane (1993)
