= Claude Jaeger =

French film producer and film actor (1917–2004)

Claude Jaeger (April 2, 1917 – September 16, 2004) was a Swiss-born French film producer and actor.

== Life and career ==
Claude Jaeger was born on April 2, 1917, in Geneva, Switzerland, where he attended the International School of Geneva. He later pursued his studies in Paris and briefly worked at the Ministry of Finance, but was interrupted by World War II and he served in the French Army. After the 1940 armistice with Nazi Germany, he joined the Communist Party of Spain (PCE) at the suggestion of Manuel Azcárate, a Spanish communist in exile in France after the Republican defeat in the Spanish Civil War. After the collapse of the Nazi-Soviet alliance, Germans began rounding up the exiled Spaniards in France in 1941. Jaeger and other communists sought refuge in the Zone libre (free zone) in the southern section of Vichy France in 1942. He also began to discover his interest in the film industry and worked as an assistant director. In the Zone Libre, Jaeger met Gillo Pontecorvo, an Italian filmmaker and fellow communist, and joined the Italian Communist Party (PCI). By 1943, Jaeger also worked with the information service of the Francs-Tireurs et Partisans (FTP), the communist arm of the French Resistance. His codename / pseudonym was "Michelin" and he was given a rank of colonel, and served in the FTP until the war's end. Jaeger briefly worked under General Jean de Lattre de Tassigny's forces in 1945 after the FTP was merged with the Free French army. Afterward he joined the Office professionnel du cinéma (OPC), the French regulator of cinema, which soon shed its Vichy origin by changing into the modern Centre national du cinéma et de l'image animée (CPC) in 1946. He worked as a production manager there until 1950, when his political leanings saw him dismissed. The French Communist Party (PCF) put Jaeger in charge of Procinex, a corporation that would create short films for left-wing audiences and for the Soviet sphere of influence. As these films were commissioned by a political party, they tended to aim more for the educational, inspirational, and/or propaganda style rather than as pure entertainment.

In the mid-1950s, the PCF decided to slow its monetary support for Procinex. Jaeger obtained the approval of the Party to change Procinex into a more standard production company that would make money-making crowd pleasers. Jaeger would go on to produce many feature films at Procinex over the decades. One of his most notable frequent collaborators was Luis Buñuel, known for his distinctive surrealistic film style. He maintained his Italian contacts throughout his career and several of his productions were joint Franco-Italian projects. Jaeger also acted, although frequently in cameo or other minor roles due to his other duties. His production slowed in the 1980s until his eventual retirement, with his last produced film in 1982, and his last acting role in 1992.

Jaeger died on September 16, 2004, in Paris.

== Filmography ==
Producer

- 1956 : Cela s'appelle l'aurore, Luis Buñuel (This is Called Dawn)
- 1961 : Une aussi longue absence, Henri Colpi (The Long Absence)
- 1962 : La Poupée, Jacques Baratier (The Doll)
- 1962 : Le Diable et les Dix Commandements, Julien Duvivier (The Devil and the Ten Commandments)
- 1964 : Une souris chez les hommes, Jacques Poitrenaud (A Mouse with the Men)
- 1964 : La Chasse à l'homme, Édouard Molinaro (Man Hunting)
- 1966 : La Voleuse, Jean Chapot (The Thief)
- 1967 : Le Mur, Serge Roullet (The Wall)
- 1974 : La Femme aux bottes rouges, Juan Luis Buñuel (The Woman with Red Boots)
- 1982 : T'es folle ou quoi?, Michel Gérard (Are you crazy or what?)

Actor

- 1961 : Un nommé La Rocca, Jean Becker : Fernand (A Man Named Rocca)
- 1964 : Le Journal d'une femme de chambre, Luis Buñuel : The judge (Diary of a Chambermaid)
- 1971 : La Ville bidon, Jacques Baratier : The promoter
- 1972 : Le Charme discret de la bourgeoisie, Luis Buñuel (The Discreet Charm of the Bourgeoisie)
- 1977 : Cet obscur objet du désir, Luis Buñuel : Bar owner (That Obscure Object of Desire)
- 1978 : Perceval le Gallois, Éric Rohmer : Thiebaut of Tintaguel
- 1986 : Max mon amour, Nagisa Oshima : Zoologist (Max, My Love)
- 1992 : Nous deux, Henri Graziani : Tancrède (Us two)

Director

- 1967 : Le Rouge et le Bleu (short film) (The Red and the Blue)
