= Joyce Buñuel =

French film director and screenwriter

- Born: Joyce Sherman; October 20, 1941 (age 85); Brooklyn, New York, U.S.
- Occupations: Film director; screenwriter
- Spouse: Juan Luis Buñuel (div. 1976)
- Children: Diego Buñuel

Joyce Sherman Buñuel (née Sherman; born October 20, 1941) is a French-American film director and screenwriter.

== Biography ==
Joyce Sherman was born on October 20, 1941, in Brooklyn, New York, to a Russian-Jewish family who fled the Russian Empire in 1914. In an interview with Le Monde in 1990, she humorously stated that her childhood upbringing was "exactly" like the Woody Allen film Radio Days. Her father, a Menshevik, fought in the International Brigades during the Spanish Civil War.

Buñuel was married to director Juan Luis Buñuel, the son of Luis Buñuel. The couple lived in Madrid and Mexico City, before moving to Paris in the early 1960s. The couple divorced after she made her first film, La Jument vapeur, in 1976. She had several children from this marriage, including Diego Buñuel.

== Filmography ==
=== Films ===
- 1978: La Jument vapeur
- 2000: Salsa
- 2002: Single Again

=== Television ===
- 1979: Les Héritiers (television series), episode Juste la Seine à traverser
- 1984: Aéroport : Issue de secours (television film)
- 1986: La Dame des dunes (television film)
- 1987: La Tricheuse (television film)
- 1989: Une femme tranquille (television film)
- 1990: Haute Tension (television series), episode Les Amants du lac
- 1991: Le Dernier lien (television film)
- 1992: Nestor Burma (television series), episode Le soleil naît derrière le Louvre
- 1993: Dose mortelle (television film)
- 1994: Maigret (television series), episode Maigret se trompe
- 1995: Terrain glissant (television film)
- 1995: Julie Lescaut (television series), episode Recours en grâce
- 1996: Sans mentir (television film)
- 1997: Madame le Consul (television series), episodes Les Disparus de la Sierra Madre et Le Bûcher des innocentes
- 1998: La Dernière des romantiques (television film)
- 1999: Mar Elliot (television film)
- 2001: Roger et Fred (television film)
- 2001: La Juge Beaulieu (television film)
- 2003: Le Voyage de la grande-duchesse (television film)
- 2003: Commissaire Moulin (television series), episode Série noire
- 2004: Sœur Thérèse.com (television series), episodes Retour de flammes and Jardin secret
- 2005: Dalida (television film)
- 2006: Capitaine Casta : Amélie a disparu (television film)
- 2005 to 2007: Le juge est une femme (television series), 4 episodes :
  - Mince à mourir (2005)
  - La Loi du marché (2006)
  - Des goûts et des couleurs (2006)
  - Mauvaise Rencontre (2007)
- 2007: Sœur Thérèse.com (television series), episode L'assassin est parmi nous
- 2008: De feu et de glace (television film)
- 2008: Marie et Madeleine (television film)
- 2009: Le Temps est à l'orage (television film)
- 2010 to 2015: Clem (television series), 17 episodes:
  - Maman trop tôt (pilote) (2010)
  - C'est la rentrée ! (2011)
  - Vive les vacances! (2011)
  - Bienvenue à Valentin (2011)
  - La Guerre des familles (2012)
  - La Mutation (2012)
  - La famille c'est sacré! (2012)
  - Haut les cœurs ! (2013)
  - Maman a craqué (2013)
  - Un de plus chez les Boissier(2013)
  - Ma femme, sa sœur et moi (2014)
  - Rendez-moi ma fille (2014)
  - Ca y est, je marie ma fille ! (2015)
  - C'est pas gagné! (2015)
  - Jamais sans mes filles ! (2015)
  - Comment lui dire adieu ? (2015)
  - Quand maman dit non ! (2015)
- 2010: M comme Mensonges (television film)
- 2014: On se retrouvera (television film)
