= Luis Buñuel filmography =

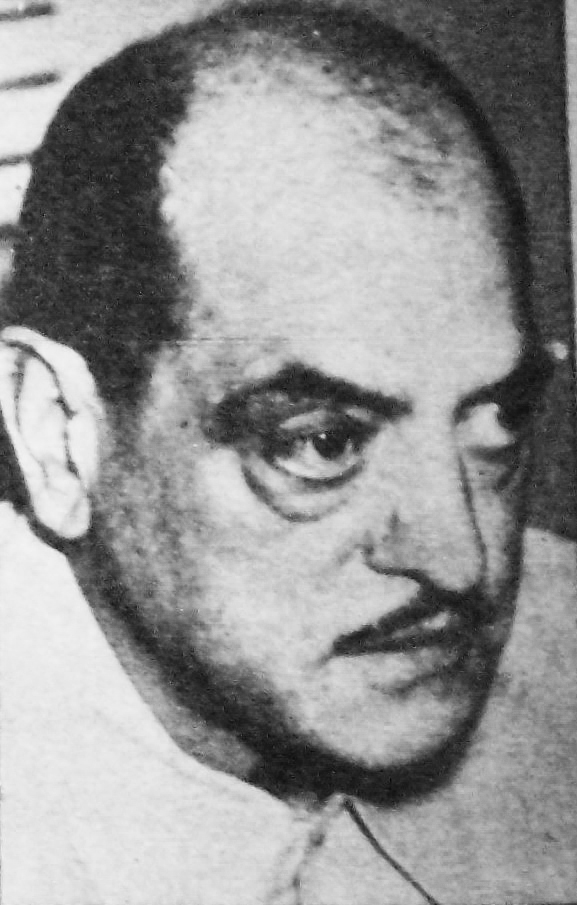
Buñuel in 1968

This is a list of the films directed by Luis Buñuel.

== Film ==
=== Features ===
Year	Original title	English title	Director	Writer	Notes	Language
1928	La chute de la maison Usher	The Fall of the House of Usher	No	Yes	Also assistant director	French
1930	L'Âge d'Or	The Golden Age	Yes	Yes	Also editor and composer	French
1947	Gran Casino	Magnificent Casino	Yes	No		Spanish
1949	El gran calavera	The Great Madcap	Yes	No		Spanish
1950	Los olvidados	The Forgotten (aka The Young and the Damned)	Yes	Yes	Also uncredited editor	Spanish
1951	Sí tú no puedes, yo sí	If you can't, I can	No	Story		Spanish
1951	Susana	Susana (aka The Devil and the Flesh)	Yes	Yes	Also uncredited editor	Spanish
1951	La hija del engaño	The Daughter of Deceit	Yes	Yes		Spanish
1952	Subida al cielo	Ascent to Heaven (aka Mexican Bus Ride)	Yes	Yes		Spanish
1952	Una mujer sin amor	A Woman Without Love	Yes	Yes		Spanish
1953	El bruto	The Brute	Yes	Yes		Spanish
1953	Él	This Strange Passion (aka Tourments)	Yes	Yes		Spanish
1954	La ilusión viaja en tranvía	Illusion Travels by Streetcar	Yes	No	Also uncredited editor	Spanish
1954	Abismos de pasión	Wuthering Heights	Yes	Yes		Spanish
1954	Robinson Crusoe		Yes	Yes		English
1954	El río y la muerte	The River and Death	Yes	Yes		Spanish
1955	Ensayo de un crimen	Rehearsal for a Crime (aka The Criminal Life of Archibaldo de la Cruz)	Yes	Yes		Spanish
1956	Cela s'appelle l'aurore	That Is the Dawn	Yes	Yes		French
1956	La mort en ce jardin	Death in the Garden (aka The Diamond Hunters)	Yes	Yes	Also uncredited editor	French
1959	Nazarín		Yes	Yes		Spanish
1959	La fièvre monte à El Pao	Fever Rises in El Pao (aka Republic of Sin)	Yes	Yes		French
1960	La joven	The Young One	Yes	Yes		English
1961	Viridiana		Yes	Yes		Spanish
1962	El ángel exterminador	The Exterminating Angel	Yes	Yes		Spanish
1964	Le journal d'une femme de chambre	Diary of a Chambermaid	Yes	Yes	Also uncredited editor	French
1967	Belle de jour	Beauty of Day	Yes	Yes		French
1969	La voie lactée	The Milky Way	Yes	Yes	Also composer	French
1970	Tristana		Yes	Yes	Also producer	Spanish
1971	Johnny Got His Gun		No	Uncredited		English
1972	Il Monaco	The Monk	No	Yes		French
1972	Le charme discret de la bourgeoisie	The Discreet Charm of the Bourgeoisie	Yes	Yes	Also sound effects	French
1974	Le fantôme de la liberté	The Phantom of Liberty	Yes	Yes	Also sound effects	French
1977	Cet obscur objet du désir	That Obscure Object of Desire	Yes	Yes	Final film	French
1997	La novía de medianoche	The Midnight Bride	No	Yes (Note: Original screenplay co-written with José Rubia Barcia with an uncredited adaptation by Antonio Simón & Lino Braxe.)	Produced and released posthumously	Spanish

=== Shorts ===
Year	Original title	English title	Director	Writer	Producer	Editor	Notes	Language
1929	Un Chien Andalou	An Andalusian Dog	Yes	Yes	Yes	Yes	Short film	French
1930	Menjant Garotes	Eating Sea Urchins	Yes	No	Yes	Yes	Documentary short film 3' 43"	Silent Film
1933	Las Hurdes: Tierra Sin Pan	Land Without Bread	Yes	Yes	Yes	Yes	Documentary medium length film	French
1937	España, 1936	Spain, 1936	No	Yes	Yes	No	Propaganda film for the Spanish Second Republic; Also montage supervisor	Spanish
1940	The Vatican Pio XII		Yes	No	No	No	Documentary part of the short film series The March of Time	English
1965	Simón del Desierto	Simon of the Desert	Yes	Yes	No	No	Medium length Film	Spanish, Latin

=== Assistance and supervision ===
Year	Original title	English title	Work	Language
1926	Mauprat		Production assistant	French
1926	Carmen		Second second assistant director	French
1927	La Siréne des tropiques	Siren of Tropics	Assistant director	France
1935	Don Quintin, El Amargao	Don Quintín, the Bitter	Producer and Supervisor (Note: Buñuel founded during the Second Spanish Republic, the film company "Filmofono" where there were made films that appeal to a mainstream and popular audience and were completely different than his previous art films that he was known fo. Despite remaining uncredited, he supervised and was heavily involved in most of the production aspects (that includes directing, screenplay, production and editing).)	Spanish
1935	La hija de Juan Simón	Juan Simon's Daughter	Producer and Supervisor	Spanish
1936	¿Quien me quiere a mi?	Who Does Love Me?	Producer and Supervisor	Spanish
1937	¡Centinela, Alerta!	Sentry, Keep Watch!	Producer and Supervisor	Spanish

== Awards ==
=== 1950s ===
Los Olvidados

- Cannes Film Festival – Best Director
- Ariel Award – Golden Ariel
- Ariel Award - Silver Ariel – Mejor Dirección
- Ariel Award - Silver Ariel – Mejor Adaptación (with Luis Alcoriza)
- Ariel Award - Silver Ariel – Mejor Argumento Original (with Luis Alcoriza)

Mexican Bus Ride

- Cannes Film Festival – Official Selection
- Ariel Award nominee – Golden Ariel
- Ariel Award nominee - Silver Ariel – Mejor Dirección

Robinson Crusoe

- Ariel Award – Golden Ariel
- Ariel Award -Silver Ariel – Mejor Dirección
- Ariel Award -Silver Ariel – Mejor Adaptación
- Oscar nominee – Best Actor (Dan O'Herlihy)

Rehearsal for a Crime (aka The Criminal Life of Archibaldo de la Cruz)

- Ariel Award nominee – Golden Ariel
- Ariel Award nominee - Silver Ariel – Mejor Dirección
- Ariel Award nominee - Silver Ariel – Mejor Adaptación (with Eduardo Ugarte)

Nazarín

- Cannes Film Festival – International Prize
- Bodil Award – Best Non-European Film (Bedste ikke-europæiske film)

=== 1960s ===
The Young One

- Cannes Film Festival – Special Mention

Viridiana

- Cannes Film Festival – Palme d'Or

The Exterminating Angel

- Cannes Film Festival – FIPRESCI Prize
- Bodil Award – Best Non-European Film (Bedste ikke-europæiske film)

Diary of a Chambermaid

- Italian National Syndicate of Film Journalists – Nastro d'Argento nominee for Best Foreign Director
- Karlovy Vary International Film Festival – Best Actress (Jeanne Moreau)

Simon of the Desert

- Venice Film Festival Grand Jury Prize

Belle de Jour

- Venice Film Festival – Golden Lion
- Venice Film Festival – Pasinetti Award
- Bodil Award – Best European Film (Bedste europæiske film)
- French Syndicate of Cinema Critics Award – Best Film
- New York Film Critics Circle Awards – Third place – Best Foreign Language Film
- French Syndicate of Cinema Critics – Prix Méliès
- BAFTA Award nominee for Best Actress (Catherine Deneuve)

The Milky Way

- Berlin International Film Festival – Interfilm Award
- Italian National Syndicate of Film Journalists – Nastro d'Argento nominee for Best Foreign Director

=== 1970s ===
Tristana

- Oscar Nominee – Best Foreign Language Film
- Cinema Writers Circle Award – Mejor Director
- National Society of Film Critics Award nominee – Best Director
- Sant Jordi Award – Best Film (Mejor Película Española)
- Fotogramas de Plata – Best Spanish Movie Performer (Fernando Rey)
- Fotogramas de Plata nominee – Best Spanish Movie Performer (Lola Gaos)

The Discreet Charm of the Bourgeoisie

- Oscar Winner – Best Foreign Language Film
- Oscar Nominee – Best Original Screenplay
- BAFTA Film Award – Best Screenplay (with Jean-Claude Carrière)
- BAFTA Film Award nominee – Best Direction
- BAFTA Film Award nominee – Best Soundtrack (with Guy Villette)
- French Syndicate of Cinema Critics – Prix Méliès
- Golden Globe Award nominee – Best Foreign-Language Foreign Film
- Italian National Syndicate of Film Journalists – Nastro d'Argento nominee for Best Foreign Director
- National Society of Film Critics Award – Best Director
- National Society of Film Critics Award nominee – Best Screenplay (with Jean-Claude Carrière)
- New York Film Critics Circle Award nominee – Best Director
- New York Film Critics Circle Award nominee – Best Screenplay (with Jean-Claude Carrière)

The Phantom of Liberty

- Italian National Syndicate of Film Journalists – Nastro d'Argento for Best Foreign Director
- National Board of Review – Top Foreign Films

That Obscure Object of Desire

- Oscar Nominee – Best Foreign Language Film
- Oscar Nominee – Best Adapted Screenplay
- Cinema Writers Circle Award – Mejor Director
- César Award nominee for Best Director
- César Award nominee for Best Screenplay, Dialogue or Adaptation (with Jean-Claude Carrière)
- Golden Globe Award nominee – Best Foreign-Language Foreign Film
- Los Angeles Film Critics Association Award – Best Foreign Language Film
- National Board of Review Award – Best Director
- National Society of Film Critics Award – Best Director
- New York Film Critics Circle Award nominee – Best Director
