= Au rendez-vous de la mort joyeuse =

- Directed by: Juan Luis Buñuel
- Written by: Juan Luis Buñuel, Pierre-Jean Maintigneux
- Produced by: Robert Velin
- Cinematography: Ghislain Cloquet
- Edited by: Geneviève Vaury
- Release date: 1973
- Running time: 90 min
- Countries: France; Italy
- Language: French
- Box office: $573,810

Au rendez-vous de la mort joyeuse is a 1973 French-Italian horror film directed by Juan Luis Buñuel (the son of Luis Buñuel). It is also known as At the Meeting with Joyous Death (International English title) and Expulsion of the Devil (USA) and Lune lune coquelune.

== Plot ==
A married couple purchases an abandoned house in the countryside. Soon they witness strange apparitions and events. Their son and moreover their daughter are haunted by a poltergeist.

== Cast ==
- Françoise Fabian : Françoise
- Jean-Marc Bory : Marc
- Jean-Pierre Darras : Peron
- Claude Dauphin : Father D'Aval
- Michel Creton : Leroy
- Gérard Depardieu : Beretti
- Renato Salvatori : Henri
- André Weber : Kleber
- Yasmine Dahm : Sophie
