= The Burned Barns =

- Directed by: Jean Chapot
- Written by: Jean Chapot; Sébastien Roulet
- Produced by: Raymond Danon; Ralph Baum
- Starring: Simone Signoret; Alain Delon
- Cinematography: Sacha Vierny
- Edited by: Hélène Plemiannikov
- Music by: Jean Michel Jarre
- Distributed by: Fox-Lira
- Release date: 30 May 1973
- Running time: 95 minutes
- Country: France
- Language: French
- Box office: 991,624 admissions (France)

The Burned Barns (French: Les Granges brûlées) is a 1973 French drama film directed by Jean Chapot. The film score was composed by Jean Michel Jarre and released as album in 1973. In 2003, the soundtrack album was reissued on CD by Disques Dreyfus. The album has been reissued again in 2023 on vinyl and digital formats from Transversales on Bandcamp.

== Cast ==
- Simone Signoret - Rose Cateux
- Alain Delon - Pierre Larcher
- Paul Crauchet - Pierre Cateux
- Bernard Le Coq - Paul Cateux
- Pierre Rousseau - Louis Cateux
- Catherine Allégret - Françoise Cateux
- Miou-Miou - Monique Cateux
- Béatrice Costantini - Lucile Cateux
- Jean Bouise - Reporter
- Renato Salvatori - hôtelier

== Production ==
The film was shot in Pontarlier, in the Doubs department.
