= La Voleuse =

- Directed by: Jean Chapot
- Screenplay by: Jean Chapot; Marguerite Duras
- Produced by: Claude Jaeger; Hans Oppenheimer
- Starring: Romy Schneider; Michel Piccoli; Hans-Christian Blech
- Cinematography: Jean Penzer
- Edited by: Ginette Boudet
- Music by: Antoine Duhamel
- Production companies: Union Générale Cinématographique; La Société des Films Sirius; Hans Oppenheimer Film; Chronos Films; Procinex
- Distributed by: Compagnie Française de Distribution Cinématographique
- Release date: 18 November 1966
- Running time: 88 minutes
- Countries: France; West Germany
- Language: French

La Voleuse, meaning 'the thief', is a 1966 French drama film directed by Jean Chapot, with a screenplay by Marguerite Duras. In German, the film was titled Schornstein Nr. 4 ("Chimney No. 4").

Set in Germany, it tells the story of a childless couple where the wife (Romy Schneider) steals back a little boy she gave away in her teens and the husband (Michel Piccoli) gradually persuades her that the childless couple who lovingly raised the child have the better claim.

== Plot ==
Werner and Julia, a childless middle-class couple in Berlin, face a crisis. Unable to conceive, Julia wants to reclaim a child she gave away at birth when she was single in her teens. The little boy is now six and lives happily in Essen with a childless working-class couple, a Polish immigrant called Radek and his wife. Despite Werner's efforts to dissuade her, she starts stalking the child. As there was no formal adoption, she feels she has a legal as well as a moral right to the boy and one day at the swimming pool she abducts him.

Tracing his beloved little boy to Berlin, Radek bursts into the flat and seizes him back. Werner gets Radek arrested at the railway station and regains possession of the lad. It rapidly becomes apparent that not only is Julia's mental balance precarious but she lacks parenting skills. Radek, inconsolable at his loss, climbs a factory chimney and says he will throw himself off if the child is not returned. The media took up the case, with most of the country on the side of the honest couple who raised the boy and against the selfish mother. Shortly before Radek's deadline, Werner persuades Julia to give the boy back, but it is doubtful what kind of marriage is left for the pair.

== Cast ==
- Romy Schneider – Julia
- Michel Piccoli – Werner
- Hans Christian Blech – Radek
- Sonja Schwarz – Radek's wife
- Mario Huth – The little boy
