= Jeanne Rucar =

French film actress (1908–1994)

Jeanne Rucar (Lille, 29 February 1908 – Mexico City, 4 November 1994) was a French-born Mexican professional actress and gymnast. In 1990, she authored Memoir of a Woman without a Piano. Jeanne Rucar was married to Luis Buñuel for forty-nine years, from 1934 until his death in 1983.
