= Diego Buñuel =

French-American filmmaker

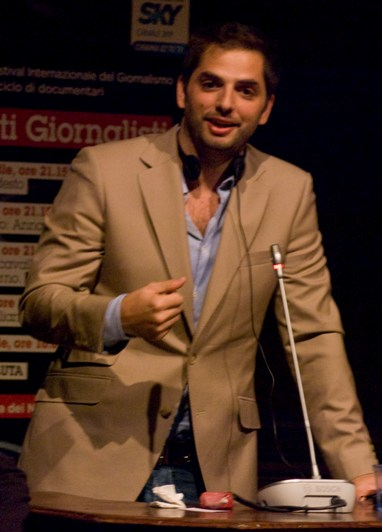
- Born: 21 July 1975 (age 51); Paris, Île-de-France
- Occupations: War correspondent Film director Television presenter Journalist

Diego Buñuel (born 21 July 1975 in Paris) is a French-American filmmaker and the host and director of the National Geographic Channel series Don't Tell My Mother. He is also the host of a television news show in France called Les Nouveaux Explorateurs, broadcast on Canal Plus. In 2014, he was appointed Director of Documentaries and Factual Entertainment at Canal Plus. In 2018, he joined Netflix as Director of Original Documentaries in Europe.

== Biography ==
He is the grandson of Spanish-Mexican film director Luis Buñuel and son of filmmakers Juan Luis Buñuel and Joyce Buñuel (née Sherman) of Russian-Jewish descent. Diego received his bachelor's degree from Northwestern University, majoring in journalism, minoring in political science and then interned for various newspapers such as The Times Picayune in New Orleans, The San Francisco Examiner, the St. Louis Post-Dispatch, the Miami Herald and the Chicago Tribune before going to work for the Sun Sentinel as lead crime reporter.

In 2000, he did his French military service in Bosnia and was stationed in Sarajevo which led him to a specialization in war reporting.War in Bosnia ended in 1995

Back in France, he started working for the press agency CAPA as a war correspondent. He covered 9/11, the 2001 US intervention in Afghanistan, was embedded with the U.S. Marine Corps in 2003 for a month as his unit traveled from Kuwait to Baghdad. After that, he went on to follow the Second Congo War, the 2004 tsunami in Banda Aceh, Indonesia, Yasser Arafat's funeral in Ramallah and did a special report on the rise of evangelical Christians in George Bush's America, among some 50 other news stories.

In 2006, he shot the first episode of the series Don't Tell My Mother, co-produced by Canal+ and the National Geographic Channel, where he offers a new look on rarely traveled areas affected by conflicts and wars such as Afghanistan, Colombia, North Korea, Congo, Venezuela, Palestine, Iran, Iraq, The Balkans (Croatia, Bosnia and Herzegovina, Serbia and Kosovo) and Pakistan.

In 2008, Buñuel created his own production studio named "Buñuel Production" and produced season 2, 3 : Johannesburg-Lagos, Delhi-Dhaka, Beirut- Le Caire, Mexico-São Paulo, Tokyo-Manila, and 4 : Russia, Indonesia, Somalia, Kazakhstan and USA, of his show. He is now producer and director at "Explorer", a company created in conjunction with CAPA. After spending four years travelling to 25 countries, trekking through war zones and mixing it up in the world's mega-cities, Diego Buñuel is now journeying to the far reaches of the planet to discover its forbidden zones. The first episode, Siachen: the battleground on the roof of the world, was completed by the end of 2011.

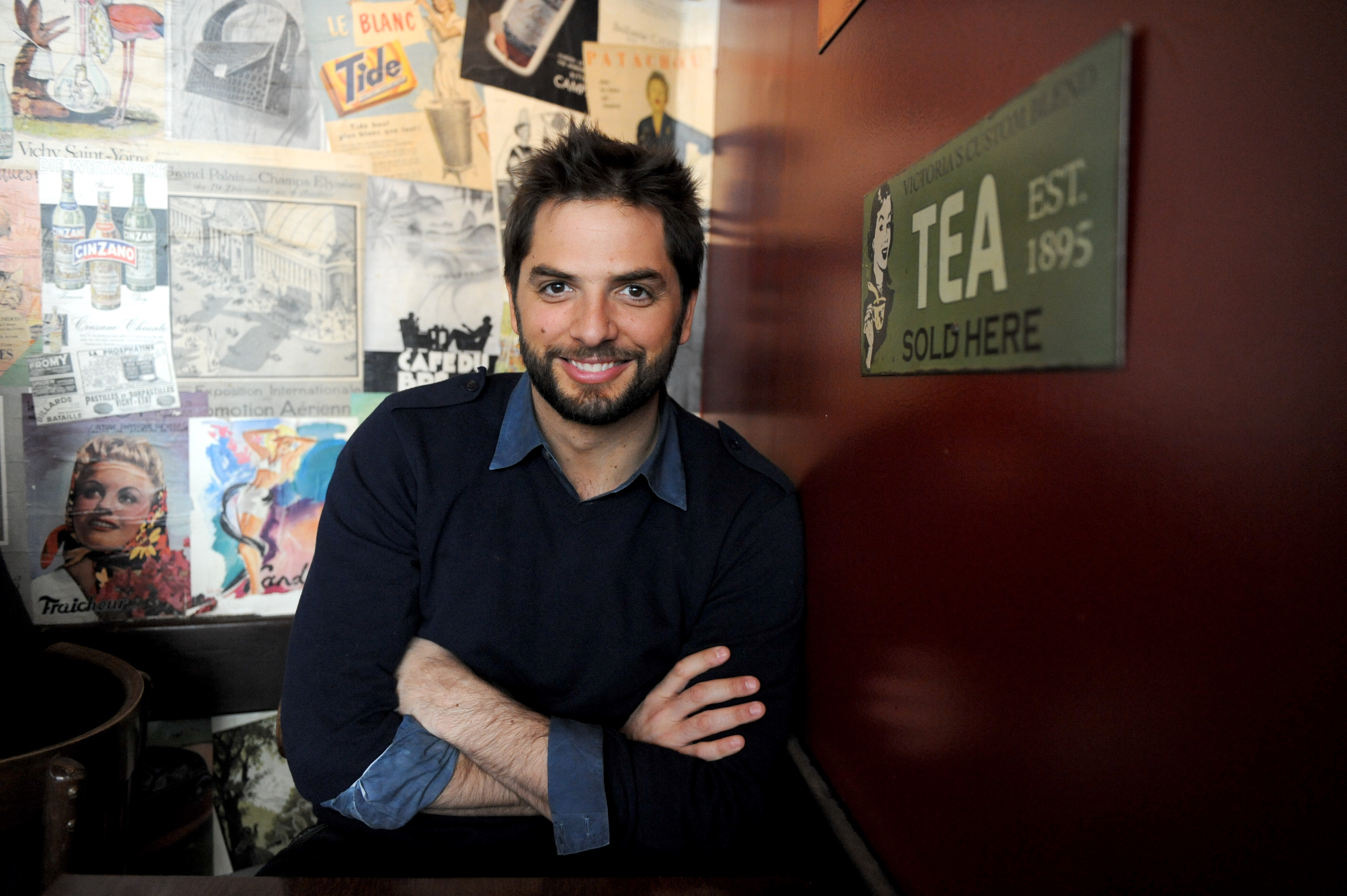
Diego Buñuel in Paris in 2012.

In 2013, he traveled Allahabad to shoot a documentary titled Inside the Maha Kumbh will feature Buñuel's experience of living with the Naga sadhus and learning about the intricacies of the rituals held there. It was broadcast in 68 countries on National Geographic Channel in March 2013. Its reach was widened as it was dubbed in 26 languages.

In 2014, Buñuel was named head of documentaries for Groupe Canal Plus in France. He oversaw the rebranding of all factual content and created 'Creation Documentaire', a feature doc film label. Under that label, docs such as Releve, Terror Studios, Exodus, Teddy Riner, Guerriers de l'Ombre, Scam(s) and many others were selected in Cannes, SXSW, Tribeca and for the International Emmy Awards. Exodus, co-produced with the BBC, won the 2017 International Emmy Award for documentary.

In 2018, Buñuel joins Netflix in Los Angeles as director of Original Documentaries. A few months later, he relocated to head Netflix's documentary office in London.

In 2019, Buñuel left Netflix by "mutual decision," as he wanted to relocate to Paris. Though Netflix was opening a Paris office, Buñuel was required to stay in London. In 2020, Buñuel was tapped as head of programming at France Televisions.

In 2022, Diego Buñuel was named head of développement for France Televisions Studio for Fiction and Docs. The Studio is France's third largest production house and Diego has also gotten back in front of the camera to host two prime time documentary series. First, Thalassa, a famous adventure TV show about the world's oceans, and Instinct Animal, about Africa's wilderness.
