= The Woman in Red Boots =

1974 film by Juan Luis Buñuel

- French theatrical release poster
- French: La Femme aux bottes rouges
- Directed by: Juan Luis Buñuel
- Written by: Pierre-Jean Maintigneux; Jean-Claude Carrière; Clement Wood; Juan Luis Buñuel
- Produced by: Claude Jaeger
- Starring: Catherine Deneuve; Fernando Rey; Adalberto Maria Merli; Jacques Weber; José Sacristán; Emma Cohen; Laura Betti
- Cinematography: Leopoldo Villaseñor
- Edited by: Geneviève Vaury
- Production companies: Gerico Sound; Procinex; ORTF; Serafin Garcia Trueba
- Distributed by: UGC; NEF; CFDC (France); Maxi Cinematografica Italiana (Italy); As Films S.A. (Spain)
- Release dates: 11 December 1974 (France); 12 December 1974 (Italy); 11 March 1975 (Spain)
- Running time: 95 minutes
- Countries: France; Italy; Spain
- Language: French

The Woman in Red Boots (French: La Femme aux bottes rouges, Italian: La ragazza con gli stivali rossi, Spanish: La mujer con botas rojas) is a 1974 fantasy comedy-drama film co-written and directed by Juan Luis Buñuel. The film stars Catherine Deneuve as a beautiful young writer with the power to make her wishes reality whose life becomes entangled with the plots of the wealthy art patron Perrot, played by Fernando Rey.

The film is highly surrealistic and tinged with a metanarrative, with the characters roughly representing divisions of the art world: the raw creative power of young Françoise, the heroine who has nearly unlimited potential; the cynical manipulation and distant intellectualism of the elder Perrot; and the middle-aged Marc (Adalberto Maria Merli), trapped in the middle and forced to choose.

== Plot ==
Françoise Leroy is a young and beautiful novelist, gifted since childhood with the extraordinary ability to make her wishes come true. She is in an open relationship with Richard, a bohemian painter. During a chance meeting with Perrot, a wealthy middle-aged art patron, Françoise uses her psychic powers to briefly expose her naked body underneath her cape to him. The manipulative Perrot begins to stalk Françoise and soon discovers that she writes anonymous letters to Marc Villier, the director of an art magazine, much to the concern of his wife Sophie. Perrot intercepts the letters and, impersonating Marc, writes replies to Françoise.

Françoise anonymously sends Marc invitations to a classical music concert, which he attends with Sophie. At the concert, Françoise secretly approaches Marc, revealing herself as the author of the letters. That night, Perrot takes photos of Françoise while she is asleep and sends them to Sophie. Suspecting that Marc is having an affair, Sophie spies on Marc during a hunting trip and is accidentally shot dead by her husband. Later, Marc visits Françoise and blames her for Sophie's death. Despite saying that he loved Françoise's book, he tells her to leave him alone.

Through his lawyer, Perrot invites Françoise to write her memoir in his country house. The lawyer drives Françoise to the country house, where she has visions of a man slashing his own throat in one of the rooms. During Françoise's stay, Perrot engages her in a three-dimensional chess game. One night, Perrot invites Marc to the house, having hired him as his new literary editor, to meet a writer and discuss the launch of a new novel. Marc is surprised to find that Françoise is the writer in question.

The next day, Richard arrives at the country house at Perrot's invitation. Marc tells Françoise he is leaving, but they end up having sex. When Perrot raises a toast to Marc's deceased wife, Marc accuses Perrot of ordering Françoise to write to him and have sex with him. In a fit of rage, Marc nearly attacks Richard, but Françoise stops him using her powers. Perrot becomes intrigued by Françoise's powers, but she refuses to discuss them. Questioned by Françoise, Perrot reveals that the man from her visions was a sculptor who committed suicide.

That night, Richard shows Françoise a room where Perrot destroyed several works of art by suicidal artists. The following day, Perrot admits to Françoise that it was he who wrote the letters under Marc's name. Perrot also claims he was merely an observer in the mass suicide of the artists, citing the "death of art" as his purpose. Richard and Marc draw straws to decide who will leave with Françoise. Marc loses; Françoise and Richard escape by magically walking into one of Richard's paintings.

== Cast ==
- Catherine Deneuve as Françoise
- Fernando Rey as Perrot
- Adalberto Maria Merli as Marc
- Jacques Weber as Richard
- José Sacristán as Cleber, Perrot's valet
- Emma Cohen as Sophie, Marc's wife
- Laura Betti as Léonore
- José María Caffarel as the lawyer (uncredited)
