= Gran Casino =

- Gran Casino theatrical release poster
- Directed by: Luis Buñuel
- Written by: Mauricio Magdaleno; Edmundo Báez
- Produced by: Oscar Dancigers
- Starring: Libertad Lamarque; Jorge Negrete; Meche Barba; Trío Calaveras
- Distributed by: Ultramar Films
- Release date: 1947
- Running time: 85 minutes
- Country: Mexico
- Language: Spanish

Gran Casino (Alternate title: En el viejo Tampico) is a 1947 Mexican film. It was written by Mauricio Magdaleno and Edmundo Baez, based on a story by Michel Weber, and directed by Luis Buñuel.

== Plot ==
Gerardo (Jorge Negrete) and his friend Demetrio (Julio Villarreal) are a pair of footloose cowboys in turn-of-the-century Mexico who are in prison on dubious charges. As Gerardo sings and strums on his guitar, Demetrio saws the bars of their cell, enabling them to escape. They come upon a small oil field operated by José Enrique (Francisco Jambrina), an entrepreneur from Argentina who is refusing to sell out to evil oil barons who threaten the workers. Gerardo persuades José to give work to him and his friends, and after he and Demetrio recruit more workers, they are able to rejuvenate the struggling operation. Just as their fortunes are on the rise, however, the oilman disappears and is feared murdered. Demetrio takes over the operation next, but the night before the oil is to start pumping, he goes to the casino and falls for Camelia (Mercedes Barba), the same girl José was last seen with before he vanished, and he too disappears.

José's sister Mercedes (Libertad Lamarque) travels to Mexico to find out what has become of him, and when she learns that Gerardo has taken over as manager, she is convinced that Gerardo and his pals are to blame. Wanting to know more about Gerardo and his cronies, she takes a job as a singer at "Gran Casino," a rowdy nightclub near the oil fields. In time, she strikes up a romance with the good-hearted roughneck and learns the identity of her brother's real enemy—Don Fabio (José Baviera), the local front for Big Oil.

== Background ==
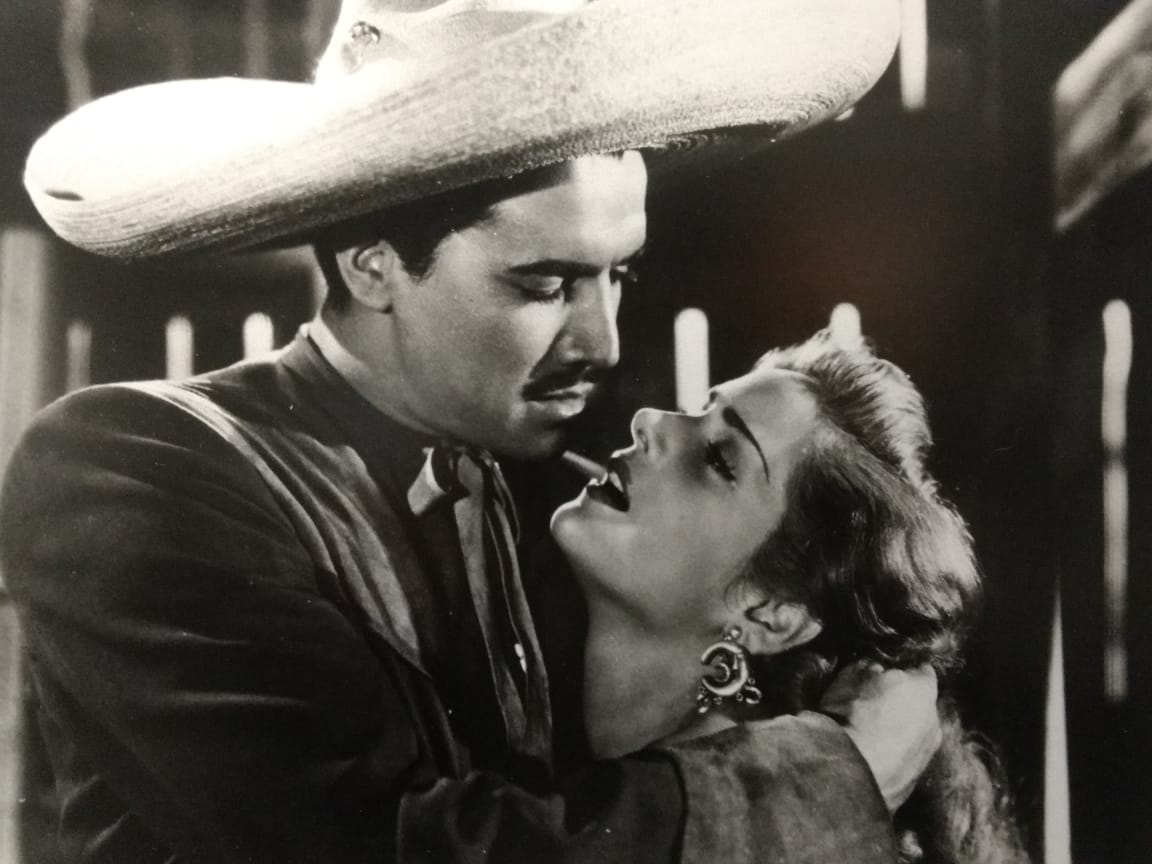
Fotomontaje de escena del filme 'Gran Casino' por Luis Buñuel

=== Libertad Lamarque ===
From the release of the film Honeysuckle in 1938, Libertad Lamarque was the most popular artist in Argentine cinema. She had made her name on stage and radio as a tango singer and she was able to capitalize on that success by combining her singing and acting abilities in pictures that pulled their melodramatic plots straight from the tales told in popular tangos. She often played the part of a tango singer whose romance with a wealthy suitor is thwarted by his snobbish family, making her a compelling symbol of porteño popular culture with a strong anti-elitist identification. In 1945, Larmarque starred in La cabalgata del circo, a pot-boiler about a theatrical troupe in nineteenth-century Argentina, which included in the cast as a supporting player, Eva Duarte, who was being courted by then Colonel Juan Perón, who was on his way to becoming President of the country. Tensions on the set ran high, as Duarte flaunted her relationship with Argentina's strongman by turning up late every day, having him pick her up from the studio in his state limousine and generally behaving as if she were the star of the picture. When Duarte sat in Lamarque's chair one day, Lamarque slapped her across the face, sparking a cause célèbre that delighted Duarte's many enemies. Lamarque added to the intrigue by suggesting that the two had been vying for the attentions of Perón. After October 17, 1945, Loyalty Day, when demonstrations organized with the cooperation of Duarte resulted in Perón's release from a brief stay in jail, Lamarque's films were banned in Argentina. The next year, after Duarte and Perón had married and Perón had been elected President of Argentina, Lamarque fled Buenos Aires for Mexico City, where her films had been extremely popular for years.

=== Oscar Dancigers ===
A French national of Russian-Jewish origin, Oscar Dancigers had fled the Nazis in 1940, due to his membership in the Communist Party, and settled in Mexico, where in short order he had founded Ultramar Films and achieved considerable success as a small independent producer. Dancigers specialized in assisting U.S. film companies with on-location production in Mexico. As such, his company was a direct beneficiary of the American Good Neighbor Policy, under which Mexico received enormous exportations of raw film stock from the U.S. government.
