= Jean Chapot =

French screenwriter and film director

- Born: 15 November 1930; Bois-Guillaume, Seine-Inférieure, France
- Died: 10 April 1998 (aged 67); Neuilly-sur-Seine, Hauts-de-Seine, France
- Occupations: Screenwriter; Film director
- Years active: 1957–1998

Jean Chapot (15 November 1930 – 10 April 1998) was a French screenwriter and film director who began his career as an actor. In 1972, he was awarded the Short Film Palme d'Or for his film Le fusil à lunette at the 25th Cannes Film Festival.

== Selected filmography ==
- Heaven on One's Head (1965)
- La Voleuse (1966)
- The Burned Barns (1973)
