= Juan Luis Buñuel =

French director (1934–2017)

Juan Luis Buñuel (9 November 1934 – 6 December 2017) was a French film and television director, screenwriter, and actor. His films include Expulsion of the Devil (Au rendez-vous de la mort joyeuse, 1973) and La Femme aux bottes rouges (1974).

Buñuel was the son of the filmmaker Luis Buñuel. Buñuel's son Diego, whom he had with fellow filmmaker Joyce Sherman, also took up the profession.

== Filmography ==
=== As director ===
- Calanda (1966)
- Au rendez-vous de la mort joyeuse (Expulsion of the Devil, 1973)
- La Femme aux bottes rouges (1974)
- Léonor (Mistress of the Devil, 1975)
- Fantômas (1980, TV miniseries)
- El Jugador de ajedrez (1981)
- The Rebellion of the Hanged (1986)
- Guanajuato, una leyenda (1990)
