= Don't Tell My Mother =

- Genre: Travel
- Presented by: Diego Buñuel

Production
- Producer: Diego Buñuel

Original release
- Network: National Geographic Adventure

Don't Tell My Mother is a television program hosted by Diego Buñuel and shown on the subscription television channel Nat Geo Adventure.

== Development ==
For the past ten years, Diego Buñuel has been a foreign correspondent for French television covering countries like Iraq, Afghanistan, or the Congo. Every time he left for one of his stories, he would tell his production crew in the Paris office, "Don't tell my mother I am in Colombia, it makes her really nervous." After a few years of traveling repeatedly, Buñuel realized that the international news coverage, which he was part of, only focused on the worst headlines possible. Thus, Buñuel embarked on a rather unusual effort – to talk about countries that make headlines, but instead of focusing on the same three basic stories, he extended the reach of his eye to look at a more subtle vision of these countries, full of culture, people, interests that rise high above the daily news reports.

Don't Tell My Mother criss-crosses the globe as Buñuel stops in burgeoning mega-cities – some plagued by the overwhelming demands that come along with housing millions of residents. But all these cities are riding high on the hopes of newcomers arriving daily in search of opportunity. Whether he is spending the night in one of the most dangerous parts of São Paulo with a group of graffiti artists inspiring radical social change, dressing in drag in Dhaka, or drag racing through Johannesburg, Buñuel explores these diverse metropolises.

Buñuel, on the show, comments: "Travelling is my passion – I'm fascinated by the remarkable stories every country has to offer. It was this desire that led me to travel the world – to Pakistan, Venezuela, Iraq and more – looking for stories and meeting fascinating people along the way. It was a great trip, sometimes travelling to dangerous places, which is why I never told my mother where I was when travelling – check out my video, photos and blogs from the trip here, but do me a favour – Don't Tell My Mother."

== Season 1 ==
=== Colombia ===
Known for drug-trafficking, kidnapping and guns, Colombia has a well-earned reputation for danger. Buñuel gets his first taste of this treacherous lifestyle after meeting a tailor who specializes in bullet-proof clothing. In a country that produces 80 percent of the world's cocaine, Buñuel goes on patrol with the farmers tasked with destroying cocaine plants one-by-one in the mine-littered fields of guerrilla country. Travelling to Medellín, Buñuel visits the abandoned home of drug lord Pablo Escobar, where he tours Escobar's dinosaur park full of towering dinosaur statues, and visits Escobar's pet hippos. Buñuel also meets one of Escobar's former hired gunmen who now teaches the children of his fallen friends. On Dead Man's Road, Buñuel heads to Cali, where travelling at the wrong time of day can get you kidnapped. Kidnapping is so prevalent, one radio station has developed the 'Hostage Voices' programme so relatives can send messages to hostages over the radio. Despite the rampant civil war dividing the country, Colombia has made steps forward – in Picalena Prison, one warden has helped unite right-wing paramilitaries with left-wing guerrillas through an unlikely tactic: soccer.

=== Afghanistan ===
Buñuel takes a 52-minute road trip from the capital Kabul to Taliban hotbed Kandahar, stopping by Mazar-e-Sharif and Herat. From the Kabul golf course, to a female Army helicopter pilot, from an interview with Mullah Omar's look-alike who spent two years in hiding, to the first night-club open to Afghanis, Buñuelexplores stories about a country that many have tried to boil down to burkas, bearded fighters and poppy harvests.

=== Congo ===
Buñuel travels around the Democratic Republic of Congo, a place ridden with gang violence and political instability.

=== Pakistan ===
Buñuel travelled to Pakistan to break some of the stereotypes that have plagued this country. Roaming from Karachi, Hyderabad, Lahore, Islamabad and to end finally in the Pakistani Himalayas.

=== North Korea ===
After leaving behind his cell phone, GPS and even newspapers before entering the country, Buñuel poses as an actor to enter North Korea. Two friendly touring guides accompanied him and provides any necessary information. Starting in the capital of Pyongyang, Buñuel is housed in a hotel built on an island. Attending a Catholic mass in Pyongyang, Buñuel finds that there are no ordained priests in North Korea; mass is led by party members. Buñuel also tours a fairground where children have the chance to 'Kill American Imperialism' in a shooting game. Venturing to the world's largest stadium, Buñuel watches 100,000 dancers perform in celebration of 60 years of dictatorship. While this festivity paints an image of happiness and unity, the portrait is not quite as picturesque in the countryside. The effects of poverty, famine and oppression are deeply etched in the faces of its people and the landscape. Even in Pyongyang, the signs of repression are omnipresent – from the number of dances allowed to be performed (only 5–7 according to one party member) to the images of Kim Jong Il found in every corner.

=== Holy Land (Palestine) ===
Buñuel goes from the Gaza Strip to Jerusalem. We meet a printer of the Martyrs of Gaza; Nadim, a Christian brewer in Ramallah; Lucy, who rescues Palestinian donkeys and tries to rehabilitate them; and rappers at a Gazan bachelor party.

=== Venezuela ===
Buñuel visits Caracas. He stumbles across a socialist protest where tense relations with the U.S. over politics and oil are top of mind for participants. But while government-enforced low costs have made gas unbelievably cheap for Venezuelans – just a few cents per litre – regulations have caused massive food shortages. Buñuel sneaks over the Colombian border to investigate illegal gas smuggling. In the countryside of San Felipe, agrarian reform is putting land back into the hands of the people with former sugar cane workers kicking out their former bosses. With a machete and some VHS film tape, workers mark off their land, waiting for it to be recognised by the local mayor's office. High in the Venezuelan Andes, Buñuel follows two volunteers who bring a mobile library by mule to help families attending school in the mountains. In the Caracas slum of Antimano, he plays pick-up basketball, and visits an area where school is held in the streets.

=== Iraq ===
In Baghdad's Christian quarter, Buñuel visits the booming Iraqi stock market where white boards follow the U.S. $5 million in traded stocks. He finds the stock market is not the only business in Iraq that is thriving – gyms are seeing a significant increase in memberships as men flock to gain muscle in hopes of getting a well-paying job in security. At a heavy metal concert, Buñuel meets some rebellious Iraqi men whose love for death metal, long hair and shaggy beards can put them at odds with more conservative Iraqis. He witnesses a 1,300-year-old burial ritual at one of the world's largest necropolises with millions of people buried in Najaf, and also visits a torture museum in Sulaymaniyah to remember atrocities committed against Iraqi Kurds.

=== Iran ===
Buñuel checks out an underground rap show in Tehran, featuring a performance by a local mullah's son. With a huge following and representatives from more than 30 countries, he attends the Olympics of Koran reading where participants memorise and recite entire chapters of the Koran from heart. Meeting with a Jewish antiques dealer in Tehran, he shares alcohol made from grapes before visiting one of the city's synagogues and heading over to the Iranian parliament with one of its Jewish members. In Esfahan, he takes in a local basketball game and hits the town afterwards with an American player finding stardom in Iran. At Tehran's Museum of Contemporary Art, Buñuel examines works of Picasso, Jackson Pollock, Andy Warhol, Monet and more – all of which have remained in basement storage since 1979. At the Caspian Sea, he hitches a ride with police who monitor the waterways for caviar poachers.

=== Balkans ===
Buñuel visits the Balkans, where tensions still sizzle just below the surface and the slightest misstep can re-open old wounds. His 3,200-kilometre (2,000 mi) road trip across Croatia, Bosnia, Serbia and Kosovo unearths an area recovering from the ravages of war. In Srebrenica, he meets a Bosnian Muslim woman in charge of the uncovering mass graves of more than 8,000 Muslim men and boys massacred days after declaring independence from Serbia. He visits a farm in Tuzla where oil bubbles out of the ground. In Serbia, he takes a guided tour of hangouts where alleged war criminal Radovan Karadzic went incognito before visiting one nostalgic Serb who has recreated Yugoslavia in his own backyard – even presenting Buñuel with his own Yugoslav "passport". Finally, to enter Kosovo, Buñuel must remove his car's license plate in order to safely enter the country to meet with the man responsible for the newly formed country's national anthem and a football team with dreams of playing against other nations.

== Season 2 ==
=== Johannesburg ===
Johannesburg's risen to become the thriving economic hub of the continent.

=== Tokyo ===
Tokyo is by far the biggest city on the planet. Buñuel explores where past and present collide, the line between reality and science fiction is thin.

=== Lagos ===
Buñuel explores Lagos to find out why lots of newcomers arriving the city every day despite its problems of traffic jam, poverty and pollution.

=== Delhi ===
Buñuel explores the reality of the city.

=== Mexico City ===
Buñuel enters the sewers and runs from canine immigration agents to discover just how creative the residents of Ciudad de Mexico really are.

=== São Paulo ===
Buñuel mingles with graffiti artists and dodges bullets to search for a common thread that unites the extremes of rich and poor in São Paulo.

=== Beirut ===
Buñuel travels from the seaside to the mountains, meeting some surprising black-market dealers in Beirut as well as the gay community preparing the first commercial promoting gay tourism to Beirut.

=== Cairo ===
Buñuel explores ancient and modern elements of Cairo.

=== Dhaka ===
Buñuel begins his adventure in an area of Dhaka where the term urban jungle is given new meaning. In this area, macaque monkeys have taken control.

=== Manila ===
Manila faces some of the world's worst urban problems but Buñuel quickly finds out there is an energetic and quirky side to city and its people.

== Season 3 ==
=== Indonesia ===
This explores Indonesia's culture and exports as well as creatures of its rainforest. It also questions the wisdom of some government and policy decisions.

=== Somalia ===
It starts with the Somalia capital Mogadishu where the fight goes on between Islamist revolutionist and the government forces. The theatre of war is shown. Then the program follows the puntland where it is shown how the government is battling the sea piracy in the gulf of Aden. Then it shows the Somaliland where Buñuel is without guards where it is totally different from the other parts of the country.

=== Kazakhstan ===
It starts with Astana the capital of Kazakhstan, followed by a visit to soviet nuclear town of Semipalatinsk. It shows how the country is developing and advancing towards new Kazakhstan.

=== Russia ===
This deals with Russia after the fall of communism. Topics include materialism, the arms trade and the vast land between Moscow and Siberia.

=== Wild Wild West ===
The episode deals with the USA-Mexico border fence cutting off American soil and the world's first commercial spaceport.

== Season 4 ==
=== Pakistan ===
Buñuel goes on a 2,000 kilometre journey across Pakistan, confronting prejudices about Pakistani religion and culture.

=== Antarctica ===
Buñuel spends 28 days in Antarctica, finding shelter and friends in the zero emission base that 27 scientists call home.

=== Central America ===
Buñuel takes a journey through the war-ravaged countries of Guatemala, Honduras, El Salvador and Nicaragua.

=== Ukraine ===
Buñuel explores Ukraine?

=== Thailand ===
From the city streets of Bangkok to the remote villages where residents have formed vigilante groups to fight terrorist groups, Buñuel explores Thailand.
