= Luis Buñuel =

Spanish-Mexican filmmaker (1900–1983)

- Buñuel in 1929
- Born: Luis Buñuel Portolés; 22 February 1900; Calanda, Aragon, Spain
- Died: 29 July 1983 (aged 83); Mexico City, Mexico
- Citizenship: Spanish (renounced 1949); Mexican (from 1949)
- Education: University of Madrid
- Occupation: Filmmaker
- Years active: 1929–1977
- Notable work: Full list
- Spouse: Jeanne Rucar (m. 1934)
- Children: 2, including Juan Luis
- Relatives: Diego Buñuel (grandson)

Luis Buñuel Portolés (Spanish: [ˈlwis βuˈɲwel poɾtoˈles]; 22 February 1900 – 29 July 1983) was a Spanish and Mexican filmmaker who worked in France, Mexico, and Spain. He has been widely considered by many film critics, historians, and directors to be one of the greatest and most influential filmmakers of all time. Buñuel's works are known for their avant-garde surrealism which was also infused with political commentary.

Often associated with the surrealist movement, Buñuel's career spanned the 1920s through the 1970s. He collaborated with surrealist painter Salvador Dalí on Un Chien Andalou (1929) and L'Age d'Or (1930). Both are considered masterpieces of surrealist cinema. From 1947 to 1960, he honed his skills as a director in Mexico, making grounded and human melodramas such as Gran Casino (1947), Los Olvidados (1950) and Él (1953).

Buñuel then transitioned to making artful, surrealistic and satirical films. He earned the Palme d'Or at the 1961 Cannes Film Festival for Viridiana (1961), which criticized the Francoist dictatorship. He satirized social conditions in The Exterminating Angel (1962) and The Discreet Charm of the Bourgeoisie (1972), the latter of which won the Academy Award for Best Foreign Language Film. He also directed Diary of a Chambermaid (1964) and Belle de Jour (1967). He earned the National Society of Film Critics Award for Best Director for his final film, That Obscure Object of Desire (1977).

Buñuel earned five Cannes Film Festival prizes, two Berlin International Film Festival prizes, a BAFTA Award and an Academy Award in 1972. Buñuel received numerous honors including National Prize for Arts and Sciences for Fine Arts in 1977, the Moscow International Film Festival Contribution to Cinema Prize in 1979, and the Career Golden Lion in 1982. He was nominated twice for the Nobel Prize in Literature, in 1968 and then in 1972. Seven of Buñuel's films are included in Sight & Sound's 2012 critics' poll of the top 250 films of all time. Buñuel's obituary in The New York Times called him "an iconoclast, moralist, and revolutionary who was a leader of avant-garde surrealism in his youth and a dominant international movie director half a century later".

== Early life and education ==
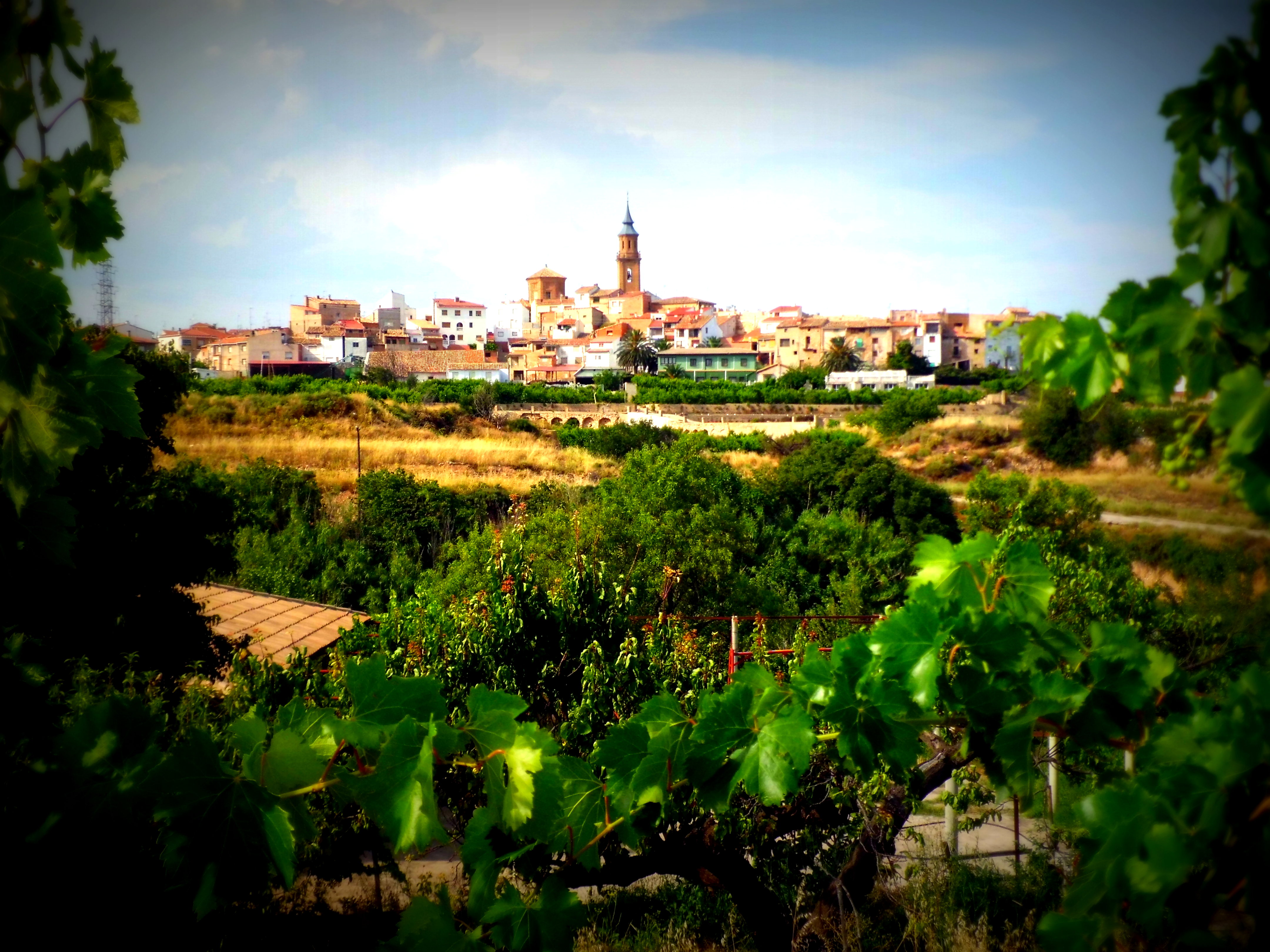
Calanda, Spain, in 2013

Buñuel was born on 22 February 1900 in Calanda, a small town in the Aragon region of Spain. His father was Leonardo Buñuel, also a native of Calanda, who had left home at age 14 to start a hardware business in Havana, Cuba, ultimately amassing a fortune and returning home to Calanda at the age of 43, in 1898. He married the 18-year-old daughter of the only innkeeper in Calanda, María Portolés Cerezuela. The eldest of seven children, Luis had two brothers, Alfonso and Leonardo, and four sisters: Alicia, Concepción, Margarita and María. He later described his birthplace by saying that in Calanda, "the Middle Ages lasted until World War I".

When Buñuel was four months old, the family moved to Zaragoza, where they were one of the wealthiest families in town. In Zaragoza, Buñuel received a strict Jesuit education at the private Colegio del Salvador, starting at the age of seven and continuing for the next seven years. After being kicked and insulted by the study hall proctor before a final exam, Buñuel refused to return to the school. He told his mother he had been expelled, which was not true; in fact, he had received the highest marks on his world history exam. Buñuel finished the last two years of his high school education at the local public school, graduating at the age of 16. Even as a child, Buñuel was something of a cinematic showman; friends from that period described productions in which Buñuel projected shadows on a screen using a magic lantern and a bedsheet. He also excelled at boxing and playing the violin.

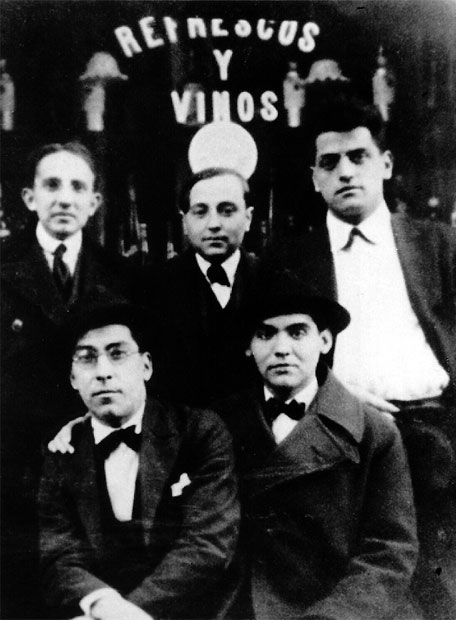
Luis Buñuel (top row, right), Madrid, 1923

In his youth, Buñuel was deeply religious, serving at Mass and taking Communion every day, until, at the age of 16, he grew disgusted with what he perceived as the illogicality of the Church, along with its power and wealth.

In 1917, he attended the University of Madrid, first studying agronomy then industrial engineering and finally switching to philosophy. He developed very close relationships with painter Salvador Dalí and poet Federico García Lorca, among other important Spanish creative artists living in the Residencia de Estudiantes, with the three friends forming the nucleus of the Spanish Surrealist avant-garde, and becoming known as members of "La Generación del 27". Buñuel was especially taken with García Lorca, later writing in his autobiography:

We liked each other instantly. Although we seemed to have little in common—I was a redneck from Aragon, and he an elegant Andalusian—we spent most of our time together...We used to sit on the grass in the evenings behind the Residencia (at that time, there were vast open spaces reaching to the horizon), and he would read me his poems. He read slowly and beautifully, and through him I began to discover a wholly new world.

Buñuel's relationship with Dalí was somewhat more troubled, being tinged with jealousy over the growing intimacy between Dalí and Lorca and resentment over Dalí's early success as an artist.

Buñuel's interest in films was intensified by Fritz Lang's Der müde Tod: "I came out of the Vieux Colombier [theater] completely transformed. Images could and did become for me the true means of expression. I decided to devote myself to the cinema". At the age of 72, Buñuel had not lost his enthusiasm for this film, asking the octogenarian Lang for his autograph.

== Career ==
=== 1925–1930: Early French period ===
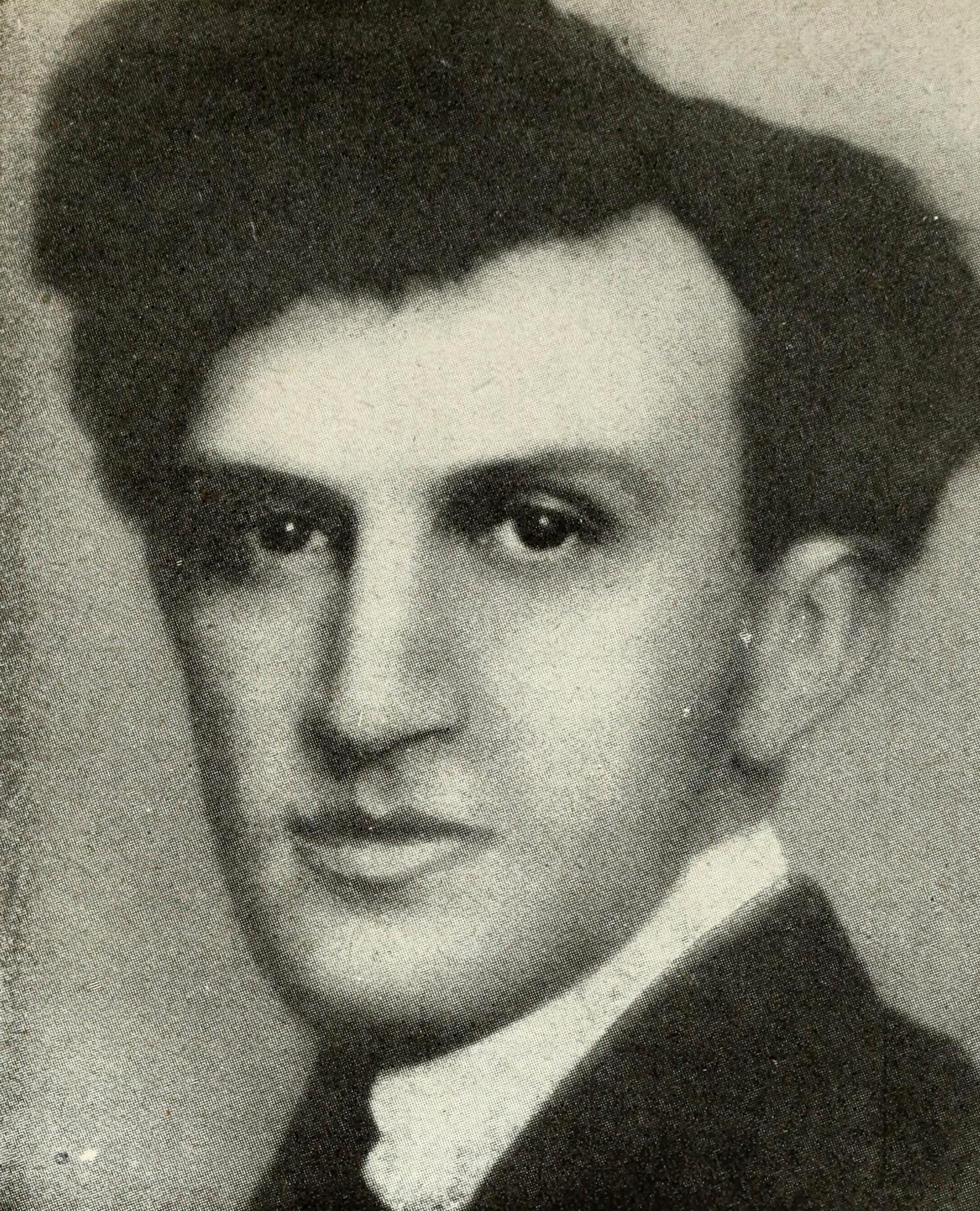
Jean Epstein, Buñuel's first film collaborator

In 1925 Buñuel moved to Paris, where he began work as a secretary in an organization called the International Society of Intellectual Cooperation. He also became actively involved in cinema and theater, going to the movies as often as three times a day. Through these interests, he met a number of influential people, including the pianist Ricardo Viñes, who was instrumental in securing Buñuel's selection as artistic director of the Dutch premiere of Manuel de Falla's puppet-opera El retablo de maese Pedro in 1926.

He decided to enter the film industry and enrolled in a private film school run by Jean Epstein and some associates. At that time, Epstein was one of the most celebrated commercial directors working in France, his films being hailed as "the triumph of impressionism in motion, but also the triumph of the modern spirit". Before long, Buñuel was working for Epstein as an assistant director on Mauprat (1926) and La chute de la maison Usher (1928), and also for Mario Nalpas on La Sirène des Tropiques (Siren of the Tropics) (1927), starring Josephine Baker. He appeared on screen in a small part as a smuggler in Jacques Feyder's Carmen (1926).

When Buñuel derisively rejected Epstein's demand that he assist Epstein's mentor, Abel Gance, who was at the time working on the film Napoléon, Epstein dismissed him angrily, saying "How can a little asshole like you dare to talk that way about a great director like Gance?" then added "You seem rather surrealist. Beware of surrealists, they are crazy people."

After parting with Epstein, Buñuel worked as film critic for La Gaceta Literaria (1927) and Les Cahiers d'Art (1928). In the periodicals L'Amic de les Arts and La gaseta de les Arts, he and Dalí carried on a series of "call and response" essays on cinema and theater, debating such technical issues as segmentation, découpage, the insert shot and rhythmic editing. He also collaborated with the celebrated writer Ramón Gómez de la Serna on the script for what he hoped would be his first film, "a story in six scenes" called Los caprichos. Through his involvement with Gaceta Literaria, he helped establish Madrid's first cine-club and served as its inaugural chairman.

==== Un Chien Andalou (1929) ====
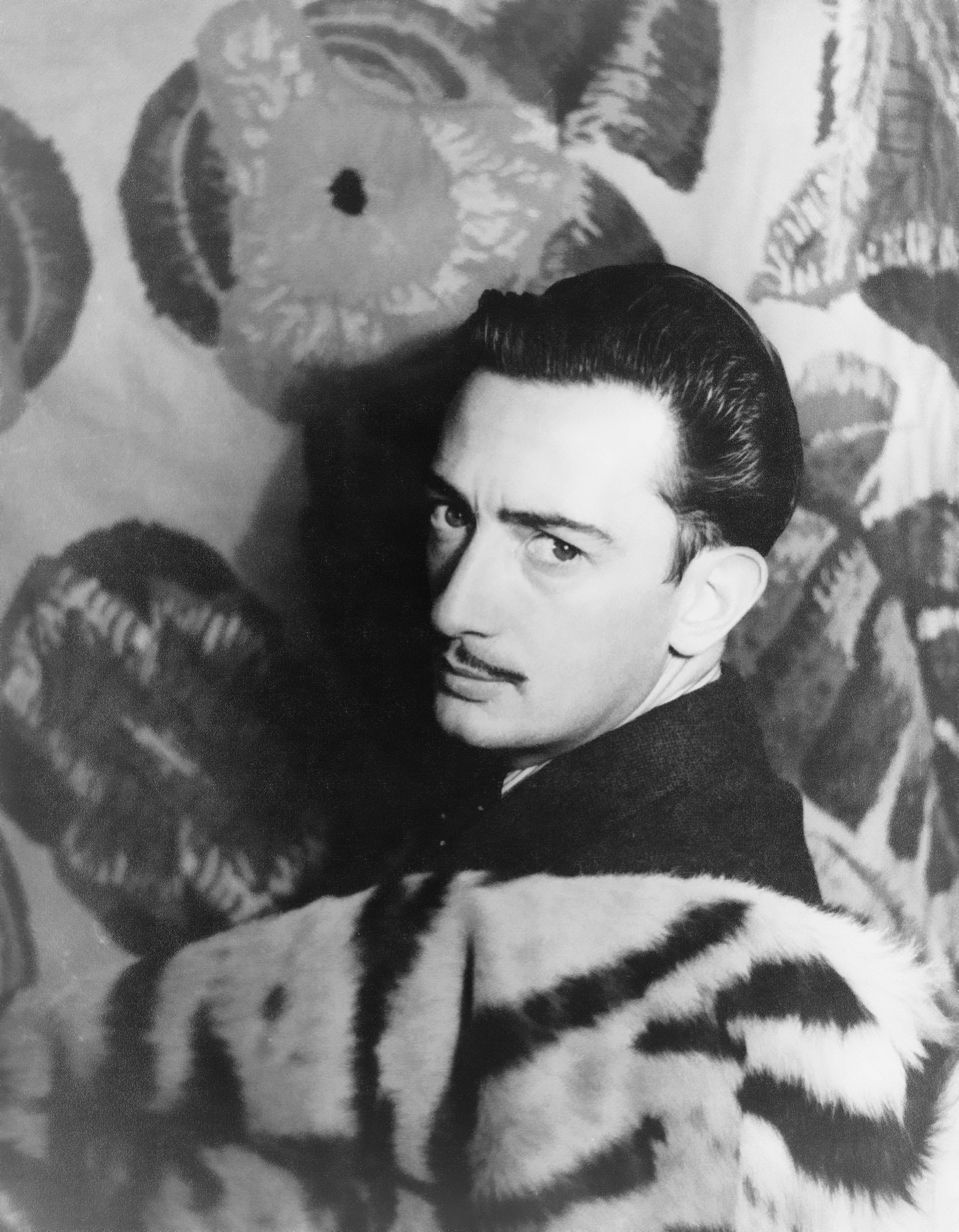
Salvador Dalí

After his apprenticeship with Epstein, Buñuel shot and directed a 16-minute short, Un Chien Andalou, with Salvador Dalí. The film, financed by Buñuel's mother, consists of a series of startling images of a Freudian nature, starting with a woman's eyeball being sliced open with a razor blade. Un Chien Andalou was enthusiastically received by the burgeoning French surrealist movement and continues to be shown regularly in film societies. The script was written in six days at Dalí's home in Cadaqués. In a letter to a friend written in February 1929, Buñuel described the writing process:

We had to look for the plot line. Dalí said to me, 'I dreamed last night of ants swarming around in my hands', and I said, 'Good Lord, and I dreamed that I had sliced somebody or other's eye. There's the film, let's go and make it.'

Un Chien Andalou (1929)

In deliberate contrast to the approach taken by Jean Epstein and his peers, which was to never leave anything in their work to chance, with every aesthetic decision having a rational explanation and fitting clearly into the whole, Buñuel and Dalí made a cardinal point of eliminating all logical associations. In Buñuel's words: "Our only rule was very simple: no idea or image that might lend itself to a rational explanation of any kind would be accepted. We had to open all doors to the irrational and keep only those images that surprised us, without trying to explain why".

It was Buñuel's intention to outrage the self-proclaimed artistic vanguard of his youth, later saying: "Historically the film represents a violent reaction against what in those days was called 'avant-garde,' which was aimed exclusively at artistic sensibility and the audience's reason." Against his hopes and expectations, the film was a popular success with the very audience he had wanted to insult.Roger Ebert called it one of the most famous short films of the century. Buñuel exclaimed in exasperation: "What can I do about the people who adore all that is new, even when it goes against their deepest convictions, or about the insincere, corrupt press, and the inane herd that saw beauty or poetry in something which was basically no more than a desperate impassioned call for murder?"

Although Un Chien Andalou is a silent film, during the original screening (attended by the elite of the Parisian art world), Buñuel played a sequence of phonograph records which he switched manually while keeping his pockets full of stones with which to pelt anticipated hecklers. After the premiere, Buñuel and Dalí were granted formal admittance to the tight-knit community of Surrealists, led by poet André Breton.

==== L'Age d'Or (1930) ====
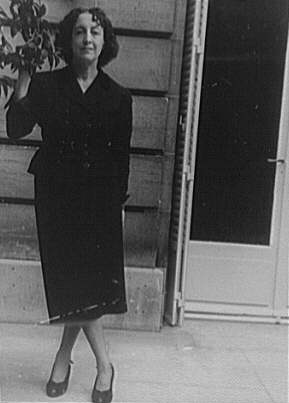
Marie-Laure de Noailles was a prominent patron of avant-garde artists, who received L'Age d'Or as a birthday gift from her husband, Charles.

Late in 1929, on the strength of Un Chien Andalou, Buñuel and Dalí were commissioned to make another short film by Marie-Laurie and Charles de Noailles, owners of a private cinema on the Place des États-Unis and financial supporters of productions by Jacques Manuel, Man Ray and Pierre Chenal. At first, the intent was that the new film be around the same length as Un Chien, only this time with sound. But by mid-1930, the film had grown segmentally to an hour's duration. Anxious that it was over twice as long as planned and at double the budget, Buñuel offered to trim the film and cease production, but Noailles gave him the go-ahead to continue the project.

The film, L'Age d'Or, was begun as a second collaboration with Dalí, but, while working on the scenario, the two had a falling out; Buñuel, who at the time had strong leftist sympathies, desired a deliberate undermining of all bourgeois institutions, while Dalí, who eventually supported the Spanish fascist Francisco Franco and various figures of the European aristocracy, wanted merely to cause a scandal through the use of various scatological and anti-Catholic images. The friction between them was exacerbated when, at a dinner party in Cadaqués, Buñuel tried to throttle Dalí's girlfriend, Gala, the wife of Surrealist poet Paul Éluard. In consequence, Dalí had nothing to do with the actual shooting of the film. During the course of production, Buñuel worked around his technical ignorance by filming mostly in sequence and using nearly every foot of film that he shot. Buñuel invited friends and acquaintances to appear, for nothing, in the film; for example, anyone who owned a tuxedo or a party frock got a part in the salon scene.

A film called L'Age d'or, whose non-existent artistic quality is an insult to any kind of technical standard, combines, as a public spectacle, the most obscene, disgusting and tasteless incidents. Country, family, and religion are dragged through the mud.

— Excerpt from Richard Pierre Bodin's review in Le Figaro, 7 December 1930.

L'Age d'Or was publicly proclaimed by Dalí as a deliberate attack on Catholicism, and this precipitated a much larger scandal than Un Chien Andalou. One early screening was taken over by members of the fascist League of Patriots and the Anti-Jewish Youth Group, who hurled purple ink at the screen and then vandalised the adjacent art gallery, destroying a number of valuable surrealist paintings. The film was banned by the Parisian police "in the name of public order". The de Noailles, both Catholics, were threatened with excommunication by The Vatican because of the film's blasphemous final scene (which visually links Jesus Christ with the writings of the Marquis de Sade), so they made the decision in 1934 to withdraw all prints from circulation, and L'Age d'Or was not seen again until 1981, after their deaths, although a print was smuggled to England for private viewing. The furor was so great that the premiere of another film financed by the de Noailles, Jean Cocteau's The Blood of a Poet, had to be delayed for over two years until outrage over L'Age d'Or had died down. To make matters worse, Charles de Noailles was forced to withdraw his membership from the Jockey Club.

Concurrent with the succès de scandale, both Buñuel and the film's leading lady, Lya Lys, received offers of interest from Metro-Goldwyn-Mayer and traveled to Hollywood at the studio's expense. While in the United States, Buñuel associated with other celebrity expatriates including Sergei Eisenstein, Josef von Sternberg, Jacques Feyder, Charles Chaplin and Bertolt Brecht. All that was required of Buñuel by his loose-ended contract with MGM was that he "learn some good American technical skills", but, after being ushered off the first set he visited because the star, Greta Garbo, did not welcome intruders, he decided to stay at home most of the time and only show up to collect his paycheck. His only enduring contribution to MGM came when he served as an extra in La Fruta Amarga, a Spanish-language remake of Min and Bill. When, after a few months at the studio, he was asked to watch rushes of Lili Damita to gauge her Spanish accent, he refused and sent a message to studio boss Irving Thalberg stating that he was there as a Frenchman, not a Spaniard, and he "didn't have time to waste listening to one of the whores". He was back in Spain shortly thereafter.

=== 1931–1937: Spain ===
Spain in the early 1930s was a time of political and social turbulence. Due to both a surge in anti-clerical sentiment and a longrunning desire for retribution for the corruption and malfeasance of the extreme right and their supporters in the church, Anarchists and Radical Socialists sacked monarchist headquarters in Madrid and proceeded to burn down or otherwise wreck more than a dozen churches in the capital. Similar revolutionary acts occurred in many other cities in southern and eastern Spain, in most cases with the acquiescence and occasionally with the assistance of the official Republican authorities.

Buñuel's future wife, Jeanne Rucar, recalled that during that period, "he got very excited about politics and the ideas that were everywhere in pre-Civil War Spain". In the first flush of his enthusiasm, Buñuel joined the Communist Party of Spain (PCE) in 1931, though later in life he denied becoming a Communist.

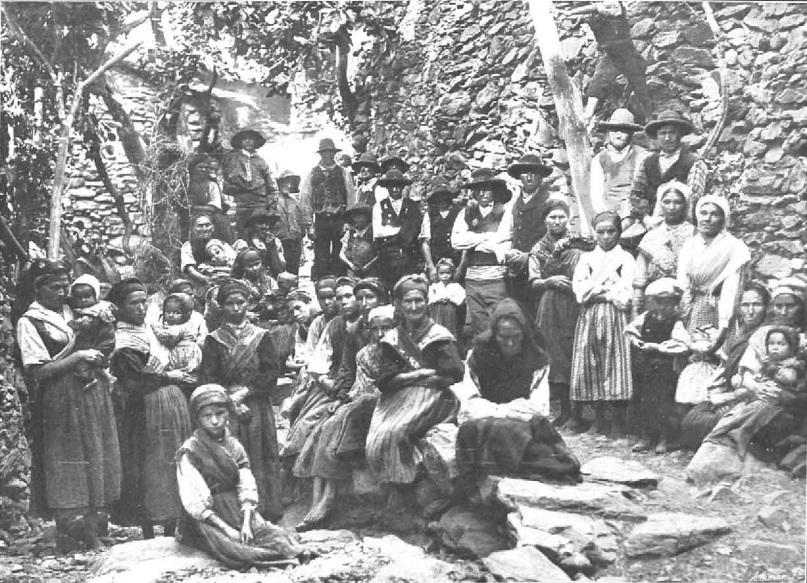
Group of Hurdanos early in the 20th century

In 1932, Buñuel was invited to serve as film documentarian for the celebrated Mission Dakar-Djibouti, the first large-scale French anthropological field expedition, which, led by Marcel Griaule, unearthed some 3,500 African artifacts for the new Musée de l'Homme. Although he declined, the project piqued his interest in ethnography. After reading the academic study, Las Jurdes: étude de géographie humaine (1927) by Maurice Legendre, he decided to make a film focused on peasant life in Las Hurdes, perhaps the poorest comarca in Extremadura, one of Spain's poorest regions. The film, called Las Hurdes: Tierra Sin Pan (1933), was financed on a budget of 20,000 pesetas donated by a working-class anarchist friend named Ramón Acín, who had won the money in a lottery. In the film, Buñuel matches scenes of deplorable social conditions with narration that resembles travelogue commentary delivered by a detached-sounding announcer, while the soundtrack thunders inappropriate music by Brahms.

Though the material is organized with masterly skill, the very conception of "art" here seems irrelevant. It is the most profoundly disturbing film I have ever seen.

— Award-winning film director Tony Richardson on Las Hurdes: Tierra Sin Pan

Las Hurdes was banned by the Second Spanish Republic and then by the Francoist dictatorship. It is a film which continues to perplex viewers and resists easy categorization by film historians. Las Hurdes has been called one of the first examples of mockumentary, and has been labeled a "surrealist documentary", a term defined by critic Mercè Ibarz as "A multi-layered and unnerving use of sound, the juxtaposition of narrative forms already learnt from the written press, travelogues and new pedagogic methods, as well as a subversive use of photographed and filmed documents understood as a basis for contemporary propaganda for the masses". Catherine Russell has stated that in Las Hurdes, Buñuel was able to reconcile his political philosophy with his surrealist aesthetic, with surrealism becoming "a means of awakening a marxist materialism in danger of becoming a stale orthodoxy".

After Las Hurdes in 1933, Buñuel worked in Paris in the dubbing department of Paramount Pictures, but following his marriage in 1934, he switched to Warner Brothers because they operated dubbing studios in Madrid. A friend, Ricardo Urgoiti, who owned the commercial film company Filmófono, invited Buñuel to produce films for a mass audience. He accepted the offer, viewing it as an "experiment" as he knew the film industry in Spain was still far behind the technical level of Hollywood or Paris. According to film historian Manuel Rotellar's interviews with members of the cast and crew of the Filmófono studios, Buñuel's only condition was that his involvement with these pictures be completely anonymous, apparently for fear of damaging his reputation as a surrealist. Rotellar insists, however, "the truth is that it was Luis Buñuel who directed the Filmófono productions". José Luis Sáenz de Heredia, the titular director of two of the films created during Buñuel's years as "executive producer" at Filmófono, recounted that it was Buñuel who "explained to me every morning what he wanted...We looked at the takes together and it was Buñuel who chose the shots, and in editing, I wasn't even allowed to be present." Of the 18 films produced by Buñuel during his years at Filmófono, the four that are believed by critical consensus to have been directed by him are:

- Don Quintín el amargao (Don Quintin the Sourpuss), 1935 – a musical based on a play by Carlos Arniches, the first zarzuela (a type of Spanish opera) filmed in sound.
- La hija de Juan Simón (Juan Simón's Daughter), 1935 – another musical and a major commercial success
- ¿Quién me quiere a mí? (Who Loves Me?), 1936 – a sentimental comedy that Buñuel called "my only commercial failure, and a pretty dismal one at that".
- ¡Centinela, alerta!, (Sentry, Keep Watch!), 1937 – a comedy and Filmófono's biggest box-office hit.

During the Spanish Civil War (1936–1939), Buñuel placed himself at the disposal of the Republican government. The minister for foreign affairs sent him first to Geneva (September 1936) and then to Paris for two years (1936–38), with official responsibility for cataloging Republican propaganda films. Besides the cataloguing, Buñuel took left-wing tracts to Spain, did some occasional spying, acted as a bodyguard, and supervised the making of a documentary, entitled España 1936 in France and España leal, ¡en armas! in Spain, that covered the elections, the parades, the riots, and the war. In August 1936, Federico García Lorca was shot and killed by Nationalist militia. According to his son, Juan Luis, Buñuel rarely talked about Lorca but mourned the poet's untimely death throughout his life.

Buñuel essentially functioned as the coordinator of film propaganda for the Republic, which meant that he was in a position to examine all film shot in the country and decide what sequences could be developed and distributed abroad. The Spanish Ambassador suggested that Buñuel revisit Hollywood where he could give technical advice on films being made there about the Spanish Civil War, so in 1938, he and his family traveled to the United States using funds obtained from his old patrons, the Noailles. Almost immediately upon his arrival in America, however, the war ended and the Motion Picture Producers and Distributors Association of America discontinued making films on the Spanish conflict. According to Buñuel's wife, returning to Spain was impossible since the Fascists had seized power, so Buñuel decided to stay in the U.S. indefinitely, stating that he was "immensely attracted by the American naturalness and sociability".

=== 1938–1945: United States ===
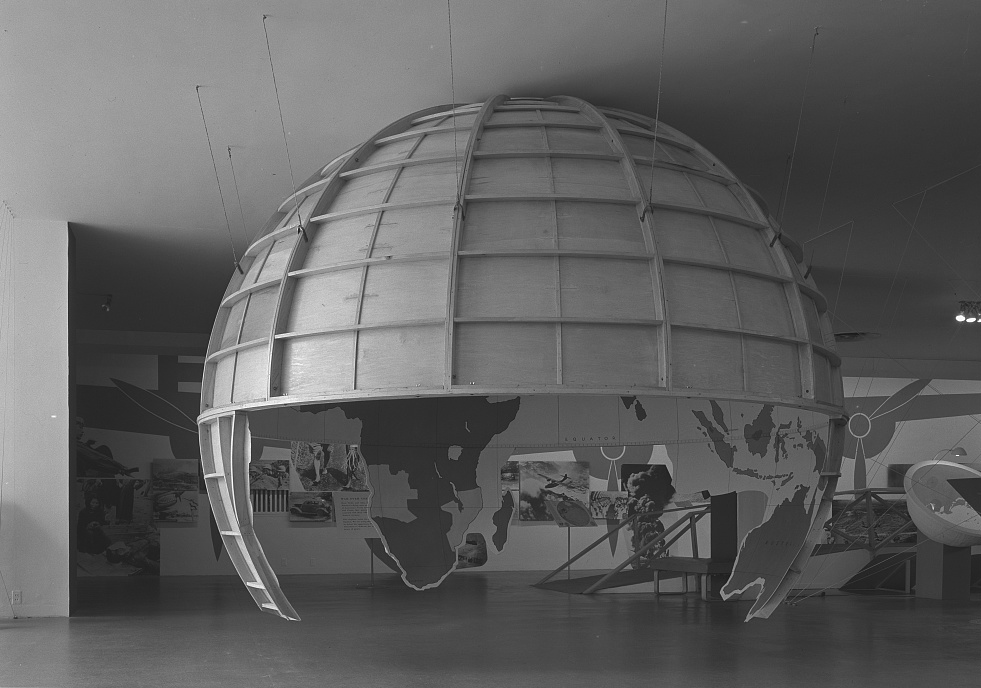
Museum of Modern Art, 1943. Buñuel was employed at MOMA during WWII, supervising and editing documentaries for Latin American countries, commissioned by the Committee on Inter-American Affairs headed by Nelson Rockefeller.

Returning to Hollywood in 1938, he was befriended by Frank Davis, an MGM producer and member of the Communist Party USA, who placed Buñuel on the payroll of Cargo of Innocence, a film about Spanish refugee mothers and children fleeing from Bilbao to the USSR. The project was shelved precipitately when another Hollywood film about the Spanish Civil War, Blockade, was met with disfavor by the Catholic League of Decency. In the words of biographer Ruth Brandon, Buñuel and his family "lived from one unsatisfactory crumb of work to another" because he "had none of the arrogance and pushiness essential for survival in Hollywood". He just was not flamboyant enough to capture the attention of Hollywood decision makers, in the opinion of film composer George Antheil: "Inasmuch as [Buñuel], his wife and his little boy seemed to be such absolutely normal, solid persons, as totally un-Surrealist in the Dalí tradition as one could possibly imagine." For the most part, he was snubbed by many of the people in the film community whom he met during his first trip to America, although he was able to sell some gags to Chaplin for The Great Dictator (1940).

In desperation, to market himself to independent producers, he composed a 21-page autobiography, a section of which, headed "My Present Plans", outlined proposals for two documentary films:

- "The Primitive Man", which would depict "the terrible struggle of primitive man against a hostile universe, how the world appeared, how they saw it, what ideas they had on love, on death, on fraternity, how and why religion is born", [italics in original]
- "Psycho-Pathology", which would "expose the origin and development of different psychopathic diseases...Such a documental film, apart from its great scientific interest, could depict on screen a New Form of Terror or its synonym Humour." [italics in original]

Nobody showed any interest and Buñuel realized that staying in Los Angeles was futile, so he traveled to New York City to see if he could change his fortunes.

Luis Buñuel was there, with his thyroid eyes, the moles on his chin which I remember from so long ago when we first saw the surrealist films in the Cinémathèque ... and as he talked I remember thinking that his paleness was most appropriate for someone who spent his life in dark projection rooms ... He has a sharp humor, a bitter sarcasm, and at the same time towards women a gentle, special smile.

— Anaïs Nin, in her diary entry on encountering Buñuel when he was working at MoMA

In New York City, Antheil introduced Buñuel to Iris Barry, chief curator of film at the Museum of Modern Art (MoMA). Barry talked Buñuel into joining a committee formed to help educate those within the U.S. government who might not have appreciated fully the effectiveness of film as a medium of propaganda. Buñuel was hired to produce a shortened version of Leni Riefenstahl's Triumph of the Will (1935) as a demonstration project. The finished product was a compilation of scenes from Riefenstahl's Nazi epic with Hans Bertram's Feuertaufe. Buñuel stayed at MoMA to work for the Office of the Coordinator of Inter-American Affairs (OCIAA) as part of a production team that gathered, reviewed and edited films intended as anti-fascist propaganda to be distributed in Latin America by American embassies. While being vetted for the job at the OCIAA, upon being asked if he was a Communist, he replied: "I am a Republican," and, apparently, the interviewer did not realize that Buñuel was referring to the Spanish socialist coalition government, not the American political party. Describing Buñuel's work at MoMA, his friend, composer Gustavo Pittaluga, stated: "Luis created maybe 2,000 remarkable works. We were sent anodyne documentaries, often extremely feeble primary materials, which the Museum team turned into marvellous films. And not just Spanish versions, but also Portuguese, French and English...He would create a good documentary through editing." [italics in original]

In 1942, Buñuel applied for American citizenship because he anticipated that MoMA would be put under federal control. This same year, Dalí published The Secret Life of Salvador Dalí, in which he made it clear that he had split with Buñuel because the latter was a Communist and an atheist. News of this reached Archbishop Spellman, who angrily confronted Barry with the question: "Are you aware that you are harbouring in this Museum the Antichrist, the man who made a blasphemous film L'Age d'Or?" At the same time, a campaign on the part of Hollywood, through its industry trade paper, the Motion Picture Herald, to undermine the MoMA film unit resulted in a 66% reduction in the department's budget and Buñuel felt himself compelled to resign. In 1944, he returned to Hollywood for the third time, this time as Spanish Dubbing Producer for Warner Brothers. Before leaving New York City, he confronted Dalí at his hotel, the Sherry Netherland, to tell the painter about the damage his book had done and then shoot him in the knee. Buñuel did not carry out the violent part of his plan. Dalí explained himself by saying: "I did not write my book to put YOU on a pedestal. I wrote it to put ME on a pedestal".

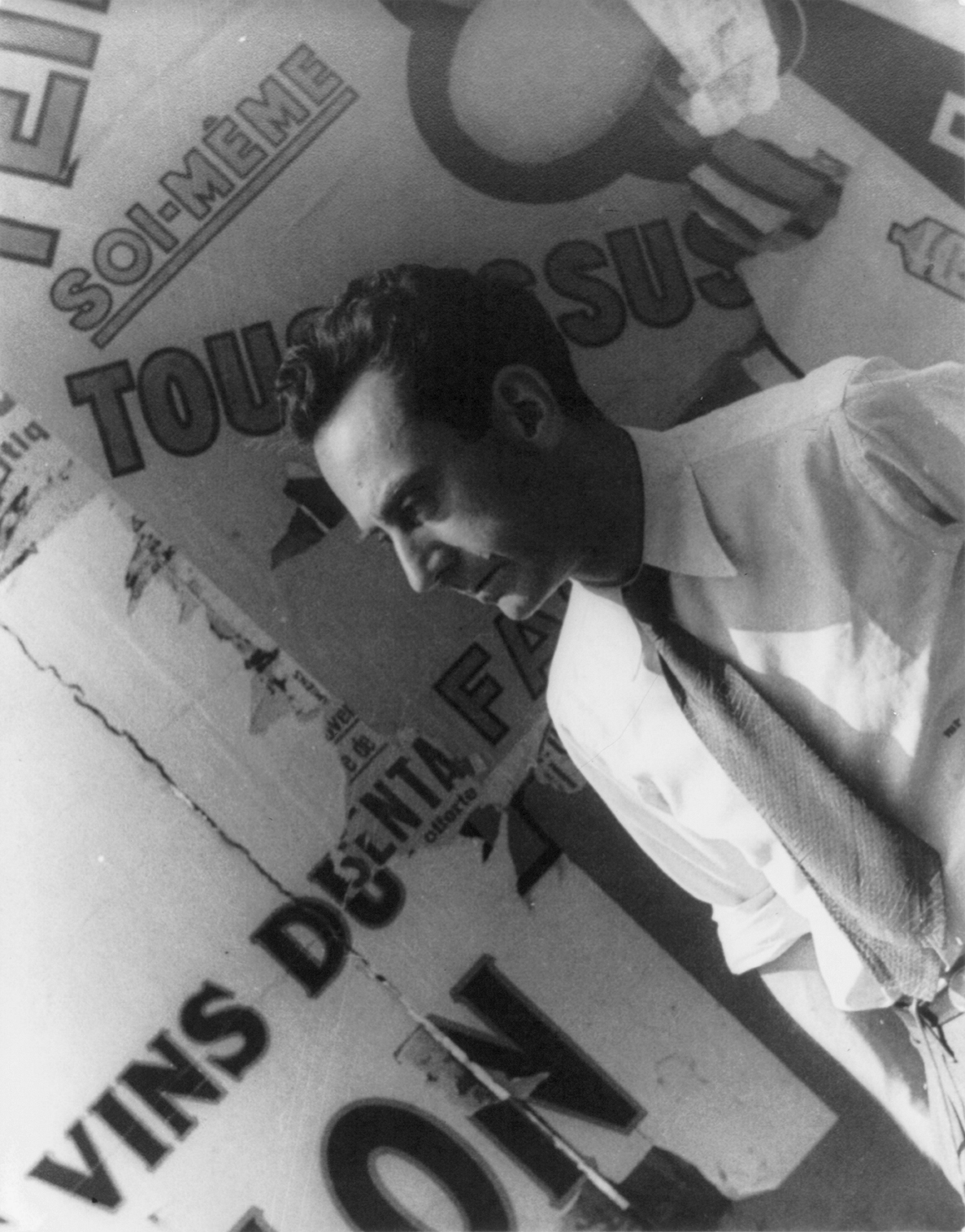
Man Ray – a friend from Buñuel's surrealist period and collaborator on unrealized Hollywood projects

Buñuel's first dubbing assignment on returning to Hollywood was My Reputation, a Barbara Stanwyck picture which became El Que Diran in Buñuel's hands. In addition to his dubbing work, Buñuel attempted to develop a number of independent projects:

- In collaboration with an old friend from his Surrealist days, Man Ray, he worked on a scenario called The Sewers of Los Angeles, which took place on a mountain of excrement close to a highway and a dust basin.
- With his friend, José Rubia Barcia, he co-wrote a screenplay called La novia de medianoche (The Midnight Bride), a gothic thriller, which lay dormant until it was filmed by Antonio Simón in 1997.
- He continued working on a screenplay called "Goya and the Duchess of Alba", a treatment he had started as early as 1927, with the actor/producer Florián Rey and cameraman José María Beltrán, and then resuscitated in 1937 as a project for Paramount.
- In his autobiography Mon Dernier soupir (1982, translated in the U.S. as My Last Sigh, 1983, and in the UK as My Last Breath, 1984), Buñuel wrote that, at the request of director Robert Florey, he submitted a treatment of a scene about a disembodied hand, which was later included in the movie The Beast with Five Fingers (1946), starring Peter Lorre, without acknowledgement of Buñuel's contribution or payment of any compensation. However, Brian Taves, film scholar and archivist with the Library of Congress, has challenged the truth of this claim.

In 1945, Buñuel's contract with Warner Brothers expired, and he decided not to renew it in order, as he put it: "to realize my life's ambition for a year: to do nothing". While his family enjoyed themselves at the beach, Buñuel spent much of his time in Antelope Valley with new acquaintances writer Aldous Huxley and sculptor Alexander Calder, from whom he rented a house.

In his autobiography, in a chapter about his second spell in America, Buñuel states that "[o]n several occasions, both American and European producers have suggested that I tackle a film version of Malcolm Lowry's Under the Volcano", but that after reading the book many times as well as eight different screenplays he was unable to come up with a solution for the cinema. The movie was eventually made in 1984 by John Huston.

=== 1946–1953: Mexico ===
In 1946, an old friend, producer Denise Tual, the widow of Pierre Batcheff, the leading man in Un Chien Andalou, proposed that she and Buñuel adapt Lorca's play La casa de Bernarda Alba for production in Paris. As it turned out, though, before they could both make their way to Europe, they encountered problems in securing the rights from Lorca's family. While in Mexico City, on a stopover, they had asked Óscar Dancigers, a Russian émigré producer active in Mexico, for financing. Dancigers ran an independent production company that specialized in assisting U.S. film studios with on-location shooting in Mexico, but following World War II, he had lost his connection with Hollywood due to his being blacklisted as a Communist. Although Dancigers was not enthusiastic about the Lorca project, he did want to work with Buñuel and persuaded the Spanish director to undertake a totally different project.

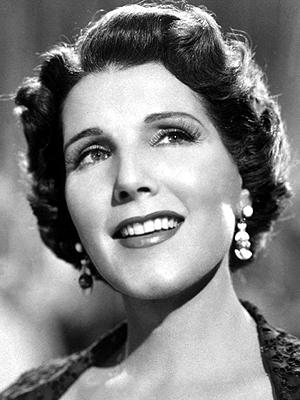
Libertad Lamarque, star of Buñuel's first Mexican film. Buñuel was said to have held a long-time grudge against Lamarque because the actress was able to bring him to tears when he viewed a "corny melodrama" which she had made in Argentina: "How could I let myself cry over such an absurd, grotesque, ridiculous scene?"

The Golden Age of Mexican cinema was peaking in the mid-to-late 1940s, at just the time Buñuel was connecting with Dancigers. Movies represented Mexico's third largest industry by 1947, employing 32,000 workers, with 72 film producers who invested 66 million pesos (approximately U.S. $13 million) per year, four active studios with 40 million pesos of invested capital, and approximately 1,500 theaters throughout the nation, with about 200 in Mexico City alone. For their first project, the two men selected what seemed like a sure-fire success, Gran Casino, a musical period piece set in Tampico during the boom years of oil exploitation, starring two of the most popular entertainers in Latin America: Libertad Lamarque, an Argentine actress and singer, and Jorge Negrete, a Mexican singer and leading man in "charro" films. Buñuel recalled: "I kept them singing all the time—a competition, a championship".

The film was not successful at the box office, with some even calling it a fiasco. Different reasons have been given for its failure with the public; for some, Buñuel was forced to make concessions to the bad taste of his stars, particularly Negrete, others cite Buñuel's rusty technical skills and lack of confidence after so many years out of the director's chair, while still others speculate that Mexican audiences were tiring of genre movies, called "churros", that were perceived as being cheaply and hastily made.

The failure of Gran Casino sidelined Buñuel, and it was over two years before he had the chance to direct another picture. According to Buñuel, he spent this time "scratching my nose, watching flies and living off my mother's money", but he was actually somewhat more industrious than that may sound. With the husband/wife team of Janet and Luis Alcoriza, he wrote the scenario for Si usted no puede, yo sí, which was filmed in 1950 by Julián Soler. He also continued developing the idea for a surrealistic film called Ilegible, hijo de flauta, with the poet Juan Larrea. Dancigers pointed out to him that there was currently public interest in films about street urchins, so Buñuel scoured the back streets and slums of Mexico City in search of material, interviewing social workers about street gang warfare and murdered children.

During this period, Dancigers was busy producing films for the actor/director Fernando Soler, one of the most durable of Mexican film personalities, having been referred to as the "national paterfamilias". Although Soler typically preferred to direct his own films, for their next collaboration, El Gran Calavera, based on a play by Adolfo Torrado, he decided that doing both jobs would be too much trouble, so he asked Dancigers to find someone who could be trusted to handle the technical aspects of the directorial duties. Buñuel welcomed the opportunity, stating that: "I amused myself with the montage, the constructions, the angles...All of that interested me because I was still an apprentice in so-called 'normal' cinema." As a result of his work on this film, he developed a technique for making films cheaply and quickly by limiting them to 125 shots. El Gran Calavera was completed in 16 days at a cost of 400,000 pesos (approximately $46,000 US at 1948 exchange rates). The picture has been described as "a hilarious screwball send-up of the Mexican nouveau riche...a wild roller coaster of mistaken identity, sham marriages and misfired suicides", and it was a big hit at the box office in Mexico. In 2013, the picture was re-made by Mexican director Gary Alazraki under the title The Noble Family. In 1949, Buñuel renounced his Spanish citizenship to become a naturalized Mexican however different sources stated that he retained his Spanish citizenship along with the Mexican one although remains largely disputed, since it was kept private from the public eye.

The commercial success of El Gran Calavera enabled Buñuel to redeem a promise he had extracted from Dancigers, which was that if Buñuel could deliver a money-maker, Dancigers would guarantee "a degree of freedom" on the next film project. Knowing that Dancigers was uncomfortable with experimentalism, especially when it might affect the bottom line, Buñuel proposed a commercial project titled ¡Mi huerfanito jefe!, about a juvenile street vendor who can't sell his final lottery ticket, which ends up being the winner and making him rich. Dancigers was open to the idea, but instead of a "feuilleton", he suggested making "something rather more serious". During his recent researches through the slums of Mexico City, Buñuel had read a newspaper account of a twelve-year-old boy's body being found on a garbage dump, and this became the inspiration, and final scene, for the film, eventually called Los Olvidados.

The world doesn't work like Hollywood told us it does, and Buñuel knew well that poverty's truths could not be window-dressed in any way. This film continues to provoke reactions for its unapologetic portrayal of life without hope or trust. It stands out among Buñuel's works as the moment when he broke surface and bellowed, before sinking back into the world of the privileged where his surreal view most loved to play.

— Booker Prize winning author DBC Pierre on Los Olvidados

The film tells the story of a street gang of children who terrorize their impoverished neighborhood, at one point brutalizing a blind man and at another assaulting a legless man who moves around on a dolly, which they toss down a hill. Film historian Carl J. Mora has said of Los Olvidados that the director "visualized poverty in a radically different way from the traditional forms of Mexican melodrama. Buñuel's street children are not 'ennobled' by their desperate struggle for survival; they are in fact ruthless predators who are not better than their equally unromanticized victims". The film was made quickly (18 days) and cheaply (450,000 pesos), with Buñuel's fee being the equivalent of $2,000. During filming, a number of members of the crew resisted the production in a variety of ways: one technician confronted Buñuel and asked why he didn't make a "real" Mexican movie "rather than a miserable picture like this one"; the film's hairdresser quit on the spot over a scene in which the protagonist's mother refuses to give him food ("In Mexico, no mother would say that to her son."); another staff member urged Buñuel to abandon shooting on a "garbage heap", noting that there were many "lovely residential neighborhoods like Las Lomas" that were available; while Pedro de Urdimalas, one of the scriptwriters, refused to allow his name in the credits.

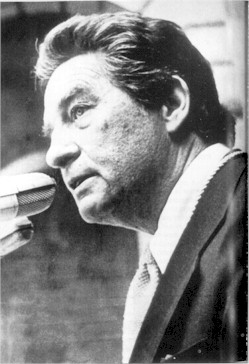
Octavio Paz, ardent champion of Los Olvidados and close friend during Buñuel's exile in Mexico

This hostility was also felt by those who attended the movie's première in Mexico City on 9 November 1950, when Los Olvidados was taken by many as an insult to Mexican sensibilities and to the Mexican nation. At one point, the audience shrieked in shock as one of the characters looked straight into the camera and hurled a rotten egg at it, leaving a gelatinous, opaque ooze on the lens for a few moments. In his memoir, Buñuel recalled that after the initial screening, the painter Frida Kahlo refused to speak to him, while poet León Felipe's wife had to be restrained physically from attacking him. There were even calls to have Buñuel's Mexican citizenship revoked. Dancigers, panicked by what he feared would be a complete debacle, quickly commissioned an alternate "happy" ending to the film, and also tacked on a preface showing stock footage of the skylines of New York City, London and Paris with voice-over commentary to the effect that behind the wealth of all the great cities of the world can be found poverty and malnourished children, and that Mexico City "that large modern city, is no exception". Regardless, attendance was so poor that Dancigers withdrew the film after only three days in theaters.

Through the efforts of future Nobel Prize for Literature laureate Octavio Paz, who at the time was in Mexico's diplomatic service, Los Olvidados was chosen to represent Mexico at the Cannes Film Festival of 1951, and Paz promoted the film assiduously by distributing a supportive manifesto and parading outside the cinema with a placard. Opinion in general was enthusiastic, with the Surrealists (Breton and poet Jacques Prévert) and other artistic intellectuals (painter Marc Chagall and poet/dramatist/filmmaker Jean Cocteau) laudatory, but the communist critic Georges Sadoul objected to what he saw as the film's "bourgeois morality" because of its positive depictions of a "bourgeois teacher" and a "bourgeois state" in rehabilitating street children, as well as a scene in which the police demonstrate their utility by stopping a pederast from assaulting a child. Buñuel won the Best Director prize that year at Cannes, and also won the FIPRESCI International Critics' Award. The film was reissued in Mexico where it ran for two months to much greater acceptance and profit. Los Olvidados and its triumph at Cannes made Buñuel a celebrity and the most important Spanish-speaking film director in the world. In 2003, Los Olvidados was inscribed by UNESCO in the Memory of the World International Register, calling it: "the most important document in Spanish about the marginal lives of children in contemporary large cities".

Here in Mexico, I have become a professional in the film world. Until I came here I made a film the way a writer makes a book, and on my friends' money at that. I am very grateful and happy to have lived in Mexico, and I have been able to make my films here in a way I could not have in any other country in the world. It is quite true that in the beginning, caught up by necessity, I was forced to make cheap films. But I never made a film which went against my conscience or my convictions. I have never made a superficial, uninteresting film.

— Luis Buñuel on his mid-century career in Mexico.

Buñuel remained in Mexico for the rest of his life, although he spent periods of time filming in France and Spain. In Mexico, he filmed 21 films over 18 years. For many critics, although there were occasional widely acknowledged masterpieces like Los Olvidados and Él (1953), the majority of his output consisted of generic fare which was adapted to the norms of the national film industry, frequently adopting melodramatic conventions that appealed to local tastes. Other commentators, however, have written of the deceptive complexity and intensity of many of these films, arguing that, collectively, they, "bring a philosophical depth and power to his cinema, together offering a sustained meditation on ideas of religion, class inequity, violence and desire". Although Buñuel usually had little choice regarding the selection of these projects, they often deal with themes that were central to his lifelong concerns:

- sexual pathology: Él (1953), Ensayo de un crimen (1955), and Abismos de pasión (1954)
- the destructive effects of rampant machismo: El Bruto, (1953), El río y la muerte, (1955);
- the blurring of fantasy and reality: Subida al cielo (1952), La ilusión viaja en tranvía (1954);
- the disruptive status of women in a male-dominated culture: Susana (1951), La hija del engaño (1951—a remake of the Filmófono production Don Quintín el amargao of 16 years earlier), Una mujer sin amor (1952); and
- the absurdity of the religious life: Nazarín (1959) and Simón del desierto (1965).

Pauline Kael says of Buñuel that "at his most indifferent" he is sometimes at his best and most original, as seen in parts of Nazarin.

As busy as he was during the 1950s and early 1960s, there were still many film projects that Buñuel had to abandon due to lack of financing or studio support, including a cherished plan to film Mexican novelist Juan Rulfo's Pedro Páramo, of which he enjoyed "the crossing from the mysterious to the real, almost without transition. I really like this mixture of reality and fantasy, but I don't know how to bring it to the screen." Other unrealized projects during his lifetime included adaptations of André Gide's Les caves du Vatican; Benito Pérez Galdós's Fortunata y Jacinta, Doña Perfecta and Ángel Guerra; Evelyn Waugh's The Loved One; William Golding's Lord of the Flies; Dalton Trumbo's Johnny Got His Gun; J. K. Huysmans's Là-Bas; Matthew Lewis's The Monk; José Donoso's Lugar sin límites; a film of four stories based on Carlos Fuentes's Aura; and Julio Cortázar's Las ménades.

=== 1954–1965: International work ===
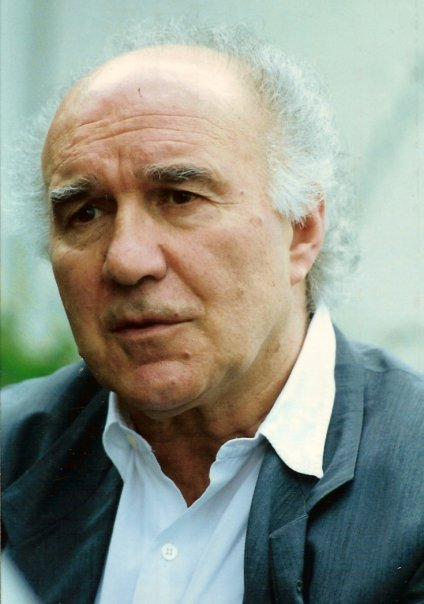
Michel Piccoli. The popular French film star appeared in six Buñuel films, beginning with La Mort en ce jardin, 1956.

As much as he welcomed steady employment in the Mexican film industry, Buñuel was quick to seize opportunities to re-emerge onto the international film scene and to engage with themes that were not necessarily focused on Mexican preoccupations. His first chance came in 1954, when Dancigers partnered with Henry F. Ehrlich, of United Artists, to co-produce a film version of Daniel Defoe's Robinson Crusoe, using a script developed by the Canadian writer Hugo Butler. The film was produced by George Pepper, the former executive secretary of the Hollywood Democratic Committee. Both Butler and Pepper were emigres from Hollywood who had run afoul of authorities seeking out communists. The result, Adventures of Robinson Crusoe, was Buñuel's first color film. Buñuel was given much more time than usual for the filming (three months), which was accomplished on location in Manzanillo, a Pacific seaport with a lush jungle interior, and was shot simultaneously in English and Spanish. When the film was released in the United States, its young star Dan O'Herlihy used his own money to fund a Los Angeles run for the film and gave free admission to all members of the Screen Actors Guild, who in turn rewarded the little-known actor with his only Oscar nomination.

In the mid-1950s, Buñuel got the chance to work again in France on international co-productions. The result was what critic Raymond Durgnat has called the director's "revolutionary triptych", in that each of the three films is "openly, or by implication, a study in the morality and tactics of armed revolution against a right-wing dictatorship". The first, Cela s'appelle l'aurore (Franco-Italian, 1956) required Buñuel and the "pataphysical" writer Jean Ferry to adapt a novel by Emmanuel Roblès after the celebrated writer Jean Genet failed to deliver a script after having been paid in full. The second film was La Mort en ce jardin (Franco-Mexican, 1956), which was adapted by Buñuel and his frequent collaborator Luis Alcoriza from a novel by the Belgian writer José-André Lacour. The final part of the "triptych" was La Fièvre Monte à El Pao (Franco-Mexican, 1959), the last film of the popular French star Gérard Philipe, who died in the final stages of the production. At one point during the filming, Buñuel asked Philipe, who was visibly dying of cancer, why the actor was making this film, and Philipe responded by asking the director the same question, to which both said they did not know. Buñuel was later to explain that he was so strapped for cash that he, "took everything that was offered to me, as long as it wasn't humiliating".

In 1960, Buñuel re-teamed with scenarist Hugo Butler and organizer George Pepper, allegedly his favorite producer, to make his second English-language film, a US/Mexico co-production called The Young One, based on a short story by writer and former CIA-agent Peter Matthiessen. This film has been called "a surprisingly uncompromising study of racism and sexual desire, set on a remote island in the Deep South" and has been described by critic Ed Gonzalez as "salacious enough to make Elia Kazan's Baby Doll and Luis Malle's Pretty Baby blush". Although the film won a special award at the Cannes Film Festival for its treatment of racial discrimination, the US critics were so hostile upon its release that Buñuel was later to say that "a Harlem newspaper even wrote that I should be hung upside down from a lamppost on Fifth Avenue...I made this film with love, but it never had a chance."

At the 1960 Cannes Festival, Buñuel was approached by the young director Carlos Saura, whose film Los Golfos had been entered officially to represent Spain. Two years earlier, Saura had partnered with Juan Antonio Bardem and Luis García Berlanga to form a production company called UNINCI, and the group was keen to get Buñuel to make a new film in his native country as part of their overall goal of creating a uniquely Spanish brand of cinema. At the same time, Mexican actress Silvia Pinal was eager to work with Buñuel and talked her producer-husband Gustavo Alatriste into providing additional funding for the project with the understanding that the director, who Pinal described as "a man worshiped and idolized", would be given "absolute freedom" in carrying out the work. Finally, Buñuel agreed to work again in Spain when further support was provided by producer Pere Portabella's company Film 59.

Buñuel and his co-scenarist Julio Alejandro drafted a preliminary screenplay for Viridiana, which critic Andrew Sarris has described as incorporating "a plot which is almost too lurid to synopsize even in these enlightened times", dealing with rape, incest, hints of necrophilia, animal cruelty and sacrilege, and submitted it to the Spanish censor, who, to the surprise of nearly everyone, approved it after requesting only minor modifications and one significant change to the ending. Although Buñuel accommodated the censor's demands, he came up with a final scene that was even more provocative than the scene it replaced: "even more immoral", as Buñuel was later to observe. Since Buñuel had more than adequate resources, top-flight technical and artistic crews, and experienced actors, filming of Viridiana (which took place on location and at Bardem's studios in Madrid) went smoothly and quickly.

Buñuel submitted a cutting copy to the censors and then arranged for his son, Juan Luis, to smuggle the negatives to Paris for the final editing and mixing, ensuring that the authorities would not have an opportunity to view the finished product before its planned submission as Spain's official entry to the 1961 Cannes Festival. Spain's director general of cinematography José Muñoz-Fontán presented the film on the last day of the festival and then, on the urging of Portabella and Bardem, appeared in person to accept the top prize, the Palme d'Or, which the film shared with the French entry Une aussi longue absence, directed by Henri Colpi. Within days, l'Osservatore Romano, the Vatican's official organ, denounced the film as an insult not only to Catholicism but to Christianity. Muñoz-Fontán was dismissed from his government post, the film was banned in Spain for the next 17 years, all mention of it in the press was prohibited, and the two Spanish production companies UNINCI and Film 59 were disbanded.

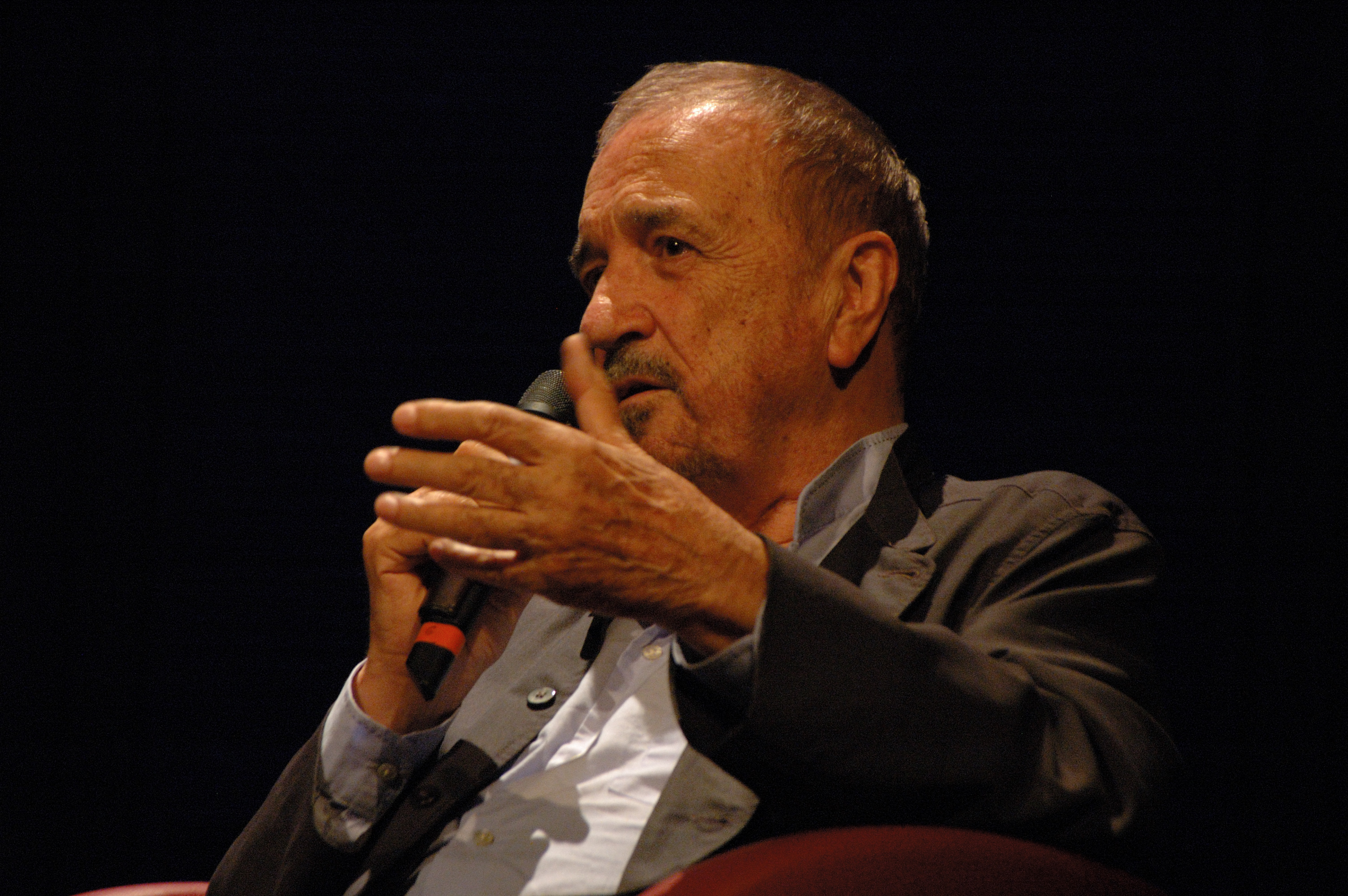
"When today I amuse myself by making useless calculations, I realize that Buñuel and I shared more than two thousand meals together and that on more than fifteen hundred occasions he knocked on my door, notes in hand, ready to begin work. I'm not even counting the walks, the drinks, the films we watched together, the film festivals." – Jean-Claude Carrière on his long-term collaboration with Buñuel.

Buñuel went on to make two more films in Mexico with Pinal and Alatriste, El ángel exterminador (1962) and Simón del desierto (1965) and was later to say that Alatriste had been the one producer who gave him the most freedom in creative expression.

In 1963, actor Fernando Rey, one of the stars of Viridiana, introduced Buñuel to producer Serge Silberman, a Polish entrepreneur who had fled to Paris when his family died in the Holocaust and had worked with several renowned French directors, including Jean-Pierre Melville, Jacques Becker, Marcel Camus and Christian-Jaque. Silberman proposed that the two make an adaptation of Octave Mirbeau's The Diary of a Chambermaid, which Buñuel had read several times. Buñuel wanted to do the filming in Mexico with Pinal, but Silberman insisted it be done in France.

Pinal was so determined to work again with Buñuel that she was ready to move to France, learn the language and even work for nothing in order to get the part of Célestine, the title character. Silberman, however, wanted French actress Jeanne Moreau to play the role, so he put Pinal off by telling her that Moreau, too, was willing to act with no fee. Ultimately, Silberman got his way, leaving Pinal so disappointed that she was later to claim that Alatriste's failure to help her secure this part led to the breakup of their marriage. When Buñuel requested a French-speaking writer with whom to work on the screenplay, Silberman suggested the 32-year-old Jean-Claude Carrière, an actor whose previous screenwriting credits included only a few films for the comic star/director Pierre Étaix, but once Buñuel learned that Carrière was the heir to a wine-growing family, the newcomer was hired on the spot. At first, Carrière found it difficult to work with Buñuel, because the young man was so deferential that he never challenged any of Buñuel's ideas, until, at Buñuel's covert insistence, Silberman told Carrière to stand up to Buñuel now and then; as Carrière was later to say: "In a way, Buñuel needed an opponent. He didn't need a secretary – he needed someone to contradict him and oppose him and to make suggestions." The finished 1964 film, Diary of a Chambermaid, became the first of several to be made by the team of Buñuel, Carrière and Silberman. Carrière later said "Without me and without Serge Silberman, the producer, perhaps Buñuel would not have made so many films after he was 65. We really encouraged him to work. That's for sure." This was the second filmed version of Mirbeau's novel, the first being a 1946 Hollywood production directed by Jean Renoir, which Buñuel refused to view for fear of being influenced by the famous French director, whom he venerated. Buñuel's version, while admired by many, has often been compared unfavorably to Renoir's, with a number of critics claiming that Renoir's Diary fits better in Renoir's overall oeuvre, while Buñuel's Diary is not sufficiently "Buñuelian".

After the 1964 release of Diary, Buñuel again tried to make a film of Matthew Lewis's The Monk, a project on which he had worked, on and off, since 1938, according to producer Pierre Braunberger. He and Carrière wrote a screenplay, but were unable to obtain funding, which was realized in 1973 under the direction of Buñuel devotee Ado Kyrou, with considerable assistance from both Buñuel and Carrière.

In 1965, Buñuel managed to work again with Silvia Pinal in what was his last Mexican feature, co-starring Claudio Brook, Simón del desierto. Pinal was keenly interested in continuing to work with Buñuel, trusting him completely and frequently stating that he brought out the best in her; however, this was their last collaboration.

=== 1966–1983: Acclaim and final films ===
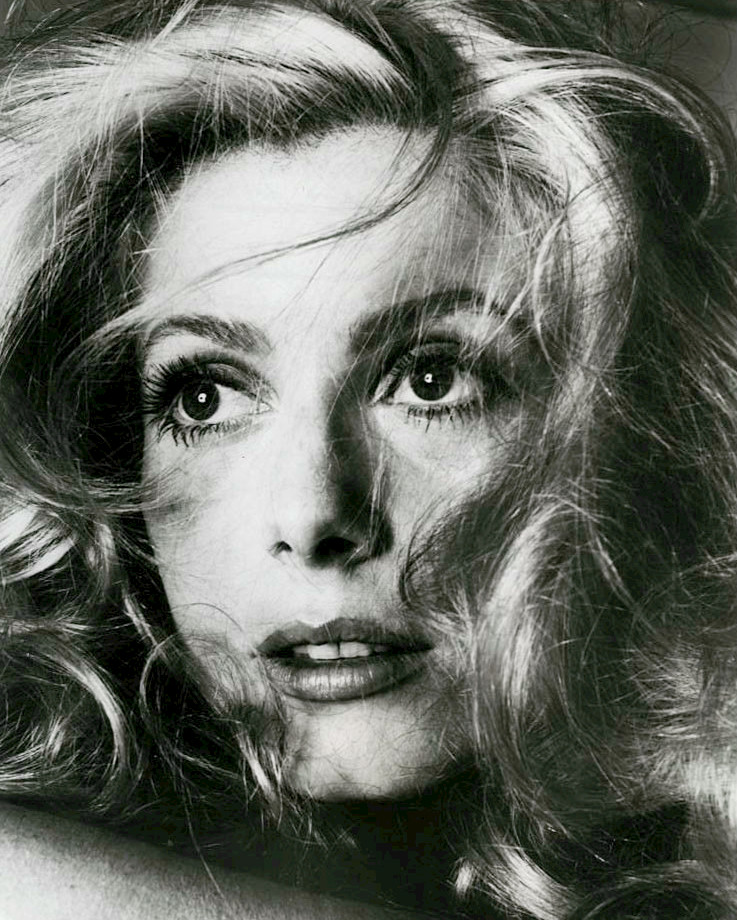
Speaking of Buñuel's deafness, actress Catherine Deneuve, star of Belle de Jour (1967) and Tristana (1970), said: "Well, I think it was difficult for him, coping with his deafness. Some people said he was not that deaf, but I think, when you don't hear very well and when you're tired, everything sinks into a buzz, and it is very hard. French is not his language, so on Belle de Jour, I'm sure that it was much more of an effort for him to have to explain."

In 1966, Buñuel was contacted by Robert and Raymond Hakim, Egyptian-French producers who specialized in sexy films directed by star filmmakers, who offered him the opportunity to direct a film version of Joseph Kessel's novel, about an affluent young woman who leads a double life as a prostitute, and that had caused a scandal upon its publication in 1928. Buñuel did not like Kessel's novel, considering it "a bit of a soap opera", but he took on the challenge because: "I found it interesting to try to turn something I didn't like into something I did." So he and Carrière set out enthusiastically to interview women in the brothels of Madrid to learn about their sexual fantasies. Buñuel also was not happy about the choice of the 22-year-old Catherine Deneuve for the title role, feeling that she had been foisted upon him by the Hakim brothers and Deneuve's lover at the time, director François Truffaut. As a result, both actress and director found working together difficult, with Deneuve claiming, "I felt they showed more of me than they'd said they were going to. There were moments when I felt totally used. I was very unhappy," and Buñuel deriding her prudery on the set. Roger Ebert described it as "possibly the best-known erotic film of modern times, perhaps the best", even though, as another critic has written, "in terms of explicit sexual activity, there is little in Belle de jour we might not see in a Doris Day comedy from the same year". It was Buñuel's most successful film at the box office.

Critics have noted Buñuel's habit of following up a commercial or critical success with a more personal, idiosyncratic film. After the worldwide success of Belle de Jour, and upon viewing Jean-Luc Godard's film La Chinoise, Buñuel, who had wanted to make a film about Catholic heresies for years, told Carrière: "If that is what today's cinema is like, then we can make a film about heresies." The two spent months researching Catholic history and created the 1969 film The Milky Way, a "picaresque road film" that tells the story of two vagabonds on pilgrimage to the tomb of the Apostle James at Santiago de Compostela, during which they travel through time and space to take part in situations illustrating heresies that arose from the six major Catholic dogmas. Vincent Canby compared it to George Stevens's blockbuster The Greatest Story Ever Told, in that Buñuel had made a film about Jesus casting nearly all the famous French performers of the time in cameo roles. The Milky Way was banned in Italy, only to have the Catholic Church intervene on its behalf.

A few great directors have the ability to draw us into their dream world, into their personalities and obsessions and fascinate us with them for a short time. This is the highest level of escapism the movies can provide for us – just as our elementary identification with a hero or a heroine was the lowest.

— Film critic Roger Ebert, on Tristana

Tristana (1970) is a film about a young woman who is seduced and manipulated by her guardian, who attempts to thwart her romance with a young artist and who eventually induces her to marry him after she loses one of her legs due to a tumor. It has been considered by scholar Beth Miller the least understood of Buñuel's films, and consequently one of the most underrated, due to a "consistent failure to apprehend its political and, especially, its socialist-feminist statement". Buñuel had wanted to make a film of Benito Pérez Galdós's novel Tristana as early as 1952, even though he considered Galdós's book the author's weakest. After finishing Viridiana and in the wake of the scandal its release caused in 1962, the Spanish censor turned down this project, and Buñuel had to wait for 8 years before he could receive backing from the Spanish production company Época Films. The censors had threatened to deny permission for the film on the grounds that it encouraged dueling, so Buñuel had to approach the subject matter very gingerly, in addition to making concessions to his French/Italian/Spanish producers, who insisted on casting two of the three primary roles with actors not of Buñuel's choosing: Franco Nero and Catherine Deneuve. On this occasion, however, Deneuve and Buñuel had a more mutually satisfactory working relationship, with Deneuve telling an interviewer, "but in the end, you know, it was actually rather a wonderful shoot. Tristana is one of my favorite films. Personally, as an actress, I prefer Tristana to Belle de Jour."

The idea for their next film, The Discreet Charm of the Bourgeoisie (1972) came from Buñuel and Silberman discussing uncanny repetition in everyday life; Silberman told an anecdote about how he had invited some friends for dinner at his house, only to forget about it, so that, on the night of the dinner party, he was absent and his wife was in her nightclothes. The film tells of a group of affluent friends who are continually stymied in their attempts to eat a meal together, a situation that a number of critics have contrasted to the opposite dilemma of the characters in The Exterminating Angel, where guests of a dinner party are mysteriously unable to leave after having completed their meal. For this film, Buñuel, Silberman and Carrière assembled a top-flight cast of European performers, "a veritable rogues' gallery of French art-house cinema", according to one critic. For the first time, Buñuel made use of a video-playback monitor, which allowed him to make much more extensive use of crane shots and elaborate tracking shots, and enabled him to cut the film in the camera and eliminate the need for reshoots. Filming required only two months and Buñuel claimed that editing took only one day. Silberman decided to skip the Cannes Festival in order to concentrate on getting it nominated for the Academy Award for Best Foreign Language Film, which it won, leading Buñuel to express his contempt for a process that relied on the judgment of "2500 idiots, including for example the assistant dress designer of the studio".

Buñuel took advantage of the popular success of Discreet Charm to make one of the "puzzling, idiosyncratic films he really wanted to make". In 1973, at the Monastery of Paular in the Spanish Somosierra, he wrote the screenplay for The Phantom of Liberty (1974) with Carrière for production by Silberman and his Hollywood partners. The resulting film is a series of 12 distinctive episodes with separate protagonists, linked together only by following a character from one episode to another in a relay-race manner. Buñuel has stated that he made the film as a tribute to poet Benjamin Péret, a founding member of French Surrealism, and called it his "most Surrealist film".

Buñuel's final film, That Obscure Object of Desire (1977), was adapted by Buñuel and Carrière from an 1898 novel by Pierre Louÿs called La Femme et le pantin, which had already been used as the basis of films directed by Josef von Sternberg (The Devil Is a Woman, 1935) and Julien Duvivier (La Femme et le Pantin, 1959). The film, which tells the story of an older man who is obsessed by a young woman who continually evades his attempts to consummate a sexual relationship, starred the Spanish actor Fernando Rey, appearing in his fourth Buñuel film. Initially, the part of the young woman was to be played by Maria Schneider, who had achieved international fame for her roles in Last Tango in Paris and The Passenger, but once shooting started, according to Carrière, her drug usage resulted in a "lackluster and dull" performance that caused tempestuous arguments with Buñuel on the set and her eventual dismissal. Silberman, the producer, decided to abandon the project at that point, but was convinced by Buñuel to continue shooting with two different actresses, Ángela Molina and Carole Bouquet, playing the same role in alternating sequences throughout the film. In his autobiography, Buñuel claimed that this unusual casting decision was his own idea after drinking two dry martinis, saying: "If I had to list all the benefits derived from alcohol, it would be endless". Others have reported that Carrière had first broached the idea while developing the film's scenario, but had been brushed off by Buñuel as "the whim of a rainy day".

After the release of That Obscure Object of Desire, Buñuel retired from filmmaking. In 1982, he wrote (along with Carrière) his autobiography, Mon Dernier Soupir (translated as My Last Sigh in the U.S., My Last Breath in the UK), which provides an account of his life, friends and family as well as a representation of his eccentric personality. In it, he recounts dreams, encounters with many well-known writers, actors and artists such as Pablo Picasso and Charlie Chaplin as well as antics, like dressing up as a nun and walking around town.

== Personal life ==
Luis waited for death for a long time, like a good Spaniard, and when he died he was ready. His relationship with death was like that one has with a woman. He felt the love, hate, tenderness, ironical detachment of a long relationship, and he didn't want to miss the last encounter, the moment of union. "I hope I will die alive," he told me. At the end it was as he had wished. His last words were "I'm dying".

— Long-time friend and collaborator, Jean-Claude Carrière

Starting at age 17, Buñuel steadily dated the future poet and dramatist Concha Méndez, with whom he vacationed every summer at San Sebastián. He introduced her to his friends at the Residencia as his fiancée. After five years, she broke off the relationship, citing Buñuel's "insufferable character". Fetishism, especially of feet, is a theme in his work. Pauline Kael wrote "That was a wonderful afternoon little Luis spent on the floor of his mother’s closet, and he has never allowed us to forget it."

During his student years, Buñuel became an accomplished hypnotist. He claimed that once, while calming a hysterical prostitute through hypnotic suggestion, he inadvertently put one of the several bystanders into a trance as well. He was often to insist that watching movies was a form of hypnosis: "This kind of cinematographic hypnosis is no doubt due to the darkness of the theatre and to the rapidly changing scenes, lights, and camera movements, which weaken the spectator's critical intelligence and exercise over him a kind of fascination." Referring to Buñuel's interest in hypnosis, Anthony Lane wrote, "You can easily picture yourself being hypnotized by this man; sit through a sample of his movies, and you will think you have been."

=== Marriage ===
In 1926 he met his future wife, Jeanne Rucar Lefebvre, a gymnastics teacher who had won a bronze medal at the 1924 Paris Olympics. Buñuel courted her in a formal Aragonese manner, complete with a chaperone, and they married in 1934 despite a warning by Jean Epstein when Buñuel first proposed in 1930: "Jeanne, you are making a mistake.... It's not right for you, don't marry him." The two remained married throughout his life and had two sons, Juan Luis and Rafael. Diego Buñuel, filmmaker and host of the National Geographic Channel's Don't Tell My Mother series, is their grandson.

=== Illness and death ===
In his 70s, Buñuel once told his friend, novelist Carlos Fuentes: "I'm not afraid of death. I'm afraid of dying alone in a hotel room, with my bags open and a shooting script on the night table. I must know whose fingers will close my eyes." In his autobiography, My Last Sigh, he wrote, "I'd love to rise from the grave every ten years or so and go buy a few newspapers. Ghostly pale, sliding silently along the walls, my paper under my arm, I'd return to the cemetery and read about all the disasters in the world before falling back to sleep, safe and secure in my tomb."

According to his wife, Jeanne, Buñuel died in Mexico City in 1983 from diabetes complications. Fuentes has recounted that Buñuel spent his last week in hospital discussing theology with the Jesuit brother Julián Pablo Fernández, a long time friend. His funeral was very private, involving only family and close friends, among them poets Octavio Paz and Homero Aridjis. He died on the same day as David Niven and Raymond Massey

== Style, themes and influences ==
Buñuel's technique of made distinct use of mise-en-scène, sound editing and music. The influences on his filmmaking have included a positive relationship to surrealism and a critical approach to atheism and religion. Buñuel's style of directing was extremely economical; he shot films in a few weeks, rarely deviating from his script (the scene in Tristana where Catherine Deneuve exposes her breasts to Saturno – but not the audience – being a noted exception) and shooting as much as possible in order to minimize editing time. He remained true throughout his working life to an operating philosophy that he articulated at the beginning of his career in 1928: "The guiding idea, the silent procession of images that are concrete, decisive, measured in space and time—in a word, the film—was first projected inside the brain of the filmmaker". In this, Buñuel has been compared with Alfred Hitchcock, another director famous for precision, efficiency and preplanning, for whom actually shooting the film was an anticlimax, because both knew, in Buñuel's words, "exactly how each scene will be shot and what the final montage will be". Per Jeanne Moreau, "He was the only director I know who never threw away a shot. He had the film in his mind. When he said 'action' and 'cut,' you knew that what was in between the two would be printed."

Buñuel is often cited as an auteur; Ingmar Bergman once wrote "Buñuel nearly always made Buñuel films". Despite his variety, John Huston believed that, regardless of genre, a Buñuel film is so distinctive as to be instantly recognizable. Writer Octavio Paz called Buñuel's work "the marriage of the film image to the poetic image, creating a new reality...scandalous and subversive". Ebert writes "None of his films is lacking a cheerfully sardonic view of human nature. His object is always dry humor. Even when he was working for Hollywood studios, recycling the sets and costumes of English-language pictures into Spanish versions of the same screenplays, or later simply dubbing them into Spanish, he slyly slipped in a few touches that were lacking in the sources. He is one of the great originals, creator of satirical delight." David Thomson names him one of the greatest directors, adding "He is as intent on comedy as Kafka was, as little intent on showing off style, and as much a victim as the joke he tells."

== Retrospectives ==
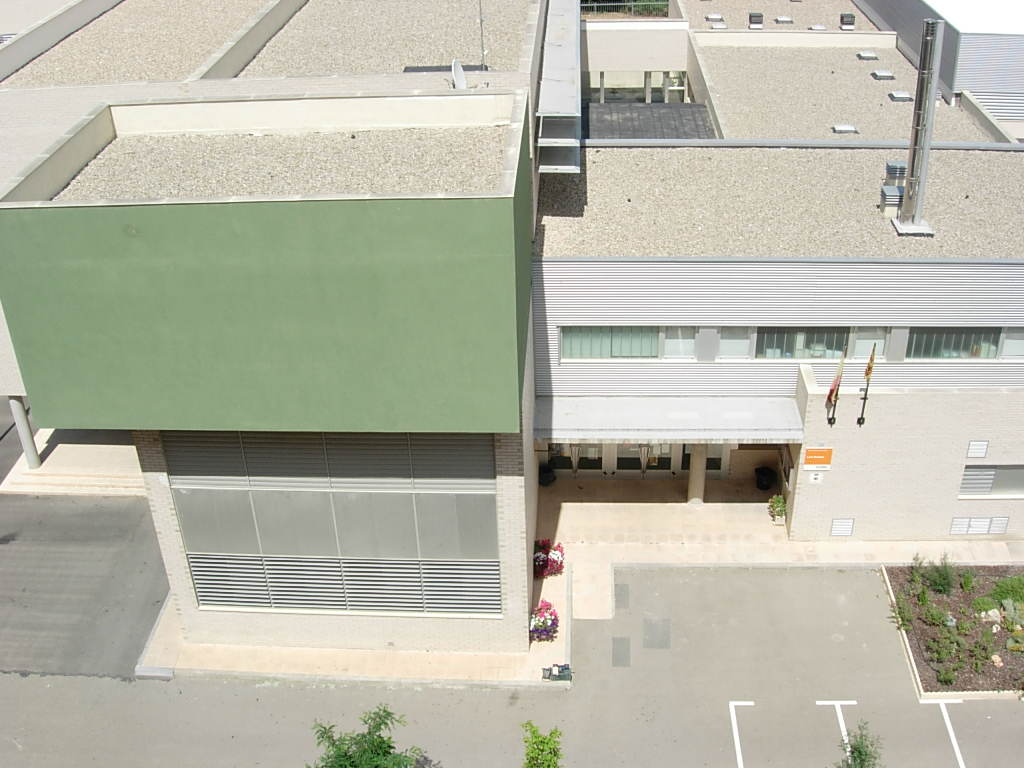
Instituto de Educación Secundaria (IES) Luis Buñuel, Zaragoza, Spain

- In 1994, a retrospective of Buñuel's works was organized by the Kunst- und Ausstellungshalle in Bonn, as homage to one of the most internationally revered figures in world cinema. This was followed in the summer of 1996 by a commemoration of the centenary of the birth of cinema held by the Museo Nacional Centro de Arte Reina Sofía in Madrid, which included a unique retrospective, jointly sponsored by the King of Spain and the President of Mexico, called ¿Buñuel!. La mirada del siglo, honoring his special status as Spanish cinema's most emblematic figure.
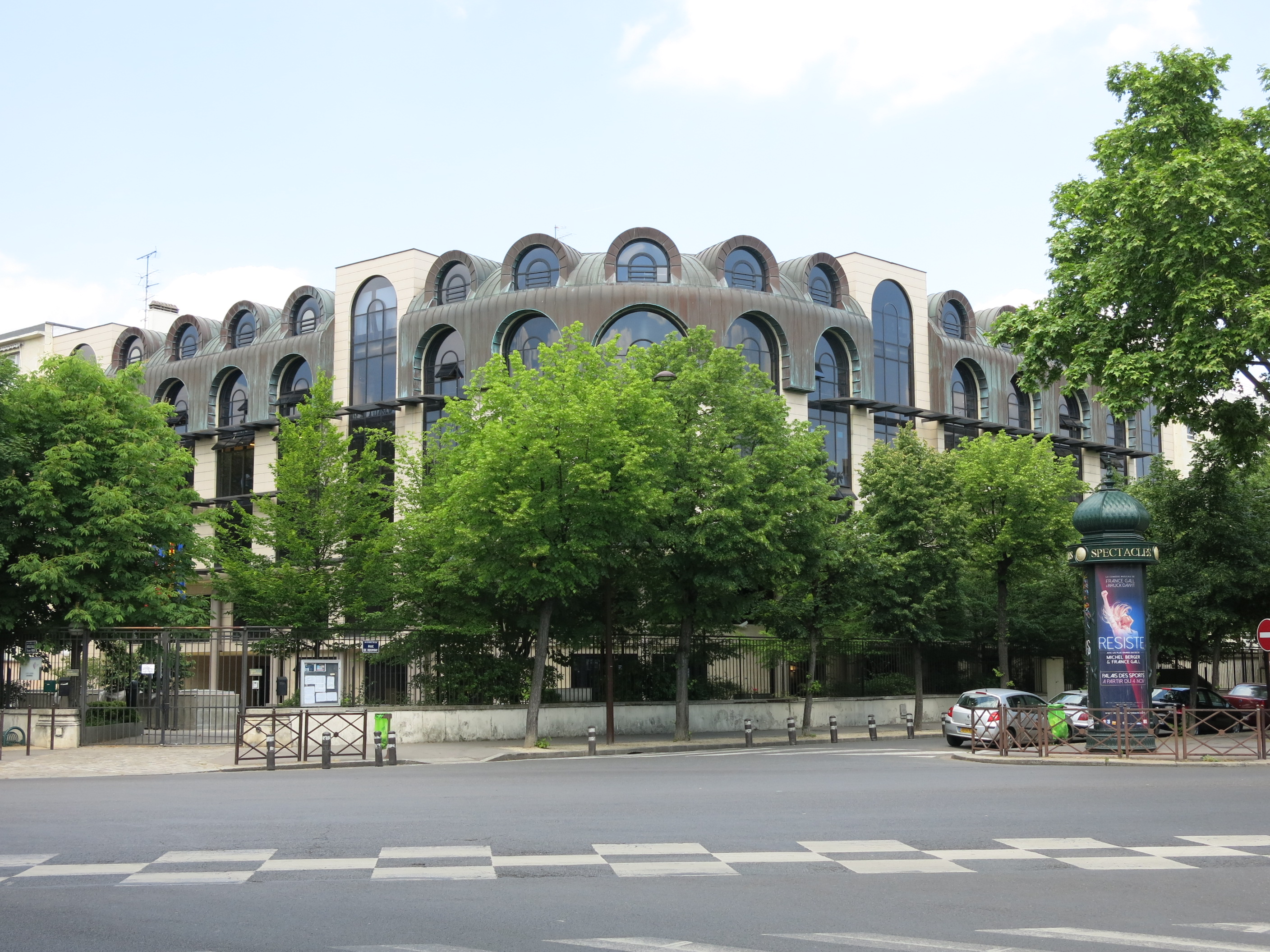
  Liceo Español Luis Buñuel
- A secondary school in Zaragoza, Spain has been named for Buñuel: Instituto de Educación Secundaria Ies Luis Buñuel. Liceo Español Luis Buñuel, a Spanish international school, is in Neuilly-sur-Seine, France, near Paris.
- In Calanda, Spain a bust of the head of Luis Buñuel is on display at the Centro Buñuel Calanda (CBC), a museum devoted to the director. The mission of the CBC is to serve as a reference center both for connoisseurs of Buñuel and for anyone interested in the arts of Aragon.
- One of the main theatres at the Palais des Festivals et des Congrès, where the Cannes Film Festival is held, is named after him: Salle Buñuel.
- To mark the centenary of his birth, in 2000 the Cannes festival partnered with the Spanish film industry, to pay tribute to Luis Buñuel. This tribute consisted of three events: (1) the inauguration, for Cannes 2000, of the Palace's new Luis Buñuel room, (2) an original exhibition organized by Instituto de la Cinematografía y de las Artes Audiovisuales entitled "The Secret World of Buñuel", and (3) an exceptional projection of Viridiana, the Palme d'Or winner in 1961, in the presence of specially invited artists.
- The Luis Buñuel Film Institute (LBFI) is housed in the Downtown Independent Theatre, Los Angeles, and has as its mission: "to form the vital and innovative arena for the promotion of the work of Luis Buñuel, and a seminal resource for the development of new research, knowledge and scholarship on his life and work, extending across his body of films and writings".
- The International Museum of Surgical Science in Chicago hosts an exhibit between August 2025 and February 2026 titled Buñuel: Master of Dreams. On 2 November, the cremains of Buñuel will be flown from Los Angeles to Chicago and unveiled for members of the public to make offerings in accordance with the traditions of the Mexican holiday Day of the Dead.

== Awards, influence and legacy ==
Buñuel was given the Career Golden Lion in 1982 by the Venice Film Festival and the FIPRESCI Prize – Honorable Mention in 1969 by the Berlin International Film Festival. In 1977, he received the National Prize for Arts and Sciences for Fine Arts. At the 11th Moscow International Film Festival in 1979, he was awarded the Honorable Prize for his contribution to cinema. He was nominated twice for the Nobel Prize in Literature in 1968 and 1972. Fifteen of his films are included in the They Shoot Pictures, Don't They? list of the 1,000 greatest films of all time, second only to Jean-Luc Godard, with sixteen, and he ranks number 13 on their list of the top 250 directors.

He has influenced directors such as Woody Allen, Godfrey Reggio, Aki Kaurismäki, Gaspar Noé, Yorgos Lanthimos, Wes Anderson, and Jonathan Glazer.

Documentaries about Buñuel

- Dans l'oeil de Luis Buñuel. France, 2013, 54 min., book and director: François Lévy-Kuentz, Producer: KUIV Productions, arte France.
- El último guión – Buñuel en la memoria. Spain, Germany, France, 2008, 45 min., Book and director: Javier Espada und Gaizka Urresti, Producer: Imval Producciones
- Tras Nazarín (Following Nazarín). Spain/Mexico, 2015. Directed by Javier Espada. Ircania Producciones. Utilizes still photos taken by Buñuel and Manuel Álvarez Bravo to link the images of the film to the Mexican countryside. Includes interviews with Jean Claude Carrière, Ignacio López Tarso, Silvia Pinal, Arturo Ripstein and Carlos Reygadas, along with critics and film scholars.

== In popular culture ==
Buñuel has been portrayed as a character in many films and television productions:

- A portion of Juan Antonio Bardem's mini-series Lorca, muerte de un poeta (1987–1988), recreates the student years of Buñuel, Lorca and Dalí, with Fernando Valverde portraying Buñuel in two episodes.
- He was played by Dimiter Guerasimof in Antoni Ribas's biopic Dalí (1991), despite the fact that Dalí and his attorney had written to Ribas objecting to the project in its early stages in 1985.
- Buñuel appeared as a character in Alejandro Pelayo's film Miroslava (1993), based on the life of actress Miroslava Stern, who committed suicide after appearing in Ensayo de un crimen (1955).
- Buñuel was played by three actors, El Gran Wyoming (old age), Pere Arquillué (young adult) and Juan Carlos Jiménez Marín (child), in Carlos Saura's 2001 fantasy, Buñuel y la mesa del rey Salomón, which tells of Buñuel, Lorca and Dalí setting out in search of the mythical table of King Salomón, which is thought to have the power to see into the past, the present and the future.
- Buñuel was a character in a 2001 television miniseries Severo Ochoa: La conquista de un Nobel, on the life of the Spanish émigré and Nobel laureate in medicine, who was also at the Residencia de Estudiantes during Buñuel's time there.
- Matt Lucas portrayed Buñuel in Richard Curson Smith's 2002 TV movie Surrealissimo: The Scandalous Success of Salvador Dalí, a comedy depicting Dalí's "trial" by the Surrealists in 1934 for his pro-Hitler sympathies.
- Delaney Bishop's short The Death of Salvador Dali (2005) contains sequences in which Buñuel appears, played by Alejandro Cardenas.
- Paul Morrison's Little Ashes hypothesizes a love affair between Dalí and Lorca, with Buñuel (Matthew McNulty) looking on suspiciously.
- Buñuel, (Adrien de Van), is one of many notable personalities in Woody Allen's Midnight in Paris (2011).
- In 2019, Fermín Solís published a graphic novel titled Buñuel en el Laberinto de las Tortugas (English translation, 2021: Buñuel in the Labyrinth of the Turtles) depicting the creation of Las Hurdes: Tierra Sin Pan.
- An animated film of the book was released in 2019, directed by Salvador Simó.
- Buñuel's The Exterminating Angel (1962) and The Discreet Charm of the Bourgeoisie (1972) were adapted into a musical by Stephen Sondheim and David Ives, Here We Are (2023) which premiered at The Shed in New York City.

== See also ==
- Art film
- Cinema of Mexico
- Cinema of Spain
- Experimental film
- Surrealist cinema
- List of Spanish Academy Award winners and nominees
- List of Mexican Academy Award winners and nominees
- List of atheists in film, radio, television and theater
- List of banned films
