= Contes cruels =

- Volume I cover
- Author: Octave Mirbeau
- Original title: Contes cruels
- Language: French
- Genre: Short stories
- Publisher: Librairie Séguier
- Publication date: 1990
- Publication place: France

Contes cruels (Cruel Tales) is a two-volume set of about 150 tales and short stories by the 19th-century French writer Octave Mirbeau, collected and edited by Pierre Michel and Jean-François Nivet and published in two volumes in 1990 by Librairie Séguier. The title was taken from Auguste Villiers de l'Isle-Adam, of whom Mirbeau was a friend and admirer.

== Publication ==
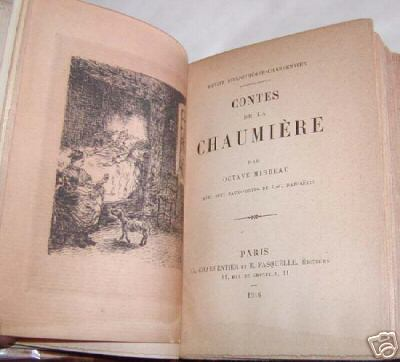
Contes de la chaumière, 1894

All these stories appeared in the major daily newspapers of the era. Only a small number were published by the author himself in Lettres de ma chaumière and Contes de ma chaumière. Others – significantly more numerous – were published in various small books and collections after the author's death by his widow, Alice Regnault: in La Pipe de cidre, La Vache tachetée, Un homme sensible, Chez l'Illustre écrivain, Le Petit Gardeur de vache, and Un gentilhomme. A few others, notably translated into German, Spanish, and Russian, were published abroad.

Anxious to profit from all of his literary output, Mirbeau reused a number of the stories that had already appeared in the French press by inserting them into his patchwork novel Les Vingt et un Jours d'un neurasthénique.

== The Subversion of the story ==
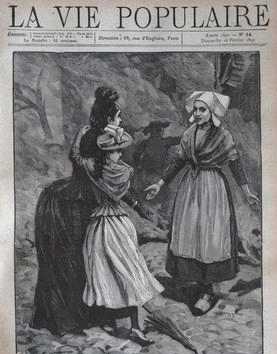
Octave Mirbeau, "Le Nid de frelons", La Vie populaire, 16 February 1890

It is apparent that the novelist accorded little interest to a task which, in his eyes, served primarily to put food on the table. Indeed, at the time, the short story occupied an important place in the press, and along with the chronicle, was a genre particularly favored by the public, permitting most writers to earn their living more dependably than was possible through the publication of their books. The daily papers could thereby secure the fidelity of their readers by offering them a bit of entertainment and by allowing them to experience a modicum of cheer and emotion.

Mirbeau saw in the story a valuable opportunity to expand his literary range, by treating subjects and sketching out characters and settings that he intended to develop more fully in subsequent novels.

== Universal suffering ==
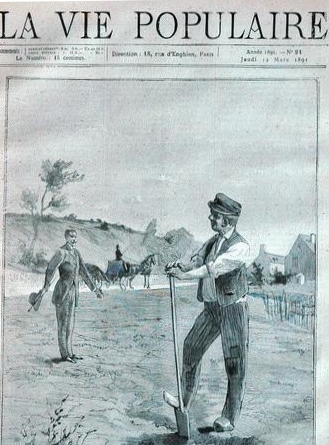
Octave Mirbeau, "Le Rebouteux", La Vie populaire, 12 March 1891

Mirbeau privileged the themes of the tragic nature of the human condition, the « horror of being a man », suffering coextensive with human existence, and the sadism, homicidal impulses, and the « law of murder », on which society is founded. In his short stories, Mirbeau also addresses the failure of communication between the sexes, the derisory, larval existence of people dehumanized by an oppressive and alienating society. Before Le Jardin des supplices , Mirbeau draws up an inventory of the evidence of human ignominy and universal suffering: « Man drags himself - Mirbeau writes - panting, from torture to agony, from the nothingness of life to the nothingness of death ».

== Demystification ==
Filled as they are with references to current events, Mirbeau's stories complement his journalistic chronicles. In these works, Mirbeau devotes himself to contesting the legitimacy of all social institutions and to attacking all forms of social evil encountered in the fin-de-siècle: clericalism that poisons one's soul, nationalism that drives one to crime, the vengefulness of war, murderous anti-Semitism, genocidal colonialism, the cynicism of politicians who dupe their constituents, the sadism of pro-war agitators, the wretchedness of the urban and rural proletariat, prostitution, the exploitation of the poor and their social exclusion. Far from being merely a harmless derivative, Mirbeau's Contes cruels constitute a genuine attempt at demystification.
