= Combats littéraires =

2006 collection of writing by Octave Mirbeau

- Author: Octave Mirbeau
- Original title: Combats littéraires
- Language: French
- Subject: literature
- Genre: essays
- Publisher: L'Age d'Homme, Lausanne
- Publication date: 2006
- Publication place: France

Combats littéraires is the title of a 2006 collection of 187 articles and prefaces written by the French writer Octave Mirbeau, between 1876 and 1916, on literature, journalism, and publishing over the course of his long career as an influential journalist. Although Mirbeau collaborated with numerous daily newspapers, he was never officially assigned the work of literary reviewer. Of these articles, some 60 were published between 1925 and 1926 under the title Les Écrivains, and these are available on Wikisource.

== Eclectic Criticism ==
Even if certain articles by the author of Les affaires sont les affaires (Business is business) bestow praise on Émile Zola, toward whom Mirbeau was not otherwise so kindly disposed, and on Edmond de Goncourt, they evidence an aesthetic that is overtly hostile to naturalism, considered by Mirbeau to be one of the century's gravest errors in matters of art.

Mirbeau demonstrates eclectic taste, expressing appreciation for such authors as Léon Bloy and Maurice Maeterlinck, Leo Tolstoy and Oscar Wilde, Jules Barbey d'Aurevilly and Anna de Noailles, Léon Daudet and Charles-Louis Philippe, Jules Laforgue, and Léon Werth or Marguerite Audoux. In Mirbeau's eyes, they all had the merit of showing people and things in a new light and of having a style that was uniquely personal.

However, Mirbeau was well aware that, in a conformist bourgeois society, and under a capitalist economy whose sole object was profit, journalism and publishing were becoming increasingly contaminated, serving only as an instrument for besotting the masses. Good literature, Mirbeau believed, was incompatible with the prevailing trend toward mercantilism and publicity, and so its impact could only be limited. Mirbeau harbored no illusion about writers' ability to change the world.

== A Realm of struggle ==
Literature, for Mirbeau, was contested terrain, as were the social issues for which he campaigned, and while he rejected the discredited function of literary critic, he played in the realm of literature, as he did in the domain of the fine arts, the role of intercessor, promoter, and discoverer.

== Quotations ==
- « In art, exactness means deformation, and truth means falsehood. In literature, there is nothing that is absolutely true, or, rather, there exist as many human truths as there are individuals. » (Nov. 3, 1884).
- « It is no longer a matter of creating a beautiful work; instead, it is necessary to know how to organize a beautiful publicity campaign. » (May 11, 1889)
- « The public wants love and only love, and writers are forced to sell it. They dispense it in boxes, bags, decanters, and bottles. If literature has remained behind the sciences in the ascent toward the conquest of ideas, it is because it is hungrier for immediate success and for money. Literature has been more inclined to embody the routines, vices, and ignorance of a public that wishes to be lulled and duped with stories of another world. » (July 25, 1890).
- « There is no need, I believe, to understand everything in art. There are dark, harmonious, and sonorous things that envelop you in a mystery that it is wrong to illumine. Since we do not understand life, why wish to understand everything in what paraphrases it? » (January 1893).
- « Today action must take refuge in books. Only in books – disengaged from the multiple and sickly contingencies that stifle and destroy it – does action find the proper terrain in which to cultivate the ideas it sows. Ideas remain and multiply. Once sowed, they germinate. After germinating, they flower. And humanity comes to pick these flowers, making bouquets of joy for its future deliverance. » (March 11, 1895).
