= Dingo (novel) =

1913 novel by Octave Mirbeau

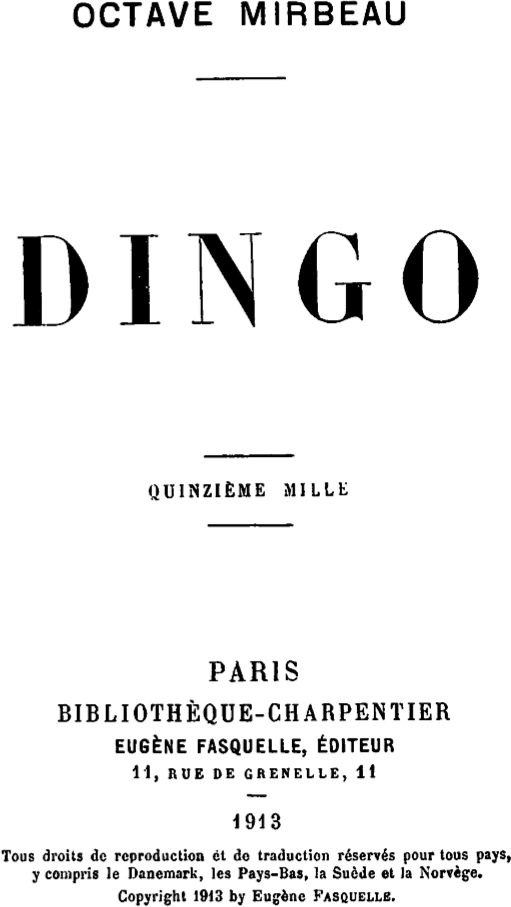
- Author: Octave Mirbeau
- Original title: 'Dingo'
- Language: French
- Genre: Novel
- Publisher: Fasquelle
- Publication date: 1913
- Publication place: France

Dingo is a 1913 novel by the French novelist and playwright Octave Mirbeau.

== Plot summary ==
Completed by Mirbeau's long-time friend Léon Werth, when the author's ill health prevented him from writing the concluding chapters, Dingo, Mirbeau's final novel, appeared in completed form with Fasquelle in 1913. An autobiographical fiction, Mirbeau's tale chronicles the author's adventures with his pet dog Dingo while simultaneously offering a jaundiced view of country life, in Ponteilles-en-Barcis, a squalid town modeled on the village of Cormeilles-en-Vexin, where Mirbeau had the misfortune to reside.

== Commentary ==
Carrying on in the same vein as La 628-E8, in which the hero of the novel had been Mirbeau's automobile, Dingo again takes a non-human as its central character, the marauding, untamed creature that assumes mythical proportions in Mirbeau's book. Uncorrupted by social institutions, endowed with animal good sense, Dingo exposes the vices, duplicity, and venality of the local autochthons while also instructing his "master" in the virtue of living in harmony with the instincts.

Despite praising his dog, Mirbeau offers an unromanticized image of the predatory beast, whose displays of goodness and affection are offset by murderous rampages, his wholesale slaughter of sheep and chickens. Herein Mirbeau shows that man and animal alike obey the "law of murder", whose operation Mirbeau had described in Le Jardin des supplices (Torture Garden).

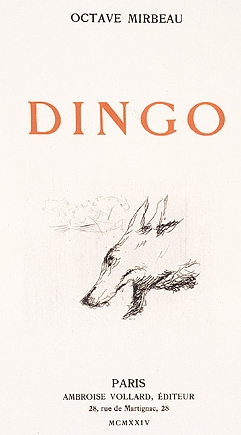
Dingo, Ambroise Vollard Éditeur, 1924

Decentering the masterful human subject who acts as a confident narrator, Mirbeau's novel shows how completely he had broken with the conventions of realist fiction.
