= Clara (Mirbeau) =

- The Torture Garden character
- Clara, by Jeannette Seelhoff, 1931
- Created by: Octave Mirbeau

In-universe information
- Gender: Female
- Nationality: English

Clara is the main character in the French novel The Torture Garden (1899) by Octave Mirbeau.

== A free woman ==
Clara, who has no last name or civil status, is an English woman with red hair and green eyes: "a greyish green of the young fruits of the almond tree." Single, rich and bisexual, Clara lives near Canton, and leads an idle existence, entirely devoted to finding perverse pleasures. She is fully emancipated, financially and sexually, and freed from oppressive laws and taboos prevailing in the West and which, according to her critique of anarchist inspiration, prohibit the development of the individual. Clara thus claims to enjoy complete freedom. She particularly enjoys visiting the city prison every week, which is open to tourists on Wednesday. Clara delights in watching the death row inmates, many of whom are innocent or guilty of minor offenses, being brutally tortured and put to death.

This protagonist meets the anonymous narrator, a petty political crook, aboard the Saghalien, where the pseudo-embryologist was sailing to Ceylon, as part of an official mission. In reality, his primary goal is just to distance himself from France. She seduces him, awakening his sexual desire along with the need to unburden himself, and becomes his mistress. She takes him with her to China, where they share a lover, Annie.

Two years later, the narrator, who had fled from Clara's pernicious embraces and gone to Annam, returns. Clara regains her power over him and is pleased to dominate and humiliate him. She takes him to visit the torture garden of the prison, where they wander around. During a crescendo of horror, Clara experiences waves of ecstasy and has a hysterical fit. She then feels almost purified after climaxing. The scene takes place in a "flower boat", a floating brothel, where orgies take place. According to the narrator, the area is more like a place of punishment than a garden of delights. But, as Ki Pai, the boatman who regularly accompanies Clara, says, "It will start all over again!"

== A fantastic and sadistic woman ==
The enigmatic character of Clara, "fairy of mass graves, angel of decomposition and decay", seems to be based on pure fantasy, unrelated to a plausible reality that the novel would be expected to reproduce mimetically, to the point at which the narrator becomes haggard wondering whether she is not a figment of his imagination: "Does she really exist?... I wonder, not without fear... Was she not born out of my debauchery and fever?... Is she like one of those impossible images, like a child in a nightmare? ... A criminal temptation, lust sparking the sick imaginations of murderers and madmen?... Could she be nothing but my soul, escaped outside of my body, despite myself, which materialized in the form of sin?... "

This character is an illustration of a fin-de-siècle femme fatale, an all-powerful ghoul who treats men as puppets and enjoys their humiliation. Sadistic and voyeuristic, she experiences an intense and ever-growing pleasure in viewing sophisticated executions, whose art was perfected by China, as opposed to industrial and technological massacres, which were practiced on a large scale in Europe without any concern for art. As Jean-Luc Planchais wrote, she is a "bloody tribade who castrates ideals", who "believes herself to be God, the destruction of the other confirms her supremacy".

However, she is equally masochistic because she likes to imagine herself in the role of a victim whose suffering is an unparalleled source of ecstasy. For example, when witnessing the "iron rods" torture, she says, "It felt like the rod entered the small of my back with every strike... It was atrocious and very sweet!" Perverse, she is an apologist for "lust" in all its forms and sees it as "the perfection of love" because "all the mental faculties of man are revealed and sharpened" and that "it is only by lust" that can achieve "development total personality. " And it is through lust that she intends to initiate the shy narrator.

This character's perhaps monstrous values and claims seem totally at odds with the humanism of Octave Mirbeau, a defender of Alfred Dreyfus. However, one could make the argument that the novelist was using Clara's character as a means of denouncing English and French colonialism. Readers can only be disconcerted and uncomfortable and may lose their aesthetic and ethical bearings.

== Bibliography ==
- Julia Przybos, « Délices et supplices : Octave Mirbeau et Jérôme Bosch », in Octave Mirbeau, Presses de l’Université d’Angers, 1992, p. 207-216.
- Fabien Soldà, « Du Calvaire au Jardin des supplices : la passion de l'homme », Cahiers Octave Mirbeau, n° 19, 2012, pp. 4–24.
