= Un gentilhomme =

Un gentilhomme is a novel by the French novelist and playwright Octave Mirbeau, published by Flammarion in 1920, after his death. Only three chapters were published.

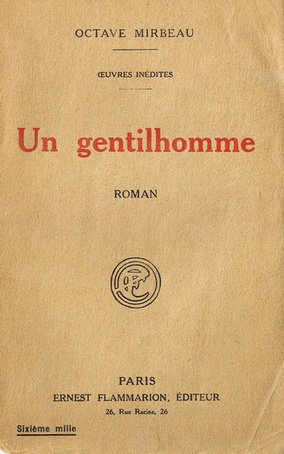
Un gentilhomme, Flammarion, 1920

== An unachievable novel ==
It was in the mid-1890s that Octave Mirbeau first began contemplating work on a novel on a great landowner. In 1900 he had entertained the idea of a book of epic dimensions – like Leo Tolstoy's War and Peace – except set in France in the last quarter of the nineteenth century, beginning at the time of the Marshall Mac-Mahon's "coup d'état" on May 16, 1877. However, the three chapters published by his widow, the former actress Alice Regnault, are discontinued on the eve of the coup...

Apparently, the undertaking that Mirbeau envisaged soon appeared to him to be one that exceeded his capabilities, and also was one that would be at odds with his own evolving views on the novel. Whereas Mirbeau had been increasingly drawn to unconventional plot narratives, disorienting because of their equivocal meaning and lack of linear structure (see Torture Garden and Les Vingt et un Jours d'un neurasthénique), his new project would require him to supply an abundance of explanatory background to contextualize the contemporary history his book was to treat, as if such historical reality was really accessible at all.

== A confession-novel ==
The principal interest of Mirbeau's three completed chapters comes because they refocused the novelist on his own literary origins. Like Mirbeau, his protagonist-narrative, Charles Varnat, enters, as a personal secretary, into the service of a Normand country squire, the Marquis d'Amblezy-Sérac, a man of vast political ambition. Mirbeau's story serves as a pretext for him to return to the years when he himself had been obliged to earn his daily bread by hiring his pen out to a succession of employers.

These experiences had left Mirbeau embittered by memories of his humiliation and frustration. Here again, as in the articles and stories dating from the 1880s, Mirbeau likens the lot of this intellectual proletariat to prostitution, and compares the life of a personal secretary to that of a servant, albeit an even more degraded one.
