= La Mort de Balzac =

La Mort de Balzac (The Death of Balzac) by Octave Mirbeau is a collection of three sub-chapters that were initially intended to appear in Mirbeau's La 628-E8, in November 1907, but were then withdrawn at the last moment at the request of the 80-year daughter of Madame Hanska, the Countess of Mniszech. La Mort de Balzac was published by Pierre Michel and Jean-François Nivet in 1989, in the Editions du Lerot, and then in 1999, in the Editions du Félin. Published at "the expenses of an admirer", in earlier edition, limited to 250 copies, the three sub-chapters had appeared in 1918 under the title Balzac.

English translation : The Death of Balzac, Snuggly Books, 2018, 92 pages. Translated by Brian Stableford.

== A prodigious life ==
This short volume consists of three chapters: "With Balzac", "Balzac’s Wife" and "The Death of Balzac", the last of which ignited a lively scandal.

In the first chapter, the novelist Mirbeau expresses the strongest admiration for Balzac, not only as the author of the epic Human Comedy, but also as an extraordinary man and a marvel of humanity. Certainly, Mirbeau suggests, Balzac could be taxed with weakness, naiveté, and contradictory behavior, but his life was so vast, so tumultuous, and eventful that it could not be measured by the same common standards that were applied to other men's lives. Nor could Balzac be judged by the same moral values or expected to conform to the same social etiquettes as others: "We are obliged to accept, love, and honor him as he was", Mirbeau writes. "Everything about him was prodigious, both his virtues and his vices."

== Double misunderstanding and betrayal ==
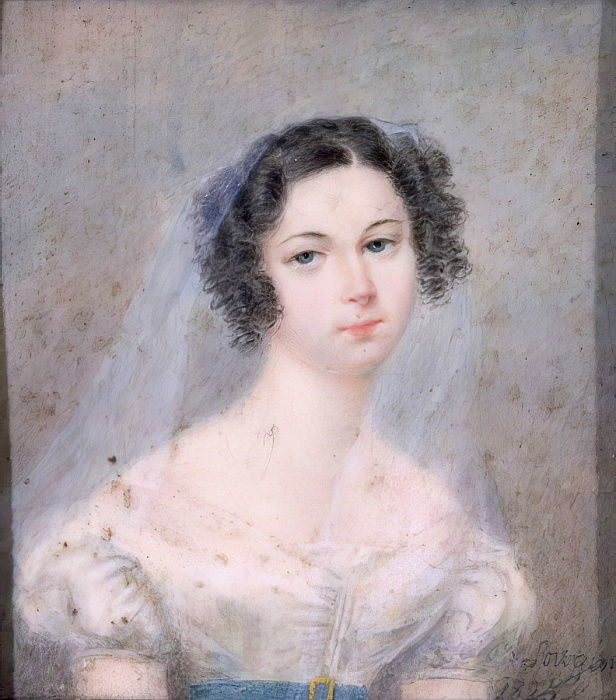
Évelyne Hánska, by Holz Sowgen, 1825

The second chapter traces the history of Balzac's long liaison with Éveline Hanska, highlighting the redhibitory misunderstanding that jeopardized this relationship from the start. A pessimist on the subject of love, which in his eyes, was nothing but a crude and destructive illusion, Octave Mirbeau analyzes the "double misunderstanding" on which the couple's "amatory exaltations" were based and which would ineluctably lead to the downfall of both.

In the third chapter – purporting to draw on the oral account given to him by painter Jean Gigoux in the studio of Auguste Rodin – the author fabricates a counterfeit narrative of Balzac's death agonies. According to this account, Balzac had been left to die in his room where his corpse would rapidly decay, while, in an adjoining room, his faithless wife entertained her lover, Jean Gigoux. Of course, Balzac specialists were scandalized and claimed the author had been slandered. But Mirbeau was hardly concerned with respecting an inaccessible historic “truth”, since what mattered to him was to underscore the impossibility of communication between the two sexes who, in his view, were separated by an insurmountable abyss. Secondarily, through his account of Madame Hanska's infidelity, Mirbeau was able to avenge himself on his own partner, Alice Regnault, who would disgracefully betray the author shortly after his death, as if Mirbeau himself had had a premonition of these events.
