= Sébastien Roch =

Sébastien Roch may refer to:

- Sébastien Roch (novel)
- Sébastien Roch (singer)
