= Marguerite Audoux =

French novelist (1863–1937)

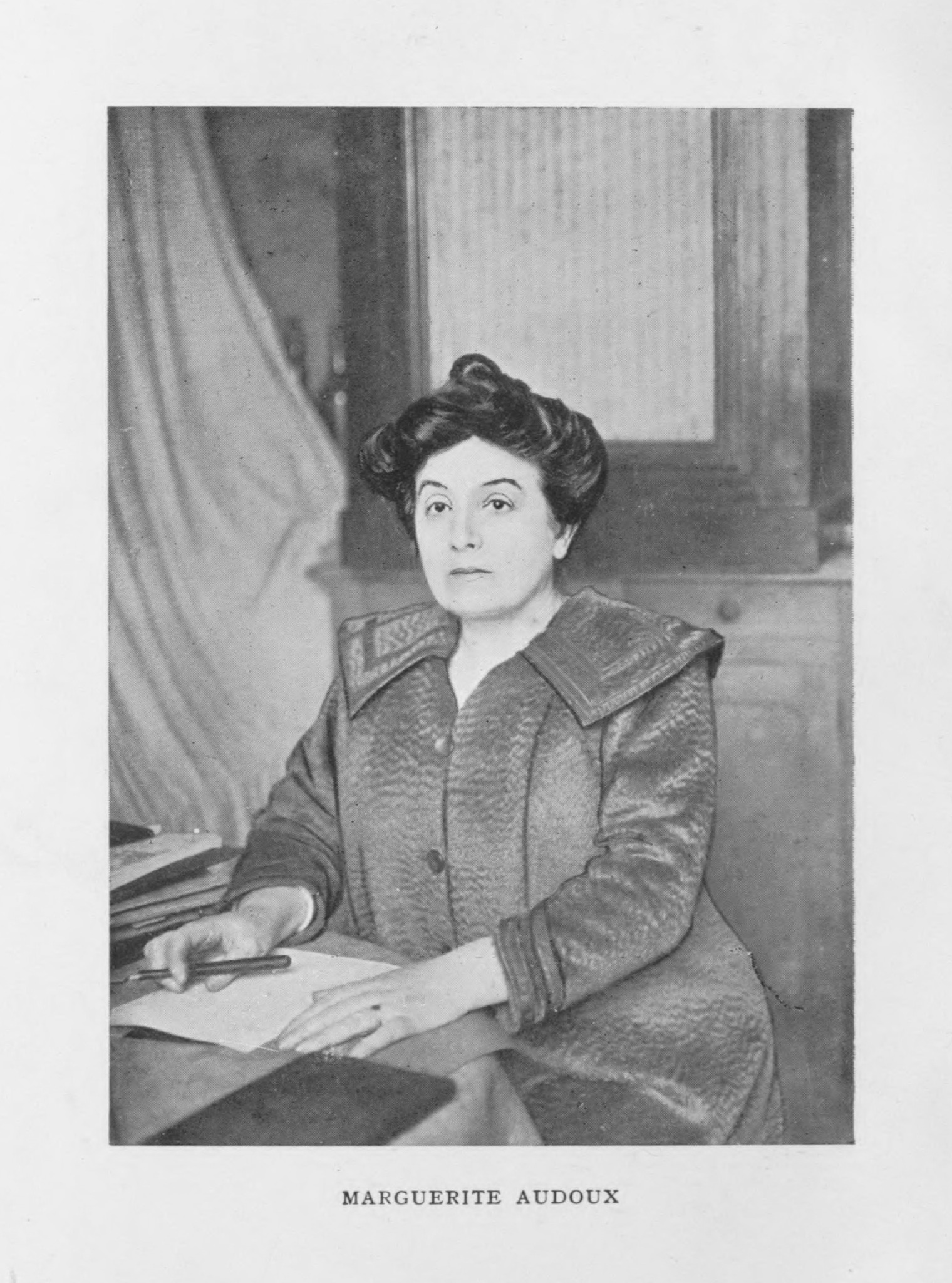
Marguerite Audoux, pictured in the frontispiece of Marie Claire, 1911

Marguerite Audoux (French pronunciation: [maʁɡəʁit odu]; 7 July 1863 in Sancoins, Cher – 31 January 1937 in Saint-Raphaël, Var) was a French novelist.

== Biography ==
Marguerite Donquichote, who took her mother's name, Audoux, in 1895, was orphaned by age three, following the death of her mother and abandonment by her father. She and her sister Madeleine initially lived with an aunt but ultimately spent nine years in the orphanage at Bourges. In 1877, Andoux was put to work as a shepherdess and farm worker in the region of Sologne. There, she fell in love with a local boy, Henri Dejoulx, but his parents would not permit them to marry.

Audoux moved to Paris in 1881. Desperately poor, she found occasional work as a seamstress and made ends meet with whatever menial labour could be found. She bore a stillborn child in 1883; the difficult pregnancy and labour left her permanently sterile.

In Paris, she took custody of her niece, Yvonne. It was Yvonne who at age sixteen inadvertently set in motion her aunt's literary career: Yvonne, while prostituting herself (without Audoux's knowledge) in the Parisian neighbourhood of the Halles, met a young man named Jules Iehl. Iehl, who also wrote under the pen name Michel Yell, was moved by the young woman's impossible situation and accompanied her home, where he met Audoux. Iehl and Audoux would remain romantically involved until 1912.

Yell introduced Audoux to the Parisian intelligentsia—a group that included Charles-Louis Philippe, Léon-Paul Fargue, Léon Werth and Francis Jourdain. He also encouraged her to write her memoirs. The memoirs fell into the hands of the celebrated author Octave Mirbeau and proved so compelling that Mirbeau immediately arranged to have them published.

Though success and critical acclaim followed quickly on the heels of the December 1910 publication of Audoux's memoirs, her next book was ten years in the making. The Studio of Marie-Claire, published in 1920, was merely a modest success; none of her subsequent novels--From the Mill to the Town (1926), The Fiancee (1932), and finally Soft Light, (1937)--matched the success of her bestseller debut.

After her death in January 1937, the novelist was buried in Saint-Raphaël, not far from the ocean she loved.

== Works ==
- Marie-Claire, with a foreword by Octave Mirbeau (1910). English translation by John N. Raphael, with an introduction by Arnold Bennett, London, Chapman & Hall, 1911, and New York, Hodder & Stoughton, 1911.
  - Audoux's first novel is the most autobiographical of the four. She describes her childhood and adolescence. The first part of the novel tells the story of her mother's death, of her father's departure, and of the nine years she spent in the orphanage of the convent Hôpital Général de Bourges. It was a dark period, made brighter however by the guiding presence of Sister Marie-Aimée. The second part of the novel takes place on the farm in Villevielle where Marie-Claire's first employers Master Sylvain and Pauline surround the young shepherdess with good-hearted affection. In the third part, Marie-Claire, now a young woman, falls in love with Henri Deslois, the brother of the farmer's wife who followed Pauline. The young man's mother forbids Marie-Claire to see her son again. Marie-Claire returns to the convent where she sees Sister Marie-Aimée before leaving again for Paris.
- L’Atelier de Marie-Claire (1920), Grasset, Les Cahiers Rouges, 1987. (Marie-Claire's Workshop)
  - The sewing shop where Marie-Claire found work is described as a big family. The owners, Mr. and Mrs. Dalignac and the workers, forced to work in factories when the sewing shop did not have enough work for them, share the same dependence on the sewing shop's demanding and stingy clients. And so the novel is both a social portrait that precisely depicts the characters of the workers as well as a series of anecdotes that keep the plot of the novel moving forward. After the death of the shop's owners, the reader doesn't know if Marie-Claire will marry Clément (Mrs. Dalignac's nephew), a man she does not love.
- De la ville au moulin, Fasquelle, 1926. (From the City to the Mill)
  - While trying to break up a fight between her parents, Annette Beauois is wounded in the hip and is left with a limp. She leaves for her uncle's mill, soon followed by her brothers and sisters that her parents entrust to her care due to their separation. At the age of twenty, she agrees to live with a friend of her brother's named Valère, who is an alcoholic and cheats on her. She leaves him while pregnant, going to Paris to give birth, but the child is stillborn. In Paris she gets back together with her family, then, after the war is over, she meets Valère again, who was severely wounded in the war. She is ready to give him a second chance.
- Douce Lumière, Grasset, 1937 (posth.) (Gentle Light)
  - Douce (Gentle) is Eglantine Lumière's nickname. Douce's mother died while giving birth to her, causing her father to kill himself out of despair, and her maternal grandfather unjustly takes out his bitterness over the affair on the young girl. Douce finds comfort in the company of her young neighbour Noël, and over the course of time, their relationship turns into love. But Douce is the victim of a vicious campaign by Noël's family to keep the lovers apart. The heroine, traumatized by her experience but remaining true to Noël's memory, goes back to Paris where she befriends her neighbour Jacques, unhappy in love and then widowed. The pair tries for love but fails. Jacques leaves for the war. When he returns he has lost his mind.
