= Dingo (disambiguation) =

Dingo is a canid species native to Australia.

Dingo may also refer to:

== Mammals ==
- Carolina dog, a domestic dog breed also known as the “American dingo”

== Arts and entertainment ==
=== Characters ===
- Dingo (animated character), a supporting character from the Disney animated TV series Gargoyles
- Dingo, French name for the Disney character Goofy
- Digeri Dingo, a supporting character from Disney animated TV series Taz-mania
- Dingo, in the film Monty Python and the Holy Grail, played by Carol Cleveland
- Dingo, an animal-faced superhero from the WildStorm comics universe
- Dingo Egret, the protagonist of the video game Zone of the Enders: The 2nd Runner

=== Film ===
- Dingo (film), a 1992 film
- The Dingo, a 1923 Australian silent film

=== Gaming ===
- Dingo Inc., a Japanese video game developer
- Dingo Games Inc., an independent game development company from British Columbia, Canada, that created Tasty Planet
- Red Dingo Games, an Adelaide-based video game development firm that made such games as PlayStation 3: Rain in Rio
- Dingoo, a Chinese handheld video game console

=== Music ===
- Dingo (band), a Finnish rock act
- The Dingoes, an Australian rock act
- Dingo (soundtrack), the soundtrack to the 1992 film, recorded by Miles Davis
- Dingo Creek Jazz and Blues Festival, an Australian music festival

=== Other ===
- Dingo (novel), a 1913 novel by Octave Mirbeau
- Dingo Studios, a fake children's TV studio from the Nickelodeon TV show iCarly

== People ==
- Ernie Dingo (born 1956), Aboriginal Australian entertainer
- nickname of Dino Restelli (1924–2006), American Major League Baseball player
- nickname of Dingwall Latham Bateson (1898–1967), British solicitor and President of the Law Society
- Dingo Warrior, a ring name of American professional wrestler James Brian Hellwig

== Places ==
- Dingo, Queensland, a town in Australia along the Capricorn Highway
- Dingo Creek, a river in the Mid North Coast region of New South Wales, Australia
- Dingo, a town in Angola

== In the military ==
- Dingo (scout car), an Australian World War II armoured scout car
- ATF Dingo, a German armoured car
- Daimler Dingo, a British armoured scout car
- Dingo, a variant of the unsuccessful De Havilland Dormouse fighter-reconnaissance biplane

== Other uses ==
- Dingo Bar, a bar in Paris, France
- Dingo Brand, a line of dog treats and dog chews manufactured by Spectrum Brands' United Pet Group
- The Dingoes, an Australian far-right extremist group
- Mitsubishi Dingo, a mini MPV automobile
- UQFC Dingoes, a soccer team at the University of Queensland
