= Abbé Jules =

1888 novel by Octave Mirbeau

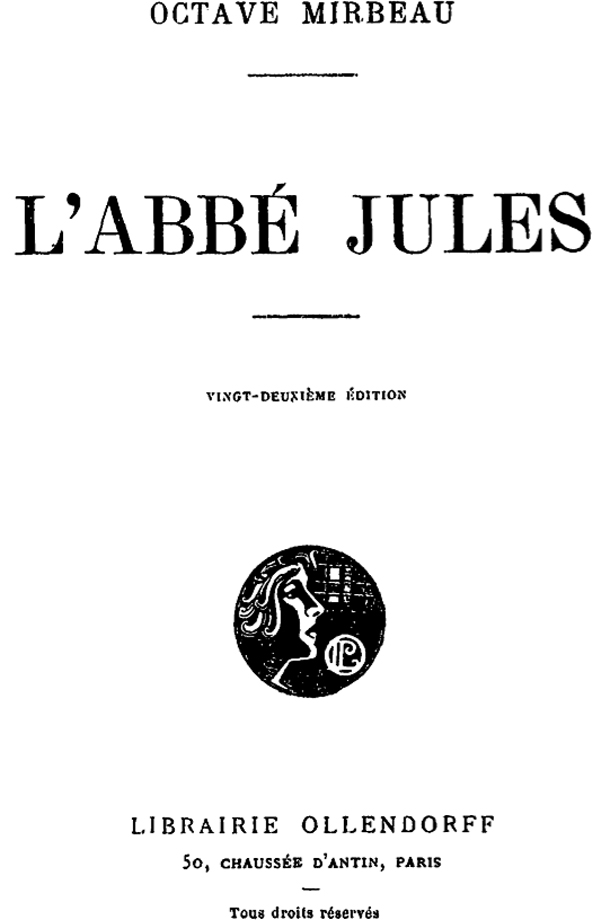
- Author: Octave Mirbeau
- Original title: 'L'Abbé Jules'
- Language: French
- Subject: revolt and madness of a Catholic priest
- Genre: Novel
- Publisher: Ollendorff
- Publication date: April 1888
- Publication place: France

L'Abbé Jules (Abbé Jules) is a novel written by the French journalist, novelist and playwright Octave Mirbeau, and published by Ollendorff in 1888.

== Plot summary ==
After reading Dostoevsky, Mirbeau plumbs the depths of psychology to describe a Catholic priest, Jules Dervelle, whose body and mind are rebelling against social oppression and the corruption of the Catholic Church.

An indictment of the dreary materialism of provincial French society, where life is governed by cupidity and closed-mindedness, Octave Mirbeau's 1888 novel, L'Abbé Jules also offers an indictment of the repressive institutions of family and religion. Object of his neighbors’ fearful curiosity, the novel's eponymous hero, Jules Dervelle, constitutes, for the author, a vehicle for exploring the mysteries of the human psyche, the abuses of religion, and the human longing for the transcendental and the sacred.

Returning to his native village of Viantais after a six-year absence in Paris, Jules revolutionizes his countrymen with his scandalous behavior and unorthodox religious views. Consenting to tutor his young nephew, Albert Dervelle – whom Mirbeau uses as an uncorrupted and innocent narrator – Jules exposes his ideas on sexuality, education, and man's "quest for an ideal".

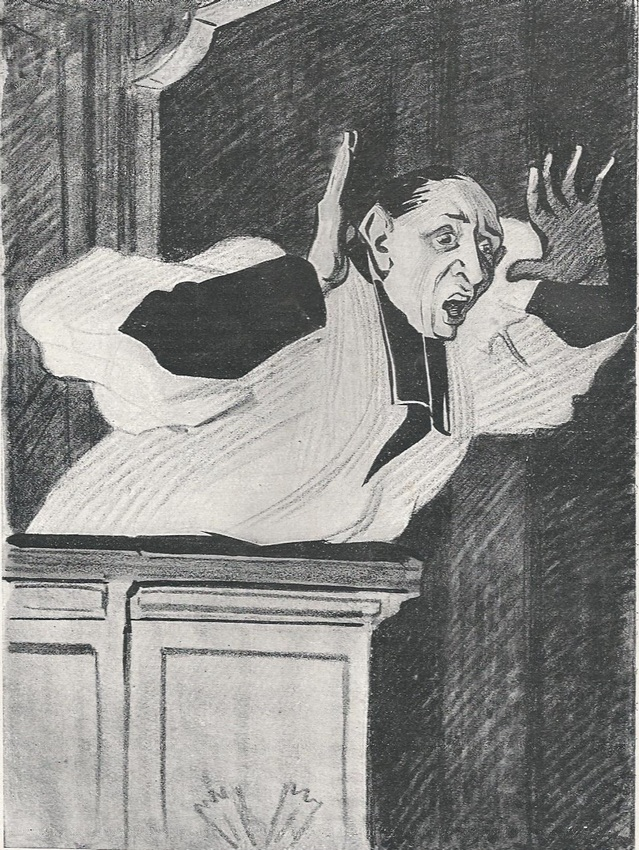
Hermann-Paul, L'Abbé Jules, 1904

Retrospective narrative allows Mirbeau to recount Jules's past, his introduction into the priesthood, and the scandalous behavior resulting in his subsequent exile to a remote parish. After his repatriation in Viantais, Jules installs himself in an overgrown country estate, where he delights in the unspoiled simplicity of nature. Wishing to instill in Albert the artlessness of animals, Jules instructs his young charge to throw away his books. He advises Albert that it is easier to "fabricate a Jesus or Mohammed" than it is to dismantle the adulterated social being that each individual has become so that can return to the original purity of his status as a "Nothing."

Jules is a self-contradictory and self-loathing character. He is a bibliomaniac who despises the artificiality of the knowledge found in books; when he comes to finagle from Père Pamphile – an old Trinitarian friar, who is both a double and the opposite of Jules – money he needs for his library, Pamphile indignantly refuses. He is an enemy of Catholicism, but he yearns for an experience of the divine.

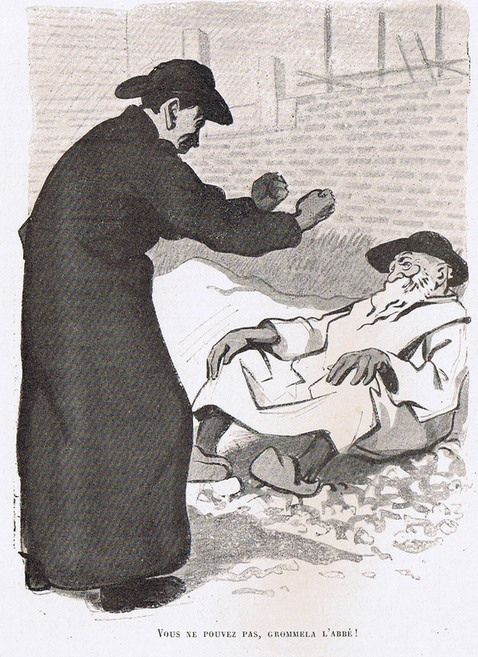
Hermann-Paul, Jules and Pamphile, 1904

Through Jules and Pamphile, two rich and complex characters, the author elaborates his evolving views on the social evils that pervert man's instincts, artistic sensibilities, and spiritual yearnings for the absolute.

Robert Ziegler : "For the most part, the message of Mirbeau's novel is a negative one, aimed at exposing the imposture perpetuated by doctors, judges, educators and priests, dismantling the symbolic systems that culture creates. Mirbeau's text designates literature as repository of meaning."

== English translation ==
- Abbé Jules, Sawtry, Dedalus, "Empire of the Senses", 1996, 232 pages. Translated by Nicolette Simborowski.

== Bibliography ==
- Yannick Lemarié, "Lazare en Octavie: le roman du mort vivant", Cahiers Octave Mirbeau, n° 17, 2010, 51–67.
- Robert Ziegler, "Birth and the book: The Incunabulum in Octave Mirbeau's L'Abbé Jules", Dalhousie French studies, n° 36, fall 1996, 100–112.
