= Jean Launois =

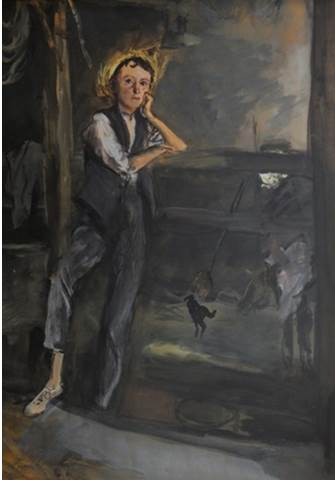
Peasant in Vendée

Jean Launois (22 November 1898 – 22 November 1942) was a French artist. Born in Les Sables-d'Olonne in Vendée, Launois demonstrated a gift and passion for drawing. His parents encouraged him, but his formal training was limited to working with Charles Milcendeau and later with Auguste Lepère. He had a short stint at the Ecole Julian in Paris. Launois did many sketches, drawings, and paintings during and after World War I.

== World War I ==
The first World War broke out in 1914. On 15 December 1916, Launois enlisted in the mounted artillery rather than waiting for his "age class" to be inducted. Documentation is scarce on his military service, but he did see action on the Western Front during the winter, spring, and summer of 1917. In late December 1917, his division was sent to the Eastern Front (Italy) where he again saw action. During this time, Launois created many sketches of and studies of French soldiers.

Even before demobilization in late 1918, Launois returned to his family’s home in Tour on leave. His father took him to Paris and introduced him to the assistant curator of the Luxembourg Palace Museum. Launois showed him his portfolio of drawings he had done during his military service. The Curator of the Museum, Léonce Bénédite, received permission from the Undersecretary of Arts to purchase 12 of Launois’ drawings for 500 French francs. Also in Tour, Launois did a portrait of Anatole France that was well-received, widely distributed and published in L’Illustration.

== Algeria ==
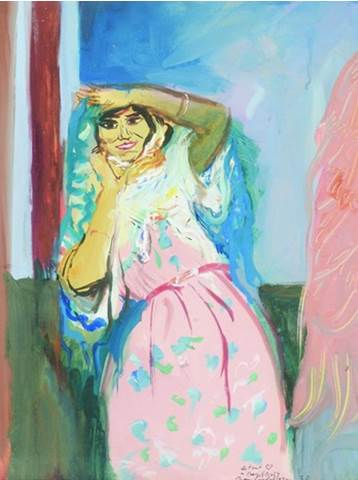
Oriental Woman at the Window

Later Bénédite purchased additional pictures from Launois and encouraged him to compete for the Algerian Scholarship (Bourse de l’Algerie). He won the grant, which carried with it a two-year stipend (room, board, some cash) at the Villa Abed-el-Tif in Algiers, 1920–22).

In Algeria, he met Fréderic Lung and Mesley, both serious collectors who purchased many pictures from him. He also met and traveled in the south with Albert Marquet and his future wife, with whom he established a deep, lifelong friendship.

== The 1920s and 1930s ==
In 1923, Launois won the Indochinese Prize (Le Prix de l’Indochine) of 3,000 francs which included a trip from France to Saigon. His time in Indo-China is well documented by letters home. He trekked by foot, horseback, and boat across the Indo-Chinese peninsula, drifted down the Mekong River on the private raft of a Laotian prince, and traveled roundtrip from Hanoi to China by railroad. During his travels, Launois documented his experiences with drawings and sketches that included the indigenous people of the forest and life in the villages and bars. During his short trip to China, he painted a Chinese bride that is in a private collection.

During the late 1920s, Launois traveled frequently between Paris, the Vendée, and Algeria. His first major exposition in 1926 was a great success. He also illustrated books for Roland Dorgèles, Francis Carco, and Octave Mirbeau, which are now collector's items. In 1927, Launois married Aimée Suarès Lévy, the niece of the poet André Suarès. While his artistic success continued, his marriage was strained by his independent and free personal life, heavy drinking, and association with the underworld of Paris.

By 1933, and the collapse of the economy, life for the Launois family became difficult. He was forced to trade pictures in return for a living. His in-laws had to sell their Paris apartment. Although living from hand-to-mouth, Launois continued to travel from Paris to North Africa during the winter, and in the summer to Saint-Jean-des-Monts, where he led an informal art school.

== World War II ==
In 1939, with the declaration of war between France and Germany, Launois was mobilized. His health was poor, his legs swollen, and he was suffering from eczema. After the intervention by well-placed friends, he was relieved of his more onerous duties and reassigned to a camouflage unit. In late 1940s, after the end of the war, he moved to his in-laws’ house in Saint-Tropez, where he found old friends and continued to paint and exhibit. However, he was restless to return to Algeria.

Launois returned to Algeria in March 1942. His health was failing and he was drinking heavily. His friends assumed responsibility for his needs. On 22 November 1942, he collapsed in a little park in front of the hotel in which he was living in Algiers, and was carried to his room, where he died.

The Museum of the Abbaye de la Sainte-Croix in Les Sables d’Olonne is the depository of an extensive collection of his paintings and drawings and documents. The drawings of Launois purchased by the Museum of the Palace of Luxembourg are now in the collection of the Museum of Modern Art, Centre Georges Pompidou, Beaubourg, Paris.

== More selected works ==
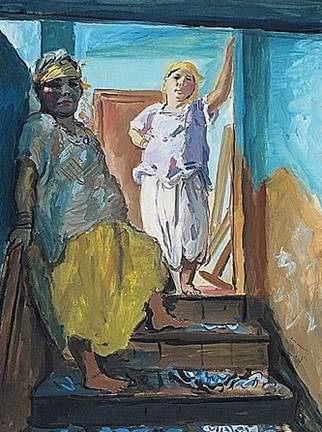
The Staircase

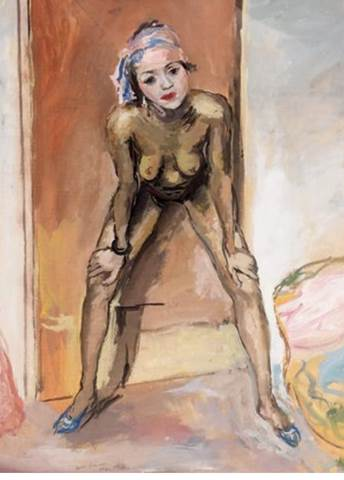
Nude with a Headband

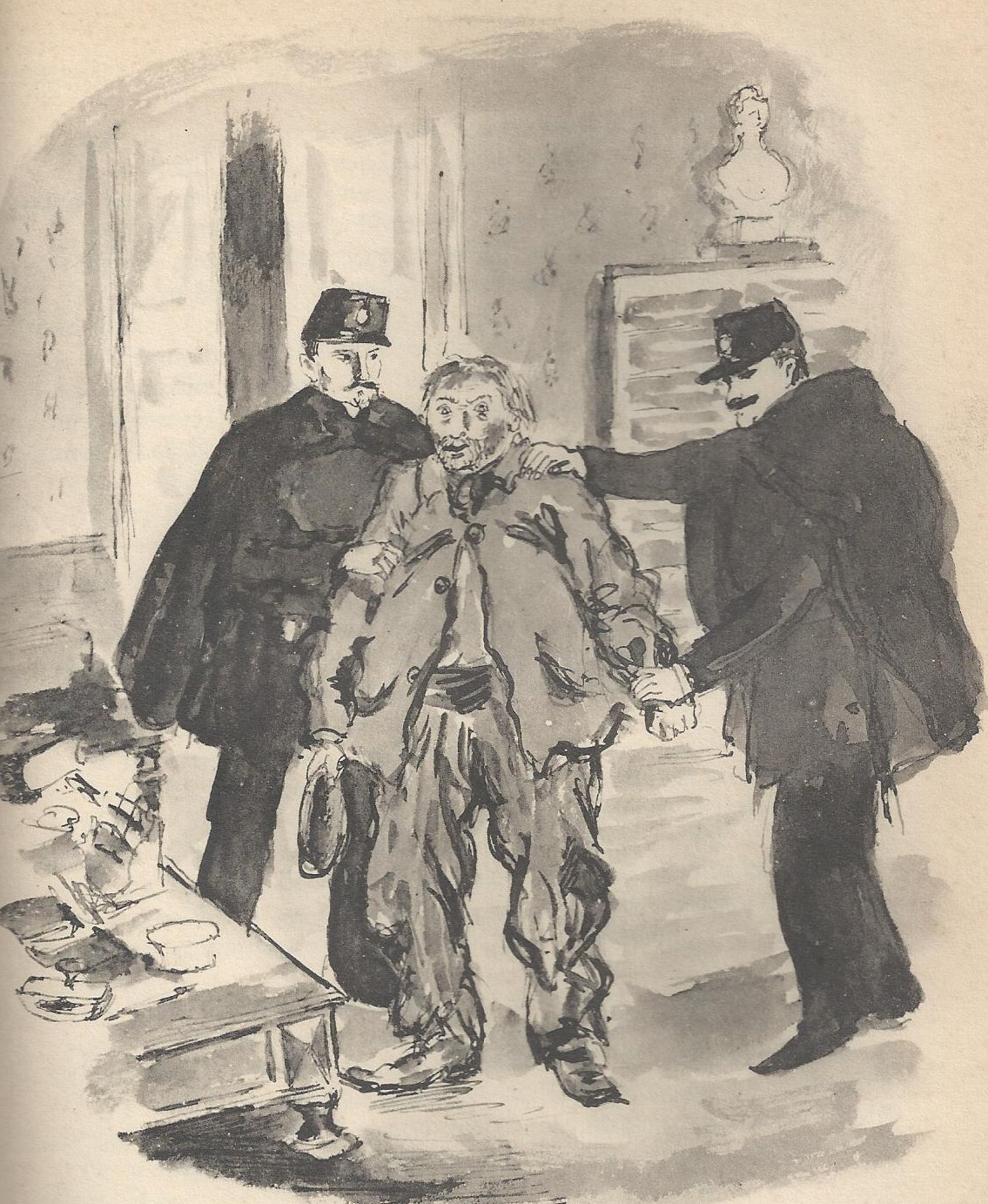
Illustration for Les Vingt et un Jours d'un neurasthénique

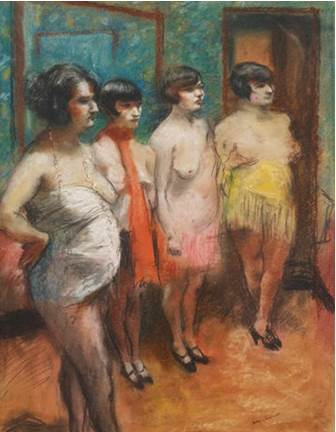
The Comparison
