= L'Amour de la femme vénale =

Essay

- Author: Octave Mirbeau
- Original title: Любовта на продажната жена
- Translator: Alexandre Lévy; Bérangère de Grandpré
- Language: French
- Subject: Prostitution
- Publisher: Éditions Indigo and Côté Femmes
- Publication date: 1994
- English publication date: 2005
- Pages: 91
- ISBN: 978-2907883733

L'Amour de la femme vénale is the French title of a brief essay by French writer Octave Mirbeau on prostitution. Originally published in Bulgarian in Plovdiv, Bulgaria, in 1922 as Любовта на продажната жена. It was translated into French by Alexandre Lévy, (the original French text has remained undiscovered to this day), the essay was published in 1994 by Éditions Indigo and Côté Femmes and was accompanied an introduction by Pierre Michel, a professor specialising the writer Octave Mirbeau, and a preface by historian Alain Corbin. The essay was translated into English and Italian in 2005 by Bérangère de Grandpré.

== Chronology ==
=== Discovery ===
Bulgarian historian, Niko Nikov, discovered the essay in booklet form entitled Любовта на продажната жена, which had been published in Plovdiv, by 'Spolouka' in 1922, in the Sofia National Library. The work did not appear in any inventory of Mirbeau's works, but was authenticated as being written by Mirbeau by Pierre Michel.

Mirbeau had died in 1917, so the 1922 booklet was published five years after his death. It is thought the essay was probably written between 1910 and 1913, possibly in 1912. No French versions or manuscript have been found. There have been a number of theories as to the history of the essay prior to the 1922 publication.

- It may have been a compilation of a series of articles originally in the French or Belgium press. Pierre Michel doubts this theory as there is a high likelihood the original articles would have been known as part of Mirbeau's works. Literature professor Mireille Dottin-Orsini also dismisses this theory. Mirbeau had married Alice Regnault in 1887, a former prostitute who was trying to gain a reputation as a writer. Mirbeau would not have wanted a work about prostitution to be published in France in case it brought attention to his wife's past life.
- The essay may have been written for a Russian intellectual or anarchist review, (Mirbeau's works were well received in Russia at the time). The essay being subsequently translated from Russian to Bulgarian, as many other of his works had been. Dottin-Orsini supports this theory.
- The essay may have been commissioned by a Bulgarian publisher, or submitted as a series of articles for a Bulgarian review. (At the time there was a lot of French influence in Bulgaria). With the start of the Balkan Wars in late 1912, followed by WW1, publication may have been delayed by the hostilities. If correct, this theory would imply the essay was written in 1912.

=== French translation ===
The Bulgarian booklet was translated into French by Alexandre-Léon Lévy at the request of Pierre Michel so he could verify that the essay was indeed written by Mirbeau. Lévy's translation was subsequently published by Éditions Indigo – Côté Femmes, with an introduction by Michel and a preface by Alain Corbin, a French historian who specialises in the late 19th century in France, including prostitution.

=== Other translations ===
On behalf of the Société Octave Mirbeau, Bérangère de Grandpré translated the essay into English (The Love of a Venal Woman) and Italian (L’amore della donna venale) in 2005.

== Synopsis ==
In L'Amour de la femme vénale, Mirbeau explores the causes of prostitution, both economic and social, from his own experiences. He also examines the prostitute's relationship with clients, her loves, her future and her body.

The work is divided into six chapters:

- The origins of the prostitute (Origine de la prostituée)
- The prostitute's body (Le corps de la prostituée)
- The visit (La visite)
- The prostitute's hatred and courage (La haine et le courage de la prostituée)
- The prostitute's love (L’amour de la prostituée)
- Her future (Son avenir)

In his work, Mirbeau intends to rehabilitate prostitutes who, far from being inherently vicious and perverse women as Cesare Lombroso would maintain, were doubly victims: on the one hand, because of the economic and social conditions inflicted on women coming from disadvantaged backgrounds; and, on the other hand, because of the hypocrisy of a controlling class that scorns, rejects and condemns, in the name of a spurious "morality", the women whose services are needed as a result of the sexual frustration caused by monogamous marriages.

According to Mirbeau, there is a veritable war that pits the sexes against one another, and prostitutes are in the vanguard of this struggle, since they cannot be duped by the vain and overbearing speech and appearance of male customers whom they encounter in their repulsive nudity, as had the chambermaid Célestine in Mirbeau's Le Journal d’une femme de chambre (The Diary of a Chambermaid). According to Mirbeau, prostitutes are potentially anarchists, and the sexual relationship between them and their clients more closely resembles a duel. But it is the prostitute who emerges victorious from this struggle, since she knows how to ignite a man's desire and since, in her profession, and she is prepared to endure everything.

In the tradition of Dostoyevsky, Mirbeau expresses his pity and admiration for his sisters in misery, who live and die in such deplorable conditions. It was Mirbeau's wish that prostitutes enjoy the same rights and the same social recognition accorded to other workers. It was his forlorn hope that, in a distant era, the services provided by prostitutes would be given their just due. But, in that case, the work they performed would no longer have anything to do with what is now defined as "prostitution".
