= Père Pamphile =

Pamphile
- First appearance: L'Abbé Jules (Abbé Jules) (1888)
- Created by: Octave Mirbeau

In-universe information
- Species: Human
- Gender: Male
- Occupation: Monk
- Nationality: French

Père Pamphile is a fictional character in the novel Abbé Jules (fr. L'Abbé Jules), by the French writer Octave Mirbeau (1888). A marginal figure in Mirbeau's tale, Père Pamphile is nonetheless an extraordinary and striking character, whose history Mirbeau retraces in the course of a long flashback.

== Madness or wisdom? ==
A monk belonging to the Trinitarian Order whose mission had formerly been to secure the release of Christian prisoners held hostage by Barbary pirates, Pamphile had lived, since the time of the dissolution of the brotherhood, alone on the grounds on the ruined Abbey de Réno, in Perche, where he had come to entertain a host of fantastical and mad ideas. By dint of living by himself, sustained on himself, far from all intellectual contact, haunted by a single idea, in this mortal solitude, in the silence that only the creaking of beams and the collapsing of walls disturbed, a strange process of mental crystallization had taken place in the brain of Père Pamphile. After hesitating, after combating doubts, and refuting objections discussed alone with himself, Pamphile had arrived at the conclusion that there still remained captives needing to be freed from the hands of infidels.” Thereafter, Pamphile undertakes to amass the money needed to rebuild the abbey chapel, a precondition, he believed to freeing these prisoners. To this end, he sets off across France, where, over the course of several decades, he begs, endures hardships and humiliations, while regularly returning to Réno to continue the work of reconstruction. But, exploited by those from whom he seeks financial assistance, Pamphile, unconcerned, sees the money he collects slip through his fingers, and his project never comes any closer to completion.

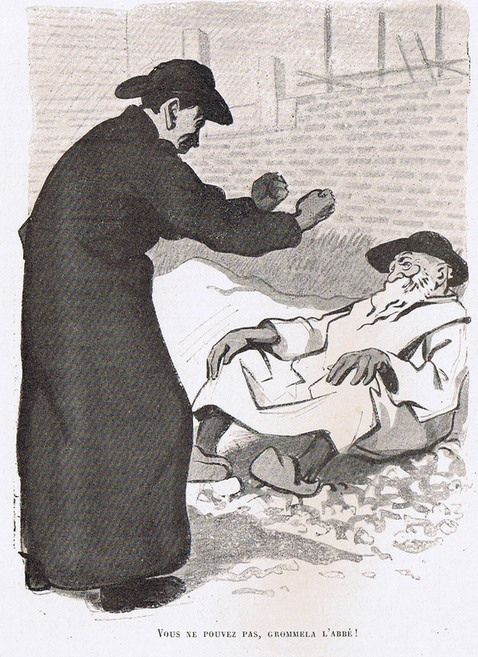
Jules and Pamphile, by Hermann-Paul, 1904

When Abbé Jules comes to finagle from Pamphile money he needs for his library, Pamphile indignantly refuses. Not long thereafter, Jules returns to find Pamphile dead, after being crushed from the collapse of the partially constructed chapel, his body already in a state of advanced decomposition. Burying the monk on the abbey grounds, Jules delivers his elegy alone: "Rest peacefully, old carcass, no one will trouble the peace of this place that you cherished. Gentle dreamer, you'll sleep in your dream, in the chapel that you imagined so impossibly magnificent, and which you at least were able to use as your sepulcher. And of you, sublime carrion, no one will ever, ever know anything!"

Inspired by a monk from the Abbey of Cerfroid whom Mirbeau had once met, Pamphile is both a double and the opposite of Abbé Jules. Like Jules, he aspires to an absolute, entertains chimerical dreams, behaves irrationally. But while Jules suffers from his contradictions, Pamphile lives blissfully through the hardships he inflicts on himself, in the vain hope of fulfilling his impossible project. He has nothing mean-spirited about him. He willingly endures sacrifices as the price he believes he must pay for his faith to be vindicated. The reader is therefore faced with a dilemma: on the one hand, Pamphile is demonstrably insane. On the other hand, in the course of his long privations, he has achieved a level of worldly renunciation and spiritual detachment that has brought him the wisdom extolled by the philosophers of antiquity, Stoics, Epicureans, Skeptics, the same wisdom advocated by Schopenhauer and Buddhists.

It is this ideal of enlightenment – of Nirvana – (the pseudonym used by Octave Mirbeau in his 1885 Lettres de l'Inde) that the tempestuous and impassioned Jules is incapable of achieving. Hence the question Mirbeau raises: is not the height of folly also the height of wisdom?
