= Les Mémoires de mon ami =

A story by French writer Octave Mirbeau, Les Mémoires de mon ami was first published serially in Le Journal between November 27, 1898 and April 30, 1899, in the midst of the Dreyfus Affair. After the author’s death, it was collected in a volume published in 1919 Chez l'Illustre écrivain by Flammarion and then as a booklet in the collection "Une heure d’oubli", published also by Flammarion in 1920. The most recent edition, comprising 152 pages, appeared in 2007 in L'Arbre Vengeur (Talence).

== A text resisting genre classification ==
A short novel or long novella, the story was clearly written off-hand and gives an impression of incompletion (it stops abruptly with no explanation), thereby recalling Mirbeau’s Dans le ciel, which was written six years earlier. It is apparent that the Dreyfus Affair had captured the exclusive attention of an author willing to give up production of a work whose value was purely remunerative.

Les Mémoires de mon ami are presented as a first-person narrative having no predetermined order. Following the thread of the narrator’s memories, the work has no discernible unity or chronological continuity. Here again, Mirbeau rejects any contrived narrative ordering that might suggest that everything happens for a reason and in accordance with final causes.

== Pity and revolt ==
The narrator, Charles L., is an unremarkable cashier seemingly bereft of personality, a man condemned to live forever a larval existence. However, once he is confronted with the crushing stupidity and overwhelmingly hideousness of his fellow-beings (beginning with those of his wife and in-laws), he withdraws into his own inner world, into the realm of the imagination and dream, which Mirbeau saw as so important, and which established the author's affinity with his contemporary, Sigmund Freud.

Alienated from others and from himself, Charles L. develops a capacity for pitiless observation, which allows him to detect all of society's absurd and ignominious features in their petrifying horror. Thereafter, he makes pity and revolt against a homicidal society « the bases of his moral life », as he testifies in his confession, which constitutes an instrument of revenge for his shabby, wretched life.
