= Farces et moralités =

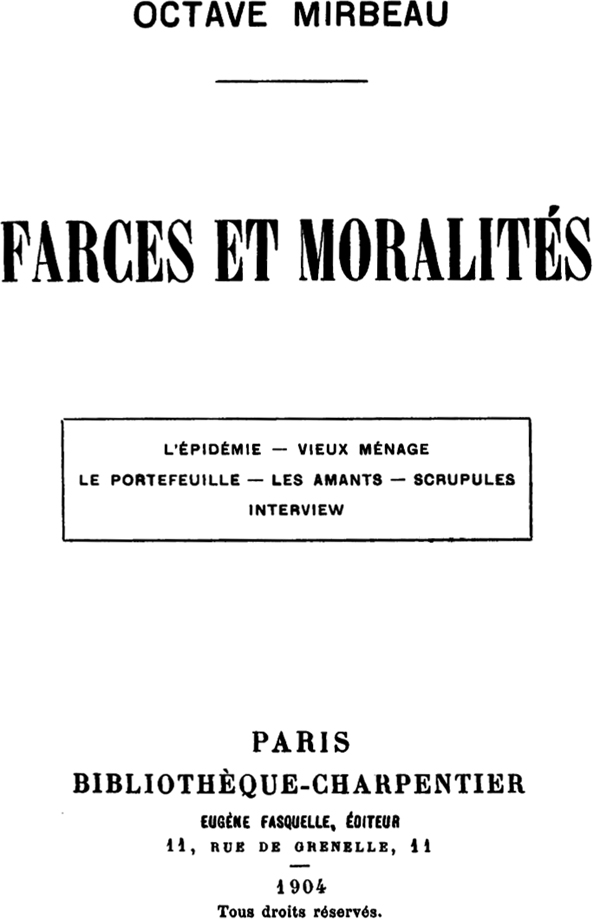
- Author: Octave Mirbeau
- Original title: Farces et moralités
- Language: French
- Genre: comedy
- Publisher: Fasquelle
- Publication date: 1904
- Publication place: France

Farces et moralités (Farces and morality plays) is a collection of six comedy plays in one act, written by the French novelist and playwright Octave Mirbeau and published by Fasquelle in 1904: Vieux ménages (Old couples), L’Épidémie (The Epidemic, Bloomington, University of Denver Press, 1949), Les Amants (The Lovers), Scrupules (Scruples, New York, Samuel French, 1923), Le Portefeuille (The Purse) and Interview.

== Commentary ==
To Mirbeau, the aim is always to demystifies and ridicules all that stupid people blindly respect: the law, which is oppressive by nature, and the police, which is arbitrary and repressive by definition; love, a deception, and marriage, a quagmire; wealth, ill-acquired, and social success, a deceptive façade; the newspapers, which anaesthetize people and provide false information, and the politicians, who are quite indifferent to social misery and concerned only with their own emoluments. Its originality is to extend the challenge to language itself, thanks to which the dominant classes obtain the submission and the respect of the dominated and perpetuate an inegalitarian social order.

According to critics, Mirbeau succeeds however in making the public laugh at that which should really drive to despair, in the hope that the spark of conscience will help to live better, to exercise better one's liberty of mind, and to rebel against social institutions.

Although placing itself in the continuity of medieval morality plays, which had a pedagogical and moralizing purpose, Mirbeau deliberately chose the mood of farce, in which exaggeration, acceleration of the rhythm, caricature, plays on words, the grotesque, and the absurd are acceptable and assure the indispensable distancing effect, without any realism. He anticipates all at once the theater of Bertolt Brecht, Marcel Aymé, Harold Pinter, and Eugène Ionesco.
