= Alfred Cadart =

French printer, writer and publisher

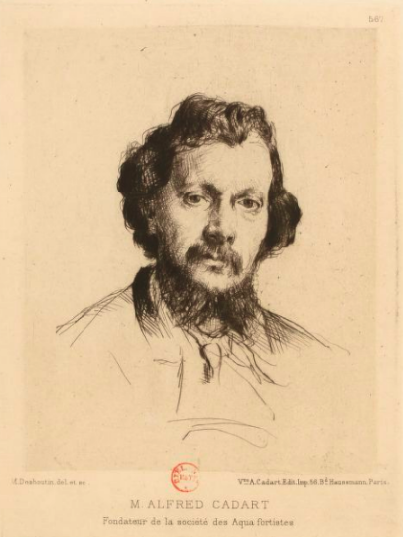
Etching of Cadart by Marcellin Desboutin.

Alfred Cadart (4 April 1828 – 27 April 1875) was a French printer, writer and publisher, notable for his major part in the etching revival in mid-19th-century France and beyond. As founder of the French Société des Aquafortistes, he combined strategic understanding with a passion for the artistic qualities of the etching.

His efforts to promote the art of etching did not bring him financial success, but he did help develop the infrastructure for original printmaking that emerged in the 1890s.

== Life ==
He was born in Saint-Omer to a hotelier and began his working life in the Compagnie des chemins de fer du Nord. He married the sister of François Chifflart, a painter. He made contact with emerging realist artists such as Alphonse Legros and François Bonvin and later published several plates after paintings by Gustave Courbet.

== Bibliography ==
- (in French) Janine Bailly-Herzberg, Tome 1 : L'eau-forte de peintre au XIXe siècle : la société des aquafortistes. 1862-1867; Tome 2 : Dictionnaire de la Société des aquafortistes, Paris, Éditions Léonce Laget, 1972.
