= Le Calvaire =

1886 novel by Octave Mirbeau

Calvary
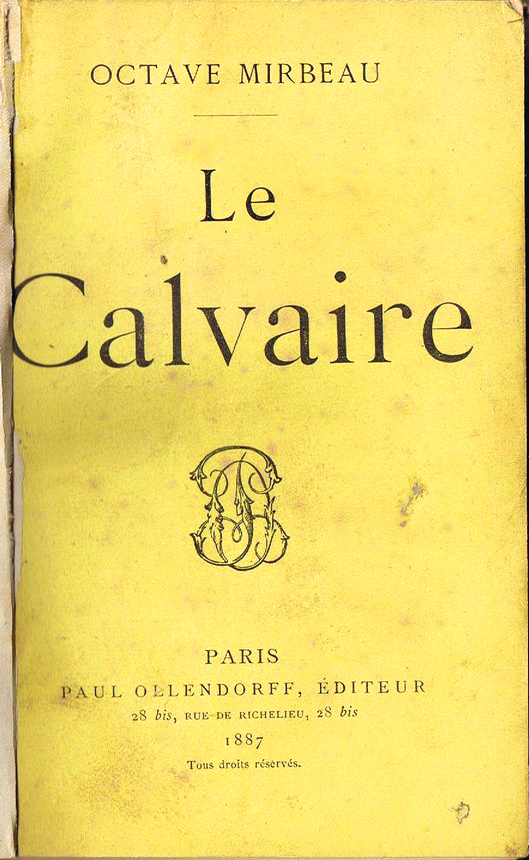
- Author: Octave Mirbeau
- Original title: Le Calvaire
- Language: French
- Subject: the passion of a lover
- Genre: Novel
- Publisher: Ollendorff
- Publication date: November 1886
- Publication place: France

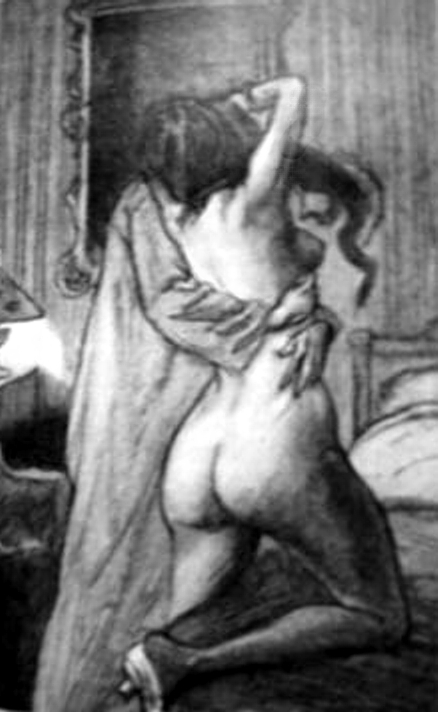
Le Calvaire, illustrated by Georges Jeanniot, 1901.

Le Calvaire (Calvary) is a novel written by the French journalist, novelist and playwright Octave Mirbeau, and published by Ollendorff in 1886.

== Plot summary ==
Le Calvaire is a largely autobiographical novel, in which Mirbeau romanticizes his devastating affair with a woman of dubious morals, Judith Vinmer, who appears as "Juliette Roux" in the novel.

The story is narrated in the first person by the main character, the antihero Jean Mintie, who has literary ambition and the potential to become a good writer, but is incapable of overcoming his sexual obsessions. Victimized by a woman and reduced to a state of humiliated impotence, he tries to transform his suffering into an impulse to create. His redemptive passion is modeled on the Passion of Christ. In the final pages, the image of Christ is replaced by the corpses of men fallen in the battle of love.

== Quotations ==
"I understood that the law of the world was strife; an inexorable, murderous law, which was not content with arming nation against nation but which hurled against one another the children of the same race, the same family, the same womb. I found none of the lofty abstractions of honor, justice, charity, patriotism of which our standard books are so full, on which we are brought up, with which we are lulled to sleep, through which they hypnotize us in order the better to deceive the kind little folk, to enslave them the more easily, to butcher them the more foully."

"They condemn to death the stealthy murderer who kills the passerby with a knife, on the corner of the street at night, and they throw his beheaded body into a grave of infamy. But the conqueror who has burned cities and decimated human beings, all the folly and human cowardice unite in raising to the throne of the most marvelous; in his honor triumphal arches are built, giddy columns of bronze are erected, and in the cathedrals multitudes reverently kneel before his tomb of hallowed marble guarded by saints and angels under the delighted gaze of God!"

== English translations ==
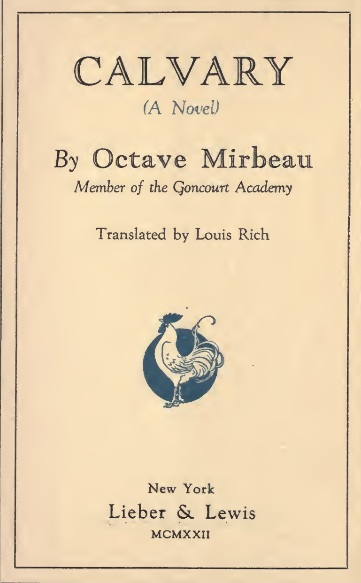
Calvary, 1922

- Calvary, New York, Lieber and Lewis, 1922, 266 pages (OCLC 6315714). Translated by Louis Rich.
- Calvary, New York, Albert and Charles Boni, 1924, 266 pages (OCLC 36345997).
- Le Calvaire, Sawtry, Dedalus/Hippocrene, « Empire of the Senses », 1995, 232 pages (OCLC 34546259). Translated by Christine Donougher.
