= La 628-E8 =

1907 novel by Octave Mirbeau

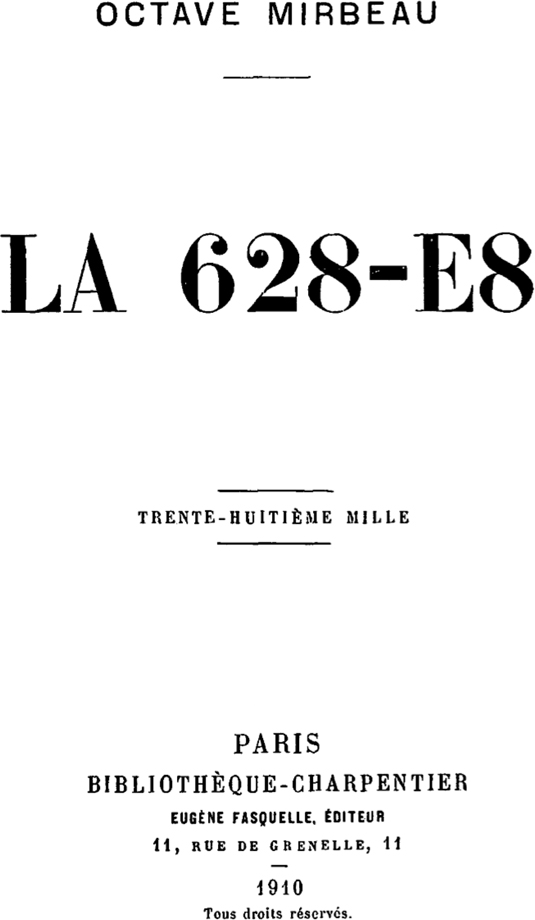
- Author: Octave Mirbeau
- Original title: 'La 628-E8'
- Language: French
- Genre: Travelogue, Novel
- Publisher: Fasquelle
- Publication date: November 1907
- Publication place: France

La 628-E8 is a novel by the French novelist and playwright Octave Mirbeau, published by Fasquelle in 1907. Part travelogue, part cultural commentary and critique, Mirbeau's book highlights its own unclassifiability: "Is it a diary?”, the narrator wonders. "Is it even the account of a trip?”

== Plot ==
Titled after the number of Mirbeau's licence plate, La 628-E8 begins by recounting Mirbeau’s travels to Belgium, whose colonial exploitation of Belgian Congo rubber and abuse of the indigenous people Mirbeau excoriates. The book then proceeds to the Netherlands, where he finds remembrances of Rembrandt, Van Gogh and also Claude Monet. It is during his sojourn in this country that Mirbeau encounters his old friend, the deranged speculator Weil-See, whose reflections on mathematics and metaphysics are among Mirbeau’s most colorful pages. Mirbeau's fictional car trip then takes him to Germany, whose industry, cleanliness, and order stand in contrast to what Mirbeau regarded as the slovenliness and laxity of his own countrymen.

== Commentary ==
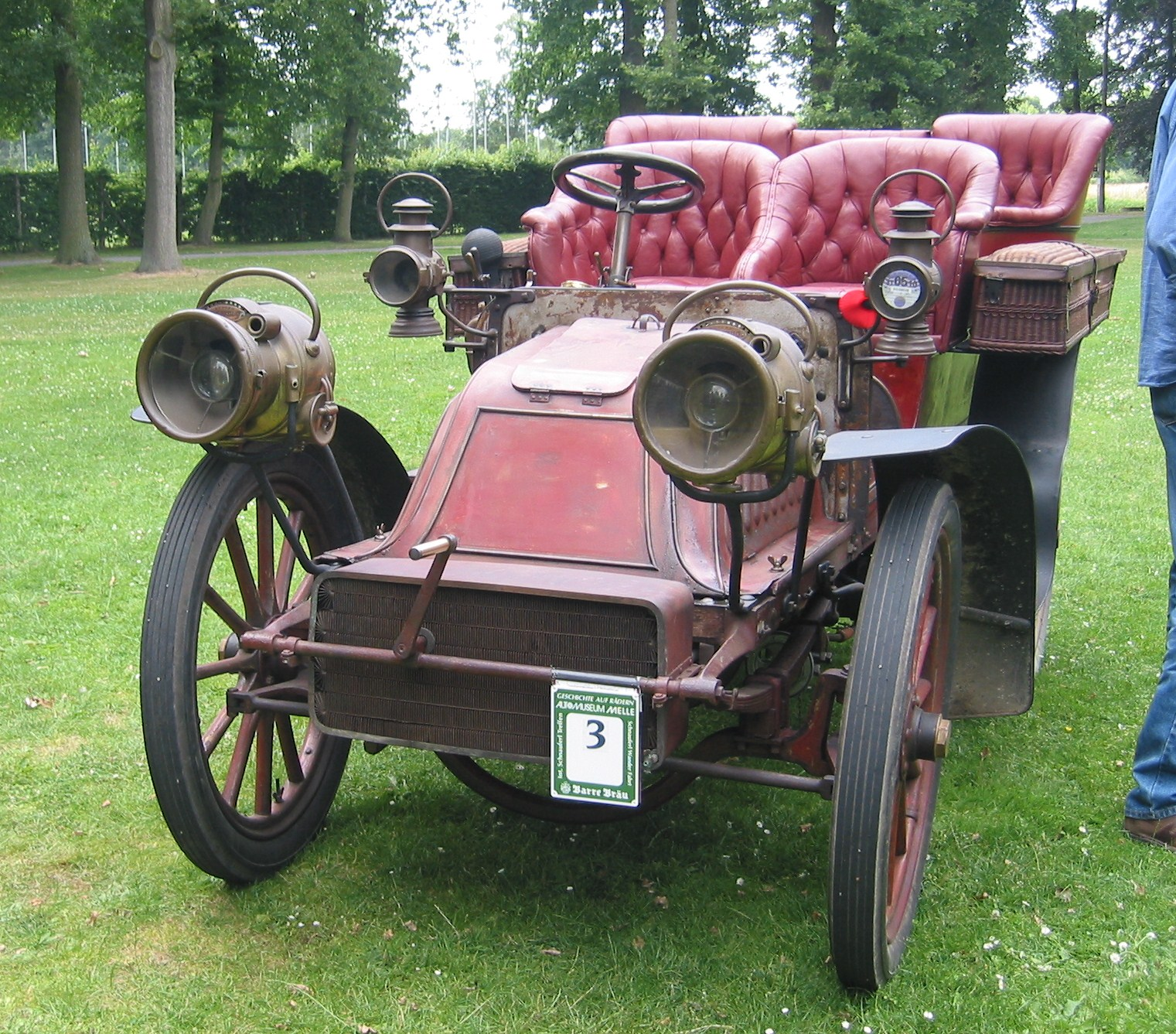
Charron C.G.V., 1902

To Mirbeau, the automobile represents an ideal instrument for combatting ethnocentrism and xenophobia. The novel’s most electrifying descriptions recreate in readers the speeding motorist’s dazed disorientation as the missile of his vehicle carries him past epileptic telegraph poles and blurred animals along the roadside.

In an incongruous final section underscoring the novel’s fractured structure, Mirbeau appends a scandalous account of La Mort de Balzac (The Death of Balzac), relating the author’s death agonies while, in an adjoining room, his wife, Mme Hanska, engaged in sexual frolicking with painter Jean Gigoux. One can only surmise the controversial episode constituted another instance of the kind of iconoclastic writing that Mirbeau was inclined to engage in.

An English translation, not complete, has been published : Sketches of a journey, illustrated by Pierre Bonnard.
