= Octave Mirbeau =

French writer, art critic and journalist (1848–1917)

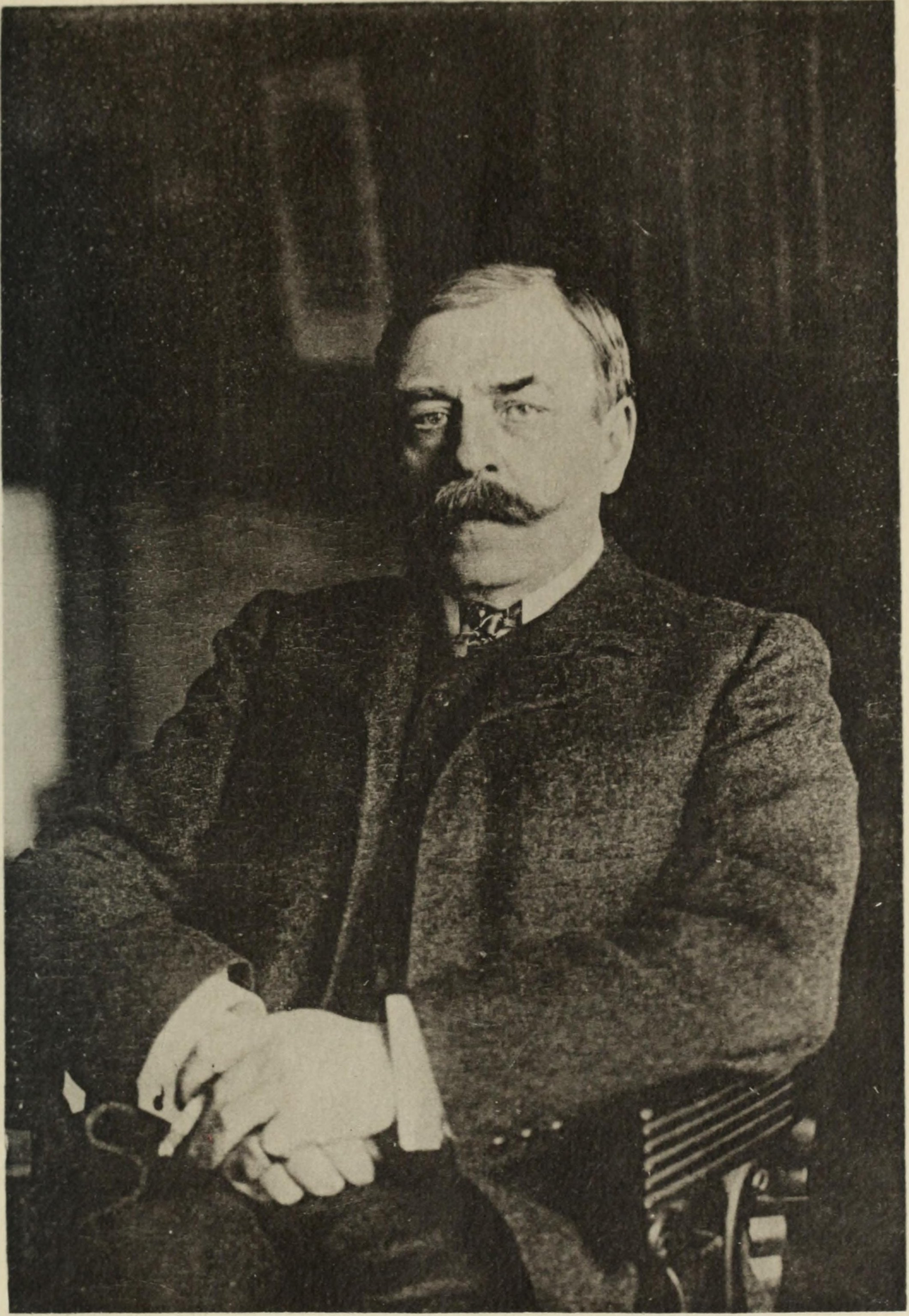
- Born: Octave Henri Marie Mirbeau; 16 February 1848; Trévières, France
- Died: 16 February 1917 (aged 69); Paris, France
- Resting place: Passy Cemetery, Paris
- Occupations: Novelist, playwright, journalist, pamphleteer
- Spouse: Alice Regnault (m. 1887)
- Writing career
- Genres: Novel, comedy, chronicles, art critic
- Notable works: The Torture Garden (1899); The Diary of a Chambermaid (1900)
- Movements: Impressionism, expressionism, decadent, avant-garde

Octave Henri Marie Mirbeau (French: [ɔktav miʁbo]; 16 February 1848 – 16 February 1917) was a French novelist, art critic, travel writer, pamphleteer, journalist and playwright, who achieved celebrity in Europe and great success among the public, whilst still appealing to the literary and artistic avant-garde with highly transgressive novels that explored violence, abuse and psychological detachment. His work has been translated into 30 languages.

== Biography ==
=== Aesthetic and political struggles ===
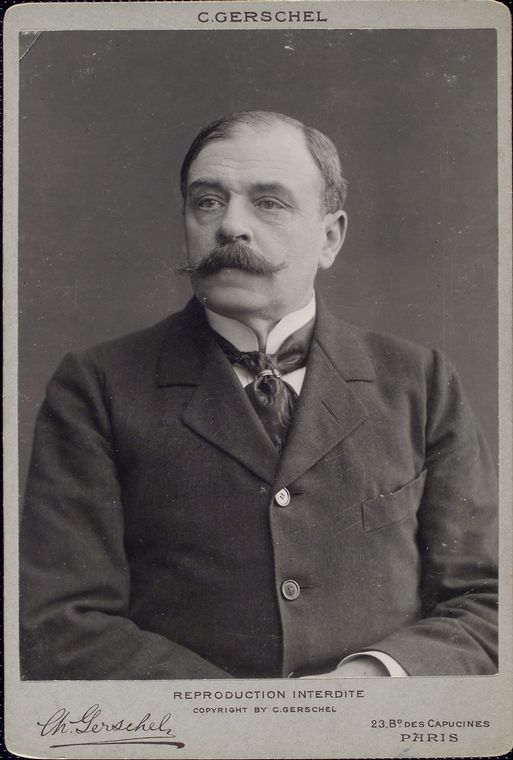
Octave Mirbeau.

The grandson of Norman notaries and the son of a doctor, Mirbeau spent his childhood in a village in Normandy, Rémalard, pursuing secondary studies at a Jesuit college in Vannes, which expelled him at the age of fifteen. Two years after the traumatic experience of the 1870 war, he was tempted by a call from the Bonapartist leader Dugué de la Fauconnerie, who hired him as private secretary and introduced him to L'Ordre de Paris.

After his debut in journalism in the service of the Bonapartists, and his debut in literature when he worked as a ghostwriter, Mirbeau began to publish under his own name. Thereafter, he wrote in order to express his own ethical principles and aesthetic values. A supporter of the anarchist cause (cf. La Grève des électeurs) and fervent supporter of Alfred Dreyfus, Mirbeau embodied the intellectual who involved himself in civic issues. Independent of all parties, Mirbeau believed that one's primary duty was to remain lucid.

As an art critic, he campaigned on behalf of the "great gods nearest to his heart": he sang the praises of Auguste Rodin, Claude Monet, Camille Pissarro, Paul Cézanne, Paul Gauguin, Félicien Rops Auguste Renoir, Félix Vallotton, and Pierre Bonnard, and was an early advocate of Vincent van Gogh, Camille Claudel, Aristide Maillol, and Maurice Utrillo (cf. his Combats esthétiques, 1993).

Alongside his long friendship with Claude Monet, Mirbeau maintained a close personal and artistic relationship with Camille Pissarro, reflected in an extensive correspondence. The published Mirbeau-Pissarro correspondence contains 88 letters by Mirbeau, while many of Pissarro's replies from this period are preserved in volume III (1891-1894) of Janine Bailly-Herzberg's edition of Pissarro's correspondence. On 22 September 1891, Mirbeau visited Pissarro and his family at their home in Éragny-sur-Epte; the following day he referred to the visit in a letter to Monet.

As a literary critic and early member of Académie Goncourt, he 'discovered' Maurice Maeterlinck and Marguerite Audoux and admired Remy de Gourmont, Marcel Schwob, Léon Bloy, Georges Rodenbach, Alfred Jarry, Charles-Louis Philippe, Émile Guillaumin, Valery Larbaud and Léon Werth (cf. his Combats littéraires, 2006).

=== Mirbeau's novels ===
==== Autobiographical novels ====
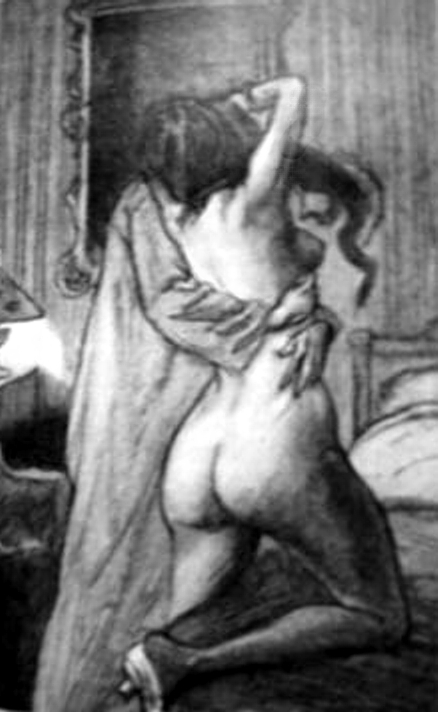
Pierre-Georges Jeanniot, Le Calvaire (1901)

Mirbeau ghostwrote ten novels, including three for the Swiss writer Dora Melegari. He made his own literary debut with Le Calvaire (Calvary, 1886), in which writing allowed him to overcome the traumatic effects of his devastating liaison with the ill-reputed Judith Vinmer (1858–1951), renamed Juliette Roux in the novel.

In 1888, Mirbeau published L'Abbé Jules (Abbé Jules), the first pre-Freudian novel written under the influence of Dostoevsky to appear in French literature; the text featured two main characters: l'abbé Jules and Father Pamphile. In Sébastien Roch (1890) (English translation: Sébastien Roch, 2000), Mirbeau purged the traumatic effects of his experience as a student at a Jesuits school in Vannes. In the novel, the 13-year-old Sébastien is sexually abused by a priest at the school and the abuse destroys his life.

==== Crisis of the novel ====
Mirbeau then underwent a grave existential and literary crisis, yet during this time, he still published in serial form a pre-existentialist novel about the artist's fate, Dans le ciel (In the Sky), introducing the figure of a painter (Lucien), directly modeled on Van Gogh. In the aftermath of the Dreyfus Affair — which exacerbated Mirbeau's pessimism — he published two novels judged to be scandalous by self-styled paragons of virtue: Le Jardin des supplices (Torture Garden) (1899) and Le Journal d'une femme de chambre (Diary of a Chambermaid) (1900), then Les Vingt et un Jours d'un neurasthénique (The Twenty One Days of a Neurasthenic Person) (1901). In the process of writing these works, Mirbeau unsettled traditional novelistic conventions, exercising collage techniques, transgressing codes of verisimilitude and fictional credibility, and defying the hypocritical rules of propriety.

==== Death of the novel ====
In his last two novels, La 628-E8 (1907) – including La Mort de Balzac – and Dingo (1913), he strayed ever further from realism, giving free rein to clinical fantasy elements and casting his cat and his own dog as heroes. These last Mirbeau stories show a complete break with the conventions of realist fiction, also signifying a breakdown of reality.

=== Mirbeau's theatre ===
In the theatre, Mirbeau made his first steps with a proletarian drama and modern tragedy, Les Mauvais bergers (The Bad Shepherds, 1897). Then he experienced worldwide acclaim with Les affaires sont les affaires (Business is business, 1903) — his classical comedy of manners and characters in the tradition of Molière. Here Mirbeau featured the character of Isidore Lechat, predecessor of the modern master of business intrigue, a product of the new world, a figure who makes money from everything and spreads his tentacles out over the world.

In 1908 — at the end of a long legal and media battle — Mirbeau saw his play Le Foyer (Home) performed by the Comédie-Française. In this work he broached a new taboo subject: the economic and sexual exploitation of adolescents in a home that pretended to be a charitable one.

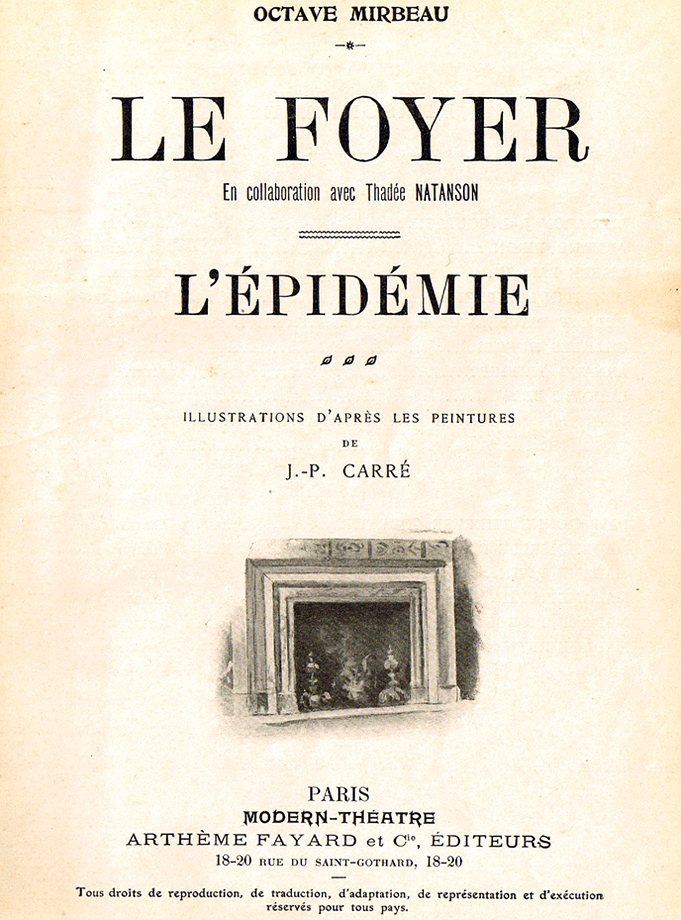
Le Foyer

He also wrote six one-act plays, published under the title of Farces et moralités (1904), among them being L'Épidémie (Epidemics, 1898). Here, Mirbeau can be seen as anticipating the theatre of Bertolt Brecht, Marcel Aymé, Harold Pinter, and Eugène Ionesco. He calls language itself into question, demystifying law, ridiculing the discourse of politicians, and making fun of the language of love (Les Amants, The Lovers, 1901).

=== Posthumous fame ===
There has been no interruption in the publication of Mirbeau's works. Yet his immense literary production has largely been known through only three works, and he was considered as literally and politically incorrect.

More recently, the "Octave Mirbeau Society" published more elements on the role Mirbeau played in the political, literary, and artistic world of la Belle Époque.

Mirbeau lies buried in the Passy Cemetery, in the 16th arrondissement of Paris.

== Works ==
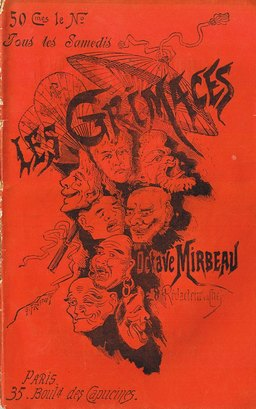
Les Grimaces (1883)

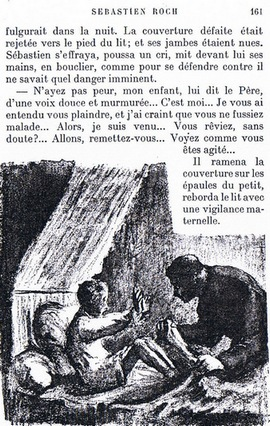
Sébastien Roch, illustrated by Henri-Gabriel Ibels, 1906

=== Novels ===
- Le Calvaire (1886) (Calvary, New York, 1922).
- L'Abbé Jules (1888) (Abbé Jules, Sawtry, Dedalus, 1996).
- Sébastien Roch (1890) (Sébastien Roch, Sawtry, Dedalus, 2000).
- Dans le ciel (1892–1893) (In the Sky).
- Le Jardin des supplices (1899) (Torture Garden, New York, 1931; The Garden of Tortures, London, 1938) .
- Le Journal d'une femme de chambre (1900) (A Chambermaid's Diary, New York, 1900; The Diary of a Lady's Maid, London, 1903; Célestine, Being the Diary of a Chambermaid, New York, 1930; Diary of a Chambermaid, New York, 1945).
- Les Vingt et un Jours d'un neurasthénique (1901).
- Dingo (novel) (1913).
- Un gentilhomme (1919).
- Les Mémoires de mon ami (1920).
- Œuvre romanesque, 3 volumes, Buchet/Chastel – Société Octave Mirbeau, 2000–2001, 4 000 pages. Website of Éditions du Boucher, 2003–2004.

=== Theatre ===
- Les Mauvais bergers (The Bad Shepherds) (1897).
- Les affaires sont les affaires (1903) (Business Is Business, New York, 1904).
- Farces et moralités, six morality plays (1904) (Scruples, New York, 1923; The Epidemic, Bloomington, 1949; The Lovers, translation coming soon).
- Le Foyer (1908) (Charity).
- Dialogues tristes, Eurédit, 1905.

=== Short stories ===
- Dans l'antichambre (Histoire d'une Minute) (1905).
- La Mort de Balzac (1889).
- Contes cruels, 2 volumes (1890 and 1900).
- Contes drôles (1895).
- Mémoire pour un avocat (2007).

=== Art chronicles ===
- Combats esthétiques, 2 volumes (1893).
- Premières chroniques esthétiques (1895).
- Combats littéraires (1906).

=== Travelogues ===
- La 628-E8 (1907) (Sketches of a journey, London, 1989).

=== Political and social chronicles ===
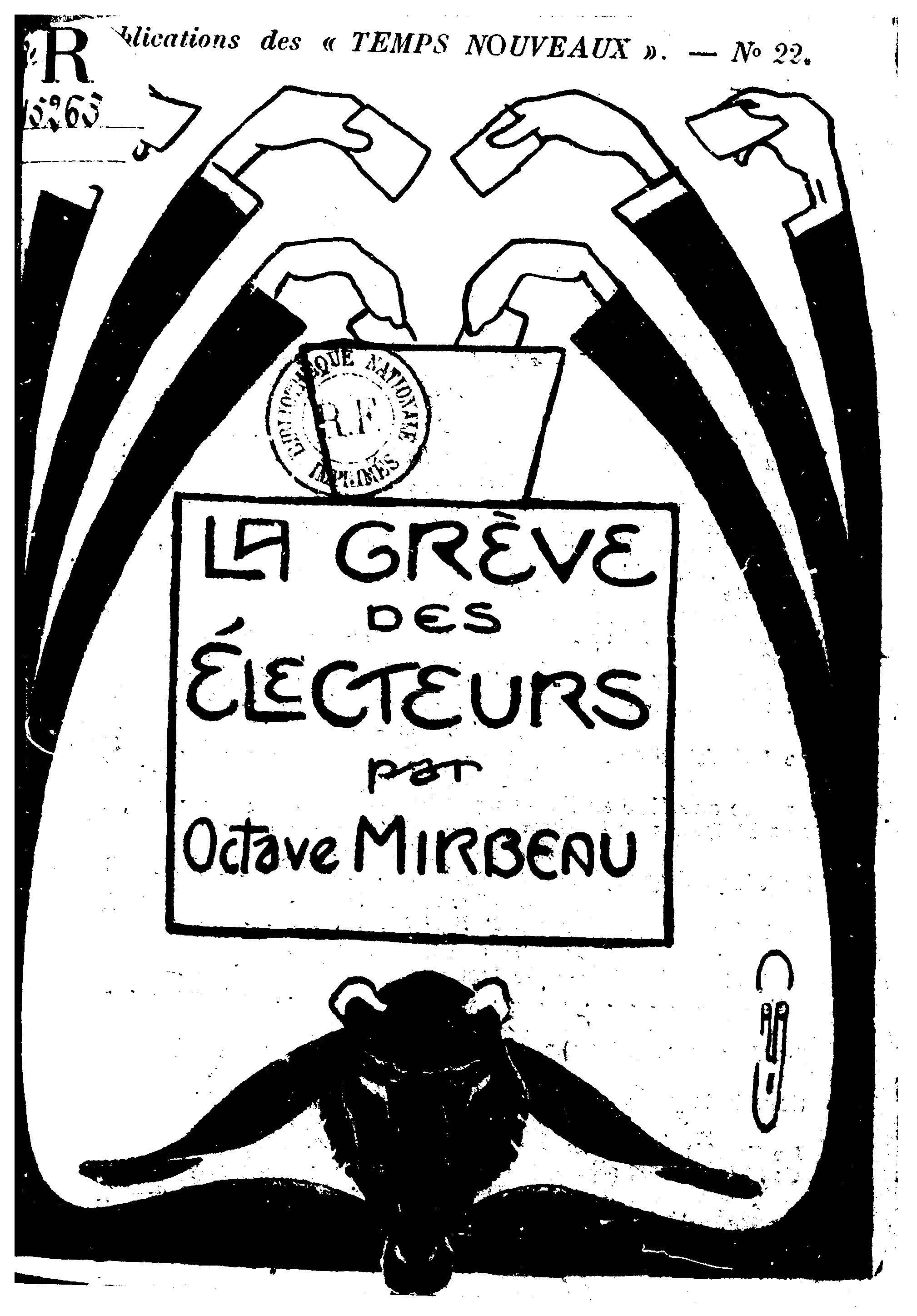

- Voters strike (1888)
- Combats politiques (1890).
- L'Affaire Dreyfus (1891).
- Lettres de l'Inde (1891).
- L'Amour de la femme vénale (1894).
- Chroniques du Diable (1895).
- Interpellations (1911).

=== Correspondence ===
- Lettres à Alfred Bansard des Bois (1989)
- Correspondance avec Rodin (1988), avec Monet (1990), avec Pissarro (1990), avec Jean Grave (1994), avec Jules Huret (2009).
- Correspondance générale, 3 volumes already published (2003-2005-2009).

== Bibliography ==
- Reginald Carr, Anarchism in France - The Case of Octave Mirbeau, Manchester University Press, 1977. ISBN 9780719006685
- Pierre Michel and Jean-François Nivet, Octave Mirbeau, l'imprécateur au cœur fidèle, Séguier, 1990, 1020 pages.
- Pierre Michel, Les Combats d'Octave Mirbeau, Annales littéraires de l'université de Besançon, 1995, 386 pages.
- Christopher Lloyd, Mirbeau's fictions, Durham, 1996.
- Enda McCaffrey, Octave Mirbeau’s literary intellectual evolution as a french writer (1880-1914), Edwin Mellen Press, 2000, 246 pages.
- Pierre Michel, Lucidité, désespoir et écriture, Presses de l'Université d'Angers (2001).
- Samuel Lair, Mirbeau et le mythe de la nature, Presses universitaires de Rennes, 2004, 361 pages.
- Pierre Michel Octave Mirbeau et le roman, Société Octave Mirbeau, 2005, 276 pages.
- Pierre Michel Bibliographie d'Octave Mirbeau, Société Octave Mirbeau, 2009, 713 pages.
- Pierre Michel Albert Camus et Octave Mirbeau, Société Octave Mirbeau, Angers, 2005, 68 pages.
- Pierre Michel Jean-Paul Sartre et Octave Mirbeau, Société Octave Mirbeau, Angers, 2005, 67 pages.
- Pierre Michel, Octave Mirbeau, Henri Barbusse et l'enfer, 51 pages.
- Robert Ziegler, The Nothing Machine : The Fiction of Octave Mirbeau, Rodopi, Amsterdam – Kenilworth, September 2007.
- Samuel Lair, Octave Mirbeau l'iconoclaste, L'Harmattan, 2008.
- Yannick Lemarié - Pierre Michel, Dictionnaire Octave Mirbeau, L'Age d'Homme, 2011, 1,200 p.
- Anita Staron, L'Art romanesque d'Octave Mirbeau - Thèmes et techniques, Wydawnictwo Uniwersytetu Lodzkiego, 2014, 298 p.
- Cahiers Octave Mirbeau, n° 1 to n° 21, 1994–2014, 7 700 pages.
