= Sébastien Roch (novel) =

1890 novel by Octave Mirbeau

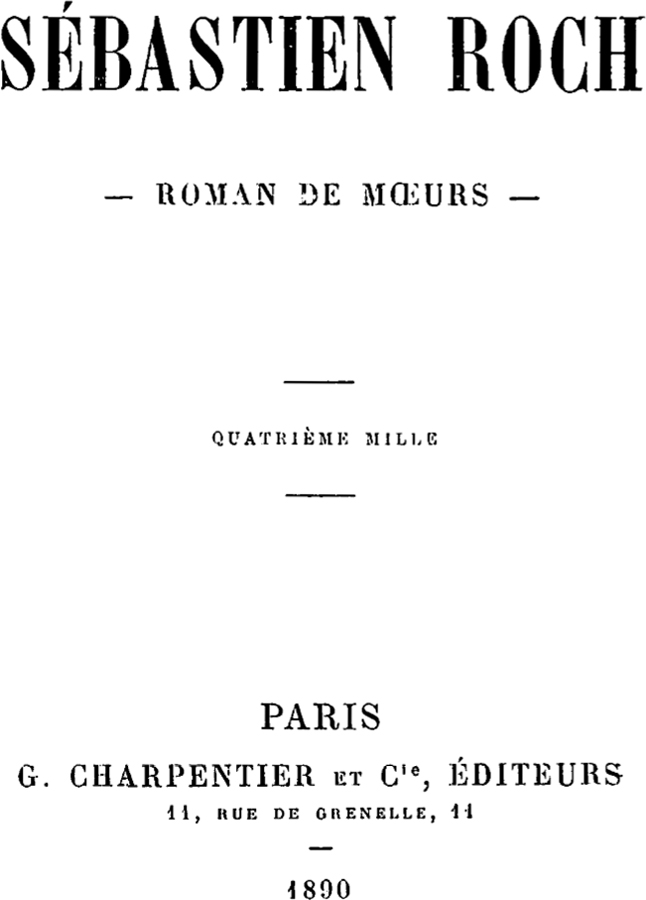
- Author: Octave Mirbeau
- Original title: Sébastien Roch
- Language: French
- Subject: child sexual abuse by priests
- Genre: Novel
- Publisher: Charpentier
- Publication date: April 1890
- Publication place: France
- OCLC: 23394078

Sébastien Roch is a novel written by the French journalist, novelist and playwright Octave Mirbeau, and published by Charpentier in 1890. Last French edition : L'Age d'Homme, 2011.

English translation : Sébastien Roch, Dedalus, « Empire of the senses », 2000, 266 pages (ISBN 1873982437).

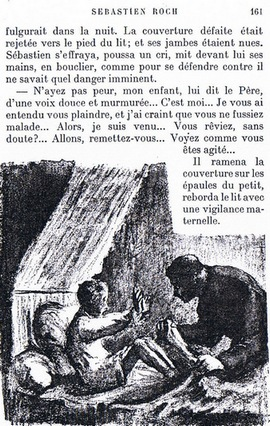
Illustration by Henri-Gabriel Ibels, 1906

== Plot summary ==
That is the emotional story of "the murder of a child’s soul" by a Jesuit priest, a teacher at the private school for boys of Saint-François-Xavier in Vannes, Brittany, where Mirbeau spent four painful years as a pupil, before being expelled, at the age of fifteen, in suspicious circumstances.

At age eleven, Sébastien is sent to boarding school by his father, an ironmonger and terrible snob. The boy does not fit into the school and its aristocratic and wealthy students. He is ignored by nearly everyone until an abusive priest starts to befriend him. The innocent 13-year-old boy is seduced, then sexually abused, by Father de Kern. Sébastien is expelled along with his only friend Bolorec, the boys having been accused of indulging in inappropriate sexual acts. The charges have been trumped up by Father de Kern.

Sébastien's life is ruined and he is unable to hold down a job or make friends. He cannot even build a relationship with Marguerite, his childhood sweetheart. Aged twenty one, Sébastien is absurdly killed during the 1870 Franco-Prussian War, his body being carried from the battlefield by Bolorec.

== Commentary ==
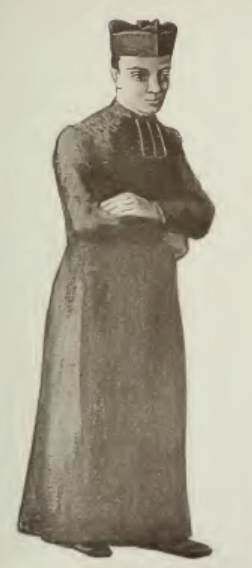
De Kern, seen by Henri-Gabriel Ibels, 1906

Octave Mirbeau denounces the child sexual abuses and the impunity of the rapists, especially when they are priests: for the first time, he breaks a lasting taboo.

But, for him, what is called education, within the context of family, school and church, is also a dangerous violation of the child's mind. Rather than a Bildungsroman, a novel of self-cultivation, Sébastien Roch is a novel of self-destruction.
