= Janine Bailly-Herzberg =

French art historian

Janine Bailly-Herzberg (1920–2005) was a French art historian, specialising in 19th-century art.

== Author ==
Bailly-Herzberg was an author as well. Her book Pissarro et Paris was published in 1992 by Flammarion. She also co-wrote L'eau-forte de Peintre Au Dix-neuvième Siècle: La Société Des Aquafortistes 1862–1867, published in 1972 by Leonce Laget; Correspondence of Camille Pissarro: 1886–1890, published by University Presses of France; and Daubigny, which was published in 1975 by publishers Éditions Geoffroy-Dechaume.

Her Dictionnaire de l'estampe en France, 1830–1950 is a 384-page-long dictionary published by Flammarion in 1985.

== Biography ==
Janine Bailly-Herzberg is the author of Etching de peintre au 19th century : la Société des aquafortistes (1862–1867) published by Laget in two volumes in 1972: the fruit of her doctoral thesis and many years of research, this work sheds new light on the work of Alfred Cadart and his friends, and on the Etching revival.

In 1985, she published a reference work, Dictionnaire de Printmaking en France (1830–1950), with a preface by Michel Melot (Arts et métiers graphiques / Flammarion). She is also the editor of the Correspondance de Camille Pissarro published by Presses Universitaires de France (1980–1991) and presented by Bernard Dorival, followed by Lettres de Ludovic Piette à Pissarro (1985).

On his death, his archives and working documents on the history of printmaking were entrusted to the Bibliothèque nationale de France for research.
