= Lettres de l'Inde =

Book by Octave Mirbeau

Octave Mirbeau’s Lettres de l’Inde (Letters from India) are a series of eleven articles that appeared in 1885, first in Le Gaulois between February 22 and April 22, and then in Le Journal des débats, on July 31 and April 1. Signed under the pseudonym Nirvana, they were not collected in a volume until 1991.

== Literary hoax ==
Given that Mirbeau never set foot in India, his work is nothing more than a masterful literary hoax. It was actually in Paris that Mirbeau wrote the first seven letters, centering on Ceylon and Pondicherry, and then in the Orne, near L'Aigle, where, while contemplating the rhododendrons of Normandy, he pictured in the last four letters the twelve-meter high rhododendrons of the Himalayas, glimpsed in an apocryphal trek across Sikkim.

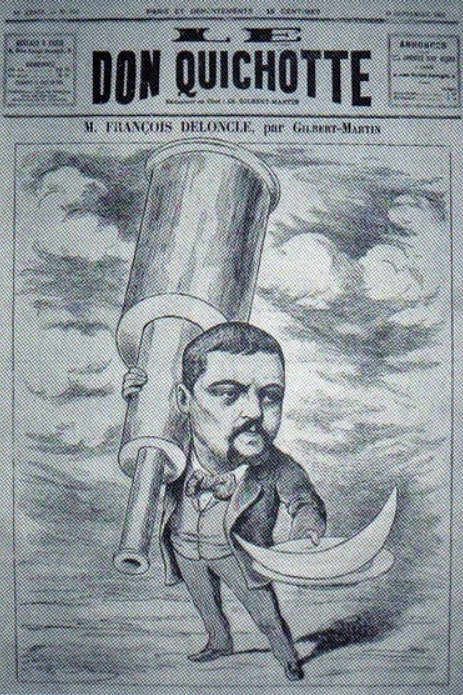
Cartoon of François Deloncle, Le Don Quichotte, 11 September 1892

Mirbeau’s original motivation had been to outdo Gaulois journalist Robert de Bonnières, in Mirbeau's view a pretentious man of the world who himself had undertaken a genuine journey through India, from which he had sent back his travel memories, first published in La Revue bleue and then collected in 1880 as Mémoires d’aujourd’hui (Memoirs of Today). However, Mirbeau's text is also a ghost-written work written out of financial necessity, as he set in literary form, embellishing and enlivening them, dispatches by his friend François Deloncle, who had been sent on an official mission to India by Jules Ferry. These reports have been preserved in the archives of the Ministry of Foreign Affairs.

== A good colonialism ? ==
A true member of the literary proletariat, Octave Mirbeau, at the time, still did not enjoy the freedom to publish under his own name, continuing to write under the “influence” of others. The future critic of colonialism who would picture entire continents as terrifying “torture gardens”, was still compelled to contrast the “good” colonialism of the French, professing respect for foreign peoples and their cultures, with the “bad” colonialism of the English, with their cynical oppression of the peoples of India.

Beyond having to compromise the integrity of his views for these reasons, Mirbeau was still aware of the upheavals looming in the East. In the book, Mirbeau reveals his fascination for Indian civilization, rooted in detachment, renunciation of material attachments, and stillness of the mind. Mirbeau was similarly interested in Cingalese Buddhism, which he presents as a religion without God and that could liberate man’s thinking and rid it of fanaticism.
