= Charles-Louis Philippe =

French novelist

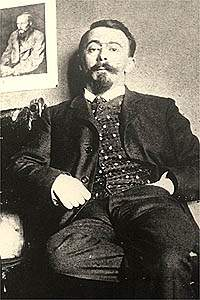
Charles-Louis Philippe

Charles-Louis Philippe (French pronunciation: [ʃaʁl lwi filip]; 4 August 1874 – 21 December 1909) was a French novelist.

== Life ==
Son of a village clogmaker, Charles-Louis Philippe rose from his modest background first to secondary education via a grant, then to the world of letters. However, he remained attached to the class of his birth. He wrote to the bourgeois writer and politician Maurice Barrès...

My grandmother was a beggar, my father, who was a proud child, begged before he was old enough to work for his bread. I belong to a generation which has not yet passed through the world of books.... I must remind you that there are in me more imperative truths than those you call "French truths". You separate nationalities, that's how you differentiate the world, but I separate by class.... We have been walled up like the poor, and sometimes when Life came knocking, it was carrying a big stick. Our only resource was to love each other. That's why my writing is always more tender than my head tells me to write. I think I am in France the first person from a race of the poor to enter the world of literature.

Philippe passed the Baccalaureat in science in 1891, but failed in his attempts to enter the specialist colleges in Paris (École polytechnique, École centrale). He eventually obtained a modest office job in the administration of Paris, which allowed him to settle in the capital and pursue his vocation as a writer. Among his literary friends and admirers would be Paul Claudel, Léon-Paul Fargue, André Gide, Jean Giraudoux, Francis Jammes, Valery Larbaud.

== Works ==
After a short period writing poetry, he turned to fiction, publishing a collection of overheated tales of "poor love" (Quatre histoires de pauvre amour, 1897), then two sentimental portraits of village girls (La bonne Madeleine et la pauvre Marie, 1898), and a lyrical evocation of his own childhood and youth (La Mère et l'enfant, 1900). A brief liaison with a prostitute inspired his best-known novel, Bubu de Montparnasse (1901), which earned him critical as well as popular attention. A provincial novel followed: Le Père Perdrix (1902) recounts the painful old age of a blacksmith and explores the small-town class system. Marie Donadieu (1904) returns to Paris to tell a passionate love story tinged with individualism inspired by Nietzsche. Croquignole (1906) evokes the stifling office atmosphere Philippe knew well, and which his hero escapes, but briefly, through an inheritance.

Despite some strong support (notably from Octave Mirbeau), the last three novels failed to win the new Prix Goncourt. He turned next to a fictionalised life of his father (Charles Blanchard), but abandoned what was to be a kind of hymn to work shortly before his sudden death, from meningitis, in December 1909. In his last years he had also written 50 entertaining short stories for a large-circulation Paris paper, Le Matin, which were published in volume form after his death (Dans la petite ville, 1910, Les Contes du Matin, 1916).

Thanks to the efforts of Gide, other occasional writings and two volumes of letters were published between 1911 and 1928 : Lettres de jeunesse (1911), Chroniques du Canard sauvage (1923), Lettres à sa mère (1928).

L'Association internationale des Amis de Charles-Louis Philippe has existed since 1935 to promote knowledge of his life and work through an annual bulletin.

== Availability of Philippe's works ==
Most of Philippe's works listed above are still readily available in French. Although three novels, Bubu de Montparnasse, Le Père Perdrix and Marie Donadieu, have been published in English translations, all are long out of print. Although T. S. Eliot wrote the preface to the first English translation of Bubu de Montparnasse, little has been published on Philippe in English, and nothing in book form.

- Bubu of Montparnasse, Charles-Louis Philippe translated by Laurence Vail, with a preface by T. S. Eliot, Crosby Continental Editions, Paris (1932). New Edition, Shakespeare House, New York (1951).

== Philippe in English (or English translation) ==
- Georg Lukács, translated by Anna Bostock, Soul and Form, The Merlin Press Ltd, The UK (January 1, 1991), 978–0850362510.
- Georg Lukács, translated by Anna Bostock, Soul and Form; New Edition with an Introduction by Judith Butler, John T. Sanders and Katie Terezakis (Editors), Columbia University Press, New York (January 19, 2010) 978–0231149815.
- Georg Lukács, translated by Anna Bostock, The Theory of the Novel, The Forms of Great Epic Literature examined in Relation to Whether the General Civilisation of the Time is an Integrated or a Problematic One; The Merlin Press Ltd, The UK (reprint 2000–1962), ISBN 0-85036-236-9. A Historical-Philosophical Essay on the Forms of Great Epic Literature, first published in 1914; in The Chapter II, The Problems of a Philosophy of the History of Forms, the Philosopher quotes briefly his Soul and Form on Philippe's Works by these words : "once, speaking of Charles-Louis Philippe, I called such a form chantefable"; (Free Source: marxists.org).
- Georg Lukács, translated by Anna Bostock, The Theory of the Novel; New Edition, The MIT Press, Cambridge, MA (January 15, 1974) 978–0262620277.

Other contributions:

- Grover Smith (Yale University), Charles-Louis Philippe and T.S. Eliot, Duke University Press, (1950); Online JSTOR Archive.
- Gene J. Barberet (University of Connecticut), André Gide and Charles-Louis Philippe, American Association of Teachers of French (1955); Online JSTOR Archive.
- Gene J. Barberet, Charles-Louis Philippe, Fifty Years After, Board of Regents of the University of Oklahoma (1960); Online JSTOR Archive.
