= Les Vingt et un Jours d'un neurasthénique =

Novel written by Octave Mirbeau

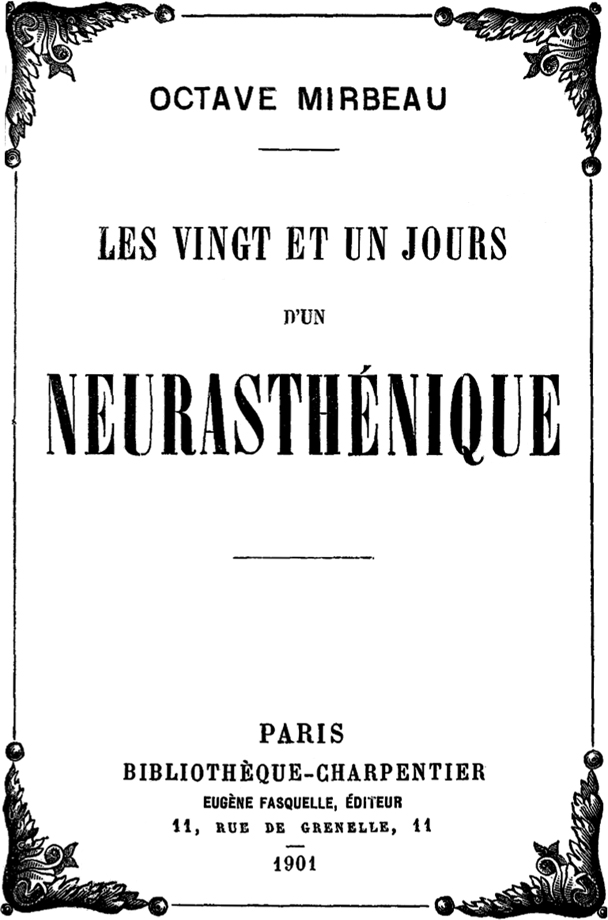

Les Vingt et un Jours d'un neurasthénique is an expressionist novel by the French writer Octave Mirbeau, published by Charpentier-Fasquelle in August 1901.

== Commentary ==
It's a collage of fifty cruel tales already published in the press over the previous fifteen years. So Mirbeau unsettles traditional novelistic conventions, transgressing the code of fictional credibility and maintaining indeterminacy of its genre affiliation.

A fictionalized rendering of the author’s sojourn a few years before at the Pyrenean spa of Luchon, the novel mirrors a vagrant plot in its episodic narrative. Mirbeau’s narrator, Georges Vasseur, moves from observation to recollection, traveling from sanitarium to insane asylum and finally to the desolate mountain retreat of a misanthropic friend, who propounds his philosophy of nihilism and decries the futility of art.

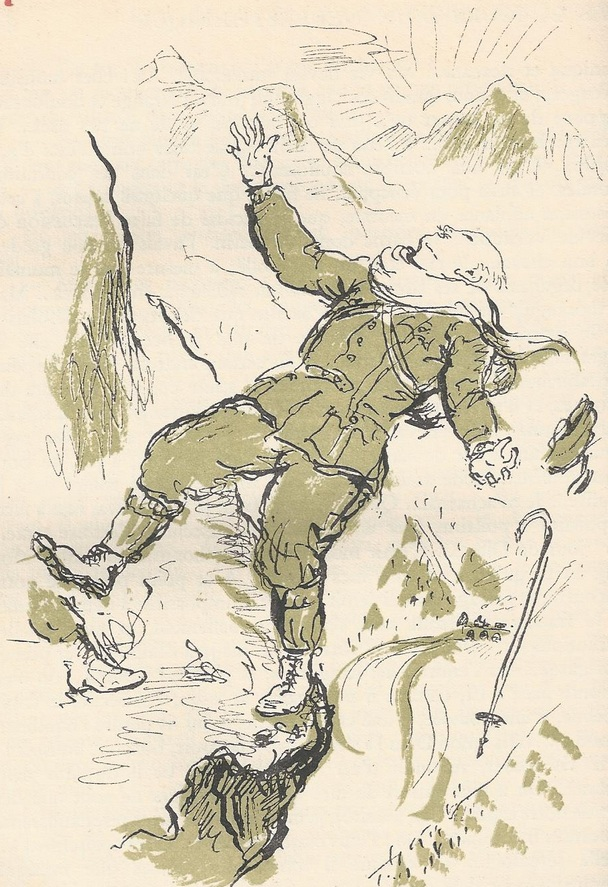
Illustration by Jean Launois, 1935

In his peripatetic narrative, Mirbeau casts a glaring light on the defective human animal, who tries to compensate for his susceptibility to the most humiliating bodily afflictions by asserting scientific mastery of the dangerous world he tries to navigate. Mirbeau combines attacks on colonialism, psychiatry, the politics of intolerance with a rehabitation of man, deemed precious for his very unknowability. While doctors, bureaucrats, and billionaires try to overcome their sense of ontological uncertainty, using X-ray technology, money, or ideological fanaticism, Mirbeau suggests life’s value consists in its unprecitability. Opposing the pretentiousness of science, the deathliness of knowledge systems, Mirbeau invokes the vitality of an art of exploration and creative conjecture.

The French society of the Third Republic is presented as a completely mad world in the novel, where everything is out of justice, order and reason.

English translation by Justin Vicari : 21 Days of a Neurasthenic, Columbia University Press, Dalkey Archive Press, 2014.
