= Cahiers Octave Mirbeau =

French literary journal

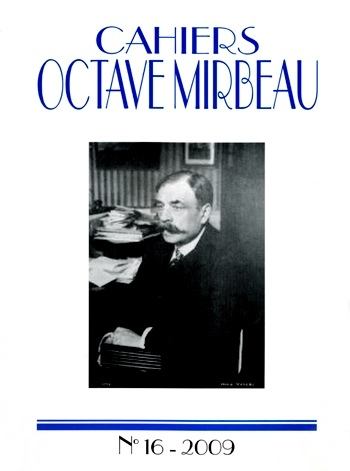
- Founder: Pierre Michel
- Editor-in-chief: Pierre Michel
- Editor: Claude Herzfeld
- Founded: 1994
- Language: French
- Headquarters: Angers
- Circulation: 500
- ISSN: 1254-6879
- Website: Société Octave Mirbeau

Cahiers Octave Mirbeau is a French literary journal founded in 1994 by French scholar and Octave Mirbeau specialist Pierre Michel.

The journal is based in Angers, France. Its periodicity is annual. Between May 1994 and March 2016, 23 installments were released, totaling more than 8 300 pages. Volumes comprise between 304 and 440 pages and are lavishly illustrated. The circulation is 500 to 600 copies.

Each volume divides into at least three major parts. The first is devoted to studies on Octave Mirbeau's literary or aesthetic and political battles. The second includes unpublished or little known documents (unpublished articles by Mirbeau such as correspondence, judgments, testimonies, and translations). The third is a bibliography listing studies and articles devoted to Mirbeau. It reports on the numerous books relating to his time. Some numbers contain a fourth part devoted to contemporary testimonies.
