= The Torture Garden =

Novel by Octave Mirbeau

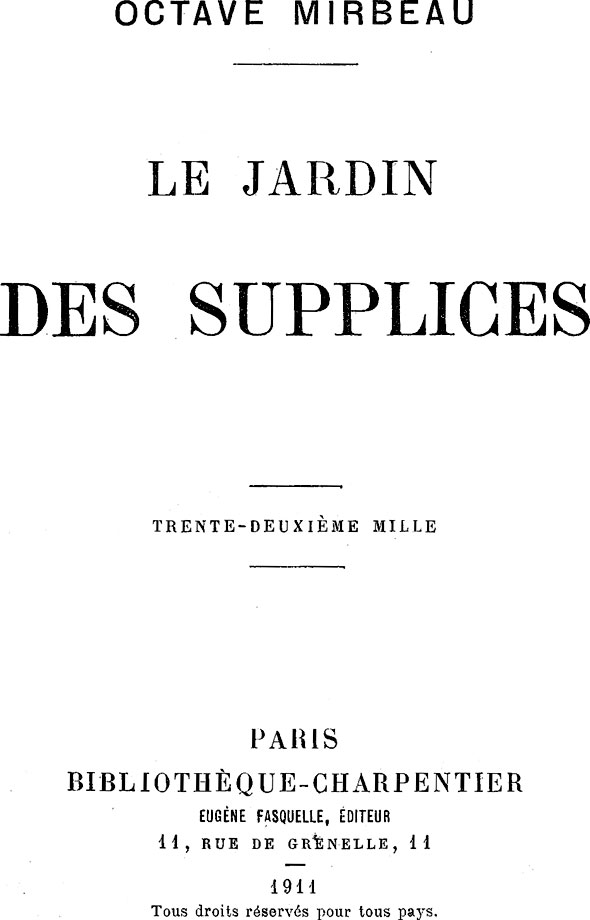
- Author: Octave Mirbeau
- Original title: Le Jardin des supplices
- Language: French
- Genre: Decadent novel
- Publisher: Fasquelle
- Publication date: 1899
- Publication place: France

The Torture Garden (French: Le Jardin des supplices) is a novel written by the French journalist, novelist and playwright Octave Mirbeau, and was first published in 1899 during the Dreyfus affair. The novel is dedicated: "To the priests, the soldiers, the judges, to those people who educate, instruct and govern men, I dedicate these pages of Murder and Blood."

== Plot summary ==
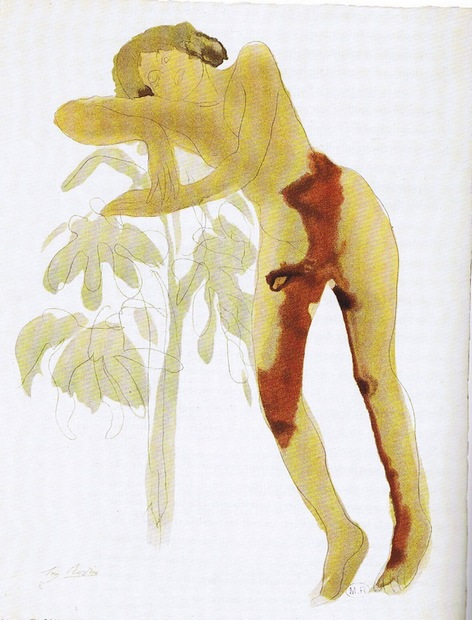
Auguste Rodin, litho for Le Jardin des supplices, Ambroise Vollard, 1902

Published at the height of the Dreyfus affair, Mirbeau's novel is a loosely assembled reworking of texts composed at different eras, featuring different styles, and showcasing different characters. Beginning with material stemming from articles on the 'Law of Murder' discussed in the "Frontispiece" ("The Manuscript"), the novel continues with a farcical critique of French politics with "En Mission" ("The Mission"): a French politician's aide is sent on a pseudo-scientific expedition to China when his presence at home would be compromising. It then moves on to an account of a visit to a Cantonese prison by a narrator accompanied by the sadist and hysteric Clara, who delights in witnessing flayings, crucifixions and numerous tortures, all done in beautifully laid out and groomed gardens, and explaining the beauty of torture to her companion. Finally she attains hysterical orgasm and passes out in exhaustion, only to begin again a few days later.

== Quotations ==
- Woman possesses the cosmic force of an element, an invincible force of destruction, like nature's. She is, in herself alone, all nature! Being the matrix of life, she is by that very fact the matrix of death - since it is from death that life is perpetually reborn, and since to annihilate death would be to kill life at its only fertile source. ~"The Manuscript"
- To take something from a person and keep it for oneself: that is robbery. To take something from one person and then turn it over to another in exchange for as much money as you can get: that is business. Robbery is so much more stupid, since it is satisfied with a single, frequently dangerous profit; whereas in business it can be doubled without danger. ~"The Mission," Chapter 2
- There is only one trait which is irreparable in a statesman: honesty! Honesty is negative and sterile; it is ignorant of the correct evaluation of appetite and ambition - the only powers through which you can found anything durable. ~"The Mission," Chapter 3
- You're obliged to pretend respect for people and institutions you think absurd. You live attached in a cowardly fashion to moral and social conventions you despise, condemn, and know lack all foundation. It is that permanent contradiction between your ideas and desires and all the dead formalities and vain pretenses of your civilization which makes you sad, troubled and unbalanced. In that intolerable conflict you lose all joy of life and all feeling of personality, because at every moment they suppress and restrain and check the free play of your powers. That's the poisoned and mortal wound of the civilized world. ~"The Mission," Chapter 8 (This passage is quoted in the liner notes of the 1994 Manic Street Preachers album The Holy Bible.)
- Alas, the gates of life never swing open except upon death, never open except upon the palaces and gardens of death. And the universe appears to me like an immense, inexorable torture-garden. Blood everywhere and, where there is most life, horrible tormentors who dig your flesh, saw your bones, and retract your skin with sinister, joyful faces. ~"The Garden," Chapter 9
- Ah, yes! the Torture Garden! Passions, appetites, greed, hatred, and lies; law, social institutions, justice, love, glory, heroism, and religion: these are its monstrous flowers and its hideous instruments of eternal human suffering. What I saw today, and what I heard, is no more than a symbol to me of the entire earth. I have vainly sought a respite in quietude and repose in death, and I can find them nowhere. ~"The Garden," Chapter 9

== Translations ==
- The first Spanish translation, by Ramon Sempau and C. Sos Gautreau, is of 1900 (El Jardín de los suplicios, Barcelona, Casa Editorial Maucci).
- The book was translated into English and published in 1903.
- The Italian translation of Jardin des supplices, by Decio Cinti, is of 1917 (Il Giardino dei supplizi, Milan, Sonzogno).

== Film adaptation ==
A film version of The Torture Garden was released in 1976; it was directed by Christian Gion from a screenplay by French academic/novelist Pascal Lainé and starred Roger Van Hool, Jacqueline Kerry, Tony Taffin, Jean Rougeul, and Jean-Claude Carrière. In its native France, the film retained the title Le Jardin des supplices; it was released in the UK as The Garden of Torment. In January 2021, the UK-based independent DVD and Blu-ray distribution label Nucleus Films announced it was preparing a Blu-ray release of The Garden of Torment for 2021.

The 1967 British horror film Torture Garden is unrelated to Mirbeau's novel.

== Other adaptations ==
The name for the John Zorn's album Torture Garden comes from Le jardin des supplices.
