= Léon Werth =

French writer and art critic

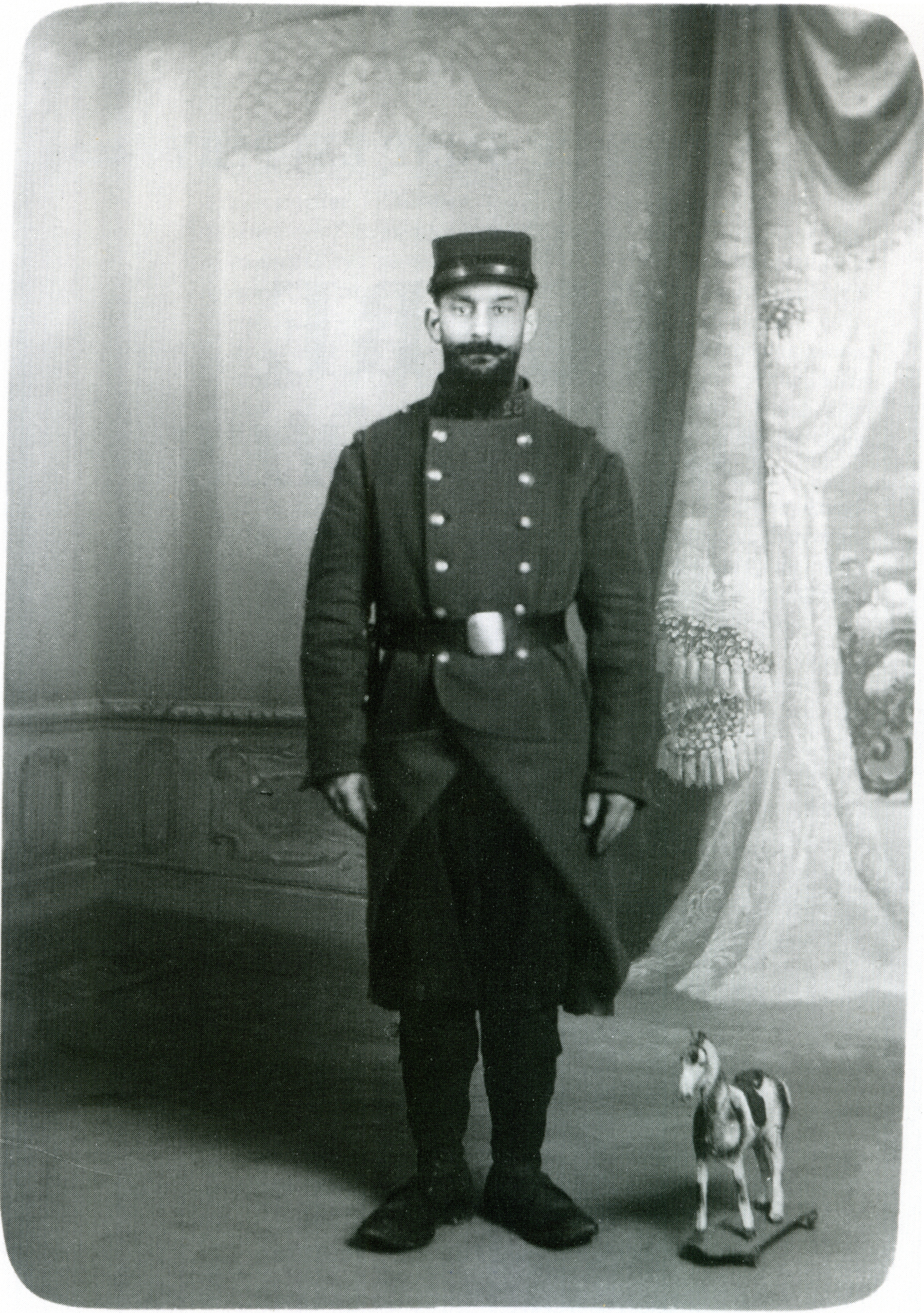
Werth in 1914 in a military uniform

Léon Werth (French pronunciation: [leɔ̃ vɛʁt]; 17 February 1878 in Remiremont, Vosges – 13 December 1955 in Paris) was a French writer and art critic, a friend of Octave Mirbeau and a close friend and confidant of Antoine de Saint-Exupéry.

Léon Werth wrote critically and with great precision on French society through World War I, colonization, and on French collaboration during World War II.

== Early life ==
Werth was born in 1878 in the Remiremont, Vosges, in an assimilated Jewish family. His father, Stefan, was a draper and his mother, Jovana, was the sister of the philosopher Frédéric Rauh.

He was a brilliant student, a Grand Prize winner in France's Concours général and a literary and humanities CPGE philosophy student at Lycée Henri-IV. However, he abandoned his studies to become a columnist in various magazines. Leading a bohemian life, he devoted himself to writing and art criticism.

== Career ==
Werth was a protégé and friend of Octave Mirbeau, the author of the 1900 novel The Diary of a Chambermaid, completing Mirabeau's final novel, Dingo, for him when the author's health failed. He manifested his anti-clericalism as an independently minded anti-bourgeois anarchist. His first significant novel, La Maison blanche, which Mirabeau prefaced, was a Prix Goncourt finalist in 1913.

At the outbreak of the First World War, Werth, 34, having earlier completed his active-duty and reserve service, was mobilized into the territorial army and, as such, assigned to the rear. Despite opposing the war, he volunteered for combat duty first as a rifleman then as a radio operator, spending time in one of the worst sectors of the war before being invalided out by a lung infection after 15 months' service. Shortly after, he completed Clavel, soldat, a pessimistic and virulently anti-war work that caused a scandal when it was released in 1919 but which was later cited as among the most faithful depictions of trench warfare in Jean Norton Cru's monumental 1929 survey of French World War I literature.

Werth was an unclassifiable writer with an acid prose, who wrote of the inter-war period as well as advocating against colonialism (Cochinchine, 1928). He also wrote against the colonial period splendor of the French empire, and against Stalinism which he denounced as a leftist deception. He also criticized the mounting Nazi movement.

In 1931 when he met Antoine de Saint-Exupéry, it was the beginning of a very close friendship. Saint-Exupéry's Le Petit Prince (The Little Prince) would be dedicated to Werth.

After the Fall of France, during its occupation, the Werths remained in France despite offers by the Centre americain de secours in Marseille to help them emigrate. In July 1941 Werth was required to register as Jewish, his travel was restricted and his works banned from publication. His wife, Suzanne, was active in the Resistance, crossing the demarcation line clandestinely more than a dozen times and establishing their Paris apartment as a safe house for fugitive Jewish women, downed British and Canadian pilots, secret resistance meetings and storage of false identity papers and illegal radio transmitters. Their son, Claude, continued his studies first in the Jura and then in Paris, later becoming a doctor. Werth lived poorly in the Jura Mountain region, alone, cold and often hungry. Déposition, his diary, was published in 1946, delivering a damning indictment of Vichy France. He became a Gaullist under the Nazi occupation and after the war contributed to the Liberté de l'Esprit intellectual magazine run by Claude Mauriac.

Werth had regularly contributed to magazines, particularly Marianne.

== Antoine de Saint-Exupéry ==
Saint-Exupéry met Werth in 1931. Werth soon became Saint-Exupéry's closest friend outside of the flying group of his Aeropostale associates. Werth did not have much in common with Saint-Exupéry; he was an anarchist, and his father was a Jew and a leftist Bolshevik supporter. Being twenty-two years older than Saint-Exupéry, with a surrealistic writing style as well as the author of twelve volumes and many magazine pieces, he was Saint-Exupéry's very opposite. But the younger author admired Werth's writing for having "never deceived", and wrote that Werth's essence was "his search for truth, his observation and the simple utility of his prose". Saint-Exupéry's Letter to a Hostage includes a celebration of Werth's journalism, and in her note on the text, Françoise Gerbod, professor emeritus of French literature at the University of Paris, credits Werth with having been Saint-Exupéry's literary mentor.

Saint-Exupéry dedicated two books to him (Letter to a Hostage and The Little Prince), and referred to Werth in three more of his works. At the beginning of the Second World War, while writing The Little Prince, Saint-Exupéry lived in his downtown New York City apartment, thinking about his native France and his friends. Léon Werth spent the war unobtrusively in Saint-Amour, his village in the Jura, a mountainous region near Switzerland where he "was alone, cold and hungry", and which had few nice words for French refugees. Saint-Exupéry returned to the conflict by joining the Free French Air Force in early 1943, rationalizing, "I cannot bear to be far from those who are hungry... I am leaving in order to suffer and thereby be united with those who are dear to me".

At the end of the Second World War, which Antoine de Saint-Exupéry didn't live to see, Léon Werth said: "Peace, without Tonio [Saint-Exupéry], isn't entirely peace". Léon Werth did not see the text for which he was so responsible until five months after his friend's death, when Saint-Exupéry's French publisher, Gallimard, sent him a special edition. Werth died in Paris on 13 December 1955. His remains and those of his wife, Suzanne, are deposited in the columbarium at Paris's Père Lachaise cemetery.

== The Little Prince dedication ==
Werth is mentioned in the preamble to The Little Prince, where Saint-Exupéry dedicates the book to him:

To Leon Werth
I ask children to forgive me for dedicating this book to a grown-up. I have a serious excuse: this grown-up is the best friend I have in the world. I have another excuse: this grown-up can understand everything, even books for children. I have a third excuse: he lives in France where he is hungry and cold. He needs to be comforted. If all these excuses are not enough then I want to dedicate this book to the child whom this grown-up once was. All grown-ups were children first. (But few of them remember it.) So I correct my dedication:

To Leon Werth,
When he was a little boy

Saint-Exupéry's aircraft disappeared over the Mediterranean in July 1944. The following month, Werth learned of his friend's disappearance from a radio broadcast. Without having yet heard of The Little Prince, in November, Werth discovered that Saint-Exupéry had published a fable the previous year in the United States, which he had illustrated himself, and that it was dedicated to Werth.

== 33 jours posthumous publication ==
33 jours (33 Days) is Werth's memoir of l'exode (the exodus) during the Fall of France. The title refers to the period of time he, his wife and their son's former nanny spent on the road during their flight from Paris to their summer home in Saint-Amour in the Jura Mountains region. (His son Claude, then 15, and teenage friends covered the distance in less than a day by leaving several hours earlier, thus avoiding the detours mandated by the French army that are described in 33 jours; the couple had no news of their son until they were all reunited a month later in Saint-Amour.) With poetic economy and journalistic precision, Werth recounts his experiences as one of the estimated eight million civilians who fled the advancing German army's invasion of Holland, Belgium, Luxembourg and France in May–June 1940, possibly using notes set down during the event, as he did in the trenches in World War I (which he used for his novels Clavel soldat and Clavel chez les majors). Werth gave the manuscript to his friend Saint-Exupéry in October 1940 to smuggle out of France, write a preface for and publish in the U.S. The New York publisher Brentano's bought the rights (for a military parcel of cigarettes, gum, chocolates and water-purification tablets) and publication was planned for 1943, in expectation of which Saint-Exupéry referred to it as "un grand livre" (an important book) in his 1942 novel Pilote de guerre. For reasons unclear it was never published, and the manuscript effectively disappeared.

When Saint-Exupéry realized that an English translation of 33 jours was not forthcoming, he extensively revised the preface (excising Werth's name to protect him) and published it as a stand-alone essay. Letter to a Hostage is an affecting meditation on home and exile set during the escape from France via Lisbon to the U.S. (he was on the same vessel as Jean Renoir) that enabled the pilot to continue his struggle against the Germans from abroad.

It was not until 1992 that Viviane Hamy found and published the missing manuscript. In 2002 a student edition was produced, and 33 jours became part of the syllabus in French secondary schools. Hamy led a rediscovery of Werth, republishing many of his works in the 1990s and 2000s. 33 jours was finally published in English in 2015 as 33 Days in a new translation by Austin Denis Johnston.

== Deposition 1940-1944 ==
Three years after 33 Days appeared in English, Oxford University Press published the diary Werth wrote when he reached Saint-Amour after his exodus on the roads, sub-titling it "A Secret Diary of Life in Vichy France." It is translated and annotated by David Ball. Had it not been “secret,” the authorities would have had two reasons for deporting its author to Auschwitz: not only was he Jewish, he was subversive. Deposition is his sharply observed, often ironic, almost daily record of life in the French countryside during the Occupation and, at the end, the insurrection during the liberation of Paris. If he had stayed there, he might have been one of the 50,000 Jews deported from the city and exterminated. Alone in his house, with the habit of writing, no other work, and the obvious impossibility of publishing during the war, he made entries in his diary almost every day: noting what people said, what he saw, and what he heard on the radio and read in the press, often with comments like this: “Monsieur de Gaulle (that’s what the paper calls him) and General Catroux have been stripped of their French nationality.” So has France. (December 12, 1940)

The events “after the fall of France” described above are entered in the diary as they happened. When registering as Jewish, for example, Werth says he sang out the word “Jewish” as if he were singing the Marseillaise. He also uses his gifts as a novelist to give us portraits of the peasants, shopkeepers and railroad workers in and around the village of Saint-Amour. We see what they are like and hear, in their own words, what they think of Vichy—not much, though many trust Pétain—and how it affects their lives. The diary in French is 750 pages, far too long to be assigned in classrooms, but the English edition is less than half as long. It is his most important book in English to date.

Werth returned to Paris in January 1944 but could only venture out at night until just before the Liberation. He describes the activities of a Resistance cell in their apartment: British aviators hid there until they could be smuggled out of the country. Résistants on the run hid out for a few days in their apartment and then set out for a new mission. In August, he reports the exciting advance of the Allied armies toward Paris and during the last week, he reports the street-fighting he saw in Paris during the liberation of the city. The diary ends with his capture of German prisoners huddled on a tank (he pities them), and the triumphal parade of General de Gaulle down the Champs-Élysées.

== Commemorative events ==
Various events were organized in 2005 to commemorate the fiftieth anniversary of Werth's death.

== Books ==
- Puvis de Chavannes (Paris: Portraits d'hier, 1909; Paris: Les Éditions G. Crès & Cie., 1926, collection Peintres et sculpteurs)
- La maison blanche (1913; Paris: Crès, 1924, collection Maîtres et jeunes d'aujourd'hui)
- Cézanne (Paris: Bernheim-Jeune, 1914)
- Meubles Modernes (Esbly: Les Ateliers Modernes, 1914)
- Clavel soldat (Paris: Albin Michel, 1917)
- Clavel chez les majors (Paris: Albin Michel, 1919)
- Voyages avec ma pipe: Bretagne et campagne, Paris, Banlieue, Province, Belgique et Hollande, Europe et Amérique (Paris: Les Éditions G. Crès & Cie., 1920)
- Yvonne et Pijallet, roman (Paris: Albin Michel, 1920)
- Trente tableaux de Vlaminck : [exposition] du 10 au 22 mai 1920, chez MM. Bernheim-jeune et Cie ..., 15, rue Richepance et 25, Bd de la Madeleine, Paris (Paris: Bernheim Jeune, 1920)
- Henri Matisse (Paris: Georges Crès et Cie, 1920, Collection des Cahiers d'aujourd'hui) - with Élie Fuare, Jules Romains, Charles Vildrac
- Les amants invisibles, roman (Paris: Albin Michel, 1921)
- Dix-neuf ans, roman (Paris: Albin Michel, 1922)
- Le monde et la ville (Paris: Les Éditions G. Crès & Cie., 1922)
- Un soir de cirque (1922)
- Bonnard (Paris: G. Crès, 1923, collection Les Cahiers d'aujourd'hui)
- Quelques peintres (Paris: G. Crès, 1923, collection Artistes d'hier et d'aujourd'hui)
- Pijallet danse (Paris: Albin Michel, 1924)
- Dialogue sur la danse (1924-1925)
- Danse, danseurs, dancings (Paris: F. Rieder et Cie., 1925, collection Prosateurs français contemporains)
- Cochinchine (Paris: Rieder, 1926)
- Ghislaine, roman, published in: Les oeuvres libres : recueil littéraire mensuel ne publiant que de l'inédit, vol. 62 (Paris: Fayard, 1926)
- Marthe et Le perroquet (Anvers: Éditions Lumière, 1926)
- Une soirée à L'Olympia (Paris: A la Cité des livres, 1926, collection Alphabet des lettres)
- Chana Ourloff (1927)
- Claude Monet (Paris: G. Crès & Cie, 1928, Collection des Cahiers d'aujourd'hui)
- K.X. Roussel (Paris: Éditions G. Crès & Cie., 1930, Collection Les artistes nouveaux)
- Cour d'assises (Paris: Les Éditions Rieder, 1932, collection Prosateurs français contemporains)
- La peinture et la mode: quarante ans après Cézanne (Paris: Grasset, 1945)
- Déposition : journal, 1940-1944 (Paris: Grasset, 1946)
- Eloge de Pierre Bonnard (Paris: Manuel Bruker, éditeur, 1946)
- Eloge de Albert Marquet (Paris: Manuel Bruker, éditeur, 1948)
- La vie de Saint-Exupéry: Témoignages recueillis et rapportés par René Delange; suivi de Tel que je l'ai connu, par Léon Werth (Paris: Editions du Seuil, 1948)
- Unser Freund Saint-Exupéry (Bad Salzig: Karl Rauch Verlag, 1952) - with René Delange
- 33 jours [Trente-trois jours] (Paris: Viviane Hamy, 1992); English translation: 33 Days: A Memoir, with introduction by Antoine de Saint-Exupéry (Brooklyn: Melville House Publishing, 2015, translated by Austin Denis Johnston).
- Caserne 1900 (Paris: Viviane Hamy, 1993)
- Impressions d'audience : le procès Pétain (Paris: Viviane Hamy, 1995)
