= Pierre Michel =

French professor of literature (1942- )

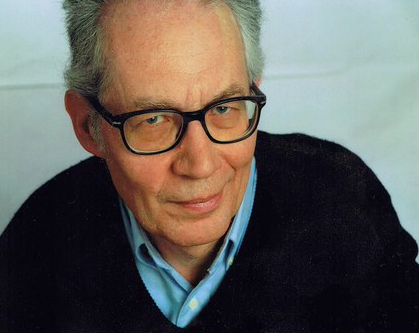
- Born: Pierre Michel; Toulon
- Occupation: Professor
- Writing career
- Language: French

Pierre Michel (born 11 June 1942), is a professor of literature and a scholar specializing in the French writer Octave Mirbeau.

Michel was born in Toulon, the son of the historian Henri Michel.

After defending his doctoral dissertation on the works of Octave Mirbeau at the University of Angers in 1992, Michel founded a year later, the "Société Octave Mirbeau", a literary society he is currently presiding. He is also the founder and editor in chief of Cahiers Octave Mirbeau (1993).

A biographer and indefatigable authority of Mirbeau's work, Michel has published critical editions of all his work: novels, plays, articles and correspondence.

Pierre Michel was awarded the Sévigné prize in October 2003 for his edition of the first volume of Mirbeau's Correspondance générale.

== Publications ==
- (in French) Octave Mirbeau, l'imprécateur au cœur fidèle, biographie, Paris : Séguier, (1990). ISBN 978-2-87736-162-0
- Alice Regnault, épouse Mirbeau : "le sourire affolant de l'éternelle jeunesse", Reims : À l'écart (1994).
- Les Combats d’Octave Mirbeau (1995).
- (in French) Lucidité, désespoir et écriture (2001).
- (in French) Jean-Paul Sartre et Octave Mirbeau (2005).
- (in French) Albert Camus et Octave Mirbeau (2005).
- (in French) Octave Mirbeau et le roman (2005).
- (in French) Bibliographie d’Octave Mirbeau (2008).
- (in French) Les Articles d'Octave Mirbeau (2009).
- (in French) Dictionnaire Octave Mirbeau, L'Âge d'Homme - Société Octave Mirbeau, 2011, 1195 pages.
