= Georges Loriot =

Georges Loriot was an actor known for his role as Professeur Tournesol in the live action Tintin movie Tintin et le mystère de la Toison d'Or (French)

== Filmography ==
Year	Title	Role	Notes
1959	125 rue Montmartre	Un clown	Uncredited
1961	Tintin et le mystère de la Toison d'Or	Professeur Tournesol	Sub-character
1962	The Anniversary		Short, (as Loriot)
1962	The Suitor		Sub-Character, (as Loriot)
1965	Yo Yo		Sub-Character, (as Loriot)
1966	As Long as You've Got Your Health		Example, (as Loriot)
1967	Order of the Daisy	Le petit vieux	Uncredited
1967	Salle n° 8	Unknown	(2 episodes, 1967)
1969	Le Grand Amour	Old Man	Sub-Character, (final film role)
