= The Clowns =

- Italian: I clowns
- Directed by: Federico Fellini
- Written by: Story and Screenplay: Federico Fellini; Bernardino Zapponi
- Produced by: Elio Scardamaglia
- Starring: Federico Fellini
- Cinematography: Dario Di Palma
- Edited by: Ruggero Mastroianni
- Music by: Nino Rota
- Release date: December 25, 1970
- Running time: 92 minutes
- Language: Italian

The Clowns (Italian: I clowns, also known as I pagliacci) is a 1970 mockumentary film by Federico Fellini about the human fascination with clowns and circuses.

== Plot summary ==
The film begins with a semi-autobiographical childhood recollection of Fellini’s youth where a young boy watches from his bedroom window, a circus arrive in his hometown. The boy is simultaneously fascinated and frightened by the clowns it brings. Driving this memory is the director’s long-standing obsession with the world of the circus. From this opening, the narrative transitions into a pseudo-documentary journey in which Fellini (as himself) and a film crew travel through Italy and Paris in search of the great clowns of Europe. Along the way, the film blends interviews with veteran clowns, staged circus routines, & archival footage while constantly blurring the line between fiction and reality. Ultimately, it culminates in a surreal, operatic “clown funeral” sequence which is a metaphoric lavish farewell to a dying art form.

== Cast ==
=== Main ===
- Riccardo Billi as himself – Italian Clown (credited as Billi)
- Federico Fellini as himself
- Gigi Reder as himself – Italian Clown (credited as Reder)
- Tino Scotti as himself – Italian Clown (credited as Scotti)
- Valentini as himself – Italian Clown
- Fanfulla as himself – Italian Clown
- Merli as himself – Italian Clown
- Carlo Rizzo as himself – Italian Clown (credited as Rizzo)
- Colombaioni as Themselves – Italian Clowns (credited as I 4 Colombaioni)
- Pistoni as himself – Italian Clown
- Martana as Themselves – Italian Clowns (credited as I Martana)
- Giacomo Furia as himself – Italian Clown (credited as Furia)
- Alvaro Vitali as himself (The Troupe)
- Dante Maggio as himself – Italian Clown (credited as Maggio)
- Galliano Sbarra as himself – Italian Clown (credited as Sbarra)
- Peppino Janigro as himself – Italian Clown (credited as Janigro)
- Carini as himself – Italian Clown
- Maunsell as himself – Italian Clown
- Nino Terzo as himself – Italian Clown (credited as Terzo)
- Osiride Pevarello as Clown (Credited as Peverello)
- Nino Vingelli as himself – Italian Clown (credited as Vingelli)
- Alberto Sorrentino as himself – Italian Clown (credited as Sorrentino)
- Fumagalli as himself – Italian Clown
- Valdemaro as himself – Italian Clown
- Luigi Zerbinati as himself – Italian Clown (credited as Zerbinati)
- Ettore Bevilacqua as himself – Italian Clown (credited as Bevilacqua)
- Maya Morin as Maya (La troupe)
- Anna Lina Alberti as herself – Alvaro's mother (La troupe) (credited as Lina Alberti)
- Gasparin as Gasparino (La troupe)
- Alex as himself – French Clown
- Georges Loriot as himself – French Clown (credited as Père Loriot)
- Maïs as himself – French Clown
- Bario as himself – French Clown
- Ludo as himself – French Clown
- Nino as himself – French Clown
- Charlie Rivel as himself
- Pierre Étaix as himself
- Annie Fratellini as herself
- Victor Fratellini as himself
- Jean-Baptiste Thiérrée as himself (credited as Baptiste)
- Tristan Remy as himself
- Liana Orfei as herself
- Rinaldo Orfei as himself
- Nando Orfei as himself
- Franco Migliorini as himself – Animal Tamer
- Anita Ekberg as herself

=== Cameo/Uncredited ===
- Maria Grazia Buccella as herself
- Aristide Caporale as Railwayman
- Victoria Chaplin as herself
- Liliana Chiari as herself
- Dante Cleri as Fascist
- Shirley Corrigan as Audience member
- Feverello as himself – Italian Clown
- Gustavo Fratellini as himself – Italian Clown
- Adelina Poerio as Dwarf nun
- Richard Simmons – Clown
- Tonino Tommasi – Audience Member

== Production ==
The film was made for the Italian TV station RAI with an agreement that it would be released simultaneously as a cinema feature. RAI and co-producer Leone Film compromised on its release, with RAI broadcasting it on Christmas Day, 1970, and Leone Film releasing it theatrically in Italy the following day, December 26, 1970.

It is a docufiction: part reality, part fantasy. The film has sometimes been referred to as one of the first mockumentaries in film history (Woody Allen's Take the Money and Run having been released in just the previous year). Being documentary and fiction in one, The Clowns distinguishes itself by being a mockumentary with unique characteristics, not the least of which is reflecting Fellini's own increasing fascination with how documentary films reflect "reality". Fellini had already explored this semi-fictional documentary genre in 1969's Fellini: A Director's Notebook and would further do so in 1987's Intervista, both of which contain unreliable depictions of Fellini himself making the film within the film narrative.

== Reception ==
The film has a 100% approval rating on Rotten Tomatoes, based on 18 reviews with an average rating of 6.9/10. Film Critic Roger Ebert gave the film three stars out of four.
