= Jean Boffety =

French cinematographer (1925–1988)

Jean Bofferty (7 June 1925 – 25 June 1988) was a French New Wave cinematographer known for his collaborations with directors such as Robert Enrico, Pierre Étaix, and Claude Sautet. In 1979 Bofferty was nominated for a César Award for Best Cinematography for his work on Sautet's A Simple Story.

== Selected filmography ==
- 1962: An Occurrence at Owl Creek Bridge, by Robert Enrico
- 1964: Les Yeux cernés, by Robert Hossein
- 1965: Yo Yo, by Pierre Étaix
- 1966: Who Are You, Polly Maggoo?, by William Klein
- 1966: Un monde nouveau, by Vittorio De Sica
- 1966: Les Grandes Gueules, by Robert Enrico
- 1967: Les Aventuriers, by Robert Enrico
- 1967: Far from Vietnam
- 1968: Love in the Night
- 1968: Tante Zita, by Robert Enrico
- 1968: Je t'aime, je t'aime, by Alain Resnais
- 1969: The Great Love, by Pierre Étaix
- 1970: The Things of Life, by Claude Sautet
- 1971: Le Saut de l'ange, by Yves Boisset
- 1972: Les malheurs d'Alfred, by Pierre Richard
- 1972: Tout le monde il est beau, tout le monde il est gentil, by Jean Yanne
- 1972: César and Rosalie, by Claude Sautet
- 1974: Thieves Like Us, by Robert Altman
- 1974: Les Chinois à Paris, by Jean Yanne
- 1974: Vincent, François, Paul and the Others, by Claude Sautet
- 1975: Folle à tuer, by Yves Boisset
- 1976: Mado, by Claude Sautet
- 1977: Quintet, by Robert Altman
- 1977: The Lacemaker, by Claude Goretta
- 1978: A Simple Story, by Claude Sautet
- 1978: Butterfly on the Shoulder, by Jacques Deray
- 1979: Jigsaw (L'Homme en colère), by Claude Pinoteau
- 1980: A Bad Son, by Claude Sautet
- 1981: Les Uns et les Autres, by Claude Lelouch
- 1982: Espion, lève-toi, by Yves Boisset
- 1982: Le gendarme et les gendarmettes, by Jean Girault and Tony Aboyantz
- 1983: Édith et Marcel, by Claude Lelouch
- 1983: Waiter!, by Claude Sautet
- 1984: Dog Day, by Yves Boisset
