= Land of Milk and Honey =

- Directed by: Pierre Étaix
- Written by: Pierre Étaix
- Produced by: Paul Claudon
- Cinematography: Georges Lendi
- Edited by: Michel Lewin
- Music by: José Padilla
- Distributed by: Parafrance
- Release date: 24 February 1971
- Running time: 80 minutes
- Country: France
- Language: French

Land of Milk and Honey (French: Pays de cocagne) is a 1971 French documentary film directed by Pierre Étaix. It is about the state of the French society in the wake of the May 1968 events. The film was released in France on February 24, 1971.

== Reception ==
The film was poorly received in France upon the original release in 1971. It was quickly withdrawn from the cinema repertoire and had lasting negative consequences for Étaix, who was unable to attract investors for further film projects.

Richard Brody of The New Yorker reviewed the film in 2012 when it was shown at Film Forum in New York City, and described it as a "cleverly furious and deftly discerning documentary". Brody wrote: "The investigative element, centered on the familiar amusements of summer vacationers (shot in fulsome color) and the spontaneous ridicule and emotion of an amateur songwriting competition, diagnoses, in the discontents of leisure, the deeper maladies of society at large. The surprisingly sharp topics that arise in interviews (filmed mainly in black-and-white) include eroticism, poverty, mediatized violence, gender equality, gay marriage, the power of advertising, and the deformation of minds and manners by television. ... The concluding sequence—an inquiry into the public image of one Pierre Étaix—has a disarming reflexive loopiness, holding up mirrors to mirrors and sending the viewer off in free fall."
