= Nicole Calfan =

French actress and author

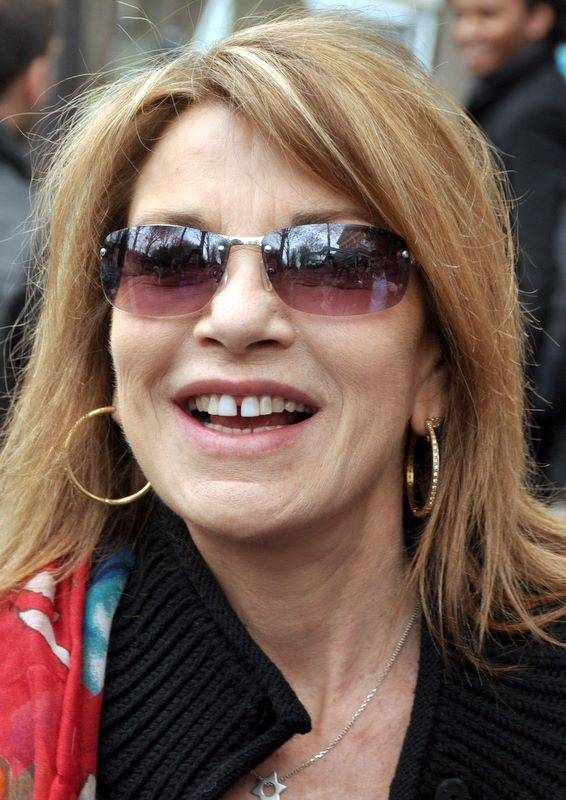
- Nicole Calfan in 2013
- Born: 4 March 1947 (age 79); Paris, France
- Occupations: Actress, Author
- Years active: 1967-present
- Spouse: François Valéry (1986-1993)
- Children: Michael (b. 1990); Jeremy (b.1986)

Nicole Calfan (born 4 March 1947) is a French actress and author. She was married to François Valéry and Michael Calfan is their son.

== Filmography ==
Year	Title	Role	Director	Notes
1967	Les poneyttes	Poupoune	Joël Le Moigné	
1968	Le théâtre de la jeunesse	Tortosa's daughter	Éric Le Hung & Jacques Trébouta	TV series (1 episode)
1969	The Great Love	Agnès	Pierre Étaix	
1970	Borsalino	Ginette	Jacques Deray	
1971	The Burglars	Hélène	Henri Verneuil	
1971	Êtes-vous fiancée à un marin grec ou à un pilote de ligne ?	Annette	Jean Aurel	
1972	Ruy Blas	Casilda	Raymond Rouleau	TV movie
1973	The Three Musketeers	Kitty	Richard Lester	
1973	Moi y'en a vouloir des sous	Nicole	Jean Yanne	
1973	Les hommes	Nuncia Marchetti	Daniel Vigne	
1973	Arsène Lupin	Catherine	Jean-Pierre Desagnat	TV series (1 episode)
1974	The Four Musketeers	Kitty	Richard Lester (2)	
1974	Chinese in Paris	Stéphanie Lefranc	Jean Yanne (2)	
1975	Permission to Kill	Melissa Lascade	Cyril Frankel	
1975	It's Raining on Santiago	Allende's daughter	Helvio Soto	
1975	Synomosia sti Mesogeio	Sue	Vasilis Georgiadis	
1976	Histoire de rire	Hélène Donaldo	Yves-André Hubert	TV movie
1976	La jalousie	Marthe Blondel	Raymond Rouleau (2)	TV movie
1976	Au théâtre ce soir	Hildegarde Maener	Pierre Sabbagh	TV series (1 episode)
1977	Le Gang	Marinette	Jacques Deray (2)	
1977	Le naufrage de Monte-Cristo	Anne-Marie	Josée Dayan	TV movie
1978	One Two Two	Georgette / Fabienne	Christian Gion	
1978	Vas-y maman	Karin	Nicole de Buron	
1979	The Dogs	Elisabeth	Alain Jessua	
1980	Sam et Sally	Sally Kramer	Joël Séria	TV series (6 episodes)
1982	Les p'tites têtes	Mata	Bernard Menez	
1982	T'es folle ou quoi ?	Florence	Michel Gérard	
1982	Le sang des tropiques		Christian Bricout	
1982	Les invités	Françoise Avignon	Roger Pigaut	TV movie
1984	Allô Béatrice	Valérie	Jacques Besnard	
1985	Flash Back	Florence Delaune	Olivier Nolin	
1985	Le seul témoin	Agnès	Jean-Pierre Desagnat (2)	TV movie
1986	Max mon amour	Hélène	Nagisa Oshima	
1986	Le dindon	Armandine	Pierre Badel	TV movie
1987	L'âge de Monsieur est avancé	Suzanne / Jacqueline	Pierre Étaix (2)	
1988	Dirty Rotten Scoundrels	Lady in Car	Frank Oz	
1993	Les grandes marées	Léna Chevalier	Jean Sagols	TV mini-series
1998	Le bahut		Arnaud Sélignac	TV series (1 episode)
1999	Les Cordier, juge et flic	Claire Rebach	Gilles Béhat	TV series (1 episode)
2001	La vérité si je mens 2	Suzie Boutboul	Thomas Gilou	
2001	L'étrange monsieur Joseph	Eva Jonavici	Josée Dayan (2)	TV movie
2002	Une employée modèle	Caroline Maurey	Jacques Otmezguine	
2002	Chère fantôme	Marion	Eric Woreth	TV movie
2002	Navarro	Martine Orloff	Patrick Jamain	TV series (1 episode)
2003	Frank Riva	Madeleine Unger	Patrick Jamain (2)	TV series (3 episodes)
2004	Nuit noire	Marie-Hélène	Daniel Colas	
2004	Navarro	Brigitte Frachon	José Pinheiro	TV series (1 episode)
2004	Commissaire Valence	Madame Carrère	Patrick Grandperret	TV series (1 episode)
2005	3 femmes... un soir d'été	Anna Auvignon	Sébastien Grall	TV mini-series
2005	Malone	Patricia	Franck Apprederis	TV series (1 episode)
2005	Femmes de loi	Sophie Corvalec	Gérard Cuq	TV series (1 episode)
2005	Le proc	Daphné Grimault	Claudio Tonetti	TV series (1 episode)
2007	La promeneuse d'oiseaux	Madame de Marseul	Jacques Otmezguine (2)	TV movie
2008	A Man and His Dog	The wife in hospital	Francis Huster	
2009	Un point c'est tout !	Emma	Laurent Baffie	TV movie
2010	Vieilles canailles	Rose	Arnaud Sélignac (2)	TV movie
2011	Chronique de l'ennui	Jean's mother	Gari Kikoïne & Jérémy Minui	Short
2011	La résidence	Marlène Sudre	Laurent Jaoui	TV movie
2012	Nos plus belles vacances	Mamie	Philippe Lellouche	
2012	La vérité si je mens 3	Suzie Boutboul	Thomas Gilou (2)	
2013	Un prince (presque) charmant	Mireille Lavantin	Philippe Lellouche (2)	
2013	La croisière	Babou	Pascal Lahmani	TV series (2 episodes)
2015	Je compte sur vous	Rose Perez	Pascal Elbé	
2016	Je suis la mémoire du geste		Jérémy Minui (2)	Short
2017	Sous le même toit		Dominique Farrugia	
2018	Guy	Stéphanie Madhani	Alex Lutz	

== Theater ==
Year	Title	Author	Director
1968	Ruy Blas	Victor Hugo	Raymond Rouleau
1969	The Miser	Molière	Jean-Paul Roussillon
1969	Les Italiens à Paris	Évariste Gherardi	Jean Le Poulain
1970	A Dream Play	August Strindberg	Raymond Rouleau (2)
1971	Ruy Blas	Victor Hugo	Raymond Rouleau (3)
1972	Count Öderland	Max Frisch	Jean-Pierre Miquel
1973	Tartuffe	Molière	Jacques Charon
1981	No Exit	Jean-Paul Sartre	Georges Wilson
1981	Joyeuses Pâques	Jean Poiret	Pierre Mondy
1984	Le Dindon	Georges Feydeau	Jean Meyer
1988	Les Cahiers tango	Françoise Dorin	Andreas Voutsinas
1989	Intimate Exchanges	Alan Ayckbourn	Bernard Murat
1992	No Hard Feelings	Sam Bobrick & Ron Clark	Pierre Mondy (2)
1996	Present Laughter	Noël Coward	Pierre Mondy (3)
2006	Atrocement vôtre	Daniel Colas	Daniel Colas
2007	The Vagina Monologues	Eve Ensler	Isabelle Rattier
2007	Money	Steve Suissa	Steve Suissa
2008	Un point c'est tout !	Laurent Baffie	Laurent Baffie
2009	Bon Anniversaire	Thierry Harcourt	Thierry Harcourt
2013	Mur	Amanda Sthers	Anne Bourgeois
2015	Acapulco madame	Yves Jacques	Jean-Luc Moreau
2016	Jacques Daniel	Laurent Baffie	Laurent Baffie (2)

== Author ==
Year	Book	Publishing
1983	La Folle Enfant	Éditions 1
1986	La Guerrière	Éditions 1
1988	Laisse faire l’été	Éditions 1
1993	La Femme en clef de sol	Éditions Denoël
1998	Je n'irai pas jouer	Éditions Ramsay
2000	L’Étouffe-cœur	Éditions Flammarion
2003	Les Dents du bonheur	Éditions Flammarion
2004	Toi l'ours, moi la poupée	Éditions Michel Lafon
2006	À part ça tout va bien : petite chronique d'une cinquantaine annoncée	Éditions Michel Lafon
2011	La Liseuse d'icônes	Éditions de l'Archipel
2012	Lettre entrouverte à Alain Delon	Éditions de l'Archipel
