= Yo Yo =

1965 French film by Pierre Étaix

Yoyo
- Theatrical release poster
- Directed by: Pierre Étaix
- Written by: Jean-Claude Carrière; Pierre Étaix
- Produced by: Paul Claudon
- Starring: Pierre Étaix; Claudine Auger; Luce Klein; Philippe Dionnet
- Cinematography: Jean Boffety
- Edited by: Henri Lanoë
- Music by: Jean Paillaud
- Production companies: CAPAC; Madeleine Films
- Distributed by: Carlotta Films
- Release date: 19 February 1965
- Running time: 95 minutes
- Country: France
- Language: French

Yoyo, also referred to as Yo Yo, is a 1965 French comedy film directed by and starring Pierre Étaix. The story follows the son of a millionaire from the 1920s to the 1960s. After losing his fortune in the stock-exchange crash, he teams up with an equestrienne and becomes a circus clown. The film was entered into the 1965 Cannes Film Festival.

== Plot ==
The father of Yoyo is a 1920s millionaire who, although having everything he fancies and living in a cavernous old chateau, is not happy, and still misses a beautiful circus performer whom he once loved. When the stock market crashes, rendering him both poor and free, he joins the circus with which his former love and their young son are working, and they renew their relationship. Their son Yoyo has begun in the circus as a clown, but later becomes a successful actor and uses his new wealth to buy back his father's chateau.

== Cast ==
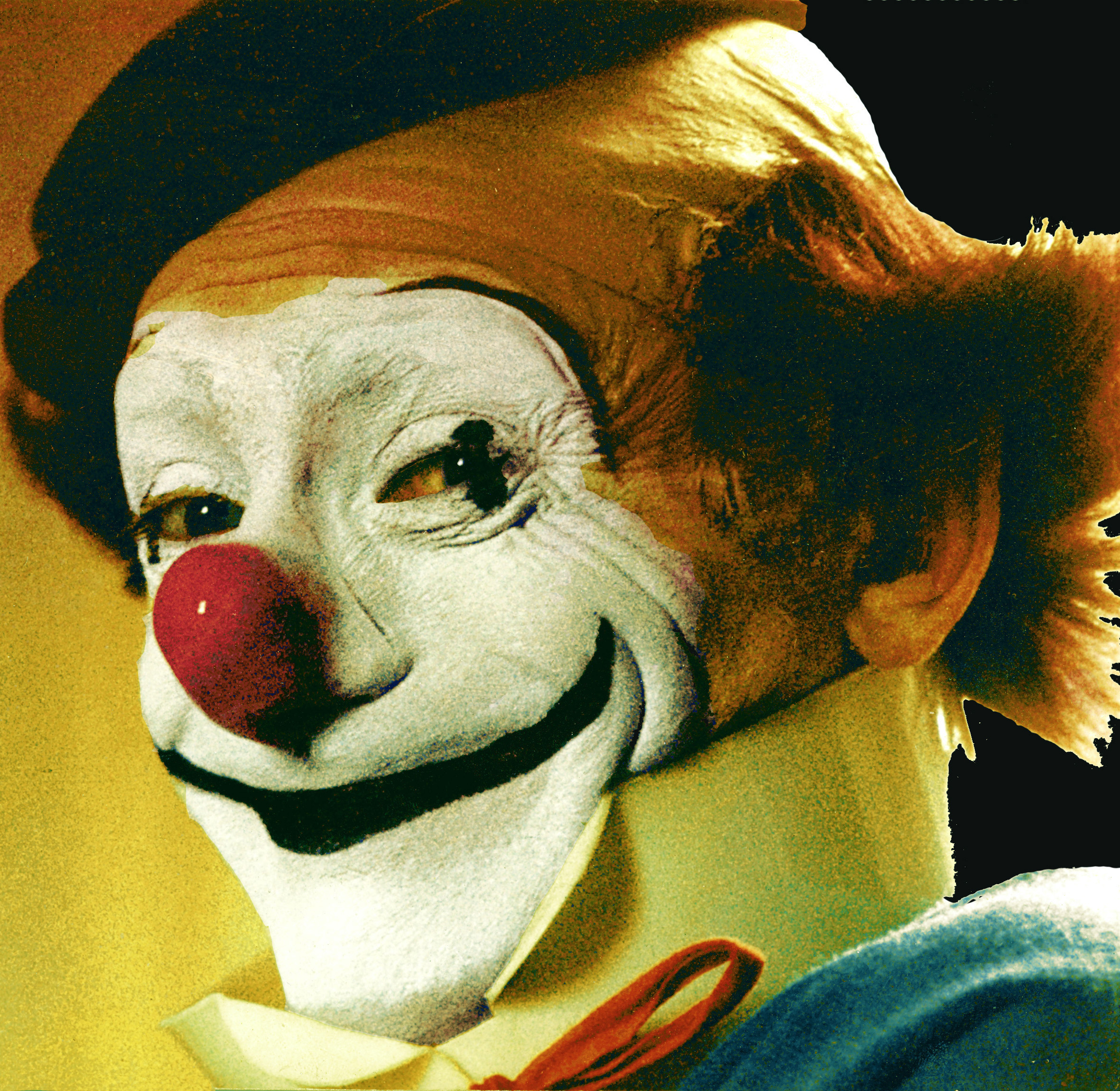
Étaix as Yo Yo in 2012

- Pierre Étaix as Yoyo / the millionaire
- Claudine Auger as Isolina
- Philippe Dionnet as Yoyo as a child
- Luce Klein as the equestrienne
- Siam as a clown
- Pipo as a clown
- Dario as a clown
- Mimile as a clown
- Martine de Breteuil as Madame de Briac
- Roger Trapp as Leroy

== Release ==
The film was released in French cinemas on 19 February 1965. It competed at the 1965 Cannes Film Festival, where it received the OCIC Award. It was released in the United States on 28 February 1967 through Magna Pictures Distribution.

== Reception ==
The film received some harsh reviews in France, which affected Étaix's next film, As Long as You've Got Your Health. Jean-Luc Godard included Yo Yo on his top-ten list of the best films of 1965. The American comedian Jerry Lewis saw the film during a visit to France and enjoyed it so much that he asked to meet its creator. A French television team that had been appointed to interview Lewis captured the meeting, where the two comedians, limited by the language barrier, made impressions of each other's comedy routines and improvised clown acts together. Lewis later cast Étaix in his own unreleased film The Day the Clown Cried.

Bosley Crowther of The New York Times reviewed the film upon the American release:

Mr. Etaix is marvelously talented. He is a master of subtle mimicry, and he plays all sorts of charming little incidents with great sensitivity and wit. ... But that's the trouble with his picture. It's too casual, fragmented and loose. It's as though Mr. Etaix were writing his script as he goes along, tossing in scenes he remembers from somebody else's film, letting himself do something (he also plays several minor roles without taking credit for them) more to display his virtuosity than to develop a story and character.

In 2007, Time Out London described the film as "possibly the best of Etaix's features", and wrote that "Etaix has just enough astringency to keep sentimentality at bay, and his mastery of the sight gag amply justifies Jerry Lewis' enthusiasm for the film, which is singularly beautifully shot by Jean Boffety."
