= From Darkness to Light =

- Film poster
- Directed by: Eric Friedler; Michael Lurie
- Written by: Eric Friedler; Michael Lurie
- Produced by: Jeffrey Giles; Thore Vollert
- Starring: Jerry Lewis; Martin Scorsese; Hans Crispin
- Cinematography: James Stolz
- Edited by: Thilo Heidermann-May; Lamar R. Tupper
- Music by: Alexander Precht
- Distributed by: The Syndicate
- Release date: September 1, 2024 (Venice Film Festival)
- Running time: 108 minutes
- Countries: United States; Germany
- Languages: English; French

From Darkness to Light is a 2024 documentary film written and directed by Eric Friedler and Michael Lurie. It explores the unreleased 1972 Jerry Lewis film The Day the Clown Cried.

== Reception ==
Xan Brooks of The Guardian gave the film four out of five stars and wrote, "Lurie and Friedler's handling of the material sometimes feels perfunctory, but the tale they tell is purely fascinating." Steve Pond of TheWrap wrote, "The Day the Clown Cried has been talked about for so long that very little in From Darkness to Light comes as a shock, though it does a good job of breaking down a tortured and fascinating journey with numerous twists and turns."
