= As Long as You've Got Your Health =

- Theatrical release poster
- Directed by: Pierre Étaix
- Written by: Pierre Étaix; Jean-Claude Carrière
- Produced by: Paul Claudon
- Starring: Pierre Étaix; Denise Péronne; Simone Fonder
- Cinematography: Jean Boffety
- Edited by: Henri Lanoë; Raymond Lewin; Roger Salesse; Andrée Werlin; Marie-Josèphe Yoyotte
- Music by: René Giner; Luce Klein; Jean Paillaud
- Production companies: C.A.P.A.C. Les Films de la Colombe
- Release date: 25 February 1966
- Running time: 65 minutes
- Country: France
- Language: French

As Long as You've Got Your Health (French: Tant qu'on a la santé) is a 1966 French comedy film directed by and starring Pierre Étaix.

== Film ==
The anthology film consists of four separate stories: a man reads about vampires all night, people leave their workplaces and try to find a seat in a cinema, people suffer from stress and consult a psychiatrist who is the most stressed of them all, and a group of people visit a small forest for different reasons.

== Cast ==
- Pierre Étaix as Pierre
- Denise Péronne
- Sabine Sun
- Claude Massot
- Véra Valmont
- Émile Coryn
- Roger Trapp
- Alain Janey

== Release ==
The film was released in France on 25 February 1966. It competed at the 1966 San Sebastián International Film Festival where it won the Silver Seashell. In 2013 it was released on home media by The Criterion Collection together with four other Étaix films.
