= Sgt. Frog season 2 =

Season of television series

Sgt. Frog
- Season 2
- Cover of the first DVD volume released by Bandai Visual
- No. of episodes: 52

Release
- Original network: TV Tokyo
- Original release: April 1, 2005 – March 31, 2006

Season chronology
- ← Previous; Season 1 Next → Season 3

The second season of Sgt. Frog (Japanese: ケロロ軍曹, Keroro Gunsō) is part of the anime television series adapted from the manga by Mine Yoshizaki. This season includes 52 episodes, continuing from episode 52 to 103, and aired in Japan on TV Tokyo between April 1, 2005, and March 31, 2006.

== Episode list ==
No.	Title	Original release date
52	"Keroro Standing on Earth Once Again! (Green Dwarf: Back to Earth!)"; Transliteration: "Keroro Futatabi Daichi ni Tatsu! de Arimasu" (Japanese: ケロロ 再び大地に立つ！ であります)	April 1, 2005
52	"Tamama, Black Tamama (Damsel in a Mess!)"; Transliteration: "Tamama Kuroi Tamama de Arimasu" (Japanese: タママ 黒いタママ であります)	April 1, 2005
Keroro sneaks into Fuyuki's room and steals his Kero ball back. He uses it to invade the Hinata residence, trapping Fuyuki and Natsumi. However, Keroro runs into problems when Aki returns home. Tamama and Momoko devise a plan to get Fuyuki and Momoka closer together. Unfortunately, things don't go as planned when Keroro unexpectedly arrives.
53	"Keroro, Plan to Invade the Treasures (Intergalactic Planetary Deep Fried Twinkies!)"; Transliteration: "Keroro Otakara Shinryaku Daisakusen! de Arimasu" (Japanese: ケロロ お宝侵略大作戦！ であります)	April 8, 2005
53	"Angol Mois, More More Flower-Seeing (Cherry Blossoms of Terror!)"; Transliteration: "Angoru Moa Hanami de Moamoa~ de Arimasu" (Japanese: アンゴル・モア 花見でモアモア～ であります)	April 8, 2005
Keroro, Fuyuki and Natusmi watch a television special on famous landmarks and whether or not aliens created them. Along with Tamama and Kululu, Keroro and Fuyuki visit the landmarks from the special and discover the truth behind each landmark. When Mois arrives back on Earth, her actions cause every cherry blossom tree in Japan to lose their petals. This ruins Keroro's latest plan, and Mois works to get the cherry blossom petals back on the trees.
54	"Fuyuki, I am a Famous Investigator? (Dial 'M' For Maybe I Can Solve This Murder!)"; Transliteration: "Fuyuki Meitantei wa Boku? de Arimasu" (Japanese: 冬樹 名探偵は僕？ であります)	April 15, 2005
54	"Dororo, the Revived Warrior (Tales from the Gypped: Demon Night)"; Transliteration: "Dororo Fukkatsu no Senshi de Arimasu" (Japanese: ドロロ 復活の戦士 であります)	April 15, 2005
Keroro, Tamama, Kululu, and the Hinata siblings investigate the story behind an unconscious Kogoro. Keroro, Tamama, and the Hinata family return to the mountains to visit their grandmother. Meanwhile, Dororo has been mistaken for a "demon" currently living in the area and uses the guise to reunite himself with Keroro and Tamama.
55	"Giroro, the Resurrected Soldier (Armagarden!)"; Transliteration: "Giroro Yomigaetta Sorujā de Arimasu" (Japanese: ギロロ 蘇ったソルジャー であります)	April 22, 2005
55	"Fuyuki, Swimming Carp Flags! (Carp Diem: Seize the Planet!)"; Transliteration: "Fuyuki Oyoge Koinobori! de Arimasu" (Japanese: 冬樹 およげこいのぼり！ であります)	April 22, 2005
Giroro plants space seeds all over the city. Fuyuki thinks he is too old to take part in the Children's Day celebrations, so Keroro turns him into a little boy.
56	"Natsumi and Koyuki, Princesses of Tennis (Match Point: To The Death)"; Transliteration: "Natsumi & Koyuki Tenisu no Purinsesu de Arimasu" (Japanese: 夏美＆小雪 テニスのプリンセス であります)	April 29, 2005
56	"Keroro, Hope the Weather Clears Up For the Invasion (Hard to (Be a) Swallow!)"; Transliteration: "Keroro Shinryaku Hiyori no Satsuki Hare de Arimasu" (Japanese: ケロロ 侵略日和のさつき晴れ であります)	April 29, 2005
Koyuki asks Natsumi for a challenge to deepen their friendship. Keroro suggests a tennis match, and the loser has to make their hair into an afro. Bird nests start to appear on everyone's heads.
57	"Dororo, An Innate Rebel (Viper Rash!)"; Transliteration: "Dororo Gyakushū suru wa Waga ni Ari de Arimasu" (Japanese: ドロロ 逆襲するは我にあり であります)	May 6, 2005
57	"Huge Frog Against the Freak of the Southern Seas (Old School Monster Battle: Keroro Style!)"; Transliteration: "Kyodai Kaeru tai Nankai no Daikaijū de Arimasu" (Japanese: 巨大カエル対南海の大怪獣 であります)	May 6, 2005
Viper's older brother Viper Sr. wants revenge on Dororo, so he kidnaps the rest of the platoon and forces Dororo to come save them. After turning himself giant by using the Flash Spoon to stopped Viper Sr. in the last episode, Keroro tries using his newfound size to invade Pekopon. However, Keroro's plans was backfired after the squid and the crab he caught, including the mata mata, use the Flash Spoon to transform into the giant monsters called Ikara, Kanime and Gameba, respectively.
58	"Keroro Invade the Vending Machine (My Snoballs Give Me Redbulls!)"; Transliteration: "Keroro Jihanki de Shinryaku seyo de Arimasu" (Japanese: ケロロ 自販機で侵略せよ であります)	May 13, 2005
58	"Tamama Awakens! Secret Technique (Tamama Said Knock You Out!)"; Transliteration: "Tamama Kakusei! Shin Hissatsu Waza de Arimasu" (Japanese: タママ 覚醒！新必殺技 であります)	May 13, 2005
Each member of the Keroro platoon creates a beverage for a vending machine of Kululu's creation. After becoming frustrated with losing sparring matches to Paul on a regular basis, Tamama goes to Keroro for help, who promises to train him and help him become stronger.
59	"Keroro, The Cultivated Castle! (The House That Trash Built!)"; Transliteration: "Keroro Sodate yo Shiro! de Arimasu" (Japanese: ケロロ 育てよ城！ であります)	May 20, 2005
59	"Keroro's Moving Castle! (How the West Was Run!)"; Transliteration: "Keroro no, Ugoku Shiro! de Arimasu" (Japanese: ケロロ の、動く城！ であります)	May 20, 2005
Keroro wants to build a castle for use as a base of operations. He gets his friends to help him build it out of trash. Once it is finished, however, it keeps getting bigger. The castle, which is possessed by an ancient spirit, decides to get up and head for Kyoto. Fearing the destruction of a Gundam model factory, Keroro reluctantly rallies his troops to go and stop it.
60	"Keroro, Ribbiting Machine Race (Honey, I Shrunk the Frogs)"; Transliteration: "Keroro Kerokero Mashin Mō Rēsu de Arimasu" (Japanese: ケロロ ケロケロマシン猛レース であります)	May 27, 2005
60	"Mois Hope That the Sleeping Princess Rests? (Sleeping Beauty Never Killed a Planet?)"; Transliteration: "Moa Nemuri Hime tte Yū ka Anmin Kibō? de Arimasu" (Japanese: モア 眠り姫ってゆーか安眠希望？ であります)	May 27, 2005
Keroro and friends compete in a miniature car race. Mois starts acting strangely when she feels drowsy.
61	"Fuyuki What Happened To the Mysterious Transfer Student? (Very Superstitious, Writings On the Rock-Stone Thing?)"; Transliteration: "Fuyuki Nazo no Tenkō Shōjo ni Nani ga Okotta ka? de Arimasu" (Japanese: 冬樹 謎の転校少女にナニが起こったか？ であります)	June 3, 2005
61	"Natsumi and Saburo, The Two Who Cannot Return (Lost in Space?)"; Transliteration: "Natsumi & Saburō Modorenai Fu-ta-ri de Arimasu" (Japanese: 夏美＆サブロー 戻れないフ・タ・リ であります)	June 3, 2005
Keroro starts experiencing good luck after coming into possession of a mystical orb. Natsumi and Saburo accidentally get trapped in a rocket together.
62	"Momoka, Natsumi, and Mois Phantom Thief More Peach Summer (Take Another Little Piece of My Art Now Baby!)"; Transliteration: "Momoka & Natsumi & Moa Kaitō Moa Pīchi Samā de Arimas" (Japanese: 桃華＆夏美＆モア怪盗モアピーチサマー であります)	June 10, 2005
62	"Keroro Victory! Battle In the Waters (Waterworld: Keroro Kicks Kevin's Keister)"; Transliteration: "Keroro Hisshō! Suichū Daikessen de Arimasu" (Japanese: ケロロ 必勝！水中大決戦 であります)	June 10, 2005
A group of thieves known as "MorePeachSummer" plans on stealing a priceless Nishizawa family treasure. Fuyuki and the platoon are tasked with guarding it. Keroro fills the inside of the house with water.
63	"Keroro Story Of Teacher Keroro! (Lean On Me! Wait, Don't! You're Too Heavy!)"; Transliteration: "Keroro Kyōshi Gerogero Monogatari! de Arimasu" (Japanese: ケロロ 教師ゲロゲロ物語！ であります)	June 17, 2005
63	"Keroro Reunion With Father (It Had to Be Ew.)"; Transliteration: "Keroro Saikai, Chichi yo de Arimasu" (Japanese: ケロロ 再会、父よ であります)	June 17, 2005
In an attempt to hastily write a report on Pekoponian children, Keroro disguises himself as a teacher and spends the day with Fuyuki's and Momoka's class. Keroro's dad arrives on Earth for an unexpected visit with news of an arranged marriage for Keroro. In an attempt to get out of the marriage, Natsumi takes on the role as Keroro's fiancé.
64	"Keroro If You Want to Suck, Suck! Give Up On Lying (Pathological Dryer!)"; Transliteration: "Keroro Suu nara Sue! Uso Yyappa Yamete de Arimasu" (Japanese: ケロロ 吸うなら吸え！ウソやっぱやめて であります)	June 24, 2005
64	"Dororo Escape From Trauma (I Won't Cry With a Little Help From My Friends)"; Transliteration: "Dororo Torauma kara no Dasshutsu de Arimasu" (Japanese: ドロロ トラウマからの脱出 であります)	June 24, 2005
The group has to stop an invasion of Nyororo. Dororo is still stuck in trauma mode from the last episode, so Keroro, Tamama, and Giroro go inside of his mind to fix his bad memories.
65	"Keroro Bark At Pekopon (Shield Law and Order with The Wire from Crime Scene Investigator's Cold Case Files: Special Visitor's Unit. Life on the Streets.)"; Transliteration: "Keroro Pekopon ni Hoero! de Arimasu" (Japanese: ケロロ ペコポンにほえろ！ であります)	July 1, 2005
65	"Tamama A Visitor From Planet Keron (ET: The Extra-Special Terrestrial)"; Transliteration: "Tamama Keronsei kara no Hōmonsha de Arimasu" (Japanese: タママ ケロン星からの訪問者 であります)	July 1, 2005
The Keroro platoon sets out to find a dangerous alien responsible for destroying hundreds of planets so Keroro can gain prizes and recognition. Karara, a Keronian youth, ends up crash landing on Pekopon and spends the day with Tamama. Things don't go as planned when Karara ends up destroying Keroro's, Giroro's, Kululu's, and Dororo's possessions by accident.
66	"Giroro, Love Rescue Mission (Love in the Time of Color T.V.)"; Transliteration: "Giroro Ai no Kyūshutsu Daisakusen de Arimasu" (Japanese: ギロロ 愛の救出大作戦 であります)	July 8, 2005
66	"Natsumi and Koyuki Heart-Beating First Date (The Spied Girls)"; Transliteration: "Natsumi ando Koyuki Dokkidokki Hatsu Dēto de Arimasu" (Japanese: 夏美＆小雪 ドッキドッキ初デート であります)	July 8, 2005
Keroro signs a deal to exchange two Pekoponians for a ticket to a sports game on Keron with the Events Alien. The Events Alien ends up taking Natsumi and Fuyuki and Keroro, Tamama and Giroro set out to rescue them. Koyuki and Natsumi spend the day together, much to Giroro's annoyance. Giroro, Keroro and Tamama follow the two girls as they have fun around town.
67	"Fuyuki and Momoka Secret of the Mystery Date Friday Night Frights!"; Transliteration: "Fuyuki ando Momoka Himitsu no Misuterī Dēto de Arimasu" (Japanese: 冬樹＆桃華 ひみつのミステリーデート であります)	July 15, 2005
67	"Keroro Let's Create a Game (Super Keroro Sixty-Four... For the Whee!)"; Transliteration: "Keroro Naa, Gēmu o Tsukurou ja nai ka de Arimasu" (Japanese: ケロロ なあ、ゲームを作ろうじゃないか であります)	July 15, 2005
After hearing reports about an abandoned school building outside of town, Fuyuki and Momoka go to explore the building. The Keroro platoon is inspired to create a video game after noticing how addicting games can be for humans.
68	"Keroro Huge Transformation! Massive Reform (House of 1000 Floors-es!)"; Transliteration: "Keroro Daikaizō! Rifōmu wa Gekiteki ni de Arimasu" (Japanese: ケロロ 大改造！リフォームは劇的に であります)	July 22, 2005
68	"Dororo, Destiny Showdown (You Ain't Nothing But a Found Dog)"; Transliteration: "Dororo Iza Mairu! Shukumei no Taiketsu de Arimasu" (Japanese: ドロロ いざまいる！宿命の対決 であります)	July 22, 2005
Keroro completely changes the inside of the Hinata household to suit his own tastes. Dororo's old canine friend, Zeroyasha, returns, and Keroro is intent on adding the dog to his platoon.
69	"Natsumi and Fuyuki Spirited Away (Ribbited Away)"; Transliteration: "Natsumi to Fuyuki no Kamigakushi de Arimasu" (Japanese: 夏美と冬樹 の神隠し であります)	July 29, 2005
69	"Keroro Midsummer Comedic Battle (Return to the Wet Hot Beaches)"; Transliteration: "Keroro Kōrei! Manatsu no Owarai Batoru de Arimasu" (Japanese: ケロロ 恒例！真夏のお笑いバトル であります)	July 29, 2005
The hot springs are invaded by aliens from all over the galaxy. Keroro enters the comedy contest at the beach again when he learns that it is going to be broadcast on TV.
70	"Keron vs. Pekopon Full Showdown!? (War and PC!)"; Transliteration: "Keronjin tai Pekoponjin Tsuini Zenmen Taiketsu ka!? de Arimasu" (Japanese: ケロン人VSペコポン人 ついに全面対決か!? であります)	August 5, 2005
70	"Koyuki Heart-Thumping First Riceball (Mighty Mousians)"; Transliteration: "Koyuki Dokkidokki Hatsu Omusubi de Arimasu" (Japanese: 小雪 ドッキドッキ初おむすび であります)	August 5, 2005
Keroro gets the Hinata family involved in a simulated invasion. Koyuki makes a special "rice ball" for her picnic with Natsumi, which is actually an ancient ninja weapon. However, the two get in trouble when the ball accidentally destroys the home of an underground species known as Mousians.
71	"Wicked! Bewitched! Legend of the King who Forgets to Do His Homework (The Backup Planet!)"; Transliteration: "Gokuaku! Meiwaku! Uchū Shukudai Wasure Ō Densetsu de Arimasu" (Japanese: 極悪！迷惑！ 宇宙宿題忘れ王伝説 であります)	August 12, 2005
Keroro and his friends are to be dismissed from their duties on Pekopon unless they make progress with their invasion plans. To prevent this from happening, they embark on a plan that involves creating a miniature copy of Pekopon.
72	"Keroro Ironman Chef Challenge (I Pity Da Food!)"; Transliteration: "Keroro Tetsujin Shefu no Chōsenjō de Arimasu" (Japanese: ケロロ 鉄人シェフの挑戦状 であります)	August 19, 2005
72	"Tamama Strongest Soldier Challenge (Beetlemania!)"; Transliteration: "Tamama Saikyō Senshi no Chōsenjō desū de Arimasu" (Japanese: タママ 最強戦士の挑戦状ですぅ であります)	August 19, 2005
Two alien chefs put Keroro up to a cooking challenge. While Tamama is searching for the beetle he fought with before, the Hinata household is invaded by giant beetles.
73	"Fuyuki 198X: Our Summer Vacation (Flux Capacitor? I Hardly Flux Ca-Know It-Her!)"; Transliteration: "Fuyuki 198X Bokutachi no Natsuyasumi de Arimasu" (Japanese: 冬樹 198X・僕たちの夏休み であります)	August 26, 2005
After getting struck by lightning, the Platoon are sent back in time.
74	"Surprising - Special Version, Gerogero 30 Minutes, 15 Stories"; Transliteration: "Atto Odorokū Tokubetsu Kikaku Gerogero Sanjūbun de Arimasu" (Japanese: あっと驚く～特別企画 ゲロゲロ30分 であります)	September 2, 2005
This episode shows 15 random stories: Sgt. Keroro Tries Guinness! (My Goodness! My Guinness Record!) (ケロロ軍曹 ギネスに挑戦!, Keroro Gunsō Ginesu ni Chōsen); Keroro, Straw Invader (Wiley Keroro Presents: Swap Feat) (ケロロ わらしべ侵略者 であります, Keroro Warashibe Shinryakusha); Mois, Heart-thumping Private Lesson (All Night Wrong) (モア ドキドキ個人授業, Moa Dokidoki Kojin Jugyō); Paul, Still yet an Indelible Past (Them's Fightin Words) (ポール それでも消せない過去, Pōru Sore demo kesenai kako); Keroro, Challenging Guinness (Attempting to break a Guinness world record!) (ケロロ ギネスに挑戦中, Keroro Ginesu ni Chõsenchū); Keroro, Cinema Paradise (Big Shot Keroro Presents: Cinema Parody, So?) (ケロロ★ シネマパラダイス, Keroro Shinema Paradaisu)
75	"Momoka Awaken! Third Momoka (Me, Myself and I'm Mean!)"; Transliteration: "Momoka Kakusei! Sanbanme no Momoka de Arimasu" (Japanese: 桃華 覚醒！三番目の桃華 であります)	September 9, 2005
Momoka's father, Baro wants Fuyuki to train but fails. Kululu start to target Fuyuki but Momoka push him. When the Kururu's installment accidentally shoots her, the third Momoka has awaken, forcing the Keroro Platoon to invade the Pekopon immediately and wants Fuyuki to become the ruler of Pekopon, but Fuyuki refused because he wants the Pekopon to be safe and peaceful, so that the Keronian and Pekoponians live together on Pekopon. Keroro accidentally press the button, which will cause the Pekoponians to be destroyed. Before times up, Fuyuki removed the last trigger. The install of Kululu has gone and Momoka returns to normal and wakes up. Baro advice to Momoka that Fuyuki needs to train again with a helmet that increases his power to battle with him.
76	"Keroro Platoon Please Take Me to the Moon (To the Moon, Palace!)"; Transliteration: "Keroro Shōtai Watashi o Tsuki e Tsuretette de Arimasu" (Japanese: ケロロ小隊 私を月へ連れてって であります)	September 16, 2005
The Platoon (minus Dororo) goes on a trip to the Moon.
77	"Tamama Am I Really Getting Married? (The Red String Theory!)"; Transliteration: "Tamama Kekkon suru tte Hontō desu ka de Arimasu" (Japanese: タママ 結婚するって本当ですか であります)	September 23, 2005
77	"Tamama Sealing Tamama Impact (Buried-Deep Impact)"; Transliteration: "Tamama Fūin Tamama Inpakuto de Arimasu" (Japanese: タママ 封印タママインパクト であります)	September 23, 2005
Karara and Taruru return to Earth for an arranged marriage between Karara and Tamama. Because of his feelings for Keroro, Tamama does everything he can to dissuade Karara from wanting to marry him. Wanting to become a stronger fighter, Tamama decides to not use his Tamama Impact. This becomes troublesome when he pushes Keroro and Mois closer together during his training.
78	"Keroro Treasure Hunting Should Be Carried Out On a Treasure Island (Frogs of the Bermuda Triangle!)"; Transliteration: "Keroro Takara Sagashi wa Yappa Takarajima da yo ne de Arimasu" (Japanese: ケロロ 宝さがしはやっぱ宝島だよね であります)	September 30, 2005
A policewoman from space needs the Platoon's help in finding an ancient treasure before Viper does. (Note: This is to date, the final episode dubbed in English by Funimation.)
79	"Fuyuki Do Not Give Up For the Sports Meet (Anchor's a Waste)"; Transliteration: "Fuyuki Undōkai wa Akiramenai de Arimasu" (Japanese: 冬樹 運動会はあきらめない であります)	October 7, 2005
79	"Giroro I Know What a Cat Is (A Picture is Worth a Thousand Purrs!)"; Transliteration: "Giroro Neko wa Shitteru de Arimasu" (Japanese: ギロロ 猫は知ってる であります)	October 7, 2005
Fuyuki trains hard for the upcoming Sports Day. Giroro loses the picture of Natsumi that he keeps in his belt, so his cat turns herself into a human again and tries to find another one.
80	"Keroro Oh My, Running Away From Home is So Lonely"; Transliteration: "Keroro Iyā Iede tte Honto Sabishii Mon desu ne de Arimasu" (Japanese: ケロロ いや～家出ってホント寂しいもんですね であります)	October 14, 2005
Keroro feels unloved and lonely, so he decides to run away from home and live by himself. He quickly learns that living alone isn't all it's cracked up to be.
81	"Giroro Red-Faced Days Full of Willpower"; Transliteration: "Giroro Makkana Dokonjō no Hibi de Arimasu" (Japanese: ギロロ 真っ赤なド根性の日々 であります)	October 21, 2005
81	"Fight, Koyuki! Protect Your Loved Ones"; Transliteration: "Tatakae Koyuki! Taisetsu na Hito o Mamoru ta me ni de Arimasu" (Japanese: 戦え小雪！ 大切な人を守るために であります)	October 21, 2005
Giroro's mind is merged with Natsumi's hand. Unfortunately, this is also the day of an important softball game at Natsumi's school. Koyuki is being attacked by space ninjas.
82	"Mutsumi Want to Be On My Radio?"; Transliteration: "Mutsumi Boku no Rajio ni de nai? de Arimasu" (Japanese: 623 僕のラジオにでない？ であります)	October 28, 2005
82	"Keroro vs. Natsumi 1/6 Model Battle!"; Transliteration: "Keroro tai Natsumi Rokubun-no-Ichi Gachinko Batoru! de Arimasu" (Japanese: ケロロVS夏美 1/6ガチンコバトル！ であります)	October 28, 2005
Keroro and Natsumi compete to see who gets to be on 623's radio show. Keroro goes ballistic when Natsumi takes away one of his models.
83	"Keroro, Mixed Hot Springs Murder Incident. The Spirit of the Most Unfortunate Sibling in Space. Because of Brother's Colored Box Hot Spring, Only One Foot Can Be Placed Inside. When the Brother Slipped From the Shock and Fell Unconscious, The Sister's Tears Fell like Flower Petals"; Transliteration: "Keroro Onsen Kon'yoku Rotenburo Satsujin Jiken. Yukemuri ni Sasurau Uchū Ichi Fukō na Kyōdai no Tamashii. Ani ga Tsukutta Karābokkusu Onsen. Iza Nyūrou to Sureba Kataashi hika Hain Nakute, Shokku de Ashi o Suberaseta Ani ga Kizetsu suru Toki, Yunohana ni Imōto no Namida ga Mai Ochiru. de Arimasu" (Japanese: ケロロ 温泉混浴露天風呂殺人事件 湯煙にさすらう宇宙一不幸な兄妹の魂 兄が作ったカラーボックス温泉 いざ入ろうとすれば片足しか入んなくて、ショックで足を滑らせた兄が気絶するとき、湯の花に妹の涙が舞い落ちる であります)	November 4, 2005
83	"Kululu, the Most Dislikeable Guy"; Transliteration: "Kururu Tokoton Iya na Yatsu de Arimasu" (Japanese: クルル とことん嫌なヤツ であります)	November 4, 2005
Keroro tries to solve a mystery at the hot springs. Kululu is accidentally turned into a baby.
84	"Momoka: Want to Eat Lunch in Space?"; Transliteration: "Momoka: Chotto Uchū de Ranchi demo de Arimasu" (Japanese: 桃華 ちょっと宇宙でランチでも であります)	November 11, 2005
84	"Keroro: Protect the Mushrooms!"; Transliteration: "Keroro: Matsutake o Kare! de Arimasu" (Japanese: ケロロ 松茸を狩れ！ であります)	November 11, 2005
Momoka makes lunch for Fuyuki, and invites him to go with her into space on a shuttle so he can eat it with her while watching a comet as a ploy to seduce him. Keroro discovers that matsutake mushrooms fetch a high price when sold and decides to go with the platoon on a mission collect them. Unfortunately, they drastically misunderstand the nature of Pekopon's mushrooms.
85	"Keroro Turn Once and Switch Bodies"; Transliteration: "Keroro Gashatto Mawaseba Irekawari de Arimasu" (Japanese: ケロロ ガシャッとまわせばいれかわり であります)	November 18, 2005
85	"Natsumi Turns Into a Magical Girl..."; Transliteration: "Natsumi Mahō Shōjo ni Naretara...de Arimasu" (Japanese: 夏美 魔法少女になれたら… であります)	November 18, 2005
Keroro and Natsumi switch bodies. Keroro uses a magic wand to turn everyone into magical girls.
86	"Natsumi and Fuyuki Stay with the Devilish Hinata Family"; Transliteration: "Fuyuki & Natsumi Akuma no Sumu Hinataka de Arimasu" (Japanese: 冬樹＆夏美 悪魔のすむ日向家 であります)	November 25, 2005
86	"Keroro Turns Into A Super Hero!"; Transliteration: "Keroro Nare! Sūpā Hīrō ni de Arimasu" (Japanese: ケロロ なれ！スーパーヒーローに であります)	November 25, 2005
Paranormal activity starts occurring throughout the house. Giroro believes that this is the work of an alien race known as Spectronians, and the team tries to find ways to drive them out. Keroro makes everyone participate in a simulation based on a typical Super Sentai show.
87	"Keroro, Best Wishes! Happy Birthday"; Transliteration: "Keroro Iwae! Happībāsudei de Arimasu" (Japanese: ケロロ 祝え！ハッピーバースデイ であります)	December 9, 2005
87	"Mois, Mois in Wonderland"; Transliteration: "Moa Fushigi no Kuni no Moa de Arimasu" (Japanese: モア 不思議の国のモア であります)	December 9, 2005
Keroro's excitement for his birthday soon melts into despair as he starts believing that his friends forgot about it. A group of omnipotent aliens send Mois to a dream world based on Alice in Wonderland to determine to fate of the Pekopon.
88	"Dasonu Maso Pekopon Received!"; Transliteration: "Dasonu Maso Pekopon wa Moratta! Butcha Ke Hoshiku mo Nai Kedo ne de Arimasu" (Japanese: ダソヌ☆マソ ペコポンはもらった！ ブッチャ毛ほしくもないけどね であります)	December 16, 2005
Dasonu Maso returns to Pekopon, this time using an army of robotic doppelgangers to turn the population into afro-having funk-lovers. It's up to the Keroro Platoon and friends to stop him, with some coaching from the true Dance Man.
89	"Giroro The Man with Seven Faces"; Transliteration: "Giroro Nanatsu no Kao no Otoko da ze de Arimasu" (Japanese: ギロロ 七つの顔の男だぜ であります)	December 23, 2005
89	"Fuyuki Serve It On! Frog Meet"; Transliteration: "Fuyuki Moriagare! Okaruto Taikai de Arimasu" (Japanese: 冬樹 盛り上がれ！オカルト大会 であります)	December 23, 2005
A mishap with Kululu's latest inventions splits Giroro into seven parts of his personality. Mayhem ensues when Giroro's ruthless violent side, Giroppe, plans a hostile takeover. Fuyuki competes in a tournament of occult-based challenges to save his occult club.
90	"Keroro I Cannot Say Merry Christmas"; Transliteration: "Keroro Merī Kurisumasu ga Ienakute de Arimasu" (Japanese: ケロロ メリークリスマスが言えなくて であります)	December 30, 2005
The Keroro Platoon's attempt to help with Christmas decorating ends in disaster, angering the Hinatas. To make matters worse, Keroro learns he has one night to show progress of his invasion, or his platoon will get sent home.
91	"Keroro, the New Year, Birth of New Keroro"; Transliteration: "Keroro Shinnen: Shinsei Keroro Tanjō de Arimasu" (Japanese: ケロロ 新年・新生ケロロ誕生 であります)	January 6, 2006
91	"Koyuki, Granny Is Coming"; Transliteration: "Koyuki Obaachan ga Yattekita de Arimasu" (Japanese: 小雪 おばあちゃんがやって来た であります)	January 6, 2006
Tired of Keroro's lazy ways, Giroro has Kururu invent a ray to turn the sergeant from slacker to stickler. Meanwhile, Dororo has also been turned into a lazy bum. Koyuki spends New Year's with the Hinatas, and quickly forms a deep bond with their grandmother.
92	"Keroro Platoon Love Transcends the Sky"; Transliteration: "Keroro Shōtai Ōzora yori Ai o Komete de Arimasu" (Japanese: ケロロ小隊 大空より愛をこめて であります)	January 13, 2006
92	"Momoka vs. Mois Battle Clash"; Transliteration: "Momoka tai Moa Gekitotsu wa Netsuki Batoru de Arimasu" (Japanese: 桃華対モア 激突はねつきバトル であります)	January 13, 2006
The Keroro Platoon turn into kites to take their invasion to the skies. Momoka's New Year's fortune inspires her to hold a hanetsuki tournament to impress Fuyuki.
93	"Natsumi Delves Into the Secret Basement!"; Transliteration: "Natsumi Shinnyū! Himitsu Kichi de Arimasu" (Japanese: 夏美 侵入！秘密基地 であります)	January 20, 2006
93	"Aki Hinata, Probably the Strongest Woman In Space"; Transliteration: "Hinata Aki Tabun Uchū Saikyō no Onna de Arimasu" (Japanese: 日向秋 たぶん宇宙最強の女 であります)	January 20, 2006
Natsumi ventures through the perils of the Keroro Platoon's base to rescue her prized autograph, with help from Koyuki. Aki sets out to submit her manuscript before the deadline while being pursued by a fierce alien head-hunter.
94	"Karara & Taruru Receive Pekopon!"; Transliteration: "Karara & Taruru Pekopon o Moratchaou! de Arimasu" (Japanese: カララ＆タルル ペコポンをもらっちゃおう！ であります)	January 27, 2006
Karara and Taruru return to Pekopon so Karara can try to woo Kululu, but things go awry when the two kids stumble upon the platoon's weapons storage and decide to take the invasion into their own hands.
95	"Natsumi Giroro Separates? Rescue Mission Till Death"; Transliteration: "Natsumi Giroro Chiru? Kesshi no Kyūshutsu Sakusen de Arimasu" (Japanese: 夏美 ギロロ散る？ 決死の救出作戦 であります)	February 3, 2006
Giroro gets kidnapped by a grudge-holding alien seeking revenge, and it's up to Natsumi to save him before he dries out.
96	"More Peach Summer Snow the Decisive Valentine Struggle"; Transliteration: "Moa Pīchi Samā Sunō Kessen Barentain de Arimasu" (Japanese: モアピーチサマースノー 決戦バレンタイン であります)	February 10, 2006
96	"Keroro, An Extremely Sorrowful Tale"; Transliteration: "Keroro Yonimo Fukō na Monogatari de Arimasu" (Japanese: ケロロ 世にも不幸な物語 であります)	February 10, 2006
Natsumi accidentally gives chocolate meant for Saburo to 556, and calls upon the rest of MorePeachSummerSnow to help get it back. Keroro comes across a stone that attracts bad luck, and must keep it (and himself) safe until its owner arrives to collect it.
97	"Momoka, An Ultimate Enemy Is a Difficult One to Read"; Transliteration: "Momoka Kyōteki to Kaite "Tomo" to Yomu de Arimasu" (Japanese: 桃華 強敵と書いて"とも"と読む であります)	February 17, 2006
97	"Keroro & Fuyuki, Just Us Two..."; Transliteration: "Keroro & Fuyuki Futari de... de Arimasu" (Japanese: ケロロ＆冬樹 ふたりで… であります)	February 17, 2006
Momoka tries to get the perfect picture of Fuyuki. Keroro and Fuyuki spend an afternoon at Grandma's house.
98	"Momoka the Grand Running Away From Home Strategy"; Transliteration: "Momoka Kakeochi Daisakusen de Arimasu" (Japanese: 桃華 駆け落ち大作戦 であります)	February 24, 2006
98	"Dororo and Koyuki An Encounter to Remember"; Transliteration: "Dororo Ando Koyuki Deai no Kioku de Arimasu" (Japanese: ドロロ＆小雪 出会いの記憶 であります)	February 24, 2006
Momoka pretends to elope with Masayoshi in an attempt to make Fuyuki jealous. Koyuki reminisces on her time in her ninja village, and her first meeting with Dororo.
99	"Nastumi Nacchi the Good Dog"; Transliteration: "Natsumi Meiken Natchī de Arimasu" (Japanese: 夏美 名犬ナッチー であります)	March 3, 2006
99	"Keroro A Keropper's Naughtiness"; Transliteration: "Keroro Wanpaku Keroppā de Arimasu" (Japanese: ケロロ わんぱくケロッパー であります)	March 3, 2006
Keroro takes vengeance on Natsumi by turning her into a dog. Desperate for funds, the Keroro Platoon open an aquarium.
100	"Keroro Platoon Eh? Who Am...I? Who Is...Everyone?"; Transliteration: "Keroro E? Waga Tomogara...Dare? Minna...Dare? de Arimasu" (Japanese: ケロロ え？我が輩…誰？みんな…誰？ であります)	March 10, 2006
The Keroro Platoon, along with Mois, Fuyuki and Natsumi suddenly don't remember who they are, and they all have to figure it out before a bomb explodes.
101	"The Keroro Platoon the Day Pekopon Stood Still!?"; Transliteration: "Keroro Shōtai Pekopon ga Seishisuru Hi!? de Arimasu" (Japanese: ケロロ小隊 ペコポンが静止する日!? であります)	March 17, 2006
The Garuru Platoon, a group of Keronian soldiers led by Giroro's older brother, descend on Pekopon. Seeking Keroro and the Kero Ball, they freeze nearly all life on Pekopon and swiftly defeat many of the Keroro Platoon's Pekoponian allies, while putting Giroro and Tamama out of commission.
102	"The Keroro Platoon Pekopon!! Impending Destruction of a Loved Planet!!"; Transliteration: "Keroro Shōtai Pekopon!! Horobi Yuku ka Ai no Hoshi yo!! de Arimasu" (Japanese: ケロロ小隊 ペコポン!!滅び行くか愛の星よ!! であります)	March 24, 2006
After Saburo is defeated by Zoruru, Natsumi dons her combat suit and sets out to rescue Keroro. However, backed into a corner, Keroro has been turned into Captain Keroro, a ruthless invader.
103	"Keroro Platoon the Sincerity That You Showed Me"; Transliteration: "Keroro Shōtai Magokoro o Kimi ni de Arimasu" (Japanese: ケロロ小隊 まごころを君に であります)	March 31, 2006
Fuyuki's sincere words awaken Keroro's true feelings, leading him to rally the Keroro Platoon for one decisive confrontation.
