= Chinese in Paris =

- Flim poster in 1974
- Directed by: Jean Yanne
- Produced by: Jean Yanne; Jean-Pierre Rassam
- Starring: Jean Yanne; Nicole Calfan
- Cinematography: Jean Boffety
- Music by: Michel Magne
- Release date: 28 February 1974
- Running time: 115 minutes
- Countries: France; Italy
- Language: French
- Box office: $12.4 million

Chinese in Paris (French: Les Chinois à Paris, pronounced [le ʃinwa a paʁi]; Italian: I cinesi a Parigi) is a 1974 French-Italian comedy film directed by Jean Yanne. The movie features an hypothetical Chinese invasion of western Europe and the life in Paris under communist Chinese rule.

== Cast ==
- Jean Yanne - Régis Forneret
- Nicole Calfan - Stéphanie
- Michel Serrault - Grégoire Montclair
- Kyōzō Nagatsuka - General Pou-Yen
- Jacques François - Hervé Sainfous de Montaubert
- Georges Wilson - Lefranc
- Macha Méril - Madeleine Fontanes
- Bernard Blier - President of France
- Paul Préboist - Civil servant
- Fernand Ledoux - Frugebelle
- Daniel Prévost - Albert Fontanes

== See also ==
- May 68
- Cultural Revolution
- Chinese community in Paris
