= Max mon amour =

1986 film by Nagisa Ōshima

- French Theatrical release poster
- Directed by: Nagisa Ōshima
- Written by: Nagisa Ōshima; Jean-Claude Carrière
- Produced by: Serge Silberman
- Starring: Charlotte Rampling; Anthony Higgins
- Cinematography: Raoul Coutard
- Edited by: Hélène Plemiannikov
- Music by: Michel Portal
- Distributed by: Acteurs Auteurs Associés (France); Milestone Film & Video (United States); Toho (Japan)
- Release dates: October 22, 1986 (France); May 23, 1987 (Japan)
- Running time: 97 minutes
- Countries: France; United States; Japan
- Languages: French; English

Max mon amour a.k.a. Max My Love is a 1986 comedy film directed by Nagisa Ōshima, starring Charlotte Rampling, Anthony Higgins, Victoria Abril, Pierre Étaix and Milena Vukotic. The screenplay was written by Ōshima and Jean-Claude Carrière, and the film was produced by Serge Silberman.

== Plot ==
Peter Jones, a British diplomat in France, suspects his wife Margaret of having an affair. He hires a private detective, who reports that Margaret has rented an apartment. It then turns out that her live-in lover is a pet chimpanzee she calls Max.

== Cast ==
- Charlotte Rampling as Margaret Jones
- Anthony Higgins as Peter Jones
- Victoria Abril as Maria
- Anne-Marie Besse as Suzanne
- Nicole Calfan as Hélène
- Pierre Étaix as Le détective / detective
- Bernard Haller as Robert
- Sabine Haudepin as Françoise, la prostituée
- Christopher Hovik as Nelson Jones
- Fabrice Luchini as Nicolas
- Diana Quick as Camille
- Milena Vukotic as Margaret's mother
- Bernard-Pierre Donnadieu as Archibald (as Bernard Pierre Donnadieu)
- Ailsa Berk as Max (uncredited)

== Production ==
Co-writer Carrière, producer Silberman and actor Vukotic were all frequent collaborators with Luis Buñuel, and the film resembles his work in its understated, unsensational treatment of frequently outrageous events.

== Release ==
The film was entered into the 1986 Cannes Film Festival.
