= Merli =

Merli is an Italian surname. Notable people with the surname include:

- Adalberto Maria Merli (born 1938), Italian actor
- Corrado Merli (born 1959), Italian footballer
- Danio Merli (born 1956), Italian sprint canoeist
- Francesco Merli (1887–1976), Italian opera singer
- Franco Merli (1956–2025), Italian actor
- Gino J. Merli (1924–2002), United States Army Medal of Honor recipient
- Maurizio Merli (1940–1989), Italian actor
- Reidar Merli (1917–2007), Norwegian wrestler
- Simone Merli, Italian Electronic musician and Music producer

== Other ==
- Merli is the name of a character, part of the Vocaloid software package.
- Merlí is a TV series produced by Catalan channel TV3.
