= The Suitor =

1962 film

- Directed by: Pierre Étaix
- Written by: Pierre Étaix; Jean-Claude Carrière
- Starring: Pierre Étaix
- Cinematography: Pierre Levent
- Edited by: Pierre Gillette
- Music by: Jean Paillaud
- Production companies: C.A.P.A.C. Copra Films
- Distributed by: Cocinor
- Release date: 12 November 1962
- Running time: 83 minutes
- Country: France
- Language: French

The Suitor (French: Le Soupirant) is a 1962 French comedy film directed by and starring Pierre Étaix. It was entered into the 13th Berlin International Film Festival and the 3rd Moscow International Film Festival.

The film is a slapstick farce that reworks the storyline of Buster Keaton's 1925 comedy Seven Chances, about a young man who is required to find a wife quickly.

== Cast ==
- Pierre Étaix as Pierre, the Suitor
- Laurence Lignères as Laurence
- Claude Massot as Father
- Denise Péronne as Mother (as Denise Perrone)
- Karin Vesely as Ilka
- France Arnel as Stella
- Lucien Frégis as The Painter
