= The Great Love (1969 film) =

1969 film

- Film poster
- Directed by: Pierre Étaix
- Written by: Jean-Claude Carrière; Pierre Étaix
- Produced by: Paul Claudon
- Starring: Pierre Étaix
- Cinematography: Jean Boffety
- Edited by: Henri Lanoë
- Music by: Claude Stieremans
- Release date: May 1969
- Running time: 87 minutes
- Country: France
- Language: French

The Great Love (French: Le Grand Amour) is a 1969 French comedy film directed by Pierre Étaix. It was entered into the 1969 Cannes Film Festival.

== Cast ==
- Pierre Étaix as Pierre
- Annie Fratellini as Florence
- Nicole Calfan as Agnès
- Alain Janey as Jacques
- Magali Clément as Irène
- Ketty France as Madame Girard
- Louis Maiss as Mr. Girard
- Jacqueline Rouillard as Madame Louise
- Billy Bourbon as Drunkard
- Micha Bayard as Bourget's secretary
- Claude Massot as Waiter

== Production ==
Filming took place in Tours.

== Reception ==
On review aggregator website Rotten Tomatoes, the film holds an approval rating of 100% based on 5 reviews, with an average rating of 7.8/10.
