= Paul Claudon =

French film producer (1919–2002)

- Born: 5 September 1919; Meurthe-et-Moselle, France
- Died: 5 July 2002 (aged 82)
- Occupations: Film producer, actor
- Years active: 1952–1998

Paul Claudon (5 September 1919 – 5 July 2002) was a French film producer and actor. He produced 25 films between 1952 and 1998. He was a member of the jury at the 21st Berlin International Film Festival and the 1979 Cannes Film Festival.

== Selected filmography ==
- Rumours (1947)
- Women Are Angels (1952)
- The Goose of Sedan (1959)
- Yo Yo (1965)
- The Great Love (1969)
- The Wedding Ring (1970)
- Going Places (1974)
- One-Eyed Men Are Kings (1974)
