= The Day the Clown Cried =

Unfinished and unreleased 1972 drama film

- The script cover for the film
- Directed by: Jerry Lewis
- Screenplay by: Jerry Lewis
- Story by: Joan O'Brien; Charles Denton
- Produced by: Nat Wachsberger
- Starring: Jerry Lewis; Harriet Andersson; Anton Diffring; Ulf Palme; Pierre Étaix
- Cinematography: Rune Ericson
- Edited by: Wic Kjellin
- Running time: 90 minutes
- Countries: Sweden; France
- Language: English

The Day the Clown Cried is an unfinished and unreleased 1972 drama film directed by and starring Jerry Lewis about a circus clown imprisoned in a Nazi concentration camp. A co-production between Sweden and France, it was based on an original screenplay by Joan O'Brien and Charles Denton, from a story idea by O'Brien, with additional material from Lewis.

The film has gained notoriety and mystique over the decades both for its controversial premise and as a well-known example of an unfinished film. Lewis repeatedly insisted that The Day the Clown Cried would never be released, but later donated an incomplete copy of the film to the Library of Congress in 2015 under the stipulation that it was not to be made available before June 2024. Several documentaries have featured some scenes from the film.

In August 2024, all five hours of the film's footage held by the Library of Congress was screened for journalist Benjamin Charles Germain Lee, who confirmed in a subsequent article that what exists is fragmentary and that a fully finished film does not exist in the Library's collection.

On 28 May 2025, the Swedish periodical Icon Magazine and SVT's Kulturnyheterna revealed that actor Hans Crispin possessed a complete workprint of the film. He had stolen and made a copy of the eight Swedish acts of the film while working at Europafilm in 1980, and in 1990 received an unexpected gift of a copy of the opening French act from a former colleague, completing it. He showed the film to journalists as proof. On 17 June it was reported to have been sold for a "modest sum", with Crispin not revealing the name of the buyer.

== Plot ==
Helmut Doork is a washed-up German circus clown during the beginning of World War II. Although he was once a famous performer who toured North America and Europe with the Ringling Brothers, Doork is now past his prime and receives little respect. After Doork causes an accident during a show, the head clown convinces the circus owner to demote Doork. Upon returning home, Doork confides his problems to his wife Ada, and she encourages him to stand up for himself. After going back to the circus, Doork overhears the circus owner agreeing to fire him after the head clown issues an ultimatum. A distraught Doork is arrested later by the Gestapo and the Schutzstaffel for drunkenly mocking Adolf Hitler in a bar. Following an interrogation at the Gestapo headquarters, he is imprisoned in a Nazi camp for political prisoners. For the next three to four years, he remains there while hoping for a trial and a chance to plead his case.

He tries to maintain his status among the other inmates by bragging about what a famous performer he once was. His only friend in prison is a good-hearted German named Johann Keltner, whose reason for being interned is never fully revealed but is implied to be his outspoken opposition to the Nazis. The camp receives a large group of Jewish prisoners, including several children. The other prisoners goad Doork into performing for them, but he does not realize that he actually is not very good. The other prisoners beat him up and leave him in the courtyard to sulk about his predicament. He sees a group of Jewish children laughing at him from the other side of the camp, where the Jewish prisoners are being kept away from everyone else. Delighted to be appreciated again, Doork performs for them and gains an audience for a while, until the new prison commandant orders that he stop.

Doork learns that fraternizing with Jewish prisoners is strictly forbidden. Unable to leave the children in a state of unhappiness, he continues to perform for them. The SS guards break up one of his performances; they knock him unconscious and warn the children away from the barbed-wire fence. Horrified, Keltner fights off one of the guards, but he is quickly cornered and beaten to death. Doork is placed in solitary confinement. Seeing a use for him, the commandant assigns him to help load Jewish children on trains leading out of the internment camp, with the promise his case will be reviewed. By a twist of fate, he ends up accidentally accompanying the children on a boxcar train to Auschwitz, and he is eventually used, in Pied Piper fashion, to help lead the Jewish children to their deaths in the gas chamber.

Knowing the fear the children will feel, he begs to be allowed to spend their last few moments with him. Leading them to the gas "showers", he becomes increasingly dependent on a miracle, but there is none. He is so filled with remorse that he remains with them, taking a young girl's hand and walking with them into the chamber.

== Cast ==
- Jerry Lewis as Helmut Doork
- Harriet Andersson as Ada Doork
- Anton Diffring as Colonel Bestler
- Ulf Palme as Johann Keltner
- Pierre Étaix as Gustav the Great
- Tomas Bolme as Adolf
- Jonas Bergström as Franz
- Bo Brundin as Ludwig
- Lars Amble as Concentration Camp Guard
- Sven Lindberg, Fredrik Ohlsson as German Officers
- Ulf Palme, John Elfström, Tor Isedal, Curt Broberg and Ulf von Zweigbergk as prisoners
- Heinz Hopf, Carl Billquist as Gestapo Officers
- Nils Eklund as Bartender
- Egil Holmsen as Camp Guard
- Åke Lindman as Stout Prisoner

== Production ==
=== Development ===
In 1971, while performing at the Olympia Theatre, Lewis met with producer Nat Wachsberger, who offered him the chance to star in and direct the film with complete financial backing from his production company and Europa Studios. Before he had been given the offer, several stars such as Bobby Darin, Milton Berle, and Dick Van Dyke were also approached, but declined. Lewis was initially reluctant to take the role, especially after reading the script, stating in his autobiography Jerry Lewis in Person, "The thought of playing Helmut still scared the hell out of me". In addition, he felt that he was wrong for the part, due to the strong subject matter. He asked Wachsberger:

Why don't you try to get Sir Laurence Olivier? I mean, he doesn't find it too difficult to choke to death playing Hamlet. My bag is comedy, Mr. Wachsberger, and you're asking me if I'm prepared to deliver helpless kids into a gas chamber? Ho-ho. Some laugh—how do I pull it off?

— Jerry Lewis

However, after re-reading Joan O'Brien and Charles Denton's first draft, Lewis felt that he would be doing something worthwhile in portraying the horrors of the Holocaust. He signed on to the project, but, in order to make it, he first had to arrange to perform at Caesars Palace in Las Vegas for a month, in order to fulfill the terms of his contract with the hotel. In February 1972, he toured the remains of Auschwitz and Dachau concentration camps and shot some exterior views of buildings in Paris for the film, all the while reworking the script. He lost thirty-five pounds in six weeks by eating nothing but grapefruit.

=== Filming ===
Principal photography began in Sweden during April 1972, but the shoot was beset by numerous problems. Film equipment was either lost or delivered late, and the necessary money was nowhere in sight. Lewis was repeatedly assured that money was forthcoming by Wachsberger, who did not appear at all on set.

Wachsberger not only ran out of money before completing the film, but his option to produce the film expired before filming began. He had paid O'Brien the initial $5,000 fee, but failed to send her the additional $30,000 due her prior to production. Lewis claimed to have paid production costs with $2,000,000 of his own money to finish shooting the film, but the parties involved in its production were never able to come to terms that would allow the film to be released. O'Brien was shown a rough cut of the film in an attempt to acquire the necessary rights to release the film, but after viewing the product decided that it was not fit for release and, therefore, did not enter into an agreement with the producers or Lewis for the unauthorized, derivative work. After shooting wrapped, Lewis announced to the press that Wachsberger had failed to make good on his financial obligations or even commit to producing. Wachsberger retaliated by threatening to file a lawsuit of breach of contract and stated that he had enough to finish and release the film without Lewis. Wanting to ensure the film would not be lost, Lewis took a rough cut of the film, while the studio retained the entire film negative. On February 23, 1973, Lewis appeared as guest on The Dick Cavett Show, where he stated that the film would complete editing in six to seven weeks, that it had been invited to premiere at the Cannes Film Festival in May, and that it would be released in America after that. The film was never officially released and remains un-releasable due to the failure to secure the underlying rights from O'Brien.

== Criticism and changes ==
The film became a source of legend almost immediately after its production. In May 1992, an article in Spy magazine quoted comedian and actor Harry Shearer, who saw a rough cut of the film in 1979:

With most of these kinds of things, you find that the anticipation, or the concept, is better than the thing itself. But seeing this film was really awe-inspiring, in that you are rarely in the presence of a perfect object. This was a perfect object. This movie is so drastically wrong, its pathos and its comedy are so wildly misplaced, that you could not, in your fantasy of what it might be like, improve on what it really is. "Oh, My God!"—that's all you can say.

— Harry Shearer, Spy magazine, 1992

Shearer, who did not know Lewis during the latter's lifetime, gave his opinion why Lewis would make the film: he believed "the Academy can't ignore this". When asked to sum up the experience of the film overall, he responded by saying that the closest he could come was like "if you flew down to Tijuana and suddenly saw a painting on black velvet of Auschwitz. You'd just think 'My God, wait a minute!' It's not funny, and it's not good, and somebody's trying too hard in the wrong direction to convey this strongly held feeling."

The Spy article quoted Joan O'Brien as saying the rough cut she saw was a "disaster". It also says she and the original script's co-author, Charles Denton, will never allow the film to be released, in part due to changes in the script made by Lewis that made the clown more sympathetic and Emmett Kelly-like. In the original script, the protagonist was an arrogant, self-centered clown named Karl Schmidt, who was "a real bastard", according to O'Brien. Her script reportedly had him trying to use his wife, who knew the ringmaster, to get him a better gig, and he apparently informed on nearly everyone he knew after being interrogated for mocking Hitler. She stated that the original draft was about the redemption of a selfish man, but that Lewis practically changed the entire story into a Chaplinesque dark comedy à la The Great Dictator.

== Historical controversy and praise ==
From 1949 to 1972, Lewis was known primarily for slapstick and sight gag comedy. Although he stated the film was a drama, there was a perception he would make irreverent humor from serious and horrific events. This production, ten years before his first major dramatic film role in The King of Comedy, persuaded some that he was unsuited to the role. However, that did not prevent filmmaker Jean-Luc Godard from saying in an interview with Dick Cavett, "it is a great idea", "a beautiful idea", and that Lewis "should be supported" in his efforts.

In the June 2001 Spin article "Always Leave 'Em Laughing", author Bowman Hastie writes of Life Is Beautiful and Jakob the Liar, similar themed Holocaust films released twenty-plus years after Lewis' The Day the Clown Cried, "All three movies shamelessly use the Holocaust—and the impending death of children—as a vehicle for the star's most base, maudlin ideas about his own beneficent selflessness and humanity. But only Lewis has been vilified for it."

In the same article, comedian Janeane Garofalo provided a hint to another issue that has dogged Lewis' production: ridicule. An often polarizing figure, Lewis had detractors. Garofalo said, "Lewis's public criticism of younger comics ... only fuels Clown obsessives." Public readings of the script at comedy venues, halted by a cease and desist order (not by Lewis), provided opportunities to mock, as well as four decades of jokes and relentless interrogation of Lewis, shaped a perverse perception of the film.

In 2006, writer and editor Lawrence Levi wrote of his interview with Michael Barclay, who in 1991 was planning a new production of Clown, "The Clown screenplay was brilliant ... most of what has been written about the film is incorrect or unfair; he was particularly incensed by the comments of Harry Shearer (quoted in Spy 1992)."

On July 18, 2012, French director Xavier Giannoli stated on the France Inter film show Pendant les travaux, le cinéma reste ouvert that he had managed to track down a 75-minute copy of the film and that he had shown it to a number of people, among whom was French film critic Jean-Michel Frodon. In 2013, Frodon published a text dedicated to the film titled "Jerry Made his Day" in the anthology The Last Laugh. Strange Humors of Cinema edited by Murray Pomerance. The French version of the same text, titled "Le Jour de Jerry, et la nuit", was later published in the film journal Trafic.

In an interview published in 2017, Frodon claimed to have seen a copy of the film in 2004 or 2005 owned by Giannoli. Frodon did not know how Giannoli obtained his copy and Giannoli declined a request for comment. Frodon reported that while the copy he watched was obviously a rough preliminary edit, it generally followed the published script and did not seem to be missing any major story elements. His experience viewing the film is as follows,

I'm convinced it is a very good job. It's a very interesting and important film, very daring about both the issue, which of course is the Holocaust, but even beyond that as a story of a man who has dedicated his life to making people laugh and is questioning what it is to make people laugh. I think it is a very bitter film, and a disturbing film, and this is why it was so brutally dismissed by those people who saw it, or elements of it, including writers of the script.

— Jean-Michel Frodon, Vanity Fair 2017

Frodon further denies there is any sentimentality in the film, calling it "very meaningful" and stating Lewis is "not indulging himself, he is self-caricaturing. He is playing a very unsympathetic character. He's selfish and totally stupid. ... The film finds what I consider a cinematic answer to some real, serious issues, using a kind of stylized setting, both in the costumes and the sets. It's not pretending to be realistic. Instead, it has a very obvious fairy-tale feeling—not fairy tale, but tale. ... There are details like in the Grimm Brothers." and "For me, one of the many elements that draw such negative reaction to the film in the U.S. is that this performance is very far from what is expected from him." It was one of the earliest mainstream films to deal with the Holocaust and to directly depict the Nazi concentration camps.

== Lewis interviews and responses ==
Due to the film's mystery and mythology, Lewis faced decades of questions by reporters. Lewis offered the opinion that it was all bad, an artistic failure because "I lost the magic". Quoted in Entertainment Weekly: "You will never see it. No one will ever see it, because I am embarrassed at the poor work." In 2001, an inquisitive heckler mentioned the film to Lewis during one of Lewis's motivational speeches, indicating that the man had heard the film might be eventually released. Lewis replied to this comment with "None of your goddamn business!" The same year, Lewis responded to a reporter's faxed request for information about the movie by calling and telling him: "As far as discussing [the movie], forget it! If you want to see any of it, forget it!"

Towards the end of his life, Lewis was more receptive to inquiries about the film, though he maintained it would never be released. On January 12, 2013, Lewis appeared at a Cinefamily Q&A event at the Los Angeles Silent Movie Theatre. He was asked by actor Bill Allen, "Are we ever gonna get to see The Day the Clown Cried?" Lewis replied in the negative, and explained the reason the movie would never be released was because "in terms of that film I was embarrassed. I was ashamed of the work, and I was grateful that I had the power to contain it all, and never let anyone see it. It was bad, bad, bad." He then jokingly added, "But I'll tell you how it ends." At Cannes while promoting Max Rose, Lewis was asked about The Day the Clown Cried and said, "It was bad work. You'll never see it and neither will anyone else."

In October 2012, Australian-based film production company Traces Films recorded one of the most candid and emotional interviews with Jerry Lewis about The Day the Clown Cried. He states in his own words his motivation for taking on the project and his feelings during filmmaking.

If I was able to do it again, I would do it. I was going ahead like every studio wanted it, but it was the reverse. They turned away from it. Except me. That made it more appetizing to me. I believed it could be a black mark against people who felt strength from hate. I feel weak from hate. The thing that hooked me the most was that the children in the (goddamn) concentration camp were taken to the ovens by the clown and that struck me. I was frightened, but you stay and beat that because you have more important work to do. It's difficult to talk about this project in a way that everyone will understand it.

— Jerry Lewis

He further went on to say regarding the emotional toll and difficulty of the subject matter, "I had a talk with myself in the mirror and I said 'Understand one day you'll feel great and the next day you'll want to throw up because reading it disgusts you but playing it is a double disgust'." He said to The New York Times, "There's something about the risk, the courage that it takes to face the risk. ... I'm not going to get greatness unless I have to go at it with fear and uncertainty."

In a 2013 interview with Lewis, Chris Nashawaty of Entertainment Weekly wrote, 'When asked about all the speculation surrounding the film, he (Lewis) said, "I think it's like bad advertising."'

For it to become what it has become seems unfair—unfair to the project and unfair to my good intentions." Clown's infamy has grown so large, he added, that it now has to be either "better than Citizen Kane or the worst piece of shit that anyone ever loaded on the projector."

— Jerry Lewis

== Legacy ==
According to Richard Brody of The New Yorker, the film's grim portrayal of the Holocaust "was, at the very least, unusual and original".

In the 2016 documentary The Last Laugh, which explored the limits of humor regarding the Holocaust, comedian David Cross reflected Lewis was "too ahead of his time. If he had waited 25 years, then he'd be bounding over those seats grabbing his Oscar". Similarly Amy Wallace in GQ Magazine wrote: "He was mercilessly criticized for attempting to mix comedy with the ultimate tragedy. However, in 1999, when Roberto Benigni's Life Is Beautiful won three Oscars for a similar story line, many noted that Lewis had tried it first."

After Lewis's death in August 2017, Richard Brody of The New Yorker wrote,

I don’t know whether the film is as bad as Lewis himself has said that it is. The point is that, in the early 1970s, when the very term 'the Holocaust' was hardly known and when the extermination of six million Jews by Nazi Germany was a little-discussed phenomenon, at a time before Claude Lanzmann made Shoah, Lewis took it on. He may have been naïve to do so with a twist of comedy, he may have been naïve to do so with such uncompromisingly direct and untroubled cinematic representation—but he also went where other directors didn't dare to go, taking on the horrific core of modern history and confronting its horrors. What childhood can there be with such knowledge, and what comedy? The moral complicity, the self-scourging accusation of the role of the clown in amusing children en route to their destruction, is itself as furious a challenge to himself, and to the entertainment of the time, as any by the most severe critic of media.

Lewis was at the forefront of what became a Hollywood genre, films exploring the events and personal experiences of the Holocaust. He was doing so at a time of virtually no Holocaust scholarship in academia, minimal recognition of the loss of European Yiddish culture, with limited public documentation, and only the initial stirrings of survivor testimonies.

== Viewings and footage ==
In 1972, Flemish public service broadcaster BRT aired a documentary on the film as part of the show Première-Magazine. It included behind-the-scenes footage shot in a Paris circus and some takes with sound from the film. They re-released it 40 years later, in 2012. That same year, the Jerry Lewis official museum website stated: "The film (is) tied up in litigation... and all of the parties involved have never been able to reach an agreeable settlement. Jerry hopes to someday complete the film, which remains to this day a significant expression of cinematic art, suspended in the abyss of international litigation".

On August 5, 2015, the Los Angeles Times reported that Lewis had donated a copy of the film to the Library of Congress, under the stipulation that it not be screened for about a decade. The Library of Congress intends to eventually screen it at its Audio Visual Conservation campus in Culpeper, Virginia. Rob Stone, curator of the Library of Congress, has stated that they would not be able to loan the film to other theaters or museums without permission from Lewis' estate. Stone has also stated that they do not have any intent to release the film in any form of home media.

On February 3, 2016, German public TV ARD aired a 2-hour documentary called Der Clown which includes interviews, a 31-minute version of original footage, re-staged scenes from the original scripts with some Swedish actors from the original, and an interview with Lewis. The documentary was later released on DVD and shown theatrically at the Deutsches Filminstitute. Der Clown was also posted online but later removed.

In a December 2018 article for The New York Times, Stone stated that the Library does not have a complete print of the film. That same year, a public auction of items from the Lewis estate included an original annotated Clown script, polaroids of exteriors and an original costume.

In a January 2019 interview with World Over, Lewis's son Chris stated there is no complete negative of the film and that outstanding copyright issues prevented a release.

In August 2024, the Library of Congress' complete footage from the film was screened privately for The New Republic's Benjamin Charles Germain Lee. In Lee's article about the experience, he described being shown five hours of footage that was "fragmentary, nonsequential, (at times) without sound, and filled largely with behind-the-scenes shots and repeated takes of just a few scenes from the end of the film" concluding that the film "does not exist in final form" amongst the Library's holdings.

In September 2024, a documentary on The Day the Clown Cried entitled From Darkness to Light premiered at the Venice International Film Festival. It includes several scenes from the original film. On May 28, 2025, Swedish actor Hans Crispin claimed to be in possession of a full workprint of the film, showing it to journalists as proof. On June 17 it was reported to have been sold for a "modest sum", with Crispin not revealing the name of the buyer.

== Early possible remakes ==
Jim Wright revealed to the press his plan to produce a new version of The Day the Clown Cried, and he mentioned he had Richard Burton in mind for the title role. Despite major buzz about the project, nothing concrete came out of the planning stages. By 1991, producer Michael Barclay announced that he and Tex Rudloff (apparently with the help of Washington lobbyist Jack Abramoff) were preparing a joint production of Clown with the Russian film studio Lenfilm. Robin Williams had allegedly been offered the leading role and given a copy of the script. Jeremy Kagan, who made The Chosen (1981), reportedly was slated to direct the film, but once again the idea was dropped before it was officially greenlit. In 1994, William Hurt was considered to play the role, but nothing came to fruition.

Discussion of the film in the mainstream press was rekindled in the late 1990s due to the release of two films with similar themes, Life Is Beautiful (1997) and the remake of Jakob the Liar (1999). The latter starred Robin Williams, whose name had previously been attached to the planned remake. The film Adam Resurrected (2009), adapted from Yoram Kaniuk's novel of the same name published in 1968, has also drawn comparisons.

== See also ==
- List of Holocaust films
- List of World War II films
