= The Diary of a Chambermaid =

The Diary of a Chambermaid may refer to:

- The Diary of a Chambermaid (novel), a 1900 novel by Octave Mirbeau, and its adaptations:
  - The Diary of a Chambermaid (1946 film), an American drama directed by Jean Renoir
  - Diary of a Chambermaid (1964 film), an Italian-French satirical drama directed by Luis Buñuel
  - Diary of a Chambermaid (2015 film), a French drama directed by Benoît Jacquot
  - The Diary of a Chambermaid (2026 film), a French-Romanian drama directed Radu Jude
