= Lucien (Mirbeau) =

- First appearance: Dans le ciel (In the sky) (1892-1893)
- Created by: Octave Mirbeau

In-universe information
- Species: Human
- Gender: Male
- Occupation: Painter
- Nationality: French

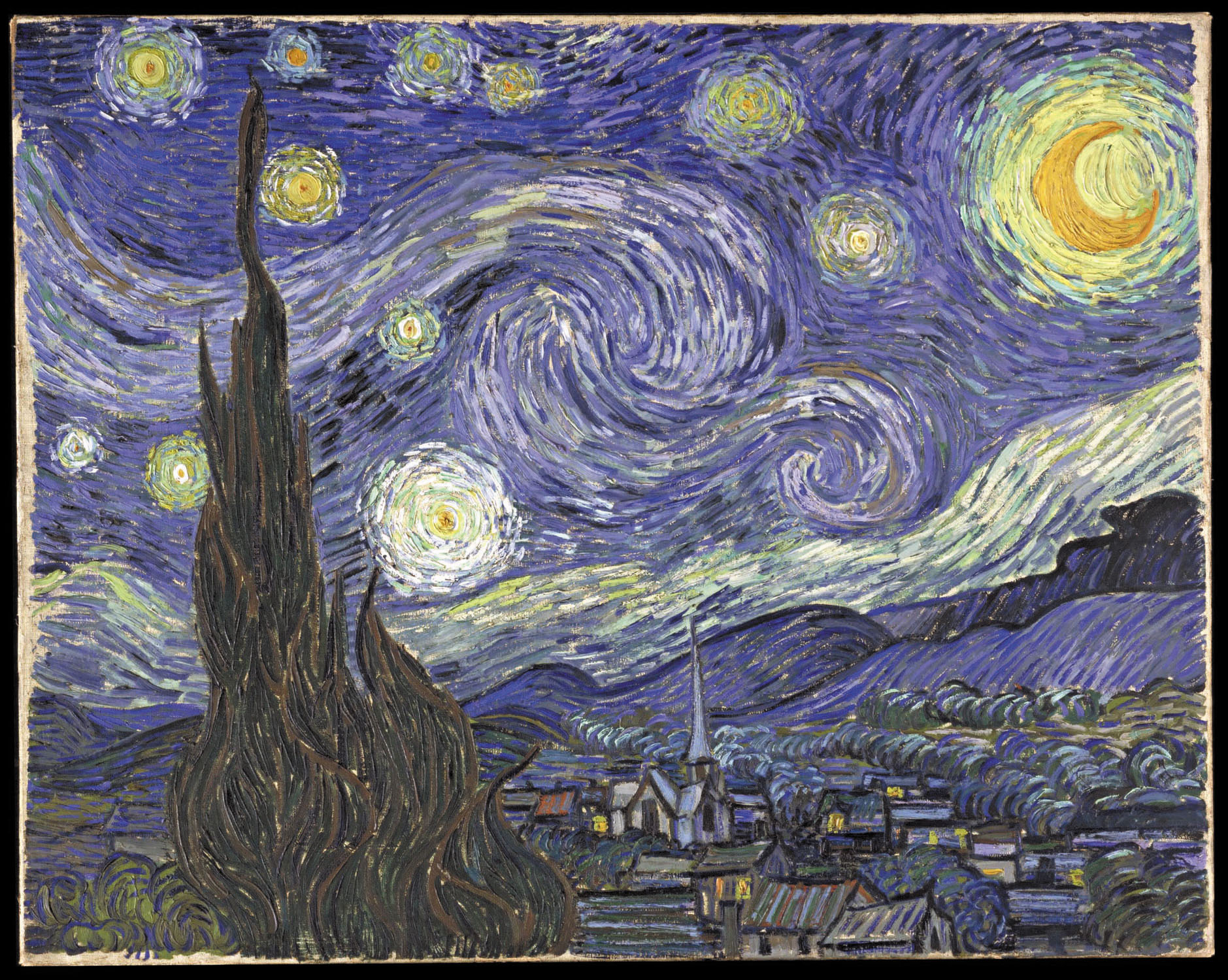
Vincent van Gogh, The Starry Night, 1889 (Museum of Modern Art, New York). In Dans le ciel, this painting was attributed by Mirbeau to Lucien.

Lucien is one of the central fictional characters in the 1892-93 novel Dans le ciel (In the Sky), by French writer Octave Mirbeau.

== The tragedy of an artist ==
He is the friend of the embedded narrator, Georges, to whom he has bequeathed his house, situated on a fantastic mountain peak that rises vertiginously into the sky. Lucien is modeled on Vincent van Gogh, whose paintings The Irises and The Sunflowers} Mirbeau himself had purchased, and whose masterpiece The Starry Night is attributed to Lucien. However, while considering the Dutch artist to be entirely sane, Mirbeau portrays Lucien as becoming gradually unhinged. Still, Lucien is meant to be taken as an entirely imaginary character, in no way a faithful rendering of his real-life counterpart.

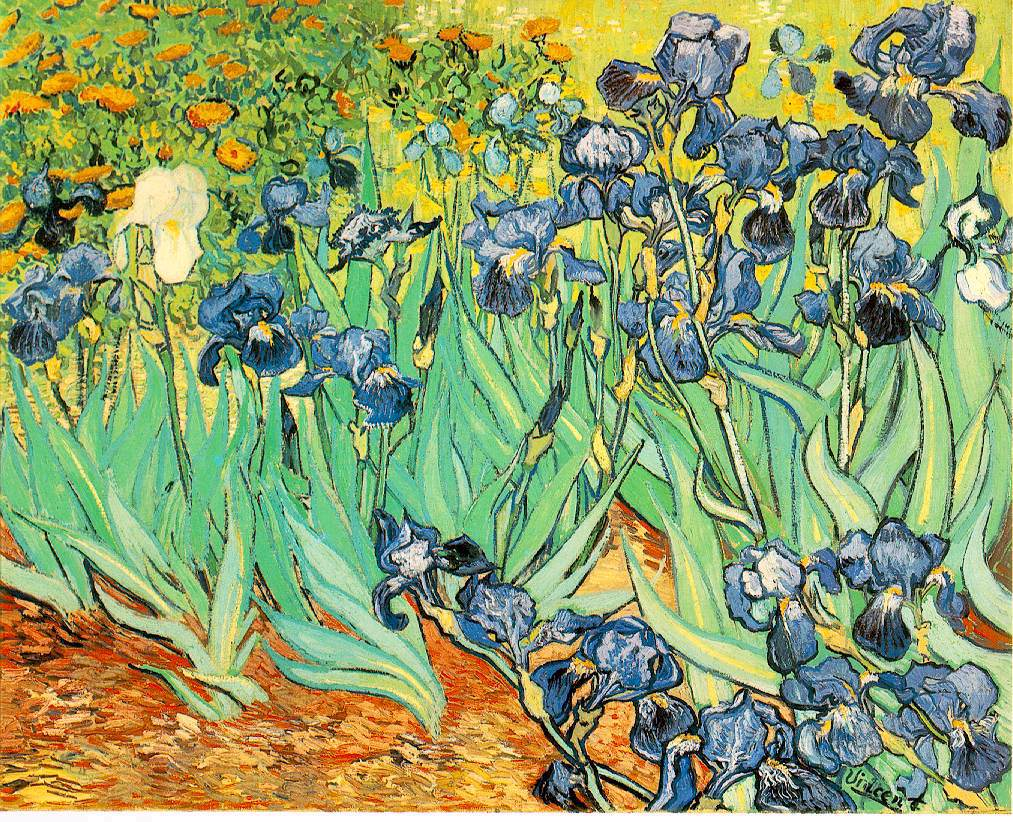
Vincent van Gogh, Irises. Mirbeau was the first owner of this painting.

Like Clara in Le Jardin des supplices (The Torture Garden) and Célestine in Le Journal d'une femme de chambre (The Diary of a Chambermaid), Lucien is given no last name. The son of a butcher, Lucien had had the good fortune to emerge « sound in mind and body from the stupefying regimen of secondary school », and thereafter, against the wishes of his father, had elected to become a painter – in the same way that l'Abbé Jules, from the novel of the same name, had chosen to become a priest, « By God! » Lucien's artistic credo can be reduced to the formula he never tires of repeating: « See, feel, understand. »

But Lucien's conception of art remains confused, as he moves back and forth between Impressionism, Divisionism, and Expressionism. Never able to express his ideal of art in words, he aims too high, and the works he completes are always tragically inferior to those that he imagines, the works that his refractory hand is incapable of executing: « The deeper that I penetrate into the inexpressible and supernatural mystery of nature, the weaker and more impotent I feel in the face of such beauty. Perhaps one can conceive of nature vaguely in one's mind, but rendering that conception by using the crude, awkward, and untrustworthy instrument of the hand – that, I believe, is beyond one's human capabilities. » Thus, in the course of his development as a character – having forgotten his original convictions and lost himself in the aesthetic of the Symbolists and Pre-Raphaelites, whom Octave Mirbeau had earlier skewered in his Combats esthétiques – Lucien ends by committing suicide after cutting off his “guilty” hand.

In creating a character who constantly challenges himself, who constantly aspires to an absolute that is impossible and unattainable, Mirbeau explores the tragedy of an artist who is uncompromising, unwilling to conform to the academic traditions of art, and who, rather than submitting to them, confronts head-on the institutionalized prejudices encountered in the world of politics, the fine arts, and a public inhospitable to change.

== Bibliography ==
- Samuel Lair, « Octave Mirbeau et le personnage du peintre », Cahiers d'études du récit français, n° XX, Université de Brest, 2004, p. 119-129.
- Maeva Monta, « Dans le ciel, un détournement de la figure de l'ekphrasis », Cahiers Octave Mirbeau, n° 18, 2011, p. 35-49.
- Robert Ziegler, « The Uncreated Artwork in Mirbeau's Dans le ciel », Nineteenth-Century French Studies , winter 2007, vol. 35, n° 2, p. 439-452.
