= 2024 National Society of Film Critics Awards =

Awards for films from 2024

59th NSFC Awards
- Date: January 4, 2025

Highlights
- Best Picture: Nickel Boys

The 59th National Society of Film Critics Awards, given on January 4, 2025, honored the best in film for 2024.

RaMell Ross's Nickel Boys, Payal Kapadia's All We Imagine as Light, Mike Leigh's Hard Truths, Jesse Eisenberg's A Real Pain, and the documentary film No Other Land all received the most awards with two wins each. The former film was named Best Picture, while Kapadia won Best Director.

== Winners ==
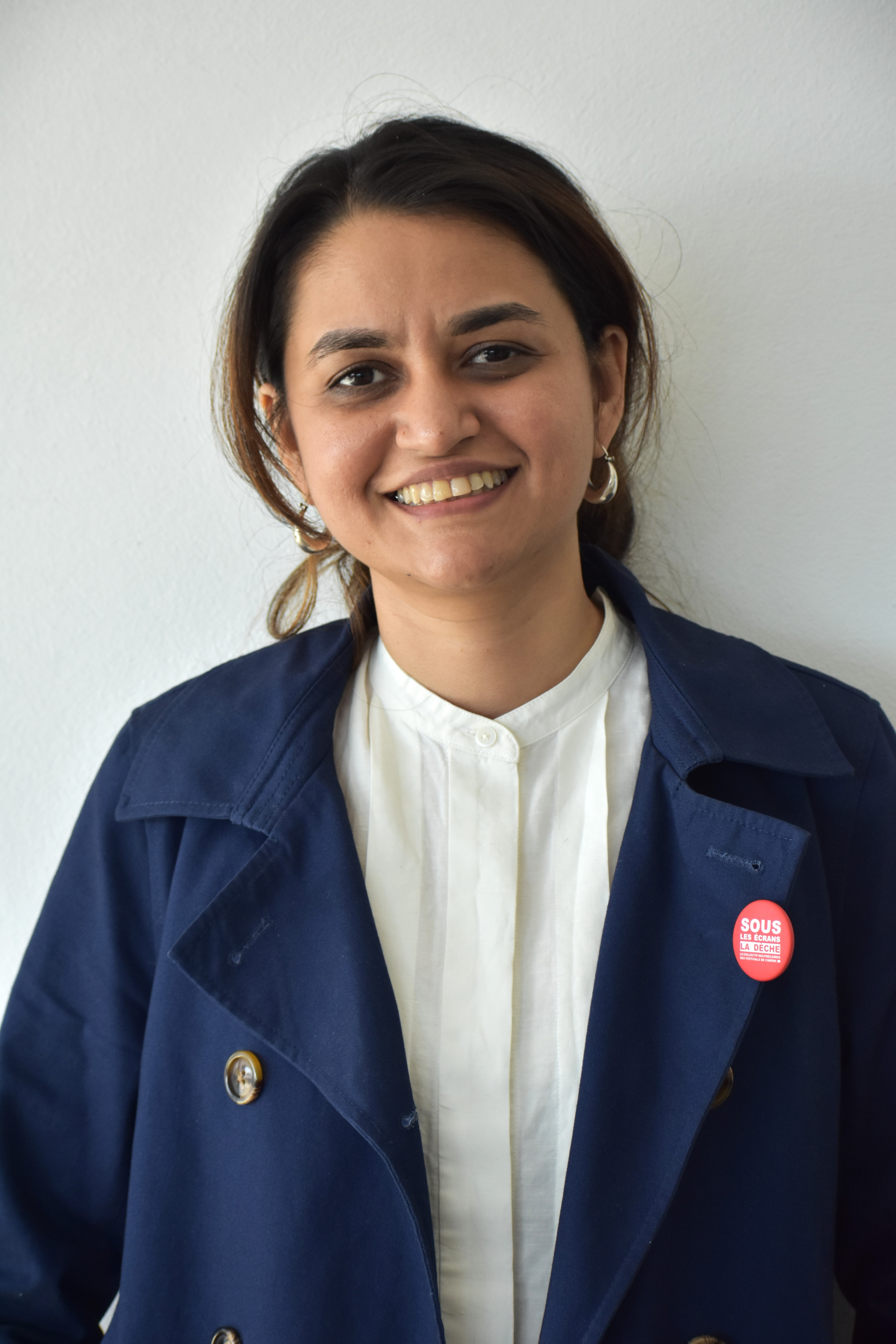
Payal Kapadia, Best Director winner

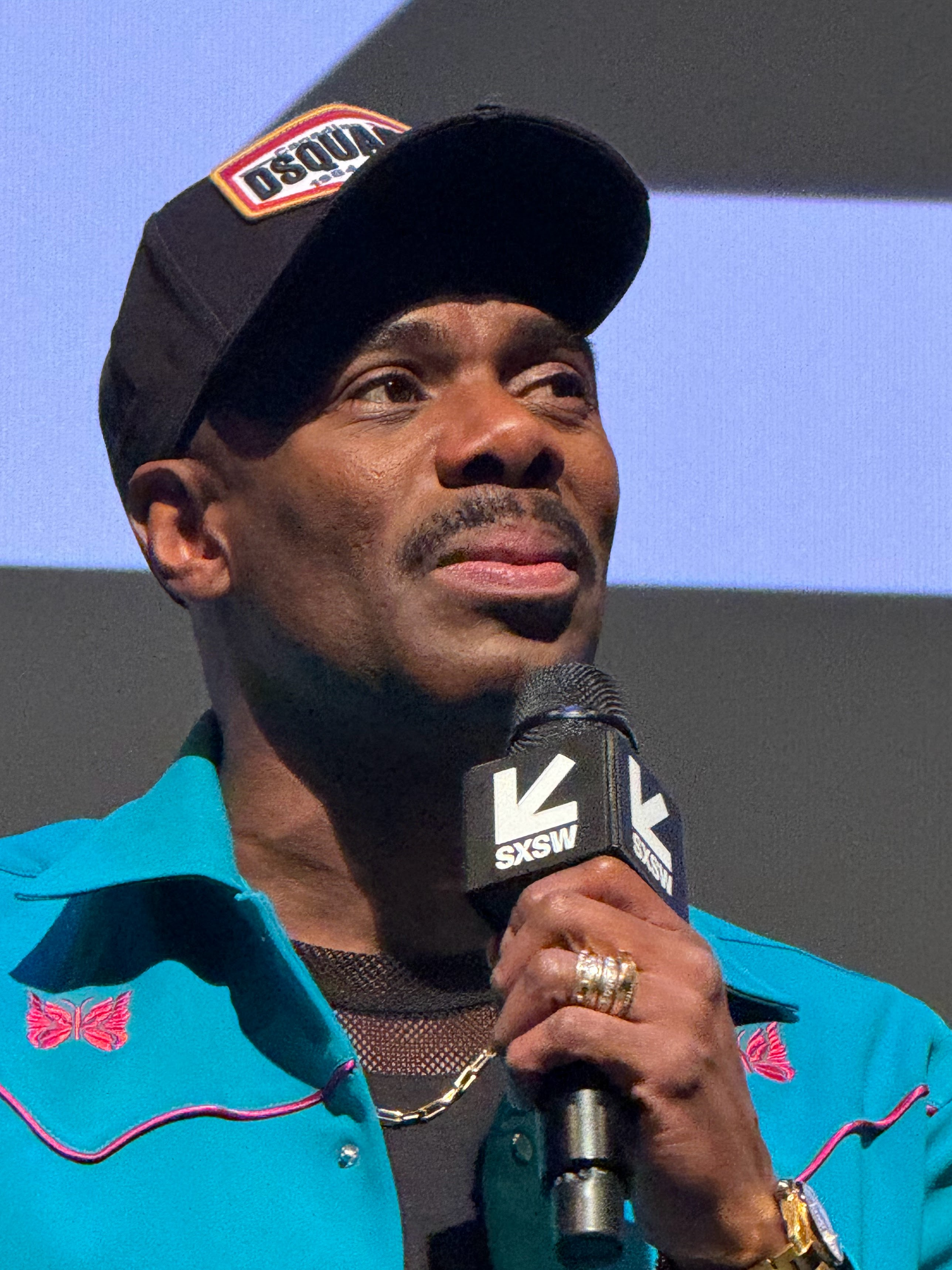
Colman Domingo, Best Actor winner

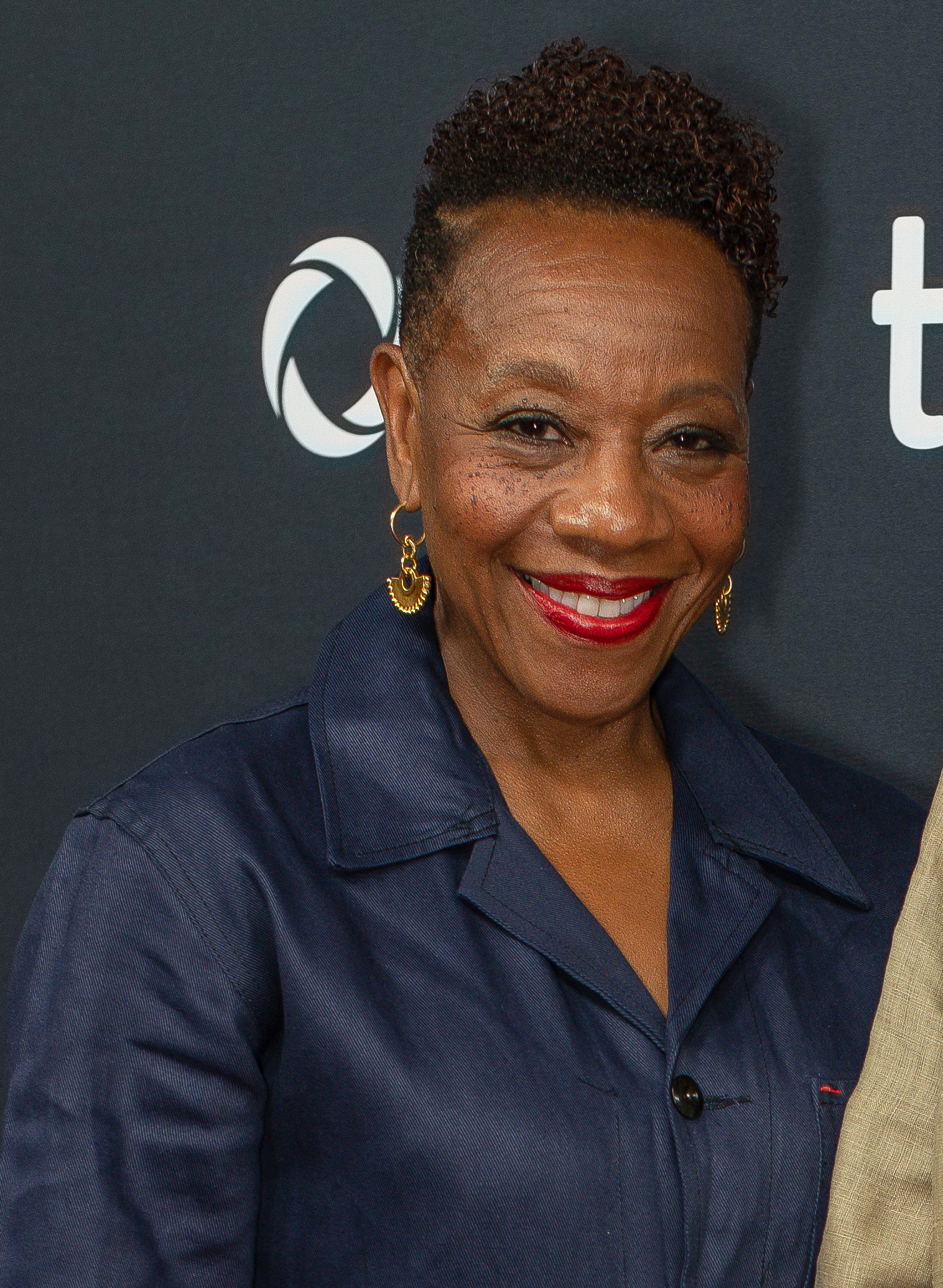
Marianne Jean-Baptiste, Best Actress winner

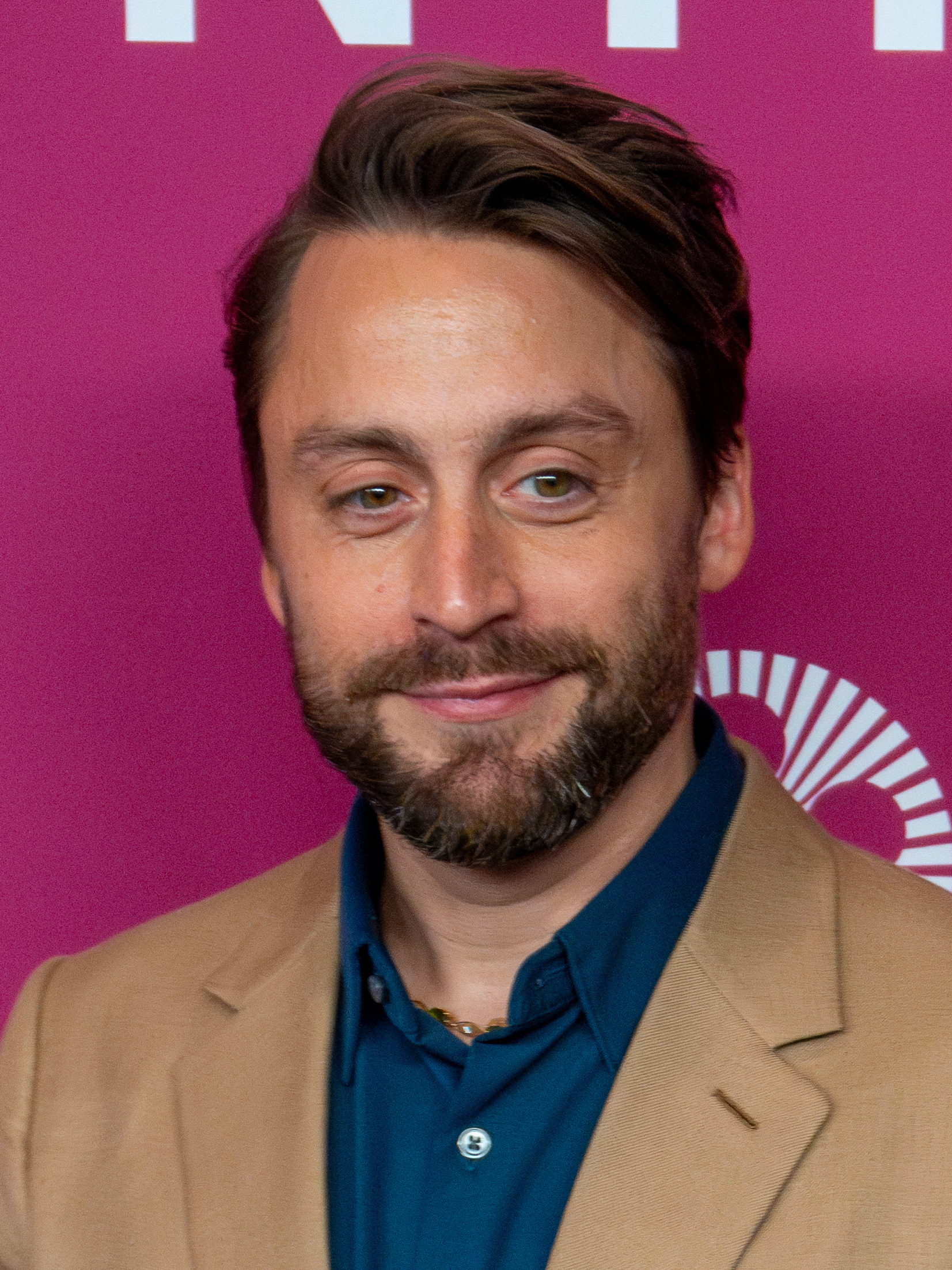
Kieran Culkin, Best Supporting Actor winner

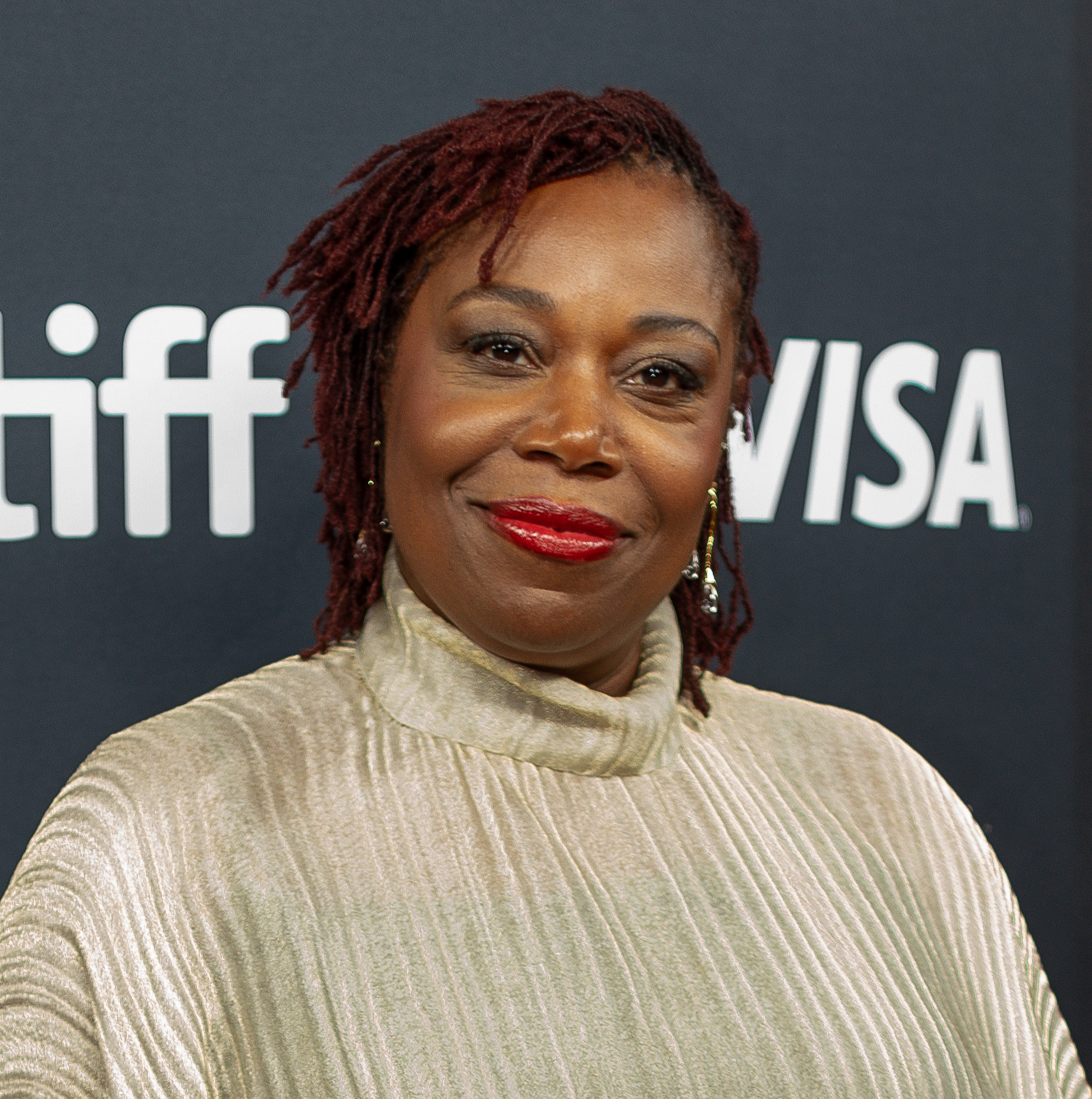
Michele Austin, Best Supporting Actress winner

Winners are listed in boldface along with the runner-up positions and counts from the final round:

=== Best Picture ===
1. **Nickel Boys** (47)
2. Anora / All We Imagine as Light (34) **(TIE)**

=== Best Director ===
1. **Payal Kapadia – All We Imagine as Light** (49)
2. RaMell Ross – Nickel Boys (42)
3. Sean Baker – Anora (33)

=== Best Actor ===
1. **Colman Domingo – Sing Sing** (60)
2. Adrien Brody – The Brutalist (51)
3. Ralph Fiennes – Conclave (45)

=== Best Actress ===
1. **Marianne Jean-Baptiste – Hard Truths** (79)
2. Mikey Madison – Anora (35)
3. Ilinca Manolache – Do Not Expect Too Much from the End of the World (32)

=== Best Supporting Actor ===
1. **Kieran Culkin – A Real Pain** (52)
2. Guy Pearce – The Brutalist (50)
3. Edward Norton – A Complete Unknown / Adam Pearson – A Different Man (41) **(TIE)**

=== Best Supporting Actress ===
1. **Michele Austin – Hard Truths** (55)
2. Aunjanue Ellis-Taylor – Nickel Boys / Natasha Lyonne – His Three Daughters (39) **(TIE)**

=== Best Screenplay ===
1. **Jesse Eisenberg – A Real Pain** (47)
2. Radu Jude – Do Not Expect Too Much from the End of the World (46)
3. Sean Baker – Anora (45)

=== Best Cinematography ===
1. **Jomo Fray – Nickel Boys** (80)
2. Lol Crawley – The Brutalist (38)
3. Jarin Blaschke – Nosferatu (21)

=== Best Film Not in the English Language ===
1. **All We Imagine as Light** (44)
2. Do Not Expect Too Much from the End of the World (41)
3. The Seed of the Sacred Fig (28)

=== Best Nonfiction Film ===
1. **No Other Land** (70)
2. Dahomey (50)
3. Soundtrack to a Coup d'Etat (24)

=== Best Experimental Film ===
- Madeleine Hunt-Ehrlich's The Ballad of Suzanne Césaire

=== Film Heritage Award ===
- Scott Eyman, "for his outstanding books on film artists and epochal shifts in moviemaking, most recently with Charlie Chaplin vs. America: When Art, Sex, and Politics Collided (2023), a revelatory study on the nexus of American politics and American pop culture."
- IndieCollect, "which, since its founding in 2010 by Sandra Schulberg, has met the challenge of preserving independent films with a rare sense of artistic responsibility."
- To Save and Project: The MoMa International Festival of Film Preservation, "for more than two decades of superb restorations and diverse programming from all over the world, in collaboration with archives, foundations, studios and other organizations."

=== Special Citation for a Film Awaiting U.S. Distribution ===
- Basel Adra, Hamdan Ballal, Yuval Abraham, and Rachel Szor's No Other Land
