= Diary of a Chambermaid (2015 film) =

2015 French drama film

- Theatrical release poster
- Directed by: Benoît Jacquot
- Screenplay by: Benoît Jacquot; Hélène Zimmer
- Based on: The Diary of a Chambermaid by Octave Mirbeau
- Produced by: Jean-Pierre Guérin; Kristina Larsen; Delphine Tomson; Luc Dardenne; Jean-Pierre Dardenne
- Starring: Léa Seydoux; Vincent Lindon
- Cinematography: Romain Winding
- Edited by: Julia Grégory
- Music by: Bruno Coulais
- Production companies: Les Films du Lendemain; JPG Films; Les Films du Fleuve
- Distributed by: Mars Distribution
- Release dates: 7 February 2015 (Berlin); 1 April 2015 (France)
- Running time: 95 minutes
- Countries: France; Belgium
- Language: French
- Budget: $8.2 million
- Box office: $2 million

Diary of a Chambermaid (French: Journal d'une femme de chambre) is a 2015 French drama film directed by Benoît Jacquot, co-written with Hélène Zimmer and based on Octave Mirbeau's 1900 novel of the same name. It stars Léa Seydoux as Célestine, a young and ambitious woman who works as a chambermaid for a wealthy couple in France during the early twentieth century. Mirbeau's original novel was adapted into films multiple times before, notably Jean Renoir's 1946 film and Luis Buñuel's 1964 film.

The film had its world premiere at the main competition of the 65th Berlin International Film Festival on 7 February 2015, where it was nominated for the Golden Bear. It was theatrically released in France by Mars Distribution on 1 April.

== Plot ==
In Normandy at the end of the 19th century, a beautiful and ambitious young chambermaid named Célestine (Léa Seydoux) enters the service of her new employers, the Lanlaire family, which consists of a bitter wife and her perverted husband. Monsieur Lanlaire has a reputation for molesting and impregnating his chambermaids, while Madame Lanlaire is known for her domineering attitude over her servants and often fires her chambermaids. She also meets the other servants: Marianne, the overweight and homely cook, and the mysterious, older Joseph (Vincent Lindon), the groom, who shares a mutual attraction with Célestine.

Throughout the film, Célestine reflects on her past positions, such as a middle-aged woman with an elderly husband who was humiliated at a train customs stop after being forced to open a box revealing her dildo. Another significant post was her satisfying employment with the sickly young Georges and his kindly grandmother. Georges became infatuated with Célestine as she took care of him. After resisting his advances at first, Célestine had sex with him, only for him to succumb to his illness and die during the act, horrifying her. Numb from the experience, she left the position.

In the Lanlaire household, Célestine chafes under the demanding and often unreasonable Madame Lanlaire, who frequently derides Célestine for any delay or error and refuses to let her attend her mother's funeral. Monsieur Lanlaire quickly sets his sights on Célestine, who rebuffs his advances while secretly plotting to manipulate him. The neighbor, Captain Mauger (Patrick d'Assumçao), who has bequeathed his estate to the servant, Rose, after his wife left him for sleeping with Rose, is also interested in her. Célestine also plots to use Capt Mauger for her own ambitions, but Rose becomes jealous after Capt Mauger kills his obedient pet ferret named Kleber after a comment Célestine makes about the pet.

Célestine finds respite in gossip at the house of the village abortion provider and in commiserating with cook Marianne. In one conversation with Marianne, she learns that Marianne was attracted to one of her old masters but was kicked out after becoming pregnant by him and was forced to kill her baby; later, she reveals that she is having sex with Monsieur Lanlaire regularly and she must get an abortion done. One night, after talking with Marianne, Célestine hears agonized screams coming from the forest, which unsettles her.

The next day, she visits Joseph and learns that he is a rabid anti-Semite and propagates anti-Dreyfus propaganda on behalf of local priests. He dreams of owning a business where he can provide a rendezvous for militant right-wing nationalists and acknowledges that he needs a woman like Célestine to make his plan a success. Later, while gossiping with the other women, Célestine learns that a local prepubescent peasant girl was violently raped, disemboweled, and murdered, explaining the screams Célestine had heard at night. Célestine suspects that Joseph is the murderer, as he could be placed at the crime scene, but this only makes her more fascinated with him.

Rose dies, and Capt Mauger admits to Célestine that Rose disappointed him after getting a servant of her own and failed to keep up the chores she had when she was a servant. He had hoped to die before her, as he had secretly made a second will nullifying the first, ensuring that Rose would inherit nothing. Capt Mauger offers for Célestine to work for him in the same work and sexual arrangement that Rose had with him, but Célestine only promises to think about it, satisfied with her manipulation of him.

Ultimately, she professes her attraction to Joseph and begs to join him. After aggressive sexual intercourse with her, he has Célestine assist him in the theft of the Lanlaire's silverware that would fund his plan, a theft which is blamed on professional thieves. Upon discovering the burglary, Madame Lanlaire wonders aloud why their dogs did not bark at the burglars, so Joseph shoots both the dogs dead. Police start the probe into the burglary. The police asked Lanlaires whether they suspected anyone from the household, especially Joseph, but they gave him a clean sheet, saying that he had been with them for 15 years and was very devoted and trustworthy. The police have no clues, even after several weeks of investigation. The case is closed unsolved. Joseph quits his position later, and Célestine bides her time waiting for him, befriending Madame Lanlaire to get in her good graces before telling her she is engaged to be married and must soon quit. One night, she sees Joseph's signal through her window and joins him, ruminating that she has been out-manipulated, acknowledging that he is a devil but has her completely in his grasp. They leave for Cherbourg, and the carriage disappears into the darkness.

== Cast ==
- Léa Seydoux as Célestine
- Vincent Lindon as Joseph
- Clotilde Mollet as Madame Lanlaire
- Hervé Pierre as Monsieur Lanlaire
- Mélodie Valemberg as Marianne
- Patrick d'Assumçao as Captain Mauger
- Vincent Lacoste as Georges
- Joséphine Derenne as Madame Mendelssohn
- Dominique Reymond as the recruiter
- Rosette as Rose
- Adriana Asti as the madam
- Aurélia Petit as the mistress

== Production ==
=== Development ===
On 9 February 2013, it was announced Benoît Jacquot would direct a film based on the 1900 novel The Diary of a Chambermaid. Producer Kristina Larsen stated that "Jacquot's version will be the most faithful adaptation of Mirbeau's novel". In February 2013, Marion Cotillard was in talks to play the central character Célestine, but later dropped out of the film over scheduling conflicts with Macbeth. On 5 February 2014, director Benoît Jacquot confirmed in an interview Diary of a Chambermaid will begin shooting in the forthcoming summer, with Léa Seydoux and Vincent Lindon joining the cast of the film. On 10 April, Cineuropa reported that the Île-de-France Region's Support Fund for the Film and Audiovisual Technical Industry added €440,000 to the film's funding.

=== Filming ===
Principal photography commenced on 10 June 2014 and concluded on 30 July. Filming took place in northern France (the heritage railway Chemin de Fer de la Baie de Somme, Le Crotoy, and Berck) and also at locations in and around Paris.

== Release ==
On 14 January 2015, it was announced that Diary of a Chambermaid had been selected to be screened in competition at the 65th Berlin International Film Festival.

The film was released to cinemas on 1 April 2015 in France.

== Reception ==
Review aggregation website Rotten Tomatoes reported an approval rating of 65%, based on 34 reviews, with an average score of 5.99/10. At Metacritic, which assigns a normalized rating out of 100 to reviews from mainstream critics, the film received an average score of 56, based on 16 reviews, indicating "mixed or average reviews".

The A.V. Club's Ignatiy Vishnevetsky opined that the film "lacks a unifying principle, as though the director were too eager to address subtexts to bother with text," and concluded: "Nominally, Diary Of A Chambermaid is about the moral rot hiding below, but its most lasting impressions come from surface pleasures and barely motivated flourishes of style."

== Accolades ==
Award / Film Festival	Category	Recipients and nominees	Result
Berlin International Film Festival	Golden Bear		Nominated
César Awards	Best Adaptation	Benoît Jacquot and Hélène Zimmer	Nominated
César Awards	Best Costume Design	Anaïs Romand	Nominated
César Awards	Best Production Design	Katia Wyszkop	Nominated
Lumière Awards	Best Actor	Vincent Lindon	Won
Lumière Awards	Best Music	Bruno Coulais	Nominated
World Soundtrack Awards	Soundtrack Composer of the Year	Bruno Coulais	Nominated
