= Diary of a Chambermaid (1964 film) =

1964 Italian-French satirical drama film by Luis Buñuel

- Theatrical re-release poster
- French: Le journal d'une femme de chambre
- Directed by: Luis Buñuel
- Written by: Luis Buñuel; Jean-Claude Carrière
- Based on: The Diary of a Chambermaid by Octave Mirbeau
- Produced by: Serge Silberman; Michel Safra
- Starring: Jeanne Moreau; Georges Géret; Daniel Ivernel; Françoise Lugagne; Marguerite Muni; Jean Ozenne; Michel Piccoli
- Cinematography: Roger Fellous
- Edited by: Louisette Hautecoeur
- Production companies: Ciné-Alliance; Filmsonor; Spéva Films; Dear Film
- Distributed by: Cocinor
- Release dates: 4 March 1964 (France); 16 September 1964 (Italy)
- Running time: 97 minutes 85 minutes (alternate French version)
- Countries: France; Italy
- Languages: French; Italian
- Box office: $19,607

Diary of a Chambermaid (French: Le journal d'une femme de chambre, Italian: Il diario di una cameriera) is a 1964 Italian-French satirical drama film directed by Spanish filmmaker Luis Buñuel and starring Jeanne Moreau as a Parisian chambermaid who uses her body and wiles to navigate the perversion, corruption, and violence she encounters at the provincial estate where she goes to work. Though highly satirical and reflective of his typical anti-bourgeois sentiments, it is one of Buñuel's more realistic films, and generally avoids the outlandish surrealist imagery and far-fetched plot twists found in many of his other works. The film was the first screenwriting collaboration between Buñuel and Jean-Claude Carrière, who extensively reworked the 1900 novel of the same name by Octave Mirbeau. Buñuel and Carrière would go on to collaborate on Belle de Jour (1967), The Milky Way (1969), The Discreet Charm of the Bourgeoisie (1972), The Phantom of Liberty (1974) and That Obscure Object of Desire (1977).

== Plot ==
In France in the late 1920s, Célestine, a stylish and attractive young chambermaid from Paris, arrives at a provincial estate and joins a household staff that includes a cook, a timid maid named Marianne, and Joseph, the groom, who spends his evenings writing nationalistic, anti-Semitic leaflets with a friend. Célestine was primarily hired to work for the elderly Monsieur Rabour, who insists on calling her Marie, which is the name he has used for all of his chambermaids, and likes to touch her leg while she reads to him and watch as she walks around wearing certain shoes. She seems happy enough to oblige him, however, and he defends Célestine from his daughter, Madame Monteil, when she breaks a lamp.

Madame Monteil runs the household and is very particular about how things are done. She and her husband are not physically intimate due to her dyspareunia, a problem with which the local priest has not been helpful, and Monsieur Monteil copes by expending his energy hunting small game in the surrounding woods and pursuing any woman who is nearby, including the former chambermaid, though Célestine playfully manages to keep him at arm's length. Monsieur Monteil is also feuding with a neighbor, the retired Captain Mauger, who throws his garbage onto Rabour's property to get back at Monteil for hypocritically spreading rumors about his relationship with his own housekeeper, Rose.

One day, Rabour is found dead in his bed, clutching the pair of boots he had most recently had Célestine wear for him. At around the same time, Joseph comes across Claire, a prepubescent peasant girl who often hangs around the kitchen at the estate, alone in the woods and rapes and kills her. The body is found six days later, shortly before Célestine is to board a train back to Paris, having quit her job. She immediately suspects Joseph is the murderer and, as she had grown close to Claire, decides to get her job back and try to collect evidence to implicate him.

Joseph, a fastidious man, notices when Célestine searches his room. He confronts her and, although their interactions have always been confrontational and she openly accuses him of killing Claire, proceeds to declare his love for Célestine, as he has come to feel they are the same inside. Célestine tries to seduce Joseph, but he says they need to wait, since he wants more than a fling.

After leaving the office of a judge without seeing him, Célestine runs into Mauger. He tells her that he fired Rose, saying she had stopped doing housework and become controlling after 12 years in his employ and also would get jealous whenever he talked to Célestine. Mauger then proposes, and Célestine tells him that she will think it over.

To tempt Joseph, Célestine waits for him in his bed, but he again resists. He says he plans to marry her and buy a café in Cherbourg for them to run together, indicating he suspects an upcoming revolution will be good for business. She swears on a crucifix that she will marry him so he will sleep with her, and, as he climbs into bed, she tells him to admit he killed Claire, but he just tells her to shut up. Joseph and Célestine announce their engagement, and Monsieur Monteil shifts his attentions from Célestine to Marianne.

Célestine removes the metal toe plate from one of Joseph's shoes. While Joseph and his friend are making plans to attend a right-wing political rally, two police officers arrive and arrest the pair, having found the toe plate at the scene of Claire's murder. As he is being led away, Joseph tells Célestine he was not wearing those shoes the day Claire was killed.

Thinking she has avenged Claire, Célestine decides to marry Mauger. He waits on her and alters his will to leave her everything, but she treats him coolly. When she asks about Joseph, Mauger says he is to be released without a trial, given the lack of evidence against him.

In Cherbourg, Joseph cheers on a parade of nationalistic men as they march past his café, which his attractive younger wife has helped to fill with soldiers.

== Cast ==
- Jeanne Moreau as Célestine
- Georges Géret as Joseph, Rabour's groom
- Daniel Ivernel as Captain Mauger, Rabour's neighbor
- Françoise Lugagne as Madame Monteil, Rabour's daughter
- Muni as Marianne, Rabour's maid
- Jean Ozenne as Monsieur Rabour
- Michel Piccoli as Monsieur Monteil, Rabour's son-in-law
- Joëlle Bernard as Joseph's wife
- Françoise Bertin as gossip girl
- Aline Bertrand as a traveler who hears about Claire's death
- Pierre Collet as a traveler who hears about Claire's death
- Michel Dacquin (credited as Michel Dacquid) as a wedding guest
- Madeleine Damien as Rabour's cook
- Marc Eyraud as the judge's secretary
- Jean Franval as the gossiping postman
- Gilberte Géniat as Rose, Mauger's housekeeper
- Gabriel Gobin as the senior policeman who arrests Joseph
- Bernard Musson as the sacristan, Joseph's friend
- Jeanne Pérez (credited as Jeanne Péres) as a gossip
- Marcel Rouzé as the station master
- Dominique Sauvage as "little" Claire
- Andrée Tainsy (credited as Andrée Taincy) as a gossip
- Geymond Vital as the senior policeman at the train station
- Jean-Claude Carrière as the priest
- Claude Jaeger as the judge
- Dominique Zardi as the junior policeman (uncredited)

== Production ==
The film was originally intended as a vehicle for the Mexican actress Silvia Pinal, who had starred in Buñuel's earlier films Viridiana (1961) and The Exterminating Angel (1962). Pinal learned French and was willing to work for free, but the French producers of Diary of a Chambermaid cast Jeanne Moreau instead.

Shooting on the film began on 21 October 1963. The final scene, in which marching rightists shout "Vive Chiappe", references the Paris police chief who stopped Buñuel's 1930 film L'Âge d'Or from being exhibited after the theater in which it was being shown was destroyed by Fascists.

== Release ==
In 1964, the film was screened at the Venice Film Festival and the New York Film Festival. It was first released on home video in the U.S. on 22 March 1989, and was re-released in theaters in the U.S. in 2000, beginning with the screening of a new 35-mm print at the Film Forum in New York City on 22 September.

In 2001, Diary of a Chambermaid was released on DVD by The Criterion Collection.

Kino Lorber released the film on Blu-ray on March 25, 2025.

== Reception ==
On review aggregator Rotten Tomatoes, the film has an 88% rating and an average rating 7.9/10 based on 24 reviews.

Eugene Archer of The New York Times wrote "Sadly, the intervening decades seem to have weakened Mr. Bunuel's powers. His new adaptation of Octave Mirbeau's Diary of a Chambermaid suffers in comparison with the strange but memorable version Jean Renoir did with Paulette Goddard in 1946."

== See also ==
- The Diary of a Chambermaid, an English-language film from 1946 directed by Jean Renoir
- Diary of a Chambermaid, a French-language film from 2015 directed by Benoît Jacquot
