= Conference of the Birds (disambiguation) =

The Conference of the Birds is a 12th-century classic of Persian poetry written by Farid ud-Din Attar.

Conference of the Birds may also refer to:

- Conference of the Birds: The Story of Peter Brook in Africa (1977), John Heilpern's nonfiction account of the African tour of Peter Brook and his experimental theatre company
- Conference of the Birds (Dave Holland album) (1972)
- Conference of the Birds (Om album) (2006)
- Conference of the Birds (play), a music theatre play
- The Conference of the Birds (novel), the fifth novel of Miss Peregrine's peculiar children, by Ransom Riggs (2020)
