= The Power of Buddhism =

1996 book by the Dalai Lama and Jean-Claude Carrière

- Author: Tenzin Gyatso; Jean-Claude Carrière
- Genre: Religion
- Publication date: 1999
- ISBN: 978-0717128037

The Power of Buddhism is a 1999 book written by Tenzin Gyatso, 14th Dalai Lama and Jean-Claude Carrière, published 1 January 1996 (ISBN 978-0717128037).

The book was an initiative of Laurent Laffont. To prepare for it, screenwriter Jean-Claude Carrière had the help of the Tibet Bureau and the sinologist Nahal Tajadod, who accompanied him to India, to meet the Dalai Lama. They arrived on February 10, 1994, in Dharamsala, in the north of India, where he lives, so that they could attend the Tibetan New Year.

The understanding between Carrière and the Dalai Lama was excellent from the outset. They discussed in the book major problems of our time, including overpopulation, the degradation of the planet, violence, education, but also metaphysical questions such as death and reincarnation. The Dalai Lama explained his vision of the world, his confidence in man, his detachment from dogmas and his thought in perpetual research. He described the potential role of Buddhism in the world.
