= Jean-Claude Carrière =

French writer (1931–2021)

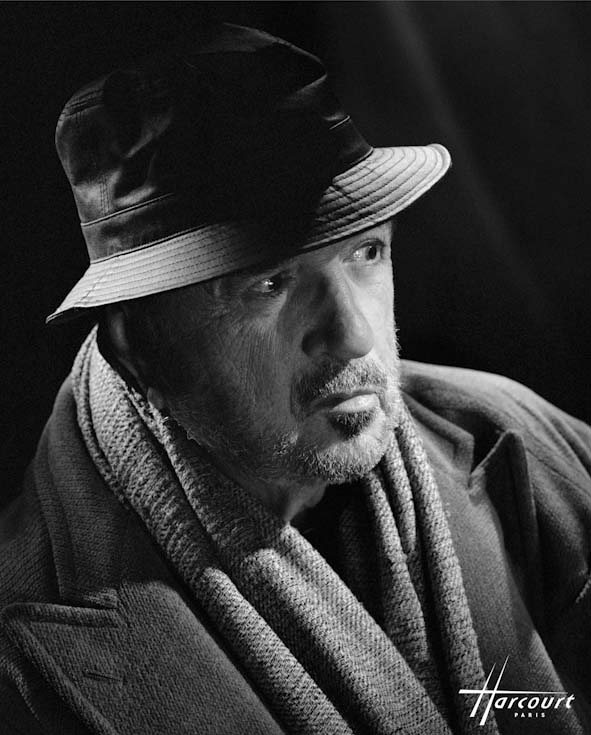
- Born: 17 September 1931; Colombières-sur-Orb, France
- Died: 8 February 2021 (aged 89); Paris, France
- Occupations: Novelist, screenwriter, actor, director
- Years active: 1957–2021
- Spouse(s): Hanna Schygulla (1982–1995); Nahal Tajadod

Jean-Claude Carrière (French: [ka.ʁjɛʁ]; 17 September 1931 – 8 February 2021) was a French novelist, screenwriter and actor. He received an Academy Award for best short film for co-writing Heureux Anniversaire (1963), and was later given an Honorary Oscar in 2014. He was nominated for the Academy Award three other times for his work in The Discreet Charm of the Bourgeoisie (1972), That Obscure Object of Desire (1977), and The Unbearable Lightness of Being (1988). He also won a César Award for Best Original Screenplay in The Return of Martin Guerre (1983).

Carrière was an alumnus of the École normale supérieure de Saint-Cloud and was president of La Fémis, the French state film school that he helped establish. He was noted as a frequent collaborator with Luis Buñuel on the screenplays of the latter's late French films.

== Early life ==
Carrière was born in Colombières-sur-Orb in southwestern France on 17 September 1931. His family worked as vintners, and his parents subsequently moved to Montreuil, in the suburbs of Paris, in 1945 to start a coffeehouse. Carrière was a gifted student, and attended Lycée Lakanal before studying literature and history at the École normale supérieure de Saint-Cloud, a grande école. He went on to publish his first novel, Lézard, in 1957 at the age of 26. Consequently, he was introduced to Jacques Tati, who employed Carrière to write novels based on his movies.

== Career ==
Carrière met Pierre Étaix, who worked as Tati's first assistant. Carrière and Étaix went on to write and direct several films, including Heureux Anniversaire (1962). That film ultimately won the 1963 Academy Award for Best Short Subject (Live Action). That same year, Carrière's nineteen-year collaboration with Luis Buñuel began with the film Diary of a Chambermaid (1964). He co-wrote the screenplay with Buñuel and also played the part of a village priest. They subsequently collaborated on the scripts of nearly all Buñuel's later films, including Belle de Jour (1967), The Milky Way (1969), and The Phantom of Liberty (1974). Their teamwork in writing The Discreet Charm of the Bourgeoisie (1972) was nominated for the Academy Award for Best Original Screenplay, and the film ultimately won the Best Foreign Language Film. They earned their second Oscar nomination five years later for Best Adapted Screenplay in That Obscure Object of Desire (1977).

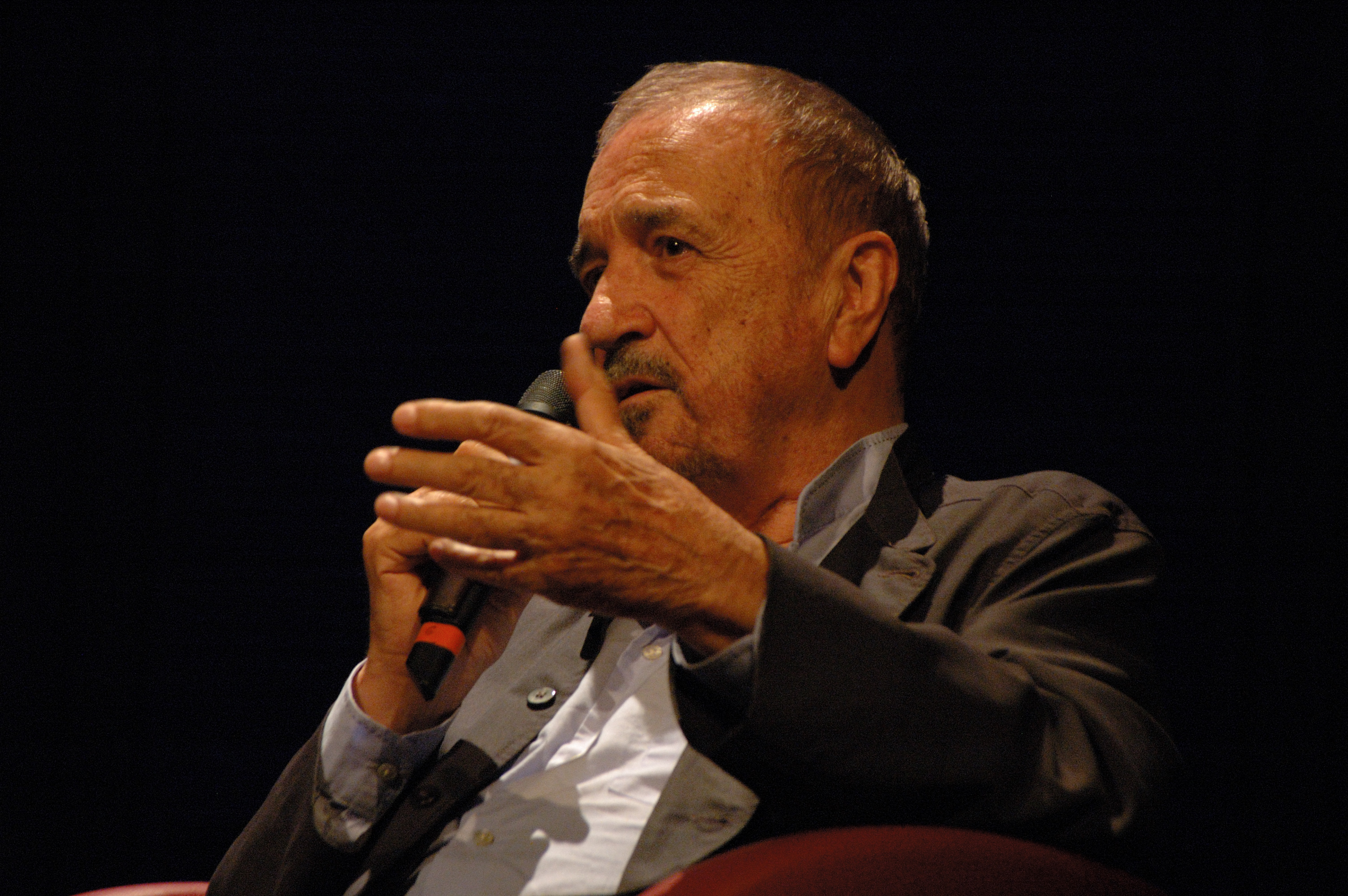
Carrière in 2008

Carrière also penned the screenplay for The Tin Drum (1979), which won both the Palme d'Or at the 1979 Cannes Film Festival and Best Foreign Language Film at the Oscars a year later. His work on The Return of Martin Guerre (1983) won the 1983 César Award for Best Original Screenplay. He received his third Academy Award nomination six years later for writing the script of The Unbearable Lightness of Being (1988) with Philip Kaufman.

Carrière co-founded La Fémis, the French state film school, in 1986. He taught screenwriting there, and served as its president for ten years. He collaborated with Peter Brook on a nine hour long stage version of the ancient Sanskrit epic The Mahabharata, and a five-hour film version. He also provided the libretto for Hans Gefors' fifth opera Clara, which was premiered at the Opéra-Comique in Paris in 1998. He was credited as a script consultant in The White Ribbon, which won the Palme d'Or in 2009.

== Later life and death ==
Carrière and Umberto Eco published This Is Not the End of the Book in 2012, a book of conversations on the future of information carriers. Carrière also wrote comics for Bernard Yslaire and Pierre Étaix. He was given an Academy Honorary Award in 2014, for his lifetime work in writing approximately 80 screenplays, as well as his essays, fiction, translations and interviews.

Carrière died in his sleep on 8 February 2021 at his home in Paris of natural causes.

== Awards and honors ==
- Academy Award for Best Live Action Short Film (1963) for Heureux Anniversaire, shared with Pierre Étaix
- Academy Honorary Award (2014) for lifetime achievement (at Governors Awards)
- Laurel Award for Screenwriting Achievement (2000)
- Padma Shri, the fourth highest civilian award of India (2015)
- Asteroid 347266 Carrière, discovered by amateur astronomer Bernard Christophe at Saint-Sulpice Observatory in 2004, was named in his memory. The naming was announced by the International Astronomical Union on 16 June 2021.

== Filmography ==
=== Writer ===
- The Suitor (1962)
- Rupture (1962, Short)
- Heureux Anniversaire (1962, Short)
- The Adventures of Robinson Crusoe (1964, TV Series)
- La reine verte (1964, TV Movie)
- Diary of a Chambermaid (1964)
- Yo Yo (1965)
- Viva Maria! (1965)
- The Diabolical Dr. Z (1965) aka Miss Muerte
- Tant qu'on a la santé (1966)
- Attack of the Robots (1966) aka Cartes sur Table
- Hotel Paradiso (1966)
- The Thief of Paris (1967)
- Belle de Jour (1967)
- Pour un amour lointain (1968)
- The Great Love (1969)
- The Milky Way (1969)
- La Piscine (1969)
- La pince à ongles (1969, Short, also director)
- Borsalino (1970)
- The Wedding Ring (1970)
- Un peu de soleil dans l'eau froide (1971)
- Taking Off (1971)
- The Outside Man (1972)
- The Discreet Charm of the Bourgeoisie (1972)
- Liza (1972)
- Le Moine (1972)
- France, Inc. (1973)
- The Phantom of Liberty (1974)
- Serious as Pleasure (1975)
- La Chair de l'orchidée (1975)
- That Obscure Object of Desire (1977)
- Le gang (1977)
- Le Diable dans la boîte (1977)
- Julie pot de colle (1977)
- Butterfly on the Shoulder (1978)
- The Tin Drum (1979)
- Return to the Beloved (1979)
- The Associate (1979)
- Sauve qui peut (la vie) (1980)
- The Return of Martin Guerre (1982)
- Passion (1982)
- The General of the Dead Army (1983)
- La Tragédie de Carmen (1983)
- Danton (1983)
- Credo (1983, TV Movie)
- Un amour de Swann (1984)
- Max mon amour (1986)
- Les Exploits d'un jeune Don Juan (1987)
- The Unbearable Lightness of Being (1988)
- The Possessed (1988)
- The Bengali Night (1988)
- Valmont (1989)
- Hard to Be a God (1989)
- The Mahabharata (1989)
- Bouvard et Pécuchet (1989)
- May Fools (1990)
- Cyrano de Bergerac (1990)
- At Play in the Fields of the Lord (1991)
- The Return of Casanova (1992)
- La Controverse de Valladolid (1992, TV Movie)
- C'était la guerre (1993, TV Movie)
- Priez pour nous (1994)
- The Night and the Moment (1995)
- The Horseman on the Roof (1995)
- La duchesse de Langeais (1995, TV Movie)
- Associations de bienfaiteurs (1995)
- The Ogre (1996)
- The Associate (1996)
- Le parfum de Jeannette (1996, TV Movie)
- Golden Boy (1996)
- Chinese Box (1997)
- Clarissa (1998, TV Movie)
- La Guerre dans le Haut Pays (1999)
- Salsa (2000)
- Madame De... (2001)
- Letter from an Unknown Woman (2001, TV Movie)
- La Bataille d'Hernani (2002, TV Movie)
- Ruy Blas (2002, TV Movie)
- Rien, voilà l'ordre (2003)
- Les Thibault (2003, TV mini series)
- Father Goriot (2004)
- Birth (2004)
- Galilée ou L'amour de Dieu (2005, TV Movie)
- Goya's Ghosts (2006)
- Ulzhan (2007)
- The 4th Wall (2010), based on his play L'Aide-Mémoire (1968)
- Memories of My Melancholy Whores (2011)
- The Artist and the Model (2012)
- In the Shadow of Women (2015)
- Lover for a Day (2017)
- A Faithful Man (2018)
- At Eternity's Gate (2018)
- Le sel des larmes (2019)
- The Crusade (2021)
- Land of Dreams (2021)

=== Actor ===
- Diary of a Chambermaid (1964) – Le curé
- The Milky Way (1969) – Priscillian
- Alliance (1969) – Hugues
- Un peu de soleil dans l'eau froide (1971) – François, le mari de Nathalie
- Serious as Pleasure (1975) – Le chef d'étage (uncredited)
- Le jeu du solitaire (1976) – Luc
- Le jardin des supplices (1976) – Le commandant du navire
- Surprise Sock (1978) – Fournier
- Ils sont grands, ces petits (1979) – Le psychiatre (uncredited)
- Die Blechtrommel (1979) – Grigori Rasputin (extended cut, uncredited)
- L'amour nu (1981) – Le professeur
- Vive les femmes! (1984) – Le sourd-muet
- The Night and the Moment (1994) – The Governor
- Jaya Ganga (1996) – Professor
- Buñuel y la mesa del rey Salomón (2001) – David Goldman
- Paris Brothel (2003) - self
- Avida (2006) – Le riche paranoîaque
- Tajnata kniga (2006) – Pierre Reymond
- Certified Copy (2010) – L'homme de la place
- La fameuse invasion des ours en Sicile (2019) – Vieil Ours (voice)

== See also ==
- Conference of the Birds (play)
