= Françoise Lugagne =

French actress

- Born: 10 August 1914; Marseille, Bouches-du-Rhône, France
- Died: 5 May 1991 (aged 76); Puéchabon, Hérault, France
- Occupation: Actress
- Years active: 1945–1983 (film & TV)

Françoise Lugagne (French pronunciation: [fʁɑ̃swaz lyɡaɲ]; 1914–1991) was a French stage, film and television actress. She was married to the Belgian actor Raymond Rouleau and appeared alongside him in the 1945 fashion house drama Paris Frills as his spurned love interest.

== Filmography ==
Year	Title	Role	Notes
1945	Paris Frills	Anne-Marie	
1950	Beware of Blondes	Janine Lambert	
1957	The Crucible	Jane Putnam	
1963	Landru	Catherine Landru	
1964	Diary of a Chambermaid	Mme Monteil	
1970	Tropic of Cancer	Iréne	
1971	Les stances à Sophie	Mme Aignan	
1971	Le Prussien	Lucie	TV movie
1974	Plaies et bosses	Norah	TV movie
1976	Monsieur Albert	Peggy	
1978	Dossier 51	Madame Auphal	
1983	The Little Bunch	La vieille dame	(final film role)

== Bibliography ==
- Philippe Rège. Encyclopedia of French Film Directors, Volume 1. Scarecrow Press, 2009.
