= Nahal Tajadod =

Iranian writer

- نهال تجدد
- Born: 1960 (age 65–66)
- Occupation: writer
- Spouse: Jean-Claude Carrière
- Parents: Reza Tajadod (father); Mahin Jahanbeglou (mother)

Nahal Tajadod is an Iranian writer and scholar living in Paris. Tajadod was married to Jean-Claude Carrière until his death. She received the Grande médaille de la francophonie in 2007 from the Académie Française.

== Life ==
Her father, Reza Tajadod, of the Haeri Mazandarani family was an Iranian writer and her mother, Mahin Jahanbeglou, was one of the pioneers of play-writing in Iran. In the 1970s, Nahal Tajadod went to France to study Chinese culture and literature. She studied under people like François Cheng, an expert in Chinese poetry, calligraphy and painting.
