= Plaies et bosses =

1974 film

- Directed by: Yves-André Hubert
- Starring: Paul Barge; Isabelle Huppert
- Country of origin: France
- Original language: French

Original release
- Release: 9 August 1974

Plaies et bosses is a 1974 French film directed by Yves-André Hubert.

== Cast ==
- Paul Barge - Egan
- Isabelle Huppert - Patsy Lackan
- Françoise Lugagne - Norah
- Marc Eyraud - Dooling
- Gilette Barbier - Maeve Lackan
- Thierry Murzeau - Sean Lackan
- Jean-Pierre Mathieux - Kevin Lackan
- Martine Chevallier - Kale Lackan (as Martine Chevalier)
- Julien Verdier - O'Neill
- Georges Staquet - Coopen
- Fanny Robiane - Miss O'Brien
- Jean Rupert - Lennox
- Yves Peneau - Brian Caher
- Sacha Tarride - Le vieux malade
- Gérald Denizeau - Egoin Conglarre
- Jacqueline Johel - Miss Conglarre
- Olivier Hémon - Lisgoold
- Robert Le Béal - O'Hagan
- Andrée Champeaux - Maud Barnett
- Vernon Dobtcheff - Le père O'Donoghue

== See also ==
- Isabelle Huppert on screen and stage
