= Muni (actress) =

French actress

- Born: 23 June 1929; French Madagascar
- Died: 22 August 1999 (aged 70); Garches (near Paris), France
- Occupation: Actress

Muni (born Marguerite Muni; 23 June 1929 – 22 August 1999) was a French actress who is best known for her appearances in the late French films of the movie director Luis Buñuel. Though she is most often recognized by her last name, generally used in opening credits, she was occasionally listed under her full name. She is known for playing highly idiosyncratic characters, usually in supporting roles, in most of her films.

== Selected filmography ==
- Cage of Girls (1949)
- Diary of a Chambermaid (1964)
- Belle de Jour (1967)
- The Young Wolves (1968)
- The Milky Way (1969)
- Promise at Dawn (1970)
- The Discreet Charm of the Bourgeoisie (1972)
- The Phantom of Liberty (1974)
- That Obscure Object of Desire (1977)
