= Marc Eyraud =

French actor

- Born: 1 March 1924; Saint-Étienne, France
- Died: 15 February 2005 (aged 80); Banyuls-sur-Mer, France
- Occupation: Actor
- Years active: 1956–1995

Marc Eyraud (1 March 1924 – 15 February 2005) was a French film actor. He appeared in 60 films between 1956 and 1995.

== Partial filmography ==
- Plucking the Daisy (1956) - Un photographe (uncredited)
- The Man in the Raincoat (1957) - Petit rôle (uncredited)
- Les Misérables (1958) - Grantaire
- Taxi, Roulotte et Corrida (1958) - Le douanier espagnol
- Le mouton (1960) - Le passant qui demande du feu (uncredited)
- Le coeur battant (1960) - Le directeur de la galerie
- Léon Morin, Priest (1961) - Anton
- Par-dessus le mur (1961) - Un père
- The Immoral Moment (1962) - Le metteur en scène
- Ballade pour un voyou (1963) - Le radiologue
- La belle vie (1963) - Le photographe (uncredited)
- Diary of a Chambermaid (1964) - Le secrétaire du commissaire
- A Taste for Women (1964) - Rocard
- Le Bonheur (1965) - J. Forestier - le frère de François
- The Wise Guys (1965) - L'éducateur
- Beatrice (1965) - Giacomo
- The Nun (1966) - Le père Seraphin
- The Gardener of Argenteuil (1966) - Le voisin de Martin (uncredited)
- Belle de Jour (1967) - Barman (uncredited)
- Lamiel (1967) - Monsieur Hautemare
- Lettre à Carla (1967) - Giacomo
- Les patates (1969) - Maurice
- The Confession (1970) - Un politique
- Elise, or Real Life (1970) - Un raciste au café (uncredited)
- L'araignée d'eau (1970) - Bernard
- Traîté du rossignol (1971) - Le cycliste
- It Only Happens to Others (1971)
- Boulevard du Rhum (1971) - Le toubib
- Un peu de soleil dans l'eau froide (1971) - Monsieur Rouargue
- La Scoumoune (1972) - Bonne Aventure - un prisonnier
- Défense de savoir (1973) - Le témoin
- Vogue la galère (1973, TV Movie) - Le défroqué
- Plaies et bosses (1974, TV Movie) - Dooling
- Borsalino & Co. (1974) - Le médecin-chef de l'asile (uncredited)
- Aloïse (1975) - Le père d'Aloïse
- The Gypsy (1975) - Le médecin
- Un sac de billes (1975) - Le curé du train
- Les oeufs brouillés (1976)
- Boomerang (1976) - Andreï (uncredited)
- Coup de Grâce (1976) - Dr. Paul Rugen
- Moi, Pierre Rivière, ayant égorgé ma mère, ma sœur et mon frère... (1976) - Le curé Suriray
- Le Gang (1977) - Le prêtre
- The Simple Past (1977) - Le docteur Mercier
- La Menace (1977) - Examining Magistrate Baron
- The Little Wheedlers (1978) - Le libraire
- Perceval le Gallois (1978) - Le Roi Arthur
- La gueule du loup (1981) - Le garagiste
- A Thousand Billion Dollars (1982) - Sylvestre
- La sonate des spectres (2015) - Un pensionnaire de la maison de retraite
