= Lamiel =

1967 film

- Film poster
- Directed by: Jean Aurel
- Written by: Jean Aurel; Cécil Saint-Laurent; Stendhal
- Produced by: Georges de Beauregard
- Starring: Anna Karina; Michel Bouquet; Jean-Claude Brialy
- Cinematography: Alain Levent
- Edited by: Françoise Collin
- Production companies: Compagnia Cinematografica Champion; Les Films Copernic; Rome Paris Films
- Distributed by: Warner Bros. (France)
- Release date: 30 August 1967
- Running time: 95 minutes
- Country: France
- Language: French

Lamiel is a 1967 French historical drama film. It was directed by Jean Aurel and stars Anna Karina, Michel Bouquet, and Jean-Claude Brialy.

The film is based on Stendhal's unfinished last novel, Lamiel. A costume drama set in the 19th century, it centers on the young orphan Lamiel (Karina) as she rises from poverty into high society under the guidance of a doctor (Bouquet), who lives vicariously through her. She eventually marries a bankrupt comte (Brialy), but falls for a thief who breaks into her bedroom one night.

== Cast ==
- Anna Karina as Lamiel
- Michel Bouquet as Le docteur Sansins
- Denise Gence as La duchesse de Miossens
- Marc Eyraud as M. Hautemare
- Denise Péron as Mme. Hautemare
- Pierre Clémenti as Fedor
- Jean-Claude Brialy as Le comte d'Aubigné
- Claude Dauphin as Le marquis d'Orpiez
- Robert Hossein as Valber
- Bernadette Lafont as Pauline
- Jean-Pierre Moulin as Le facteur
- Alice Sapritch as Mme Legrand
- Christian Barbier as Vidocq
