= Heureux Anniversaire =

1962 film

- Directed by: Pierre Étaix
- Written by: Pierre Étaix
- Produced by: Jean-Claude Carrière; Pierre Étaix
- Starring: Robert Blome; Pierre Étaix
- Cinematography: Pierre Levent
- Release date: 1962
- Running time: 12 minutes
- Country: France
- Language: French

Heureux Anniversaire (also known as Happy Anniversary) is a 1962 French short comedy film directed by Pierre Étaix. It won an Oscar in 1963 for Best Short Subject.

== Cast ==
- Robert Blome
- Pierre Étaix
- Lucien Frégis
- Laurence Lignières
- Georges Loriot
- Ican Paillaud
- Nono Zammit
