= National Board of Review Awards 1946 =

Annual US film awards ceremony

18th National Board of Review Awards

December 18, 1946

The 18th National Board of Review Awards were announced on 18 December 1946.

== Best English-language films ==
1. Henry V
2. Open City
3. The Best Years of Our Lives
4. Brief Encounter
5. A Walk in the Sun
6. It Happened at the Inn
7. My Darling Clementine
8. The Diary of a Chambermaid
9. The Killers
10. Anna and the King of Siam

== Winners ==
- Best Film: Henry V
- Best Actor: Laurence Olivier (Henry V)
- Best Actress: Anna Magnani (Open City)
- Best Director: William Wyler (The Best Years of Our Lives)
