= Colombières-sur-Orb =

- Commune
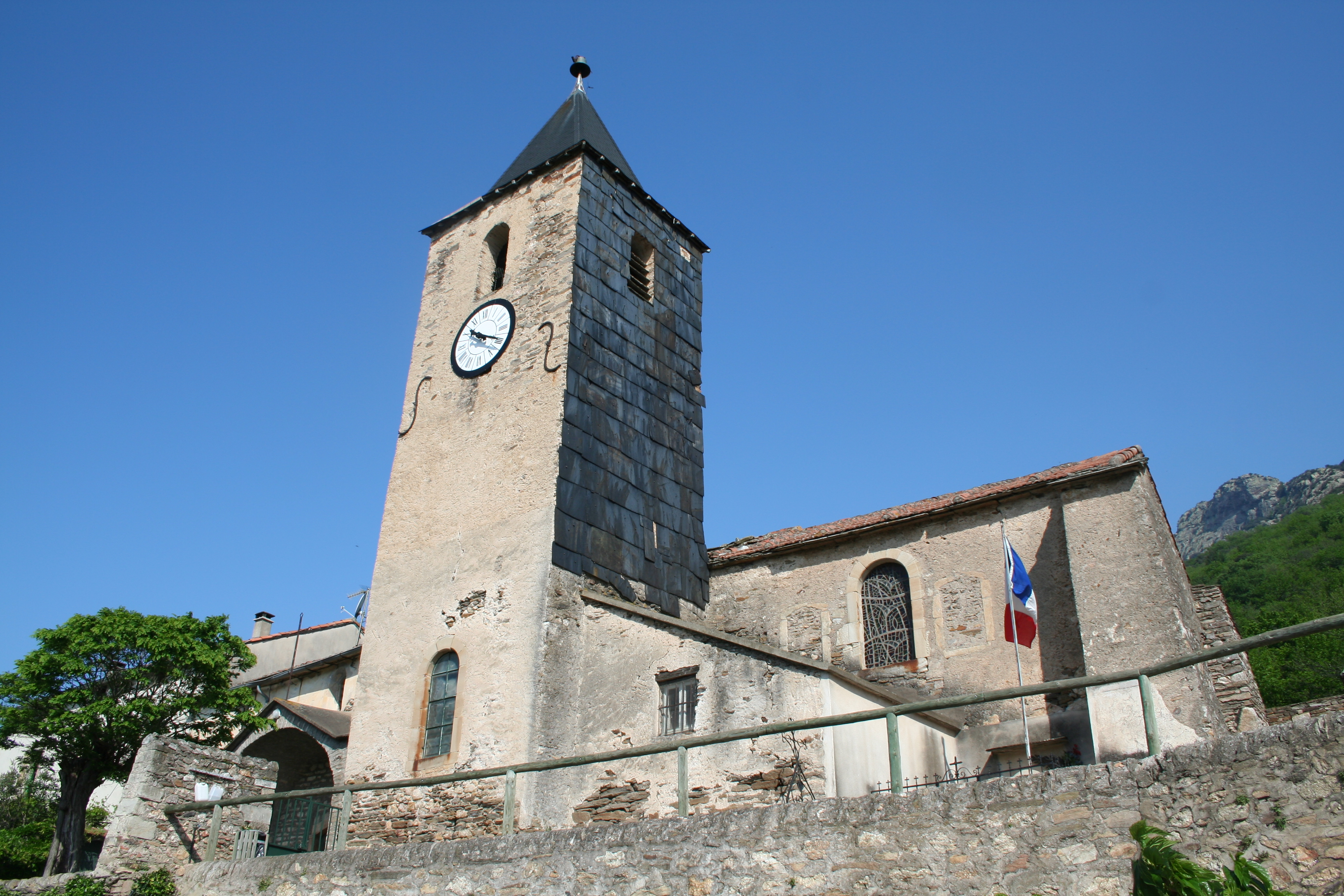
- Saint-Pierre Church

- Coat of arms
- Location of Colombières-sur-Orb
- Location within France Location within Occitanie
- Coordinates: 43°34′52″N 3°00′38″E
- Country: France
- Region: Occitania
- Department: Hérault
- Arrondissement: Béziers
- Canton: Saint-Pons-de-Thomières
- Intercommunality: CC du Minervois au Caroux

Government
  - Mayor (2020–2026): Thérèse Salavin
- Area^{1}: 8.11 km^{2} (3.13 sq mi)
- Highest elevation: 1,008 m (3,307 ft)
- Lowest elevation: 132 m (433 ft)
- Population (2023): 498
  - Density: 61.4/km^{2} (159/sq mi)
- Time zone: UTC+01:00 (CET)
  - Summer (DST): UTC+02:00 (CEST)
- INSEE/Postal code: 34080 /34390
- ^{1} French Land Register data, which excludes lakes, ponds, glaciers > 1 km^{2} (0.386 sq mi or 247 acres) and river estuaries.

Colombières-sur-Orb (French pronunciation: [kɔlɔ̃bjɛʁ syʁ ɔʁb], literally Colombières on Orb; Occitan: Colombièiras d'Òrb) is a commune in the Hérault department in southern France.

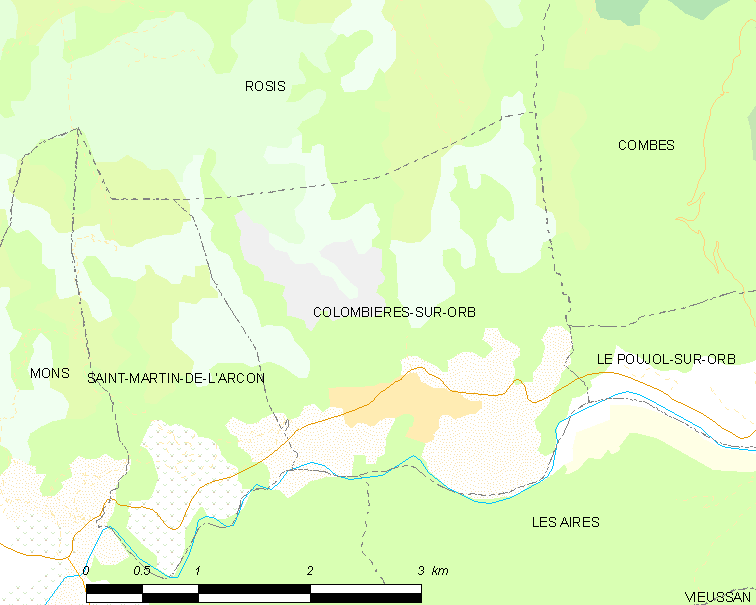
Map

The communal territory is home to a castle and the Gorges de Colombières, part of the Haut-Languedoc Regional Park, which includes prehistoric traces of troglodytes.

== Population ==
Historical population
Year	Pop.	±% p.a.
1968	266	—
1975	270	+0.21%
1982	339	+3.30%
1990	397	+1.99%
1999	417	+0.55%
2007	448	+0.90%
2012	471	+1.01%
2017	479	+0.34%
2023	498	+0.65%
Source: INSEE

== See also ==
- Communes of the Hérault department
