= The Milky Way (1969 film) =

- French theatrical release poster
- French: La Voie lactée
- Directed by: Luis Buñuel
- Written by: Luis Buñuel; Jean-Claude Carrière
- Produced by: Serge Silberman
- Starring: Paul Frankeur; Laurent Terzieff; Denis Manuel; Daniel Pilon
- Cinematography: Christian Matras
- Edited by: Louisette Hautecoeur
- Music by: Luis Buñuel
- Distributed by: Medusa Distribuzione (Italy); CCFC (France)
- Release dates: 28 February 1969 (Italy); 15 March 1969 (France); 6 July 1969 (West Germany)
- Running time: 91 minutes (France); 101 minutes (Germany); 105 minutes (USA)
- Countries: France; Italy; West Germany
- Language: French

The Milky Way (French: La Voie lactée) is a 1969 surrealist comedy-drama film directed by Luis Buñuel. It stars Paul Frankeur, Laurent Terzieff, Denis Manuel, and Daniel Pilon, with Alain Cuny, Michel Piccoli, and Delphine Seyrig in supporting roles. Buñuel later called The Milky Way the first in a trilogy about "the search for truth", along with his subsequent films The Discreet Charm of the Bourgeoisie and The Phantom of Liberty.

The title of the film is taken from a popular name used for the Camino de Santiago, a network of pilgrimage routes that stretched from northern Europe to Santiago de Compostela in Galicia, Spain, where the remains of St. James were reputed to be buried. The film follows the picaresque journey of two vagabond travelers (Frankeur and Terzieff), who seem to be making the pilgrimage as a means of escape. Along the way, they witness a series of bizarre incidents involving historical Christian heresies. At key moments, they encounter Jesus and the Virgin Mary, as well as modern believers and fanatics.

The nonlinear plot functions as a highly symbolic travelogue across time and space, encompassing much of Christian history. While using satire to critique religion from a skeptical perspective, the film also explores the act of spiritual quest and search for meaning.

The film originally met with limited success, but has come to be well-regarded amongst film enthusiasts and critics.

== Plot ==
Two French vagrants, Pierre and Jean, decide to take the pilgrimage route from Paris to Santiago de Compostela along the traditional Way of St. James. As they walk along a roadside near Fontainebleau, they encounter a caped clergyman who tells them to sleep with a prostitute and have children with her as in the Biblical account of Hosea and Gomer. The pilgrims reach an inn, where they find a police sergeant, a priest, and the cook debating the nature of the Eucharist and transubstantiation. The priest is taken away by staff from a nearby mental hospital. Later, the pilgrims find shelter for the night on a farm, while a secret Priscillianist sect meets nearby and conducts a sexual rite.

The pilgrims unsuccessfully seek food at an expensive restaurant, where the manager is explaining to his staff the controversy of the divinity of Jesus as debated during the First Council of Nicaea. Later, the pilgrims visit a boarding school in Tours and watch the children perform for their parents and teachers. As a class of young girls recites heresies and proclaim them "anathema", one of the pilgrims imagines a band of anarchists executing the Pope.

Near Bayonne, the pilgrims attempt to hitch-hike. One of them curses a car that did not stop to pick them up; it crashes and the driver is killed. Investigating the wreckage, they encounter a strange man (perhaps the Angel of Death or the Devil) who gives one of the pilgrims the dead man's shoes. At a chapel along the way, the pilgrims encounter a group of Jansenist convulsionnaire nuns who are nailing one of their group to a cross. Outside, a Jesuit and a Jansenist duel with swords while arguing over the doctrines of predestination and irresistible grace.

When the pilgrims reach Spain, they agree to take care of a donkey for two other men. These new men leave the pilgrims and travel to a nearby abbey, where they watch the official desecration of a priest's grave because of the posthumous discovery of his heretical writings regarding the nature of the Trinity. The two men proclaim loudly that the Godhead is one person and escape. In the forest, they switch clothes with two hunters swimming in a lake and shoot at a rosary discovered in one of their pockets with the hunters' shotguns. Later that night, a vision of the Virgin Mary appears to the pair and returns the rosary. The two men and the original pilgrims meet again at an inn, where they tell a local priest about their recent miraculous vision. The priest recounts another miracle, in which the Virgin Mary took on the form and performed the duties of an errant nun for several years until the nun returned to her convent and was welcomed as if she had never left. As the two men get ready for bed, the priest discusses the dogmas of the Immaculate Conception, the virgin birth of Jesus, and the Assumption of Mary with them.

On the outskirts of Santiago de Compostela, the two pilgrims meet a prostitute who claims that the city is empty of pilgrims because it was discovered that it is not the remains of St. James but those of Priscillian that are held there. She says she wants to become pregnant by them, and gives the same names for the children as those predicted by the caped man at the beginning. The three head into the woods to have sex. Nearby, two blind men encounter Jesus and his disciples. Jesus heals their blindness, but they cannot understand what they see and continue to use their walking sticks.

== Cast ==
- Paul Frankeur as Pierre Dupont
- Laurent Terzieff as Jean Duval
- Alain Cuny as the man with a cape
- Édith Scob as the Virgin Mary
- Bernard Verley as Jesus
- François Maistre as the crazy French priest
- Claude Cerval as the brigadier
- Muni as the mother superior
- Julien Bertheau as Monsieur Richard, the maître d'hôtel
- Ellen Bahl as Madame Garnier, a diner at the hotel
- Michel Piccoli as the Marquis de Sade
- Agnès Capri as the director of Institution Lamartine
- Michel Etcheverry as the inquisitor
- Pierre Clémenti as the Angel of Death
- Georges Marchal as the Jesuit
- Jean Piat as the Jansenist
- Denis Manuel as Rodolphe
- Daniel Pilon as François
- Claudio Brook as the bishop
- Julien Guiomar as the Spanish priest
- Marcel Pérès as the Spanish innkeeper
- Delphine Seyrig as the prostitute
- Jose Berzosa as Priscillian's head deacon
- Jean-Claude Carrière as Priscillian
- Augusta Carrière as the crucified nun
- Jean-Daniel Ehrmann as the man condemned by the inquisitor
- Claude Jetter as the young woman at the Spanish inn
- Pierre Maguelon as the Guardia Civil corporal
- Bernard Musson as the French innkeeper
- Christine Simon as Thérèse, the young woman held captive by the Marquis de Sade
- Michel Dacquin as Monsieur Garnier, a diner at the hotel (uncredited)

== Production ==
Luis Buñuel and his screenwriting partner Jean-Claude Carrière wrote the first draft for The Milky Way in 1967 at the Parador Cazorla in the Andalusian mountains.

== Analysis ==
In the film, two men travel the ancient pilgrimage road to Santiago de Compostela and meet embodiments of various Catholic heresies along the way. These religious events are based on actual historical documents. For instance, the archbishop whose corpse is exhumed and publicly burned is based on Archbishop Carranza of Toledo. The film ends with the following text:

Everything in this film concerning the Catholic religion and the heresies it has provoked, especially from the dogmatic point of view, is rigorously exact. The texts and citations are taken either direct from Scripture, or modern and ancient works on theology and ecclesiastical history.

The film plays with time. The two main characters often encounter individuals in the dress of various time periods throughout history, or historical events take place in the modern setting of the film, including scenes from the life of Jesus Christ. In his autobiography, Buñuel explains that he wanted to put Jesus Christ in the film because he "wanted to show him as an ordinary man, laughing, running, mistaking his way, preparing to shave — to show, in other words, all those aspects completely alien to our traditional iconography."

Often, the encounters involve conversations or arguments regarding a specific Catholic doctrine or heresy and are intended to show the absurdity of making absolute statements about such topics as a "matter of fact". Two heresies prominent in the film are Priscillianism and Jansenism.

== Release ==
On 21 August 2007, The Criterion Collection released The Milky Way on DVD. On 23 July 2019, Kino Lorber made the film available via Blu-ray.

== Reception ==
On review aggregator website Rotten Tomatoes, The Milky Way has an approval rating of 95% based on 19 reviews, with an average score of 7.7/10.

Vincent Canby of The New York Times wrote "Everything is photographed straightforwardly, in cheerful but not bilious color, and seen with documentary-like clarity."

Neil Lumbard of Blu-ray.com called the film "A hypnotic and surreal journey only a director like Buñuel could bring viewers on."
