= Ilinca Manolache =

Romanian actress (born 1985)

- Born: 1 August 1985 (age 40); Bucharest, Romania

Ilinca Manolache (born 1 August 1985) is a Romanian actress.

== Early life and education ==
Manolache was born in Bucharest to actress Rodica Negrea and actor Dinu Manolache. In 2008, she graduated from the I. L. Caragiale National University of Theatre and Film.

== Career ==
After graduation, Manolache worked at Teatrul Mic in Bucharest.

Manolache is a frequent collaborator of director Radu Jude. She first appeared in his 2018 feature I Do Not Care If We Go Down in History as Barbarians, followed in 2021 by Bad Luck Banging or Loony Porn and the short film Caricaturana.

In 2021, Manolache created the character of Bobiță, a misogynist with a penchant for foul language and a distinctive appearance achieved using a Snapchat filter. While her Instagram videos as Bobiță were initially poorly received among her theater world contemporaries, the character was incorporated into her next collaboration with Jude, the 2023 comedy Do Not Expect Too Much from the End of the World.

== Personal life ==
Manolache identifies as a feminist, creating the character of Bobiță in response to sexist influencers like Andrew Tate and her frustration with the conservative theater world in Romania. She spoke out against the mistreatment of actresses when professor Șerban Puiu from her own alma mater was accused of harassing his acting students.

== Filmography ==
Year	Title	Role	Notes
2009	Weekend cu mama	Silvia	—N/a
2010	Bunraku	Prostitute	—N/a
2013	Funeralii fericite	Secretara Platou	—N/a
2015	Bucharest Non Stop	Ilinca	—N/a
2018	I Do Not Care If We Go Down in History as Barbarians	Oltea	—N/a
2020	Unidentified	Nepotica	—N/a
2021	Bad Luck Banging or Loony Porn	Tour Guide Parent	—N/a
2021	Caricaturana		Short film
2023	Do Not Expect Too Much from the End of the World	Angela Răducanu/Bobiță	—N/a
2025	Kontinental '25	Irina	—N/a
2025	Dracula		The film will have its world premiere at the Locarno in August, in the Main Competition section, where it competes for Golden Leopard.
2026	The Diary of a Chambermaid	Ilinca	
TBA	What Happens at Night		Filming

== Awards and nominations ==
Year	Award	Category	Nominated work	Result	Ref.
2023	Chicago International Film Festival	Silver Hugo for Best Performance	Do Not Expect Too Much from the End of the World	Won	
2024	Gopo Awards	Best Actress in a Leading Role	Do Not Expect Too Much from the End of the World	Won	
