= Do Not Expect Too Much from the End of the World =

2023 Romanian comedy film

- Promotional release poster
- Romanian: Nu astepta prea mult de la sfârsitul lumii
- Directed by: Radu Jude
- Written by: Radu Jude
- Produced by: Radu Jude; Adrian Sitaru; Ada Solomon
- Starring: Ilinca Manolache; Nina Hoss; Uwe Boll
- Cinematography: Marius Panduru
- Edited by: Cătălin Cristuțiu
- Release dates: 4 August 2023 (Locarno); 27 October 2023 (Romania)
- Running time: 163 minutes
- Countries: Romania; Croatia; France; Luxembourg
- Languages: Romanian; English; German; Hungarian; Italian
- Box office: $92,360

Do Not Expect Too Much from the End of the World (Romanian: Nu aștepta prea mult de la sfârșitul lumii) is a 2023 satirical absurdist black comedy film written and directed by Radu Jude. It stars Ilinca Manolache with supporting performances by Nina Hoss and Uwe Boll. It is a co-production between Romania, Croatia, France and Luxembourg.

The film premiered at the main competition of the 2023 Locarno Film Festival, where it received widespread critical acclaim, and the Special Jury Prize. Do Not Expect Too Much from the End of the World was later screened at the 2023 Toronto International Film Festival and at the 2023 New York Film Festival. It was selected as Romanian entry in the Best International Feature Film category for the 96th Academy Awards on 8 September 2023.

== Plot ==
Overworked and underpaid production assistant Angela is tasked to cast for a workplace safety video, commissioned by a multinational company headquartered in Austria. Starting her day at 5:50 AM, she drives around Bucharest to interview injured workers, powering through the day with caffeine while broadcasting profane and misogynist rants on Instagram as her Andrew Tate-esque male influencer alter ego, Bobiță, in her downtime. She takes a detour to negotiate the reburial of her grandparents, whose plot falls on a new housing development due to a clerical error. On an errand to pick up lenses, she runs into director Uwe Boll on set, and films a Bobiță video with him. At the apartment of a candidate, she meets a retired female taxi driver also named Angela, whose past exploits are depicted throughout the film using footage from Angela Goes On, a 1981 film directed by Lucian Bratu.

Ovidiu Bucă, a worker who fell into a coma following a traumatic head injury and is now confined to a wheelchair, is chosen as the star of the video following a Zoom meeting with the corporation's head of marketing, Doris Goethe. Taking advantage of a quick break, Angela meets up and has sex with her boyfriend in the car before heading to the airport to pick up Goethe, who has flown into Bucharest to oversee the shoot. During their drive, Angela shares that as a production assistant driving frequently and working extra hours, she is particularly afraid to drive on the DN2, where "there are more crosses for the people who died in accidents than kilometres." The film then shifts into a montage of crosses on the side of the road.

Shooting begins at the site of Ovidiu's injury the next day, which slowly falls into chaos as Ovidiu is made to repeatedly recount the details of the accident, during which he was hit in the head by a rusty bar. He reveals the poor conditions of the workplace and the company's liability, but is pressured to change his story and attribute the accident primarily to the fact that he was not wearing a safety helmet. His family becomes concerned that the statement will be used against them in their lawsuit against the company, even though they desperately need the money from the project. At the end of the shoot, the filmmakers invite the family to lunch. An indignant Angela convinces them to head home straightaway in her car instead.

== Cast ==
- Ilinca Manolache as Angela
- Nina Hoss as Doris Goethe
- Katia Pascariu as Ovidiu's Wife
- Sofia Nicolaescu as Ilinca
- Uwe Boll as himself
- László Miske as Gyuri
- Ovidiu Pîrsan as himself
- Dorina Lazăr as Angela
- Alex M. Dascălu as Dan Trofăilă
- Ioana Iacob as Production Team Member

== Production ==
The two stories that make up the film are both informed by director Radu Jude's own experience. The first finds its inspiration in a young production assistant Jude knew, who died in a car crash after falling asleep at the wheel due to overworking, while second in Jude's stint as a director of a work safety video for a corporation. The film's title comes from an aphorism by Polish poet Stanislaw Jerzy Lec.

== Release ==
Do Not Expect Too Much from the End of the World premiered at the 2023 Locarno Film Festival on 4 August 2023, where it received the Special Jury Prize. It was also invited at the 28th Busan International Film Festival in 'Icon' section and was screened on 5 October 2023.

Mubi had acquired all rights of the film for the US, as well as streaming rights in Canada, Germany, the Netherlands, India, Turkey and Latin America. The film was released on Mubi on 4 May 2024.

The film was released theatrically in Romania on 27 October 2023.

== Reception ==
On the review aggregator website Rotten Tomatoes, 97% of 74 critics' reviews are positive, with an average rating of 8.5/10. The website's consensus reads: "As unique and breathlessly expansive as its title, Do Not Expect Too Much from the End of the World adds to the evidence supporting Radu Jude's status as a uniquely gifted and provocative filmmaker." On the Metacritic website the movie has a score of 95 out of 100 indicating "universal acclaim" making it the highest reviewed movie of 2023.

In his review for The Guardian, Peter Bradshaw described Do Not Expect Too Much from the End of the World as follows: "Freewheeling essay-movie-slash-black-comedy collage takes swipes from all angles at modern life.". Matthew Joseph Jenner, writing for the International Cinephile Society, stated that the film is "a truly ambitious, beautifully complex, and deeply compelling masterpiece of purely playful postmodernism, which has never been more urgently required than it is at the present moment". The film also received very positive reviews in Indie Wire, Le Monde, D Movies, Screen Daily and Deadline, among others.

Do Not Expect Too Much from the End of the World was ranked seventh on Cahiers du Cinéma's top 10 films of 2023 list. The filmmakers Joanna Arnow and Todd Field both included ranked the film as one of their favorites of 2024. In June 2025, IndieWire ranked the film at number 38 on its list of "The 100 Best Movies of the 2020s (So Far)".

== References included ==
=== Quotations ===
- Matsuo Bashō
- Charles Baudelaire
- Thomas Bernhard
- Nicolae Bornemisa, social democratic politician from Aninoasa in the interbellum and the Communist takeover period
- Rolf Bossert, German-Romanian author
- Yosa Buson
- Don DeLillo
- Kobayashi Issa
- Alexander Kluge
- Stanisław Jerzy Lec
- Errol Morris
- Nicolae Steinhardt
- Karl Valentin
- Eva Wiseman - either a Jewish-Hungarian-born Canadian author, or a Jewish-British journalist
- Slavoj Žižek

=== Songs featured ===
- Manele
- Robotu, Sex Pula Pistol
- Motoric, Cosmin TRG
- Fredy Alcool, Sex Pula Pistol
- Panoramic, Cosmin TRG
- Ia d-aici că n-ai servici, Sandu Ciorbă
- Periplu euxin, Tam Nisam
- Dă-mi bă banii (feat. Lena), Matteo Islandezu
- Exercițiu, Valeriu Sterian
- Dă-i țiganca, Gheboasă
- Zob, Basm Epic
- Viva Mamaia, Loredana feat. Alex Velea, Cabron & Mazare
- Amintire cu haiduci, Valeriu Sterian
- Cuțu cuțu, Tom Boxer
- Tu locura, Sait Esmeray x Otilia
- Bagabont stilat, Amuly
- Fata de la radio, Dl Goe
- Șefu, Macamache
- O mână, Methadon 3000 (Vexxatu Vexx & DJ Sleek)
- Wolfgang Amadeus Mozart – Piano Concerto No. 1 in F major, K. 37
- Wolfgang Amadeus Mozart – Trio No.1 G major – III. Allegretto

=== Film and video references ===
- Employees Leaving the Lumière Factory, Louis Lumière
- Subterranean Homesick Blues, Bob Dylan (music video)
- Angela merge mai departe (Angela Goes on), 1981
- Freaks, Tod Browning (1932)
- David Hemmings, actor in Blowup, Michelangelo Antonioni (1966)
- Forbidden Planet (1956)

== See also ==
- List of submissions to the 96th Academy Awards for Best International Feature Film
- List of Romanian submissions for the Academy Award for Best International Feature Film
