= Conference of the Birds (play) =

The Persian poem The Conference of the Birds by Sufi poet Farid ud-Din Attar has received several stage adaptations, including by Falk Richter as a musical (2018), Sholeh Wolpé as a stage play (2018), ANIKAYA Dance Theater as dance (2018), and Peter Brook and Jean-Claude Carrière as a stage play (1979).

== 1979 play by Peter Brook and Jean-Claude Carrière ==
Peter Brook and Jean-Claude Carrière's play, La Conférence des oiseaux, was staged in 1979 and performed in various countries. In 2012, an adapted version was performed by the Folger theatre.

== 2014 dance theatre by Hafiz Karmali ==
Hafiz Karmali, Brandeis Theater Company's guest director of “The Conference of the Birds,” was in production at the Laurie Theater through November 2014. For all of its cultural, spiritual and religious symbolism, the performance also aims to be fun, Karmali says. “It’s written in a way that’s very lively and humorous, and we haven’t shied away from that,” he says. “This isn’t a church event, it’s fast paced dance theatre.” The production is a collaboration of the Department of Theater Arts, the Peacebuilding and the Arts Program and MusicUnitesUS. Cynthia Cohen, director of the Peacebuilding and the Arts Program, learned of Karmali's work through the Acting Together Project, which focuses on using performance art to build peace.

== 2018 musical by Falk Richter ==
In the Netherlands Falk Richter made a music theatre script based on the poem, which was performed in summer 2018 in Leeuwarden (one of the two European Capitals of Culture that year). The play was part of the activities of Leeuwarden-Fryslân 2018. Hundreds of Frisian amateur musicians played during the spectacle, as well as the musician Eric Vloeimans, and dancers and actors of Noord Nederlands Toneel and Club Guy & Roni. The music of the play was composed by Sytze Pruiksma; director was Guy Weizman.

The play was part of the project "King of the meadows" (Kening fan ‘e Greide) around the threatened position of the Black-tailed godwit.

The play aimed to address three issues: the deterioration of nature, the importance of art and (regional) culture and the power of the collective. Although the audience was enthusiastic about the play, not everyone appreciated the explicit normative message on bird protection.

== 2018 play by Sholeh Wolpé ==
Sholeh Wolpé's play, The conference of the Birds, was commissioned and performed by The Ubuntu Theater Project in Oakland, California. It ran from November 30 to December 16, 2018. The play was directed by Giulio Cesare Perrone.

== 2018 dance performance by ANIKAYA Dance Theater ==
In early 2018, ANIKAYA Dance Theater premiered The Conference of the Birds, an evening-length movement theater work inspired by the poem. It embodied stories gathered from modern-day refugees and other migrants. The dance was based on the new translation of the work by Sholeh Wolpé, published by W. W. Norton & Co. The piece was directed and choreographed by Wendy Jehlan. The music was composed by Shaw Pong Liu, Shaho Andalibi and Eric Raynaud, with projection design by David Bengali. The dancers were drawn from many countries around the world - Luciane Ramos da Silva (Brazil), Marcel Gbeffa (Benin), Ibrahim Abdo (Egypt), K Sarveshan (South Africa/India), Danang Pamungkas (Indonesia), Kae Ishimoto (Japan), Ching-I Chang (Taiwan), Yasin Anar (Turkey) and Yousef Sbieh (Palestine).
