= The Diary of a Chambermaid (1946 film) =

1946 film by Jean Renoir

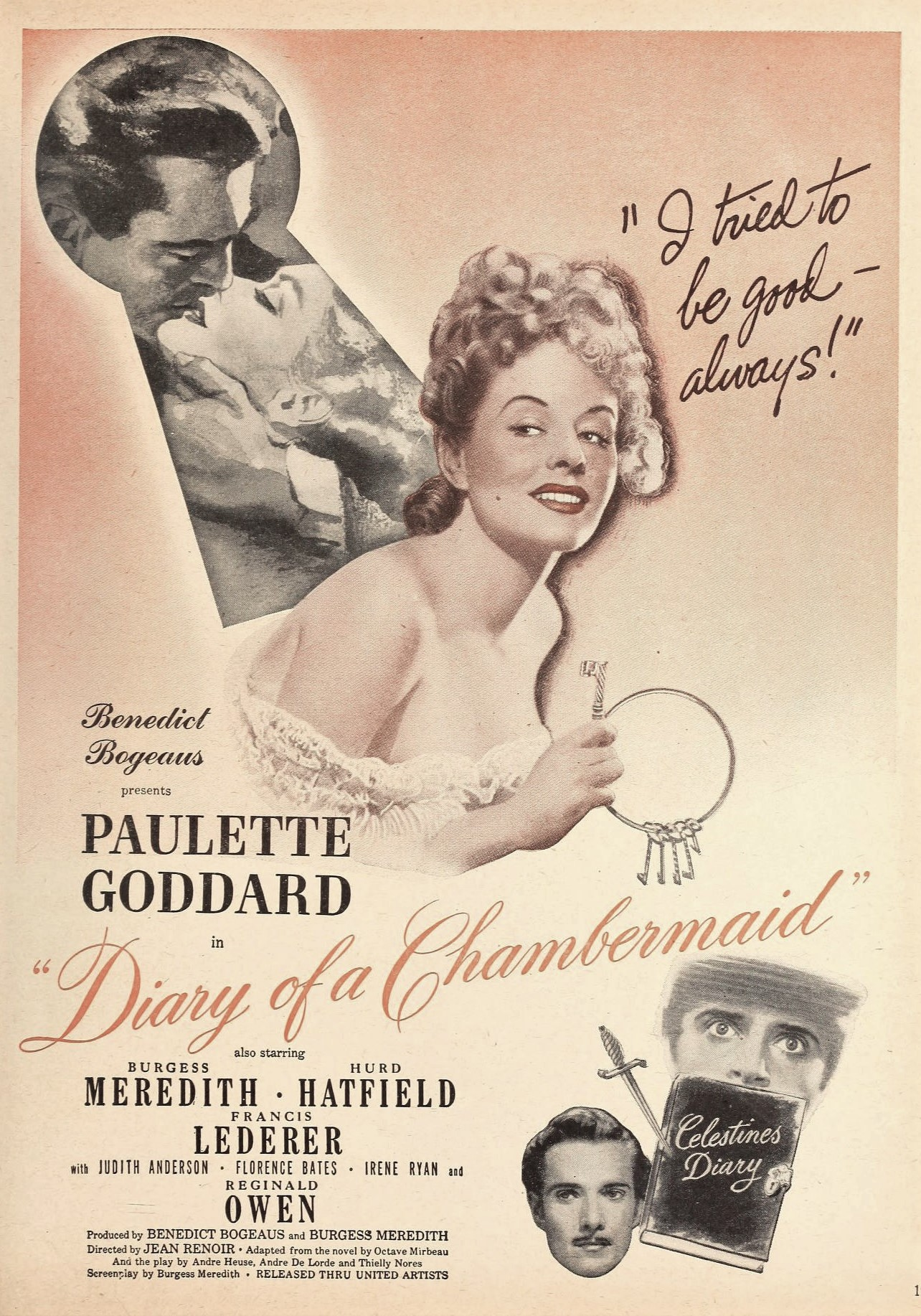
- Theatrical release poster
- Directed by: Jean Renoir
- Screenplay by: Burgess Meredith
- Based on: the novel by Octave Mirbeau and the play by André Heuse, André de Lorde, and Thielly Nores
- Produced by: Benedict Bogeaus; Burgess Meredith; Paulette Goddard (uncredited)
- Starring: Paulette Goddard; Burgess Meredith; Hurd Hatfield; Francis Lederer
- Cinematography: Lucien Andriot
- Edited by: James Smith
- Music by: Michel Michelet
- Production company: Benedict Bogeaus Productions
- Distributed by: United Artists
- Release date: February 15, 1946 (United States)
- Running time: 87 minutes
- Country: United States
- Language: English

The Diary of a Chambermaid is a 1946 American drama film about a newly hired servant who severely disrupts a wealthy family. The film was based on the 1900 novel of the same title by Octave Mirbeau and the play Le journal d'une femme de Chambre, written by André de Lorde, with André Heuse and Thielly Nores. The film was directed by Jean Renoir, and starred Paulette Goddard, Burgess Meredith, Hurd Hatfield, and Francis Lederer. It was named the eighth best English-language film of 1946 by the National Board of Review.

== Plot ==
In 1885 France, chambermaid Celestine begins her new position at the Lanlaire family home, a rural mansion, with the intention of moving up the social ladder. She starts working on her new employer, Monsieur Lanlaire, and he soon takes a liking to her, preferring her company to that of his domineering wife. Soon the eccentric neighbor, Captain Mauger becomes quite obsessed with having her working for him instead, and offers to marry her as reward for her coming to live with him, which would give her considerable wealth. Monsieur Lanlaire's sickly son Georges temporarily returns home to the estate, and in an attempt to make him stay longer, his mother does her best to make the attractive Celestine more beautiful by buying her fancy clothes, and orders her to take extra good care of her son.

Still, Georges makes plans to go back to Paris, and the desperate Madame Lanlaire orders Celestine, dressed only in her nightgown, to bring Georges some broth in his room. Georges realizes that his mother is trying to trick him into staying, and Celestine draws the same conclusion. Upset with Madame Lanlaire's attempts to manipulate her, Celestine quits her job and tries to catch a ride into town with the valet Joseph. He tells her of his plans to steal the silverware on Bastille Day, a few days away, and persuades Celestine to remain in the household as his accomplice.

Madame Lanlaire eavesdrops on their conversation and spoils the valet's plan. Instead, he starts planning to steal Captain Mauger's hidden money. While the captain is out celebrating, Joseph searches his house, and when the captain comes back and catches him red-handed, Joseph is forced to kill the captain to get away. Joseph tells the Lanlaires he intends to leave his position and marry Celestine, and Madame Lanlaire is overjoyed. She realizes her son Georges has fallen in love with Celestine. She agrees to give Joseph the silverware if he leaves the estate and takes Celestine with him. When Joseph and Celestine get delayed because of the celebrating crowds in the village, Georges manages to catch up with them, determined to win Celestine back. Joseph and Georges fight each other; Joseph is killed. Georges and Celestine go away together.

== Cast ==
- Paulette Goddard as Celestine
- Burgess Meredith as Captain Mauger
- Hurd Hatfield as Georges Lanlaire
- Francis Lederer as Joseph
- Judith Anderson as Madame Lanlaire
- Florence Bates as Rose
- Irene Ryan as Louise
- Reginald Owen as Captain Lanlaire

== Critical reception ==
On the film's original release, Variety wrote "This is an odd yarn, the type done so well by the French – and so falteringly by almost anyone else. Diary in its American form has not nearly the intrigue, nor the color, suggested by the original French version, but it has names and an interest all its own."

== See also ==
- List of American films of 1946
- Diary of a Chambermaid (1964 film), directed by Luis Buñuel
