= The Diary of a Chambermaid (2026 film) =

2026 drama film by Radu Jude

- French: Le journal d'une femme de chambre
- Directed by: Radu Jude
- Written by: Radu Jude
- Based on: The Diary of a Chambermaid by Octave Mirbeau
- Produced by: Saïd Ben Saïd
- Starring: Ana Dumitrașcu; Mélanie Thierry; Vincent Macaigne; Marie Rivière
- Cinematography: Marius Panduru
- Edited by: Cătălin Cristuțiu
- Production companies: SBS Productions; Avanpost
- Distributed by: Potemkine Films (France)
- Release date: 15 May 2026 (Cannes)
- Running time: 94 minutes
- Countries: France; Romania
- Languages: French; Romanian

The Diary of a Chambermaid (French: Le journal d'une femme de chambre) is a 2026 drama film written and directed by Radu Jude, in his French-language debut. It is loosely based on the novel of same name by Octave Mirbeau. Starring Ana Dumitrașcu, Mélanie Thierry and Vincent Macaigne, it follows Gianina (Dumitrașcu), a Romanian immigrant in Bordeaux, who is hired by a wealthy French family as cook, housekeeper and nanny.

The film had its world premiere in the Directors' Fortnight section of the 2026 Cannes Film Festival on 15 May.

== Premise ==
Gianina, a young Romanian immigrant in France, works as a housekeeper for the bourgeois family Donnadieu.

== Cast ==
- Ana Dumitrașcu as Gianina
- Mélanie Thierry as Marguerite Donnadieu
- Vincent Macaigne as Pierre Donnadieu
- Marie Rivière as Madame Anne
- Louen Bouteiller as Louen
- Arnaud Baudoin as Kalil
- Ilinca Manolache as Ilinca
- Sofia Dragoman as Maria
- Liliana Ghiță as Bunica

== Production ==
It was produced by Saïd Ben Saïd's SBS Productions, co-produced by Vlad Răduleșcu and Carmen Rizac's Avanpost, with the support of Canal +, Ciné+ OCS, Centre national du cinéma et de l'image animée, Eurimages, La région Nouvelle-Aquitaine, Bordeaux Métropole, BRD – Groupe Société Générale, Cinecap 9 and Cofinova 22.

Principal photography began in October 2025, in Bordeaux. Shooting wrapped on 3 November.

Director Radu Jude clarified that the adaptation would not strictly follow Mirbeau's work, but that he appropriated the story of a young, precarious immigrant worker and adapted it in the context of contemporary France.

== Release ==
The film had its world premiere at the Directors' Fortnight section of the 2026 Cannes Film Festival on 15 May, marking Jude's first entry at the festival with a feature-length film. It will have its North American premiere in the Wavelengths section of the 2026 Toronto International Film Festival, and was also selected for the Main Slate of the 2026 New York Film Festival.

International sales will be handled by SBS International.
