= The Diary of a Chambermaid (novel) =

1900 novel by Octave Mirbeau

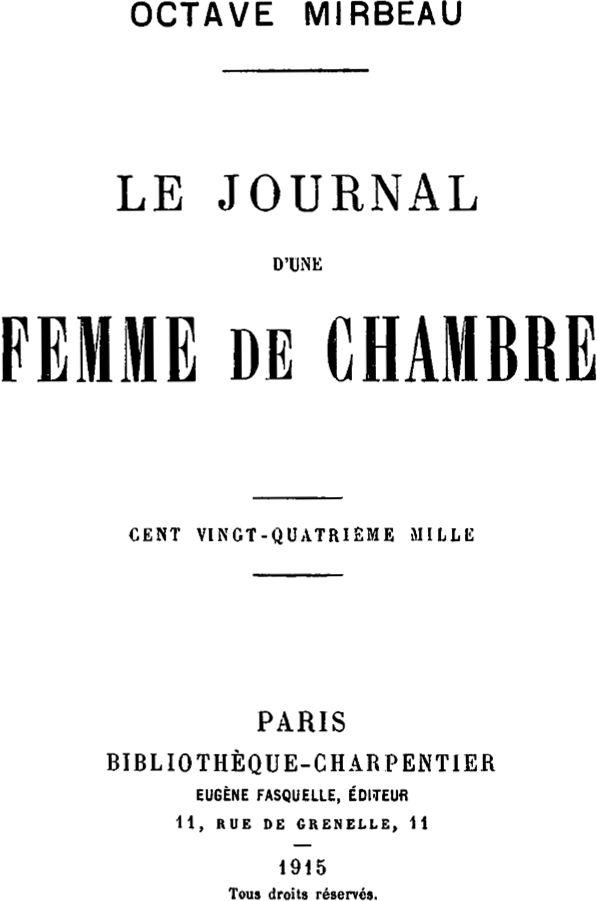
- Title Page. 1915 Bibliothèque-Charpentier edition.
- Author: Octave Mirbeau
- Original title: Le Journal d'une femme de chambre
- Language: French
- Genre: Decadent movement
- Publisher: Fasquelle
- Publication date: 1900
- OCLC: 5323544

The Diary of a Chambermaid (French: Le Journal d'une femme de chambre) is a 1900 Decadent novel by Octave Mirbeau, published during the Dreyfus affair. First published in serialized form in L'Écho de Paris from 1891 to 1892, Mirbeau's novel was reworked and polished before appearing in the Dreyfusard journal La Revue Blanche in 1900.

== Plot ==
The novel presents itself as the diary of Mademoiselle Célestine R., a chambermaid. Her first employer fetishizes her boots, and she later discovers the elderly man dead, with one of her boots stuffed into his mouth. Later on, Célestine becomes the maid of an upper class couple, Lanlaire, and is perfectly aware that she is entangled in the power struggles of their marriage. Célestine ends by becoming a café hostess, who mistreats her servants in turn.

== Commentary ==
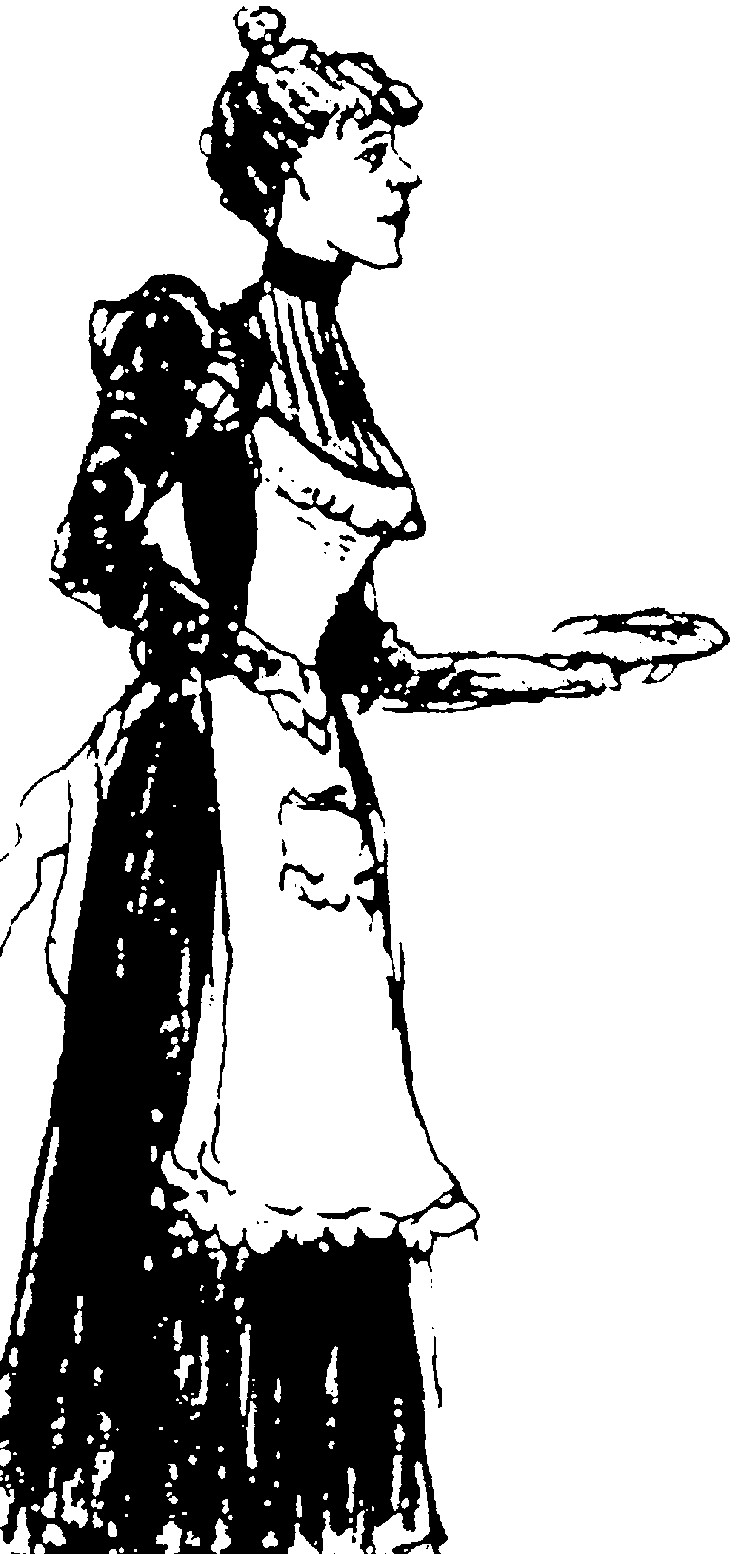
Célestine, by Octave Mirbeau.

As an anarchist writer, Octave Mirbeau chose to narrate the novel from the perspective of a maidservant, Célestine: a perspective considered unconventional for the period. Through Célestine observations ,often made through keyholes, the novel exposes the private conduct of the upper classes critiquing what Mirbeau characterized as the moral failings of the dominant social strata. The work depicts members of high society as outwardly respectable while portraying their private lives as marked by hypocrisy and moral corruption.

Ending up in a Norman town at the home of the Lanlaires, with their grotesque family name, who owe their unjustifiable wealth to their respective 'honourable' parents' swindlings, she evokes, as she recalls her memories, all the jobs that she has done for years in the swankiest households, and draws a conclusion that the reader is invited to make his own: «However vile the riff-raff may be, they are never as vile as decent people.» (« Si infâmes que soient les canailles, ils ne le sont jamais autant que les honnêtes gens. »)

Octave Mirbeau denounces domestic service as a modern form of slavery. However, he offers no sentimentalised image of the underclass, as servants exploited by their masters are ideologically alienated themselves: « D'être domestique, on a ça dans le sang... ».

With its fractured exposition, its temporal dislocations, its clashing styles, and varying forms, Mirbeau's novel breaks with the conventions of the realistic novel and relinquishes all claims to documentary objectivity and narrative linearity.

== Adaptations ==
=== Film ===
The novel has been loosely adapted for cinema multiple times:

- 1916, a Russia film, Dnevnik gornitchnoi (Дневник горничной) by M. Martov.
- 1946, an American film, The Diary of a Chambermaid by Jean Renoir, starring Paulette Goddard.
- 1964, Le Journal d’une femme de chambre by Luis Buñuel, in French, starring Jeanne Moreau, Georges Géret and Michel Piccoli.
- 2015, Journal d’une femme de chambre by Benoît Jacquot, in French, starring Léa Seydoux and Vincent Lindon.
- 2026, Journal d’une femme de chambre by Radu Jude, in French and Romanian, starring Ana Dumitrașcu, Marie Rivière and Mélanie Thierry.

=== Stage ===
- It was also made into a play by Andre Heuse, André de Lorde, and Thielly Nores.
- Plenty of theatrical adaptations have been made during the last 20 years, in French, but also in Italian, English, Spanish, Dutch and German.
- In 2004, a new American theatrical adaptation of Diary of A Chambermaid produced by Antonia Fairchild and directed by Adrian Giurgea, had its world-premiere in New York City.
