= Célestine (Mirbeau) =

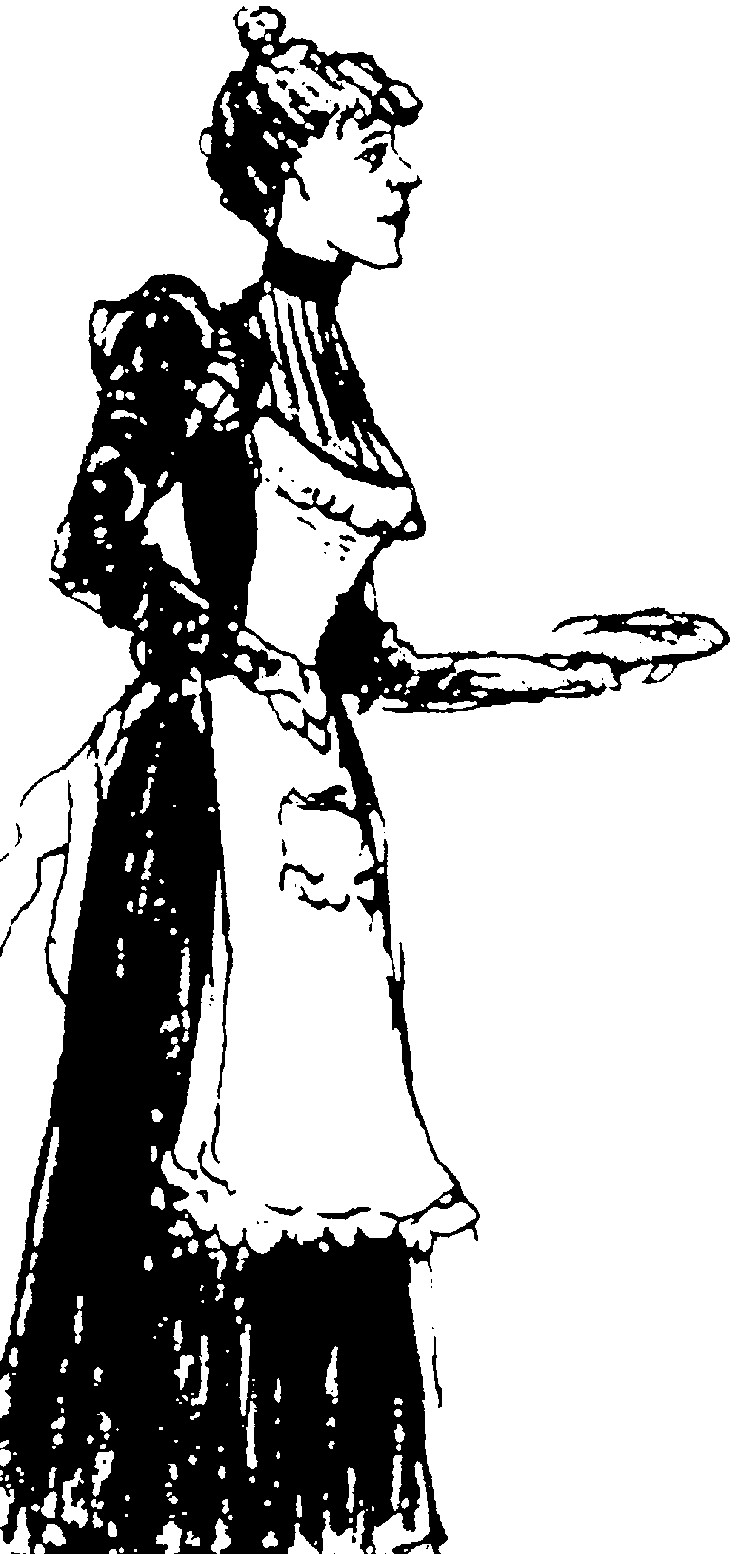
- Célestine, by Octave Mirbeau
- First appearance: The Diary of a Chambermaid (1900)
- Created by: Octave Mirbeau

In-universe information
- Species: Human
- Gender: Female
- Occupation: Chambermaid
- Nationality: French

Célestine is the main character and the narrator of the French novel by Octave Mirbeau, The Diary of a Chambermaid (fr. Le Journal d'une femme de chambre), 1900.

== The tribulations of a domestic servant ==
Célestine is a lively housemaid, born at Audierne, in Brittany, the daughter of a sailor. Orphaned at a very early age, she lost her virginity at the age of twelve at the hands of the repulsive Cléophas Biscouille, in return for an orange. The novelist leaves Célestine without a surname, just like Clara in The Torture Garden (Le Jardin des supplices, 1899). As a result of working in a succession of fashionable Parisian houses, Célestine has acquired a veneer of manners, she knows how to dress, and she handles the French language well. Above all, in the course of some twenty years of exploitation at the hands of various odious employers, her sharp sense of observation has equipped her to identify all the moral failings of the well-to-do, and she makes use of her personal diary to avenge herself of her humiliations by wrenching off their mask of respectability to expose their essential nastiness: "It's not my fault", she says, "if their souls, stripped naked of their veils, exhale such a strong odour of corruption".

As the novel opens, we find Célestine, bored to death, working in the home of the Lanlaires at Le Mesnil-Roy, a town on the river Eure, modelled on Pont-de-l'Arche. Her only distraction comes on Sundays, when she is able to listen to the village gossip in a ‘dirty little haberdasher's' house, where she can chat with Rose, the servant-cum-mistress of the Lanlaire's ridiculous neighbour, Captain Mauger. After Rose's death, the captain offers Célestine the opportunity to take her place; but she repels this grotesque puppet of a man, along with all his hateful and debauched habits.

By contrast, she is fascinated by the mysterious Joseph, the gardener-coachman – a notorious antisemite and an extreme antidreyfusard who, to begin with, disturbs and intrigues Célestine a great deal, and on whom she tries to spy for a while. She even gets it into her head that Joseph has violated and savagely killed a little girl, Claire, in the local woods. And yet, far from being horrified by this, she finds herself even more attracted to him, to the point where she is prepared to follow him "into crime" (these are the closing words of her diary). When Joseph manages to get away with stealing the Lanlaires' silver – which will set him up in his own business and help to make him well-off – she unhesitatingly accepts his invitation to follow him to Cherbourg, where she marries him and helps him to run the "little café of his dreams", which frequented by the town's nationalists. On becoming an employer in her own right, she misses no opportunity to bully her own serving-girls.

== A Janus-like personality ==
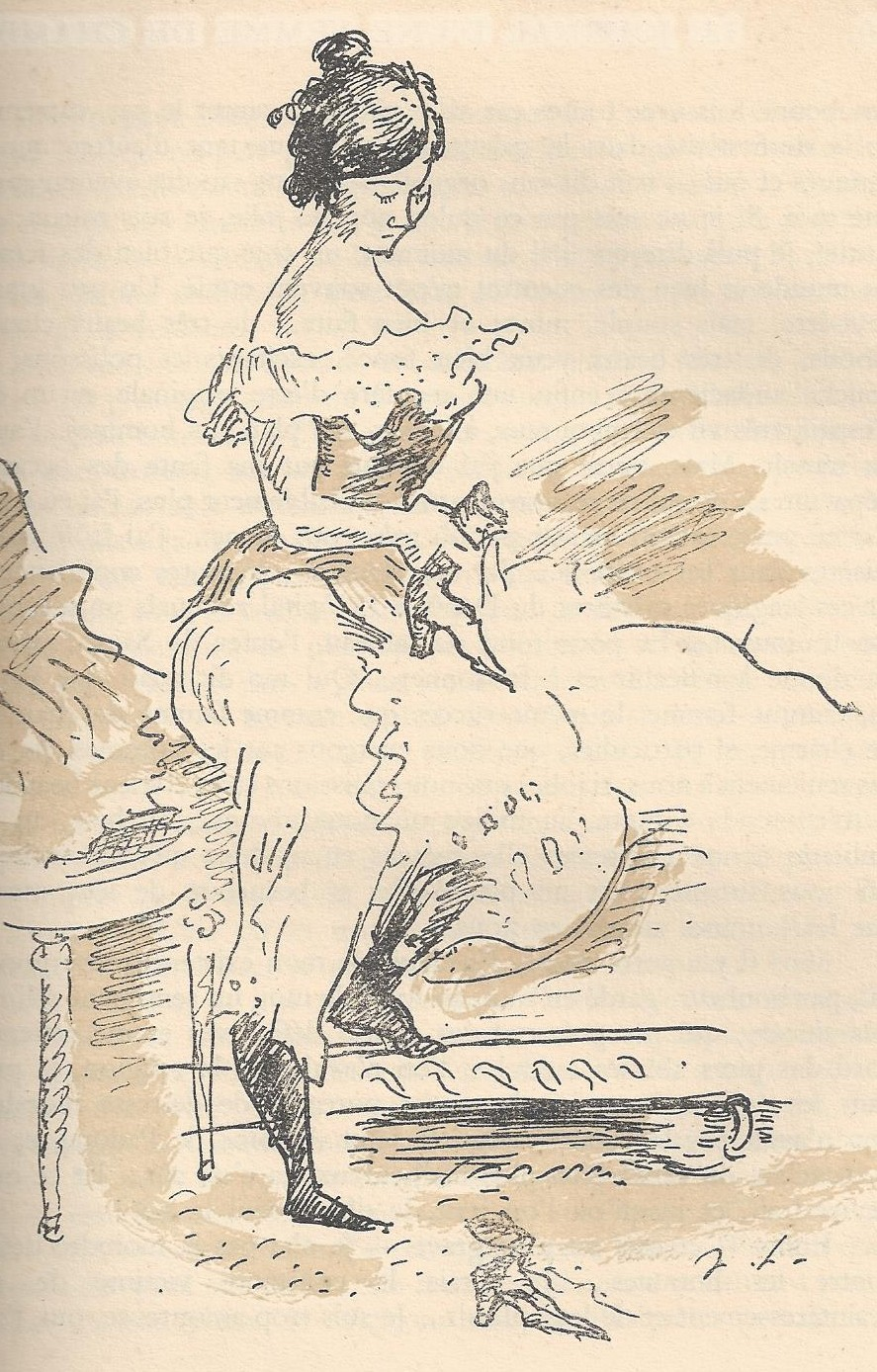
Jean Launois, Célestine, 1935

Célestine is a complex character. She has Mirbeau's lucidity, which enables her not only to make pungent criticisms of contemporary society but also lends her a personal style without stretching the reader's credibility. But is it therefore correct to conclude that the diarist is merely the mouthpiece of the novelist? That would be going too far, since Célestine (like Clara in The Torture Garden) conforms to the logic of her own character.

Célestine's contradictions, disconcerting for the reader, make it difficult to have much faith, if any, in what she actually thinks and says. Whilst tirelessly denouncing her employers' depravity, she is herself envious of the money that confers outward respectability on the middle classes. Whilst being sexually liberated and ready to take her pleasures wherever she can, she nevertheless regards some of her employers' practices as obscene. Whilst harbouring no illusions about the Roman Catholic Church, she still nurses a certain nostalgia for her own childhood faith. After violently denouncing the universal exploitation and humiliation of domestic servants, she becomes very overbearing with her own maids. Whilst claiming to thirst for justice, she is indifferent to the fate of Dreyfus and becomes the accomplice of a thief and a child-murderer. If Célestine herself is unable to give positive substance to her revolt, and resigns herself to climbing the social hierarchy instead of trying to overthrow the established order, what more can be expected of the oppressed and exploited masses?

By her contradictions, Célestine illustrates the pessimism of Octave Mirbeau the novelist, who does not believe in the power of reason to control human behaviour, nor considers that man is perfectible, but who instead sees in "the law of murder" the ruling principle that dominates not only nature, but also society and the relationship between men and between the sexes.
