= Jacques Marin =

French actor (1919–2001)

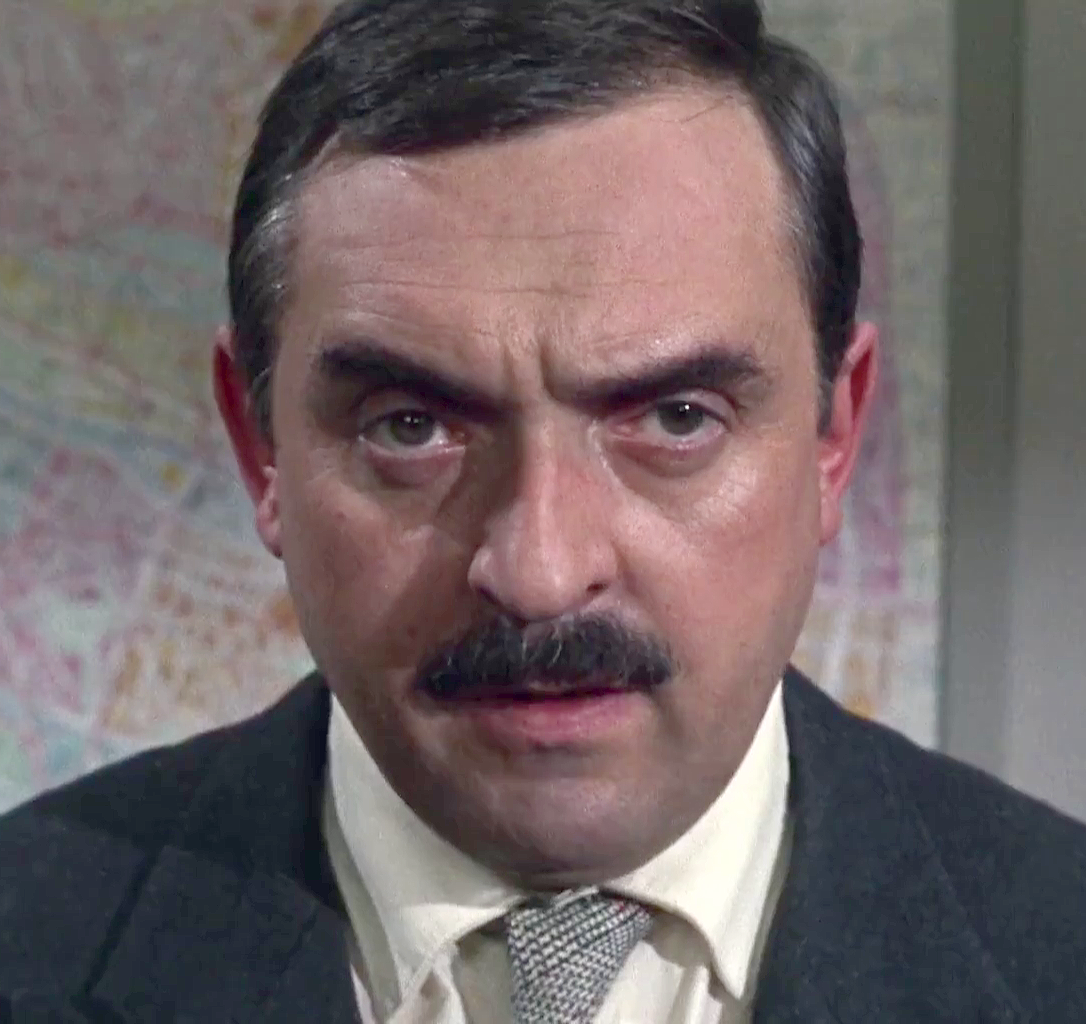
- Marin in Charade, 1963
- Born: 9 September 1919; Paris, France
- Died: 10 January 2001 (aged 81); Cannes, France
- Occupation: Actor
- Years active: 1946–1994

Jacques Marin (9 September 1919 – 10 January 2001) was a French actor on film and television. Marin's fluency in English and his instantly recognisable features made him a familiar face in some major American and British productions (Charade, The Train, Marathon Man), and Disney movies (The Island at the Top of the World and Herbie Goes to Monte Carlo).

== Selected filmography ==
- Le Beau Voyage (1947) as Un voyou
- L'assassin est à l'écoute (1948) as Barman (uncredited)
- Forbidden Games (1952) as Georges Dolle
- We Are All Murderers (1952) as Un gardien au bar (uncredited)
- Double or Quits (1953) as Lucien
- Before the Deluge (1954) as L'ouvrier à bicyclette (uncredited)
- J'y suis, j'y reste (1954) (uncredited)
- Faites-moi confiance (1954) as Bob (uncredited)
- Papa, Mama, the Maid and I (1954) as Gaston, un voisin
- Sur le banc (1954)
- Ça va barder (1955) as L'inspecteur
- French Cancan (1955) as Un spectateur (uncredited)
- La Rue des bouches peintes (1955) as Le policier
- Men in White (1955)
- Les Évadés (1955) as Un prisonnier
- Papa, maman, ma femme et moi (1955) as Le garagiste (uncredited)
- Black Dossier (1955) as Un policier
- Gas-Oil (1955) as Un gendarme au commissariat
- L'Amant de lady Chatterley (1955) as Un habitué du pub
- If Paris Were Told to Us (1956) as Un gardien de prison (uncredited)
- People of No Importance (1956) as Armand - le routier qui fesse Clotilde
- Naughty Girl (1956) as Gendarme
- Mon curé chez les pauvres (1956) (uncredited)
- Marie Antoinette Queen of France (1956) as Crieur de journaux
- Ces sacrées vacances (1956) as L'automobiliste
- Le Sang à la tête (1956) as L'agent de police (uncredited)
- Paris, Palace Hotel (1956) as Le livreur de fleurs au Palace
- La Traversée de Paris (1956) as Le patron du restaurant Saint Martin
- Reproduction interdite (1957) (uncredited)
- Le rouge est mis (1957) as Un agent (uncredited)
- The Vintage (1957) as Cousin (uncredited)
- Le coin tranquille (1957) (uncredited)
- Three Days to Live (1957) as Le gendarme
- Gates of Paris (1957) as Un inspecteur (uncredited)
- La Parisienne (1957) as Le policier motard (uncredited)
- La Tour, prends garde ! (1958) as Aristide Cornilion (uncredited)
- Les Misérables (1958) as Le messager
- Le Temps des œufs durs (1958) as Le pêcheur
- The Lovers of Montparnasse (1958) as Le patron du café (uncredited)
- Le désordre et la nuit (1958) as Le garçon de café (uncredited)
- In Case of Adversity (1958) as Le réceptionniste de l'hôtel Trianon
- Young Sinners (1958) as Monsieur Félix
- The Roots of Heaven (1958) as Cerisot
- Le Miroir à deux faces (1958) as Un professeur - collègue de Pierre
- Madame et son auto (1958) as Rouille
- Le Joueur (1958) as L'employé du casino qui cherche sous la table
- Guinguette (1959) as Albert
- Drôles de phénomènes (1959) as L'inspecteur
- Archimède le clochard (1959) as Mimile
- Croquemitoufle (1959) as Le contrôleur
- La Bête à l'affût (1959) as Lesquet (uncredited)
- Maigret and the Saint-Fiacre Case (1959) as Albert, le chauffeur
- Rue des prairies (1959) as M. Mauduis (uncredited)
- Match contre la mort (1959)
- Pantalaskas (1960) as Tropmann
- Monsieur Suzuki (1960)
- Au coeur de la ville (1960)
- Crack in the Mirror (1960) as Watchman
- The Enemy General (1960) as Marceau
- The Old Guard (1960) as Le gendarme au saut de chaîne de vélo (uncredited)
- Love and the Frenchwoman (1960) as Controller (segment "Mariage, Le")
- Vers l'extase (1960) as Le boucher
- The Truth (1960) as Le conducteur du bus
- La pendule à Salomon (1961)
- Arrêtez les tambours (1961) as Gaspard, the grocer
- The President (1961) as Le chauffeur du car
- The Big Gamble (1961) as The Hotel Clerk
- Le cave se rebiffe (1961) as L'inspecteur Larpin - de la Brigade des Moeurs (uncredited)
- The Black Monocle (1961) as Trochu
- Tiara Tahiti (1962) as Desmoulins
- Portrait-robot (1962)
- Gigot (1962) as Jean
- The Gentleman from Epsom (1962) as Raoul
- Five Miles to Midnight (1962) (uncredited)
- Two Are Guilty (1963) as Un gendarme (uncredited)
- Méfiez-vous, mesdames (1963) as L'inspecteur Lebrun
- Charade (1963) as Insp. Edouard Grandpierre
- Anatomy of a Marriage: My Days with Françoise (1964) (uncredited)
- The Train (1964) as Jacques
- Vacaciones para Ivette (1964) as Noel Bernard
- Umorismo in nero (1965) as segment 1 'La Bestiole'
- How to Keep the Red Lamp Burning (1965) as Le brocanteur déménageur (segment "Fermeture, La")
- Fantômas se déchaîne (1965) as L'agent de police ferroviaire
- Paris in August (1966) as Bouvreuil
- Lost Command (1966) as Mayor
- How To Steal a Million (1966) as Chief Guard
- The 25th Hour (1967) as The Soldier at Dobresco's
- The Oldest Profession (1967) as Un agent de police (segment "Aujourd'hui") (uncredited)
- L'Homme à la Buick (1968) as Un déménageur
- The Girl on a Motorcycle (1968) as Pump Attendant
- The Night of the Following Day (1968) as Bartender
- A Very Curious Girl (1969) as Félix Lechat
- Trois hommes sur un cheval (1969) as Fernand
- Tintin and the Temple of the Sun (1969) as Un des 7 savants (voice)
- Darling Lili (1970) as Major Duvalle
- To Die of Love (1971) as Le correspondant
- Le Cinéma de papa (1971) as L'acteur jouant le chef de gare dans le film américain
- Le petit matin (1971) as Ladouhère
- Jo (1971) as Andrieux
- Le drapeau noir flotte sur la marmite (1971) as Antoine Simonet
- A Time for Loving (1972) as Chauffeur
- Shaft in Africa (1973) as Cusset
- Now Where Did the 7th Company Get to? (1973) as L'épicier
- S*P*Y*S (1974) as Lafayette
- Les murs ont des oreilles (1974) as Lucas, le jardinier
- Vos gueules, les mouettes ! (1974) as Le porte-bannière
- Impossible Is Not French (1974) as Dussautoy
- The Island at the Top of the World (1974) as Captain Brieux
- Opération Lady Marlène (1975) as Le bistrot
- Flic Story (1975) as Le patron de l'auberge à Saint-Rémy
- Catherine et Compagnie (1975) as Le patron de l'agence de location de voitures
- Bons Baisers de Hong Kong (1975) as Le gradé de la police
- L'Année sainte (1976) as Moreau, le gardien de prison
- Marathon Man (1976) as LeClerc
- The Smurfs and the Magic Flute (1976) as Schtroumpf-Fête (voice)
- Le Jour de gloire (1976) as Le bistrot
- Herbie Goes to Monte Carlo (1977) as Inspector Bouchet
- Le mille-pattes fait des claquettes (1977) as L'inspecteur de police
- L'horoscope (1978) as J.L. Beauché
- Who Is Killing the Great Chefs of Europe? (1978) as Massenet
- Général... nous voilà ! (1978) as Mac Goland
- Grandison (1979) as Hauswirt
- Les Fabuleuses Aventures du legendaire Baron de Munchausen (1979) as Hercule (voice)
- Ach du lieber Harry (1981) as Hochwürden Harry
- Te marre pas ... c'est pour rire ! (1982) as Albert
- Le Secret des sélénites (1984) as Hercule (voice)
- A Star for Two (1991) as Raymond
- Monsters, Inc. (2001) as Dr. Frasenberger (voice)
