= Jacques Monod (actor) =

French actor

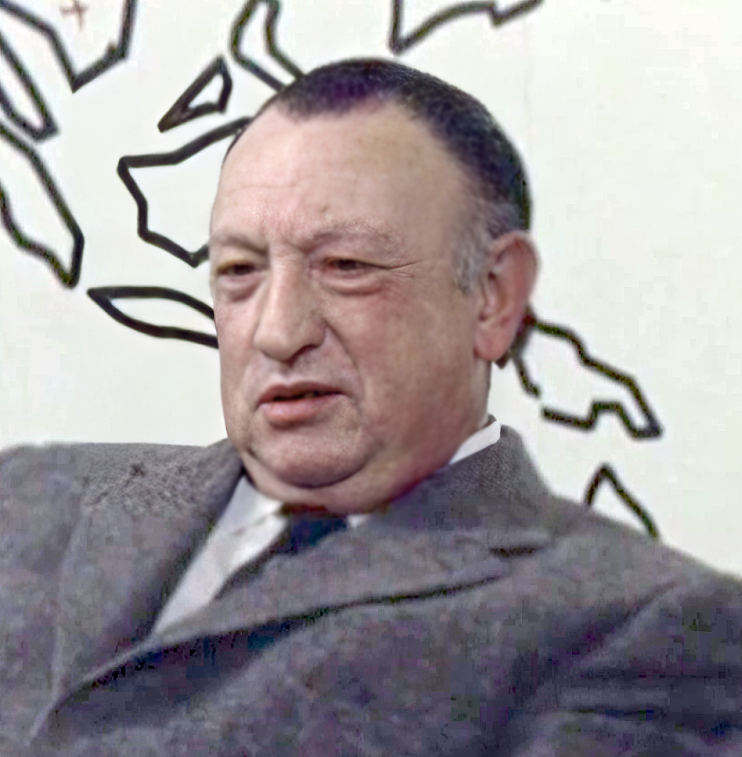
- Image of Jacques Monod
- Born: 21 August 1918; Casablanca, Morocco
- Died: 25 December 1985 (aged 67); Paris, France
- Occupation: Actor
- Years active: 1947-1985

Jacques Monod (21 August 1918 – 25 December 1985) was a French actor. He appeared in more than one hundred films from 1947 to 1985.

== Filmography ==
Year	Title	Role	Notes
1949	Un flic	Petit rôle	Uncredited
1951	Dr. Knock	M. Albos, le premier trombone	Uncredited
1951	Great Man	Le gendarme	Uncredited
1956	I'll Get Back to Kandara		
1958	Thérèse Étienne	Le médecin	
1958	The Possessors	Le ministre des finances	
1959	The 400 Blows	Commissioner	
1959	Witness in the City	L'avocat de Verdier	
1959	125, rue Montmartre	Le médecin	Uncredited
1959	Rue des prairies	Le président	
1959	La verte moisson		
1961	The President	Mulstein	Uncredited
1961	The End of Belle	Le juge d'instruction Bechman / Judge Bechman	
1961	Les Livreurs	Le Président	
1961	Famous Love Affairs	Preissing	(segment "Agnès Bernauer")
1961	Les Nouveaux Aristocrates	Charles, l'avocat	
1962	Les Ennemis	Raoul Gerlier	
1962	Emile's Boat	Maître Lamazure	
1962	The Seven Deadly Sins	Monsieur Jasmin	(segment "Envie, L'")
1962	Le Petit Garçon de l'ascenseur	Me Hérault	
1962	The Seventh Juror	Magistrate	
1962	The Law of Men	Helmut	
1962	Thérèse Desqueyroux	Maître Duros	
1962	And Satan Calls the Turns	Monsieur Klaus	
1962	Pourquoi Paris ?	Le restaurateur	Uncredited
1963	Enough Rope	Le commissaire / Police Commissioner	
1963	Two Are Guilty	Le commissaire Pranzini	
1963	Don't Tempt the Devil	Le procureur Magnin	
1963	Germinal	Deneulin	
1963	Blague dans le coin	Stenberg	
1964	Mort, où est ta victoire?	Le docteur Epautre	
1964	Anatomy of a Marriage: My Days with Jean-Marc	Rouquier	
1964	Anatomy of a Marriage: My Days with Françoise	Rouquier	
1964	Mission to Venice	Colonel Vallier	
1964	Une ravissante idiote	Surgeon - the chauffeur	
1964	À couteaux tirés	Lucien Leonetti	
1964	Le Gros Coup	L'agent d'assurances	
1964	Coplan prend des risques	Le "vieux"	
1964	Requiem pour un caïd	Le commissaire	
1965	Heaven on One's Head	Commandant Ravesne	
1965	Crime on a Summer Morning	Joseph Lucas	
1965	Marco the Magnificent	Nicolo de Vicenza, a Knight Templar	
1966	Mademoiselle	Mayor	
1966	Trap for the Assassin	Le président des Assises	
1966	The Game Is Over	M. Sernet	
1966	Le Chien fou	Mario	
1966	Black Sun	Gorel	
1967	The Oldest Profession	Un homme du peuple	(segment "Mademoiselle Mimi"), Uncredited
1967	The Stranger		
1967	Dirty Heroes	Partisan	
1968	Darling Caroline	De Carilly, le docteur	
1969	Under the Sign of the Bull	L'industriel Marchal	
1969	Les Hors-la-loi	L'administrateur	
1970	Distracted	M. Malaquet	
1971	Sapho ou la Fureur d'aimer	M. de Lancey	
1972	Les malheurs d'Alfred		Voice, Uncredited
1973	Sans sommation	Le député	
1973	Lucky Luciano		
1973	Two Men in Town	Le procureur	
1975	Maître Pygmalion		
1975	On a retrouvé la septième compagnie	Panadon	
1976	Oublie-moi, Mandoline	Le contrôleur du fisc	
1976	The Tenant	Cafe Owner	
1976	L'Arriviste	Goldberg	
1977	Un tueur, un flic, ainsi soit-il...	Larzac - l'industriel	
1979	Le Temps des vacances	Le directeur	
1980	Cherchez l'erreur	Oscar	
1981	Le bahut va craquer	L'inspecteur de police	
1981	La Gueule du loup	Le commissaire	
1983	Sandy	Le directeur du théâtre	
1983	Les malheurs d'Octavie	Le beau-père	
