= Alfred Adam =

French actor (1908–1982)

- Born: Alfred Roger Adam; 4 April 1908; Asnières, Hauts-de-Seine, Île-de-France, France
- Died: 7 May 1982 (aged 74); Le Perreux-sur-Marne, Val-de-Marne, France
- Years active: 1935–1974

Alfred Roger Adam (4 April 1908 – 7 May 1982) was a French stage and film character actor, who usually played weak or villainous roles.

"In the cast of 25," a reviewer in Billboard wrote of a 1947 Paris production of Le Sexe Faible (The Weaker Sex), "acting honors belong almost exclusively to Alfred Adam, who plays Antoine, the ubiquitous maitre d'hotel, with a remarkable balance of caricature and seriousness It a character worth of Moliere. Played with Adam's sureness and dexterity, it remains unforgettable."

== Selected filmography ==
- Speedway (1929) - Doctor (uncredited)
- La Kermesse Héroïque (1935) - Josef Van Meulen, le boucher
- In the Service of the Tsar (1936) - Ossip
- Life Dances On (1937) - Fred
- People Who Travel (1938) - Le médecin (uncredited)
- La Glu (1938) - Raoul
- Je chante... (1938) - Alfred
- The Duraton Family (1939) - Le docteur
- Sur le Plancher des Vaches (1940) - Le journaliste (uncredited)
- The Chain Breaker (1941) - Guillaume
- The Woman I Loved Most (1942) - Charles, le fondé de pouvoir
- Sideral Cruises (1942) - Le décorateur (uncredited)
- At Your Command, Madame (1942) - Ferdinand - le chauffeur de Palureau
- Home Port (1943) - Bertrand
- Farandole (1945) - Le marlou
- Boule de Suif (1945) - Cornudet
- La Vie de Bohème (1945m) - Alexandre Schaunard
- La Ferme du Pendu (1945) - Louis Raimondeau dit 'Grand Louis'
- Le Bateau à soupe (1946) - Le Hénaff
- The Fugitive (1947) - Bank
- Chinese Quarter (1947) - Léo Seller
- Les beaux jours du roi Murat (1947) - Le roi Murat
- The Lost Village (1947) - Gustave Boeuf
- Woman Without a Past (1948) - Pierre Lorin
- Passeurs d'or (1948) - Gueule en or
- Jo la Romance (1949) - Stoff
- L'homme aux mains d'argile (1949) - Lucien Roupp dit Monsieur Lucien - le manager
- The Farm of Seven Sins (1949) - Symphorien Dubois
- The Sky Sorcerer (1949) - Samson
- The King (1949) - Bourdier
- My Friend Sainfoin (1950) - Guillaume de Puycharmois - le mari d'Eugénie
- The Straw Lover (1950) - Gaston Sarrazin de Fontenoy
- Darling Caroline (1951) - Jules, le postillon
- My Wife Is Formidable (1951) - Dr. Gaston Rival
- The Case Against X (1952) - Le vendeur de boutons (uncredited)
- Capitaine Pantoufle (1953)
- The Fighting Drummer (1953) - Favrol
- The Drunkard (1953) - Georges Lamarche
- The Most Wanted Man (1953) - Le shérif
- Il cavaliere di Maison Rouge (1954) - Dixmaire
- Service Entrance (1954) - Le cousin Albert
- Cadet Rousselle (1954) - Ravignol
- Caroline and the Rebels (1955) - Le général de Lasalle
- La Famille Anodin (1956) - Armand Vignaud
- Tides of Passion (1956) - Armand Vignaud
- Les Sorcières de Salem (1957) - Thomas Putnam
- A Kiss for a Killer (1957) - L'inspecteur de police Malard
- Maigret Sets a Trap (1958) - Emile Barberot - le boucher (uncredited)
- The Tiger Attacks (1959) - Le colonel - chef de la D.S.T.
- Les Naufrageurs (1959) - Le commissaire
- The Gendarme of Champignol (1959) - M. Grégoire 'Grégorio' - le maire
- 125 Rue Montmartre (1959) - Phillipe Barrachet
- Rue des prairies (1960) - Loutrel le manager de Louis
- La main chaude (1960) - Jean Lécuyer
- Women Are Like That (1960) - Pascal Girotti
- Love and the Frenchwoman (1960) - Judge (segment "Divorce, Le")
- Le Président (1961) - François - le chauffeur
- La Belle Américaine (1961) - Alfred
- All the Gold in the World (1961) - Alfred
- My Life to Live (1962) - (uncredited)
- Tartarin of Tarascon (1962) - Prince Gregori de Montenegro
- Carom Shots (1963) - Hubert Beaumanoir
- Mort, où est ta victoire? (1964) - Detrerrieux
- Anatomy of a Marriage: My Days with Jean-Marc (1964) - Fernand Aubry
- Anatomy of a Marriage: My Days with Françoise (1964) - Fernand Aubry
- The Lace Wars (1965) - Le sergent Bel-Oeil
- Le caïd de Champignol (1966) - Antoine
- The Gardener of Argenteuil (1966) - L'homme en robe de bure
- Maigret a Pigalle (1966) - L'ispettore Lognon
- The Stranger (1967) - L'avocat général
- How to Kill 400 Duponts (1967) - Serg. Saval
- A Little Virtuous (1968) - Marcel dit 'Lajoie' - l'homme du bar
- Under the Sign of the Bull (1969) - Vacher - le ferrailleur
- Mon oncle Benjamin (1969) - Le sergent
- Le Prussien (1971, TV Movie) - Victor
- Ursule et Grelu (1974) - Le capitaine
- Juliette and Juliette (1974) - M. Rozenec - le père d'une Juliettte
- Que la fête commence (1975) - Le maréchal de Villeroy
- The Porter from Maxim's (1976) - Le patron de chez Maxim's
- Nous maigrirons ensemble (1979) - Le producteur Blangenstein
