= Marie-José Nat =

French actress (1940–2019)

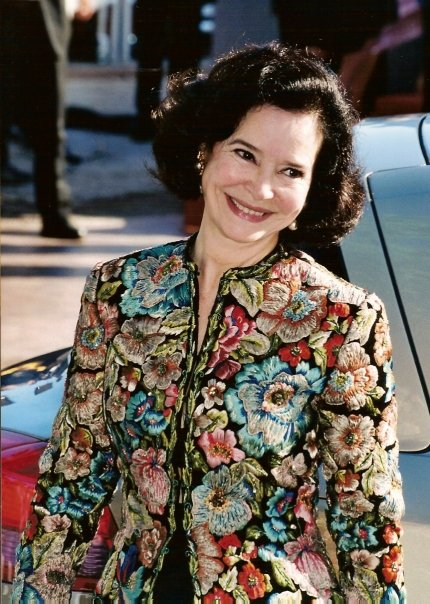
- Nat at the 55th Cannes Film Festival in May 2002
- Born: Marie-José Benhalassa; 22 April 1940; Bonifacio, Corsica, France
- Died: 10 October 2019 (aged 79); Paris, France
- Occupation: Actress
- Years active: 1956–2019
- Spouses: Roger Dumas (m. 1960; div. 1961) Michel Drach (m. 1964; div. 1981) Serge Rezvani (m. 2005)
- Children: 3

Marie-José Benhalassa (22 April 1940 – 10 October 2019), known professionally as Marie-José Nat, was a French actress. Among her notable works in cinema were the sequel films Anatomy of a Marriage: My Days with Jean-Marc and Anatomy of a Marriage: My Days with Françoise (1963), directed by André Cayatte. In 1974, she received a Cannes Film Festival Award for Best Actress for her performance in the film Violins at the Ball.

== Early life and family ==
Benhalassa was born in Bonifacio, Corse-du-Sud, to a Kabyle Berber father, Abdelkader Benhalassa, and a Corsican mother, Vincentine (Biancarelli).

In 1960, she married the actor Roger Dumas and divorced him in 1962. She then married French director Michel Drach with whom she had three sons, David, Julien and Aurélien. They divorced in 1981. She had a relationship of several years with the actor Victor Lanoux. On 30 September 2005 she married the painter, writer and songwriter Serge Rezvani in her third marriage.

She died in Paris of cancer at age 79.

=== Training ===
After secondary studies at the Ajaccio high school, Benhalassa entered the cours Simon in Paris.

=== Career ===
==== Marie-José Benhalassa ====
Benhalassa began her career as a cover-girl and haute-couture model. In 1955, she won a competition from the magazine Femmes d'aujourd'hui which allowed her to become Jean-Claude Pascal's partner in a photo comics entitled L'amour est un songe.

==== Marie-José Nat ====
Denys de La Patellière offered her her first major role in 1959 in Rue des prairies alongside Jean Gabin, in which she played his daughter. The following year, she performed in a comedy sketch by René Clair alongside Claude Rich and Yves Robert, and obtained a major role in La Vérité by Henri-Georges Clouzot, playing Brigitte Bardot's rival opposite Sami Frey.

In 1965, she married filmmaker Michel Drach; they had three children and divorced in 1981. She starred in several of her husband's films: Amelie or The Time to Love (1961), Elise, or Real Life (1970) and Les violons du bal (1974), inspired by his childhood experiences during World War II. She was also known for Train of Life (1998), Litan (1982) and The Dacians (1966) with Jean Sorel, Jean-Louis Trintignant, Victor Lanoux and Bernadette Lafont as acting partners.

In 2001, Nat was a member of the jury at the 36th Karlovy Vary International Film Festival in 2001, and at the 24th Cabourg Film Festival in 2010.

She was the first person to appear on the front cover of Télé 7 Jours in its current name on 26 March 1960.

== Awards and honours ==
Nat was awarded Best Actress at the 1974 Cannes Film Festival for her performance in Violins at the Ball, and the film was nominated for the Golden Palm award.

She was made a chevalier of the Légion d'honneur on 31 December 2004, chevalier of the Ordre national du Mérite on 18 November 2002 and promoted to the rank of officer on 14 November 2011, commandeur of the Ordre des Arts et des Lettres as a member of the conseil de l'ordre of which she was a member from 1 March 2001 until April 2012.

== Roles ==
=== Theatre ===
- 1958: Virage dangereux by John Boynton Priestley, directed by Raymond Rouleau, Théâtre Michel
- 1959: Blaise by Claude Magnier, directed by Jacques Mauclair, Théâtre des Nouveautés
- 1966: Médor by Roger Vitrac, directed by Maurice Jacquemont, with Bernard Noël, studio des Champs-Élysées
- 1984: Désiré by Sacha Guitry, directed by Jean-Claude Brialy, with Jean-Claude Brialy an Bernadette Lafont, Théâtre Édouard VII
- 1985: Voisin voisine after Jerome Chodorov directed by Pierre Mondy, with Victor Lanoux, Théâtre du Palais-Royal, then in 1986 at Théâtre Montansier
- 1990: Avec ou sans arbres by Jeannine Worms, directed by Albert-André Lheureux, with Henri Garcin, Théâtre Hébertot

=== Film ===
Among her notable works in cinema were the sequel films Anatomy of a Marriage: My Days with Jean-Marc and Anatomy of a Marriage: My Days with Françoise (1963), directed by André Cayatte.

- Crime and Punishment (1956) - La jeune fille du bal (uncredited)
- Women's Club (1956)
- Donnez-moi ma chance (1957) - Rosine
- Happy Arenas (1958) - Violette
- Vous n'avez rien à déclarer? (1959) - Lise
- Secret professionnel (1959) - Elvire
- Rue des prairies (1959) - Odette Neveux
- Vive le duc! (1960) - Cécile
- Love and the Frenchwoman (1960) - The bride (segment "Mariage, Le")
- The Truth (1960) - Annie Marceau
- The Menace (1961) - Josépha
- Amelie or The Time to Love (1961) - Amélie
- The Seven Deadly Sins (1962) - La jeune femme (segment "Colère, La")
- Sentimental Education (1962) - Anne Arnoux
- Anatomy of a Marriage: My Days with Jean-Marc (1964) - Françoise Dubreuil
- Anatomy of a Marriage: My Days with Françoise (1964) - Françoise Dubreuil
- La bonne occase (1965) - Béatrice
- A Woman in White (1965) - Claude Sauvage
- Dacii (1966) - Meda - Decebalus' Daughter
- Diamond Safari (1966) - Electre
- Mon amour, mon amour (1967) - Minor Role (uncredited)
- Le Paria (1969) - Lucia
- L'Opium et le Bâton (1969) - Farroudja
- Elise, or Real Life (1970) - Elise Le Tellier
- Embassy (1972) - Laure
- Kruiswegstraat 6 (1973) - Françoise Verbrugge
- Violins at the Ball (1974) - Elle (La femme et la mère de Michel) / Michel's wife
- Dis-moi que tu m'aimes (1974) - Charlotte Le Royer
- The Simple Past (1977) - Cécile
- La disubbidienza (1981) - Mrs. Manzi
- Anna (1981) - Anna
- Litan (1982) - Nora
- Black River (1991) - Mme Ginette
- Le nombril du monde (1993) - Oumi
- La nuit du destin (1997) - Mme Slimani
- Train of Life (1998) - Sura
- Colette, une femme libre (2004, TV Mini-Series) - Sido
- Le cadeau d'Elena (2004) - Elena

Nat also worked extensively in television series and dramas.
