= Julien Verdier =

- Born: 13 January 1910; Vanves, France
- Died: 15 July 1999 (aged 89); Dourdan, France
- Occupation: Actor
- Years active: 1949-1994

Julien Verdier (13 January 1910 – 15 July 1999) was a French actor. He appeared in more than one hundred films from 1949 to 1994.

== Filmography ==
Year	Title	Role	Notes
1949	Daybreak	Un mineur	
1952	We Are All Murderers	Bauchet	
1952	Trois femmes	Le père Boitelle	(segment "Zora")
1952	La jeune folle	Le garçon de café	
1953	The Call of Destiny	Dupont, le musicien	
1953	Follow That Man	Guy Couvoisier - le bijoutier	
1953	Jeunes mariés	Le gendarme	Uncredited
1954	Before the Deluge	Le veilleur de nuit	
1954	Leguignon guérisseur	Un mendiant	
1954	Huis clos	Le clochard	Uncredited
1955	Les chiffonniers d'Emmaüs	Bastien	
1955	Black Dossier		
1955	Le Couteau sous la gorge	Silios - le faux aveugle	
1956	The Wages of Sin	Le libraire	
1956	I'll Get Back to Kandara	Lachaume	
1957	Bonjour Toubib	Lacroix	
1957	Escapada		
1958	Tamango	Fernando	
1958	Police judiciaire		
1959	Les naufrageurs		
1960	Murder at 45 R.P.M.	L'aveugle	
1960	Dialogue of the Carmelites		Uncredited
1960	Boulevard	Jean Castagnier	
1961	Bernadette de Lourdes		
1961	La peau et les os	Buttiaux	
1962	Le monte-charge		
1963	Muriel	Le loueur de chevaux / The Stableman	
1964	Mort, où est ta victoire?		
1964	Anatomy of a Marriage: My Days with Jean-Marc	Un portier	
1964	Anatomy of a Marriage: My Days with Françoise	Un portier	Uncredited
1964	Weekend at Dunkirk	L'infirmier	
1965	Trap for Cinderella	L'employé du garage	
1966	The Upper Hand		
1967	Mise à sac	Lebuisson	
1967	L'authentique procès de Carl-Emmanuel Jung	Un témoin	
1970	The Bear and the Doll	Tabard	
1972	Beau Masque	Noblet	
1973	The Woman in Blue	Le garçon de café	
1974	Plaies et bosses	O'Neill	TV movie
1975	La soupe froide	Sacrovir	
1977	La Question	Président Rocher	
1977	At Night All Cats Are Crazy	Le sexagénaire	
1987	If the Sun Never Returns	Martin Métrailler	
1988	Une nuit à l'Assemblée Nationale	Le grand conseiller	
1990	Docteur Petiot	Le pharmacien	
