= Diamond Safari =

Diamond Safari may refer to:

- Diamond Safari (1958 film), an American film
- Diamond Safari (1966 film), a French film
