= Claire Etcherelli =

French novelist (1934–2023)

- Born: 11 January 1934; Bordeaux, France
- Died: 5 March 2023 (aged 89)
- Children: 2
- Writing career
- Language: French
- Genre: Novel
- Subject: Working-class women
- Notable work: Elise ou la vraie vie (Elise or the Real Life)
- Notable awards: Prix Femina, 1967

Claire Etcherelli (11 January 1934 – 5 March 2023) was a French novelist. She won the Prix Femina for her 1967 debut novel, Elise or the Real Life, which was also adapted into a 1970 film. Her main characters are women and the plots take place in real-life cities such as Paris. She was influenced by Honoré de Balzac.

== Early life ==
Claire Etcherelli was born in 1934 in Bordeaux. Her family was poor and her father died during World War II; her education was subsequently financed by the government and she earned a Baccalauréat qualification. Before turning to writing, Etcherelli was employed in many types of workplaces, including a car assembly plant, a ball-bearing manufacturer, and a tourist agency. In 1975 she began working as editorial secretary for the journal Les Temps modernes.

== Works ==
Etcherelli published her first novel, Elise ou la vraie vie (Elise or the Real Life), in 1967. It was turned down by five publishers before being accepted by Éditions Denoël. The novel is based around the relationship of an Algerian automobile worker and a white French woman in the 1950s. It also deals with the issues that those of less privilege face such as poverty, exploitation, and social marginalization. Literary critic Liz Heron said of the novel, "Etcherelli's novel is significant because it describes the tensions and contradictions that make Paris life real for Elise, Etcherelli's heroine".

Etcherelli won the Prix Femina in 1967 for this novel. The novel gained a cult following during the 1960s and 1970s. In 1970, it was adapted into a film directed by Michel Drach.

Etcherelli's second novel, A Propos de Clémence (About Clémence) (1971), is about "the difficulty of knowing oneself and the impossibility of knowing another person". Her third novel, Un Arbre voyageur (A Travelling Tree) (1978), focuses on two women who attempt to start an unconventional family that has no patriarch. The family was to be based on trust, solidarity, and women's leadership. Etcherelli said the novel "gave her the most pleasure to write". A review of the book in An Encyclopedia of Continental Women Writers, Volume 1 says that it "offers us a beautiful, penetrating account of the lives of ordinary, though shrewdly intelligent and inconspicuously sensitive women of France's late sixties and early seventies". Etcherelli later wrote a 1982 compilation of poetic texts, titled Delirante (Delirious Woman).

== Writing style ==
Etcherelli's main characters are women from a working-class background. She cites Honoré de Balzac as a major influence on her work. Cities and places that exist within those cities are frequently used in her work, with the cities creating a metaphor for the aspects of life.

== Personal life and death ==
Etcherelli was the mother of two sons. She died on 5 March 2023, at the age of 89.

== Bibliography ==
- Elise ou la vraie vie (Elise, or the Real Life, 1967)
- A Propos de Clémence (About Clémence, 1971)
- Un Arbre voyageur (A Travelling Tree, 1978)
- Delirante (Delirious Woman, 1982)
