= Maurice Jarre =

French composer (1924–2009)

- Born: Maurice-Alexis Jarre; 13 September 1924; Lyon, France
- Died: 28 March 2009 (aged 84); Los Angeles, California, U.S.
- Education: University of Paris; Conservatoire de Paris
- Years active: 1958–2001
- Spouses: France Pejot (m. 1946; div. 1964) Dany Saval (m. 1965; div. 1967) Laura Devon (m. 1967; div. 1984) Fui Fong Khong (m. 1984)
- Children: 3, including Jean-Michel and Kevin
- Musical career
- Genres: Film score; contemporary classical
- Occupations: Composer; conductor
- Works: See below

Maurice-Alexis Jarre (French: [mɔʁis alɛksi ʒaʁ]; 13 September 1924 – 28 March 2009) was a French composer and conductor, mainly of film scores. He was particularly known for his collaborations with film director David Lean, composing the scores to all of his films from 1962 to 1984. He received numerous accolades over the course of his career, including three Academy Awards, three BAFTA Awards, four Golden Globes, and a Grammy Award.

Jarre won three Academy Awards for Best Original Score for the David Lean films Lawrence of Arabia (1962), Doctor Zhivago (1965), and A Passage to India (1984). He was Oscar-nominated for Sundays and Cybèle (1962), The Message (1976), Witness (1985), Gorillas in the Mist (1988), and Ghost (1990). Notable scores also include Eyes Without a Face (1959), The Longest Day (1962), The Train (1964), The Collector (1965), Grand Prix (1966), The Man Who Would Be King (1975), The Year of Living Dangerously (1982), Fatal Attraction (1987), and Dead Poets Society (1989). He worked with such directors as Alfred Hitchcock, Elia Kazan, John Huston, Luchino Visconti, John Frankenheimer, and Peter Weir.

Three of his compositions spent a total of 42 weeks on the UK singles chart. The biggest hit was "Somewhere My Love" (to his tune "Lara's Theme", with lyrics by Paul Francis Webster) performed by the Mike Sammes Singers, which reached Number 14 in 1966 and spent 38 weeks on the chart.

Jarre was the father of musician Jean-Michel Jarre and the adoptive father of screenwriter Kevin Jarre.

== Early life and education ==
Maurice-Alexis Jarre was born on 13 September 1924 in Lyon, France, the son of Gabrielle Renée (née Boullu) and André Jarre, a radio technical director.

He first enrolled in the engineering school at the Sorbonne, but decided to pursue music courses instead. He left the Sorbonne against his father's will and enrolled at the Conservatoire de Paris to study composition and harmony and chose percussion as his major instrument.

He became director of the Théâtre National Populaire and recorded his first film score in France in 1951. He wrote the score for Toute la mémoire du monde by Alain Resnais. In 1954, his radio opera, Ruisselle, won the Prix Italia for musical works in Perugia.

== Film scoring ==
In 1961, Jarre's music career experienced a major change when American film producer Sam Spiegel asked him to write the score for the 1962 epic Lawrence of Arabia, directed by David Lean. The acclaimed score won Jarre his first Academy Award and he would go on to compose the scores to all of Lean's subsequent films. He followed with The Train (1964) and Grand Prix (1966), both for director John Frankenheimer, and in between had another great success in David Lean's Doctor Zhivago, which included the lyricless tune "Lara's Theme" (later the tune for the song "Somewhere My Love"), and which earned him his second Oscar. He worked with Alfred Hitchcock on Topaz (1969): although Hitchcock's experiences with the film were unhappy, he was satisfied with Jarre's score, telling him, "I have not given you a great film, but you have given me a great score."

Jarre's score for David Lean's Ryan's Daughter (1970), set in Ireland, completely eschews traditional Irish music styles, according to Lean's preferences. The song "It Was a Good Time" from Ryan's Daughter went on to be recorded by musical stars such as Liza Minnelli, who used it in her critically acclaimed television special Liza with a Z, as well as by others during the 1970s. He contributed the music for Luchino Visconti's The Damned (1969), and John Huston's The Man Who Would Be King (1975).

He was again nominated for an Academy Award for scoring The Message in 1976, for the director and producer Moustapha Akkad. He followed with Witness (1985) and Dead Poets Society (1989), for which he won a British Academy Award.

In the 1970s and 1980s, Jarre turned his hand to science fiction, with scores for The Island at the Top of the World (1974), Dreamscape (1984), Enemy Mine (1985), and Mad Max Beyond Thunderdome (1985). The last is written for full orchestra, augmented by a chorus, four grand pianos, a pipe organ, digeridoo, fujara, a battery of exotic percussion, and three ondes Martenot, which feature in several of Jarre's other scores, including Lawrence of Arabia, Jesus of Nazareth, The Bride and Prancer. The balalaika features prominently in Jarre's score for Doctor Zhivago.

In 1990, Jarre was again nominated for an Academy Award, scoring the supernatural love story/thriller Ghost. His music for the final scene of the film is based on "Unchained Melody" composed by fellow film composer Alex North. Other films for which he provided the music include A Walk in the Clouds (1995), for which he wrote the score and all of the songs, including the romantic "Mariachi Serenade". Also to his credit is the passionate love theme from Fatal Attraction (1987), and the moody electronic soundscapes of After Dark, My Sweet (1990). He was well respected by other composers including John Williams, who stated, on Jarre's death, "(He) is to be well remembered for his lasting contribution to film music ... we all have been enriched by his legacy."

Jarre's television work includes the theme for the short-lived 1967 Western series on CBS, Cimarron Strip, his score for the miniseries Jesus of Nazareth (1977), directed by Franco Zeffirelli, Shōgun (1980), and the theme for PBS's Great Performances.

Jarre scored his last project in 2001, a television mini-series about the Holocaust titled Uprising.

He was "one of the giants of 20th-century film music" who was "among the most sought-after composers in the movie industry" and "a creator of both subtle underscoring and grand, sweeping themes, not only writing for conventional orchestras ... but also experimenting with electronic sounds later in his career".

== Style and artistry ==
Jarre wrote mainly for orchestras, but began to favour synthesized music in the 1980s. Jarre pointed out that his electronic score for Witness was actually more laborious, time-consuming and expensive to produce than an orchestral score. Jarre's electronic scores from the 1980s also include Fatal Attraction, The Year of Living Dangerously, Firefox and No Way Out. A number of his scores from that era also feature electronic / acoustic blends, such as Gorillas in the Mist, Dead Poets Society, The Mosquito Coast and Jacob's Ladder.

== Personal life ==
=== Marriages and family ===
Jarre was married four times, the first three marriages ending in divorce. In the 1940s, his marriage to Francette Pejot, a French Resistance member and concentration camp survivor, produced a son, Jean-Michel Jarre, a French composer, performer, and music producer, who is one of the pioneers in electronic music. When Jean-Michel was five years old, Maurice split up with his wife and moved to the United States, leaving Jean-Michel with his mother in France.

In 1965, Jarre married French actress Dany Saval; together they had a daughter, Stephanie Jarre. He next married American actress Laura Devon (1967–1984), resulting in his adopting her son, Kevin Jarre, a screenwriter, with credits on such films as Tombstone and Glory (1989). From 1984 to his death, he was married to Fui Fong Khong.

=== Death ===
Jarre died of cancer on 28 March 2009 in Los Angeles.

== Filmography ==
=== Film ===
Year	Title	Director	Notes
1957	Burning Fuse	Henri Decoin	Composed with Louis Gasté & Philippe Gérard
1958	Head Against the Wall	Georges Franju	
1959	Les Dragueurs	Jean-Pierre Mocky	
1959	Beast at Bay	Pierre Chenal	
1959	Stars at Noon	Jacques Ertaud; Marcel Ichac	
1959	Vous n'avez rien à déclarer?	Clément Duhour	
1959	Eyes Without a Face	Georges Franju	
1960	La main chaude	Gérard Oury	
1960	Lovers on a Tightrope	Jean-Charles Dudrumet	
1960	Crack in the Mirror	Richard Fleischer	
1960	Recourse in Grace	László Benedek	
1961	The President	Henri Verneuil	
1961	Spotlight on a Murderer	Georges Franju	
1961	The Big Gamble	Richard Fleischer	
1961	Three Faces of Sin	François Villiers	
1961	Famous Love Affairs	Michel Boisrond	
1962	Les oliviers de la justice	James Blue	
1962	Sun in Your Eyes	Jacques Bourdon	
1962	Thérèse Desqueyroux	Georges Franju	
1962	The Longest Day	Ken Annakin; Andrew Marton; Bernhard Wicki	
1962	Sundays and Cybele	Serge Bourguignon	
1962	L'oiseau de paradis	Marcel Camus	
1962	Lawrence of Arabia	David Lean	
1962	To Die in Madrid	Frédéric Rossif	
1963	A King Without Distraction	François Leterrier	
1963	Judex	Georges Franju	
1964	Mort, où est ta victoire?	Hervé Bromberger	
1964	Behold a Pale Horse	Fred Zinnemann	
1964	The Train	John Frankenheimer	
1964	Weekend at Dunkirk	Henri Verneuil	
1965	The Collector	William Wyler	
1965	Doctor Zhivago	David Lean	
1966	The Professionals	Richard Brooks	
1966	Is Paris Burning?	René Clément	
1966	Gambit	Ronald Neame	
1966	Grand Prix	John Frankenheimer	
1967	The Night of the Generals	Anatole Litvak	
1967	The 25th Hour	Henri Verneuil	Composed with Georges Delerue
1968	Villa Rides	Buzz Kulik	
1968	5 Card Stud	Henry Hathaway	
1968	The Fixer	John Frankenheimer	
1968	Isadora	Karel Reisz	
1969	The Extraordinary Seaman	John Frankenheimer	
1969	The Damned	Luchino Visconti	
1969	Topaz	Alfred Hitchcock	
1970	The Only Game in Town	George Stevens	
1970	El Condor	John Guillermin	
1970	Ryan's Daughter	David Lean	
1971	Plaza Suite	Arthur Hiller	
1971	Red Sun	Terence Young	
1971	A Season in Hell	Nelo Risi	
1972	Pope Joan	Michael Anderson	
1972	The Life and Times of Judge Roy Bean	John Huston	
1972	The Effect of Gamma Rays on Man-in-the-Moon Marigolds	Paul Newman	
1973	Ash Wednesday	Larry Peerce	
1973	The Mackintosh Man	John Huston	
1974	The Island at the Top of the World	Robert Stevenson	
1975	Mandingo	Richard Fleischer	Composed with Muddy Waters
1975	Posse	Kirk Douglas	
1975	The Man Who Would Be King	John Huston	
1975	Mr. Sycamore	Pancho Kohner	
1976	Shout at the Devil	Peter R. Hunt	
1976	The Last Tycoon	Elia Kazan	
1976	The Message	Moustapha Akkad	
1977	The Prince and the Pauper	Richard Fleischer	
1977	March or Die	Dick Richards	
1978	Like a Turtle on Its Back	Luc Béraud	
1978	Two Solitudes	Lionel Chetwynd	
1979	The Tin Drum	Volker Schlöndorff	
1979	Winter Kills	William Richert	
1979	The Magician of Lublin	Menahem Golan	
1979	The American Success Company	William Richert	
1980	The Black Marble	Harold Becker	
1980	The Last Flight of Noah's Ark	Charles Jarrott	
1980	Resurrection	Daniel Petrie	
1980	Lion of the Desert	Moustapha Akkad	
1981	Chu Chu and the Philly Flash	David Lowell Rich	Composed with Pete Rugolo
1981	Circle of Deceit	Volker Schlöndorff	
1981	Taps	Harold Becker	
1982	Don't Cry, It's Only Thunder	Peter Werner	
1982	Firefox	Clint Eastwood	
1982	Young Doctors in Love	Garry Marshall	
1982	The Year of Living Dangerously	Peter Weir	
1983	For Those I Loved	Robert Enrico	
1984	Top Secret!	Jim Abrahams; David Zucker; Jerry Zucker	
1984	Dreamscape	Joseph Ruben	
1984	A Passage to India	David Lean	
1985	Witness	Peter Weir	
1985	Mad Max Beyond Thunderdome	George Miller; George Ogilvie	Mad Max themes by Brian May
1985	The Bride	Franc Roddam	
1985	Enemy Mine	Wolfgang Petersen	
1986	Tai-Pan	Daryl Duke	
1986	The Mosquito Coast	Peter Weir	
1986	Solarbabies	Alan Johnson	
1987	Tokyo Blackout	Toshio Masuda	
1987	No Way Out	Roger Donaldson	
1987	Julia and Julia	Peter Del Monte	
1987	Gaby: A True Story	Luis Mandoki	
1987	Fatal Attraction	Adrian Lyne	
1988	Distant Thunder	Rick Rosenthal	
1988	Wildfire	Zalman King	
1988	Moon over Parador	Paul Mazursky	
1988	Gorillas in the Mist	Michael Apted	
1988	Le palanquin des larmes	Jacques Dorfmann	
1988	Cocktail	Roger Donaldson	Rejected score; replaced by J. Peter Robinson
1989	Chances Are	Emile Ardolino	
1989	Dead Poets Society	Peter Weir	
1989	Prancer	John D. Hancock	
1989	Enemies, A Love Story	Paul Mazursky	
1990	Solar Crisis	Richard C. Sarafian	
1990	Ghost	Jerry Zucker	
1990	Jacob's Ladder	Adrian Lyne	
1990	Almost an Angel	John Cornell	
1990	After Dark, My Sweet	James Foley (director)	
1991	Only the Lonely	Chris Columbus	
1991	Fires Within	Gillian Armstrong	
1992	The Setting Sun	Rou Tomono	
1992	School Ties	Robert Mandel	
1992	Shadow of the Wolf	Jacques Dorfmann; Pierre Magny	
1993	Mr. Jones	Mike Figgis	
1993	Fearless	Peter Weir	
1994	The River Wild	Curtis Hanson	Rejected score; replaced by Jerry Goldsmith
1995	A Walk in the Clouds	Alfonso Arau	
1996	The Sunchaser	Michael Cimino	
1996	White Squall	Ridley Scott	Rejected score; replaced by Jeff Rona & Hans Zimmer
1997	Day and Night	Bernard-Henri Lévy	
1999	Sunshine	István Szabó	
2000	I Dreamed of Africa	Hugh Hudson	

=== Television ===
Year	Title	Notes
1974	Great Expectations	Television film
1975	The Silence	Television film
1977	Jesus of Nazareth	Miniseries
1978	Ishi: The Last of His Tribe	Television film
1978	The Users	Television film
1978	Mourning Becomes Electra	Television film
1980	Shōgun	Miniseries; 5 episodes
1980	Enola Gay	Television film
1982	Coming Out of the Ice	Television film
1984	Samson and Delilah	Television film
1986	Apology	Television film
1988	The Murder of Mary Phagan	Miniseries; 2 episodes
2001	Uprising	Television film

== Awards and nominations ==
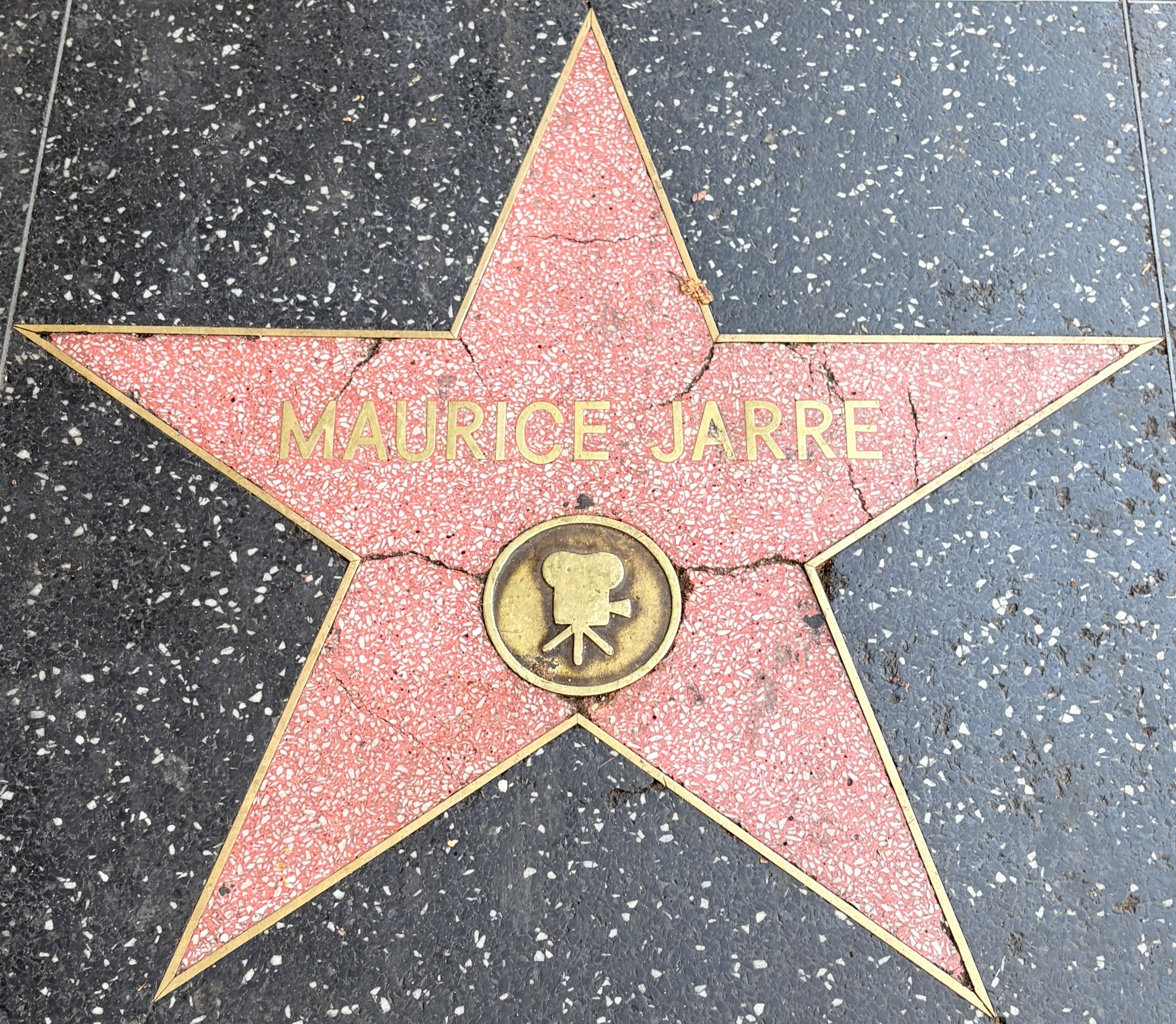
Hollywood Walk of Fame star

Jarre received three Academy Awards and received a total of nine nominations, eight for Best Original Score and one for Best Original Song. He also won four Golden Globes and was nominated for ten. The American Film Institute ranked Jarre's score for Lawrence of Arabia number three on their list of the greatest film scores. His scores for the following films were also nominated for the list: Doctor Zhivago (1965), A Passage to India (1984), and Ryan's Daughter (1970). Numerous additional awards include ASCAP's Lifetime Achievement Award in 1993. He received a star on the Hollywood Walk of Fame.

Award	Year	Category	Project	Result	Ref.
Academy Award	1962	Best Original Score	Lawrence of Arabia	Won	
Academy Award	1963	Best Original Score	Sundays and Cybele	Nominated	
Academy Award	1965	Best Original Score	Doctor Zhivago	Won	
Academy Award	1972	Best Original Song	The Life and Times of Judge Roy Bean ("Marmalade, Molasses & Honey")	Nominated	
Academy Award	1976	Best Original Score	The Message	Nominated	
Academy Award	1984	Best Original Score	A Passage to India	Won	
Academy Award	1985	Best Original Score	Witness	Nominated	
Academy Award	1988	Best Original Score	Gorillas in the Mist	Nominated	
Academy Award	1990	Best Original Score	Ghost	Nominated	
British Academy Film Award	1985	Best Film Music	A Passage to India	Nominated	
British Academy Film Award	1985	Best Film Music	Witness	Won	
British Academy Film Award	1989	Best Film Music	Dead Poets Society	Won	
Golden Globe Award	1962	Best Original Score	Lawrence of Arabia	Nominated	
Golden Globe Award	1965	Best Original Score	Doctor Zhivago	Won	
Golden Globe Award	1966	Best Original Score	Is Paris Burning?	Nominated	
Golden Globe Award	1973	Best Original Score	The Life and Times of Judge Roy Bean	Nominated	
Golden Globe Award	1975	Best Original Score	The Man Who Would Be King	Nominated	
Golden Globe Award	1984	Best Original Score	A Passage to India	Won	
Golden Globe Award	1985	Best Original Score	Witness	Nominated	
Golden Globe Award	1986	Best Original Score	The Mosquito Coast	Nominated	
Golden Globe Award	1988	Best Original Score	Gorillas in the Mist	Won	
Golden Globe Award	1995	Best Original Score	A Walk in the Clouds	Won	
Golden Globe Award	1999	Best Original Score	Sunshine	Nominated	
Grammy Award	1962	Best Score Soundtrack for Visual Media	Lawrence of Arabia	Nominated	
Grammy Award	1965	Best Score Soundtrack for Visual Media	Doctor Zhivago	Won	
Grammy Award	1970	Best Score Soundtrack for Visual Media	Ryan's Daughter	Nominated	
Grammy Award	1984	Best Score Soundtrack for Visual Media	A Passage to India	Nominated	
Grammy Award	1985	Best Score Soundtrack for Visual Media	Witness	Nominated	
Grammy Award	1987	Best Score Soundtrack for Visual Media	Fatal Attraction	Nominated	
Saturn Award	1980	Best Music	Resurrection	Nominated	
Saturn Award	1985	Best Music	The Bride	Nominated	
Saturn Award	1990	Best Music	Ghost	Nominated	
