= Jacques Charrier =

French actor and artist (1936–2025)

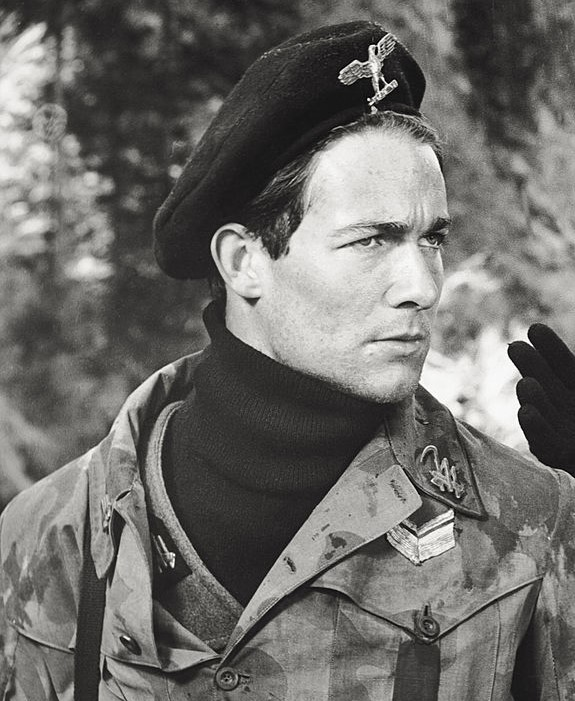
- Charrier in Tiro al piccione (1961)
- Born: 6 November 1936; Metz, Moselle, France
- Died: 3 September 2025 (aged 88); Saint-Malo, France
- Occupations: Actor; film producer; painter; ceramist
- Spouses: Brigitte Bardot (m. 1959; div. 1962) France Louis-Dreyfus (m. 1964; div. 1967) Linda Charrier (m. 1982, divorced) Makiko Kumano (m. 2009)
- Children: 4

Jacques Charrier (6 November 1936 – 3 September 2025) was a French actor, film producer, painter and ceramist.

== Early life and career ==
Charrier was born in Metz in 1936. His father, Joseph Jules Léon Charrier, was a career military officer. His mother was Marie Marguerite (née Vullaume) Charrier.

He first studied pottery at the École supérieure des arts décoratifs de Strasbourg. After several years, he moved to Paris to study at the Conservatoire national supérieur d'art dramatique.

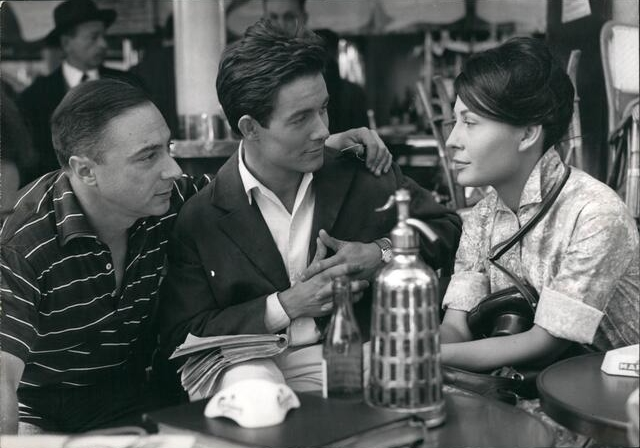
Director Gérard Oury and the actors Charrier (middle) and Franca Bettoia, during the filming of his film La Main chaude in Italy, 1959

In 1980 he returned to the School of Fine Arts, and went back to painting that was full of references to his two passions, travel and antiquity. His art work has been regularly exhibited in Paris, Geneva and San Francisco. With the publication of the memoirs of Brigitte Bardot, he found himself in the media spotlight. He sued for "violation of privacy", and was successful.

== Personal life and death ==
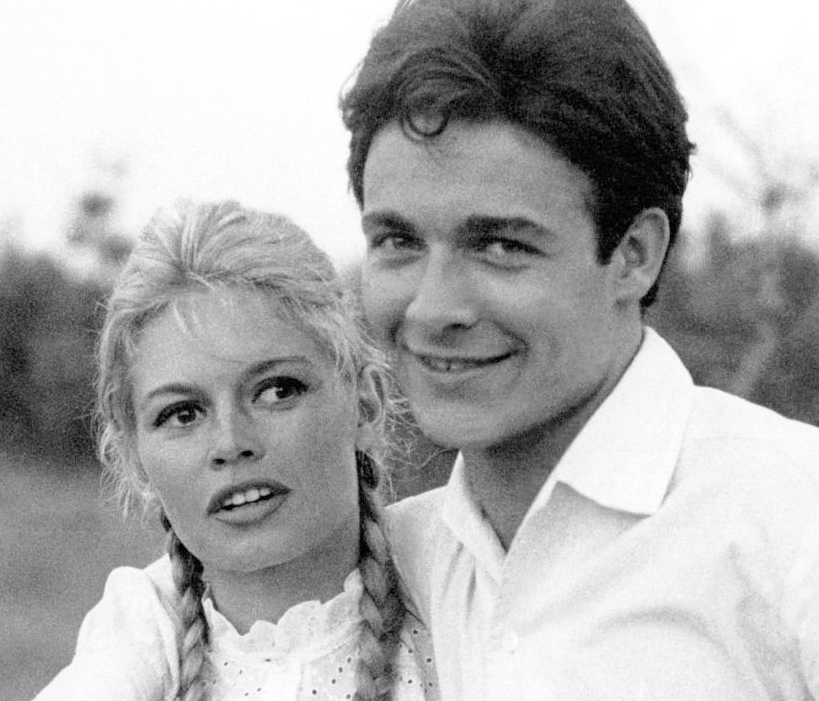
Charrier and first wife Brigitte Bardot in 1960

In 1959, he married Brigitte Bardot; they had a son, Nicolas-Jacques (born on January 11, 1960). Nicolas-Jacques himself is the father of two daughters, Anna-Camilla and Théa-Joséphine, born in 1985 and 1990. Bardot and Charrier divorced in 1962. In 1964, he married France Louis-Dreyfus, of the Louis-Dreyfus family, with whom he had two daughters, Marie and Sophie, before divorcing in 1967. In 1982, he met his third wife Linda with whom he had one daughter. From 2009 until his death, he was married to Japanese artist Makiko Kumano.

Charrier died on 3 September 2025, at the age of 88, in Saint-Malo, near where he had lived for 13 years.

== Selected filmography ==
Film
Year	Title	Role	Notes
1958	Young Sinners	Bob	
1959	Les Dragueurs	Freddy	
1959	Babette Goes to War	Lt. Gérard de Crécy-Lozère	
1960	La Main chaude	Michel	
1961	Tiro al piccione	Marco Laudato	
1962	The Eye of Evil	Albin Mercier	
1962	Carmen di Trastevere	Antonio Lizzani	
1963	À cause, à cause d'une femme	Remy Fertet	
1964	Anatomy of a Marriage: My Days with Françoise	Jean-Marc Dubreuil	
1964	Anatomy of a Marriage: My Days with Jean-Marc	Jean-Marc Dubreuil	
1966	Marie Soleil	Axel	
1966	Living It Up	Jean-Loup Costa	
1967	The Oldest Profession	Nick / John Demetrius	
1967	An Evening in Paris	French man	Hindi Movie
