= Raymond Froment =

French film producer

- Born: 17 January 1913; Lion-sur-Mer, Lower Normandy, France
- Died: 10 April 1990 (aged 77); Ouistreham, Lower Normandy, France
- Occupation: Producer
- Years active: 1949-1974 (film)

Raymond Froment (1913–1990) was a French film producer.

== Selected filmography ==
- Singoalla (1949)
- My Seal and Them (1951)
- Full House (1952)
- House of Ricordi (1954)
- The Heroes Are Tired (1955)
- Typhoon Over Nagasaki (1957)
- Last Year at Marienbad (1961)
- The Day and the Hour (1963)
- Anatomy of a Marriage: My Days with Françoise (1964)
- Anatomy of a Marriage: My Days with Jean-Marc (1964)
- Champagne for Savages (1964)
- Un monde nouveau (1966)
- The Uninhibited (1965)
- Nuits Rouges (1974)

== Bibliography ==
- Tim Palmer & Charlie Michael. Directory of World Cinema: France. Intellect Books, 2013.
