= Roger Fellous =

French cinematographer (1919–2006)

- Born: 4 January 1919; Paris, France
- Died: 4 February 2006 (aged 87); Issy-les-Moulineaux, France
- Occupation: Cinematographer
- Years active: 1938–1994 (film & TV)

Roger Fellous (1919–2006) was a French cinematographer. He worked frequently over several decades after beginning his career as a Camera operator before the Second World War.

== Selected filmography ==
- A Hole in the Wall (1950)
- Bongolo (1952)
- Midnight Witness (1953)
- Women Without Hope (1954)
- Tourments (1954)
- The Hotshot (1955)
- Eighteen Hour Stopover (1955)
- The Adventures of Gil Blas (1956)
- Les Lavandières du Portugal (1957)
- Every Day Has Its Secret (1958)
- Julie the Redhead (1959)
- L'eau a la bouche (1960)
- Napoleon II, the Eagle (1961)
- Two Are Guilty (1963)
- Stop Train 349 (1963)
- The Threepenny Opera (1963)
- Anatomy of a Marriage: My Days with Françoise (1964)
- Anatomy of a Marriage: My Days with Jean-Marc (1964)
- Diary of a Chambermaid (1964)
- Code Name: Jaguar (1965)
- Treasure Island (1966)
- The Blood Rose (1970)
- White Fire (1984)
- Dark Mission: Flowers of Evil (1988)

== Bibliography ==
- Durgnat, Raymond. Luis Bunuel. University of California Press, 1968.
- Neupert, Richard. A History of the French New Wave Cinema. University of Wisconsin Press, 2007.
