= Amelie or The Time to Love =

1961 film

- Film poster
- Directed by: Michel Drach
- Written by: Michel Drach; Michele Angot
- Starring: Marie-José Nat; Jean Sorel
- Cinematography: Jean Tournier
- Edited by: Geneviève Winding
- Release dates: June 1961 (Berlin); 2 September 1963 (France)
- Running time: 110 minutes
- Country: France
- Language: French

Amelie or The Time to Love (French: Amélie ou le Temps d'aimer) is a 1961 French drama film directed by Michel Drach. It was entered into the 11th Berlin International Film Festival.

== Cast ==
- Marie-José Nat - Amélie
- Jean Sorel - Alain
- Clotilde Joano - Fanny
- Roger Van Mullem - Monsieur Boule
- Pascale de Boysson - La servante des Boule
- Francis Dumoulino - Monsieur Carnal
- Martine Vatel - La servante des Rueil
- Monique Le Porrier - Clara
- Sacha Briquet - Hubert
- Jean Babilée - Pierre
- Louise de Vilmorin - Loyse
- Sophie Daumier - Emmannuelle
