= Young Sinners (1958 film) =

- Directed by: Marcel Carné
- Screenplay by: Marcel Carné; Charles Spaak; Jacques Sigurd
- Produced by: Robert Dorfmann
- Starring: Pascale Petit
- Cinematography: Claude Renoir
- Edited by: Albert Jurgenson
- Music by: Oscar Peterson
- Distributed by: Les Films Corona
- Release date: 1958
- Running time: 120 minutes
- Countries: France; Italy
- Language: French

Young Sinners (French: Les tricheurs, Italian: Peccatori in blue-jeans) is a 1958 French-Italian film directed by Marcel Carné.

Jean Paul Belmondo appears in one of his earliest roles.

The movie was a massive box office hit in France, with admissions of 4,953,600.

== Cast ==
- Pascale Petit as Mic
- Andréa Parisy as Clo
- Jacques Charrier as Bob Letellier
- Laurent Terzieff as Alain
- Jean-Paul Belmondo as Lou
- Dany Saval as Nicole
- Jacques Portet as Guy
- Pierre Brice as Bernard
- Alfonso Mathis as Peter
- Roland Armontel as Surgeon
- Jacques Marin as Félix
- Roland Lesaffre as Roger
- Claude Giraud as Toni

== Reception ==
The film was the fifth biggest hit of the year in France. It was the biggest film of the year in Switzerland.
