= Diamond Safari (1966 film) =

- Directed by: Michel Drach
- Written by: Michel Drach; Albert Kantof
- Produced by: Hans Oppenheimer
- Starring: Marie-José Nat; Jean-Louis Trintignant; Horst Frank
- Cinematography: Andréas Winding
- Edited by: Geneviève Winding
- Music by: Ward Swingle
- Production companies: Chronos Films; Hans Oppenheimer Film; Port Royal Films
- Distributed by: Compagnie Française de Distribution Cinématographique; Team-Film
- Release date: 18 June 1966
- Running time: 92 minutes
- Countries: France; West Germany
- Language: French

Diamond Safari (French: Safari diamants, German: Für eine Handvoll Diamanten) is a 1966 French-West German thriller film directed by Michel Drach and starring Marie-José Nat, Jean-Louis Trintignant and Horst Frank. A young man becomes involved with a gang of diamond-smugglers.

== Cast ==
- Marie-José Nat as Electre
- Jean-Louis Trintignant as Raphaële Vincente
- Horst Frank as Fédérico
- Hellmut Lange as Robert Alphène
- Jean-Pierre Kalfon as Éric
- Jean-Pierre Darras as Pascal Moratti
- Frédéric de Pasquale as Le routier
- Lucienne Bogaert as La vieille dame sur le banc
- Paul Le Person as Joseph
