= The Wings of the Dove (1981 film) =

1981 film

- Film poster
- Directed by: Benoît Jacquot
- Written by: Benoît Jacquot
- Produced by: Maurice Bernart
- Starring: Isabelle Huppert
- Cinematography: Ennio Guarnieri
- Edited by: Dominique Auvray
- Music by: Laurent Petitgand; Philippe Sarde
- Distributed by: Gaumont Distribution
- Release date: 6 May 1981
- Running time: 95 minutes
- Country: France
- Language: French

The Wings of the Dove (French: Les Ailes de la colombe) is a 1981 French drama film directed by Benoît Jacquot and starring Isabelle Huppert. The film was adapted from the 1902 novel of the same name by Henry James.

== Cast ==
- Isabelle Huppert as Marie
- Dominique Sanda as Catherine Croy
- Michele Placido as Sandro
- Loleh Bellon as Suzanne Berger
- Françoise Christophe as La mère de Marc
- Gérard Falconetti as Marc
- Veronica Lazar
- Paul Le Person as Le père de Catherine
- Danilo Mattei
- Odile Michel as La soeur de Catherine
- Jean Sorel as Lukirsh
