= An Eye for an Eye (1957 film) =

1957 film

- Directed by: André Cayatte
- Written by: André Cayatte; Vahé Katcha
- Based on: An Eye for an Eye by Vahé Katcha
- Produced by: André Halley des Fontaines
- Starring: Curd Jürgens; Folco Lulli; Lea Padovani
- Cinematography: Christian Matras
- Edited by: Paul Cayatte
- Music by: Louiguy
- Production companies: Galatea Film; Jolly Film; Union Générale Cinématographique
- Distributed by: UGC Distribution
- Release date: 8 September 1957
- Running time: 113 minutes
- Countries: France; Italy
- Language: French

An Eye for an Eye (French: Oeil pour oeil) is a 1957 French-Italian Technicolor thriller film directed by André Cayatte and starring Curd Jürgens, Folco Lulli and Lea Padovani. It is based on the 1955 novel of the same title by Vahé Katcha. It was shot at the Victorine Studios in Nice and on location around Almería in Spain. The film's sets were designed by the art director Jacques Colombier. It was entered into the 1957 Venice Film Festival.

== Cast ==
- Curd Jürgens as Dr. Walter
- Folco Lulli as Bortak
- Lea Padovani as Lola Zardi
- Héléna Manson as Mme Laurier
- Robert Porte as Le docteur Matik
- Marlène Chicheportiche as La fille de Bortak
- Darío Moreno as Le cafetier de Toluma
- Mohamed Ziani as Le peintre
- Pascal Mazzotti as Le barman
- Georges Douking as Le guérisseur
- Micheline Gary as La femme de l'automobiliste
- Doudou Babet as L'employé du téléphérique
- Jean Hébey as L'automobiliste
- René Havard as L'interne
- Pascale Audret as La belle-soeur de Bortak
- Paul Frankeur as L'opéré
- Enrico Glori as Zardi

== Bibliography ==
- Chiti, Roberto & Poppi, Roberto. Dizionario del cinema italiano: Dal 1945 al 1959. Gremese Editore, 1991.
- Quinlan, David . Quinlan's Film Directors. Batsford, 1999.
