= Elise, or Real Life =

1970 film

- Directed by: Michel Drach
- Written by: Michel Drach; Claire Etcherelli; Claude Lanzmann
- Starring: Marie-José Nat
- Cinematography: Claude Zidi
- Edited by: Carlos de los Llanos
- Release date: 25 November 1970
- Running time: 104 minutes
- Country: France
- Language: French

Elise, or Real Life (French: Élise ou la vraie vie) is a 1970 French drama film directed by Michel Drach. It was entered into the 1970 Cannes Film Festival.

== Cast ==
- Marie-José Nat as Elise Le Tellier
- Mohamed Chouikh as Arezki
- Bernadette Lafont as Anna
- Jean-Pierre Bisson as Lucien Le Tellier
- Catherine Allégret as Didi
- Mustapha Chadly as Mustapha
- Alice Reichen as La grand-mère
- Martine Chevallier as Marie-Louise, the sister-in-law
- Jean-Pierre Darras as Le commissaire
- Yves Barsacq as Un policier
