= The Simple Past (film) =

1977 film

- Directed by: Michel Drach
- Written by: Michel Drach; Pierre Uytterhoeven; Dominique Saint-Alban
- Produced by: Michel Drach
- Starring: Marie-José Nat; Victor Lanoux
- Cinematography: Étienne Szabo
- Edited by: Françoise Bonnot
- Music by: Jacques Monty; Jean-Louis d' Onorio
- Production company: Port Royal Films
- Distributed by: Gaumont Distribution
- Release date: 10 August 1977
- Running time: 96 min.
- Language: French
- Box office: $7,898,107

The Simple Past or Le passé simple is a 1977 French drama film directed by Michel Drach.

== Plot ==
Cécile has just had a terrible car accident. Her husband François got to the hospital while she is still in a coma. When she wakes up, she does not recognize Francois and forgot all the circumstances of the accident.

== Cast ==
- Marie-José Nat as Cécile
- Victor Lanoux as François
- Anne Lonnberg as Josepha
- Vania Vilers as Bruno
- Roland Blanche as The Renter
- Marc Eyraud as Doctor Mercier

== Accolades ==
Award	Category	Recipient	Result
César Award	César Award for Best Editing	Françoise Bonnot	Nominated
Karlovy Vary International Film Festival	Best Actress	Marie-José Nat	Won
