= Violins at the Ball =

1974 film

- Film poster
- Directed by: Michel Drach
- Written by: Michel Drach
- Starring: Jean-Louis Trintignant
- Cinematography: William Lubtchansky
- Release date: 20 February 1974
- Running time: 110 minutes
- Country: France
- Language: French

Violins at the Ball (French: Les Violons du bal) is a 1974 French drama film directed by Michel Drach. It was entered into the 1974 Cannes Film Festival where Marie-José Nat won the award for Best Actress.

== Cast ==
- Jean-Louis Trintignant – Lui (Michel)
- Marie-José Nat – Elle (La femme et la mère de Michel) / Michel's wife
- Gabrielle Doulcet – La grand-mère
- David Drach – L'enfant
- Nathalie Roussel – La soeur de Michel / Michel's Sister
- Christian Rist – Le frère de Michel et le contestataire / Michel's Brother
- Yves Afonso – Le cameraman
- Yvon Yak – Le premier producteur
- Noëlle Leiris – La comtesse
- Luce Fabiole – La boulangère
- Malvina Penne – La réfugiée rousse
- Paul Le Person – Le premier passeur
- Guy Saint-Jean – Le second passeur
- François Leccia – Le jeune passeur
- Guido Alberti – Le producteur italien
- Hella Petri – La femme du producteur
