= Germinal (1963 film) =

- Directed by: Yves Allégret
- Written by: Charles Spaak
- Based on: Germinal by Emile Zola
- Starring: Jean Sorel
- Cinematography: Jean Bourgoin
- Edited by: Henri Rust
- Music by: Michel Magne, orchestra under the direction of Jean Gitton
- Production companies: Les Films Marceau, Cocinor, Paris Elysées Film, Metzger et Woog (Paris); Laetitia Film (Rome), in collaboration with Hungaro Films et Hunnia Films (Budapest)
- Distributed by: Cocinor
- Release date: September 18, 1963
- Running time: 112 minutes
- Countries: France; Italy; Hungary
- Language: French

Germinal is a 1963 French language French-Italian-Hungarian film directed by Yves Allégret. It is an adaptation of the 1885 novel Germinal by Emile Zola.

== Plot ==
The year is 1863. Étienne Lantier gets work as a mineworker after having been fired from his job on the railroad for revolutionary behavior. Disheartened by the conditions in the mines, he returns to his revolutionary ideas and leads a strike of the mineworkers. Soldiers are brought in to quell the strike.

== Cast ==
- Jean Sorel as Étienne Lantier, a new young miner
- Berthe Granval as Catherine Maheu, a young woman
- Claude Brasseur as Marcel (or Martin) Chaval, a miner in love with Catherine
- Bernard Blier as Hennebeau, the owner of a mineshaft
- Claude Cerval as Victor Maigrat, a businessman
- Philippe Lemaire as Henri Negrel, an engineer
- Jacqueline Porel as Mme Maigrat
- Lea Padovani as La Maheude
- Pierre Destailles as Raseneur, an innkeeper
- Paulette Dubost as Rose, Hennebeau's servant
- Gabrielle Dorziat as Cécile's grandmother
- Simone Valère as Madame Clotilde Hennebeau
- Jacques Monod as Deneulin
- Michèle Cordoue as Désir, a widow
- Sándor Pécsi as Maheu, a miner
- Gábor Koncz as Souvarine, a revolutionary
- Marianne Krencsey as la Mouquette
- Zoltán Makláry as Bonnemort, an old miner
- René Lefèvre-Bel as Félix, Hennebeau's butler

== See also ==
- Germinal (1913)
- Germinal (1993)
