= The Big Gamble (1961 film) =

1961 film by Richard Fleischer

- Theatrical release poster
- Directed by: Richard Fleischer
- Screenplay by: Irwin Shaw
- Produced by: Darryl F. Zanuck
- Starring: Stephen Boyd; Juliette Gréco; David Wayne
- Cinematography: William C. Mellor
- Edited by: Roger Dwyre
- Music by: Maurice Jarre
- Distributed by: 20th Century-Fox
- Release date: July 1961
- Running time: 100 minutes
- Country: United States
- Language: English

The Big Gamble is a 1961 American adventure film directed by Richard Fleischer. It stars Stephen Boyd and Juliette Gréco.

== Plot ==
Vic Brennan is a sailor from Dublin who decides to use his family's fortune and move to Africa to open a truck-hauling business. He is accompanied by his wife, Marie, and a meek cousin, Samuel, who loses their documents, causing customs agents to seize some of their cargo.

As they proceed along the Ivory Coast, a plan occurs to Vic to purchase 300 cases of beer and deliver it to thirsty natives for sale. A German they encounter along the way, Kaltenberg, attempts to hijack it.

A feverish Samuel needs to be nursed back to health. He bravely dives into a raging river to save Vic from drowning. Their misfortune continues when the truck's brakes fail, causing it to race dangerously down a cliff road. Just as all seems lost, though, they safely reach their final destination.

== Cast ==
- Stephen Boyd as Vic Brennan
- Juliette Gréco as Marie Brennan
- David Wayne as Samuel Brennan
- Gregory Ratoff as Kaltenberg
- Sybil Thorndike as Aunt Cathleen
- Fernand Ledoux as Customs Official
- Marie Kean as Cynthia
- Harold Goldblatt as The Priest
- J. G. Devlin as The Driving Instructor
- Philip O'Flynn as John Brennan
- Fergal Stanley as Davey Brennan
- Jess Hahn as Ferguson
- Alain Saury as Lieutenant Francois
- Jacques Marin as Hotel Clerk

== Reception ==
Bosley Crowther of The New York Times wrote the movie doesn't work "despite the vigor and desperation that the tireless director, Richard Fleischer, has got the actors to display. Once we have found that Gregory Ratoff, in the role of the drunken German guide, is a sneak in a comedy character's get-up, there is no more flavor or hope. Not even the volcanic Miss Gréco can maintain her inner smoldering fire. There's some good stuff early along, however. There's that wonderful trip through the surf from the side of an offshore freighter. And there's a delightful meeting along a jungle road with a band of gaily dressed natives who trade some heavy wood-chopping for some cases of beer."
