= Le Miroir à deux faces =

- Directed by: André Cayatte
- Written by: André Cayatte; Gérard Oury dialogue: Jean Meckert; Denis Perret
- Produced by: Henry Deutschmeister; Alain Poiré; Robert Sussfeld (executive producer)
- Starring: Michèle Morgan; Bourvil; Ivan Desny
- Cinematography: Christian Matras
- Edited by: Paul Cayatte
- Music by: Louiguy
- Production companies: CEI Incom; Franco London Films; Paris Union Films; Société Nouvelle des Établissements Gaumont (SNEG)
- Distributed by: Société des Etablissements L. Gaumont
- Release date: 15 October 1958
- Running time: 98 minutes
- Countries: France; Italy
- Language: French

Le Miroir à deux faces is a 1958 French drama film directed by André Cayatte who co-wrote screenplay with Gérard Oury, Jean Meckert and Denis Perret. The film stars Michèle Morgan, Bourvil and Ivan Desny. It was called The Mirror Has Two Faces in English, but this is not the literal translation; the word is à ("with") not a ("has"), and so would be better translated as The Two-Sided Mirror.

The film was loosely remade in the U.S. as The Mirror Has Two Faces (1996) adapted by Richard LaGravenese, and starring Barbra Streisand and Jeff Bridges.

== Synopsis ==
Pierre Tardivet, a professor, marries Marie-José Vauzange, a sensitive and intelligent girl who is physically unattractive. Tardivet soon begins to treat Marie-José cruelly, making her life very unpleasant and joyless. Two children are born from the marriage. Tardivet is injured in a car accident and is tended to by Dr. Bosc, a famous plastic surgeon. Bosc operates on Marie-José as well and transforms her into a beautiful woman. Tardivet then begins to treat her even more cruelly. He becomes embittered and hateful towards Marie-José because her changed appearance makes him think she is no longer his. Marie-José and her sister's husband, Gérard Durieu, want to elope and restart their lives, but they are stopped when Tardivet kills Dr. Bosc. This dramatic act recalls Marie-José to her duties as a wife and mother, and she renounces her happiness to tend to her husband and children.

== Cast ==
- Michèle Morgan - Marie-José
- Bourvil - Tardivet
- Ivan Desny - Gérard
- Elizabeth Manet - Véronique
- Gérard Oury - Dr. Bosc
- Sandra Milo - Ariane
- Georgette Anys - Mme. Benoit
- Julien Carette - M. Benoit
- Georges Chamarat - M. Vauzanges
- Jane Marken - Mme. Vauzanges
- Sylvie - Mme. Tardivet

== Critical reception ==
Time Out wrote: "Interesting to re-view this in the light of the Streisand 'remake', though any resemblance are so superficial as to appear coincidental," and added that "Cayatte shows his customary relish for the unpleasant: the nightmare honeymoon in Venice is richly detailed and Sylvie sketches in the quietly venomous mother-in-law with her usual economy. If Streisand's film was quintessential '90s Hollywood feel good, this is equally characteristic '50s French astringency." TV Guide commented: "The filmmakers do a fine job of delving into the problems people face when a fairy tale-like transformation takes place, though the film suffers from an over-analysis of the situation. Also, Morgan is too glamorous to pull off the type of physical transformation that occurs."
