= Emily Will Know =

1949 novel

- First edition
- Author: Nancy Rutledge
- Language: English
- Genre: Crime
- Publisher: Doubleday
- Publication date: 1949
- Publication place: United States
- Media type: Print

Emily Will Know is a 1949 crime novel by the American writer Nancy Rutledge. It had previously appeared in the Saturday Evening Post in a shorter version under the title Murder for Millions. It was published in France the following year.

== Film adaptation ==
In 1956 it was adapted into the French film noir The Wages of Sin directed by Denys de La Patellière and starring Danielle Darrieux, Jean-Claude Pascal and Jeanne Moreau.

== Bibliography ==
- Gray, Marianne. La Moreau: A Biography of Jeanne Moreau. Donald I. Fine Books, 1996.
- Nehr, Ellen. Doubleday Crime Club Compendium, 1928-1991. Offspring Press, 1992.
- Walker-Morrison, Deborah. Classic French Noir: Gender and the Cinema of Fatal Desire. Bloomsbury Publishing, 2020.
