= Tiro al piccione =

1961 film

- Directed by: Giuliano Montaldo
- Written by: Luciano Martino; Giuliano Montaldo; Fabrizio Onofri
- Produced by: Tonino Cervi
- Starring: Jacques Charrier; Eleonora Rossi Drago; Francisco Rabal; Sergio Fantoni; Carlo D'Angelo
- Cinematography: Carlo Di Palma
- Edited by: Nino Baragli
- Music by: Carlo Rustichelli
- Release date: 1961
- Country: Italy

Pigeon Shoot or Pigeon Shooting (Italian: Tiro al piccione) is a 1961 Italian war drama film. It represents the directorial debut film of Giuliano Montaldo.

The film entered the competition at Venice Film Festival in 1961.

== Cast ==
- Jacques Charrier as Marco Laudato
- Eleonora Rossi Drago as Anna
- Gastone Moschin as Pasquini
- Francisco Rabal as Elia
- Franco Balducci as Garrani
- Loris Bazzocchi as Giuliani
- Enzo Cerusico as Pastorello
- Franca Nuti as Donna col marito al fronte
- Enrico Glori as Oratore fascista
- Sergio Fantoni as Nardi
- Carlo D'Angelo as Mattei
