= The Anodin Family =

1956 film

- Directed by: Claude Autant-Lara
- Written by: Marcel Aymé; Jean Aurenche
- Produced by: ORTF
- Starring: Alfred Adam; Louis de Funès
- Music by: René Cloërec
- Release date: 6 July 1956
- Running time: 45 minutes
- Country: France
- Language: French

The Anodin Family French: La Famille Anodin, is a French TV serial, in 8 episodes of 45 minutes, from 1956, on RTF. Directed by Claude Autant-Lara and written by Marcel Aymé and Jean Aurenche.

== Cast ==
- Alfred Adam
- Claude Albers
- Blanchette Brunoy
- Jean-Pierre Cassel
- Colette Castel
- Yvonne Clech
- Pierre Dac
- Louis de Funès
- Pierre Destailles
- Jacques Fayet
- Christiane Fédora
- Anna Gaylor
- Mona Goya
- Jacques Hilling
- Jacqueline Jefford
- Margo Lion
- Yves-Marie Maurin
- François Nocher
- Jean Parédès
- Alain Quercy
- Henri Vilbert
