= The Wages of Sin (1956 film) =

1956 film

- Directed by: Denys de La Patellière
- Written by: Roland Laudenbach; Denys de La Patellière
- Based on: Emily Will Know by Nancy Rutledge
- Produced by: Roger Ribadeau-Dumas; Roger Richebé
- Starring: Danielle Darrieux; Jean-Claude Pascal; Jeanne Moreau
- Cinematography: Henri Alekan
- Edited by: Monique Isnardon; Robert Isnardon
- Music by: Maurice Leroux
- Production companies: Films Roger Richebé; Société Française de Cinématographie
- Distributed by: Films Roger Richebé
- Release date: 20 April 1956
- Running time: 110 minutes
- Country: France
- Language: French

The Wages of Sin (French: Le salaire du péché) is a 1956 French drama film directed by Denys de La Patellière and starring Danielle Darrieux, Jean-Claude Pascal and Jeanne Moreau. A film noir, it was adapted from the 1949 novel Emily Will Know by the American crime writer Nancy Rutledge It was shot at the Photosonor Studios in Paris. The film's sets were designed by the art director Paul-Louis Boutié.

== Synopsis ==
In La Rochelle Jean, an ambitious journalist, marries Isabelle the daughter of a wealthy shipowner but finds her cut out any inheritance. Later when he has discovered that she has been secretly added back into her father's will, he dreams about killing him and scares the old man into a heart attack. The only witness to the crime is the shipowner's nurse Angele who he seduces and now becomes his lover and accomplice, plotting to kill Isabelle so that they can claim the inheritance.

== Cast ==
- Danielle Darrieux as Isabelle Lindstrom
- Jean-Claude Pascal as Jean de Charvin
- Jeanne Moreau as Angèle Ribot
- Jean Debucourt as Frank Lindstrom
- Marcel Bozzuffi as un marin présidant aux obsèques
- Michel Etcheverry as Docteur Maroual
- Jean Lanier as Le pasteur
- Christian Lude as Benoît
- Julien Verdier as Le libraire
- Georges Chamarat as Le médecin
- Pierre Morin as M. Logan, le signataire

== Bibliography ==
- Walker-Morrison, Deborah. Classic French Noir: Gender and the Cinema of Fatal Desire. Bloomsbury Publishing, 2020.
