= Paul Cayatte =

French film editor

- Born: 5 March 1919; Carcassonne, Aude, France
- Died: 8 October 1983 (aged 64); Férolles-Attilly, Seine-et-Marne, France
- Occupation: Film editor
- Years active: 1952–1978 (film)

Paul Cayatte (1919–1983) was a French film editor. He was active in French cinema from the 1950s to the 1970s. He was the younger brother of the film director André Cayatte. His first film was the 1952 crime film We Are All Murderers, directed by his brother.

== Selected filmography ==
- We Are All Murderers (1952)
- The Night Is Ours (1953)
- A Woman's Treasure (1953)
- Rhine Virgin (1953)
- Before the Deluge (1954)
- Black Dossier (1955)
- Blood to the Head (1956)
- Pity for the Vamps (1956)
- An Eye for an Eye (1957)
- Le Miroir à deux faces (1958)
- Business (1960)
- The Old Guard (1960)
- The Gigolo (1960)
- Daniella by Night (1961)
- Two Are Guilty (1963)
- Anatomy of a Marriage: My Days with Françoise (1964)
- Anatomy of a Marriage: My Days with Jean-Marc (1964)
- Trap for Cinderella (1965)
- Un monde nouveau (1966)
- Diabolically Yours (1967)
- La Piscine (1969)
- Cran d'arrêt (1970)
- Borsalino (1970)
- Easy, Down There! (1971)
- La isla misteriosa y el capitán Nemo (1973)

== Bibliography ==
- Biggs, Melissa E. French films, 1945-1993: a critical filmography of the 400 most important releases. McFarland & Company, 1996.
- Crisp, Colin. French Cinema—A Critical Filmography: Volume 2, 1940–1958. Indiana University Press, 2015.
- Orpen, Valerie. Film Editing: The Art of the Expressive. Columbia University Press, 2019.
