= Paul Le Person =

- Born: 10 February 1931; Argenteuil, France
- Died: 8 August 2005 (aged 74); Paris, France

Paul Le Person (10 February 1931 – 8 August 2005) was a French actor. He appeared in more than ninety films from 1963 to 2005.

== Filmography ==
Film
Year	Title	Role	Notes
1966	A Matter of Resistance	Roger	Uncredited
1966	A Man and a Woman	Garage Man	
1966	Diamond Safari	Joseph	
1967	The Thief of Paris	Roger Voisin dit Roger-La-Honte	
1967	Un idiot à Paris	Jean-Marie Laprune	Uncredited
1967	Mise à sac	Stéphane	
1968	Alexandre le bienheureux	Sanguin	
1968	The Return of Monte Cristo	Bertuccio	
1970	The Crook	Le faussaire	
1970	Mont-Dragon	Gaston	
1971	On est toujours trop bon avec les femmes	Gallagher	
1972	Les malheurs d'Alfred	Le policier pointilleux à la déposition	
1972	Un cave	Le commissaire Taillant	
1972	The Tall Blond Man with One Black Shoe	Perrache	
1973	The Train	Le commissaire	
1974	Violins at the Ball	Le premier passeur	
1974	The Phantom of Liberty	Le père Gabriel / Monk	
1974	The Return of the Tall Blond Man with One Black Shoe	Perrache	
1975	Chobizenesse	Armand Boussenard	
1979	Coup de tête	Lozerand	
1980	The Horse of Pride	Gourgon, le facteur	
1981	The Wings of the Dove	Le père de Catherine	
1981	Neige	Bruno Vallès	
1982	Jamais avant le mariage	Raymond	
1984	The Judge	Le président Lebau	
1984	The Twin	Le clochard jazz	
1985	Monsieur de Pourceaugnac	Le second médecin	
1986	Douce France	Frédéric's Grandfather	
1990	L'Autrichienne	Simon	
1990	Lacenaire	Vigouroux	
1991	Blanc d'ébène	Le commandant Dubois	
1991	La Dernière Saison	Louis	
1996	Bernie	Bernie, the janitor	
1999	The Creator	Le Floch	
2001	The Officers' Ward	Adrien's grandfather	
2002	Les jours où je n'existe pas	Vieil homme à l'enterrement	
2004	Vipère au poing	Le père Létendard	
2005	Tête de gondole	Gégé - Jehovah	(segment "Liaison")

TV
Year	Title	Role	Notes
1978	Médecins de nuit		
2003	Joséphine, ange gardien	Glorion	TV Series (1 Episode : "Le Compteur à zéro")
