= The Menace (1961 film) =

- Theatrical release poster
- Directed by: Gérard Oury
- Written by: Gérard Oury; Danièle Thompson
- Produced by: Roger de Broin
- Starring: Robert Hossein; Marie-José Nat
- Cinematography: André Villard
- Edited by: Geneviève Vaury
- Music by: André Hossein
- Distributed by: Gaumont Distribution
- Release date: 1 March 1961
- Running time: 80 minutes
- Countries: France; Italy
- Language: French

The Menace (French: La menace) is a 1961 French-Italian drama film directed by Gérard Oury.

== Cast ==
- Robert Hossein - Savary
- Marie-José Nat - Josépha
- Paolo Stoppa - Cousin
- Robert Dalban - L'inspecteur
- André Cellier - Le commissaire
- Gérard Oury - Le docteur
- Elsa Martinelli - Lucile
- Alice Sapritch - La cliente
