= We Are All Murderers =

1952 film

- Directed by: André Cayatte
- Written by: André Cayatte; Charles Spaak
- Produced by: François Carron
- Starring: Marcel Mouloudji; Raymond Pellegrin; Claude Laydu
- Cinematography: Jean Bourgoin
- Edited by: Paul Cayatte
- Music by: Raymond Legrand
- Production companies: Union Générale Cinématographique; Jolly Film; Labor Film Produzione
- Distributed by: L'Alliance Générale de Distribution Cinématographique
- Release date: 21 May 1952
- Running time: 115 minutes
- Countries: France; Italy
- Language: French

We Are All Murderers (French: Nous sommes tous des assassins, Italian: Siamo tutti assassini) is a 1952 French-Italian crime drama film written and directed by André Cayatte and starring Marcel Mouloudji, Raymond Pellegrin and Claude Laydu. It was shot at the Boulogne Studios in Paris. The film's sets were designed by the art director Jacques Colombier. It tells the story of René, a young man from the slums, trained by the French Resistance in World War II to kill Germans. He continues to kill long after the war has ended, as it is all he knows. It was entered into the 1952 Cannes Film Festival and won the Special Jury Prize.

== Plot ==
René Le Guen (Marcel Mouloudji) is a former resistance fighter trained as a young man as a professional killer. After World War II, he has no qualms in applying these skills and is arrested for murder. Convicted and condemned to death, he is held in a prison cell with other murderers sentenced to death. Men to be guillotined are taken out at night, so they wait in fear and only sleep after dawn. While Le Guen's lawyer (Claude Laydu) tries to achieve a pardon for his client, three of Le Guen's fellow inmates are executed, one by one, in the course of the film.

Cayatte used his films to reveal the inequities and injustice of the French system, and protested against capital punishment.

== Cast ==
- Marcel Mouloudji as René Le Guen
- Raymond Pellegrin as Gino Bollini
- Antoine Balpêtré as Dr. Albert Dutoit
- Amedeo Nazzari as Docteur Detouche (Italian version)
- Jean-Pierre Grenier as Docteur Detouche (French version)
- Julien Verdier as Bauchet
- Claude Laydu as Philippe Arnaud
- Juliette Faber as Francine Saulnier
- Georges Poujouly as Michel Le Guen
- Jacqueline Pierreux as Yvonne Le Guen (French version)
- Yvonne Sanson as Yvonne Le Guen (Italian version)
- Lucien Nat as The Attorney General
- Louis Arbessier as the young court lawyer
- René Blancard as Albert Pichon
- Léonce Corne as the instructor colonel
- Henri Crémieux as Bauchet's lawyer
- Jean Daurand as Girard, the man in the telephone booth
- Yvonne de Bray as the ragpicker
- Guy Decomble as an inspector
- Liliane Maigné as Rachel
- Anouk Ferjac as Agnès
- Paul Frankeur as Léon
- Line Noro as Madame Arnaud
- Marcel Pérès as Malingré
- Renée Gardès as Mother Le Guen

== Bibliography ==
- Crisp, Colin. French Cinema—A Critical Filmography: Volume 2, 1940–1958. Indiana University Press, 2015.
- Hutton Margaret-Anne. French Crime Fiction, 1945–2005: Investigating World War II. Routledge, 2016.
