= The Oldest Profession =

1967 film

- Film poster
- Directed by: Claude Autant-Lara; Mauro Bolognini; Philippe de Broca; Jean-Luc Godard; Franco Indovina; Michael Pfleghar
- Written by: Jean Aurenche; Daniel Boulanger; Ennio Flaiano; Jean-Luc Godard; Klaus Munro; André Tabet; Georges Tabet
- Produced by: Joseph Bercholz; Horst Wendlandt
- Edited by: Nino Baragli; Agnès Guillemot
- Production companies: Rialto Films (Germany); Films Gibs (France)
- Release date: 21 April 1967
- Running time: 119 minutes
- Country: France; Germany
- Language: French

The Oldest Profession (French: Le Plus Vieux Métier du monde) is a 1967 internationally co-produced comedy film. It features contributions from six different film directors, each one doing a segment on prostitution through the ages.

== Plot ==
- The Prehistoric Era (Franco Indovina) – The cavewoman Brit is unable to attract a visiting trader until the wall painter Rak has the idea of making up her face.
- Roman Nights (Mauro Bolognini) – In ancient Rome, the Emperor Flavius makes an excuse to leave the Empress Domitilla and go with the poet Menippus to a brothel. There he meets a mysterious and beautiful woman who turns out to be his wife, the Empress.
- Mademoiselle Mimi (Philippe de Broca) – During the French Revolution, Philibert asks to visit Mimi and from her window watches an old aristocrat being guillotined, saying it was his childless uncle. Promising to pay her as soon as the lawyers have settled the estate, he disappears.
- The Gay Nineties (Michael Pfleghar) – In Paris in the 1890s, Nini goes to bed with a lonely old man and, looking through his wallet once he is asleep, finds he is a partner in a major bank. Refusing to take any money, she says she is in love with him and in the end lets him marry her.
- Paris Today (Claude Autant-Lara) – Catherine, who has lost her driving licence, works from a car driven by her friend Nadia. When the car is impounded, they buy an ambulance instead. One night it is stopped by police, who depart when they discover that the client is a doctor.
- Anticipation (Jean-Luc Godard) – In the future, a man from a remote space outpost visits Earth and at the spaceport hotel is offered a prostitute for the night. He rejects the girl, Marlène, as she is incapable of conversation. His hosts then find him another girl, Eléonore, who is full of charm and chat, but reluctant to go further. He persuades her that the mouth she uses so well could have further uses.

== Cast ==
Raquel Welch was the only American in the cast.

Prehistoric Era (directed by Franco Indovina)

- Michèle Mercier as Brit
- Enrico Maria Salerno as Rak
- Gabriele Tinti as the trader (as Gabriel Tinti)

Roman Nights (directed by Mauro Bolognini)

- Elsa Martinelli as Domitilla
- Gastone Moschin as Flavius
- Giancarlo Cobelli as Menippus

Mademoiselle Mimi (directed by Phillipe de Broca)

- Jeanne Moreau as Mimi
- Jean-Claude Brialy as Philibert
- Jean Richard as Mimi's previous client
- Jacques Monod as a man in the street

The Gay Nineties (directed by Michael Pfleghar)

- Raquel Welch as Nini
- Martin Held as Édouard
- Tilly Lauenstein as another prostitute
- Siegfried Schürenberg as another banker

Paris Today (directed by Claude Autant-Lara)

- Nadia Gray as Nadia
- France Anglade as Catherine
- Jacques Duby as a cop
- Francis Blanche as the doctor
- Marcel Dalio as the lawyer Vladimir Leskov

Anticipation (directed by Jean-Luc Godard)

- Jacques Charrier as John Demetrios
- Anna Karina as Eléonore Roméovitch
- Marilù Tolo as Marlène

== Release ==
The rights to distribute the film in the US and English-speaking Canada were purchased by Jack Harris. Harris later wrote in his memoirs he was attracted by the chance to work on "a brand new film, produced like a major Hollywood picture, featuring Raquel Welch and some of the hottest female stars in the world... It was a big disappointment as a theatrical entry. However through the years, between theatres, television and home video, it has never lost is popularity and has treated me very well."

The Los Angeles Times thought the film was "ruined by some of the worst dubbing in recent memory".
