= Before the Deluge =

1954 film

Before the Deluge (French film)
- Directed by: André Cayatte
- Written by: André Cayatte; Charles Spaak
- Produced by: François Carron
- Starring: Antoine Balpêtré
- Cinematography: Jean Bourgoin
- Edited by: Paul Cayatte
- Music by: Georges Van Parys
- Production companies: Union Générale Cinématographique; Documento Film
- Distributed by: L'Alliance Générale de Distribution Cinématographique
- Release date: 26 February 1954
- Running time: 138 minutes
- Countries: France; Italy
- Language: French

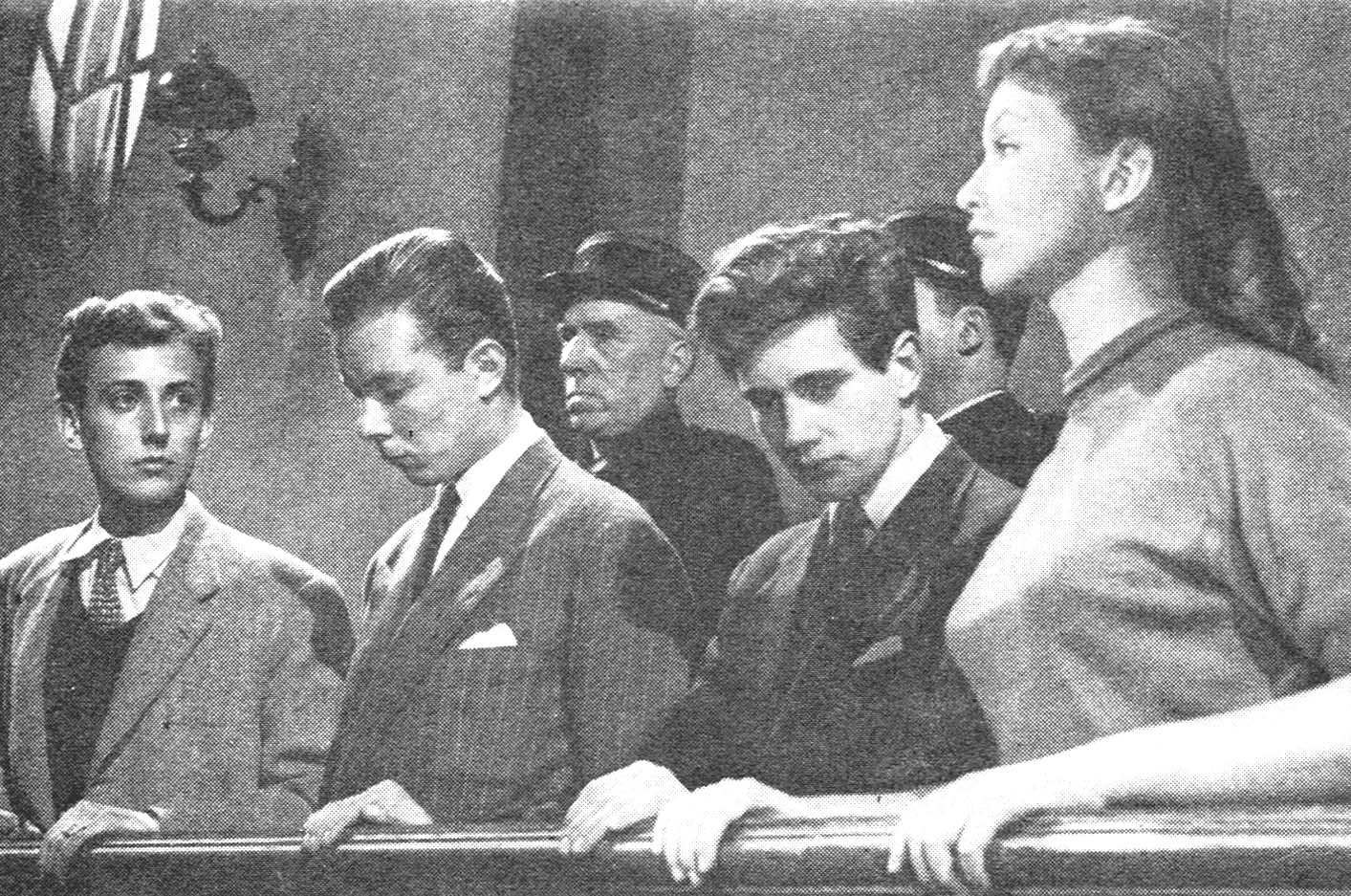
Scene from the film, l.t.r.: Jacques Fayet, Clément Thierry, Jacques Chabassol and Marina Vlady.

Before the Deluge (French: Avant le déluge) is a 1954 French-Italian drama film directed by André Cayatte. It was entered into the 1954 Cannes Film Festival. It was shot at the Billancourt Studios in Paris. The film's sets were designed by the art director Jacques Colombier.

== Plot ==
Four boys and a girl want to get away from their parents and their country because they are afraid of an atomic war. They plan to use a boat to get to an idyllic island. When they realise their savings are not sufficient they feel it was justified to obtain the required money by committing a crime.

== Cast ==
- Antoine Balpêtré as Monsieur Albert Dutoit (as Balpetre)
- Paul Bisciglia as Jean-Jacques Noblet
- Bernard Blier as Monsieur Marcel Noblet
- Jacques Castelot as Serge de Montesson
- Jacques Chabassol as Jean Arnaud
- Clément Thierry as Philippe Boussard (as Clement-Thierry)
- Roger Coggio as Daniel Epstein
- Léonce Corne as Commissaire Auvain (as Leonce Corne)
- Jacques Fayet as Richard Dutoit
- Paul Frankeur as Monsieur Boussard
- Isa Miranda as Madame Françoise Boussard
- Carlo Ninchi as the presiding judge
- Line Noro as Madame Arnaud (as Line Noro de la Comédie Française)
- Marcel Pérès as Inspecteur Mallingré (as Marcel Peres)
- Albert Rémy as waiter at the café (as Albert Remy)
- Delia Scala as Josette
- André Valmy as the second police inspecteur (as Andre Valmy)
- Julien Verdier as the night watchman
- Marina Vlady as Liliane Noblet
- Maria Zanoli as Madame Dutoit (as Maria Emma Zanolli)
