= Jean Sorel =

French actor (born 1934)

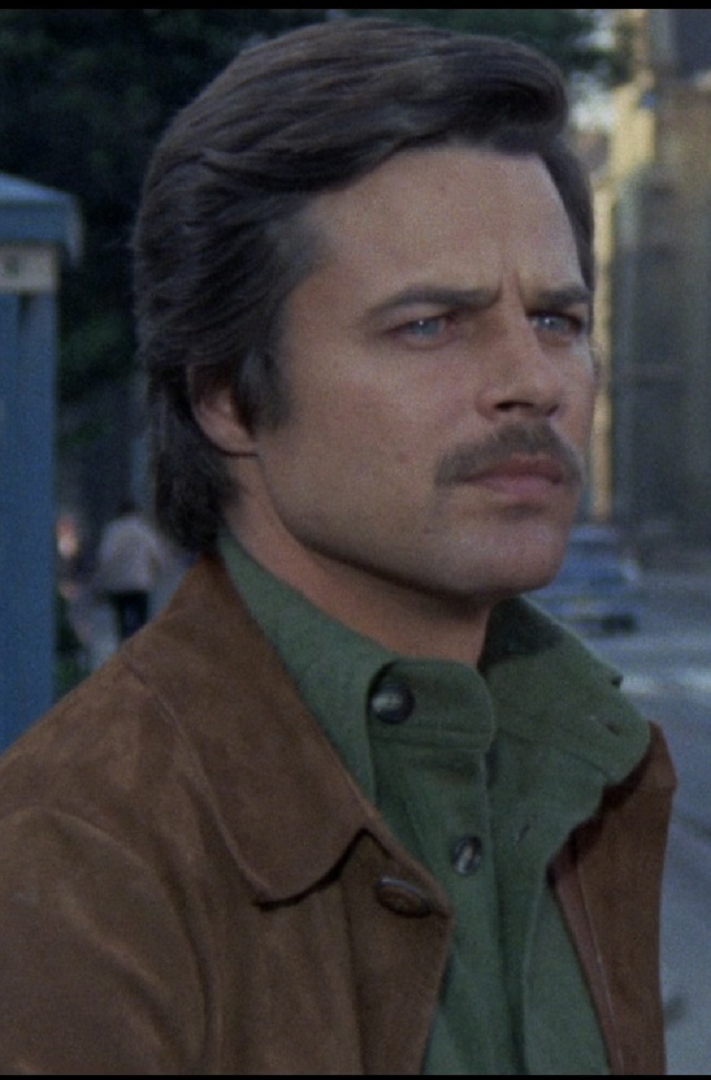
- Sorel in Short Night of Glass Dolls (1971)
- Born: Jean Bernard Antoine de Chieusses de Combaud de Roquebrune; 25 September 1934 (age 91); Marseille, France
- Education: École normale supérieure
- Occupation: Actor
- Years active: 1959–present
- Spouses: Anna Maria Ferrero (m. 1962; died 2018) Patricia Balme (m. 2018)
- Relatives: François de Menthon (uncle)

Jean Bernard Antoine de Chieusses de Combaud de Roquebrune CAL (born 25 September 1934), known professionally as Jean Sorel (French pronunciation: [ʒɑ̃ sɔʁɛl]), is a French actor. He was a leading man of European cinema during the 1960s and '70s, with a screen persona that often drew comparisons with Alain Delon.

== Biography ==
=== Early life and family ===
Sorel was born Jean Bernard Antoine de Chieusses de Combaud de Roquebrune in Marseille. His family was descended from the House of Capet. His father, Guy (Guillaume) de Combaud de Roquebrune, was a newspaper publisher and a member of the French Resistance who was killed in combat during World War II. Via his father, Sorel was the nephew of François de Menthon.

Initially planning to be a diplomat, Sorel studied international relations at the École normale supérieure, and worked as an embassy clerk in French Algeria from 1956 to 1957.

=== Acting career ===
Sorel made his debut in I Spit on Your Graves (1957), an adaptation of the notorious Boris Vian novel of the same name. After several film appearances in his native country, Sorel made his breakthrough in Italian cinema in 1960, starring in Alberto Lattuada's Sweet Deceptions and Mauro Bolognini's From a Roman Balcony. During the following two decades, Sorel starred in films like A View from the Bridge, The Four Days of Naples (both 1962), Highway Pickup (1963), Sandra (1965),The Man Who Laughs (1966), Belle de jour (1967), and Model Shop (1969). He worked with such notable directors as Luis Buñuel, Luchino Visconti, Roger Vadim, Jacques Demy, Dino Risi, Julien Duvivier, and Sidney Lumet. Early on, Sorel drew comparisons to Alain Delon in his appearance and screen persona, often playing romantic leads.

Beginning in the late 1960's, Sorel appeared in several giallo films, which brought him into recognition with international horror film fans. He starred in Lucio Fulci's first two gialli One on Top of the Other and A Lizard in a Woman's Skin, The Sweet Body of Deborah and A Quiet Place to Kill with Carroll Baker, and Aldo Lado's Short Night of Glass Dolls.

In 1973, Sorel played OAS leader Jean Bastien-Thiry in the thriller film The Day of the Jackal.

Since 1980, he has worked mostly in television. In 1984, he starred in the play Alice par des chemins obscurs, directed by Roger Planchon at the Théâtre National Populaire.

In 2016, he starred in the Élie Chouraqui film The Origin of Violence (2016).

== Honours ==
In 2011, Sorel was ascended a Commander of the Order of Arts and Letters.

== Personal life ==
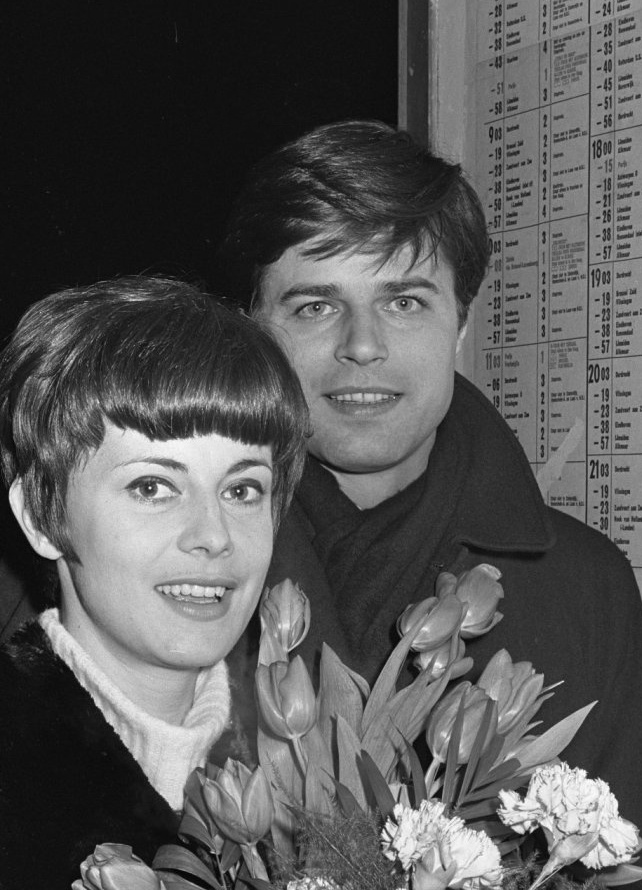
Jean Sorel with Anna Maria Ferrero in 1966

Sorel was married to Italian actress Anna Maria Ferrero from 1962 until her death in 2018. In 2018, he married Patricia Balme.

== Filmography ==
- 1959: I Spit on Your Grave as Elmer
- 1960: Les Lionceaux as Patrice
- 1960: Sweet Deceptions as Renato
- 1960: From a Roman Balcony as David
- 1961: Long Live Henry IV... Long Live Love! as Prince de Condé
- 1961: Amelie or The Time to Love as Alain
- 1961: Gold of Rome as Massimo
- 1962: A View from the Bridge as Rodolpho
- 1962: Disorder as Andrea
- 1962: Adorable Julia as Tom Fennel
- 1962: The Four Days of Naples as Livornese (uncredited)
- 1962: Hypnosis as Erik Stein
- 1963: Germinal as Étienne Lantier
- 1963: Highway Pickup as Paul Genest
- 1963: Un marito in condominio as Renato Carcaterra
- 1964: Amori pericolosi as Il legionario (segment "La ronda")
- 1964: Circle of Love as Le comte
- 1964: All About Loving as Antoine
- 1965: The Dolls as Vincenzo (segment "Monsignor Cupido")
- 1965: Sandra as Gianni Wald-Luzzati
- 1965: Made in Italy as Orlando (segment 3 'La Donna', episode 3)
- 1965: Weekend, Italian Style as Sergio
- 1966: The Man Who Laughs as Angelo / Astorre Manfredi
- 1966: Sex Quartet as Luigi (segment "Fata Elena")
- 1967: Belle de jour as Pierre Serizy
- 1967: Kill Me Quick, I'm Cold as Franco
- 1968: The Sweet Body of Deborah as Marcel
- 1968: Adélaïde as Frédéric Cornault
- 1968: Love Problems as Giorgio
- 1968: The Protagonists as Roberto
- 1969: A Complicated Girl as Alberto
- 1969: One on Top of the Other as Dr. George Dumurrier
- 1969: L'amica as Franco Raimondi
- 1969: Model Shop as Secretary
- 1970: Kill the Fatted Calf and Roast It as Cesare Merlo
- 1970: A Quiet Place to Kill as Maurice Sauvage
- 1970: Thou Shalt Not Covet Thy Fifth Floor Neighbour as Pedro Andreu
- 1971: A Lizard in a Woman's Skin as Frank Hammond
- 1971: Short Night of Glass Dolls as Gregory Moore
- 1971: In the Eye of the Hurricane as Paul
- 1971: The Double as Giovanni
- 1972: One Billion for a Blonde as Lt. Barney Holmes
- 1973: The Day of the Jackal as Bastien-Thiry
- 1973: Trader Horn as Emil DuMond
- 1973: Murder in a Blue World as Dr. Victor Sender
- 1973: The Great Kidnapping as Aloisi
- 1974: La profanazione as Dr. Banti
- 1975: Une vieille maîtresse (TV) as Ryno de Marigny
- 1977: Death Haunts Monica as Federico
- 1977: Les Enfants du placard as Berlu
- 1978: L'Affaire Suisse as Paul Suter
- 1978: The Man in the Rushes as Robert
- 1979: The Bronte Sisters as Leyland
- 1980: La Naissance du jour (TV) as Vial
- 1981: Quatre femmes, quatre vies: La belle alliance (TV) as Michel
- 1981: The Wings of the Dove as Lukirsh
- 1981: Aimée as Pierre Ménard
- 1981: Une mère russe (TV) as Le fils de 20 à 55 ans
- 1982: Aspern as Jean Decaux
- 1982: Le Cercle fermé (TV) as Jérôme Baron / Fabien Moreau
- 1982: La Démobilisation générale (TV) as Serge Boncourt
- 1982: Bonnie and Clyde Italian Style as The Captain
- 1983: Par ordre du Roy (TV) as Le marquis de Ganges (segment "La marquise des Anges")
- 1985: L'Herbe rouge (TV) as Wolf
- 1986: Affari di famiglia (TV) as Enrico
- 1986: Rosa la rose, fille publique as Gilbert
- 1987: Il Burbero as Giulio Machiavelli
- 1988: Le Crépuscule des loups (TV) as Werner
- 1988: Le Clan (feuilleton TV) as Giorgio Stivale
- 1989: Casablanca Express as Major Valmore
- 1990: Speaking of the Devil as Holy father
- 1990: Come una mamma (TV)
- 1990: Prigioniera di una vendetta (TV series) as Marc (1990)
- 1991: Millions as Leo Ferretti
- 1992: Les Cœurs brûlés (TV series)
- 1993: La scalata (TV series) as Alain Morrà
- 1993: Una madre come te (TV)
- 1995: Butterfly (TV series)
- 1995: Il prezzo della vita (TV)
- 1995: Fils unique
- 1995: Laura (TV)
- 1997: Desert of Fire (TV miniseries) as Miller
- 1997: Mamma per caso (TV series) as Giorgio
- 1997: Dove comincia il sole (TV series) as Antonio Amati
- 1998: À nous deux la vie (TV) as David
- 2004: Tout va bien c'est Noël! (TV) as Maxime
- 2005: I Colori della vita (TV)
- 2008: L'ultimo Pulcinella
- 2014: A Good Season (TV miniseries)
- 2016: Zambezia as Georges
- 2016: The Origin of Violence as Charles Wagner (final film role)
