= The President (1961 film) =

- Directed by: Henri Verneuil
- Written by: Michel Audiard
- Produced by: Jacques Bar; Raymond Froment; Ernest Rupp
- Starring: Jean Gabin; Bernard Blier
- Cinematography: Louis Page
- Edited by: Jacques Desagneaux
- Music by: Maurice Jarre
- Distributed by: UFA-Comacico
- Release date: 1 March 1961
- Running time: 94 minutes
- Country: France
- Language: French

The President (French: Le Président) is a 1961 French political thriller film directed by Henri Verneuil and based on, though altering, the ending of, the novel of the same title by Georges Simenon. It tells the story of a French prime minister (Jean Gabin), a lifelong proponent of the national good, who is twice betrayed by an opportunistic younger politician (Bernard Blier) but in the end gets his revenge.

The film's title refers to the former French term for prime minister, which was président du conseil des ministres (chairman of the cabinet), but has since been replaced by the term premier ministre (prime minister).

== Plot ==
Aged 73 and in ill-health, a former prime minister of France, the widower Émile Beaufort, spends his days in his country house near Evreux dictating his memoirs to his secretary. He gets to the point, some twenty years earlier, when he had to devalue the currency. After secretly meeting the governor of the central bank and the minister of finance, he agreed to make the announcement one Monday. That morning, huge currency speculation broke out and Beaufort realised only one other person knew of the plan. This was Philippe Chalamont, the head of his private office, whose father-in-law was a banker. He made Chalamont write out and sign a confession, which he has kept ever since.

In his last term as prime minister, he was a passionate advocate of the European union, seeing it as a healing of the hatreds which had torn the continent apart. His most persuasive opponent turned out to be Chalamont, by then in Parliament, who argued it would be bad for French business. In disgust at this petty-minded and sectional approach, Beaufort resigned and gave up politics.

Chalamont has now been asked to form a government, and Beaufort summons him to Evreux that evening. Before his enemy turns up, he removes the confession from its hiding place, puts it in his pocket and dozes off in front of the fire. He wakes up to find his secretary searching the room and, confronted; she admits she was bribed to find the incriminating document. Beaufort burns it and waits. When shown in, Chalamont opens with a spiel about relying in his new post on the advice of Beaufort, whom he has always admired and trusted, and how he too now believes in European unity. Beaufort is not fooled, preferring France to have a new prime minister who is not a crook and a liar, so he threatens to divulge the currency incident to the media. Next morning, the news is that Chalamont has declined to form a new government.

== Difference from the book ==
As noted, the film changed the ending of the original Simenon book. Throughout the book the protagonist does contemplate what he actually does in the film, i.e. to use the evidence in his possession to derail Chalamont's plans - but eventually he relents. The book ends with The Premier adopting a detached, stoic attitude, withdrawing from any further involvement in politics and serenely preparing for his approaching death. He leaves his former protégé to form a cabinet in peace, and burns documents incriminating various other politicians which he had kept hidden for years. In the process, he discovers, without much surprise, that his staff had been spying on him for years and that his secretary had long since discovered all these incriminating documents and let an ambitious police inspector photocopy them. Musing that the inspector would likely use the papers to blackmail his way to a high position, the Premier takes also that revelation stoically and without malice.

== Cast ==
- Jean Gabin - Émile Beaufort
- Bernard Blier - Philippe Chalamont
- Renée Faure - Mademoiselle Milleran, Beaufort's secretary
- Alfred Adam - François, Beaufort's chauffeur
- Henri Crémieux - Antoine Monteil
- Louis Seigner - Henri Lauzet-Duchet
- Robert Vattier - Le docteur Fumet
- Françoise Deldick - Huguette
- Hélène Dieudonné - Gabrielle
- Pierre Larquey - Augustin
- Jacques Marin - Gaston
