= The Old Guard (1960 film) =

1960 French film by Gilles Grangier

- Directed by: Gilles Grangier
- Screenplay by: Michel Audiard
- Based on: The Old Guard by René Fallett
- Produced by: Jacques Bar
- Starring: Pierre Fresnay; Jean Gabin
- Cinematography: Louis Page
- Edited by: Paul Cayatte
- Music by: Paul Durand; Francis Lemarque
- Distributed by: Cinétel
- Release date: 26 August 1960
- Running time: 90 minutes
- Country: France
- Language: French

The Old Guard (French: Les vieux de la vieille) is a 1960 French comedy film directed by Gilles Grangier and starring Pierre Fresnay and Jean Gabin. It was adapted from a 1958 novel of the same name by René Fallet.

== Cast ==
- Pierre Fresnay - Baptiste Talon
- Jean Gabin - Jean-Marie Péjat
- Noël-Noël - Blaise Poulossière
- Bruno Balp - L'ouvrier de la salle communale
- Yane Barry - Mariette
- Paul Bisciglia - Jojo, le fiancé de Mariette
- Charles Bouillaud - Le fils Bleuzet
- Denise Carvenne - La touriste en voiture
- Pierre Collet - Le livreur de bières
- Robert Dalban - Jérome Ardouin, le fossoyeur
- André Dalibert - Anselme Poulossière
- Guy Decomble - Le chauffeur du car
- Hélène Dieudonné - La supérieure de 'Gouyette'
- Yvette Etiévant - Louise
