= Anatomy of a Marriage: My Days with Françoise =

1964 film

- Directed by: André Cayatte
- Written by: Maurice Aubergé (collaboration); André Cayatte (screenplay adaptation); Louis Sapin (adaptation dialogue)
- Produced by: Raymond Froment (producer)
- Starring: See below
- Cinematography: Roger Fellous
- Edited by: Paul Cayatte
- Music by: Louiguy
- Release date: 1964
- Running time: 112 minutes
- Countries: France; Italy; West Germany
- Language: French

Anatomy of a Marriage: My Days with Françoise (Jean-Marc ou La vie conjugale) is a 1964 French film directed by André Cayatte telling the story of a marriage break-up told from the man's point of view.

The film is also known as Anatomy of a Marriage: My Nights With Francoise.

The film's companion piece Anatomy of a Marriage: My Days with Jean-Marc tells the story from the woman's point of view.

== Cast ==
- Marie-José Nat as Françoise Dubreuil
- Jacques Charrier as Jean-Marc Dubreuil
- Michel Subor as Roger
- Macha Méril as Nicole
- Alfred Adam as Fernand Aubry
- Giani Esposito as Ettore
- Jacques Monod as Rouquier
- Yves Vincent as Granjouan
- Blanchette Brunoy as Suzanne Aubry
- Jacqueline Porel as Line
- Jean-Henri Chambois as The President
- Rosita Fernández as The Maid
- Anne Caprile as Mme Monier
- Yvan Chiffre as Christian
- Corinne Armand as Christine
- Albert Dinan
- Sybil Saulnier as Danièle
- Michèle Girardon as Patricia
- Georges Rivière as Philippe

== Reception ==
In a joint review of the two films, Bosley Crowther of The New York Times wrote that the two main actors "skillfully [portrayed] the characteristics of nobility and selflessness or pettiness and shame" but that "the two main characters in these films are distinctly commonplace people, inadequate to responsibility, immature and hardly worth the exceptional attention that is given to them".
