= Two Are Guilty =

- Directed by: André Cayatte
- Written by: André Cayatte; Henri Jeanson; Charles Spaak
- Produced by: Willy Pickardt; Robert Sussfeld
- Starring: Anthony Perkins; Jean-Claude Brialy; Renato Salvatori
- Cinematography: Roger Fellous
- Edited by: Paul Cayatte
- Music by: Louiguy
- Production companies: Trianon; Ultra Films
- Distributed by: Gaumont Distribution
- Release date: 1 February 1963 (France)
- Running time: 131 min
- Countries: Italy; France
- Language: French

Two Are Guilty (French: Le glaive et la balance, lit. 'The Sword and the Scale', Italian: Uno dei tre, lit. 'One of the three') is a 1963 French-Italian crime drama film directed by André Cayatte. It was written by Cayatte, Henri Jeanson and Charles Spaak and stars American actor Anthony Perkins as the protagonist.

== Plot ==
On the French Riviera, after the son of a wealthy local woman is kidnapped for ransom, the police begin an investigation. The kidnappers manage to escape the police, killing their victim in the process, but three men are eventually discovered by the police at a lighthouse.

== Cast ==
- Anthony Perkins as Johnny Parson
- Jean-Claude Brialy as Jean-Philippe Prévost
- Renato Salvatori as François Corbier
- Pascale Audret as Agnès
- Anne Tonietti as Christine Prévost
- Marie Déa as Mme Winter
