= Mort, où est ta victoire? =

- Directed by: Hervé Bromberger
- Written by: Daniel-Rops
- Produced by: Georges Casati
- Starring: Pascale Audret
- Cinematography: Pierre Petit
- Edited by: Pierre Gillette
- Music by: Maurice Jarre
- Distributed by: Gaumont Distribution
- Release date: 1964
- Running time: 165 minutes
- Country: France
- Language: French

Mort, où est ta victoire? is a 1964 French film, directed by Hervé Bromberger. It stars Pascale Audret and Gabriele Ferzetti.
