= André Cayatte =

French filmmaker, writer and lawyer

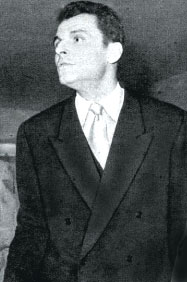
- Born: André Jean Cayatte; 3 February 1909; Carcassonne, Aude, Languedoc-Roussillon, France
- Died: 6 February 1989 (aged 80); Paris, France
- Awards: Golden Lion; 1950 Justice est faite 1960 Le Passage du Rhin

André Cayatte (French: [kajat]; 3 February 1909 – 6 February 1989) was a French filmmaker, writer and lawyer, who became known for his films centering on themes of crime, justice, and moral responsibility.

== Biography ==
Cayatte began his directoral career at the German-controlled Continental Films during the French occupation. Some of Cayatte's earlier films that addressed his characteristic themes include Justice est faite (Justice is Done; 1950), Nous sommes tous des assassins (We Are All Murderers; 1952), and Le passage du Rhin (Tomorrow Is My Turn; 1960).

In 1963, he undertook a bold experiment in film narrative with a set of two films: Jean-Marc ou La vie conjugale (Anatomy of a Marriage: My Days with Jean-Marc) and Françoise ou La vie conjugale (Anatomy of a Marriage: My Days with Françoise). These two films tell the same story from two different points of view. His 1973 film, There's No Smoke Without Fire, won the Silver Bear Special Jury Prize at the 23rd Berlin International Film Festival.

His younger brother was the film editor Paul Cayatte.

== Selected filmography ==
- Thunder Over Paris (1940)
- The Suitors Club (1941)
- La fausse maîtresse (1942)
- The White Truck (1943)
- Shop Girls of Paris (1943)
- Pierre and Jean (1943)
- Farandole (1945)
- Roger la Honte (1946)
- The Revenge of Roger (1946)
- The Ideal Couple (1946)
- Song of the Clouds (1946)
- The Last Penny (1946)
- The Unknown Singer (1947)
- Under the Cards (1948)
- The Lovers of Verona (1949)
- We Are All Murderers (1951)
- Before the Deluge (1954)
- Le Dossier noir (1955)
- An Eye for an Eye (1957)
- Two Are Guilty (1963)
- Anatomy of a Marriage: My Days with Françoise (1964)
- Anatomy of a Marriage: My Days with Jean-Marc (1964)
- Les risques du métier (1967)
- The Pleasure Pit (1969)
- To Die of Love (1971)
- There's No Smoke Without Fire (1973)
- Verdict (1974)
- State Reasons (1978)
- L'amour en question (1978)
