= Rue des prairies =

1959 film

- Directed by: Denys de La Patellière
- Written by: Michel Audiard
- Starring: Jean Gabin; Marie-José Nat
- Cinematography: Louis Page
- Edited by: Jacqueline Thiédot
- Music by: Georges Van Parys
- Distributed by: Cinédis
- Release date: 21 October 1959
- Running time: 87 minutes
- Country: France
- Language: French

Rue des prairies is a 1959 French drama film directed by Denys de La Patellière. It is an adaptation of a novel by René Lefèvre.

== Plot ==
Widower Henri Neveux (Jean Gabin) has difficult relationships with his children.

== Cast ==
- Jean Gabin - Henri Neveux
- Marie-José Nat - Odette Neveux
- Claude Brasseur - Louis, le fils d'Henri
- Roger Dumas - Fernand, l'enfant adopté
- Renée Faure - Me Surville
- Paul Frankeur - Ernest, l'ami d'Henri
- Roger Tréville - M. Jacques Pedrell, l'amant d'Odette
