= Michel Drach =

French director (1930–1990)

- Born: 18 October 1930; Paris, France
- Died: 14 February 1990 (aged 59); Paris, France
- Occupation: Film director
- Spouse: Marie-José Nat

Michel Drach (18 October 1930 in Paris – 14 February 1990 in Paris) was a French film director, writer, producer and actor.

== Life and career ==
Drach was born in Paris, France, the son of Yvonne (Vanderheym) and Maurice Drach. His family was Jewish. After studying painting at the Académie des Beaux-Arts, he became involved in cinema as an assistant to his cousin Jean-Pierre Melville.

He directed three short films under his production company Port Royal Films, including the Poor Man's Soliloquies (1951) and Auditorium (1957), then made his feature film debut with On n'enterre pas le dimanche (1959), a study on the existential solitude of a black person in Paris, which coincided with the French New Wave and earned him the Louis Delluc Prize.

He married Marie-José Nat who starred in his 1961 film Amelie or The Time to Love, a film which further displayed his humanism.

He returned to auteur cinema with Elise, or Real Life in 1970, which tells the story of a Frenchwoman, his wife Nat, in love with an Algerian at the time of the Algerian War. Violins at the Ball which evoked his Jewish childhood during the Occupation of France also starred his wife who received a Cannes Film Festival Award for Best Actress.

Le Pull-over Rouge (1979) was a chronicle of what he presents as a miscarriage of justice. Tell Me About Love (1975), Le Passé simple, and Guy de Maupassant (1982), confirmed his appeal for psychological intrigue. The latter was an expensive flop.

In 1986, with Sauve-toi, Lola, he tackled the theme of cancer, then the relationship between grandfather and grandson in Il est Génial Papy! (1987).

He had three children with Nat - David, Julien and Aurélien.

== Selected filmography ==
- No Burials on Sunday (1960)
- Amelie or The Time to Love (1961)
- fr:Les Compagnons de Jéhu (mini-série) (in French, after the eponymous novel by Alexandre Dumas) (1966)
- Elise, or Real Life (1970)
- Violins at the Ball (1974)
- Speak to Me of Love (1975)
- The Simple Past (1977)
