= Judith Magre =

French actress (born 1926)

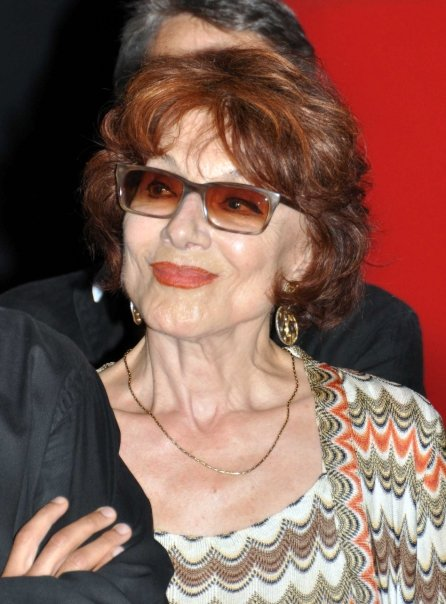
- Magre in 2009
- Born: 20 November 1926 (age 99); Montier-en-Der, Haute-Marne, France
- Years active: 1948–present
- Spouse: Claude Lanzmann (m. 1963; div. 1971)

Judith Magre (born 20 November 1926) is a French actress, born in Montier-en-Der, Haute-Marne.

== Filmography ==
Year	Title	Role	Director	Notes
1948	Clochemerle		Pierre Chenal	
1949	Maya		Raymond Bernard	
1951	Un grand patron		Yves Ciampi	
1952	Adorables créatures	Jenny	Christian-Jaque	
1952	My Husband Is Marvelous		André Hunebelle	
1953	The Long Teeth	Mr Commandeur's secretary	Daniel Gélin	
1953	Capitaine Pantoufle	Carmen's friend	Guy Lefranc	
1953	The Slave''	Claudie	Yves Ciampi (2)	
1954	Papa, maman, la bonne et moi	Germaine	Jean-Paul Le Chanois	
1955	Village magique		Jean-Paul Le Chanois (2)	
1955	Napoléon	A wonderful	Sacha Guitry	
1955	Tu ne m'échapperas jamais		Marcel Bluwal	TV movie
1955	The Grand Maneuver	Emilienne	René Clair	
1955	Le réveillon		Marcel Bluwal (2)	TV movie
1956	The Ambassador's Daughter	Minor Role	Norman Krasna	
1957	The Man in the Raincoat	Éva	Julien Duvivier	
1957	Procès de famille	Vanna	Marcel Cravenne	TV movie
1957	Comme un cheveu sur la soupe	A journalist	Maurice Régamey	
1957	Lovers of Paris	Rachel	Julien Duvivier (2)	
1957	La Parisienne	Irma	Michel Boisrond	
1958	White Cargo	Dora	Georges Lacombe	
1958	The Lovers of Montparnasse	The prostitute	Jacques Becker	
1958	La Joconde: Histoire d'une obsession		Henri Gruel	Short
1958	The Lovers	Maggy Thiebaut-Leroy	Louis Malle	
1958	Le Sicilien	Pete's wife	Pierre Chevalier	
1958	Les jeux dangereux	Éliane Fournier	Pierre Chenal (2)	
1958	Les Cinq Dernières Minutes	Corinne Lestelle	Claude Loursais	TV series (1 Episode : "Tableau de chasse")
1959	Signé: Arsène Lupin		Yves Robert	
1959	Le travail c'est la liberté	Yvonne	Louis Grospierre	
1959	Les Cinq Dernières Minutes	Marie-Laure Darsac	Claude Loursais (2)	TV series (1 Episode : "On a tué le mort")
1960	Bouche cousue	Barbara	Jean Boyer	
1960	Le dialogue des Carmélites	Rose Ducor	Raymond Léopold Bruckberger; Philippe Agostini	
1960	La caméra explore le temps	Charlotte de Sauves; The Marquise de Verneuil	Guy Lessertisseur; Stellio Lorenzi	TV series (2 episodes)
1963	Horace	Camille	Jean Kerchbron	TV movie
1964	Les fables de La Fontaine		Hervé Bromberger	TV series (1 Episode : "Le chat, la belette et le petit lapin")
1965	Huis clos	Inès	Michel Mitrani	TV movie
1966	Rouletabille	Callista	Robert Mazoyer	TV series (1 Episode : "Rouletabille chez les Bohémiens")
1966	La tour Eiffel qui tue	Hélène de Tigris	Jean-Roger Cadet; Michel de Ré	TV movie
1967	All Mad About Him	The medium	Norbert Carbonnaux	
1967	Woman Times Seven	Bitter Thirty	Vittorio De Sica	(1 Episode : "Amateur Night")
1967	Antoine et Cléopâtre	Cleopatra	Jean Prat	TV movie
1967	Bajazet	Roxane	Michel Mitrani (2)	TV movie
1968	La double inconstance	Flaminia	Marcel Bluwal (3)	TV movie
1969	La promesse	Éliane	Paul Feyder; Robert Freeman	
1970	Reportage sur un squelette ou Masques et bergamasques		Michel Mitrani (3)	TV movie
1970	Le Voyou	Mme Gallois	Claude Lelouch	
1971	La cavale	Gina	Michel Mitrani (4)	
1971	Un peu de soleil dans l'eau froide	Odile	Jacques Deray	
1973	Les Thibault	Anne de Battaincourt	André Michel; Alain Boudet	TV mini-series (4 episodes)
1973	Papa, les petits bateaux	Marylène	Nelly Kaplan	
1973	Petite flamme dans la tourmente	Tilia	Michel Wyn	TV movie
1974	And Now My Love	David's mother	Claude Lelouch (2)	
1974	Black Thursday	Mme Ash	Michel Mitrani (5)	
1974	Jeanne ou La révolte	Jeanne Harvilliers	Luc Godevais	TV movie
1975	Cat and Mouse	The lady with the dog	Claude Lelouch (3)	
1976	Mon coeur est rouge	Angry woman	Michèle Rosier	
1977	Genre masculin	Mme Jacquot	Jean Marboeuf	
1978	Allégra	Carmen Corail	Michel Wyn (2)	TV movie
1978	Les grandes conjurations: Le connétable de Bourbon	Louise de Savoie	Jean-Pierre Decourt	TV movie
1972–1979	Au théâtre ce soir	Several characters	Pierre Sabbagh; Georges Folgoas	TV series (5 episodes)
1979	La mouette	Arkadina	Jacques Duhen	TV movie
1979	The Associate	Mme. Brezol	René Gainville	
1979	Rien ne va plus	Béatrice	Jean-Michel Ribes	
1980	Je vais craquer!!!	Irina	François Leterrier	
1980	La sourde oreille	Antoinette	Michel Polac	TV movie
1981	À nous de jouer	Director of Programs	André Flédérick	TV movie
1981	Le beau monde	Anna	Michel Polac (2)	TV movie
1981	Adèle ou la marguerite	The Countess	Pierre Desfons	TV movie
1981	Oxalá	Françoise	António-Pedro Vasconcelos	
1982	Salut... j'arrive!	Mathilde	Gérard Poteau	
1983	Vive la sociale!	The mother	Gérard Mordillat	
1985	Les temps difficiles	Mélanie	Georges Folgoas (2)	TV movie
1986	Les étonnements d'un couple moderne	Solange Morane	Pierre Boutron	TV movie
1987	Spirale	Falconnetti	Christopher Frank	
1987	Les Cinq Dernières Minutes	Julia	Guy Jorré	TV series (1 Episode : "La peau du rôle")
1988	Un coeur de marbre	Mme Thérèse	Stéphane Kurc	TV movie
1988	M'as-tu-vu?	Salima		TV series (1 Episode : "La rencontre")
1988	L'enfance de l'art		Francis Girod	
1988	Paparoff	Antonia	Denys de La Patellière	TV series (1 Episode : "L'addition est pour moi: Paparoff est de retour")
1988	La belle Anglaise	Alice	Jacques Besnard	TV series (2 episodes)
1989	Les deux Fragonard	An anatomist	Philippe Le Guay	
1989	Jesus of Montreal	Dubbing actress	Denys Arcand	
1990	La campagne de Cicéron	Hermance	Jacques Davila	
1990	Feu sur le candidat	Huguette Cavaillon	Agnès Delarive	
1991	La milliardaire	Léon Raynaud	Jacques Ertaud	TV movie
1991	Le dernier lien	Camille	Joyce Buñuel	TV movie
1991	L'huissier	Mme Malicorne	Pierre Tchernia	TV movie
1992	Jour blanc	Eva Kalinska	Jacob Berger	TV movie
1992	Urgence d'aimer	Roselyne	Philippe Le Guay (2)	TV movie
1993	Rhésus Roméo	Roselyne	Philippe Le Guay (3)	TV movie
1994	Montparnasse-Pondichéry	Mme Chamot	Yves Robert (2)	
1994	Regards d'enfance	Colette	Jean-Paul Salomé	TV series (1 Episode : "La grande fille")
1995	L'enfant en héritage	Edith Schomberg	Josée Dayan	TV movie
1996	Berjac: Coup de théâtre	Edith	Jean-Michel Ribes (2)	TV movie
1996	Andrea	Renata	Sergi Casamitjana	
1996	Album de famille	Hélène	Shiri Tsur	Short
1998	Man Is a Woman	Simon's mother	Jean-Jacques Zilbermann	
2000	Le pique-nique de Lulu Kreutz	Olga Steg	Didier Martiny	
2000	Avocats & associés	Elodie Jacquin	Denis Amar	TV series (1 Episode : "Le bébé de la finale")
2003	Les parents terribles	Léo	Jean-Claude Brialy	TV movie
2003	Nathalie...	Catherine's mother	Anne Fontaine	
2004	Le menteur	Geneviève	Philippe de Broca	TV movie
2005	L'antidote	Mme Marty	Vincent De Brus	
2007	Trivial	Duchess	Sophie Marceau	
2007	Les interminables	Gaëlle	Thomas Pieds	TV movie
2007	Le réveillon des bonnes	Mme Despréaux	Michel Hassan	TV mini-series
2008	Ça se soigne?	Aline Bledish	Laurent Chouchan	
2008	John Adams	Madame Helvétius	Tom Hooper	TV mini-series (2 episodes)
2009	La folle histoire d'amour de Simon Eskenazy	Bella	Jean-Jacques Zilbermann (2)	
2009	Pour ma fille	Esther	Claire de la Rochefoucauld	TV movie
2010	What War May Bring	Esther	Claude Lelouch (4)	
2010	La maison des Rocheville	The house's voice	Jacques Otmezguine	TV mini-series (5 episodes)
2010	Quand l'amour s'emmêle	Jeanne	Claire de la Rochefoucauld (2)	TV movie
2011	Les Cybernautes rêvent-ils d'amours digitales?	Olga	Gilles Bindi	Short
2012	Aruna Villiers	TV series (1 Episode : "Mission à Pessac")		
2012	Granny's Funeral	Madame de Tandévou	Bruno Podalydès	
2012	Du vent dans mes mollets	The grandmother	Carine Tardieu	
2012	A l'abri de la tempête	Valentine	Camille Brottes	
2013	Clean	Granny	Benjamin Bouhana	Short
2013	La Minute Vieille			TV series (1 Episode : "Un spectateur hors du commun")
2014	Le règne de la beauté	Mathilde	Denys Arcand (2)	
2014	Ariane's Thread	The Turtle (voice)	Robert Guédiguian	
2016	Le sang de la vigne	Mme Newman		
2016	Elle	Irène Leblanc	Paul Verhoeven	
