= Black Dossier (film) =

1955 film

- Directed by: André Cayatte
- Written by: André Cayatte; Charles Spaak
- Produced by: Michel Safra; Angelo Rizzoli
- Starring: Jean-Marc Bory; Danièle Delorme; Lea Padovani
- Cinematography: Jean Bourgoin
- Edited by: Paul Cayatte
- Music by: Louiguy
- Production companies: Spéva Films; Rizzoli Film
- Distributed by: Cinédis
- Release date: 18 May 1955
- Running time: 115 minutes
- Countries: France; Italy
- Language: French

Black Dossier (French: Le Dossier noir, Italian: Fascicolo nero) is a 1955 French-Italian crime drama film directed by André Cayatte and starring Jean-Marc Bory, Danièle Delorme and Lea Padovani. It was shot at the Boulogne Studios in Paris. The film's sets were designed by the art director Jacques Colombier. It was entered into the 1955 Cannes Film Festival.

== Plot ==
Jacques Arnaud arrives in a small town somewhere in the province. Soon a citizen reports to him that strangers have broken into his house where they stole a mysterious "black dossier". This file had been given to him by a recently deceased citizen named Le Guen. The content of this file included information on the town's foremost businessman who behind his proper façade seems to be a ruthless fraudster. Arnaud has the corpse of Le Guen exhumed and proof is found that this man has died of poisoning.

== Cast ==
- Jean-Marc Bory as Judge Jacques Arnaud
- Danièle Delorme as Yvonne Dutoit
- Bernard Blier as Commissaire Noblet
- Lea Padovani as Françoise Le Guen
- Antoine Balpêtré as Dutoit
- Paul Frankeur as Charles Broussard
- Nelly Borgeaud as Danièle Limousin
- Noël Roquevert as Commissaire Franconi
- Daniel Cauchy as Jo
- Giani Esposito as Jean de Montesson
- Jacques Duby as Flavier
- Henri Crémieux as Le procureur Limousin
- Christian Fourcade as Alain Le Guen
- André Valmy as Inspecteur Carlier
- Gabrielle Fontan as Mme. Micoulin - la logeuse
- Nadine Basile as Suzanne Broussard
- Enrico Glori as Vaillant
- Gabriel Gobin as Le brigadier
- Charles Lemontier as Un journaliste
- Liliane Maigné as Florence
- Héléna Manson as Madame Limousin
- Madeleine Suffel as La voisine
- Monette Dinay as Thérèse
- Yvette Etiévant as Madame Piriou
- Guy Decomble as L'inspecteur Leroy
- Maria Zanoli as Marthe
- Lucien Nat as Docteur Dessouche
- Lucien Raimbourg as Titiche
- Sylvie as Madame Baju
- Edmond Ardisson as Le restaurateur
- Jean-Pierre Grenier as Gilbert Le Guen
- Madeleine Barbulée as Mademoiselle Limousin
