= Andrée Tainsy =

Belgian actress (1911–2004)

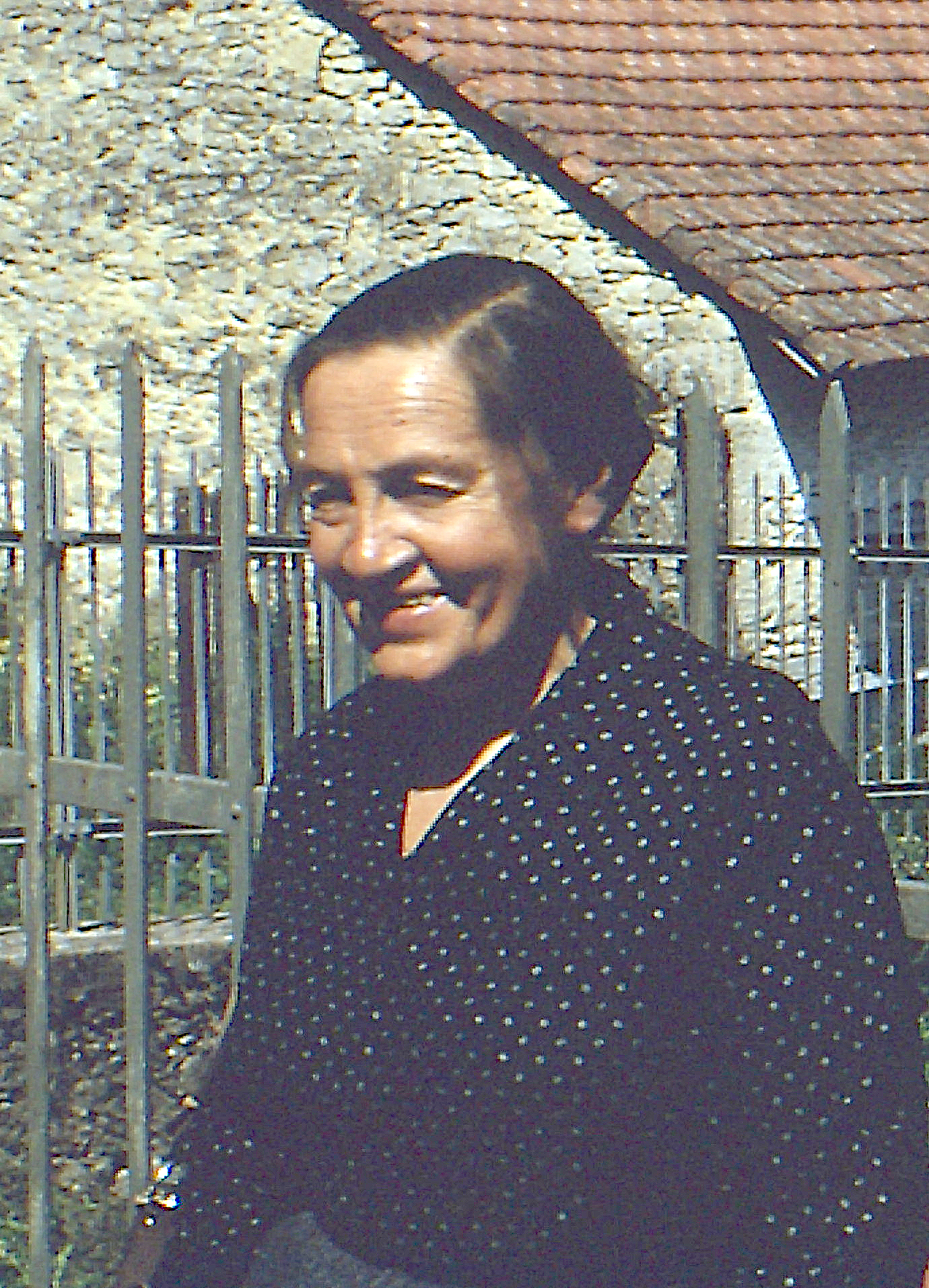
- Andrée Tainsy (Beau Masque,1972)
- Born: 26 April 1911; Etterbeek, Belgium
- Died: 19 December 2004 (aged 93); Paris, France
- Occupation: Actor

Andrée Micheline Ghislaine Tainsy (26 April 1911 – 19 December 2004) was a Belgian actress. She worked with several notable actors like Philippe Noiret, Jean Louis Trintignant, Charlotte Rampling and famous directors like Claude Chabrol, Costas Gavras and François Ozon. Tainsy began her career with theater plays and her first film debut was in 1945, followed by over 80 different cinema and TV works as co-star. She worked until the day of her death.

== Early life ==
She was born in Etterbeek, Belgium.

== Career ==
Andrée Tainsy attended Brussels' Conservatory, where she trained to become a theater performer in the early 1930s. She moved to Paris and made her debut with the Georges Pitoëff theatrical company in Les Voyageurs Sans Bagage (1937). Her film debut was ready in 1939 however, as World War II started, she fled to South America, where she reconnected with other artists who had also left. Her first experience in front of was in Chile a movie camera and in 1945 her movie career began starring in Jacques Remy's Le Moulin des Andes (Released in Chile as La Fruta Mordida).

Upon her return to France, after the end of the war, she resumed her theatrical activity with Les Amants de Noël and Joyeux Chagrins, both in 1948. Tainsy's career as an actress and comedian went on until the very end of her life. She worked until the day of her death. She appeared in a small role in Arnaud Desplechin's Rois et Reine on 22 December 2004, just three days after she died. Her cinema endeavors comprised works with several directors like Bertrand Tavernier, Woody Allen, Claude Chabrol, François Ozon and Arnaud Desplechin.

== Later life ==
On 19 December 2004, after attending a presentation of a play by Pierre Desproges, she suffered a heart attack at her Parisian apartment. She was buried at Père-Lachaise Cemetery in Paris.

== Selected filmography ==
- 1945: La fruta mordida
- 1949: Fantômas contre Fantômas - (uncredited)
- 1949: Mission in Tangier - La balayeuse du cabaret
- 1949: The Sinners - La fille de cuisine
- 1950: Botta e risposta
- 1950: Plus de vacances pour le Bon Dieu
- 1950: Julie de Carneilhan - Madame Sabrier
- 1951: Ma femme est formidable - La femme de chambre
- 1952: Agence matrimoniale - (uncredited)
- 1952: Holiday for Henrietta - (uncredited)
- 1953: Le chevalier de la nuit - L'habilleuse
- 1954: La neige était sale - (uncredited)
- 1956: Marie Antoinette Queen of France - Une émeutière (uncredited)
- 1956: Manequins de Paris
- 1956: Les Lumières du soir - Une demandeuse d'emploi
- 1957: The She-Wolves (1957) - La vendeuse de cartes de viste
- 1958: Seventh Heaven - Madame Helier (uncredited)
- 1958: One Life (Original title Une vie) - Ludivine - la servante
- 1958: Young Sinners - La réceptionniste (uncredited)
- 1959: Maigret et l'Affaire Saint-Fiacre - La patronne du Hula-Hoop (uncredited)
- 1960: Love and the Frenchwoman - (segment "Femme Seule, La") (uncredited)
- 1961: Bernadette of Lourdes
- 1962: Portrait-robot
- 1964: Diary of a Chambermaid - La paysanne
- 1964: Fantômas - L'habilleuse
- 1965: How to Keep the Red Lamp Burning - Germaine (segment "Bons vivants, Les") (uncredited)
- 1966: Les ruses du diable (Neuf portraits d'une jeune fille) - La mère de Ginette
- 1966: Le chien fou
- 1969: Z - La mère de Nick
- 1970: L'étrangleur - Mme Jeanne, la patronne du bar restaurant
- 1970: Trop petit mon ami - Mme Herbin
- 1970: Pele de Asno - La mère
- 1971: Man with the Transplanted Brain
- 1972: Faustine et le Bel Été - Grandmother
- 1972: Beau masque
- 1973: A Slightly Pregnant Man - Clarisse de Saint-Clair, une cliente du salon
- 1974: The Clockmaker of Saint Paul (Original title L'Horloger de Saint-Paul) - Madeleine Fourmet - qui a élevé Bernard
- 1975: That Most Important Thing: Love - La mère de Jacques (scenes deleted)
- 1975: Let Joy Reign Supreme - La religieuse
- 1975: Love and Death - (uncredited)
- 1977: Solemn Communion - Charlotte Fourcignie
- 1977: Spoiled Children - Madame Descombes
- 1977: Gloria - Estelle - la gouvernante
- 1977: A. Constant - Jeanne
- 1978: The Paradise of Riches (Original title Le Paradis des Riches) - Albertine
- 1978: Adieu voyages lents - La mère / Simone's Mother
- 1979: Twee vrouwen
- 1980: Ali in Wonderland
- 1981: Seuls - La tante
- 1981: Et pourtant elle tourne... - La grand-mère de Jeanne
- 1982: Boulevard des assassins - Mme Graveline
- 1985: Cop au Vin (Original title Poulet au Vinaigre) - Marthe
- 1993: Mensonge - Maria
- 1996: Le coeur fantôme - The old lady
- 1996: Love, etc. - Mireille
- 2000: Code Unknown - Mrs. Becker
- 2000: Under the Sand (Original title Sous le Sable* 1996 Love, etc - Suzanne
- 2003: Dans le rouge du couchant - Princesse Czerny
- 2003: Après vous... - Louis' Grandmother
- 2004: Kings and Queens (Original title Rois et Reine) - La grand-mère (final film role)
