= Michel Auclair =

French actor of Serbian descent

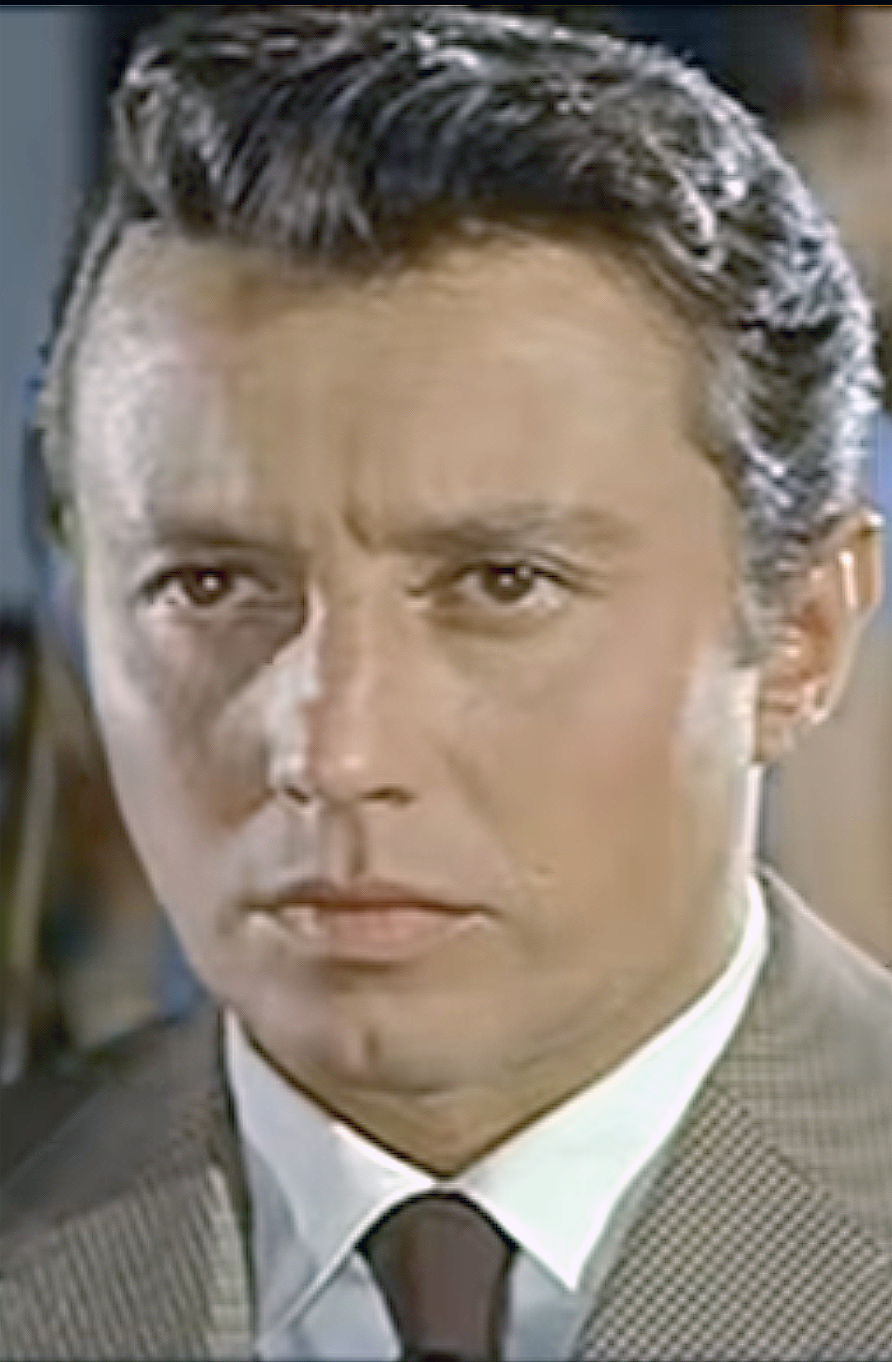
- Auclair in Rice Girl (1956)
- Born: Vladimir Vujović; 14 September 1922; Koblenz, Weimar Republic (now Germany)
- Died: 7 January 1988 (aged 65); Saint-Paul-en-Forêt, France
- Spouse: Frédérique Homo

Michel Auclair (born Vladimir Vujović, Serbian Cyrillic: Владимир Вујовић; 14 September 1922 – 7 January 1988) was an actor of Serbian and French ancestry, known best for his roles in French cinema.

Auclair was born to a Serbian father (born in Požarevac, Serbia) and a French mother in Koblenz. His father was Vojislav Vujović, prominent Yugoslav Communist and secretary of the Communist Youth International. Auclair moved to Paris when he was three years old. He entered medical school but then studied acting at the CNSAD in Paris.

While a major French star, he only had two English-language roles: as Professor Flostre in the 1957 musical Funny Face with Audrey Hepburn and Fred Astaire, and as a French police investigator in Day of the Jackal (1973) with Edward Fox.

== Filmography ==
=== Films ===
Year	Title	Director	Role	Notes
1946	The Misfortunes of Sophie	Jacqueline Audry	Paul d'Auber	
1946	La Belle et la Bête	Jean Cocteau	Ludovic	
1946	Ouvert pour cause d'inventaire	Alain Resnais		
1947	Les Maudits	René Clément	Willy Morus	
1948	Eternal Conflict	Georges Lampin	Mario	
1949	Manon	Henri-Georges Clouzot	Robert Dégrieux	
1949	The Hell of Lost Pilots	Georges Lampin	Léonard François	
1949	Singoalla	Christian-Jaque	Erland	
1950	Tuesday's Guest	Jacques Deval	Maurice Veneuse	
1950	No Pity for Women	Christian Stengel	Michel Dunan/Alain de Norbois	
1950	Justice est faite	André Cayatte	Serge Cremer	
1951	The Red Needle	Emil-Edwin Reinert	Florian Faber	
1952	Under the Thousand Lanterns	Erich Engel	Michel Dumas	
1952	Red Shirts (Camicie rosse)	Goffredo Alessandrini and Francesco Rosi	A volunteer	Uncredited
1952	The Temptress	Antonio Leonviola	Lut Loris	
1952	Holiday for Henrietta	Julien Duvivier	Maurice/Marcel	
1953	The Daughter of the Regiment	Géza von Bolváry	Leutnant Andreas	
1953	La figlia del reggimento	Géza von Bolváry and Tullio Covaz	Tenente Andrea	
1954	Zoé	Charles Brabant	Arthur Delay	
1954	Royal Affairs in Versailles (Si Versailles m'était conté)	Sacha Guitry	Jacques Damiens	
1954	Quay of Blondes	Paul Cadéac	Jacques Fenner	
1954	La Patrouille des sables	René Chanas	Pierre de Prémont	
1954	A Double Life	Victor Vicas	Jacques Frontenac	
1954	One Step to Eternity	Henri Decoin	François Roques (Larry)	
1954	Tres hombres van a morir	Feliciano Catalán	Pierre de Prémont	
1955	Andrea Chénier	Clemente Fracassi	Andrea Chénier	
1956	Rice Girl (La risaia)	Raffaello Matarazzo	Mario	
1957	The Schemer	Gilles Grangier	Jacques Lacroix	
1957	Funny Face	Stanley Donen	Prof. Emile Flostre	
1957	Irresistible Catherine	André Pergament	Georges Bartone	
1957	A Bomb for a Dictator	Alex Joffé	Franco Géron	
1957	The Fox of Paris	Paul May	André	
1959	The Lovers of Tomorrow	Marcel Blistène	Pierre Montfort	
1959	Maigret and the Saint-Fiacre Case	Jean Delannoy	Maurice de Saint-Fiacre	
1960	A Mistress for the Summer	Edouard Molinaro	Philippe	
1960	Murder at 45 R.P.M.	Étienne Périer	Jean Le Prat	
1962	L'Éducation sentimentale	Alexandre Astruc	Didier Arnoux	
1962	Le Rendez-vous de minuit	Roger Leenhardt	Jacques	
1963	Symphonie pour un massacre	Jacques Deray	Clavet	
1963	Portuguese Vacation	Pierre Kast	Michel	
1964	Mort, où est ta victoire?	Hervé Bromberger	Jean Paleyzieux	
1964	Trafics dans l'ombre	Antoine d'Ormesson	Philippe	
1964	La Chance et l'amour	Bertrand Tavernier	Alain Lorrière	(segment "Une chance explosive")
1966	Le Voyage du père	Denys de La Patellière	The friend of Marie-Louise	
1968	Sous le signe de Monte-Cristo	André Hunebelle	Villefort	
1968	Under the Sign of the Bull	Gilles Grangier	Magnin	
1970	The Mad Heart	Jean-Gabriel Albicocco	Serge Menessier	
1971	Les Mariés de l'an II	Jean-Paul Rappeneau	Prince	
1972	Paulina 1880	Jean-Louis Bertucelli	Narrator	
1973	Décembre	Mohammed Lakhdar-Hamina	Colonel de St-Méran	
1973	The Day of the Jackal	Fred Zinnemann	Col. Rolland	
1973	Impossible Object	John Frankenheimer	Georges	
1974	Les Guichets du Louvre	Michel Mitrani	M. Edmond	
1975	Souvenirs d'en France	André Téchiné	Hector	
1975	7 morts sur ordonnance	Jacques Rouffio	Dr. Mathy	
1977	Le Juge Fayard dit Le Shériff	Yves Boisset	Simon Pradal (the doctor)	
1978	L'Amour en question	André Cayatte	Philippe Dumais	
1979	Le Coup de Sirocco	Alexandre Arcady	Lucien Laurent Bonheur	
1979	Le Toubib	Pierre Granier-Deferre	Le patron	
1980	Three Men to Kill	Jacques Deray	Leprince	
1981	Pour la peau d'un flic	Alain Delon	Haymann	
1982	Mille milliards de dollars	Henri Verneuil	Michel Saint-Claude	
1982	Deux heures moins le quart avant Jésus-Christ	Jean Yanne	Le consul Demetrius	
1983	Enigma	Jeannot Szwarc		
1983	La Belle Captive	Alain Robbe-Grillet	Walter	Voice
1983	El señor presidente	Manuel Octavio Gómez	El Presidente	
1984	Rue barbare	Gilles Béhat	Georges Chetman (Chet's father)	
1984	Le Bon Plaisir	Francis Girod	Herbert	
1988	Preuve d'amour	Miguel Courtois	Charles Maurin	
1989	Torquemada	Stanislav Barabáš		(final film role)

=== Television shows and series ===
Year	Title	Episode	Role
1976	Bonjour Paris		M. Flinois
1976	Le train bleu s'arrête 13 fois	"Cannes : on ne gagne qu'une fois"	
1977	Commissaire Moulin	"Affectation speciale"	Commissaire Kirs
1978	Les Cinq Dernières Minutes	"Les Loges du crime"	Portal
1979	Histoires insolites	"Une dernière fois Catherine"	M Terrier
1979	Les Amours de la Belle Époque	"Crapotte"	Ruiné
1981	Les Héritiers	"Les Brus""	
1982	De bien étranges affaires	"Un homme ordinaire"	Le professeur Anderson
1983	Les Cinq Dernières Minutes	"La Chine à Paris"	Fondier

=== Television films ===
Year	Title	Director	Role
1962	Il est minuit docteur Schweitzer	Gilbert Pineau	Leblanc
1962	Le mal court	Alain Boudet	F
1964	La Chambre	Michel Mitrani	Pierre
1965	Huis clos	Michel Mitrani	Garcin
1973	Genitrix	Paul Paviot	Fernand
1973	Salomé	Pierre Koralnik	Hérode
1974	Faites entrer M. Ariman	Alain Dhenault	Luther Ariman
1975	Le Prix	René Lucot	Walter
1979	Madame Sourdis	Caroline Huppert	Rennequin
1980	Docteur Teyran	Jean Chapot	Axel Thor
1980	Lettres d'amour sur papier bleu	Edouard Logereau	Maurice
1981	Les Avocats du diable	André Cayatte	Orsini-Belcourt
1981	Martine Verdier	Bernard Toublanc-Michel	
1982	Les Invités	Roger Pigaut	Philippe Dubourg
1982	Lise et Laura	Henry Helman	Frédéric
1983	Bel ami	Pierre Cardinal	M. Walter
1985	Christopher Columbus	Alberto Lattuada	Luis De Santangel
1988	Les Rats de Montsouris	Maurice Frydland	Gaudebert

== Stage ==
Year	Title	Role
1977	The Lady from the Sea	
