= Paris in August =

1966 film

- Directed by: Pierre Granier-Deferre
- Written by: Rodolphe-Maurice Arlaud; Pierre Granier-Deferre; Henri Jeanson
- Based on: Paris in August by René Fallet
- Produced by: Louis-Emile Galey
- Starring: Charles Aznavour; Susan Hampshire; Michel de Ré
- Cinematography: Claude Renoir
- Edited by: Jean Ravel
- Music by: Georges Garvarentz
- Production companies: Compagnie Française de Distribution Cinématographique; Films Sirius
- Distributed by: Films Sirius
- Release date: 7 January 1966
- Running time: 94 minutes
- Country: France
- Language: French

Paris in August (French: Paris au mois d'août) is a 1966 French romantic comedy film directed by Pierre Granier-Deferre and starring Charles Aznavour, Susan Hampshire and Michel de Ré. It is an adaptation of the 1964 novel of the same title by René Fallet. The film marked the final appearance of the star Etchika Choureau, who retired from acting. It was shot at the Boulogne Studios in Paris and extensively on location around the city. The film's sets were designed by the art director Bernard Evein.

== Synopsis ==
While his wife is away on vacation during August, Parisian Henri Plantin a department store salesman encounters an English model who has arrived in Paris for a photoshoot.

== Cast ==
- Charles Aznavour as Henri Plantin
- Susan Hampshire as Patricia Seagrave
- Michel de Ré as Cogaille
- Daniel Ivernel as Civadusse
- Alan Scott as Peter
- Etchika Choureau as Simone Plantin
- Jacques Marin as Bouvreuil
- Héléna Manson as Mme Pampine, la concierge
- Dominique Davray as Model
- Christian Echelard as Le fils d'henri
- Léonce Corne as M. Poule
- Dominique Rozan as Le barman du bistrot
- Max Amyl as Le serveur de la brasserie Lipp
- Bernard Musson as Un client de la brasserie Lipp
- Jean Sylvère as Un client de la Samaritaine
- Dominique Zardi as Un intellectuel de la brasserie Lipp
- Henri Attal as Un collègue d'Henri
- Marcel Bernier as L'épicier

== Bibliography ==
- Goble, Alan. The Complete Index to Literary Sources in Film. Walter de Gruyter, 1999.
- Rège, Philippe. Encyclopedia of French Film Directors, Volume 1. Scarecrow Press, 2009.
- Vidal, Marion & Champion, Isabelle. Histoire des plus célèbres chansons du cinéma Solar, 1990.
