= Philippe Brizard =

French film, stage and television actor

- Brizard in Les loulous, 1977
- Born: Philippe Jean Marie Robert Brizard; 28 August 1933; Dieppe, France
- Died: 20 February 2021 (aged 87); Paris, France
- Occupations: Film, stage and television actor

Philippe Jean Marie Robert Brizard (28 August 1933 – 20 February 2021) was a French film, stage and television actor.

== Life and career ==
Brizard was born in Dieppe. He began his stage career in 1961, playing a priest in the stage play Dommage qu'elle est une putain. He then began his screen career in 1963, appearing in the film Les vierges. In 1964, he appeared in the film Les Gros Bras.

Later in his career, from 1992 to 1994, Brizard starred as Emile in the TF1 television series Le Miel et les Abeilles. He guest-starred in numerous television programs including Les Faucheurs de marguerites, Merci Bernard, V comme vengeance, Merci Sylvestre, L'Aéropostale, courrier du ciel, Petit déjeuner compris, Les Compagnons de Baal, Médecins de nuit and Hôtel de police. He also appeared in numerous films such as Le Diable dans la boîte, Incorrigible, Un aller simple, The Savage State, Tête à claques, The Infernal Trio, Les Surdoués de la première compagnie, La Soupe aux choux, French Connection II, L'école est finie, The Woman Cop, Jupiter's Thigh, Le Débutant and Le Bon Plaisir.

Brizard retired from acting in 2008, last appearing in the France 3 television series Famille d'accueil.

== Death ==
Brizard died in Paris on 20 February 2021, at the age of 87.
