= Paris, Palace Hotel =

1956 film

- Directed by: Henri Verneuil
- Written by: Charles Spaak; Henri Verneuil
- Produced by: Henri Baum; Angelo Rizzoli; Michel Safra
- Starring: Charles Boyer; Françoise Arnoul; Tilda Thamar
- Cinematography: Philippe Agostini
- Edited by: Louisette Hautecoeur
- Music by: Paul Durand
- Production companies: Rizzoli Film; Spéva Films
- Distributed by: Cinédis
- Release date: 19 October 1956
- Running time: 100 minutes
- Countries: France; Italy
- Language: French

Paris, Palace Hotel is a 1956 French-Italian romantic comedy film directed by Henri Verneuil and starring Charles Boyer, Françoise Arnoul and Tilda Thamar. It was shot in Eastmancolor at the Boulogne Studios in Paris. The film's sets were designed by the art director Jean d'Eaubonne.

== Synopsis ==
A manicurist working at a luxurious hotel in Paris and a young garage mechanic there to pick up a customer's luxury car, both pretend to be wealthy residents to impress each other with the friendly assistance Henri Delormel, one of the real guests at the hotel.

== Cast ==
- Charles Boyer as Henri Delormel
- Françoise Arnoul as Françoise Noblet
- Roberto Risso as Gérard Necker dit Brugnon
- Tilda Thamar as Madeleine Delormel
- Georges Chamarat as Alexandre - le coiffeur
- Louis Seigner as Marcel Brugnon
- Simone Bach as Barbara (brunette in red dress)
- Darry Cowl as Jules Hoyoyo
- Jacques Jouanneau as lackey at the entrance
- Jean Clarieux as surprise New Year's Eve manager
- Robert Dalban as New Year's Eve organizer
- Max Elloy as maître d'hôtel
- René Génin as Father Christmas
- Gabriel Gobin as brigadier
- Jacques Hilling as cook
- Georges Lannes as Monsieur Desmoulins, a client
- Jacques Marin as provider of flowers to the Palace
- Raoul Marco as butt pincher
- Jean Ozenne as Albert, daytime receptionist at the Palace
- Robert Pizani as Georges - maître d'hôtel at the Palace
- Albert Rémy as police station snorer
- Julien Carette as Bébert
- Michèle Philippe as Barbara
- Raymond Bussières as Soupape, the mechanic
- Gina Manès as L'Alouette, ragpicker
- Andréa Parisy as a manicurist
- Robert Seller as night receptionist at the Palace
- Don Ziegler as a foreign client

== Bibliography ==
- Parish, James Robert. Film Actors Guide: Western Europe. Scarecrow Press, 1977.
