= Seventh Heaven (1958 film) =

1958 film directed by Raymond Bernard

- Italian DVD cover
- Directed by: Raymond Bernard
- Written by: Jean Bernard-Luc; Raymond Bernard
- Based on: Seventh Heaven by André Lang
- Produced by: Henry Deutschmeister
- Starring: Danielle Darrieux; Noël-Noël; Paul Meurisse; Alberto Sordi
- Cinematography: Robert Lefebvre
- Edited by: Charlotte Guilbert
- Music by: Marcel Stern; Jean Wiener
- Production companies: Jolly Film; Titanus; Franco-London Films; Films Vesta
- Distributed by: Gaumont Distribution; Titanus
- Release date: 5 March 1958
- Running time: 107 minutes
- Countries: France; Italy
- Language: French

Seventh Heaven (French: Le Septième Ciel, Italian: La vedova electrica) is a 1958 French-Italian comedy film directed by Raymond Bernard and starring Danielle Darrieux, Noël-Noël and Paul Meurisse and Alberto Sordi. It was shot at the Boulogne Studios in Paris and on location around the city. The film's sets were designed by the art director Maurice Colasson.

== Cast ==
- Danielle Darrieux as Brigitte de Lédouville
- Noël-Noël as Guillaume Lestrange
- Paul Meurisse as Manuel Villa
- Alberto Sordi as Xavier Laurentis
- Gérard Oury as Maurice Portal
- Harry-Max as Le maire à Cannes
- Andrée Tainsy as Madame Helier
- Henri Virlojeux as Le garçon de café
- André Wasley as Un monsieur à l'inauguration
- Jacques Seiler as Le curé
- André Philip as Le maire
- Louisette Rousseau as La générale à l'inauguration
- Jean Degrave as Un joueur
- Pierre Brice as Un joueur
- Germaine Delbat as Mlle Lindex
- Bernard Musson as Le réceptionniste
- Alain Nobis as L'architecte de la piscine
- Albert Médina as Le commissaire

== Bibliography ==
- Burch, Noël & Sellier, Geneviève. The Battle of the Sexes in French Cinema, 1930–1956. Duke University Press, 2013.
- Gili, Jean A. & Tassone, Aldo. Parigi-Roma: 50 anni di coproduzioni italo-francesi (1945-1995). Editrice Il castoro, 1995.
- Rège, Philippe. Encyclopedia of French Film Directors, Volume 1. Scarecrow Press, 2009.
