= Solange Fasquelle =

French writer

- Born: 14 July 1933; Paris, France
- Died: 15 August 2016 (aged 83); Paris, France
- Occupation: Writer
- Years active: 1959－2016
- Spouse: Jean-Claude Fasquelle
- Children: 1
- Parent(s): Edmée Frish de Fels; Jean de La Rochefoucauld
- Awards: Cazes Prize(1961); Le Congrès d'Aix; Deux-Magots Prize(1967); L'Air de Venise

Solange Fasquelle (14 July 1933 – 15 August 2016) was a French writer. She is the author of more than 20 novels.

== Life ==
Solange Fasquelle was born in Paris, the daughter of Jean François Marie of La Rochefoucauld (1887–1970), Duke of La Rochefoucauld, and Edmée Frish of Fels (maiden; 1896–1991), Duchess.

== Works ==
Fasquelle's first novel, Malconduit (Paris: Éditions Julliard, in French), was published in 1959. She later won the Cazes Prize in 1961 for her 1960 novel, Le congrès d'Aix (Paris: Éditions Julliard, in French), translated to English by Nigel Ryan, Congress at Aix (London: Hamish Hamilton) – relating to the European Public Works Congress ("congrès européen des Travaux publics") held in Aix-en-Provence at the beginning of summer – and, in 1967, won the Deux-Magots Prize for her 1966 novel, L'Air de Venise [The Air of Venice] (Paris: Éditions Grasset).

Her lauded novels include Les Amants de Kalyros (1971) and Les falaises d'Ischia [The Cliffs of Ischia] (Paris: Éditions Albin Michel; 1977). Her 1972 book Le trio infernal [The Infernal Trio] (Paris: Presses de la Cité) was made into a film by Francis Girod, starring Michel Piccoli and Romy Schneider. Mère [Mother] (Paris: Éditions Grasset), her last novel, was published in 2003.

She was elected a member of the Femina Prize jury in 1992, following the steps of her mother, who had died the previous year. She remained on the jury until her death.

She had been the wife of Jean-Claude Fasquelle, chairman of the French publishing house Grasset from 1981 to 2000. Their daughter Ariane Fasquelle (née Ariane Marie Edmée Cyprien Fasquelle; 1955–2016) – also a publisher working as head of foreign acquisitions for Grasset – died April 19, 2016, before her mother.

== Bibliography ==
=== References ===
- "La maison Grasset" [The Grasset Publishing House] (in French). Éditions Grasset. Archived from the original on July 29, 2014 – via Wayback Machine.
- Le Monde (29 February 1992). "Deux nouveaux membres au jury du prix Femina" [Two New Members of the Jury of the Femina Prize] (in French).
- Le Monde (15 August 2016). "Mort de la romancière Solange Fasquelle. Prix des Deux Magots 1967 pour « L'Air de Venise » et membre du jury du prix Femina, elle s'est éteinte, le 15 août, à 83 ans" [Death of novelist Solange Fasquelle. Winner of the 1967 Prix des Deux Magots for L'Air de Venise and member of the Femina Prize jury, she died on August 15 at the Age of 83] (in French).
- M., Lauren (August 16, 2016). "Mort de Solange Fasquelle et Françoise Mallet-Joris : la littérature féministe en deuil" [Death of Solange Fasquelle and Françoise Mallet-Joris: Feminist Literature in Mourning]. Cosmopolitan StarAgora (in French). Archived from the original on July 5, 2017 – via Wayback Machine.
- Payot, Marianne [at Wikidata] (15 August 2016). "La femme de lettres Solange Fasquelle est morte". "Exclusif. La romancière Solange Fasquelle, membre du jury du prix Femina, est décédée à l'âge de 83 ans ce lundi des suites d'une longue maladie" [Woman of Letters Solange Fasquelle Has Died". "Exclusive. Novelist Solange Fasquelle, Member of the Jury of the Prix Femina, Died at the Age of 83 This Monday Following a Long Illness]. L'Express (in French).
- Paulet, Alicia; Agence France-Presse (16 August 2016). "Mort de Solange Fasquelle, romancière et femme de lettres". "Disparition – Prix des Deux-Magots en 1967 pour son livre L'Air de Venise, la fille de la duchesse Edmée de La Rochefoucauld est décédée lundi 15 août à Paris, victime d'une longue maladie, à l'âge de 83 ans" [Death of Solange Fasquelle, Novelist and Woman of Letters". "Death – Winner of the Prix des Deux-Magots in 1967 for her book The Air of Venice, the daughter of the Duchess Edmée de La Rochefoucauld died on Monday August 15 in Paris, the victim of a long illness, at the age of 83]. Le Figaro (in French).
