= The Road to Shame =

1959 film

- Directed by: Édouard Molinaro
- Written by: Gilles Morris-Dumoulin; Albert Simonin
- Based on: Des femmes disparaissent by Gilles Morris-Dumoulin
- Produced by: Lucien Masson; Georges Roitfeld
- Starring: Robert Hossein; Magali Noël; Estella Blain; Philippe Clay
- Cinematography: Robert Juillard
- Edited by: Laurence Méry-Clark
- Music by: Art Blakey
- Color process: Black and white
- Production companies: La Société des Films Sirius; Les Productions Jacques Roitfeld
- Distributed by: Compagnie Française de Distribution Cinématographique
- Release date: 1 May 1959
- Running time: 88 minutes
- Country: France
- Language: French

The Road to Shame or Women Disappear (French: Des femmes disparaissent) is a 1959 French crime thriller film directed by Édouard Molinaro and starring Robert Hossein, Magali Noël, Estella Blain and Philippe Clay. It was shot at the Boulogne Studios in Paris and on location in Marseille. The film's sets were designed by the art director Georges Lévy. It is noted for the jazz soundtrack by Art Blakey.

== Plot ==
A man tracks his girlfriend after she is taken to the headquarters of the white slave trade.

== Cast ==
- Robert Hossein as Pierre Rossi
- Magali Noël as Coraline Merlin
- Estella Blain as Béatrice
- Philippe Clay as Tom
- Jane Marken as Mme. Cassini
- Robert Lombard as Merlin
- François Darbon as Camille
- Pierre Collet as Nasol
- Jean Juillard as Pasquier
- William Sabatier as Carel
- Yvon Sarray as Delacour
- Olivier Mathot as Lambert
- Jean Degrave as Félicien
- Alain Nobis as Le commissaire de police
- Anita Treyens as Brigitte
- Monique Vita as Nina
- Claudie Laurence as Jacqueline
- Dominique Boschero as Thérèse
- Liliane Dreyfus as Madeleine (as Liliane David)
- Jacques Dacqmine as Victor Quaglio

== Bibliography ==
- Bessy, Maurice & Chirat, Raymond. Histoire du cinéma français: 1956-1960. Pygmalion, 1986.
- Rège, Philippe. Encyclopedia of French Film Directors, Volume 1. Scarecrow Press, 2009.
