= Georges-Alexandre Sarret =

French criminal

Georges-Alexandre Sarret (born Giorgio Sarrejani; 23 September 1878 – 10 April 1934) was a French criminal who was the last person to be executed in Aix-en-Provence. He was guillotined for double murder in a notorious case that involved his dissolving the bodies of his victims in sulphuric acid. Sarret's crimes reportedly inspired British serial killer John George Haigh, known as the Acid Bath Murderer.

== Biography ==
Sarret was born in Trieste, then part of the Austro-Hungarian Empire, of Greek descent, and emigrated to France in his youth. He studied medicine, chemistry and law at the University of Marseille. He became a lawyer and then a swindler, beginning a life insurance scam, in which two of his lovers, German sisters Catherine and Philomène Schmidt, married unhealthy men. The scheme involved another accomplice, Louis Chambon-Duverger, who would go for a medical examination while posing as one of the unhealthy husbands in order to be approved for life insurance. The husband's death would then be hastened via poison or some other measure, and the life insurance shared among the conspirators. Sarret and the sisters lived together in the suburbs of Aix-en-Provence at a villa they dubbed L'Hermitage.

However, at some point Sarret decided that Chambon-Duverger had become too greedy. On 10 August 1925, Sarret shot Chambon-Duverger and Chambon-Duverger's mistress, Noémie Ballandraux. Sarret and the Schmidt sisters then disposed of the bodies by putting them in a bathtub with sulphuric acid. This crime went undetected for six years until Catherine Schmidt was arrested for another life insurance scheme, in which she faked her own death by obtaining the body of a woman her own age and general description who had died of tuberculosis. Catherine moved to Nice to hide out, but while there, she fell in love with a man whom she followed to Marseille, very close to Aix-en-Provence, where she was recognized. During police interrogation, she confessed to her crimes as well as to what Sarret had done.

Sarret successfully delayed trial for two years, but was found guilty in October 1933 and sentenced to death. He was guillotined a few months later by Anatole Deibler. The Schmidt sisters each received 10 years in prison.

== In popular culture ==
The Sarret case was told by Solange Fasquelle in the book Le Trio infernal (The Infernal Trio), which was adapted to film in 1974 under the same title by Francis Girod, starring Michel Piccoli as Sarret, Romy Schneider as Philomène Schmidt and Mascha Gonska as Catherine Schmidt.
