= A Bomb for a Dictator =

1957 film

- Directed by: Alex Joffé
- Written by: Alex Joffé; Jean Le Vitte
- Produced by: Pierre Lévy-Corti
- Starring: Pierre Fresnay; Michel Auclair; Tilda Thamar
- Cinematography: Léonce-Henri Burel
- Edited by: Raymond Lamy
- Music by: Paul Misraki
- Production companies: Cinégraph; Coopérative Générale du Cinéma; Films Régent
- Distributed by: Pathé Consortium Cinéma
- Release date: 8 November 1957
- Running time: 90 minutes
- Country: France
- Language: French

A Bomb for a Dictator or The Fanatics (French: Les fanatiques) is a 1957 French thriller film directed by Alex Joffé and starring Pierre Fresnay, Michel Auclair and Tilda Thamar. It was shot at the Boulogne Studios in Paris and on location at Nice Airport. The film's sets were designed by the art director Jacques Paris.

== Synopsis ==
While a tyrannical South American dictator is visiting Europe a group of revolutionaries plan to assassinate his private plane. However, when it turns out he has changed his plans and will be flying back on a commercial flight they have to do decide whether to carry on with their plans even though it will lead to the deaths of the other passengers, or let him return to seek revenge on the plotters.

== Cast ==
- Pierre Fresnay as Luis Vargas
- Michel Auclair as Franco Géron
- Françoise Fabian as Mme. Lambert
- Grégoire Aslan as Général Ribera
- Tilda Thamar as Juana Ribera
- Betty Schneider as Lili
- Pascal Alexandre as François
- José Lewgoy as Ramirez
- Pierre Tabard as Savelli
- René Hell as Coti
- Gregori Chmara as the inquisitive passenger

== Bibliography ==
- Dalle Vacche, Angela . André Bazin's Film Theory: Art, Science, Religion. Oxford University Press, 2020.
- Katz, Ephraim. The Film Encyclopedia. Crowell, 1979.
- Oscherwitz, Dayna & Higgins, MaryEllen. The A to Z of French Cinema. Scarecrow Press, 2009.
