= Black Sun (1966 film) =

1966 film

- Directed by: Denys de La Patellière
- Written by: Denys de La Patellière; Pascal Jardin
- Produced by: Raymond Danon; Maurice Jacquin
- Starring: Michèle Mercier; Daniel Gélin; Valentina Cortese
- Cinematography: Armand Thirard
- Edited by: Jacqueline Thiédot
- Music by: Georges Garvarentz
- Production company: Les Films Copernic
- Distributed by: Comacico
- Release date: 10 December 1966
- Running time: 90 minutes
- Countries: France; Italy
- Language: French

Black Sun (French: Soleil noir) is a 1966 French-Italian crime thriller film directed by Denys de La Patellière and starring Michèle Mercier, Daniel Gélin and Valentina Cortese. It was shot at the Boulogne Studios in Paris and on location near Ouargla in Algeria. The film's sets were designed by the art director Léon Barsacq.

== Synopsis ==
The heiress Christine Rodier travels to a North Africa to find her long-lost brother Guy, who has been living in the Sahara Desert. Wanted for his collaboration with the Germans during the Second World War, he is living amongst former Nazis and other unsavoury types in a remote location.

== Cast ==
- Michèle Mercier as Christine Rodier
- Daniel Gélin as Guy Rodier
- David O'Brien as Eliott
- Valentina Cortese as Maria
- Louis Seigner as Gaston Rodier
- Denis Savignat as Simon
- Denise Vernac as Elise Rodier
- Harry Riebauer as Herman
- Patrick Balkany as Patrick Rodier
- Maurice Garrel as Collabo
- Carlos da Silva as Franco
- Jean Topart as Bayard
- Michel de Ré as Ergy
- Jean Martinelli as Le curé
- Frank Villard as Le curé
- Jacques Monod as Gorel

== Bibliography ==
- Bessy, Maurice, Chirat, Raymond & Bernard, André. Histoire du cinéma français: encyclopédie des films 1966-1970. Pygmalion, 1986.
- Rège, Philippe. Encyclopedia of French Film Directors, Volume 1. Scarecrow Press, 2009.
