= Georges Lourau =

French film producer

- Born: 30 October 1898; Pau, Pyrénées-Atlantiques, France
- Died: 12 October 1974 (aged 75); Paris, France
- Occupation: Producer
- Years active: 1931–1968 (film)

Georges Lourau (1898–1974) was a French film producer active from the 1930s to the 1960s. During the 1930s he was the director of Tobis Filmsonor, the French subsidiary of Germany company Tobis Film based at Epinay Studios in Paris. In the postwar era he was associated with the distribution outfit Cinédis, producing four films directed by Henri-Georges Clouzot. He was also a president of Unifrance. He was a member of the jury at the 1937 Venice Film Festival and the 1967 Cannes Film Festival.

== Selected filmography ==
- Here's Berlin (1932)
- Final Accord (1938)
- Patrie (1946)
- Under the Sky of Paris (1951)
- Messalina (1951)
- Holiday for Henrietta (1952)
- Lucrèce Borgia (1953)
- The Wages of Fear (1953)
- Wild Fruit (1954)
- Madame du Barry (1954)
- Marianne of My Youth (1955)
- Madelon (1955)
- Les Diaboliques (1955)
- Women's Club (1956)
- Le secret de soeur Angèle (1956)
- Les Espions (1957)
- La Parisienne (1957)
- Maigret and the Saint-Fiacre Case (1959)
- A Mistress for the Summer (1960)
- All the Gold in the World (1961)
- The Nina B. Affair (1961)
- Mad Sea (1963)
- Shéhérazade (1963)
- Male Hunt (1964)
- Gibraltar (1964)
- The Night of the Generals (1967)
- Love in the Night (1968)

== Bibliography ==
- Lloyd, Christopher. Henri-Georges Clouzot: French Film Directors. Manchester University Press, 2007.
- Roust, Colin. Georges Auric: A Life in Music and Politics. Oxford University Press, 2020.
- Segrave, Kerry. Foreign Films in America: A History. McFarland, 2014.
