= Black Thursday (film) =

1974 film directed by Michel Mitrani

- Directed by: Michel Mitrani
- Written by: Michel Mitrani; Albert Cossery; Roger Boussinot
- Starring: Christian Rist
- Cinematography: Jean Tournier
- Edited by: Ziva Postec
- Music by: Mort Shuman
- Distributed by: Gaumont Distribution
- Release date: 28 August 1974
- Running time: 92 minutes
- Country: France
- Language: French

Black Thursday (French: Les Guichets du Louvre) is a French film from 1974 directed by Michel Mitrani. Based on a semi-autobiographical 1960 novel by Roger Bousinnot, the film portrays the Vel' d'Hiv Roundup in 1942, when French police arrested over 13,000 Jewish inhabitants of Paris and held them under inhumane conditions for deportation to Auschwitz, where virtually all were murdered. It was entered into the 24th Berlin International Film Festival.

== Plot ==
On 16 July 1942 in Paris, Paul, a young student on the Left Bank, hears that the French authorities are rounding up the Jewish inhabitants of the city for deportation. To make a gesture against the evil of the German occupation and the collaborationist French régime, he goes to a Jewish quarter on the Right Bank determined to save someone. French police are there in force, herding Jewish people out of apartments and hustling them into commandeered buses. They already have the names and addresses, and can easily recognise Jewish people by the compulsory yellow star sewn to their clothes.

Individuals Paul approaches either do not understand the danger they face or mistrust his intentions. One young woman he is talking to, Jeanne, is called urgently into a shop, where the shopkeeper says that her mother and sister have just been taken and cuts the yellow star off her jacket. She agrees to let Paul escort her to the apartment of relations. They however have been ordered to pack their bags and, when the police arrive to take them away, hide Paul and Jeanne.

This leaves Jeanne with nowhere to go, but she is wary of Paul and unsure that going to his room on the Left Bank is a solution. Getting out of the Jewish quarter is difficult in any case, as plainclothes police are checking the identity of everybody in the streets. More than once Paul averts police attention by getting into a clinch with Jeanne, who plays along half-heartedly. Ducking into a café used by prostitutes and their pimps, a plainclothes man gets interested in Jeanne. She is saved by a pimp, who fells the cop and wishes the pair well as they flee.

In the empty courtyard of the Louvre museum, Paul explains his motives to Jeanne and his hopes of a better life they could share. However, halfway across the bridge to the Left Bank, she decides she can go no further with him.

== Cast ==
- Christian Rist: Paul
- Christine Pascal: Jeanne
- Judith Magre: Mme Ash
- Henri Garcin: Ernst Jünger
- Michel Robin: the cousin
- Michel Auclair: M. Edmond
- Alice Sapritch: old woman
- Albert Michel: plumber
- Françoise Bertin: The dyer
- Fanny Robiane
