= Monsieur de Pourceaugnac (film) =

1985 film

- Directed by: Michel Mitrani
- Written by: Michel Mitrani; Molière
- Produced by: Roger Coggio
- Starring: Michel Galabru
- Cinematography: Claude Lecomte
- Edited by: Anick Baly
- Release date: 24 April 1985
- Running time: 91 minutes
- Country: France
- Language: French

Monsieur de Pourceaugnac is a 1985 French drama film directed by Michel Mitrani that is based on the 1669 play of the same name by Molière. It was screened in the Un Certain Regard section at the 1985 Cannes Film Festival.

== Cast ==
- Michel Galabru - Monsieur de Pourceaugnac
- Roger Coggio - Sbrigani
- Fanny Cottençon - Julie
- Jérôme Anger - Eraste
- Jean-Paul Roussillon - Oronte
- Rosy Varte - Nérine
- Anne-Marie Besse - Lucette
- Jean-Pierre Castaldi - The Swiss
- Michel Aumont - Le premier médecin
- Paul Le Person - Le second médecin
- Michel Mitrani - Louis XIV
- Jean-Louis Bindi - Un chanteur
- Étienne Lestringant - Un chanteur
- Paule Andrée Nirouet - Une chanteuse
- Jean-Paul Barbier - Un danseur

== Reception ==
The film was described as an "attempt not without elegance to adapt" Molière's play. Cinéma wrote that Mitrani had "used various techniques to solve the problem of adaptation, and his film [was] pleasantly striking in its modernism".
