= Under the Sky of Paris =

1951 film

- Directed by: Julien Duvivier
- Written by: Julien Duvivier; René Lefèvre
- Produced by: Arys Nissotti; Pierre O'Connell; José Bosch; Georges Lourau
- Starring: Brigitte Auber; Jean Brochard; René Blancard
- Cinematography: Nicolas Hayer
- Edited by: André Gaudier
- Music by: Jean Wiener
- Production company: Regina Films
- Distributed by: Filmsonor
- Release date: 28 March 1951
- Running time: 105 minutes
- Country: France
- Language: French

Under the Sky of Paris (French: Sous le ciel de Paris) is a 1951 French drama film directed by Julien Duvivier. It was shot at the Billancourt Studios in Paris and on location around the city. The film's sets were designed by the art director René Moulaert. The song of the same name, later recorded by Édith Piaf and others, was written for this film by Hubert Giraud (music) and Jean Dréjac (lyrics). In the film it was sung by Jean Bretonnière.

== Plot ==
Under the sky of Paris, during a day, we see large and small events that occur in the lives of several people whose fates will intertwine. A poor old lady, after searching in vain all day to feed her cats, receives an unexpected reward from a mother whose daughter she had found. A young girl, dreaming of love, refuses the advances of her childhood friend to be stabbed to death by a sadistic sculptor. The latter is shot by a policeman who accidentally injured a worker who was returning home after the successful conclusion of a strike. Rushed to hospital, the injured worker is saved through the first open-heart surgery performed by a young surgeon who has just failed his intern exam.

== Cast ==
- Brigitte Auber as Denise Lambert
- Jean Brochard as Jules Hermenault
- René Blancard as Le professeur Bertelin
- Paul Frankeur as Milou
- Raymond Hermantier as Mathias, l'artiste
- Daniel Ivernel as Georges Forestier
- Pierre Destailles as Michel
- Jacques Clancy as Armand Mestre
- Christiane Lénier as Marie-Thérèse
- Marie-France as La petite Colette Malingret
- Marcelle Praince as Madame Balthazar, la voyante
- Catherine Fonteney as La dame des invalides
- René Génin as Le cocher
- Georgette Anys as Madame Malingret
- Jane Morlet as La contrôleuse des vieillards
- Serge Nadaud as Le bijoutier
- Guy Favières as Le malade
- Georgius as Malingret
- Robert Favart as Maximilien
- André Valmy as Le docteur Lucien Evrard
- Maryse Paillet as Madame Milou
- Nicolas Vogel as Un gréviste
- Wanny as Mado, la prostituée
- Nadine Basile as La stoppeuse
- Colette Régis as L'infirmière-chef
- Louis Florencie as Le prêtre
- Rivers Cadet as Etienne Lambolle
- Henri Coutet as Le délégué syndical
- Michel Rob as Pirate, le jeune garçon
- Sylvie as Mademoiselle Perrier
