= Where the Truth Lies (1962 film) =

- American release poster
- Directed by: Henri Decoin
- Written by: Claude Accursi; Henri Decoin; Albert Husson; Pierre Boileau (novel); Thomas Narcejac (novel)
- Produced by: Irénée Leriche; Robert Sussfeld
- Starring: Juliette Gréco; Jean-Marc Bory; Liselotte Pulver
- Cinematography: Marcel Grignon
- Edited by: Robert Isnardon
- Music by: Pierre Henry
- Production companies: Marianne Productions; Gaumont
- Distributed by: Gaumont
- Release date: 14 March 1962
- Running time: 105 minutes
- Country: France
- Language: French

Where the Truth Lies (French: Maléfices) is a 1962 French horror thriller film directed by Henri Decoin and starring Juliette Gréco, Jean-Marc Bory and Liselotte Pulver.

== Cast ==
- Juliette Gréco as Myriam Heller
- Jean-Marc Bory as François Rauchelle
- Liselotte Pulver as Catherine Rauchelle
- Mathé Mansoura as Ronga
- Jacques Dacqmine as Vial
- Jeanne Pérez as Mother Capitaine
- Georges Chamarat as Malet
- Robert Dalban as Butcher
- Marcel Pérès as Chauvin

== Remake ==
The Boileau-Narcjeac novel was filmed again for television in 1990. It was directed by Carlo Rola and starred Pierre Malet, Iris Berben and Susanne Lothar.

== Bibliography ==
- Hans-Michael Bock and Tim Bergfelder. The Concise Cinegraph: An Encyclopedia of German Cinema. Berghahn Books.
