= Una prostituta al servizio del pubblico e in regola con le leggi dello stato =

- Italian theatrical release poster
- Directed by: Italo Zingarelli
- Written by: Barbara Alberti; Amedeo Pagani; Italo Zingarelli
- Starring: Giovanna Ralli; Giancarlo Giannini; Jean-Marc Bory
- Cinematography: Mario Montuori
- Release date: 1970
- Country: Italy
- Language: Italian

Una prostituta al servizio del pubblico e in regola con le leggi dello stato (literally "A prostitute serving the public and complying with the laws of the state", also known as Prostitution Italian Style) is a 1970 Italian drama film written and directed by Italo Zingarelli.

For her performance Giovanna Ralli won the Grolla d'oro for best actress.

== Cast ==
- Giovanna Ralli: Oslavia
- Giancarlo Giannini: Walter
- Jean-Marc Bory: François Coly
- Denise Bataille
- Paolo Bonacelli
- Roberto Chevalier
