= Barbara Alberti =

Italian writer, journalist and screenwriter

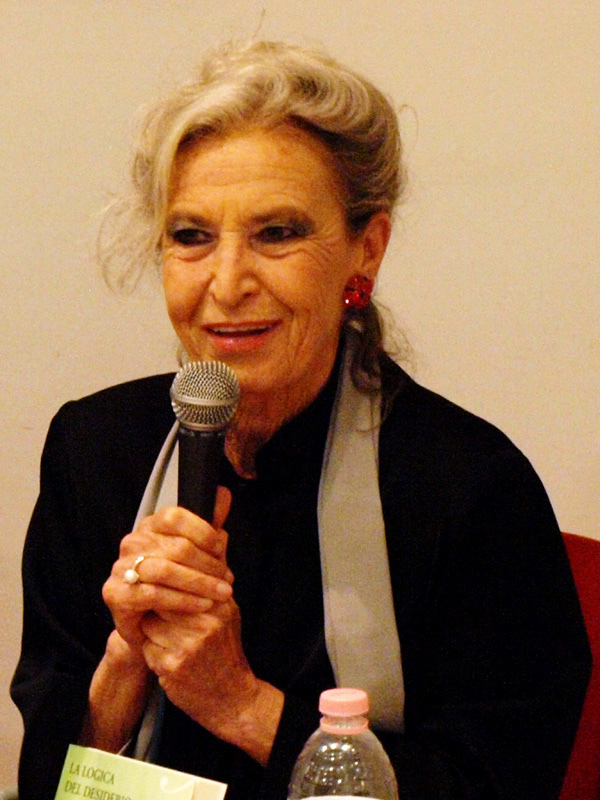
- Born: 11 April 1943 (age 83); Umbertide, Perugia, Umbria, Italy
- Occupations: Screenwriter; reporter; media personality; actress; author
- Website: www.barbaraalberti.it

Barbara Alberti (born 11 April 1943) is an Italian writer, reporter and media personality.

== Early life ==
Alberti was born in Umbertide and grew up in a poor family; she was given a Catholic education. When she was 15, her family moved to Rome. Alberti has said that, although she hated the city at first sight, she eventually warmed to it. She attended Rome University and took a degree in philosophy.

== Work ==
She aims to fight the traditional feminine image. Her works include the picaresque evil Memorie Malvagie (1976) to the meditative Vangelo secondo Maria (1979), a stronger work tinged with humor and provocation such as Il signore è servito (1983), Povera bambina (1988), Parliamo d'amore (1989), Delirio e Gianna Nannini from Siena, both from 1991, and Il promesso sposo (1994), a profile dedicated to the art critic Vittorio Sgarbi and presented in the guise of a "fake" autobiography.

A humorous production is La donna è un animale stravagante davvero: ottanta ritratti ingiusti e capricciosi (1998), in which Alberti imaginged Don Giovanni beside some female figures of her generation. Her protagonists take on the same challenge: to find the happiness. Creatures in revolt: injudicious old, children of hell, hell, saints. She has been passionate about the fantastic biographies of existing characters, living and dead.

In 2003, Alberti published Gelosa di Majakovsky, a biography of the poet (for which, in the same year, she was awarded the Alghero Woman Prize), and The Prince's Steering Wheel, in which she told the life of Antoine de Saint-Exupéry. In 2006 she authored a book of short stories about husbands returning home.

She is the author of many screenplays, including Anche gli angeli mangiano fagioli (1973), Il portiere di notte (1974) and Melissa P. (2005), as well as plays Ecce Homo.

Since 2009, she has written a weekly column, "La posta di Barbara Alberti" in Il Fatto Quotidiano.

Alberti worked as commentator/pundit on television talk shows, including Pomeriggio 5, Italia sul 2 and La guardiana del faro.

== Personal life ==
Alberti married producer and screenwriter Amedeo Pagani (three times). They have two children, Gloria Samuela (1966) and Malcom (1975). They first married in London to please her father, then in the Abbey of Casamari in Ciociaria to please Pagani's mother as she did not know about the London event, and for a third and last time "in the house of Ananias grandfather, my father's father, with lots of dancing on the threshing floor." Pagani left Alberti in the 1980s for Elisabetta Billi but returned to her fifteen years later because of the children. They never officially divorced and Alberti refers to him as "then-husband, now a dear relative". She does not believe in God, although she thinks there's a need of spirituality in the contemporary world.

== Literary works ==
- Riprendetevi la faccia, Mondadori (2010)
- Il ritorno dei mariti, Mondadori (2006)
- Il Principe Volante, Playground (2004)
- Gelosa di Majakovskij, Marsilio (1994)
- Il promesso sposo (a biography of Vittorio Sgarbi), Edoardo Sonzogno (1994)
- Vocabolario d'amore, Rizzoli (1994)
- La donna è un animale stravagante davvero, Frontiera Edizioni (1994)
- Gianna Nannini da Siena (a biography of Gianna Nannini), Mondadori (1991)
- Parliamo d'amore, Mondadori (1989)
- Dispetti divini, Marsilio (1989)
- Povera bambina, Mondadori (1987)
- Tahiti Bill, Mondadori (1985)
- Buonanotte Angelo, Mondadori (1985)
- Scometto di sì, Mondadori (1984)
- Fulmini, Spirali, (1984)
- Il signore è servito, Mondadori (1983)
- Sbrigati mama, Mondadori (1983)
- Donna di piacere, Mondadori (1980)
- Vangelo secondo Maria, Mondadori (1978)
- Delirio, Mondadori (1977)
- Memorie malvage, Marsilio (1976)

== Filmography ==
=== As screenwriter ===
Year	Title	Notes
1969	La stagione dei sensi	
1970	Una prostituta al servizio del pubblico e in regola con le leggi dello stato	
1970	So Long Gulliver	
1972	... All the Way, Boys!	
1972	The Master and Margaret	
1974	The Night Porter	
1975	Blonde in Black Leather	
1975	Colpita da improvviso benessere	
1976	Mimì Bluette... fiore del mio giardino	
1976	Lunatics and Lovers	
1977	Maladolescenza	
1977	Pensione paura	
1979	Ernesto	
1981	La disubbidienza	
1984	Una donna allo specchio	
1992	Angeli e Sud	
1997	Donna di piacere	
1998	Monella	
2005	Melissa P.	
2009	I Am Love	
2013	L'arbitro	
2014	Misunderstood	
2017	La guerra dei cafoni	
2018	The Man Who Bought the Moon	
2023	Vangelo secondo Maria	

=== Acting roles ===
Year	Title	Role(s)	Notes
2019	The Goddess of Fortune	Elena Muscarà	
2022	The Desired War	Violinist	Cameo appearance
2024	Fragili	Filippa	Miniseries
2026	Still Sexy	Herself	Cameo role

=== Television appearances ===
Year	Title	Role(s)	Notes
2005–2006	La fattoria	Opinionist	Reality show (seasons 2–3)
2008	La talpa	Opinionist	Reality show (season 3)
2009	Italian Academy	Judge	Reality competition
2010–2013	Pomeriggio Cinque	Opinionist	Talk show
2013	La guardiana del faro	Presenter	Talk show
2018	Celebrity MasterChef Italia	Contestant	Cooking competition
2020	Grande Fratello VIP	Contestant	Reality show
2020–2021	Ogni mattina	Opinionist	Talk show
2022	Alessandro Borghese: Celebrity Chef	Contestant	Cooking competition
