= The Nina B. Affair =

1961 film

- Directed by: Robert Siodmak
- Written by: Johannes Mario Simmel (novel); Roger Nimier; Jacques Robert; Robert Siodmak
- Produced by: Henri Baum; Georges Lourau
- Starring: Nadja Tiller; Pierre Brasseur; Walter Giller
- Cinematography: Michel Kelber
- Edited by: Henri Taverna
- Music by: Georges Delerue
- Production companies: Bavaria Film; Ciné-Alliance; Filmsonor
- Distributed by: Cinédis; Bavaria Film
- Release date: 7 June 1961
- Running time: 104 minutes
- Countries: France; West Germany
- Language: French

The Nina B. Affair (French: L'affaire Nina B., German: Affäre Nina B) is a 1961 French-West German drama film directed by Robert Siodmak and starring Nadja Tiller, Pierre Brasseur and Walter Giller.

The film's sets were designed by the art director Jean d'Eaubonne. It was shot at the Billancourt Studios in Paris and Bavaria Studios in Munich.

== Cast ==
- Nadja Tiller as Nina Berrera
- Pierre Brasseur as Berrera
- Walter Giller as Holden
- Charles Regnier as Schwerdtfeger
- Hubert Deschamps as Romberg
- Jacques Dacqmine as Dr. Zorn
- Maria Meriko as Mila
- André Certes as Falkenberg
- Nicolas Vogel as Von Knapp
- Ellen Bernsen as La secrétaire de Schwerdtfeger
- Marie Mergey as l’infirmière
- Guy Decomble as Lofting
- Philippe Forquet as Le fils de Schwerdtfeger
- Etienne Bierry as Dietrich
- José Luis de Vilallonga as Kurt
- Dominique Dandrieux as Micky

== Bibliography ==
- Deborah Lazaroff Alpi. Robert Siodmak: A Biography, with Critical Analyses of His Films Noirs and a Filmography of All His Works. McFarland,1998.
- Hans-Michael Bock and Tim Bergfelder. The Concise Cinegraph: An Encyclopedia of German Cinema. Berghahn Books, 2009.
