= L'enfance de l'art =

1988 film

- Film poster
- Directed by: Francis Girod
- Written by: Francis Girod; Yves Dangerfield
- Produced by: Ariel Zeitoun
- Starring: Clotilde de Bayser
- Cinematography: Dominique Chapuis
- Edited by: Geneviève Winding
- Music by: Romano Musumarra
- Distributed by: Acteurs Auteurs Associés
- Release date: 31 August 1988
- Running time: 107 minutes
- Country: France
- Language: French

L'enfance de l'art is a 1988 French drama film directed by Francis Girod. It was entered into the 1988 Cannes Film Festival.

== Cast ==
- Clotilde de Bayser – Marie
- Michel Bompoil – Simon
- Anne-Marie Philipe – Régine
- Yves Lambrecht – Jean-Paul
- Marie-Armelle Deguy – Ludivine
- Régine Cendre – Martine
- Bruno Wolkowitch – Samuel
- Etienne Pommeret – Lucas
- Yves Dangerfield – Philippe (as Vincent Vallier)
- Hélène Alexandridis – Juliette
- André Dussollier – Luc Ferrand
- Laurence Masliah – Valérie
- Pierre Gérard – Louis
- Olivia Brunaux – Lydia
- Judith Magre
- Dominique Besnehard
