= The Woman Cop =

- Directed by: Yves Boisset
- Written by: Yves Boisset; Claude Veillot
- Produced by: Alain Sarde
- Starring: Miou-Miou; Jean-Marc Thibault; Jean-Pierre Kalfon; François Simon
- Cinematography: Jacques Loiseleux
- Edited by: Albert Jurgenson
- Music by: Philippe Sarde
- Release date: 1980
- Country: France
- Box office: $13.6 million

The Woman Cop (French: La Femme flic) is a 1980 French film directed by Yves Boisset that stars Miou-Miou as an impetuous young police inspector whose disregard for the constraints under which police and prosecutors have to work leads to her dismissal.

== Plot ==
After publicly slapping a lawyer who she felt had let her down, Corinne Levasseur is transferred from the southern port city of Toulon and goes by train to a small mining town in the far north. Initially put on office work, she is then given what in the eyes of the local chief of police is an unimportant investigation. This leads her to uncover a network of child pornography and prostitution involving members and employees of the most important family of the town. She struggles with her boss and the public prosecutor to indict individuals against whom she has good evidence and witnesses, but they refuse to back her against such locally powerful people. On instructions from Paris, her chief hands her a letter of resignation to sign and with her bags she takes a taxi to the railway station.

== Cast and roles ==
- Miou-Miou - Inspector Corinne Levasseur
- Jean-Marc Thibault - Commissionner Porel
- Leny Escudéro - Diego Cortez
- Jean-Pierre Kalfon - Backmann, the director of the MJC
- François Simon - Doctor Godiveau
- Alex Lacast - Inspector Simbert
- Niels Arestrup - Dominique Allier, the photographer
- Henri Garcin - Le procureur
- Philippe Caubère - Abbot Henning
- Roland Amstutz - M. Muller
- Roland Bertin - Substitut Berthot
- Roland Blanche - Inspector Roc
- Stéphane Bouy - Commissaire Bonnard
- Philippe Brizard - Juge d'instruction in the South
- Gérard Caillaud - Juge d'instruction in the North
- Jean Martin - Colonel
- Mado Maurin - lodger
- Fred Personne - Corinne's father
- Michel Pilorgé - Inspector Castaing
