= Gloria (1977 film) =

1977 film

- Directed by: Claude Autant-Lara
- Written by: Claude Autant-Lara; Jean Halain
- Based on: Gloria; 1977 novel by Solange Bellegarde
- Produced by: Alain Poiré
- Starring: Nicole Maurey; Maurice Biraud; Andrée Tainsy
- Cinematography: Wladimir Ivanov
- Edited by: Monique Isnardon; Robert Isnardon
- Music by: Bernard Gérard
- Production companies: Gaumont; Production 2000
- Distributed by: Gaumont Distribution
- Release date: 14 September 1977
- Running time: 115 minutes
- Country: France
- Language: French

Gloria is a 1977 French drama film directed by Claude Autant-Lara and starring Nicole Maurey, Maurice Biraud and Andrée Tainsy. The film's sets were designed by the art director Max Douy. It was the director Autant-Lara's last film after a lengthy career in cinema and he turned to politics soon afterwards.

== Cast ==
- Valérie Jeannet as Gloria Laurier
- Sophie Grimaldi as Florence Laurier
- Nicole Maurey as Alice de Clermont
- Maurice Biraud as Stéphane Perreau
- Andrée Tainsy as Estelle - la gouvernante
- Dorothée Jemma as Lili Clape
- Alain Marcel as Jacques
- Jean-Luc Boisserie as Jacques enfant
- Grégoire Aslan as Le patron du cabaret
- Christian Alers as Le docteur
- Robert Dalban as L'aboyeur
- Jean Martinelli as Le grand-père de Jacques
- Valérie Mokhazni as Gloria Laurier enfant
- Pierre Zimmer as Hervé de Clermont
- Jean Lanier as Le colonel
- Jean Vinci as L'invité
- André Gaillard as Le présentateur du cabaret
- Antoine Marin as L'impresario
- Raymond Loyer as Le chauffeur d'Alice
- René Havard as Le chauffeur de taxi qui a fait la Marne
- Marcel Azzola as Un accordéoniste
- Joss Baselli as Un accordéoniste

== Bibliography ==
- Oscherwitz, Dayna & Higgins, MaryEllen. The A to Z of French Cinema. Scarecrow Press, 2009.
