= Daniel Ivernel =

French actor

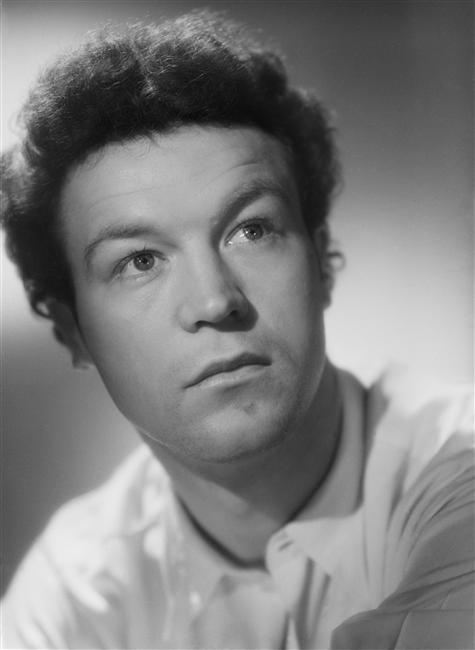
- Harcourt studio, 1947
- Born: 3 June 1920; Versailles, France
- Died: 11 November 1999 (aged 79); Paris, France
- Occupation: Actor
- Years active: 1947–1981

Daniel Ivernel (3 June 1920 – 11 November 1999) was a French film actor. He appeared in 50 films between 1947 and 1981.

== Filmography ==
Year	Title	Role	Notes
1947	The Beautiful Trip	Yvon	
1947	Criminal Brigade	Jean-Jacques	
1948	To the Eyes of Memory	Bordas, le radio	
1949	Manon	American Officer	Uncredited
1949	Le Sorcier du ciel	Georges Malray	
1950	La souricière	Un juré	Uncredited
1950	Plus de vacances pour le Bon Dieu	Le docteur	
1950	God Needs Men	François Guillen	
1951	Under the Sky of Paris	Georges Forestier	
1951	The Passerby	Jeanjean	
1952	The Smugglers' Banquet	Jef - le délégué syndical	
1952	Rayés des vivants	Pierre Baupré	
1952	Holiday for Henrietta	L'inspecteur de police Adrien Massar	
1954	The Count of Monte Cristo	Gaspard Caderousse (1) - (2)	
1954	Daughters of Destiny	Baretta	(segment "Jeanne")
1954	Stain in the Snow	Krommer	
1954	Ulysses	Eurylochus	
1954	Madame du Barry	Jean du Barry	
1955	Napoléon	Cambacérès	Uncredited
1957	S.O.S. Noronha	Mastic	
1959	The Female	Berthier	
1959	Marie-Octobre	Robert Thibaud - médecin-accoucheur	
1960	La Pendule à Salomon	Jean-Baptiste Rousse	
1961	Vive Henri IV... vive l'amour!	Le comte d'Anovar	Uncredited
1961	Par-dessus le mur		
1962	Sundays and Cybele	Carlos	
1962	Mandrin		
1962	La ligne droite		
1964	Diary of a Chambermaid	M Mauger	
1964	À couteaux tirés	Le commissaire Mattei	
1966	Paris in August	Civadusse	
1966	That Man George	Vibert	
1967	Mise à sac	Edgar	
1970	Borsalino	Le commissaire	
1971	Le Saut de l'ange	Le commissaire Pedrinelli	
1972	Il était une fois un flic...	Ligmann	
1972	Dr. Popaul	Dr. Berthier	
1972	Plot	Antoine Acconetti - un truand	
1972	Jean Vilar, une belle vie	Himself	
1973	The Dominici Affair	Le président de la cour d'Assises	
1974	The Holes	Le clochard	
1974	Borsalino & Co.	Inspector Fanti	
1975	Il faut vivre dangereusement	Badinget	
1976	Body of My Enemy	Victor Verbruck, le maire	
1977	Le Juge Fayard dit Le Shériff	Xavier Marcheron	
