= The Infernal Trio =

1974 film

- Theatrical release poster
- French: Le Trio infernal
- Directed by: Francis Girod
- Screenplay by: Francis Girod; Jacques Rouffio
- Based on: Le Trio infernal by Solange Fasquelle
- Produced by: Raymond Danon; Jacques Dorfmann; Wolfdieter von Stein
- Starring: Michel Piccoli; Romy Schneider; Mascha Gonska; Philippe Brizard; Francis Claude; Hubert Deschamps; Monica Fiorentini; Papinou
- Cinematography: Andréas Winding
- Edited by: Claude Barrois
- Music by: Ennio Morricone
- Production companies: Belstar Productions; Lira Films; Films 66; Les Productions Fox Europa; Oceania Produzioni Internazionali Cinematografiche; TIT Filmproduktion GmbH
- Distributed by: Fox-Lira (France); Cinerama Filmgesellschaft MBH (West Germany)
- Release dates: 22 May 1974 (France); 30 August 1974 (West Germany)
- Running time: 107 minutes
- Countries: France; Italy; West Germany
- Language: French

The Infernal Trio (French: Le Trio infernal; also known as Lady of Hell) is a 1974 crime comedy horror film directed by Francis Girod from a screenplay he co-wrote with Jacques Rouffio, based on the novel Le Trio infernal by Solange Fasquelle.

== Plot ==
The film opens in 1920s Marseiiles. As a comically tinny municipal band plays, middle-aged lawyer Georges Sarret is presented with a military medal in a pompous ceremony. A strikingly beautiful nurse-attendant demurely wheels a rich, elderly lady to the ceremony in a bath-chair. As her eyes meet Sarret’s, lingering speculatively, she fails to notice the old lady has slipped down in the chair, dead. The beautiful attendant is Philomena Schmidt, a now unemployed German, who falls into bed with Sarret, as he arranges her wedding to an older man so she can stay in France. After the wedding, Sarret also beds her sister Catherine, and a lustful ménage a trois develops.

The trio begin a career of insurance fraud. Catherine marries an elderly man called Deltreuil, while Sarret bribes Chambon, a dubious priest, to impersonate Deltreuil at the medical exam, and the gang, now including Chambon’s mistress Noémie, pull off a very profitable insurance fraud. Sarret decides to get rid of Chambon and Noémie, whom he shoots at a villa near Aix-en-Provence rented for the purpose. Sarret has already bought in carboys of sulphuric acid, and with the sisters’ help, the dead bodies are disposed of in two baths upstairs, and the ghastly, gooey residue painstakingly ladled and bucketed into a corner of the villa’s garden. This prolonged scene is the film’s grisly comic set-piece.

Appropriating Chambon’s assets, the trio share the loot, and Catherine departs for Paris, while Philomena returns to Sarret in Marseilles. When Catherine rejoins them, and with the money running low (we are now in the early 1930s), they embark on new swindles, by befriending and insuring the fragile lives of patients in a tuberculosis hospital. With Philomena posing as a charitable lady bountiful and Catherine as the maid, they persuade the hospital nuns to release a terminally ill young patient, Magali Herbin, into their care, where they pamper her with luxuries, casinos and high living.

Magali and Catherine start an affair; and then suddenly, as Sarret and Philomena dance, without explanation, Catherine’s body falls dead from an upper window. Distraught, Philomena attacks Sarret while Magali looks on, confused. At Catherine’s elaborate funeral procession, Sarret proposes to Philomena, and the film ends abruptly with their wedding on the Mairie steps, attended only by Magali and the photographer, deliberately echoing the previous similar wedding photos that featured earlier in the film.

== The real Georges Sarret and Infernal Trio ==
The film follows fairly accurately the general events in the real case of Georges Sarret and the Schmidt sisters, who were tried and convicted in Autumn 1933 at Aix-en-Provence, where Sarret was guillotined publicly on 10th April 1934. The characters’ real names are retained, although key details are adjusted to suit the film’s screenplay and aims.

For example, in real life, Catherine did not die as in the film, Magali was poisoned because she didn’t succumb to tuberculosis swiftly enough, and Sarret did not marry Philomena. The trio survived to be arrested, tried and convicted, the sisters serving long prison sentences and Sarret being executed. The Sarret case was a headline-grabbing sensation in 1930s France, with both trial and execution turning into something of a fiasco.

Director Francis Girod seems interested to stress, as does Solange Fasquelle’s novel on which the film draws, the amorality, cynicism and corruption of the trio and the society in which they operate. Beneath its period glamour, the film maintains a bleakly comic tone, with the brilliant support of Ennio Moricone’s score, even at the grimmest moments in a grim story.

A popular entry in true crime anthologies, the case of Georges Sarret was first written up in English by Roland Wild. This article was reprinted in the UK as a chapter in Murder in the 1930s and again in The Murder Casebook.

== Cast ==
- Michel Piccoli as Georges Sarret
- Romy Schneider as Philomena Schmidt
- Mascha Gonska as Catherine Schmidt
- Philippe Brizard as Chambon
- Jean Rigaux as Villette
- Monica Fiorentini as Magali
- Hubert Deschamps as Detreuil
- Monique Tarbès as the nurse
- Andréa Ferréol as Noémie
- Francis Claude as the doctor
- Pierre Dac as the insurance doctor
- Papinou as Luffeaux
- Henri Piccoli the violinist
