= The Blue Ferns =

1977 film

- Directed by: Françoise Sagan
- Written by: Françoise Sagan
- Produced by: Georges de Beauregard; Pierre Gauchet
- Starring: Françoise Fabian; Jean-Marc Bory; Gilles Ségal; Caroline Cellier; Francis Perrin
- Cinematography: Roland Dantigny
- Edited by: Chantal Delattre
- Music by: Frédéric Botton
- Production companies: Antenne 2; Les Films Corona; Bela Productions
- Distributed by: CFDC-UGC
- Release date: 25 May 1977
- Running time: 85 minutes
- Country: France
- Language: French

The Blue Ferns (French: Les fougères bleues) is a 1977 French drama film directed by Françoise Sagan and starring Françoise Fabian, Gilles Ségal and Jean-Marc Bory. It was one of the final films released by Les Films Corona. Sagan adapted the screenplay from her own short story.

During a hunting trip in the countryside two couples, one married the other a ladies man and his girlfriend, interact.

== Cast ==
- Françoise Fabian as Monika Berthier
- Jean-Marc Bory as Stanislas
- Gilles Ségal as Jérôme Berthier
- Caroline Cellier as Betty
- Francis Perrin as Antoine

== Bibliography ==
- Oscherwitz, Dayna & Higgins, MaryEllen . The A to Z of French Cinema. Scarecrow Press, 2009.
- Pallister, Janis L. French-speaking Women Film Directors: A Guide. Fairleigh Dickinson Univ Press, 1997.
