= Nadine Basile =

French actress

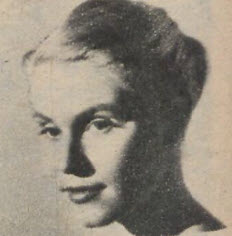
- Born: 1 April 1931; Paris, France
- Died: 29 June 2017 (aged 86); Lyon, France
- Occupation: Actress
- Years active: 1949-1989 (film & TV)

Nadine Basile (1931–2017) was a French stage, film and television actress. She was awarded the Prix Suzanne Bianchetti in 1952. She was married to the actor Jean Martinelli.

== Selected filmography ==
- The Sinners (1949)
- Under the Sky of Paris (1951)
- Love, Madame (1952)
- Crazy for Love (1952)
- Stain in the Snow (1954)
- Le feu dans la peau (1954)
- Wild Fruit (1954)
- Mademoiselle from Paris (1955)
- Black Dossier (1955)
- Twelve Hours to Live (1956)
- Ce soir les jupons volent... (1956)
- Sylviane de mes nuits (1957)
- Maigret Sets a Trap (1958)
- The Gendarme of Champignol (1959)
- Un couple (1960)
- Who Are You, Mr. Sorge? (1961)
- Tintin and the Lake of Sharks (1972)
- The Adolescent (1979)

== Bibliography ==
- Biggs, Melissa E. French films, 1945-1993: a critical filmography of the 400 most important releases. McFarland & Company, 1996.
- Goble, Alan. The Complete Index to Literary Sources in Film. Walter de Gruyter, 1999.
