= Marianne of My Youth =

1955 film

- Poster for the film.
- Directed by: Julien Duvivier
- Written by: Denise Van Moppès; Julien Duvivier; Peter von Mendelssohn
- Based on: Douloureuse Arcadie; 1932 novel by Peter von Mendelssohn
- Produced by: André Daven; Georges Lourau; Arys Nissotti; Pierre O'Connell; Frank Clifford; Ralph Baum
- Starring: Marianne Hold; Horst Buchholz; Pierre Vaneck
- Cinematography: Léonce-Henri Burel
- Edited by: Marthe Poncin; Lilian Seng
- Music by: Jacques Ibert
- Production companies: Filmsonor; Regina Films; Francinex; Royal-Produktion; Allfram-Film
- Distributed by: Cinédis; Allianz Film
- Release dates: 18 March 1955 (France); 8 April 1955 (W. Germany)
- Running time: 105 minutes
- Countries: France; West Germany
- Languages: French; German

Marianne of My Youth (French: Marianne de ma jeunesse, German: Marianne) is a 1955 French–West German romantic drama film directed by Julien Duvivier and starring Marianne Hold, Horst Buchholz and Pierre Vaneck. It was released in separate French language and German language versions. It is based on a 1932 novel Schmerzliches Arkadien by Peter von Mendelssohn.

It was shot at the Bavaria Studios in Munich and on location at Hohenschwangau Castle and at Schloss Fuschl in Salzburg. The film's sets were designed by the art directors Jean d'Eaubonne and Willy Schatz. Marcel Ophüls was the assistant director on the production.

== Cast ==
- Marianne Hold as Marianne
- Horst Buchholz as Vincent Loringer (German version)
- Pierre Vaneck as Vincent Loringer (French version)
- Gil Vidal as Manfred (French version)
- Udo Vioff as Manfred (German version)
- Jean Yonnel as Der Freiherr
- Friedrich Domin as Professor
- Jean Galland as Capitaine von Brower
- Michael Ande as Klein-Felix
- Claude Aragon as Jan
- Harry Hardt as Rittmeister von Brauer
- Ady Berber as Diener
- Serge Delmas
- Carl Simon as Gottvater
- Bert Brandt as Toby
- Gérard Fallec as Alexis
- Peter Vogel as Jan
- Isabelle Pia as Liselotte
- Jean-François Bailly as Reinhold
- Axel Scholtz as Franz
- Michael Verhoeven as Alexis
- Bernhard von der Planitz as Friedl
- Alexander von Richthofen as Florian
- Jacques de Féraudy as Dieu-le-Père

== Bibliography ==
- Ben McCann. Julien Duvivier. Manchester University Press, 2017.
