= Jean-Marc Bory =

Swiss actor

- Born: 17 March 1934; Noville, Switzerland
- Died: 31 March 2001 (aged 67); Belle-Ile-en-Mer, France
- Occupation: Actor
- Years active: 1955–1996

Jean-Marc Bory (17 March 1934 – 31 March 2001) was a Swiss actor. He appeared in 60 films and television shows between 1955 and 1996.

== Partial filmography ==
- Black Dossier (1955) - Juge Jacques Arnaud
- The Lovers (1958) - Bernard Dubois-Lambert
- Wolves of the Deep (1959) - Tenente
- Les loups dans la bergerie (1960) - Roger
- Austerlitz (1960) - Soult
- Il carro armato dell'8 settembre (1960) - Carlo Bollini
- Adorable Liar (1962) - Martin
- Where the Truth Lies (1962) - François Rauchelle
- Love on a Pillow (1962) - Pierre Leroy
- Ro.Go.Pa.G. (1963) - Husband (segment "Il nuovo mondo")
- Sweet and Sour (1963) - L'homme au micro
- A Sentimental Attempt (1963) - Dino
- Portuguese Vacation (1963) - Jean-Marc
- Triple Cross (1966) - Resistance Leader (uncredited)
- The Stranger (1967) - (uncredited)
- I visionari (1968)
- Una prostituta al servizio del pubblico e in regola con le leggi dello stato (1971) - François Coly
- Comptes à rebours (1971) - Ferrier
- Le Voyage (1972) - Pierre
- Au rendez-vous de la mort joyeuse (1973) - Marc
- Madame Baptiste (1974, TV Movie) - Le père
- Creezy (1974) - Savarin
- Jamais plus toujours (1976) - Mathieu
- Le Juge Fayard dit Le Shériff (1977) - Lucien Degueldre dit Monsieur Paul
- The Blue Ferns (1977) - Stanislas
- L'amour des femmes (1981) - Bruno
- Chaste and Pure (1981) - Dr. Natal
- L'amour braque (1985) - Simon Venin
- Derborence (1985) - Nendaz
- Le meilleur de la vie (1985) - Le père de Véronique
- Bernadette (1988) - Le curé Peyramale / Father Peyramale
- Marie de Nazareth (1995) - Pilate
