= Jean Martinelli =

French actor

- Born: Jean Siegfried Maria Martinet; 15 August 1909; Paris, France
- Died: 13 March 1983 (aged 72); Paris, France
- Occupation: Actor
- Years active: 1933–1983

Jean Martinelli (15 August 1909 – 13 March 1983) was a French actor who appeared in over 50 French films between 1933 and 1983, mostly in supporting roles. One of his few international films was Alfred Hitchcock's classic film To Catch a Thief (1955), in which he played the role of a one-legged waiter. Martinelli also worked in television and theatre. He was married to the actress Nadine Basile.

== Selected filmography ==
- The Two Orphans (1933) - Roger de Vaudray
- All for Love (1933) - Théo
- The Abbot Constantine (1933) - Jean Reynaud
- La dernière valse (1936) - Le comte Dimitri
- La loupiote (1937) - 'Jac' Jacques
- Blanchette (1937) - Georges Galoux
- The Red Dancer (1937) - Frantz
- La goualeuse (1938) - Pierre Duchemin
- The Charterhouse of Parma (1948) (uncredited)
- Dernière Heure, édition spéciale (1949) - L'avocat
- Le Furet (1950) - Moncey
- Death Threat (1950) - André Garnier
- La vie est un jeu (1951) - Le directeur du journal
- Wonderful Mentality (1953) - Jacques de Fleury
- The Three Musketeers (1953) - Athos
- La Belle de Cadix (1953) - dubbing (voice, uncredited)
- The Red and the Black (1954) - M. de Rénal
- To Catch a Thief (1955) - Mr. Mousse
- Madelon (1955) - Colonel Saint-Marc
- If Paris Were Told to Us (1956) - Henri IV / Firmin
- Women's Club (1956) - M. Mouss
- Police judiciaire (1958) - Le directeur de la P.J.
- The President (1961) - Un ministre
- Le bonheur est pour demain (1961) - Le Guen
- The Count of Monte Cristo (1961) - Vidocq
- The Gentleman from Epsom (1962) - Hybert
- Bonne nuit les petits (1963-1966; TV series) - Nounours
- Umorismo in nero (1965) - segment 1 'La Bestiole'
- Black Sun (1966) - Le curé
- The Jungle Book (1967) - Colonel Hathi and Shere Khan (French version)
- Tout le monde il est beau, tout le monde il est gentil (1972) - Le premier président
- Jeux pour couples infidèles (1972) - Le P.D.G. / Director
- Les anges (1973)
- La Bête (1975) - Cardinal Joseph de Balo
- The Twelve Tasks of Asterix (1976) - César (voice)
- The Diabolic (1977) - Carl Garnis (voice)
- Gloria (1977) - Le grand-père de Jacques
- Immoral Women (1979) - Pope
- Julien Fontanes, magistrat (1980) - Alain Lavernat
