= The Sinners (1949 film) =

1949 film

- Directed by: Julien Duvivier
- Written by: Julien Duvivier; Henri Jeanson
- Produced by: Arys Nissotti; Pierre O'Connell
- Starring: Serge Reggiani; Monique Mélinand; Suzy Prim
- Cinematography: Victor Arménise
- Edited by: Marthe Poncin
- Production companies: Regina; SIBIS
- Distributed by: Filmsonor Marceau
- Release date: 21 August 1949
- Running time: 108 minutes
- Country: France
- Language: French

The Sinners or In the Kingdom of Heaven (French: Au royaume des cieux) is a 1949 French romantic drama film directed by Julien Duvivier and starring Serge Reggiani, Monique Mélinand and Suzy Prim. It was shot at the Billancourt Studios in Paris and on location in the Loire-Atlantique department and around Étampes. The film's sets were designed by the art director René Moulaert. It premiered at the 1949 Venice Film Festival.

== Cast ==
- Serge Reggiani as Pierre Massot
- Jean Davy as Le curé Antonin
- Monique Mélinand as Mademoiselle Guérande
- Suzy Prim as Mademoiselle Chamblas
- Christiane Lénier as Dédée la Balafrée
- Suzanne Cloutier as Maria Lambert
- Nadine Basile as Gaby 'Facture'
- Liliane Maigné as Margot
- Colette Deréal as Lucienne
- Nicole Besnard as Anna
- Mistigri as Rosa
- Renée Cosima as Camille
- Sylvie Serliac as Henriette
- Ludmilla Hols as Clarisse
- Juliette Gréco as Rachel
- Janine Villard as Marcelle
- Thérèse Flore as Une pensionnaire de la Maison Haute Mère
- Violette Salvat as Adèle
- Caroline Carlotti as Fernande
- Suzanne Bernard as Une pensionnaire de la Maison Haute Mère
- Ketty Albertini as Paulette
- Jacqueline Bouckère as Irma
- Yvette Pécheux as Une pensionnaire de la Maison Haute Mère
- Florence Luchaire as Julie
- Joëlle Robin as Suzy
- Lyne Carrel as Une pensionnaire de la Maison Haute Mère
- Claude Mandel as Une pensionnaire de la Maison Haute Mère
- Paule Andral as Madame Bardin la Directrice
- Jane Morlet as Madame Rubini
- Lily Mounet as Madame Maupin
- Georgine Tisel as Mademoiselle Vendenasse
- Ève Morlot as Madame Dulot
- Andrée Tainsy as La fille de cuisine
- Mathilde Casadesus as Madame Barattier la Patronne de l'Auberge
- Max Dalban as Monsieur Barattier le Patron de l'Auberge
- Jacques Reynier as Le brigadier
- Louis Florencie as Premier gendarme
- Paul Faivre as Second gendarme
- Henri Coutet as Garrat le Camionneur
- Max Dejean as L'homme de la Digue
- Françoise Adam as Une pensionnaire de la Maison Haute Mère
- Annette as Une pensionnaire de la Maison Haute Mère
- Marie-Hélène Bailly as Une pensionnaire de la Maison Haute Mère
- Nadine Bellaigue as Une pensionnaire de la Maison Haute Mère
- Mireille Colussi as Une pensionnaire de la Maison Haute Mère
- Irène Daniel as Une pensionnaire de la Maison Haute Mère
- Jeanne Daury as Une pensionnaire de la Maison Haute Mère
- Monique Gérard as Une pensionnaire de la Maison Haute Mère
- Zaura Ilami as Une pensionnaire de la Maison Haute Mère
- Catherine Le Couey as Une pensionnaire de la Maison Haute Mère
- Monique Lénier as Une pensionnaire de la Maison Haute Mère
- Hélène Rémy as Une pensionnaire de la Maison Haute Mère
- Georgette Stephan as Une pensionnaire de la Maison Haute Mère
- Nadine Tallier as Une pensionnaire de la Maison Haute Mère
- Maurice Salabert as Un gendarme

== Bibliography ==
- Armes, Roy. French Cinema. Secker & Warburg, 1985/
- McCann, Ben. Julien Duvivier. Manchester University Press, 2017.
- Petrucci, Antonio. Twenty Years of Cinema in Venice. International Exhibition of Cinematographic Art, 1952.
- Rège, Philippe. Encyclopedia of French Film Directors, Volume 1. Scarecrow Press, 2009.
