= Estella Blain =

French actress (1930–1982)

- Born: Micheline Estellat; 30 March 1930; Paris, France
- Died: 1 January 1982 (aged 51); Port-Vendres, France
- Occupation: Actress
- Years active: 1954–1981
- Spouse: Gérard Blain (1953–1956) (divorced)

Estella Blain (born Micheline Estellat; 30 March 1930 – 1 January 1982) was a French actress. She appeared in more than twenty films from 1954 to 1981. She played the lead role in Hervé Bromberger's 1954 film Wild Fruit. Blain died by suicide on New Year's Day 1982.

== Filmography ==
Year	Title	Role	Notes
1954	Wild Fruit	Maria Manzana	
1954	Service Entrance	Une copine de Léo	
1955	Tant qu'il y aura des femmes		
1957	Les Collégiennes	Marthe Chevalier	
1958	Secrets of a French Nurse	Thérèse	
1959	The Tiger Attacks	Nadine Maroux	
1959	Les Dragueurs	Sylviane	
1959	The Road to Shame	Béatrice	
1960	Thunder in the Blood	Catherine	
1960	L'ennemi dans l'ombre	Violaine	
1960	Pirates of the Coast	Isabela Linares	
1960	The White Horse Inn	Klärchen Hinzelmann	
1961	Totòtruffa 62	Diana Peluffo	
1962	Le Tout pour le tout		
1965	La corde au cou	Hélène	
1966	Angelique and the King	De Montespan	
1966	The Diabolical Dr. Z	Nadia	
1966	Marvelous Angelique		
1967	Les têtes brûlées	Lucia	
1968	Love in the Night	Nicole	
1968	A Flea in Her Ear	Defendant	
1971	Çiplaklar	Young ve wonderful woman	
1972	Le franc-tireur	La femme	
1974	Love at the Top	Shirley Douglas	
