= Shéhérazade (1963 film) =

1963 film

- Film poster
- Directed by: Pierre Gaspard-Huit
- Written by: Pierre Gaspard-Huit; José Gutiérrez Maesso; Marc-Gilbert Sauvajon
- Produced by: Michel Safra; Serge Silberman; Georges Lourau
- Starring: Anna Karina; Gérard Barray; António Vilar
- Cinematography: André Domage; Christian Matras
- Edited by: Louisette Hautecoeur
- Music by: André Hossein
- Production companies: Ciné-Alliance; Dear Film Produzione; Filmsonor; Spéva Films; Tecisa
- Distributed by: Cinédis
- Release date: 15 May 1963 (France)
- Running time: 124 minutes
- Countries: France; Italy; Spain
- Language: French

Shéhérazade or Scorching Sands is a 1963 French adventure film directed by Pierre Gaspard-Huit and starring Anna Karina as the title character. The cast also featured Gérard Barray, António Vilar and Giuliano Gemma The film is loosely based on the One Thousand and One Nights. The film's sets and costumes were designed by the art director Georges Wakhévitch.

== Plot ==
Baghdad in the year 809. The city is ruled by the Caliph, Haroun-al-Rashid, to whom the beautiful and spiritual Scheherazade has been promised. Ambassadors of Charlemagne arrive in Baghdad to ask the Caliph for free access to the Christian holy sites. Among these envoys from the west is the knight Renaud Villecroix, who falls in love with her. The grand vizier, enemy of the Caliph, ambushes a traveling party and takes Scheherazade prisoner, threatening to cut off her head. Renaud saves her and flees into the desert with her.

== Cast ==
- Anna Karina as Shéhérazade
- Gérard Barray as Renaud de Villecroix
- António Vilar as Haroun-al-Raschid
- Giuliano Gemma as Didier
- Marilù Tolo as Shirin
- Fausto Tozzi as Barmak
- Gil Vidal - Thierry
- Jorge Mistral as Grand Vizir Zaccar
- Fernando Rey
- Joëlle LaTour as Anira
- Rafael Albaicín
- Karamoko Cisse
- María Calvi
- José Calvo
- Félix Fernández
- María Granada
- José Manuel Martín (as J.M. Martín)

== Release ==
The film was released in France on May 15, 1963.

It was the 46th top-grossing film of 1963 in France, where it sold 1,375,848 tickets at the box office. In Poland, it sold more than 2 million tickets, making it one of the thirteen highest-grossing foreign films in Poland as of 1968.
