= Death Threat (film) =

1950 film

- Directed by: Raymond Leboursier
- Written by: Raymond Leboursier
- Produced by: Yves Mounier
- Starring: Colette Darfeuil; Pierre Renoir; Jean Martinelli
- Cinematography: Georges Million
- Edited by: Madeleine Bonin
- Music by: Charly Bailly; André Varel
- Production company: Société Parisienne de l'Industrie Cinématographique
- Release date: 22 February 1950
- Running time: 92 minutes
- Country: France
- Language: French

Death Threat (French: Menace de mort) is a 1950 crime drama film directed by Raymond Leboursier and starring Colette Darfeuil, Pierre Renoir and Jean Martinelli. The film's sets were designed by the art director Roland Quignon. It is also known by the alternative title Aventure à Pigalle.

== Synopsis ==
During the German occupation a young pianist André Garnier is denounced to the Gestapo and arrested. Having survived the war he is determined to hunt down the informer. He meets and falls in love with Hélène, the girlfriend of an industrialist Bernier. André comes to suspect that Bernier is the man who informed on him to the authorities. When Bernier is murdered, André is a natural suspect for the revenge killing.

== Cast ==
- Colette Darfeuil as Hélène
- Pierre Renoir as Bernier
- Jean Martinelli as André Garnier
- Marcel Dalio as Denis
- Pierre Larquey as Morel
- Jacques Famery as Jacques
- Jeanne Fusier-Gir as Madame Jeanne
- Gérard Séty as Jean
- Paul Demange as Le valet de chambre
- Jacques Dynam as Pierre
- Jacques Henley as Le gérant
- Max Maxudian as Sanger
- Pauline Carton as Madame Auguste
- Colette Mars as Colette
- Robert Le Fort as Le maître d'hôtel

== Bibliography ==
- Rège, Philippe. Encyclopedia of French Film Directors, Volume 1. Scarecrow Press, 2009.
