= Peter von Mendelssohn =

German-British writer (1908–1982)

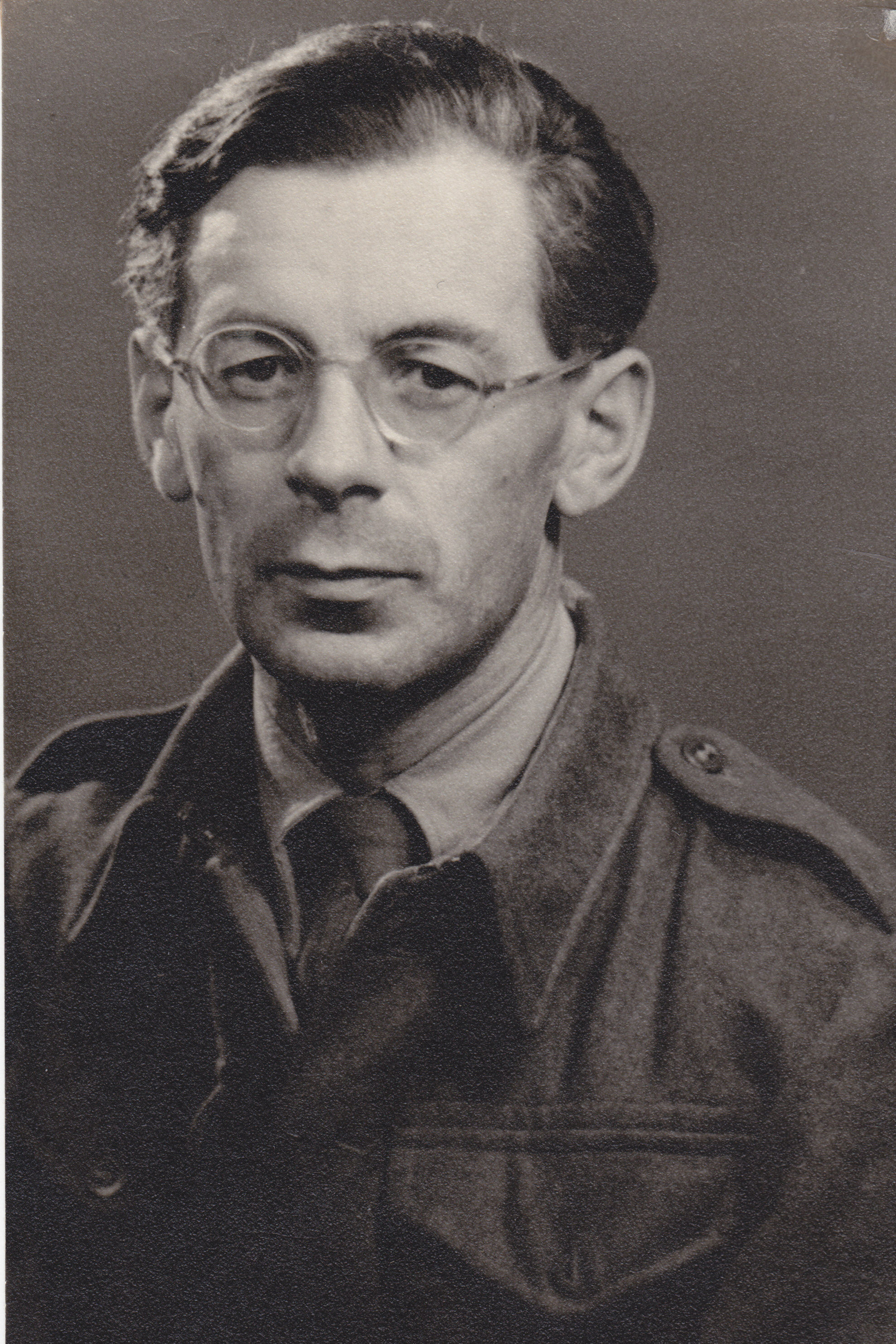
- Mendelssohn in 1945
- Born: 1 June 1908; Munich, Bavaria, German Empire
- Died: 10 August 1982 (aged 74); Munich, Bavaria, West Germany
- Other names: Peter Mendelssohn, Peter de Mendelssohn
- Occupations: Writer, historian, translator
- Years active: 1930–1982

Peter von Mendelssohn (1908–1982) was a German writer and historian. Of Jewish heritage, he was forced to leave Germany following the Nazi Party's rise to power in 1933. He became a prominent member of the exile community, along with figures such as Thomas Mann. In 1936 settled in Britain where he became a naturalised subject. His 1932 novel Schmerzliches Arkadien was adapted into a 1955 film Marianne of My Youth.

After the Second World War he served as a press officer with the Allied Control Council in Düsseldorf. He subsequently returned to live in Munich in 1970, where he died twelve years later. He was married to fellow exile and writer Hilde Spiel.

== Bibliography ==
- Volkmar Zuhlsdorff. Hitler's Exiles: The German Cultural Resistance in America and Europe. A&C Black, 2005.
