= Love in the Night =

1968 film

- Directed by: Marcel Camus
- Written by: Paul Andréota
- Produced by: Edmond Tenoudji; Georges Lourau; Serge Silberman
- Starring: Jacques Perrin; Catherine Jourdan; Georges Géret
- Cinematography: Jean Boffety
- Edited by: Andrée Feix
- Music by: Claude Bolling
- Production companies: Les Films Marceau; Spéva Films; Filmsonor; Variety Films
- Distributed by: Cocinor
- Release date: 10 June 1968
- Running time: 95 minutes
- Countries: France; Italy
- Language: French

Love in the Night (French: Vivre la nuit, Italian: La ragazza della notte) is a 1968 French-Italian drama film directed by Marcel Camus and starring Jacques Perrin, Catherine Jourdan and Georges Géret.

== Cast ==
- Jacques Perrin as Philippe
- Catherine Jourdan as Nora
- Georges Géret as Bourgoin
- Estella Blain as Nicole
- Serge Gainsbourg as Mathieu
- Venantino Venantini as Bollert
- Michel Creton as Jacky, le loubard
- Marcel Gassouk as Le chauffeur de Bourgoin
- Albert Minski as Minski
- François Patrice as François Patrice

== Bibliography ==
- Rège, Philippe. Encyclopedia of French Film Directors, Volume 1. Scarecrow Press, 2009.
