= Mad Sea =

1963 film

- Directed by: Renato Castellani
- Written by: Renato Castellani; Leo Benvenuti; Piero De Bernardi
- Produced by: Franco Cristaldi; Georges Lourau; Alexandre Mnouchkine
- Starring: Jean-Paul Belmondo; Gina Lollobrigida; Tomas Milian
- Cinematography: Antonio Secchi
- Edited by: Jolanda Benvenuti
- Music by: Carlo Rustichelli
- Production companies: Lux Film; Vides Cinematografica; Les Films Ariane; Filmsonor
- Distributed by: Cinédis; Paramount Italy
- Release date: 1 September 1963
- Running time: 119 minutes
- Countries: Italy; France
- Language: Italian
- Box office: 342,382 admissions (France)

Mad Sea (Italian: Mare matto, French: La Mer à boire, also known as Crazy Sea) is a 1963 Italian-French comedy-drama film directed by Renato Castellani. The film entered the competition at the 24th Venice International Film Festival.

== Cast ==
- Jean-Paul Belmondo as il Livornese
- Gina Lollobrigida as Margherita,
- Tomas Milian as Efisio Trombetta
- Odoardo Spadaro as Drudo Parenti
- Michele Abruzzo as Oreste
- Piero Morgia as Benedetto Lo Russo
- Pietro Tordi as Il Poeta
- Tano Cimarosa as Castelluzzo
- Anita Durante as Rosaria Lo Russo
- Lamberto Maggiorani as Marinaio
- Rossana Di Rocco as Nedda
- Noël Roquevert as L'avvocato
