= Madelon (film) =

1955 film

- Directed by: Jean Boyer
- Written by: Jean Boyer; Jacques Robert; Marc-Gilbert Sauvajon; Serge Veber
- Produced by: Georges Lourau; Alexandre Mnouchkine; Francis Rigaud
- Starring: Line Renaud; Jean Richard; Roger Pierre
- Cinematography: Charles Suin
- Edited by: Fanchette Mazin
- Music by: Louis Gasté
- Production companies: Filmsonor; Gallus Films; Les Films Ariane
- Distributed by: Cinédis
- Release date: 2 December 1955
- Running time: 90 minutes
- Country: France
- Language: French

Madelon (French: La Madelon) is a 1955 French comedy film directed by Jean Boyer and starring Line Renaud, Jean Richard and Roger Pierre. It is inspired by the popular song of the First World War "La Madelon" about Madelon, a waitress working in a country inn encountered by a group of soldiers.

The film's sets were designed by the art director Robert Giordani.

== Synopsis ==
In the First World War, Madeleine, a singing waitress who has become of the idol to the French Army travels up to Paris and the Western Front searching for her lover, encountering on the way a variety of different nationalities who make up the Allied forces.

== Cast ==
- Line Renaud as Madeleine Thullier, dite La Madelon
- Jean Richard as Antoine Pichot
- Roger Pierre as Le caporal Georges Beauguitte
- Pierre Larquey as Le curé
- Georges Chamarat as Auguste Thullier
- André Valmy as Le capitaine Van Meulen
- Gilbert Gil as Un commandant d'aviation chez Maxim's
- Jacques Dynam as Le chasseur de chez Maxim's
- Jean Martinelli as Le colonel de Saint-Marc
- Peter Walker as Un Américain
- Michèle Monty as Juliette
- Jess Hahn as Le général américain Gibson
- Émile Genevois as Le soldat Alfred
- Odette Barencey as Mme Thullier
- Edmond Chemi as Le gendarme qui arrête Antoine
- Michel Flamme as Un capitaine d'aviation chez Maxim's
- Jacques Hilling as Le soldat qui dort
- Daniel Ceccaldi as Un militaire chez Maxim's
- Georges Baconnet as M. Pichot
- Robert Dalban as L'adjudant La Tringle
- Robert Rollis as Julot
- Jean Carmet as Le soldat Mathieu
- Noël Roquevert as Le commandant Martin

== Bibliography ==
- Dayna Oscherwitz & MaryEllen Higgins. The A to Z of French Cinema. Scarecrow Press, 2009.
