= Wild Fruit =

- Directed by: Hervé Bromberger
- Written by: Jacques Berland; François Boyer; Hervé Bromberger; Max Gallai
- Based on: Notre rêve qui êtes aux cieux by Michel Durafour
- Produced by: Georges Agiman; Georges Lourau
- Starring: Estella Blain; Évelyne Ker; Nadine Basile
- Cinematography: Jacques Mercanton
- Edited by: Mitzi d' Esterno
- Music by: Joseph Kosma
- Production companies: Filmsonor; Les Films Agiman; Les Films Odeon
- Distributed by: Cinédis
- Release date: 29 January 1954
- Running time: 94 minutes
- Country: France
- Language: French

Wild Fruit (French: Les fruits sauvages) is a 1954 French drama film directed by Hervé Bromberger and starring Estella Blain, Évelyne Ker and Nadine Basile. It was shot at the Saint-Maurice Studios in Paris and distributed by Cinédis.

== Synopsis ==
Maria kills her father in order to stop him forcing her younger sister Christine into prostitution. The family flee to small village in Provence but are eventually tracked down by the police.

== Cast ==
- Estella Blain as Maria Manzana
- Évelyne Ker as Christine Manzana
- Marianne Lecène as Anna
- Nadine Basile as Françoise
- Jean-Pierre Bonnefous as José Manzana
- Roger Dumas as Hans
- Jacques Moulières as Frédéric
- Michel Reynald as Michel Manzana
- Talina Sauser as Lolita
- Norbert Pierlot as Le berger
- Marco Villa as Forgeau
- Albert Rémy as Louis
- Georges Chamarat as Manzana

== Awards ==
1954 Locarno International Film Festival

- Won: Golden Leopard
