= The Blonde Gypsy =

1953 film

- Directed by: Jacqueline Audry
- Written by: Paul Ricard
- Produced by: Paul Ricard
- Starring: Tilda Thamar; Roger Pigaut; Gérard Landry
- Cinematography: Marcel Weiss
- Edited by: Marguerite Beaugé; Yvonne Martin
- Music by: Francis Lopez
- Production company: Protis Films
- Distributed by: Les Films Fernand Rivers
- Release date: 20 September 1953
- Running time: 103 minutes
- Country: France
- Language: French

The Blonde Gypsy (French: La Caraque blonde) is a 1953 French drama film directed by Jacqueline Audry and starring Tilda Thamar, Roger Pigaut and Gérard Landry.

== Cast ==
- Tilda Thamar as Myra Milagros
- Roger Pigaut as Antoine
- Gérard Landry as Pedro
- Orane Demazis as Alida Roux
- Roland Armontel as Polyte Roux
- Antonin Berval as Léon Barcarin
- France Degand as Ginou Barcarin
- Didier d'Yd as Jean Roux
- René Hiéronimus
- Henri Poupon as Le père Barcarin
- Max Boumendil as Esprit
- Josselin
- Henri Arius
- François Vibert

== Bibliography ==
- Janis L. Pallister & Ruth A. Hottell. Francophone Women Film Directors: A Guide. Fairleigh Dickinson Univ Press, 2005.
