= Gilles Ségal =

French actor and playwright (1929–2014)

- Born: 13 January 1929; Fălticeni, Romania
- Died: 11 June 2014 (aged 85); France
- Occupations: Actor, playwright
- Years active: 1954-2010

Gilles Ségal (13 January 1929 – 11 June 2014) was a French actor, mime, and playwright. He performed on stage with Marcel Marceau, and in more than sixty films since 1954. He was born in Fălticeni, Romania. Among his most notable roles is that of one of the heist participants in Jules Dassin's Topkapi.

== Filmography ==
Film
Year	Title	Role	Notes
1964	Topkapi	Giulio the Human Fly	
1965	Tretya molodost	Marius Petipa	
1967	Ó, Sol		
1968	Happening		
1969	A Walk with Love and Death	Entertainer	
1969	The Madwoman of Chaillot	Deaf Mute	
1970	The Confession		
1971	Léa l'hiver	Jacques	
1971	Una stagione all'inferno		
1971	Without Apparent Motive	Di Bozzo	
1972	Lettres de Stalingrad	Paul	
1972	Le droit d'aimer	Marc	
1973	The Hostage Gang	Serge Donati	
1973	Ras le bol	Le capitaine Luxembourg	
1973	Le mariage à la mode		
1974	Going Places	Man at the Bowling	Uncredited
1976	Les fleurs du miel	Michel / Le mari-The husband	
1977	The Blue Ferns	Jérôme Berthier	
1977	L'ombre et la nuit	Le prisonnier	
1978	Mon premier amour	Le professeur	
1980	Bobo la tête	J.P. Lemercier	
1982	Ils appellent ça un accident	Le docteur Fabre	
1982	Enigma		
1987	Le jupon rouge	Dr. Glazman	
1991	Le coup suprême	Le prof de patin	
1994	Lumière noire	L'insoecteur Cadin	
1998	Watani, un monde sans mal		
2004	En ce temps-là, l'amour...	L'homme	
2005	Nina's House	Dr. Weill	
2010	Une exécution ordinaire	Oncle Anton	
