= Les Collégiennes =

1957 film by André Hunebelle

- Directed by: André Hunebelle
- Written by: Jacques Lancien; Jean Lambertie; Arlette Reinerg
- Produced by: Lucien Masson; René Thévenet
- Starring: Marie-Hélène Arnaud; Christine Carère; Estella Blain; Gaby Morlay; Henri Guisol
- Cinematography: Paul Cotteret
- Edited by: Jean Feyte
- Music by: Jean Marion
- Production companies: Sirius Films; Contact Organisation
- Distributed by: Sirius Films
- Release date: May 3, 1957 (France)
- Running time: 88 minutes
- Country: France
- Language: French

Les Collégiennes (English: The Twilight Girls) is a 1957 comedy-drama directed by André Hunebelle and starring Marie-Hélène Arnaud, Christine Carère and Estella Blain. It is the film debut of Catherine Deneuve (credited as Catherine Dorléac).

== Cast ==
- Marie-Hélène Arnaud as Catherine Royer
- Christine Carère as Monique
- Estella Blain as Martha
- Gaby Morlay as Madame Ancelin
- Henri Guisol as Christian Brenner
- Véronique Verlhac as Solange
- Agnès Laurent as Anne-Marie
- Paul Guers as Gilles Mareuil
- Sophie Daumier as Nicole
- Jacqueline Corot as Sophie
- Anna Gaylor as Geneviève
- Anita Treyens as Betty
- Sylvie Dorléac as Adélaïde
- Madeleine Barbulée as Madame Letellier
- Made Siamé as Supervisor of the Girls
- Elga Andersen as Hélène
- Fernand Fabre as Doctor
- Catherine Deneuve as Schoolgirl
- Gérard Barray as Television Journalist
- Yvonne Monlaur as Older Girl
- Georgina Spelvin as Topless Girl #2 (US Insert, Uncredited)
- Louisa Colpeyn
- Marcelle Hainia

== Release ==
The film was released in France in 1957 by Sirius Films and in America in 1961 by Audubon Films, for which the film was dubbed and re-edited and additional footage added by Radley Metzger, making the film more explicit.
