= Le Juge Fayard dit Le Shériff =

- Theatrical release poster
- French: Le Juge Fayard dit Le Shériff
- Directed by: Yves Boisset
- Written by: Yves Boisset; Claude Veillot
- Produced by: Lise Fayolle; Yves Gasser; Yves Peyrot
- Starring: Patrick Dewaere; Aurore Clément
- Cinematography: Jacques Loiseleux
- Edited by: Albert Jurgenson; Laurence Leininger
- Music by: Philippe Sarde
- Distributed by: Compagnie Commerciale Française Cinématographique (CCFC)
- Release date: 12 January 1977
- Running time: 112 minutes
- Country: France
- Language: French
- Box office: $13.2 million

Le Juge Fayard dit Le Shériff ("Judge Fayard, called The Sheriff") is a 1977 French crime film written and directed by Yves Boisset. The film was inspired by the death of François Renaud.

== Cast ==
- Patrick Dewaere as le juge Fayard
- Aurore Clément as Michèle Louvier
- Philippe Léotard as l'inspecteur Marec
- Michel Auclair as Simon Pradal, le Docteur
- Jean Bouise as le procureur général Arnould
- Daniel Ivernel as Marcheron
- Jean-Marc Bory as Monsieur Paul, alias Lucien Degueldre
- Marcel Bozzuffi as Joanno
- Carole Lange (a.k.a. Carole Achache) as Cathy Davoust

== Production ==
The film was shot in Saint-Étienne in 1976.
