= A Mistress for the Summer =

1960 film

- Directed by: Édouard Molinaro
- Written by: Maurice Clavel; Édouard Molinaro
- Based on: Une fille pour l'été by Maurice Clavel
- Produced by: Jacques Bernard-Levy; Louis Bernard-Levy; Yvon Guézel; Georges Lourau
- Starring: Pascale Petit; Micheline Presle; Michel Auclair
- Cinematography: Jean Bourgoin
- Edited by: Monique Isnardon; Robert Isnardon
- Music by: Georges Delerue
- Production companies: Boréal Films; Filmsonor; SpA Cinematografica
- Distributed by: Cinédis (France); CEI Incom (Italy)
- Release date: 26 February 1960
- Running time: 80 minutes
- Countries: France; Italy
- Language: French

A Mistress for the Summer (French: Une fille pour l'été) is a 1960 French-Italian comedy film directed by Édouard Molinaro and starring Pascale Petit, Micheline Presle and Michel Auclair. It was shot at the Victorine Studios in Nice and on location around Antibes and Saint-Tropez. The film's sets were designed by the art director Georges Lévy.

== Synopsis ==
Every year the jaded painter Philippe goes to stay at the villa of the socialite Paule on the French Riviera. This year he brings along the vivacious Manette, who is wowed by the luxurious lifestyle. Paule hopes that Philippe can persuade her idealistic Zionist son, to be more cynical in life. However it is Manette who he seems more drawn to.

== Cast ==
- Pascale Petit as Manette
- Micheline Presle as Paule
- Michel Auclair as Philippe
- Aimé Clariond as Rosenkrantz
- Marina Malfatti as L'étrangère
- Bernard Lajarrige as Le barman
- Antoine Balpêtré as Le poète
- Claire Maurier as Viviane
- Henri Vidon as Le roi
- Nicole Nantheuil as Brigitte
- Ida Galli as Annette
- Giuseppe Porelli as Jérôme
- Georges Poujouly as Michel

== Bibliography ==
- Bessy, Maurice & Chirat, Raymond. Histoire du cinéma français: 1956-1960. Pygmalion, 1986.
- Rège, Philippe. Encyclopedia of French Film Directors, Volume 1. Scarecrow Press, 2009.
