= Madame du Barry (1954 film) =

1954 film

- Directed by: Christian-Jaque
- Written by: Henri Jeanson; Albert Valentin; Christian-Jaque
- Produced by: Robert Chabert; Francis Cosne; Georges Dancigers; Georges Lourau; Alexandre Mnouchkine; Angelo Rizzoli
- Starring: Martine Carol; Daniel Ivernel; Gianna Maria Canale
- Cinematography: Christian Matras
- Edited by: Jacques Desagneaux
- Music by: Georges Van Parys
- Production companies: Filmsonor; Francinex; Les Films Ariane; Rizzoli Film
- Distributed by: Cinédis
- Release date: 13 October 1954
- Running time: 106 minutes
- Countries: France; Italy
- Language: French

Madame du Barry is a 1954 French-Italian historical drama film directed by Christian-Jaque and starring Martine Carol, Daniel Ivernel, Gianna Maria Canale and Jean Parédès. The film depicts the life of Madame du Barry, mistress to Louis XV in the 18th century. It was shot at the Saint-Maurice Studios in Paris. The film's sets were designed by the art director Robert Gys.

== Cast ==
- Martine Carol as Jeanne Bécu
- Daniel Ivernel as Jean du Barry
- Gianna Maria Canale as Duchesse de Grammont
- Jean Parédès as Lebel
- Denis d'Inès as Duc d'Richelieu
- Marguerite Pierry as Comtesse de Médarne
- Isabelle Pia as Marie Antoinette
- Pascale Roberts as Jeanne's friend
- Nadine Alari as La Maréchale de Guichelais
- Giovanna Ralli as Cadette
- Georgette Anys as La citoyenne
- Nadine Tallier as Loque
- Nane Germon as Bitchi du Barry
- Suzanne Grey as Chon du Barr
- Claude Sylvain as Une fille
- Paul Demange as Un citoyen
- André Bervil as Un musicien
- Michel Etcheverry as L'abbé de Beauvais
- Serge Grand as Louis XVI
- Olivier Mathot as Molet
- Robert Murzeau as Un seigneur
- Gabrielle Dorziat as La Gourdan
- Massimo Serato as Choiseul
- Umberto Melnati as Curtins
- Noël Roquevert as Guillaume du Barry
- André Luguet as Louis XV
- Marcelle Praince as Mme du Barry, mère

== Bibliography ==
- Hayward, Susan (2010). French Costume Drama of the 1950s: Fashioning Politics in Film. Intellect Books.
