= Cinédis =

French film company

Company's logo from the beginning of Elena and Her Men.

Cinédis was a French film distribution company active from the 1930s to the 1960s, releasing a mixture of French films and dubbed imports from abroad. The company enjoyed its strongest years during the 1950s, when French audience numbers reached their peak. It handled a number of co-productions between France and Italy. The artist René Ferracci designed many of the company's posters.

== Selected filmography ==
- Colomba (1933)
- A Man of Gold (1934)
- The Imberger Mystery (1935)
- Thirteen Days of Love (1935)
- Holiday for Henrietta (1952)
- The Wages of Fear (1953)
- Ali Baba and the Forty Thieves (1954)
- House of Ricordi (1954)
- Wild Fruit (1954)
- Knave of Hearts (1954)
- Flesh and the Woman (1954)
- Madame du Barry (1954)
- Marianne of My Youth (1955)
- Black Dossier (1955)
- Spring, Autumn and Love (1955)
- Les Diaboliques (1955)
- Don Camillo's Last Round (1955)
- The Grand Maneuver (1955)
- Madelon (1955)
- Race for Life (1955)
- Elena and Her Men (1956)
- L'homme aux clefs d'or (1956)
- Paris, Palace Hotel (1956)
- Fernandel the Dressmaker (1956)
- Le secret de soeur Angèle (1956)
- Death in the Garden (1956)
- Women's Club (1956)
- He Who Must Die (1957)
- Sait-on jamais (1957)
- Mademoiselle et son gang (1957)
- Sénéchal the Magnificent (1957)
- Nous autres à Champignol (1957)
- À pied, à cheval et en voiture (1957)
- Porte des Lilas (1957)
- Les Espions (1957)
- Quand la femme s'en mêle (1957)
- Une manche et la belle (1957)
- La Parisienne (1957)
- The Innocent with Forty Children (1957)
- Anna of Brooklyn (1958)
- Cette nuit là... (1958)
- La legge è legge (1958)
- En cas de malheur (1958)
- Too Late to Love (1959)
- Du rififi chez les femmes (1959)
- The Gendarme of Champignol (1959)
- Maigret and the Saint-Fiacre Case (1959)
- Fortunat (1960)
- Classe Tous Risques (1960)
- Katia (1960)
- A Mistress for the Summer (1960)
- Wasteland (1960)
- Rendezvous (1961)
- The Nina B. Affair (1961)
- All the Gold in the World (1961)
- The Devil and the Ten Commandments (1962)
- Emile's Boat (1962)
- Jules and Jim (1962)
- How to Succeed in Love (1962)
- The Trip to Biarritz (1963)
- Mad Sea (1963)
- Shéhérazade (1963)

== Bibliography ==
- Smith, Ian Hayden. Selling the Movie: The Art of the Film Poster. Quarto Publishing Group, 2018.
