= Holiday for Henrietta =

1952 film

- Directed by: Julien Duvivier
- Written by: Julien Duvivier; Henri Jeanson
- Produced by: José Bosch; Georges Lourau; Arys Nissotti; Pierre O'Connell
- Starring: Dany Robin; Michel Auclair; Hildegard Knef
- Cinematography: Roger Hubert
- Edited by: Marthe Poncin
- Music by: Georges Auric
- Production companies: Filmsonor; Regina Films
- Distributed by: Cinédis
- Release date: 17 December 1952
- Running time: 118 minutes
- Country: France
- Language: French

Holiday for Henrietta (French: La fête à Henriette) is a 1952 French comedy film directed by Julien Duvivier and starring Dany Robin, Michel Auclair, and Hildegard Knef. It was shot at the Billancourt Studios and on location around Paris including at the Gaumont-Palace cinema. The film's sets were designed by the art director Jean d'Eaubonne. Holiday for Henrietta was remade in English as the 1964 film Paris When It Sizzles, starring William Holden and Audrey Hepburn, which also featured d'Eaubonne as art director.

== Synopsis ==
While urgently trying to develop a screenplay for a new film, two screenwriters, the downbeat Crémieux and the optimist Seignier, create contradictory storylines as they argue, and as each takes turns in taking the narrative forward, they force the lead characters Henriette and Maurice into weird situations. The film switches back and forth between the writers at home and the film as it develops according to their ideas.

== Cast ==
- Dany Robin as Henriette
- Michel Auclair as Marcel
- Hildegard Knef as Rita Solar
- Louis Seigner as script writer
- Micheline Francey as Nicole, script girl
- Henri Crémieux as script writer
- Michel Roux as Robert
- Daniel Ivernel as detective
- Odette Laure as Valentine
- Jeannette Batti as Gisèle
- Liliane Maigné as the cigarette girl
- Geneviève Morel as the concierge
- Don Ziegler as the American

== Bibliography ==
- Crisp, Colin. French Cinema—A Critical Filmography: Volume 2, 1940–1958. Indiana University Press, 2015.
