= Liliane Maigné =

French actress (1928–2004)

- Born: 1 March 1928; France
- Died: 20 December 2004 (aged 76); France
- Occupation: Actress
- Years active: 1941-1958

Liliane Maigné (1 March 1928 – 20 December 2004) was a French actress.

== Biography ==
Liliane Maigné was born 1 March 1928. Her father was André Maigné (1903–1936), her mother Madeleine Paroissien (1908–1983). She married Jean-Charles Tacchella in 1950. The couple had two children, and divorced 1956.

== Filmography ==
- Le Corbeau (1943)
- Cecile Is Dead (1944)
- The Sinners (1949)
- Nous sommes toutes des assassins (1952)
- La fête à Henriette (1952)
- Quintuplets in the Boarding School (1953)
