= Le Bon Plaisir =

- Directed by: Francis Girod
- Written by: Francis Girod; Françoise Giroud (novel)
- Produced by: Ariel Zeitoun
- Starring: Catherine Deneuve; Jean-Louis Trintignant; Michel Serrault
- Cinematography: Jean Penzer
- Edited by: Genevieve Winding
- Music by: Georges Delerue
- Distributed by: MK2
- Release date: 18 January 1984
- Running time: 102 minutes
- Country: France
- Language: French
- Box office: $7,325,880

Le Bon Plaisir is a 1984 French film directed by Francis Girod. The film relates the story of the efforts of a President of the French Republic (Jean-Louis Trintignant) informed, after a number of years, of the existence of a son born from an extramarital relationship with Claire (Catherine Deneuve), a former mistress, to cover up any kind of proof likely to tarnish his reputation using the secret service.

== Cast ==
- Catherine Deneuve as Claire Després
- Jean-Louis Trintignant as The President
- Michel Serrault as Minister of the Interior
- Hippolyte Girardot as Pierre
- Michel Auclair as Herbert
- Alexandra Stewart as Julie Hoffman
- Claude Winter as The First Lady
- Michel Boisrond as The First Minister

== Discography ==
The CD soundtrack composed by Georges Delerue.
