= Michel de Ré =

- Born: Michel-Alexandre-Jean-Lucien Gallieni; 25 February 1925; 7th arrondissement of Paris
- Died: 15 March 1979 (aged 54); 2nd arrondissement of Paris
- Occupations: Actor, theatre director
- Spouse(s): Heddy Einstein, Martine Sarcey

Michel de Ré (French pronunciation: [miʃɛl də ʁe]; 25 February 1925 - 15 March 1979) was a French actor and theatre director. A grandson of Marshal Joseph Gallieni, he was until 1950 the husband of Heddy Einstein, daughter of the painter William Einstein, and afterwards compagnon of the comedian Martine Sarcey.

== Selected filmography ==
- Black Sun (1966)
- Paris in August (1966)
