= Maigret and the Saint-Fiacre Case =

1959 film

- Directed by: Jean Delannoy
- Written by: Jean Delannoy; Rodolphe-Maurice Arlaud; Michel Audiard
- Based on: Maigret Goes Home by Georges Simenon
- Produced by: Jean-Paul Guibert; Robert Gascuel; Georges Lourau; Goffredo Lombardo
- Starring: Jean Gabin; Valentine Tessier; Michel Auclair; Robert Hirsch
- Cinematography: Louis Page
- Edited by: Henri Taverna
- Music by: Jean Prodromidès
- Production companies: Filmsonor; Intermondia Films; Cinétel; Pretoria Film; Titanus
- Distributed by: Cinédis
- Release date: 2 September 1959
- Running time: 101 minutes
- Countries: France; Italy
- Language: French

Maigret and the Saint-Fiacre Case (French: Maigret et l'affaire Saint-Fiacre) is a 1959 French-Italian crime film directed by Jean Delannoy and starring Jean Gabin, Valentine Tessier and Michel Auclair. Gabin appears as the fictional police detective Jules Maigret. Adapted from the novel l'Affaire Saint-Fiacre by the Belgian writer Georges Simenon, it tells how Maigret goes privately to the aid of his late father's employer who has received an anonymous death threat and, though unable to prevent the death, unmasks the plotters.

It was shot at the Epinay Studios in Paris and on location at various sites including around Seine-et-Marne and Yvelines. The film's sets were designed by the art director René Renoux.

== Plot ==
Commissioner Maigret returns to Saint-Fiacre, the village he grew up in, where his father had been estate manager for the family owning the château. The widowed countess has asked him to come urgently because she has received an anonymous letter saying she will die next day, which is Ash Wednesday. He finds the château in a sorry state: its contents are being systematically sold by the countess' young assistant Sabatier and its lands by the current estate manager Gautier and his young son Émile, a bank clerk. They say they are doing this to fund the countess' son Maurice, an alcoholic playboy who rarely visits his now-sick mother.

Early next morning the countess goes to mass at the village church where, on returning to her pew after receiving the sacrament, she falls dead. The local doctor Bouchardon is not surprised, telling Maigret that her heart was weak and that she died of natural causes. When that day's local paper arrives, the front page reports that the young count Maurice killed himself in Paris the day before. But Maurice is in fact alive and has rushed back on learning of his mother's death. Ringing the newspaper, Maigret is told that the report was phoned in last thing without time to check.

Now convinced of a plot to rob and kill the countess, whose young favourite he had once been, Maigret starts his own investigation of what caused her sudden death and who wanted her dead. On returning to her pew she had opened her missal, which has disappeared. He finds it hidden in the sacristry and pasted in it is the newspaper report of her son's suicide. At the time of her death the day's newspapers had not reached the village shop, so somebody brought the cutting from the town where the paper was printed.

Without revealing his hand, Maurice has also been investigating and, while his mother's body is still lying upstairs, organises a macabre dinner party for those he suspects. At it, Maigret accuses both the doctor and the assistant of negligence, but not homicide, and then reveals that the plotters were the manager and his son, who sought to cut out Maurice and enrich themselves. He calls the local police to take them away.

== Cast ==
- Jean Gabin as Commissioner Maigret
- Michel Auclair as Maurice de Saint-Fiacre
- Valentine Tessier as Countess de Saint-Fiacre
- Robert Hirsch as Lucien Sabatier
- Paul Frankeur as Doctor Bouchardon
- Michel Vitold as Father Jodet, the parish priest
- Camille Guérini as Gautier, the estate manager
- Serge Rousseau as Émile Gautier, the manager's son
- Jacques Morel as Maître Mauléon
- Gabrielle Fontan as Marie Tatin - l'épicière
- Jean-Pierre Granval as Le journaliste
- Jacques Hilling as Le garçon de café bavard
- Micheline Luccioni as Arlette - une prostituée
- Jacques Marin as Albert - le chauffeur
- Armande Navarre as Myriam
- Marcel Pérès as Le sacristain
- Hélène Tossy as Adèle Gaultier

== Bibliography ==
- Grant, John. A Comprehensive Encyclopedia of Film Noir: The Essential Reference Guide. Rowman & Littlefield, 2023.
- Harriss, Joseph. Jean Gabin: The Actor Who Was France. McFarland, 2018.
