= Michel Mitrani =

French film director and screenwriter

Michel Mitrani (1930 - 1996) was a French film director and screenwriter. He was the founder of the Festival International de Programmes Audiovisuels in 1987. His 1974 film Les Guichets du Louvre was entered into the 24th Berlin International Film Festival.

== Selected filmography ==
- L'Invité clandestin (Director) (1990)
- Monsieur de Pourceaugnac (Director) (1985)
- Un balcon en forêt (Director) (1978)
- Les Guichets du Louvre (Director/Screenwriter) (1974)
- La Nuit des Bulgares (Director/Screenwriter) (1971)
- La Cavale (Director/Screenwriter) (1971)
