= Francis Girod =

French film director

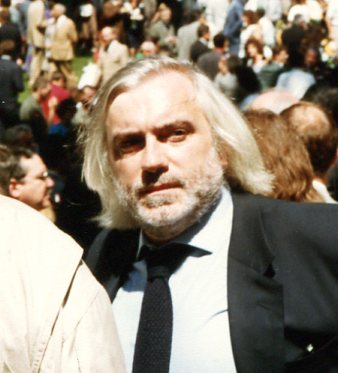
- Francis Girod (1990)
- Born: 9 October 1944; Semblançay, France
- Died: 19 November 2006 (aged 62); Bordeaux, France
- Occupations: Film director, actor, screenwriter
- Years active: 1967–2006

Francis Girod (French: [fʁɑ̃sis ʒiʁo]; 9 October 1944 – 19 November 2006) was a French film director, actor, and screenwriter. He directed 20 films between 1974 and 2006. His film L'enfance de l'art was entered into the 1988 Cannes Film Festival. In 1994 he was a member of the jury at the 44th Berlin International Film Festival.

== Selected filmography ==
- Slogan, directed by Pierre Grimblat (1969) - screenwriter, along with Pierre Grimblat and Melvin Van Peebles
- Le Trio infernal (1974)
- Rene the Cane (1977)
- The Savage State (1978)
- The Lady Banker (1980)
- The Big Brother (1982)
- Le Bon Plaisir (1984)
- Descente Aux Enfers (1986)
- Mon beau-frère a tué ma soeur, directed by Jacques Rouffio (1986) – actor
- L'enfance de l'art (1988)
- Lumière and Company (1995)
- Passage à l'acte (1996)
- Terminale (1998)
- Un ami parfait (2006)
