= Boulogne Studios =

Film studios located in Paris

The Boulogne Studios (French: Studios de Boulogne) are a film studio complex located in the Boulogne-Billancourt suburb of the French capital Paris. It should not be confused with the nearby Billancourt Studios.

They studios were constructed in 1941 during the Occupation of Paris but the German authorities prevented production from taking place, confiscating it for other purposes. It was only with the Liberation in 1944 that they came fully into use. In 1948 they underwent expansion with further sound stages built on adjacent land.

In the post-war era they were one of the leading French studios, and hosted a number of Hollywood's runaway productions The studios were particularly effective for Eastmancolor, due to the high electrical output which maximised the lighting.

== Bibliography ==
- Crisp, C.G. The Classic French Cinema, 1930–1960. Indiana University Press, 1993.
- Hayward, Susan. French Costume Drama of the 1950s: Fashioning Politics in Film. Intellect Books, 2010.
- Steinhart, Daniel. Runaway Hollywood: Internationalizing Postwar Production and Location Shooting. University of California Press, 2019.
