= Bleu Nuit =

Canadian softcore pornography television series

Bleu Nuit (English: "Midnight Blue") is a television series that was broadcast late night on the Télévision Quatre Saisons, or TQS, television network (now called Noovo) in Quebec, Canada, from 1986 until 2007. The content of the series was softcore pornography, mostly European films. The series was popular with both francophones and anglophones living in Quebec, as well as in other provinces in Canada that received the network. Bleu Nuit was considered a mainstay part of Québécois culture.

== Films shown on Bleu Nuit ==
- L'amour propre ne le reste jamais très longtemps (1985)
- Beau-père (Stepfather), (1981) Note: it was the broadcasting block's debut film on Bleu Nuit broadcast on September 13, 1986, six days after the channel station's launch.
- Black Emanuelle, (White Emanuelle) (1976) Note: Italian Version of Emmanuelle with one "M". Stars Laura Gemser
- Black Emanuelle 2 (1976)
- Les Branchés à Saint-Tropez (The Fashioned in Saint- Tropez) (1983)
- Coups de Matraque avec Cynthia (Clubbing with Cynthia)
- Deux femmes en or (Two Women in Gold) (1970)
- Emmanuelle I (1974), Emmanuelle II (1975), Emanuelle III/Goodbye Emmanuelle (1977), Emmanuelle IV (1984)
- Emmanuelle & The White Slave Trade (1978) Note: the sex scene at an African automobile repair shop under a vehicle hoist was highly discussed.
- L'Enchainee (The Chained) (Italy 1985)
- Equateur (Equator) (broadcast 9 June 1990)
- Fanny Hill (1983) (broadcast 21 July 1990)
- Die heissen Nächte der Josefine Mutzenbacher (The Hot Nights of Josefine Mutzenbacher) (1981)
- Hôtel Exotica (1998)
- Je t'aime moi non plus (I Love You, Me Neither) (broadcast 28 July 1990)
- La Bonne (The Maid) (1986)
- La Chiave (The Key) (1983) (Tinto Brass film with Italian actress Stefania Sandrelli)
- Loulou (1980)
- La Vie secrète de Roméo et Juliette (The Secret Life of Romeo and Juliet) (1969)
- Le Dernier Tango à Paris (Last Tango in Paris) (1972)
- Le Gigolo (The Male Prostitute) (1960, France)
- Le journal de désirs (The Journal of Desires) (2000)
- L'été en pente douce (Summer on a Gentle Slope) (1987, France)
- Malizia (Malice) (1973) (by Salvatore Samperi, with Laura Antonelli)
- Malena (2000) – Italian actress Monica Bellucci seduces a young man. The film is set in Sicily in 1940 during World War II just as Italy enters the war. Malena's husband, who left to join the military is presumed dead and she is seduced by a young man.
- La Seconda Moglie (The Second Wife) (1998) – Italian actress Maria Grazia Cucinotta stars in this film based in early 1960s, a Sicilian single mother marries an older, crass widowed truck driver with a handsome stepson. When the driver is arrested trying to smuggle an antique, she ends up falling in love with her stepson.
- Nana : Le Désir (Nana, the True Key of Pleasure) (1983)
- 9½ Weeks (1986)
- On se calme et on boit frais à Saint-Tropez (Let's Calm Down and Drink Fresh in Saint-Tropez) (1987)
- Paprika (1991)
- Rasputin – Orgien am Zarenhof (Rasputin – Orgies at the Tsar’s Court") (1983)
- Rendez-vous (Appointment) (1985)
- Rosa la rose, fille publique (Rosa the Rose, public Girl) (France, 1985)
- Samanka Ile des Passions (Samanka Island of Passions) (1982)
- Tarzan, the Ape Man (1981)
- Tendres Cousines (Tender Cousins) (1980) - An erotic film that was highly discussed in Canadian society broadcast in 1987 with the famous "Touche Les" ("Touch them") scene. In the summer of 1939 in Provence, France: the 14-year-old Julien has a crush on his cousin Julia, who lives together with his family in their small hotel. Julien has a famous barn house scene with a much older woman who asks him to touch her breasts.
- Wild Orchid (1989)
- A Woman in Flames (1983)
- Y Tu Mamá También (And Your Mom Too) (2001) – Abandoned by their girlfriends for the summer, rich teenagers Tenoch and Julio meet older woman Luisa at a wedding. Trying to impress Luisa, the friends tell her they are headed on a road trip to a beautiful, secret beach.

== Television series shown on Bleu Nuit ==
- Softly from Paris (Série rose)
- Super Sexy

== See also ==
- The Baby Blue Movie, a softcore programming block that aired on Citytv in Ontario
- Cinérotique, a softcore programming block that aired on CFVO-TV in Quebec
