= Claire Maurier =

French actress (1929–2026)

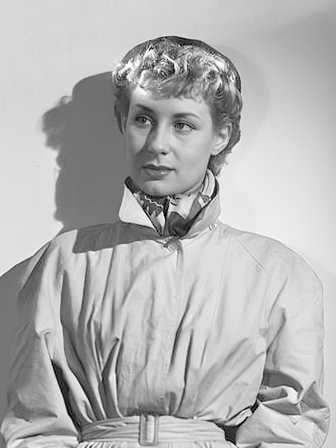
- Maurier in 1952
- Born: Odette-Michelle-Suzanne Agramon; 27 March 1929; Céret, France
- Died: 3 May 2026 (aged 97)
- Occupation: Actress
- Years active: 1947–2013

Odette-Michelle-Suzanne Agramon (27 March 1929 – 3 May 2026), known professionally as Claire Maurier, was a French actress who appeared in more than 90 films between 1947 and 2013.

== Life and career ==
Maurier was born Odette-Michelle-Suzanne Agramon on 27 March 1929 in the commune of Céret, in the Pyrénées-Orientales region, which is in the southwest of France.

Maurier started her acting career in small film roles at the end of the 1940s. Her first main role came when she portrayed Gilberte Doinel, the mother of the main character in François Truffaut's 1959 film The 400 Blows. Another notable early role of hers was as Christiane Colombey, the bigamist wife of the main character in the 1963 film La Cuisine au beurre.

In 1978, Maurier had a notable role in Édouard Molinaro's film La Cage aux Folles as Simone. In 1981, she was nominated the César Award for Best Actress in a Supporting Role for A Bad Son. She played Madeleine, a seductive older woman.

In 2001, Maurier gained international recognition when she starred as Mme. Suzanne, the owner of the Café des 2 Moulins, the Montmartre bistro where the titular character Amélie Poulain works as a waitress in Jean-Pierre Jeunet's Amélie (Le Fabuleux Destin d'Amélie Poulain). The film became the highest-grossing French-language film released in the United States. The film won four César Awards, and was nominated for five Academy Awards. In 2005, she starred as Maryse Berthelot in the French comedy series Faites comme chez vous!

In 2010, Maurier played the neglectful mother of Gérard Dépardieu's character Germain in Jean Becker's film My Afternoons with Margueritte.

Maurier died on 3 May 2026, at the age of 97.

== Filmography ==
Year	Title	Role	Director	Notes
1947	Un sourire dans la nature	The woman	Émile Couzinet	Short
1951	That Rascal Anatole	Germaine de la Boëtie	Émile Couzinet (2)	
1952	Rayés des vivants	A girl	Maurice Cloche	
1953	The Beauty of Cadiz	Alexandrine Dupont	Raymond Bernard & Eusebio Fernández Ardavín	
1953	A Caprice of Darling Caroline	Jeannette	Jean-Devaivre	
1953	Les vacances finissent demain	Anne-Marie	Yvan Noé	
1956	The Adventures of Gil Blas	Paquita	Ricardo Muñoz Suay & René Jolivet	
1956	Ce soir les jupons volent	The model	Dimitri Kirsanoff	
1956	L'amour est quelque part	Lili	Gaston Schoukens	
1956	Énigmes de l'histoire		Stellio Lorenzi	TV Series (1 Episode)
1956	Trente-Six Chandelles	Nana	Marcel Cravenne	TV Series (1 Episode)
1957	La Parisienne	Caroline Herblay	Michel Boisrond	
1958	Back to the Wall	Ghislaine	Édouard Molinaro	
1958	Les Cinq Dernières Minutes	Geneviève Bourgoin	Claude Loursais	TV Series (1 Episode)
1959	The 400 Blows	Gilberte Doinel	François Truffaut	
1959	En votre âme et conscience		Jean Prat	TV Series (1 Episode)
1960	A Mistress for the Summer	Viviane	Édouard Molinaro (2)	
1960	Une gueule comme la mienne	Claire Médina-Etiévant	Frédéric Dard	
1960	Les canailles	June Chalmers	Maurice Labro	
1961	Daniella by Night	Esmerelda	Max Pécas	
1961	Les livreurs	Bedelia	Jean Girault	
1961	Fuga desesperada	Marina Larsen	Robert Vernay & José Antonio de la Loma	
1961	On vous écrira		François Chatel	TV Movie
1961	La caméra explore le temps	Albine de Montholon	Guy Lessertisseur	TV Series (1 Episode)
1962	Douce violence	Claire	Max Pécas (2)	
1962	Les Cinq Dernières Minutes	Hélène	Claude Loursais (2)	TV Series (1 Episode)
1962	L'inspecteur Leclerc enquête	Madame Garnier / Meyer	Marcel Bluwal & Jean Laviron	TV Series (2 Episodes)
1963	La Cuisine au Beurre	Christiane Colombey	Gilles Grangier	
1964	Requiem pour un caïd	Jeannette Sorel	Maurice Cloche (2)	
1964	325 000 Francs	Cordélia	Jean Prat (2)	TV Movie
1964	Vol 272	Laura	Jean-Jacques Vierne & Michio Koga	TV Mini-Series
1965	Marvelous Angelique	Ninon de l'Enclos	Bernard Borderie	
1965	When the Pheasants Pass	Micheline Camus	Édouard Molinaro (3)	
1965	Don Quixote	The Duchess	Carlo Rim, Jacques Bourdon & Louis Grospierre	TV Mini-Series
1965	Bob Morane	Elsa	Robert Vernay (2)	TV Series (1 Episode)
1966	Sacrés fantômes		Stellio Lorenzi (2)	TV Movie
1966	Les fables de La Fontaine	Eva	Hervé Bromberger	TV Series (1 Episode)
1966	Vive la vie	Esther	Joseph Drimal	TV Series (1 Episode)
1968	Bouclage	Cécile	Alain Boudet	TV Movie
1968	Le théâtre de la jeunesse	Sister Marguerite	Eric Le Hung & Jacques Trébouta	TV Series (1 Episode)
1969	A Very Curious Girl	Irène	Nelly Kaplan	
1969	Laure	Sabine	Moshé Mizrahi	TV Series (1 Episode)
1969	Allô police	Françoise Vernon	Adonis Kyrou	TV Series (1 Episode)
1970	Le service des affaires classées	Catherine	Yannick Andréi	TV Series (1 Episode)
1971	Quentin Durward	Marion	Gilles Grangier (2)	TV Series (1 Episode)
1973	The Hostage Gang	Nelly Cerutti	Édouard Molinaro (4)	
1973	L'espion dormant	Doris	Agnès Delarive	TV Movie
1973	Témoignages	Madame Léonore	Jean-Marie Périer	TV Series (1 Episode)
1973	Le provocateur	Suzanne Ternant	Bernard Toublanc-Michel	TV Series (1 Episode)
1973	Les Mohicans de Paris	Léonore	Gilles Grangier (3)	TV Series (1 Episode)
1974	Impossible Is Not French	Mauricette Brisset	Robert Lamoureux	
1974	La conciliation ou anatomie d'un otage	Cécile	Alain Boudet (2)	TV Movie
1974	Jean Pinot, médecin d'aujourd'hui	Sophie Rambaud	Michel Fermaud	TV Series (1 Episode)
1975	Erreurs judiciaires	Maïté Legrand	Jean Laviron (2)	TV Series (1 Episode)
1976	Trois de coeur	Baroness Crowns	Roger Andrieux	TV Series (1 Episode)
1977	Banlieue Sud-Est		Gilles Grangier (4)	TV Mini-Series
1978	La Cage aux Folles	Simone Deblon	Édouard Molinaro (5)	
1978	The Little Wheedlers	Sophie's mother	Jean-Marie Poiré	
1978	Cinéma 16	Armance Dupon	Jean Larriaga	TV Series (1 Episode)
1979	La ville des silences	Muriel	Jean Marboeuf	
1979	Les trois mousquetaires	Anne of Austria	Pierre Neel	TV Movie
1979	Les amours de la belle époque	Mathilde	Agnès Delarive (2)	TV Series (1 Episode)
1979	Cinéma 16	Valérie Krebbs	Jean Marboeuf (2)	TV Series (1 Episode)
1980	A Bad Son	Madeleine	Claude Sautet	Nominated - César Award for Best Supporting Actress
1980	Il n'y a plus de héros au numéro que vous demandez	The antiquarian	Pierre Chabartier	TV Movie
1981	Ange, gardien	Madame de Castro	Joseph Drimal (2)	TV Movie
1981	Pause-café	The director	Serge Leroy	TV Series (1 Episode)
1983	Itinéraire bis	Marthe	Christian Drillaud	
1983	Vous habitez chez vos parents?	Alice Martell	Michel Fermaud (2)	
1983	Dessin sur un trottoir	Josepha	Maurice Cloche (3)	TV Movie
1983	Merci Sylvestre	The psy	Serge Korber	TV Series (1 Episode)
1985	Blanche et Marie	The neighbor	Jacques Renard	
1985	Les Cinq Dernières Minutes	Jeanne Vermont	Jean-Jacques Goron	TV Series (1 Episode)
1985	Le vent du large	Constance	Marlène Bertin	TV Series (1 Episode)
1987	La liberté Stéphanie	Madame Darsonville	Marlène Bertin (2)	TV Series (1 Episode)
1988	Loft story	Suzy	Stéphane Bertin & Boramy Tioulong	TV Series (2 Episodes)
1989	Cinéma 16	Clotilde	Jean Larriaga(2)	TV Series (1 Episode)
1994	Chêques en boîte	Odette	Nicolas Gessner	TV Movie
1996	Family Resemblances	Madame Ménard	Cédric Klapisch	
1996	Les chiens ne font pas des chats	Mamouchka	Ariel Zeitoun	TV Movie
1998	Riches, belles, etc.	The tawny woman	Bunny Godillot	
1998	Jean-Michel	The mother	Alexandre Zanetti	Short
1999	L'homme de ma vie	Nelly	Stéphane Kurc	
2001	Amélie	Madame Suzanne	Jean-Pierre Jeunet	
2001	Un homme à défendre	Denise Cassenti	Laurent Dussaux	TV Movie
2003	The Car Keys	The old lady	Laurent Baffie	
2003	La petite prairie aux bouleaux	Ginette	Marceline Loridan-Ivens	
2004	Nuit noire	The mother	Daniel Colas	
2004	Illustre inconnue	Jocelyne	Marc Fitoussi	Short
2005	Granny Boom	Grandma	Christiane Lehérissey	TV Movie
2005	Faites comme chez vous	Maryse Berthelot	Several	TV Series (19 Episodes)
2006	Les ambitieux	Madame Zahn	Catherine Corsini	
2006	Le héros de la famille	Colette	Thierry Klifa	
2007	La Vie d'artiste	Jocelyne	Marc Fitoussi (2)	
2007	Supergranny.com	Françoise	Christiane Lehérissey (2)	TV Movie
2009	Section de recherches	Tatiana de Clausade	Olivier Barma	TV Series (1 Episode)
2010	My Afternoons with Margueritte	Jacqueline	Jean Becker	
2010	Coursier	The expert	Hervé Renoh	
2012	La guerre du Royal Palace	Hortense Verdier	Claude-Michel Rome	TV Movie
2013	La Famille Katz	Milly	Arnauld Mercadier	TV Series (6 Episodes)

== Theatre ==
Year	Title	Author	Director	Notes
1952	Sans cérémonie	Jacques Vilfrid & Jean Girault	Pierre Mondy	
1954	Lysistrata	Aristophanes & Maurice Donnay	Raymond Hermantier	
1955	Elle est folle, Carole	Jean de Létraz	Simone de Létraz	
1956	Virginie	Michel André	Christian-Gérard	
1957	Le monsieur qui a perdu ses clefs	Michel Perrin	Raymond Gérôme	
1959	De sept heures à sept heures	Guillaume Hanoteau, Philippe Georges & R. C. Sherriff	Max Mégy	
1960	Le Comportement des époux Bredburry	François Billetdoux	François Billetdoux	
1962	Château en Suède	Françoise Sagan	André Barsacq	
1968	La brune que voilà	Robert Lamoureux	Robert Lamoureux	
1969	Cash-Cash	Anthony Marriott & Alistair Foot	Michel Vocoret	
1970	Une poignée d'orties	Marc-Gilbert Sauvajon	Jacques-Henri Duval	
1971	Sweet Bird of Youth	Tennessee Williams	André Barsacq (2)	
1972	Duos sur canapé	Marc Camoletti	Marc Camoletti	
1976	Le coeur sous le paillasson	Kay Bannerman & Harold Brooke	Jean-Luc Moreau	
1978	Les Filles	Jean Marsan	Jean Marsan	
1979	C'est à c't'heure ci que tu rentres ?	Michel Fermaud	Jean-Luc Moreau (2)	
1981	L'amant de Bornéo	Roger Ferdinand & José Germain	José Germain	
1981–84	La vie est trop courte	André Roussin	Michel Fagadau	
1985–86	La Berlue	Jean-Jacques Bricaire & Maurice Lasaygues	René Clermont	
1990–92	Steel Magnolias	Robert Harling	Stéphane Hillel	
1992	Marie Tudor	Victor Hugo	Jean-Renaud Garcia	
1993	Cat on a Hot Tin Roof	Tennessee Williams	Michel Fagadau (2)	
1994	Family Resemblances	Jean-Pierre Bacri & Agnès Jaoui	Stephan Meldegg	Nominated - Molière Award for Best Supporting Actress
2004	Crise de mères	Martial Courcier	Éric Le Roch	
2006–08	Toc toc	Laurent Baffie	Laurent Baffie	
