= François Dyrek =

French actor

- Born: 16 August 1933; Pontoise, France
- Died: 17 December 1999 (aged 66); Compiègne, France
- Occupation: Actor
- Years active: 1964–1999

François Dyrek (16 August 1933 – 17 December 1999) was a French actor. He appeared in more than 140 films and television shows between 1964 and 1999.

== Partial filmography ==
- L'assassin viendra ce soir (1964) – Un membre du gang des pompes funèbres
- La baie du désir (1964) – Le braconnier
- Drôle de jeu (1968) – Le second clandestin (Serge)
- La Bande à Bonnot (1968) – Édouard Carouy
- Ho! (1968) – Le typographe (uncredited)
- L'amour c'est gai, l'amour c'est triste (1971)
- Les galets d'Étretat (1972)
- Themroc (1973) – Un policier
- Night Flight from Moscow (1973) – - Taxi driver (uncredited)
- L'emmerdeur (1973)
- Projection privée (1973) – L'autre metteur en scène
- Piaf (1974) – Henri
- Let Joy Reign Supreme (1975) – Montlouis
- The Judge and the Assassin (1976) – Released Tramp
- I Am Pierre Riviere (1976) – L'homme de la battue
- Les Ambassadeurs (1976) – Paul
- Le Juge Fayard dit Le Shériff (1977) – José Bouvine – un truand
- La Question (1977) – Lieutenant Herbelin
- Monsieur Papa (1977)
- Vous n'aurez pas l'Alsace et la Lorraine (1977) – Le second tavernier
- Le Crabe-tambour (1977) – Le cafetier-gendarme
- L'exercice du pouvoir (1978)
- Si vous n'aimez pas ça, n'en dégoûtez pas les autres (1978) – Un spectateur
- Vas-y maman (1978) – Le routier
- Un balcon en forêt (1978)
- M58, la magnitude du bout du monde (1978)
- Coup de tête (1979) – Le chauffeur du premier camion
- Tendrement vache (1979) – Andre Legent
- Le divorcement (1979) – Julien
- Le mors aux dents (1979) – Guy Pasquier
- Écoute voir (1979) – Inspecteur Daloup
- Tout dépend des filles... (1980) – Good Night, l'aveugle
- The Little Mermaid (1980) – Un ami de Georges
- Asphalte (1981) – Edward
- Le chêne d'Allouville (1981) – Roger Dubois, l'adjoint au maire
- Julien Fontanes, magistrat (1981, TV Series) – Marcellin
- La vie continue (1981) – Robert
- Le jardinier (1981) – The Thief of Water
- Parti sans laisser d'adresse (1982) – L'inspecteur
- Le corbillard de Jules (1982) – Le capitaine
- Paradis pour tous (1982) – Le responsable du zoo
- Équateur (1983) – Superintendent
- Le voleur de feuilles (1983) – Jacky
- Les Rois du gag (1985) – L'épicier
- Le gaffeur (1985) – Marcel Dugrand
- Flagrant désir (1986) – Georges Barnac
- Noyade interdite (1987) – Bernard
- Tant pis si je meurs (1987) – Garfunkel
- Radio Corbeau (1989) – Albert Cauvin – le cafetier
- Torquemada (1989)
- Life and Nothing But (1989) – Vergnes
- La fracture du myocarde (1990) – Titanic
- A Day to Remember (1991) – Jean
- La tribu (1991) – Le chauffeur du camion
- Le coup suprême (1991) – L'homme-ours
- Le Zèbre (1992) – Alphonse
- La braconne (1993) – René
- Inner City (1995) – DD, le père
- Tempête dans un verre d'eau (1997) – Socrate
- Le margouillat (2000) – Le beau-père
