= Andrée Damant =

French actress (1929–2022)

- Born: 20 September 1929; Avignon, France
- Died: 6 December 2022 (aged 93); Paris, France
- Occupation: Actress
- Years active: 1960–2022

Andrée Damant (20 September 1929 – 6 December 2022) was a French actress.

== Early life ==
Andrée Damant was born on 20 September 1929 in Avignon.

== Career ==
Damant starred in many commercials. She also specialized in the roles of sympathetic Méridionales often Marseillaises pure strain, which led from time to time to interpret on screen characters from the world of Marcel Pagnol.

== Death ==
Damant died on 6 December 2022, at the age of 93.

== Filmography ==
Year	Title	Role	Director	Notes
1969	L'envolée belle	Madame Cabassol	Jean Prat	TV movie
1971	It Only Happens to Others		Nadine Trintignant	
1973	Les tentations de Marianne	Marianne's mother	Francis Leroi	
1973	Le Maître de pension	Fernande Cormat	Marcel Moussy	TV movie
1973	Les Cinq Dernières Minutes	Madame Malviez	Claude-Jean Bonnardot	TV series (1 episode)
1973	La ligne de démarcation	Thérèse	Jacques Ertaud	TV series (1 episode)
1974	La femme de Jean		Yannick Bellon	
1974	Chéri-Bibi	Madame Regime	Jean Pignol	TV series (1 episode)
1975	Cigalon	Sidonie	Georges Folgoas	TV movie
1976	Docteur Françoise Gailland		Jean-Louis Bertucelli	
1977	Blue jeans	The lady in the train	Hugues Burin des Roziers	
1977	La maison des autres		Jean-Pierre Marchand	TV series (1 episode)
1978	L'amour violé	Jean-Louis's mother	Yannick Bellon (2)	
1978	Le temps d'une République	A client	Roger Pigaut	TV series (1 episode)
1979	Le vérificateur	The nurse	Pierre Goutas	TV series (1 episode)
1980	Les incorrigibles	Maria	Abder Isker	TV mini-series
1981	Les deux orphelines	Sister Geneviève	Gérard Thomas	TV movie
1981	Des chandails pour l'hiver		Marc Marino	TV movie
1981	Le Rembrandt de Verrières		Pierre Goutas (2)	TV movie
1981	Les amours des années grises	The concierge	Gérard Thomas (2)	TV series (1 episode)
1981	L'inspecteur mène l'enquête		Pierre Cavassilas & Marc Pavaux	TV series (1 episode)
1982	Qu'est-ce qui fait courir David ?		Élie Chouraqui	
1982	Marion		Jean Pignol (2)	TV series (1 episode)
1983	Les Branchés à Saint-Tropez	Madame Bardaut	Max Pécas	
1983	Un homme à ma taille	André's mother	Annette Carducci	
1986	Yiddish Connection		Paul Boujenah	
1987	On se calme et on boit frais à Saint-Tropez	Madame Bardaut	Max Pécas (2)	
1987	Club de rencontres	The lady	Michel Lang	
1987	Tant qu'il y aura des femmes	Madame Beja	Didier Kaminka	
1987	Les enquêtes du commissaire Maigret	Madame Canut	Georges Ferraro	TV series (1 episode)
1989	Une saison de feuilles	Jacqueline	Serge Leroy	TV movie
1989	Pause-café	The neighbor	Serge Leroy (2)	TV series (1 episode)
1989	Les enquêtes du commissaire Maigret	Madame Pardon	James Thor	TV series (1 episode)
1990	My Father's Glory	A woman	Yves Robert	
1990	Les enfants de Lascaux	Julienne	Maurice Bunio	TV movie
1991	Pin-up et Pénélope	The woman	Valérie Malek	Short
1991	Héloïse	Mélanie	Pierre Tchernia	TV movie
1991	Cas de divorce	Louise Couture	Gérard Espinasse	TV series (1 episode)
1992	L'homme de ma vie	Malcolm's mother	Jean-Charles Tacchella	
1992	Le moulin de Daudet	Annou	Samy Pavel	
1992	Mes fiançailles avec Hilda	The mother	Eric Bitoun	Short
1993	Métisse	Maurice's mother	Mathieu Kassovitz	
1993	Regarde-moi quand je te quitte	A lady	Philippe de Broca	TV movie
1993	Anges ou démons ?		Pierre Aknine	TV movie
1993	Les grandes marées	Émilie	Jean Sagols	TV mini-series
1993	Maigret	The concierge	Étienne Périer	TV series (1 episode)
1994	Dead Tired	Madame Volpi	Michel Blanc	
1994	Raoul et Lili	Lili	William Leroux	Short
1994	Les yeux d'Hélène	Assunta	Jean Sagols (2)	TV series (1 episode)
1994	La grande collection	Pépette	Gérard Vergez	TV series (1 episode)
1995	La Haine	The concierge	Mathieu Kassovitz (2)	
1995	Inner City	The mother	Jean-François Richet	
1995	À cran	Marie-Rose	Solange Martin	
1995	En mai, fais ce qu'il te plaît	Marie	Pierre Grange	
1995	Sept ans et demi de réflexion	The concierge	Sylvie Flepp	Short
1995	Les Cinq Dernières Minutes	Yvonne Azemard	Jean-Louis Lorenzi	TV series (1 episode)
1995	L'instit	Mamie	Christian Karcher	TV series (1 episode)
1996	When the Cat's Away	Madame Dubois	Cédric Klapisch	
1996	La Belle Verte		Coline Serreau	
1996	La rançon du chien	The mother	Peter Kassovitz	TV movie
1996	La dernière fête		Pierre Granier-Deferre	TV movie
1996	Sixième classique	Madame Caruso	Bernard Stora	TV movie
1996	Dans un grand vent de fleurs	Lazarie Beauval	Gérard Vergez (2)	TV mini-series
1997	Tout doit disparaître	Annie	Philippe Muyl	
1997	La femme du cosmonaute		Jacques Monnet	
1997	Salut l'angoisse	Mireille	Maurice Frydland	TV movie
1998	Man Is a Woman	Bank employee	Jean-Jacques Zilbermann	
1998	This Could Be the Last Time	Grandmother	Gavin Millar	TV movie
1998	Famille de Coeur	Madame Lefort	Gérard Vergez (3)	TV movie
1998	Laisse un peu d'amour	Monique	Zaïda Ghorab-Volta	TV movie
1999	Les parasites	Lucette	Philippe de Chauveron	
1999	La nuit des hulottes	Adèle	Michaëla Watteaux	TV movie
1999	La femme du boulanger	Celeste	Nicolas Ribowski	TV movie
1999	Tramontane	Marie Calce	Henri Helman	TV mini-series
2000	Les insaisissables	Madeleine	Christian Gion	
2000	Le harem de Mme Osmane	Mrs. Costa	Nadir Moknèche	
2000	Victoire, ou la douleur des femmes	The farmer	Nadine Trintignant (2)	TV mini-series
2001	Amélie	Mrs. Collignon	Jean-Pierre Jeunet	
2001	Dernière séance	The mother	Vincent Garenq	Short
2001	L'île bleue		Nadine Trintignant (3)	TV movie
2001	Le lycée	François's mother	Miguel Courtois	TV series (1 episode)
2002	Whatever You Say	Micheline	Guillaume Canet	
2002	Nulle part où aller		Franck Thoraval	Short
2002	Fabio Montale	Norine	José Pinheiro	TV mini-series
2003	Ripoux 3	Carmen's client	Claude Zidi	
2003	Toutes les filles sont folles	The happy old lady	Pascale Pouzadoux	
2003	Paris selon Moussa	Nathalie's mother	Cheik Doukouré	
2003	Clémence	Lucienne Salmon	Pascal Chaumeil	TV movie
2004	House of D	French Woman in Window	David Duchovny	
2004	Si c'est ça la famille	Pierrot's grandma	Peter Kassovitz (2)	
2004	Tout le plaisir est pour moi	Guillemette	Isabelle Broué	
2004	Fabien Cosma	Emma	Marion Sarraut	TV series (1 episode)
2005	Le meilleur commerce du monde	Simone	Bruno Gantillon	TV movie
2005	Sauveur Giordano	Madame Reynard	Pierre Joassin	TV series (1 episode)
2005	Le juge est une femme	Antoine's mother	Jean-Marc Seban	TV series (1 episode)
2006	Tell No One	Simone	Guillaume Canet (2)	
2006	My Best Friend	Lady on the train	Patrice Leconte	
2006	Le Grand Meaulnes		Jean-Daniel Verhaeghe	
2006	Tout bascule		Denis Le Guillochet & Serge Sarve	TV movie
2006	Le tuteur	Madame Despal	Édouard Molinaro	TV series (1 episode)
2007	72/50		Armel de Lorme & Gauthier Fages de Bouteiller	
2007	La deuxième vie du sucrier	The old woman	Didier Canaux	Short
2007	Le temps des secrets	Eugénie Pagnol	Thierry Chabert	TV movie
2007	Le temps des amours	Eugénie Pagnol	Thierry Chabert (2)	TV movie
2007	R.I.S, police scientifique	Madame Minnier	Christophe Douchand	TV series (1 episode)
2008	Tokyo!		Leos Carax	
2008	L'emmerdeur	The old woman	Francis Veber	
2008	Comme les autres	Suzanne	Vincent Garenq (2)	
2008	Paris Nord Sud	Manon	Franck Llopis	
2008	Les insoumis	The old woman	Claude-Michel Rome	
2009	La sainte Victoire	Jacqueline	François Favrat	
2009	The Day Will Come	Claire	Susanne Schneider	
2010	A vos caisses !	A client	Pierre Isoard	TV movie
2010	Fais pas ci, fais pas ça	Francine	Alexandre Pidoux	TV series (1 episode)
2010	Plus belle la vie	Julienne Vidal	Several	TV series (18 episodes)
2011	Le jour où tout a basculé	Marthe	Emmanuel Carriau	TV series (1 episode)
2012	Julie Lescaut	Madame Robert	Christian Bonnet	TV series (1 episode)
2013	Belle and Sebastian	Célestine	Nicolas Vanier	
2013	Section de recherches	Fernande Faure	Éric Le Roux	TV series (1 episode)
2013	Détectives	Madame Briand	Lorenzo Gabriele	TV series (1 episode)
2014	Marthe	Marthe	Anne-Claire Jaulin	Short
2014	Disparus	Angèle	Thierry Binisti	TV mini-series
2015	Les Tulipes Fleurissent aussi	Colette	Alysse Hallali & Thibaud Martin	Short
2016	Venise sous la neige	Tatie	Elliott Covrigaru	

== Theater ==
Year	Title	Author	Director	Notes
1960	Les Coréens	Michel Vinaver	Gabriel Monnet	
1961	La Vie de Timon d'Athènes	William Shakespeare	Gabriel Monnet (2)	Théâtre Sarah-Bernhardt & Théâtre Montansier
1968	Man Equals Man	Bertolt Brecht	Jean-Pierre Dougnac	Théâtre du Midi
1983	Cyrano de Bergerac	Edmond Rostand	Jérôme Savary	Théâtre Mogador
1987	The Picture of Family Happiness	Alexander Ostrovsky	Jacques Mauclair	Théâtre du Marais
2003	Tout bascule !	Olivier Lejeune	Olivier Lejeune	Théâtre de la Michodière
2005	The Debt Paid Late	Stefan Zweig	Didier Long	Théâtre 14
2010	La Monnaie de la pièce	Didier Caron & Roland Marchisio	Didier Caron	Théâtre Michel
2010	Au nom du fils	Alain Cauchi	Étienne Bierry	Théâtre de Poche Montparnasse
2014	Jeux de massacre	Eugène Ionesco	Hervé Van der Meulen	Théatre d'Asnières
2014-15	Jofroi	Jean Giono	Jean-Claude Baudracco	Tour
