= The Baby Blue Movie =

Canadian softcore porn TV programming

- Original series title card
- Also known as: Baby Blue Returns; Baby Blue 2
- Genre: Softcore pornography Erotica
- Created by: Moses Znaimer
- Narrated by: Mark Dailey
- Country of origin: Canada

Production
- Producers: Robert Lantos; Brian Linehan
- Production company: CHUM Limited (1981–2007)

Original release
- Network: Citytv
- Release: September 29, 1972 – August 30, 2008

The Baby Blue Movie is a late-night programming block on the Canadian television channel Citytv that primarily aired softcore pornography and erotica films. Initially broadcast from 1972 to 1975 to generate publicity for the then-upstart channel, Baby Blue was the first regularly scheduled adult television program to air in North America. The series was revived in the 1990s as Baby Blue 2, which aired until 2008.

== History ==
CITY-TV began broadcasting out of Toronto, Ontario on September 28, 1972, as the first commercial ultra high frequency (UHF) television station in Canada. Station founder Moses Znaimer aired feature films as the bulk of Citytv's programming as the station established itself, and hired Brian Linehan to purchase and schedule movies. To generate publicity for the new station and communicate that it was for "mature, urban adults," Znaimer conceived of a regularly scheduled block of softcore adult films to air on Friday nights, which became The Baby Blue Movie. The title was suggested by Znaimer's partner Marilyn Lightstone, who noted that because the films were not "blue" movies (a term for X rated films), they could be classified as "baby blue" instead.

I Am Curious (Yellow) aired as the first Baby Blue Movie on September 29, 1972, with the film's companion I Am Curious (Blue) airing the following night. Robert Lantos later joined as a producer after acquiring Canadian broadcasting rights to short films from the New York Erotic Film Festival and selling the rights to Znaimer, which aired as The Best of the New York Erotic Film Festival.

The Metropolitan Toronto Police exerted frequent pressure on Znaimer and Citytv over Baby Blue, and in January 1975 the station was charged with obscenity for the Baby Blue broadcast of Love Boccaccio Style. While the charge was eventually dismissed, Znaimer elected to cancel Baby Blue shortly thereafter, stating that the program had accomplished its goal of generating publicity for Citytv and that the network was running out of acceptable films to broadcast. On May 2, 1975, the all-ages film Cat Ballou aired in the time slot normally reserved for Baby Blue, with the viewer discretion notice comedically re-phrased to indicate that "the following program is for family audiences."

To mark the 20th anniversary of Citytv, The Best of the New York Erotic Film Festival was screened on September 28, 1992 as a one-off installment of Baby Blue titled Baby Blue Returns. The series was revived as Baby Blue 2 in the late 1990s as a companion to Ed's Night Party, with the viewer discretion warning delivered by Citytv journalist Mark Dailey. CHUM Limited was acquired by CTVglobemedia in 2007 and the Citytv stations were sold to Rogers Media later that year; Baby Blue ceased broadcasting shortly thereafter, with Sex House Volume 1 airing as the final Baby Blue Movie on August 30, 2008. (Note: Per the Internet Archive.)

== Programming ==
=== Films ===
- All The Loving Couples
- The Best of the New York Erotic Film Festival
- Bummer
- Camille 2000
- The Dark Side of Tomorrow
- Deviant Vixens
- Erotic Day Dream
- Fire in Flesh
- The Golden Box
- I Am Curious (Blue)
- A Fistful of 44s (1971)
- Love Boccaccio Style
- Love Me Twice
- Sex House Volume 1
- Naked Ambition
- Naked and Free
- Shame, Shame, Everybody Knows Her Name
- Pleasure Palace
- Therese and Isabelle
- Wanda The Sadistic Hypnotist
- Wild Honey

=== Television series ===
- Beverly Hills Bordello
- Number 96

== Impact and influence ==
Baby Blue was the first regularly scheduled adult television program to be broadcast in North America. A 1973 survey by the Bureau of Broadcast Measurement found that the series was viewed by 210,000 of the 450,000 households that Citytv was broadcast to; at its peak, Baby Blue was watched by two-thirds of the television-viewing public in Toronto. The popularity of the series allowed Citytv to set commercial advertising rates for Baby Blue at CAD$250 per minute, nearly double what the channel charged for other programs on its schedule.

In 1975, the theater company Theatre Passe Muraille staged the original play I Love You, Baby Blue, which used the series to examine Toronto's sex culture; the success of the play allowed the company to purchase its current space on Ryerson Avenue, which it occupies to this day. David Cronenberg's 1983 film Videodrome, which focuses on a fictional Toronto-based UHF television station that is infamous for broadcasting sensationalistic material, is inspired by Citytv and Baby Blue.

== See also ==
- Bleu Nuit (Midnight Blue), a softcore programming block that aired on Télévision Quatre-Saisons (TQS), now Noovo in Quebec
- Cinérotique, a softcore programming block that aired on CFVO-TV in Quebec
