= Les Cinq Dernières Minutes =

French crime television series

- Genre: Crime
- Created by: Claude Loursais
- Written by: Claude Loursais
- Starring: Raymond Souplex
- Country of origin: France
- Original language: French
- No. of seasons: 4
- No. of episodes: 149

Production
- Producer: Claude Loursais
- Running time: 90 minutes

Original release
- Network: RTF, Antenne 2
- Release: 1 January 1958 – 20 December 1996

Les Cinq Dernières Minutes (French: [le sɛ̃k dɛʁnjɛʁ miˈnyt]; English: The Last Five Minutes) is a French crime television series created and written by Claude Loursais, broadcast from 1 January 1958 till 20 December 1996. The show was aired in four series on several channels.

The first series was broadcast in 56 episodes between 1 January 1958 and 7 November 1973 on RTF. After an intermediary series of four 90-minute episodes were broadcast from 19 July 1974 to 16 January 1975, a second 72-episode series was broadcast from 1975 to 1993, then a third 17-episode series from 1993 to 1996 was broadcast on Antenne 2.

== Summary ==
Les Cinq Dernières Minutes was the first long-running series about police inquiries on French television. Each episode is based on an investigation where the viewer, accompanied by Commissioner Inspector Antoine Bourrel and his assistant Deputy Dupuy, must find clues which will help find the culprit. The programme often takes place in unconventional environments or situations, such as at a racecourse, scrap dealers, the Eiffel Tower or a commercial printing business.

At the beginning, the series was a game show, which was filmed in studio and broadcast live. Two selected viewers took part and had to guess who was guilty when inspector Bourrel said the famous line: "Good God! But it's... Of course!". Each of the two contestants had the opportunity to repeat two parts of the show, which would also be seen by the audience at home. This famously happened during the pilot episode when glasses of champagne were given out. In some of the original episodes, there was also participation from the viewers at home, but this was abandoned during the first series.

== Cast ==
Over time, many actors and personalities have featured on the show, including: Françoise Fabian, Guy Kerner, Ginette Leclerc, Rellys, Pierre Brasseur, Henri Virlogeux, Bernard Fresson, Henri Crémieux, Jacques Monod, Henri Vilbert, André Valmy, Robert Vattier, Serge Gainsbourg, Anémone, Jean Topart, Paul Le Person, Jess Hahn, Marie-Georges Pascal, Pierre Clémenti, Michel Robin and Paul Préboist.

The series also introduced many young actors to the audience, such as Yves Rénier. Marc Eyraud was the only actor to play in the first, intermediary and second series.

=== Series 1 (1958–1973) ===
- Raymond Souplex as Commissioner inspector Antoine Bourrel (1958–1973)
- Jean Daurand as Deputy Dupuy
- Pierre Collet as Officer of the Police Judiciaire

=== Intermediary series (1974–1975) ===
- Christian Barbier as Commissioner Le Carré (1974–1975)
- Jacques Bouvier as The Judge (1974)
- Marc Eyraud as Inspector Ménardeau (1974–1975)
- Henri Lambert as Inspector Lindet (1974)

=== Series 2 (1975–1993) ===
- Jacques Debary as Commissioner Cabrol (1975–1992)
- Marc Eyraud as Inspector Ménardeau (1975–1992)
- Caroline Silhol as Commissioner Belmont (1988–1992)
- Marc Adjadj as Inspector Lamouri (1988–1992)
- Valérie Jonckeere as Daughter Georges Claisse

=== Series 3 (1993–1996) ===
- Pierre Santini as Commissioner Massard (1993–1996)
- Pierre Hoden as Inspector Antoine Barrier (1993–1996)

=== Guests ===
- Andrée Damant
- Artus de Penguern
- Aurélien Recoing
- Catherine Jacob
- Christine Citti
- Claire Maurier
- Claire Nadeau
- Claude Gensac
- Daniel Prévost
- Danièle Évenou
- Danièle Lebrun
- Dominique Blanc
- Édith Scob
- Fabienne Chaudat
- Francine Bergé
- François Marthouret
- François Morel
- François Perrot
- Françoise Bertin
- Geneviève Mnich
- Ginette Garcin
- Jackie Sardou
- Laure Duthilleul
- Liliane Rovère
- Magali Clément
- Marthe Villalonga
- Myriam Boyer
- Pascale Roberts
- Philippe Nahon
- Pierre Arditi
- Tonie Marshall
- Valérie Vogt
- Véra Belmont
- Yves Rénier

== Trivia ==
This programme was extremely successful until main actor Raymond Souplex left in November 1972. In recognition of his character, the following commissioners were no longer called Bourrel, but instead, Le Carré, Cabrol and Massard.

Besides Claude Loursais, many directors wrote for this programme, notably Jean-Pierre Decourt, Bernard Hecht, Jean-Yves Jeudi, Guy Lessertisseur, Raymond Pontarlier and Guy Séligmann. The scripts for the first series were mostly written by Jean Cosmos, Fred Kassak and Louis C. Thomas.

The theme music played (on trumpet by Pierre Thibaud) during the opening sequence is called "Arsenic Blues" and was composed by Marc Lanjean.

The programme was referenced by Gotlib in many of his comic strips in the Rubrique-à-Brac series. Raymond Devos also references it in one of his sketches, "Ma dernière heure est arrivée".
