= Pascale Roberts =

French actress (1930–2019)

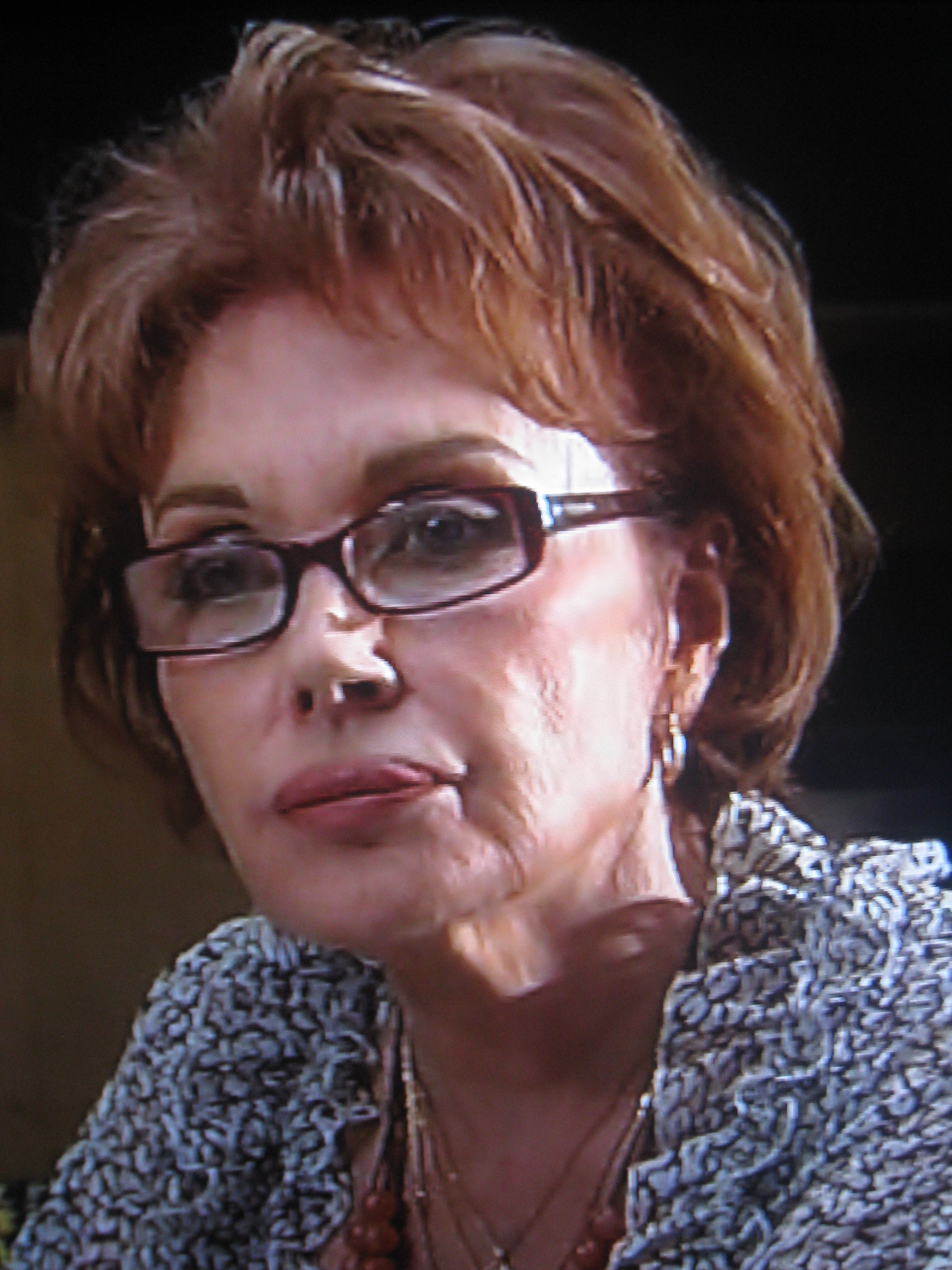
- Pascale Roberts in 2010
- Born: 21 October 1930; Boulogne-Billancourt, Hauts-de-Seine, France
- Died: 26 October 2019 (aged 89); Garches, France
- Occupation: Actress
- Years active: 1954–2016
- Notable credit: Plus belle la vie
- Spouse: Pierre Mondy

Pascale Roberts (21 October 1930 – 26 October 2019) was a French film and television actress. She was a César Award nominee.

== Theater ==
| Year | Title | Author | Director | Notes |
|---|---|---|---|---|
| 1959 | La Petite Molière | Jean Anouilh | Jean-Louis Barrault | Grand Théâtre de Bordeaux |
| 1960-61 | Piège pour un homme seul | Robert Thomas | Jacques Charon | Théâtre des Célestins |
| 1961 | Spéciale Dernière | Ben Hecht & Charles MacArthur | Pierre Mondy | Théâtre de la Renaissance |
| 1964 | 2 + 2 = 2 | Staff Knop | Georges Vitaly | Théâtre La Bruyère |
| 1967 | Des petits bonhommes dans du papier journal | Jean-Claude Darnal | Bernard Jenny | Théâtre du Vieux-Colombier |
| 1969 | La Poulette aux œufs d'or | Robert Thomas | Robert Thomas | Théâtre des Capucines |
| 1971 | How the Other Half Loves | Alan Ayckbourn | Jean-Laurent Cochet | Théâtre de la Madeleine |
| 1975 | Le Dindon | Georges Feydeau | Jean Meyer | Théâtre des Célestins |
| 1980 | ... Diable d'homme ! | Robert Lamoureux | Daniel Ceccaldi | Théâtre des Bouffes-Parisiens |
| 1983 | L'Entourloupe | Alain Reynaud-Fourton | Michel Modo | Théâtre des Nouveautés |
| 1990 | Tiercé gagnant | John Chapman | Christopher Renshaw | Théâtre de la Michodière |
| 1992 | Caligula | Albert Camus | Jacques Rosny | Théâtre des Mathurins |
| 1995 | Sacré Nostradamus ! | Jean Dell | Gérard Caillaud | Théâtre des Mathurins |
| 1997 | Merchants of Glory | Marcel Pagnol, Paul Nivoix & Robert Trébort | Michel Fagadau | Théâtre des Champs-Élysées |
| 2004 | Un beau salaud | Pierre Chesnot | Jean-Luc Moreau | Théâtre de Paris |
| 2005 | Ces dames de bonne compagnie | Bruno Druart | Pierre Santini | Théâtre de Paris |
| 2007 | King Lear | William Shakespeare | Marie Montegani | International Visual Theatre |

== Filmography ==
| Year | Title | Role | Director | Notes |
|---|---|---|---|---|
| 1954 | Une vie de garçon | | Jean Boyer | |
| 1954 | The Women Couldn't Care Less | Casa Antica's Seller | Bernard Borderie | |
| 1954 | Madame du Barry | Jeanne's friend | Christian-Jaque | |
| 1955 | Série noire | Gaby Ménard | Pierre Foucaud | |
| 1955 | Caroline and the Rebels | Sallanches's friend | Jean-Devaivre | |
| 1955 | Magic Village | | Jean-Paul Le Chanois | |
| 1955 | Captain Gallant of the Foreign Legion | Tina | Sam Newfield | TV series (1 episode) |
| 1955 | Men in White | Vicky | Ralph Habib | |
| 1955 | Cherchez la femme | Cathy Mermans | Raoul André | |
| 1955 | Lord Rogue | Anna Risomonti | André Haguet | |
| 1956 | Mémoires d'un flic | Betty | Pierre Foucaud (2) & André Hunebelle | |
| 1956 | L'homme et l'enfant | Rita | Raoul André (2) | |
| 1956 | Pasión en el mar | Alicia | Arturo Ruiz Castillo | |
| 1957 | Et par ici la sortie | Esméralda | Willy Rozier | |
| 1957 | Marchands de filles | Gaby | Maurice Cloche | |
| 1957 | Quand la femme s'en mêle | Gigi | Yves Allégret | |
| 1957 | Ces dames préfèrent le mambo | Constance Are | Bernard Borderie (2) | |
| 1958 | Quand sonnera midi | La Morenita | Edmond T. Gréville | |
| 1958 | Les Cinq Dernières Minutes | Juliette Clairoux | Claude Loursais | TV series (1 episode) |
| 1958 | Le Sicilien | Olga | Pierre Chevalier | |
| 1959 | Le fric | Gisèle Moulin | Maurice Cloche (2) | |
| 1960 | Les loups dans la bergerie | Irène | Hervé Bromberger | |
| 1960 | Préméditation | Sylvie Foucot | André Berthomieu | |
| 1961 | Dans la gueule du loup | Myriam | Jean-Charles Dudrumet | |
| 1961 | Les moutons de Panurge | Madame Renard | Jean Girault | |
| 1962 | Kickengrogne | | André Pergament | TV movie |
| 1962 | L'inspecteur Leclerc enquête | Chantal | Guy Lefranc | TV series (1 episode) |
| 1962 | Five Miles to Midnight | The Streetwalker | Anatole Litvak | |
| 1962 | We Will Go to Deauville | Monique Moreau | Francis Rigaud | |
| 1963 | The Danny Thomas Show | Jeanette Giroux | Sheldon Leonard | TV series (1 episode) |
| 1963 | La rabouilleuse | Flore | François Gir | TV movie |
| 1963 | Sweet and Sour | Spogliarella | Jacques Baratier | |
| 1963 | Le bon roi Dagobert | Mata-Clotilde | Pierre Chevalier (2) | |
| 1963 | Commissaire mène l'enquête | Madame Marnay | Fabien Collin | (segment "Geste d'un fanatique") |
| 1964 | Mystery of the Red Jungle | Margaret Perkins | Helmut Ashley & Giorgio Stegani | |
| 1964 | Le bluffeur | Eliane | Sergio Gobbi | |
| 1964 | Relax Darling | Cecile | Jean Boyer (2) | |
| 1965 | Bonjour tristesse | Elsa | François Chatel | TV movie |
| 1965 | Les baratineurs | Jacqueline Dujardin | Francis Rigaud (2) | |
| 1965 | Chambre à louer | Nathalie Dulac | Jean-Pierre Desagnat | TV series (24 episodes) |
| 1965 | Une nuit sans lendemain | Trill | Lazare Iglesis | TV movie |
| 1965 | The Sleeping Car Murders | Georgette Thomas | Costa-Gavras | |
| 1965-1966 | Les saintes chéries | Julie | Jean Becker & Maurice Delbez | TV series (5 episodes) |
| 1966 | L'écharpe | Nora | Abder Isker | TV movie |
| 1966 | L'amour en papier | Antinéa | François Chatel (2) | TV movie |
| 1967 | Le 13ème caprice | | Roger Boussinot | |
| 1967 | The Blonde from Peking | Monica Davis | Nicolas Gessner | |
| 1967 | Les créatures du bon Dieu | | Jean Laviron | TV series (1 episode) |
| 1967 | Spéciale dernière | Gina Malloy | Alain Dhénaut | TV movie |
| 1967 | Allô police | | Paul Siegrist | TV series (1 episode) |
| 1968 | Les dossiers de l'agence O | The stewardess | Marc Simenon | TV series (1 episode) |
| 1968 | A Strange Kind of Colonel | Marina | Jean Girault (2) | |
| 1968 | Les chevaliers du ciel | Nathalie | François Villiers | TV series (1 episode) |
| 1969 | Bruno, l'enfant du dimanche | Simone | Louis Grospierre | |
| 1969 | Les patates | Fifine | Claude Autant-Lara | |
| 1969 | Three | Claude | James Salter | |
| 1971 | Une autre vie | Jacqueline | Louis Grospierre (2) | TV series (1 episode) |
| 1971 | Friends | Annie | Lewis Gilbert | |
| 1971 | Diabolissimo | Madame Desprées | Pierre Bureau | TV movie |
| 1971 | Au théâtre ce soir | Olwen Peel | Pierre Sabbagh | TV series (1 episode) |
| 1972 | Pot-Bouille | | Yves-André Hubert | TV mini-series |
| 1972 | Les chemins de pierre | Denise Brassac | Joseph Drimal | TV series (1 episode) |
| 1973 | La brigade en folie | | Philippe Clair | |
| 1973 | Le temps de vivre, le temps d'aimer | Mathilde Moser | Louis Grospierre (3) | TV mini-series |
| 1974 | Le permis de conduire | Geneviève Martenot | Jean Girault (3) | |
| 1974 | Arsène Lupin | Irène Imbert | Jean-Pierre Desagnat (2) | TV series (1 episode) |
| 1975 | Raging Fists | Mrs. Sevin | Eric Le Hung | |
| 1975 | The Common Man | Madame Colin | Yves Boisset | |
| 1975 | Incorrigible | Adrienne | Philippe de Broca | |
| 1976 | Les mal partis | Madame Leterrand | Sébastien Japrisot | |
| 1977 | D'Artagnan amoureux | | Yannick Andréi | TV mini-series |
| 1978 | Les amours sous la révolution | Madame du Châtelet | Jean-Paul Carrère | TV movie |
| 1978 | Le beaujolais nouveau est arrivé | Georges's wife | Jean-Luc Voulfow | |
| 1979 | L'éblouissement | Jackie | Jean-Paul Carrère (2) | TV movie |
| 1979 | Histoires de voyous | Loulou | Gilles Grangier | TV movie |
| 1980 | Les amours des années folles | Alberte | Jean-Paul Roux | TV series (1 episode) |
| 1980 | Les chevaux du soleil | Marie Carnetto | François Villiers (2) | TV series (1 episode) |
| 1980 | Three Men to Kill | Madame Borel | Jacques Deray | |
| 1980 | Changements de décors | Marilou / Hermione | Jean-Jacques Sirkis | TV mini-series |
| 1980 | Cinéma 16 | La femme de l'accordeur de pianos | Edmond Séchan | TV series (1 episode) |
| 1981 | Exil | | Egon Günther | TV mini-series |
| 1981 | For a Cop's Hide | Renée Mouzon | Alain Delon | |
| 1981 | Les amours des années grises | Thérèse Coudert | Jean-Paul Roux (2) | TV series (1 episode) |
| 1981 | Die Rosen von Dublin | Cora | Lazare Iglesis (2) | TV mini-series |
| 1981 | L'oeil de la nuit | Madame Pimpernol | Jean-Pierre Richard | TV series (1 episode) |
| 1981 | Si ma gueule vous plaît... | Elisabeth | Michel Caputo | |
| 1983 | Prends ton passe-montagne, on va à la plage | Glamour | Eddy Matalon | |
| 1983 | Quelques hommes de bonne volonté | | François Villiers (3) | TV mini-series |
| 1983 | Surprise Party | Madame Gisèle | Roger Vadim | |
| 1984 | Aldo et Junior | The lady | Patrick Schulmann | |
| 1984 | L'appartement | Madame Villegier | Dominique Giuliani | TV series (1 episode) |
| 1985 | Brigade des mœurs | | Max Pécas | |
| 1986 | L'entourloupe | Irène Gensac | Edouard Logereau | TV movie |
| 1986 | Madame et ses flics | | Roland-Bernard | TV series (1 episode) |
| 1986 | Gros dégueulasse | Woman in the toilet | Bruno Zincone | |
| 1987 | Cinéma 16 | Raymonde | Guy Jorré | TV series (1 episode) |
| 1987 | The Grand Highway | Yvonne | Jean-Loup Hubert | |
| 1987 | Double face | Ida | Serge Leroy | TV movie |
| 1987 | Fucking Fernand | Marie-Thérèse | Gérard Mordillat | |
| 1988 | L'appart | Maria | Christiane Spiero | TV series (1 episode) |
| 1988 | Carte de presse | Françoise | Michel Favart | TV mini-series |
| 1988 | Big Man: 395 dollari l'oncia | Mado | Steno | TV movie |
| 1989 | Tendresse et passion | Madeleine Ricoeur | | TV series (1 episode) |
| 1990 | Renseignements généraux | The agency's owner | Claude Barma | TV series (1 episode) |
| 1990 | Le lien du sang | Eliane | Pierre Lary | TV movie |
| 1992 | Un beau petit milliard | Yvonne | Pierre Tchernia | TV movie |
| 1992 | Le secret du petit milliard | Yvonne | Pierre Tchernia (2) | TV movie |
| 1992 | Tiercé gagnant | Adrienne de la Haie | André Flédérick | TV movie |
| 1993 | Le mari de Léon | Hermance | Jean-Pierre Mocky | |
| 1993 | Le juge est une femme | Fabienne Parent | Serge Leroy (2) | TV series (1 episode) |
| 1993 | Un soleil pour l'hiver | Zina | Laurent Carcélès | TV movie |
| 1994 | L'instit | Dora | Michel Favart (2) | TV series (1 episode) |
| 1994 | La dernière carte | Odile Langlois | Sergio Gobbi (2) | |
| 1994 | Revenge of the Musketeers | Mother Superior | Bertrand Tavernier | |
| 1995 | À la vie, à la mort ! | Joséfa | Robert Guédiguian | |
| 1995 | Noël et après | Thérèse | Daniel Vigne | TV movie |
| 1996 | Double peine | The mother | Thomas Gilou | TV movie |
| 1996-1997 | Jamais deux sans toi...t | Margot | Dominique Masson, Christophe Andrei & Emmanuel Fonlladosa | TV series (5 episodes) |
| 1997 | La mère de nos enfants | | Jean-Louis Lorenzi | TV movie |
| 1997 | Regards d'enfance | Grandma | Emmanuel Finkiel | TV series (1 episode) |
| 1997 | Marius and Jeannette | Caroline | Robert Guédiguian (2) | Nominated - César Award for Best Supporting Actress |
| 1997 | Maigret | Mado | Michel Favart (3) | TV series (1 episode) |
| 1998 | Vertiges | Régine | Gérard Cuq | TV series (1 episode) |
| 1998 | The Pianist | Sra. Amparo | Mario Gas | |
| 1998 | Les pédiatres | Geneviève Jarry | Hartmut Griesmayr & Daniel Losset | TV mini-series |
| 1998 | Bob le magnifique | Lucette | Marc Angelo | TV movie |
| 1998-2001 | Marie Fransson | Luce | Jean-Pierre Prévost, Jean-Pierre Vergne & Christiane Spiero (2) | TV series (3 episodes) |
| 1999 | Les mômes | Suzanne | Patrick Volson | TV movie |
| 1999 | Chili con carne | Claude's mother | Thomas Gilou (2) | |
| 1999 | Les Cordier, juge et flic | Annie Gassot | Jean-Denis Robert | TV series (1 episode) |
| 2000 | À l'attaque ! | Henri's mother | Robert Guédiguian (4) | |
| 2000 | The Town Is Quiet | Paul's Mother | Robert Guédiguian (3) | |
| 2000 | L'enfant de la honte | Mady | Claudio Tonetti | TV movie |
| 2001 | Combats de femme | Catherine | Karin Albou | TV series (1 episode) |
| 2001 | Joséphine, ange gardien | Louise | Dominique Baron | TV series (1 episode) |
| 2002 | L'amour interdit | Lorraine | Jacques Malaterre | TV movie |
| 2003 | Pas si grave | Pilar | Bernard Rapp | |
| 2003 | Un bébé noir dans un couffin blanc | Nicole | Laurent Dussaux | TV movie |
| 2003 | Femmes de loi | Hélène Roque-Dumont | Emmanuel Gust | TV series (1 episode) |
| 2003 | I'm Staying! | Mamyvonne | Diane Kurys | |
| 2003 | L'adorable femme des neiges | Solange | Jean-Marc Vervoort | TV movie |
| 2004 | Un homme presque idéal | Vincent's mother | Christiane Lehérissey | TV movie |
| 2004 | Mon père est ingénieur | Natacha's mother | Robert Guédiguian (5) | |
| 2004 | La faucheuse à ma mère | The mother | Carole Guenot | Short |
| 2005 | Mes deux maris | Josiane | Henri Helman | TV movie |
| 2006 | En compagnie des choses | The mother | Eric-John Bretmel | Short |
| 2007 | Confidences | | Laurent Dussaux (3) | TV mini-series |
| 2007 | Suspectes | Laurent's mother | Laurent Dussaux (2) | TV mini-series |
| 2008 | Lady Jane | Solange | Robert Guédiguian (6) | |
| 2008 | Bébé | The mother | Clément Michel | Short |
| 2008-2016 | Plus belle la vie | Wanda Legendre | Several | TV series (262 episodes) |

== Bibliography ==
- Goble, Alan. The Complete Index to Literary Sources in Film. Walter de Gruyter, 1999.
