= The Wicked Dreams of Paula Schultz =

1968 film by George Marshall

- Directed by: George Marshall
- Screenplay by: Albert E. Lewin; Nat Perrin; Burt Styler
- Story by: Ken Englund
- Produced by: Edward Small
- Starring: Elke Sommer; Bob Crane; Werner Klemperer
- Cinematography: Jacques Marquette
- Edited by: Grant Whytock
- Music by: Jimmie Haskell
- Production company: Edward Small Productions
- Distributed by: United Artists
- Release date: January 3, 1968
- Running time: 113 minutes
- Country: United States
- Language: English

The Wicked Dreams of Paula Schultz is a 1968 DeLuxe Color American comedy film directed by George Marshall and starring Elke Sommer, Bob Crane, Werner Klemperer, John Banner, and Leon Askin. The screenplay, by Albert E. Lewin, Nat Perrin and Burt Styler, concerns an East German athlete who defects to the West by pole-vaulting over the Berlin Wall.

== Plot ==
Paula Schultz has been preparing to compete in the Olympic Games, but instead pole-vaults over the Berlin Wall to freedom in West Germany.

A black-market operator, Bill Mason, hides her in the home of an old Army buddy, Herb Sweeney, who now works for the CIA. Bill is willing to hand her over for a price, to either side, so a disappointed Paula returns to East Germany with propaganda minister Klaus instead. At this point, Bill comes to his senses, realizes he loves her, then disguises himself as a female athlete to get Paula back.

== Cast ==
- Elke Sommer as Paula Schultz
- Bob Crane as Bill Mason
- Werner Klemperer as Klaus
- Joey Forman as Herbert Sweeney
- John Banner as Weber
- Leon Askin as Oscar
- Maureen Arthur as Barbara Sweeney
- Theodore Marcuse as Owl (as Theo Marcuse)
- Larry D. Mann as Grossmeyer
- John Myhers as Boss
- Barbara Morrison as Klabfus
- Fritz Feld as Kessel

== Production ==
The film was based on an original screenplay by Ken Englund that independent producer Edward Small bought in 1966. Harry Tugend was hired to rewrite it.

Bob Crane was offered the lead role because of his success in Hogan's Heroes, along with three other members of the series, and the film was shot during the show's summer hiatus in 1967. Several other guest stars from the series also appeared in the film.

== Paperback novelization ==
In advance of the film's release, per the practice of the era, Popular Library released a novelization of the screenplay credited to the pseudonym of Alton Harsh (the actual author may have been Al Hine).

== Release ==
The Wicked Dreams of Paula Schultz was intended as a family comedy, and played first-run during holiday week (the last week in December) of 1967 and the first week of January 1968.

== Reception ==
Reviews were disappointing. Renata Adler of The New York Times advised: "I think you ought to skip The Wicked Dreams of Paula Schultz, because this first film of the year is so unrelievedly awful, in a number of uninteresting ways. It seems to view the cold war as a vast conspiracy to get people undressed, as clumsily and joylessly as possible. In various scenes, Miss Sommer has her sweatshirt removed by the weight of some medals on her front, her bathrobe drawn off by a vacuum cleaner, her black-lace underthings reeled in by some fishermen on a river bank, her dress split by a climb up the wall of a hotel, and so on."

Joseph Gelmis of Newsday called it "A Big, Well-Rounded Zero": "By definition, a clean dirty movie cancels itself out. It is zero, nothing. The men keep grabbing Elke and she keeps losing her clothes but preserving her virtue. And you've got to wonder what age audience the film is aimed at. It's too raunchy for a 10-year-old boy and not sexy enough for a 40-year-old boy. The slapstick is juvenile. The script is a series of tired cliches. As for Elke Sommer, someone is going to prove before long that she's really Doris Day with a bad chest cold."

The Independent Film Journal cautioned exhibitors, "The nearly two hours it takes to tell UA's The Wicked Dreams of Paula Schultz is going to make it difficult to package the elongated burlesque skit with another feature. Yet by itself the entry's chances appear slim, having to rely on the sex appeal of its star Elke Sommer, the TV following of her co-star Bob Crane, and its general low-comedy appeal. George Marshall directed this old-fashioned farce as though it were Ladies Night in a Turkish Bath. Dreams should do best in the less sophisticated territories where patrons may find the picture's obvious humor to their liking."

The film had only a short run in theaters.

== Later references ==
Quentin Tarantino appropriated the titular character's name for the title of Chapter 7 ("The Lonely Grave of Paula Schultz") for his film Kill Bill Vol. 2. Tarantino also used the name for the wife of the character Dr. King Schultz (Christoph Waltz) in the film Django Unchained.

== See also ==
- List of American films of 1968
- List of films set in Berlin
- Cold War
