= Les Branchés à Saint-Tropez =

Les Branchés à Saint-Tropez ("The Fashioned in Saint- Tropez") (1983) is a French B movie by Max Pécas.

It was a very big success when it came out in the theaters.

It is the first part of Max Pécas's "Saint-Tropez" trilogy, the two other movies being: Deux enfoirés à Saint-Tropez and On se calme et on boit frais à Saint-Tropez.

== Cast ==
- Yves Thuillier
- Xavier Deluc
- Olivia Dutronc
- Marcel Gassouk as a policeman
- Ticky Holgado as Ticky
- Andrée Damant as Madame Bardaut
