= Xavier Deluc =

French actor, director and scriptwriter

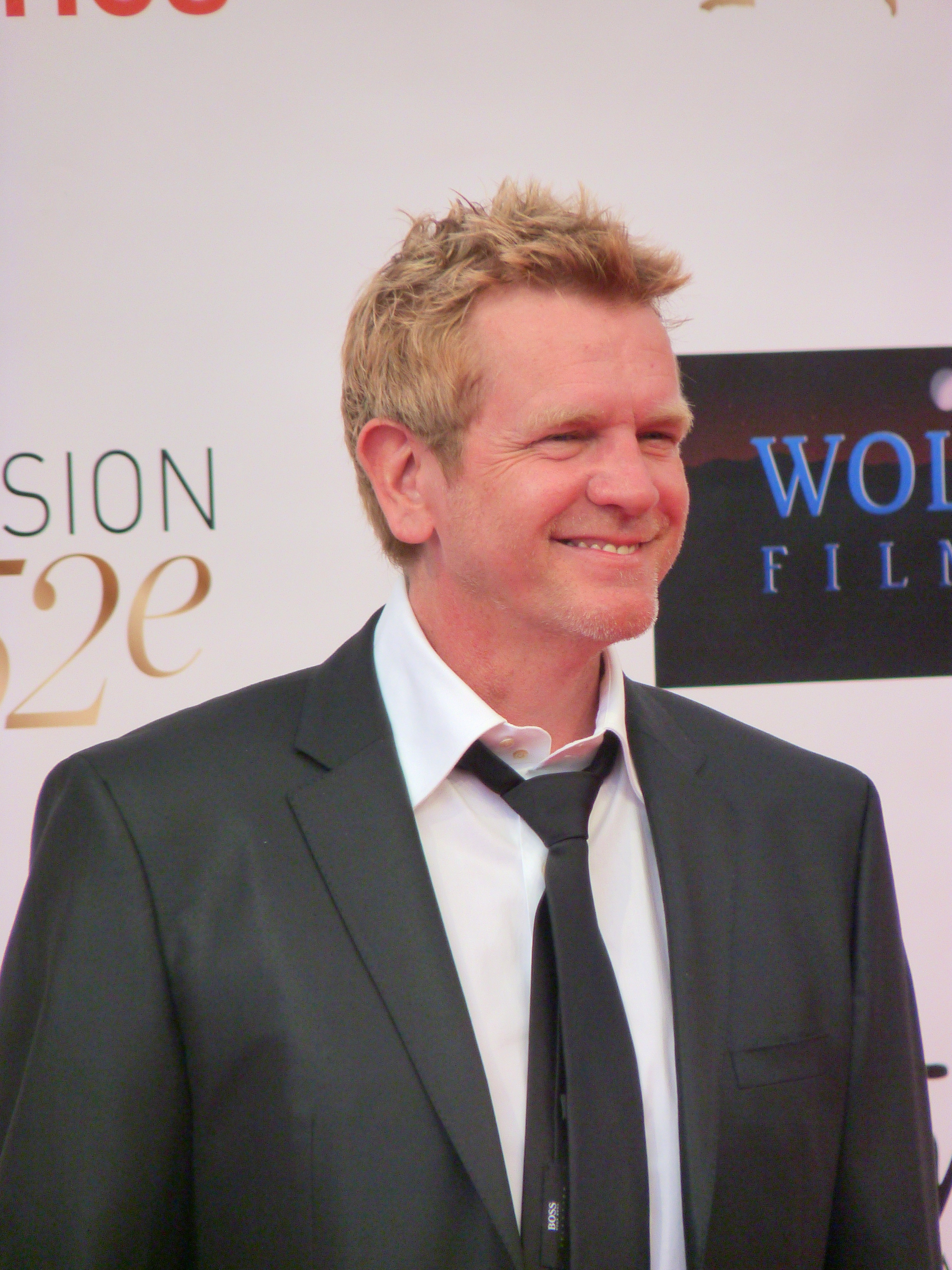
- Born: Xavier Lepetit; 18 March 1958 (age 68); Caen, Calvados, France
- Occupations: actor, director and scriptwriter
- Years active: 2002–present
- Website: www.xavierdeluc.com

Xavier Deluc (born 18 March 1958) is a French actor, director and scriptwriter. He is most known for acting in TV series such as 'Marc Eliot' (a French police drama), Dolmen (Brittany based family drama) and 12 seasons of 'Research Unit' (another specialized French police drama) as 'Captain Martin Bernier', and starring role in movies including He Died with His Eyes Open in 1985 and Captive in 1986.

== Biography ==
=== Childhood and training ===
Xavier Lepetit was born in Caen in Calvados. His childhood was spent in Jacob-Mesnil, a hamlet just near Bretteville-sur-Laize. He was raised in boarding school in Lisieux. When he turned 14 he got involved in amateur dramatics and performed in his first short film.

Aged twenty, he went to Paris and enrolls in the Cours Florent (a private drama school). The actor Robert Hossein then noticed him. Xavier recalls that "I was the only blond, - I was taken !". Hossein then gave him his first role as the young 'Edgar Linton' in his play 'Les Hauts de Hurlevent' (Wuthering Heights by Emily Brontë), performed in the theater of Boulogne-Billancourt and Lyon in 1979.

== Career ==
It was under his birth name, Xavier Lepetit while aged 22, that he debuted in his first film Les surdoués de la première compagnie, directed by Michel Gérard in 1981, before joining Max Pécas for Belles, blondes et bronzées (also in 1981) and Les Branchés à Saint-Tropez in 1983.

In 1984, he was in Yannick Bellon's film La Triche (The Cheat), a distributor then asked him to take a pseudonym to improve the posters. The actor thought of his weekends in Luc-sur-Mer on the Côte de Nacre, where he spent a lot of his time, he then becomes Xavier Deluc. Thanks to his performance in the film, he was named as the most promising actor at the 10th César ceremony of 1985. Then the following year, at the 11th ceremony of the César, where he is nominated as the best actor in a supporting role for He Died with His Eyes Open by Jacques Deray, just after completing Robert Kramer's science-fiction film Diesel in 1985.

He is also a theater actor, performing in Jean-Claude Brisville's The Blue Villa at Espace Cardin theatre (Paris) in 1986. He then met director Jean Marais at the Théâtre des Bouffes-Parisiens to don 'Hans' costume in Jean Cocteau's play Bacchus in 1988. Xavier later said about Jean Marais, that "I did not know how to die and (he) taught me to die on stage".

In 1989, he starred with James Wilby and Serena Gordon in a two-part TV mini-series of A Tale of Two Cities for ITV Granada. The production also aired on Masterpiece Theatre on the PBS in the United States.

In 1991, he started a campaign called 'No to drugs, Yes to life' based on his own previous drug abuse, he then staged his self=written play called 'La Pluie du Soleil' (or "The rain of the sun") performed at the Comédie-Caumartin theater.

In 1991 he also recorded a duet single with Viktor Lazlo called "Baiser sacré" on the Polydor label.

From 1998 to 2005, he starred in the Marc Eliot television series and then in 2006, he landed his most important role in his television career, performing the Major, then Lieutenant, then Captain Martin Bernier, main character of the series 'Research Unit', which in 2018 reached the twelfth season, with him being the only surviving cast member since the start.

In 2007, he wrote and directed his first feature film 'Tombé d'un étoile' in which he co-starred alongside Thomas Sagols, Rona Hartner and Jean-Louis Tribes. He was awarded the Best Direction Award at the Monaco International Film Festival in May 2009.

== Personal life ==
He joined the Church of Scientology in 1988, and founded with it, in 1991, the campaign 'No to drugs, yes to life'.

He has a wife, who is an amateur photographer, a daughter-in-law, and is the grandfather of two girls.

He wrote his first novel 'Ton echo does not die', published by France Europe Editions in 2007.

He also sketches, and exhibited his drawings at the Galerie des Lombards in Mougins on the French Riviera.

== Selected filmography ==
Year	Film	Role	Director	Notes
1983	Les branchés à Saint-Tropez	Christian	Max Pécas	(credited under Xavier Lepetit)
1985	The Temptation of Isabelle	Alain	Jacques Doillon	
1986	States of Soul	Michel	Jacques Fansten	
1986	Captive	D.	Paul Mayersberg	It was filmed in London.
1986	Good Weather, But Stormy Late This Afternoon	Bernard	Gérard Frot-Coutaz	
1986	Cours privé	Laurent	Pierre Granier-Deferre	He is teacher and seduces Elisabeth Bourgine,
1987	The Brute	Jacques Vauthier	Claude Guillemot	
1987	Cayenne Palace	Mathieu	Alain Maline	
1988	Let Sleeping Cops Lie	Lutz	José Pinheiro	
1998	The Pianist	Larsen	Mario Gas	
2004	Les parisiens	Pierre	Claude Lelouch	
2006	A Spring in Paris (Un printemps à Paris)	Hélène's friend	Jacques Bral	
2006	Marié(s) ou presque (Un printemps à Paris)	Philippe, the VRP	Franck Llopis	

== Awards ==
- International Film Festival of Monaco 2009: Best Direction Award for his film Fallen from a star (Tombé d'une étoile)
