= Brigade des mœurs =

- Directed by: Max Pécas
- Written by: Roger Le Taillanter; Marc Pécas; Max Pécas
- Produced by: Max Pécas
- Starring: Thierry de Carbonnières; Gabrielle Forest; Christian Barbier; Jean-Marc Maurel; Phify
- Cinematography: Jean-Claude Couty
- Edited by: François Ceppi
- Music by: Léo Carrier; Jean-Paul Daine
- Distributed by: Imp.Ex.Ci.
- Release date: 9 January 1985
- Running time: 96 minutes
- Country: France
- Language: French

Brigade des mœurs (French: Vice Squad) (1985) is a French B movie by Max Pécas. It was released in the United States on DVD as Brigade of Death.

== Plot ==
When the investigation on a prostitute murder by the Paris vice department derails, one cop will stop at nothing for revenge.

== Cast ==
- Thierry de Carbonnières as Gérard Lattuada
- Gabrielle Forest as Sylvie
- Christian Barbier as Robert Capes
- Jean-Marc Maurel as Costa
- Phify as Gros Louis
- Pascale Roberts
