= Douce violence (film) =

- Directed by: Max Pécas
- Written by: Jacques Aucante
- Starring: Elke Sommer; Pierre Brice; Christian Pezey; Vittoria Prada
- Music by: Georges Garvarentz
- Distributed by: Audubon Films (United States)
- Release date: 7 March 1962
- Running time: 88 minutes
- Country: France
- Language: French

Douce violence is a 1962 French drama film directed by Max Pécas and starring Elke Sommer, Pierre Brice, Christian Pezey and Vittoria Prada.

== Plot ==
An alienated young man living on the Côte d'Azur is lured into joining a gang of petty young criminals, but soon realises he has made a mistake.

== Cast ==
- Elke Sommer - Elke
- Pierre Brice - Maddy
- Agnès Spaak - Dominique
- Claire Maurier - Claire
- Christian Pezey - Olivier
- Vittoria Prada - Barbara
- Jenny Astruc - Mick
- Michèle Bardollet - Choutte
