= Les parisiens =

- Directed by: Claude Lelouch
- Written by: Claude Lelouch; Pierre Uytterhoeven
- Produced by: Claude Lelouch; Jean-Paul De Vidas
- Starring: Mathilde Seigner; Maïwenn; Arielle Dombasle; Agnès Soral; Alessandra Martines
- Cinematography: Gérard de Battista
- Edited by: Stéphane Mazalaigue
- Music by: Francis Lai
- Distributed by: Les Films 13
- Release date: 15 September 2004 (France)
- Running time: 119 minutes
- Country: France
- Languages: French; Italian
- Budget: $6.8 million
- Box office: $2.1 million

Les Parisiens (first part of the Le Genre humain trilogy) is a film directed by Claude Lelouch, released 15 September 2004.

== Synopsis ==
A string of characters, often marginal, form part of what one might call the "love Richter Scale" and intersect, forming Prévert inventory. Among them, two singers, Shaa and Massimo fall in love, and share their story.

== Starring ==
- Maïwenn : Shaa
- Mathilde Seigner : Clémentine / Anne
- Arielle Dombasle : Sabine Duchemin
- Xavier Deluc : Pierre
- Agnès Soral : Pierre's wife
- Michèle Bernier : Tania
- Ticky Holgado : God
- Lise Lamétrie : Lise
- Francis Perrin : Didier
- Grégori Derangère : The hustler
- Evelyne Buyle : The woman of the train
- Antoine Duléry : The bartender
- André Falcon : The jewelry director
- Mireille Perrier : The woman on the docks
- Charles Gérard : Jewelry client
- Frédéric Bouraly

== About ==
- Claude Lelouch financed the production of this film himself, through his company, Les Films 13, to the tune of €10M. He acknowledged that it was a major risk, and may have led to his personal ruin.
- On its release date, the film only sold 4,162 tickets, representing a major disappointment. Upset by this, Claude Lelouch offered free tickets to people around Paris on 17 September 2004 up to 19:00. However, by the end of the week, les Parisiens still only had 130,649 viewers.
- The film is dedicated to Ticky Holgado, who died in January 2004.

== See also ==
- Le Courage d'aimer (recutting of Parisiens and scenes from the second part of the unfinished Le Genre Humain trilogy)
