= Daniella by Night =

1961 film

- Directed by: Max Pécas
- Written by: Grisha Dabat; Wolfgang Steinhardt
- Based on: Daniela by Walter Ebert
- Produced by: René Thévenet
- Starring: Elke Sommer; Ivan Desny; Danik Patisson
- Cinematography: André Germain
- Edited by: Paul Cayatte
- Music by: Charles Aznavour; Georges Garvarentz
- Production company: Paris Interproductions
- Distributed by: Francinor
- Release date: 28 April 1961
- Running time: 98 minutes
- Countries: France; West Germany
- Language: French

Daniella by Night (French: De quoi tu te mêles Daniela!, German: Zarte Haut in schwarzer Seide) is a 1961 French-West German spy thriller film directed by Max Pécas and starring Elke Sommer, Ivan Desny and Danik Patisson. It was based on the novel Daniela by Walter Ebert. It was Sommer's first of several spy films, but was largely an exploitation film featuring several nude scenes.

== Synopsis ==
International model Daniella is urgently summoned to Rome to appear for Count Castellani's fashion house after the previous model was murdered. She soon discovers that it is a front for a smuggling operation.

== Cast ==
- Ivan Desny as Count Castellani
- Elke Sommer as Daniella
- Danik Patisson as Claudine
- Helmut Schmid as Karl Bauer
- René Dary as Lanzac
- Sandrine as Mannequin
- Claire Maurier as Esmerelda
- Brigitte Banz as Mannequin
- Françoise Alban
- Jean-Louis Boucher
- Albert Dinan
- André Dumas
- Paulette Frantz
- Romana Rombach
- Richard Saint-Bris
- Pierre Sylvere
- Roger Trécan

== Reception ==
Writing for The Valley News, Ali Sar criticized the film for its lack of character development and for its loud and disturbing music. He notes that the "exotic dance scenes" have no bearing on the film's plot.

== Bibliography ==
- Goble, Alan. The Complete Index to Literary Sources in Film. Walter de Gruyter, 1999.
- Lisanti, Tom & Paul, Louis. Film Fatales: Women in Espionage Films and Television, 1962-1973. McFarland, 2002.
