= La Baie du désir =

1964 film

- Original movie poster
- Directed by: Max Pécas; Radley Metzger (uncredited)
- Screenplay by: Max Pécas; Maurice Cury; Robert Topart
- Story by: Max Pécas; Maurice Cury; Robert Topart
- Starring: Fabienne Dali; Sophie Hardy; Jean Valmont; François Dyrek
- Cinematography: Roger Duculot
- Edited by: Nicole Colombier
- Music by: Georges Garvarentz
- Production companies: Alcinter; Les Films du Griffon; Unicité
- Distributed by: Audubon Films (US)
- Release date: 1964
- Running time: 95 minutes (France)
- Country: France
- Language: French

La Baie du désir (also known as The Erotic Touch) is a 1964 French erotic drama film directed by Max Pécas and Radley Metzger (uncredited).

== Plot ==
A young couple becomes entangled with a younger woman, resulting in tragic consequences.

== Cast ==
- Fabienne Dali ... Greta / La maitresse / la femme
- Sophie Hardy ... Mathias / La cousine
- Jean Valmont ... Claude / L'amant de Fabienne
- François Dyrek ... The father/ Le braconnier

== Notes ==
According to one film reviewer, Radley Metzger's films, including those made during the Golden Age of Porn (1969–1984), are noted for their "lavish design, witty screenplays, and a penchant for the unusual camera angle". Another reviewer noted that his films were "highly artistic — and often cerebral ... and often featured gorgeous cinematography". Film and audio works by Metzger have been added to the permanent collection of the Museum of Modern Art (MoMA) in New York City.
