= Boy, Did I Get a Wrong Number! =

1966 film by George Marshall

- Theatrical release poster.
- Directed by: George Marshall
- Screenplay by: George Kennett; Albert E. Lewin; Burt Styler
- Story by: George Beck
- Produced by: Edward Small
- Starring: Bob Hope; Elke Sommer; Phyllis Diller; Cesare Danova; Marjorie Lord
- Cinematography: Lionel Lindon
- Edited by: Grant Whytock
- Music by: William "By" Dunham; Richard LaSalle
- Production company: Edward Small Productions
- Distributed by: United Artists
- Release date: June 8, 1966
- Running time: 99 minutes
- Country: United States
- Box office: $4.3 million (est. US/ Canada rentals)

Boy, Did I Get a Wrong Number! is a 1966 American DeLuxe Color comedy film directed by George Marshall and starring Bob Hope, Elke Sommer and Phyllis Diller. It was written by George Kennett, Albert E. Lewin and Burt Styler from a story by George Beck.

This film was the first of three film collaborations for Hope and Diller, and was followed by Eight on the Lam (1967) and The Private Navy of Sgt. O'Farrell (1968).

== Plot ==
French actress Didi has become more famous for bubble bath commercials than her acting. She runs away for a while to Oregon, where she encounters middle-aged married realtor Tom Meade who agrees to assist her, and becomes enmeshed in various complications when he and his wacky housekeeper try to hide her from his wife and the public.

Everyone is convinced Meade and Didi are having an affair. He is suspected of murdering her when neighbors see him carrying her half-dressed body - she had taken too many sleeping pills and Meade was putting her to bed. A police chase ends with cars plowing into a soap factory, with all concerned emerging from a cloud of suds and Didi's career Svengali finally agreeing that she needs a vacation from bubble baths.

== Cast ==
- Bob Hope as Tom Meade
- Elke Sommer as Didi
- Phyllis Diller as Lily
- Cesare Danova as Pepe Pepponi
- Marjorie Lord as Mrs. Martha Meade
- Kelly Thordsen as Detective Shawn Regan
- Benny Baker as Detective Lt. Schwartz
- Terry Burnham as Doris Meade
- Joyce Jameson as telephone operator
- Harry von Zell as newscaster / off-screen narrator
- Kevin Burchett as Larry Meade
- Keith Taylor as Plympton

== Production ==
The film was Bob Hope's second with Edward Small. Filming started in October 1965. It marked Phyllis Diller's film debut as a lead – she signed for five more pictures with Hope.

== Reception ==
With Bob Hope's film career on the downswing by the '60s, Boy, Did I Get a Wrong Number! was critically panned and compared to a "90-minute TV sitcom".

The critic for The New York Times drew parallels with Up in Mabel's Room which Edward Small had made twenty years previously. Reviews were poor. However it performed well at the box office. Boy, Did I Get a Wrong Number! was listed in the 1978 book The Fifty Worst Films of All Time.

== See also ==
- List of American films of 1966
