= The Hostages (1973 film) =

1973 film

- Film poster
- Directed by: Édouard Molinaro
- Screenplay by: Alphonse Boudard
- Starring: Daniel Cauchy; Bulle Ogier; Gilles Ségal
- Cinematography: Raoul Coutard
- Edited by: Monique Isnardon; Robert Isnardon
- Music by: Michel Legrand
- Production companies: Citeca Productions; S.N.E. Gaumont; Medusa Distribuzione
- Release dates: February 1, 1973 (France); April 10, 1973 (Italy)
- Running time: 90 minutes
- Countries: France; Italy

The Hostages (French: Le Gang des otages) is a 1973 crime film directed by Édouard Molinaro. It stars Daniel Cauchy, Bulle Ogier and Gilles Ségal. It was shot at the Billancourt Studios in Paris and on location around the city. The film's sets were designed by the art director Louis Le Barbenchon.

== Cast ==
- Daniel Cauchy as Gilbert Nodier
- Bulle Ogier as Liliane Guerec Nodier
- Gilles Ségal as Serge Donati
- Gérard Darrieu as Maurice Perret
- Michel Favory as Maître Meyer
- Maurice Travail as Le juge Imbert
- Ginette Garcin as Ginette Bertheau
- Germaine Delbat as Madame Roques dite Marraine
- Simone Rieutor as Monique Descamps
- Armand Mestral as Le commissaire Crenoy
- Claire Maurier as Nelly Cerutti
- Gabriel Cattand as Charles Aubrey dit Charlot
- Robert Favart as Ange Cerutti
- Maurice Barrier as Jo Franck
- Fabrizio Jovine as Le gitan
- Pippo Merisi as Le greffier
- Evelyne Dress as Colette
- Christian Barbier as Le brigadier de gendarmerie Fernand Vérot
- Michel Duplaix as Un inspecteur
- Pierre Collet as Raymond Roques dit Parrain
- Evelyne Dassas as La première prostituée
- André Dumas as Le reporter d'Europe 1
- Henri Attal as Le prisonnier avec la soupe

== Production ==
The Hostages was shot between August 7 to October 15, 1972. It was a French and Italian co-production between the Paris-based Citeca Productions and SNE Gaumont, and the Rome-based Medusa Distribuzione.

== Release ==
The Hostages was shown in France February 1, 1973 as Le Gang des otages (lit. 'The Hostages' Gang'). It was later shown in Italy on April 10, 1973, as Quelli della banda Beretta and on July 19, 1974, in Boston as The Hostages.

== Bibliography ==
- Curti, Roberto; Lafond, Frank (2026). French Thrillers of the 1970s: Volume I, Crime Films. Jefferson, North Carolina: McFarland & Company. ISBN 978-1-4766-8681-3. LCCN 2025048366.
- Rège, Philippe (2009). Encyclopedia of French Film Directors. Vol. 1. Scarecrow Press.
