= A Bad Son =

- Theatrical release poster
- Directed by: Claude Sautet
- Written by: Claude Sautet; Daniel Biasini; Jean-Paul Török
- Produced by: Alain Sarde; Roland Girard
- Starring: Patrick Dewaere; Yves Robert; Brigitte Fossey; Jacques Dufilho; Claire Maurier
- Cinematography: Jean Boffety
- Edited by: Jacqueline Thiédot
- Music by: Philippe Sarde
- Distributed by: Parafrance
- Release date: 15 October 1980
- Running time: 110 minutes
- Country: France
- Language: French

A Bad Son (French: Un mauvais fils) is a 1980 French drama film directed by Claude Sautet. It tells the story of a young man who is sent back to France after a sentence for narcotics in the USA and tries to restart his life, but has difficulty relating to his widowed father and suffers the pain of falling in love with a girl who is an addict.

== Plot ==
After five years in a US prison for drug dealing, Bruno arrives back in Paris and goes to his father's apartment, his mother having died while he was in jail. His father is supportive and next night takes him out, but explodes in rage when Bruno asks two prostitutes to their table, saying that it was his fault that his mother died of barbiturates. Bruno moves out and finds manual work, though he trained as a cabinet maker.

When he pays a compulsory visit to a rehabilitation clinic, they suggest a more congenial job in a bookshop that has already taken Catherine, a recovering addict. She and Bruno fall for each other and he moves into her apartment, though the bookseller warns him that she still uses drugs. Wanting to reconcile with his father, he goes round early in the morning to find him in bed with Madeleine, his mother's best friend. When Madeleine explains that this is a longstanding relationship, Bruno explodes in rage, saying it was their fault that his mother killed herself.

Catherine's addiction reaches the point where she voluntarily goes back into hospital and Bruno leaves the bookshop, finding work with a cabinet maker. In a café he sees Madeleine, who says that his father is crippled after a work accident and she has left him. Bruno goes round to his father's apartment and, while there, tries to ring Catherine.

== Cast ==
- Patrick Dewaere - Bruno Calgagni
- Yves Robert - René Calgagni
- Brigitte Fossey - Catherine
- Jacques Dufilho - Adrien Dussart
- Claire Maurier - Madeleine
- Étienne Chicot - Serge
- Antoine Bourseiller - mental hygiene psychologist
- Franck-Olivier Bonnet - boss of the transport company
- Laure Duthilleul
