= Julien Fontanes, magistrat =

- Created by: Gilles Perrault; Jean Cosmos
- Starring: Jacques Morel
- Country of origin: France
- No. of episodes: 25

Production
- Running time: 90 minutes

Original release
- Network: TF1 (France)
- Release: February 27, 1980 – June 1, 1989

Julien Fontanes, magistrat is a French police television series. It has been distributed since 1980 on TF1 (France), the show remains active as of 1989.

== Plot ==
This series features Julien Fontanes, judge by the Ministry of Justice to review the files clemency.

== Cast ==
=== Main characters ===
- Jacques Morel as Judge Julien Fontanes
- André Falcon as The Cardonnois
- Jean-Claude Calon as Patrick
- Françoise Fleury as Hélène

=== Recurring characters ===
- Jacques Lalande as Taybosc
- Antoinette Moya as Marthe
- Jacques Alric as Robert
- Jacqueline Doyen as Sophie Legros
- Victor Garrivier as Commissioner Pagnoz
- Jean-Claude Narcy as TV Host
- Odette Laure as Mémaine
- Paul Bisciglia as Albert Piot
- Georges Werler as Doctor Combes
- Michel Tugot-Doris as Bordier
- Corinne Lahaye as Isabelle
- Jean-Marie Bernicat as Brulier
- Yves Arcanel as The Houen
- Philippe Moreau as Blériot

=== Guest ===
- Bernard Le Coq as Judge Gallie
- Françoise Brion as Madame The Cardonnois
- Serge Sauvion as René Leych
- André Valardy as Robert
- Max Doria as Ludovic
- Bruno Masure as Journalist
- Marie-Laure Augry as Journalist
- Thierry Beccaro as Journalist
- Jean-Pierre Darras as M. Carré
- Jean-Michel Dupuis as Jacky Balkowiacz / Nono
- Jacques Dynam as Léon Boueix
- Maurice Chevit as Banyuls
- Marc Chapiteau as Valério
- Odile Versois as Inge Wolfrum
- Gérard Darrieu as Émile Digoin
- Jacques Balutin as Michel Courban
- Hugues Quester as Judge Maxime Rubod
- François Cluzet as Bob Mourèze
- Catherine Sauvage as Clarisse Salvignat
- Myriam Boyer as Norma Lagneau
- Jean Martinelli as Alain Lavernat
- Yves Barsacq as Louis Ferrato
- Raymond Gérôme as Jean-Claude Lorentzen
- Julien Bertheau as Paul Dissiedky
- Sophie Renoir as Gina
- Souad Amidou as Mina
- Pierre Maguelon as André
- Daniel Russo as Antoine Gissac
- France Anglade as Liliane
- Gabriel Cattand as René de Senover
- Michel Creton as Jacques Fouleix
- Christian Barbier as Jeff Stenay
- Jacques François as Quinzac
- Annick Alane as Zoutie
- Ronny Coutteure as Albert
- Dora Doll as Madeleine Mignot
- Marie Déa as Irma Dissiesky
- Michel Beaune as Bonsmoulins
- Pierre Doris as René Kembs
- Catherine Jacob as Dany
- Paulette Dubost as Mémée Plantini
- Jean Benguigui as Didier Lamiral
- François Dyrek as Marcellin
- Michel Berto as Fedry
- Roland Blanche as Beno
- Gabriel Jabbour as Vestria
- Nathalie Roussel as Rose
- Marion Game as Sonia
- Jean-Pierre Bernard as Dany Mandina
- Henry Djanik as Carbuccia
- Jean Martin as The prefect
- Philippe Nahon as The cop
- Benoît Allemane as Jacques Nohant
- Philippe Laudenbach as Father Marc Bolleret
- Liliane Rovère as Rolande Gripport
- Antoine Duléry as Espère
- Dominique Pinon

== Directors ==
- Guy Lefranc (6 Episodes)
- François Dupont-Midi (4 Episodes)
- Jean-Pierre Decourt, Daniel Moosmann & André Farwagi (2 Episodes)
- Bernard Toublanc-Michel, Patrick Jamain, Jean Pignol, Serge Friedman & Michel Berny (1 Episode)

== See also ==
- List of French television series
