= Franck-Olivier Bonnet =

Belgian actor (1946–2013)

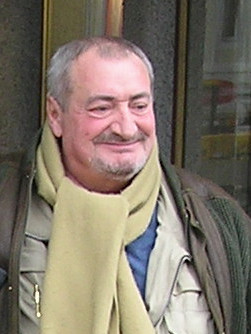
- Franck-Olivier Bonnet in Marseille in 2007
- Born: Jean-Paul Maurice Ghislain Bonnet; 21 June 1946; Tournai, Belgium
- Died: 25 March 2013 (aged 66); Paris, France
- Occupation: Actor

Franck-Olivier Bonnet (21 June 1946 – 25 March 2013) was a Belgian-born French actor.

== Biography ==
After military service he went to Paris in 1966 and would locate there.

He died at the end of March 2013 at the Lariboisière Hospital in Paris from cancer and was cremated on April 11 at the Père Lachaise crematorium.

== Selected filmography ==
=== Movies ===
- The Police War (1979) as René
- C'est pas moi, c'est lui (1979) as military
- A Bad Son (1980) as the boss of the transport company
- Quest for Fire (1980) as Aghoo
- Men Prefer Fat Girls (1981) as the muscular neighbor
- Le Choc (1981) as Silvio
- Le gendarme et les gendarmettes (1982) as the big arm
- Équateur (1982) as the man from Lyon
- Gramps Is in the Resistance (1983) as Ralph
- P'tit Con (1983)
- Le téléphone sonne toujours deux fois!! (1985)
- La Crise (1993) as Bébert
- The Visitors II: The Corridors of Time (1998) as Boniface
- American Cuisine (1998) as the first policeman
- Asterix and Obelix vs. Caesar (1999)
- Amélie (2001)
