= Max Doria =

French actor

- Born: 20 November 1896; Amiens, France
- Died: 19 December 1989 (aged 93)
- Occupation: Actor

Max Doria (20 November 1896 in Amiens, France - 19 December 1989) was a French actor.

== Filmography ==
- 1980-83 : Julien Fontanes, magistrat
