= Elke Sommer =

German-American actress (1940–2026)

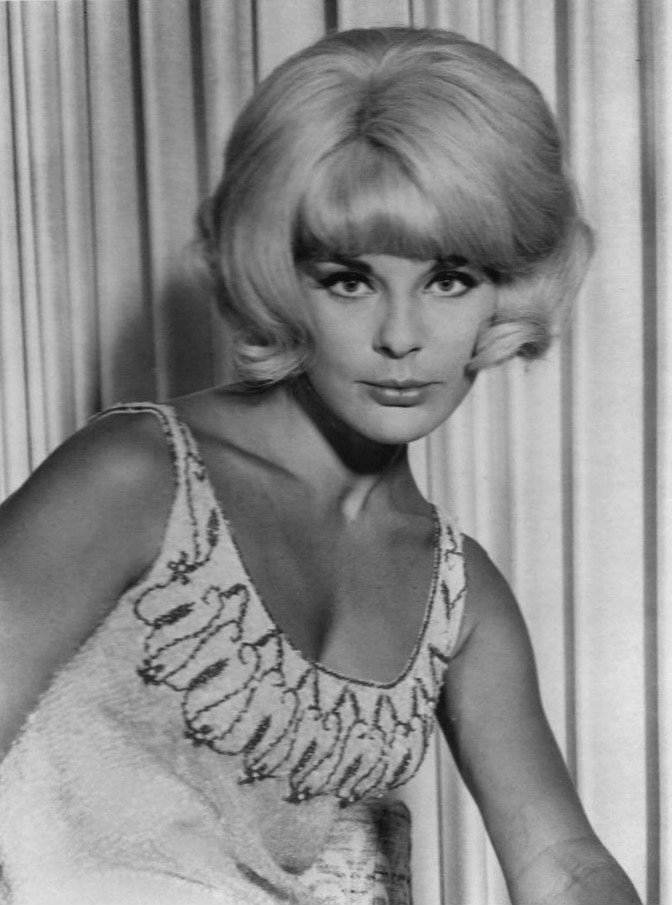
- Sommer in 1965
- Born: Elke von Schletz; 5 November 1940; Berlin, Nazi Germany
- Died: 28 October 2026 (aged 85); Los Angeles, California, United States
- Occupations: Actress; singer
- Years active: 1959–2017
- Spouses: Joe Hyams (m. 1964; div. 1981); Wolf Walther (m. 1993; died 2026)

Signature
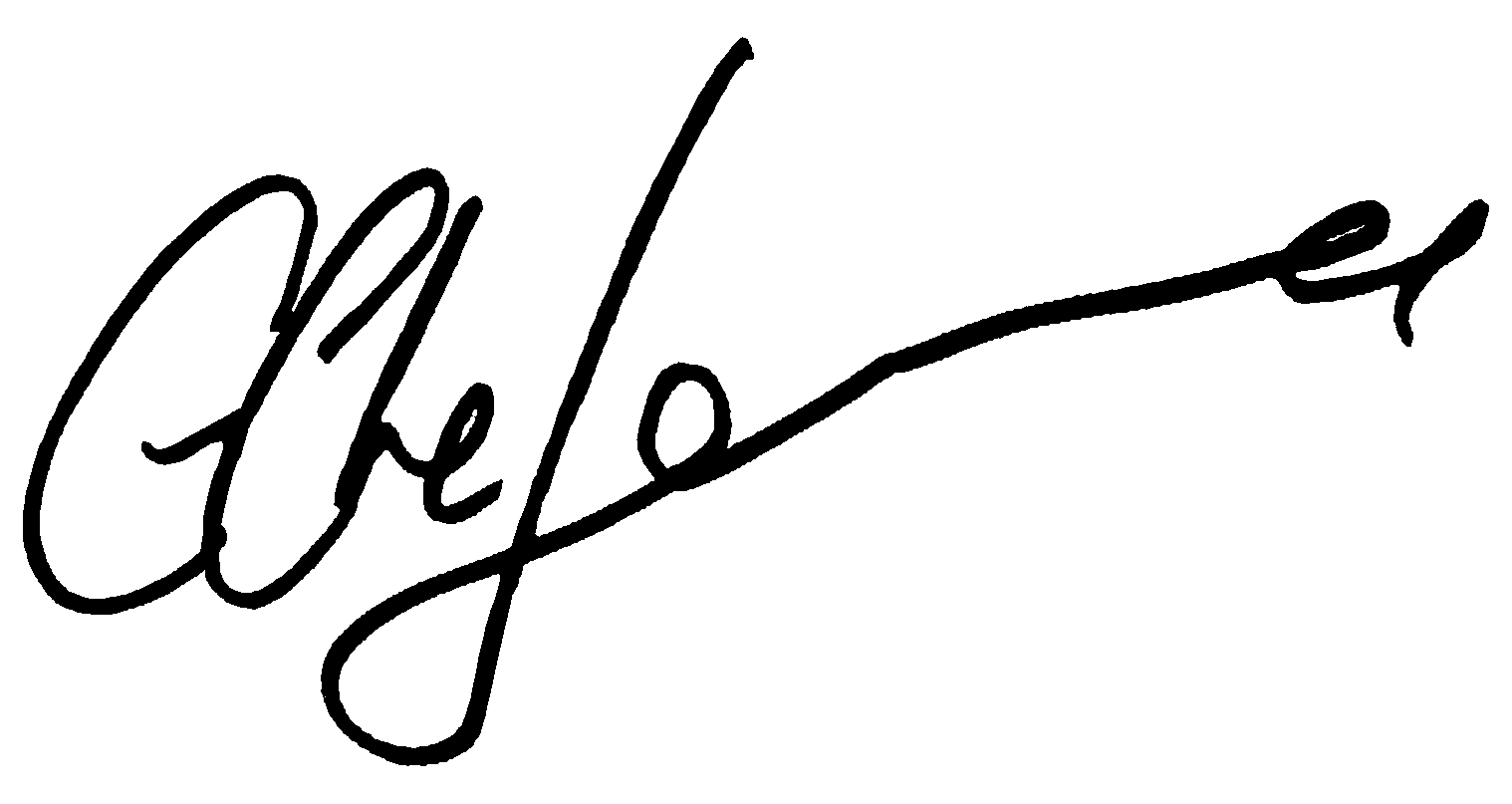

Elke Sommer (German: [ˈɛl.kə ˈzɔ.mɐ]; née von Schletz; 5 November 1940 – 28 October 2026) was a German actress who appeared in numerous films throughout the 1960s and 1970s, including roles in The Pink Panther sequel A Shot in the Dark (1964), the Bob Hope comedy Boy, Did I Get a Wrong Number! (1966), Agatha Christie's And Then There Were None (1974), and the British Carry On series in Carry On Behind (1975).

== Early life ==
Sommer was born Elke von Schletz in Berlin, Nazi Germany, to Baron Peter von Schletz, a Lutheran minister, and his wife, Renata (née Topp). In 1942, during the Second World War, the family was evacuated to Niederndorf, near Erlangen in Franconia. Beginning in 1950, she attended a gymnasium (university-preparatory secondary school). Her father died when she was 14. She was good at languages but struggled with mathematics and science, and left school in 1957 with her mother's permission. Later that year, she moved to London, where she worked as an au pair for the family of the future actress Vicki Michelle while attending an English-language institute.

== Career ==
=== Discovery ===
Sommer was spotted by the film director Vittorio De Sica while on holiday in Italy. She began appearing in films there in 1958. Also that year, she changed her surname from Schletz to Sommer. She soon became a sex symbol and moved to Hollywood in the early 1960s. Sommer became one of the more popular pin-up girls of the time, posing for pictorials in the September 1964 and December 1967 issues of Playboy magazine.

=== 1960s ===
Sommer became one of the most active film actresses of the 1960s. She made 99 film and television appearances from 1959 to 2005, including The Prize (1963) with Paul Newman, A Shot in the Dark (1964) with Peter Sellers, The Art of Love (1965) with James Garner and Dick Van Dyke, The Oscar (1966) with Stephen Boyd, Boy, Did I Get a Wrong Number! (1966) with Bob Hope, the Bulldog Drummond extravaganza Deadlier Than the Male (1966), The Wrecking Crew (1968) with Dean Martin and Sharon Tate, and The Wicked Dreams of Paula Schultz (1968); in each of these films she was the leading lady.

In 1964, she won a Golden Globe award as Most Promising Newcomer Actress for The Prize, a film in which she co-starred with Paul Newman and Edward G. Robinson.

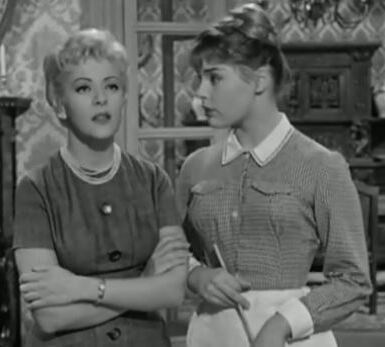
Sommer (right) with Mexican actress Silvia Pinal in the Italian film Men and Noblemen (1959)

A frequent guest on television, Sommer sang and participated in comedy sketches on episodes of The Andy Williams Show and The Dean Martin Show as well as Bob Hope specials and 10 appearances on The Tonight Show Starring Johnny Carson.

=== 1970s ===
Sommer's films during the 1970s included the thriller Zeppelin, in which she co-starred with Michael York, and a 1974 remake of Agatha Christie's murder mystery Ten Little Indians. In 1972, she starred in two Italian horror films directed by Mario Bava: Baron Blood and Lisa and the Devil. In 1975, Sommer went back to Italy to act in additional scenes for Lisa and the Devil, which its producer inserted into the film to convert it to House of Exorcism against the wishes of the director.

In 1975, Peter Rogers cast her in the British comedy Carry On Behind as the Russian Professor Vrooshka. She became the Carry On films' joint highest-paid performer, at £30,000; this was an honour that she shared with Phil Silvers (who starred in Follow That Camel).

Most of her movie work during the decade came in European films. After the 1979 comedy The Prisoner of Zenda, which reunited her with Sellers, the actress did virtually no more acting in Hollywood films, concentrating more on her artwork.

Sommer also performed as a singer, recording and releasing several albums.

=== Later work ===
In the 1980s, Sommer hosted a syndicated programme titled The Exciting World of Speed and Beauty.

After the 1990s, Sommer concentrated more on painting than on acting. As an actress, she had worked in six countries learning their languages (she spoke seven languages) and storing images which she has expressed on canvas. Her artwork shows the strong influence of Marc Chagall.

Sommer was embroiled in a long-running feud with Zsa Zsa Gabor that began in 1984 when both appeared on Circus of the Stars. The feud escalated into a multimillion-dollar libel suit by 1993, resulting in Sommer being awarded $3.3-million in damages from Gabor and her husband, Frederick von Anhalt, for defaming her in interviews published in a pair of German publications in 1990.

In 2001, a Golden Palm Star on the Palm Springs Walk of Stars was dedicated to her.

She provided the voice of Yzma in the German version of The Emperor's New Groove.

== Personal life and death ==
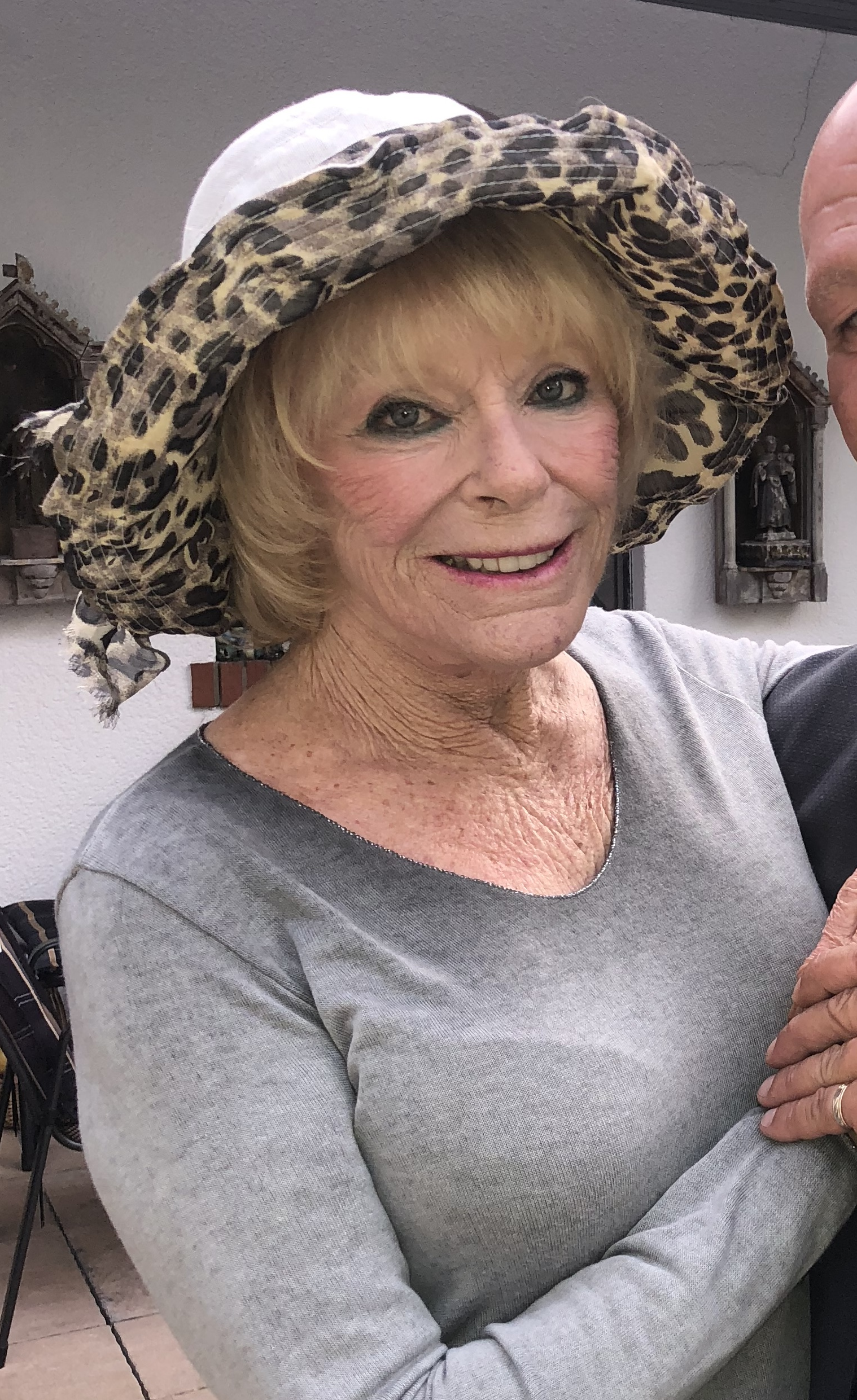
Sommer in 2018

In 1964, Sommer married the Hollywood columnist Joe Hyams in Las Vegas. Hyams filed for divorce in 1981, stating that the marriage had been "the best 17 years of my life" but that Sommer needed her independence to be happy.

While appearing in the play Tamara in 1989, Sommer met Wolf Walther, the managing director of Essex House in New York City. They married in Franconia, Germany, on 29 August 1993. Following their honeymoon, Walther moved to Los Angeles with her. In a 2014 interview, Sommer described how she and Walther met:

I was in New York City starring in Tamara and had to stay there for four months. So, I had to find an apartment but they were excruciatingly expensive, tiny and loud. As I knew the managing director of the Essex House, I wanted to talk to him about renting a room but the hotel had a new managing director, a man by the name of Wolf Walther. So we met. For him, it was love at first sight. For me, it took a little longer, but not much longer. As you may know, Tamara is a play in which the audience follows the actor of their choice, and as you may also know, my husband is 6'5" and hard to miss. I saw him every night in the audience, following me. Every night. And that was the beginning of the greatest love story of my life, still unfolding and getting better by the day.

Sommer died from heart failure at her home in Bel Air, Los Angeles, California, on 28 October 2026, at the age of 85.

== Filmography ==
=== Film ===
Year	Film	Role	Notes
1959	The Friend of the Jaguar	Grete	
1959	Men and Noblemen	Caterina	
1959	Ragazzi del Juke-Box	Giulia Cesari	
1959	The Death Ship	Mylene, ein Französisches Mädchen	
1959	The Day the Rains Came	Ellen	
1959	La Pica sul Pacifico	Rossana	
1960	Stage Fright	Evelyne	
1960	Howlers in the Dock	Giulia Giommarelli	
1960	Heaven, Love and Twine	Eva	
1960	The Warrior Empress		
1960	Femmine di lusso	Greta	
1961	Und sowas nennt sich Leben	Britta	
1961	Daniella by Night	Daniella	
1961	Don't Bother to Knock	Ingrid	
1961	Beloved Impostor	Barbara Shadwell	
1961	Auf Wiedersehen	Suzy Dalton	
1962	Café Oriental	Sylvia	
1962	Douce violence	Elke	
1962	Das Mädchen und der Staatsanwalt	Renate Hecker	
1962	Un chien dans un jeu de quilles	Ariane	
1962	Bahía de Palma	Olga	
1962	The Phone Rings Every Night	Tochter Mabel Meyer	
1963	Les Bricoleurs	Brigitte	
1963	Ostrva	Eva	
1963	The Victors	Helga Metzger	
1963	...denn die Musik und die Liebe in Tirol		
1963	The Prize	Inger Lisa Andersson	
1964	A Shot in the Dark	Maria Gambrelli	
1964	Among Vultures	Annie Dillman	
1965	Le bambole	Ulla	UK title: Four Kinds of Love; segment "Il Trattato di Eugenetica"
1965	Hotel of Dead Guests	Herself	
1965	The Art of Love	Nikki Dunnay	
1965	The Money Trap	Lisa Baron	
1966	The Oscar	Kay Bergdahl	
1966	Boy, Did I Get a Wrong Number!	Didi	
1967	The Venetian Affair	Sandra Fane	
1967	The Peking Medallion	Lilly Mancini	a.k.a. The Corrupt Ones
1967	Deadlier Than the Male	Irma Eckman	
1968	The Wicked Dreams of Paula Schultz	Paula Schultz	
1968	They Came to Rob Las Vegas	Ann Bennett	
1969	The Wrecking Crew	Linka Karensky	
1970	The Invincible Six	Zari	
1971	Percy	Helga	
1971	Zeppelin	Erika Altschul	
1972	Baron Blood	Eva Arnold	
1973	Trip to Vienna	Toni Simon	
1973	Lisa and the Devil	Lisa Reiner / Elena	
1974	One or the Other of Us	Miezi	
1974	Percy's Progress	Clarissa	
1974	Ten Little Indians	Vera Clyde	Also known as And Then There Were None
1975	Carry On Behind	Professor Anna Vooshka	
1975	The Net	Christa Sonntag	
1976	One Away	Elsa	
1976	The Swiss Conspiracy	Rita Jensen	
1976	Meet Him and Die	Perrone's Secretary	
1978	The Astral Factor	Chris Hartman	Re-released as The Invisible Strangler in 1984
1978	I Miss You, Hugs and Kisses	Magdalene Kruschen	Also known as Drop Dead Dearest
1979	The Prisoner of Zenda	The Countess	
1979	The Double McGuffin	Madame Kura	
1979	The Treasure Seekers	Ursula	
1979	A Nightingale Sang in Berkeley Square	Miss Pelham	
1980	Exit Sunset Boulevard	Frau Lachmann	
1981	The Man in Pyjamas	Frau Lachmann	
1984	Lily in Love	Alicia Braun	
1984	No One Cries Forever	Lou Parker	
1987	Death Stone	Kris Patterson	
1988	Himmelsheim	Helga Münzel	
1992	Severed Ties	Helena Harrison	
1996	Life Is a Bluff	Jutta	
1999	Doppeltes Spiel mit Anne	Frau Lorenz	
2000	Flashback	Frau Lust	
2000	The Emperor's New Groove	Yzma	Voice, German dub
2010	Life Is Too Long	Alfi Seliger's mother	
2017	A Thousand Kisses	Nette	Animated short; voice

=== Television ===
Elke Sommer television credits
Year	Title	Role	Notes	Ref.
1972	Probe	Heideline 'Uli' Ullman	TV movie	
1973	The Tonight Show with Johnny Carson	Herself (guest)		
1976	Six Million Dollar Man	Dr Ilse Martin	S4E5	
1979	Stunt Seven	Rebecca Wayne	TV movie	
1979	The Muppet Show	Herself	S3E19	
1980	Top of the Hill	Eva Heggener	TV movie	
1981	Miss Universe Pageant	Herself, co-host	Beauty Pageant	
1982	Inside the Third Reich	Magda Goebbels	TV movie	
1984	The Love Boat	Inga		
1985	Jenny's War	Eva Gruenberg	4 episodes	
1986	The Exciting World of Speed and Beauty	Herself (host)		
1986	Peter the Great	Charlotte	TV miniseries	
1986	St. Elsewhere	Natasha	1 episode	
1986	Anastasia: The Mystery of Anna	Isabel Von Hohenstauffen	TV movie	
1988	Adventures Beyond Belief	Headmistress Bruno von Kleff	5 episodes	
1992	Counterstrike	Anita Duvalier	Episode: "No Honour Among Thieves"	
1993	Happy Holiday	Isabella Scattini	1 episode	
1993	Destiny Ridge	Anna		
1994	Florian III	Sonja Carpenter		
1999	Gisbert	Unknown	1 episode	
2000	Nicht mit uns	Andrea Paretti	TV movie	
2005	Reblaus	Maria Rüppel	TV movie	
2005	Ewig rauschen die Gelder	Frau von Korff	TV movie	
