= Inner City (1995 film) =

- Film poster
- État des lieux
- Directed by: Jean-François Richet
- Written by: Patrick Dell'Isola; Jean-François Richet
- Starring: Cyrille Autin
- Cinematography: Michel Abramowicz; Pierre Boffety; Valérie Le Gurun
- Edited by: Jean-François Richet; Catherine Zins
- Production companies: Actes et Octobre Production; La Sept Cinéma
- Distributed by: MKL Distribution
- Release date: June 14, 1995
- Running time: 80 minutes
- Country: France
- Language: French
- Budget: $300,000
- Box office: $380,000

Inner City (French: État des lieux) is a 1995 film directed by Jean-François Richet. It stars Cyrille Autin and Emmanuelle Bercot. It won an award at the 1995 Avignon Film Festival.

== Cast ==
- Cyrille Autin as Samurai
- Emmanuelle Bercot as Gary Ainsworth
- Anne-Cécile Crapie as Deborah
- Andrée Damant as The mother
- Marc de Jonge as The attacker
- Denis Podalydès as Human Resources director
