= Max Pécas =

French screenwriter, producer and director

Max Pécas (25 April 1925 in Lyon – 10 February 2003 in Paris) was a French filmmaker, writer and producer.

Pécas was assistant director to Jacques Daroy and others from 1948 to 1957. After making erotic movies and thrillers through the 1960s and 1970s, he shot several teen comedies, including the popular three-film "Saint-Tropez" series. Many of his films are considered camp B-movies.

Some of Pécas's softcore films were imported to the U.S. by Radley Metzger.

== Filmography ==
=== Director ===
- 1960 : Le Cercle vicieux with Claude Titre, Louisa Colpeyn
- 1961 : De quoi tu te mêles Daniela? (Daniella by Night) with Elke Sommer, Ivan Desny
- 1962 : Douce violence with Elke Sommer, Pierre Brice
- 1962 : Une femme aux abois with Claude Cerval, Sylvie Coste
- 1963 : Cinq filles en furie with Colette Régis
- 1964 : La Baie du désir (Erotic Touch) with Fabienne Dali, Sophie Hardy
- 1965 : Espions à l'affût with Jean Vinci, Claudine Coster, Robert Lombard
- 1966 : La peur et l'amour with Claude Cerval, Véra Valmont
- 1968 : La Violence et l'amour
- 1968 : La Nuit la plus chaude (The Night of the Outrages) with Philippe Lemaire
- 1968 : The Black Hand with James Harris, Janine Reynaud, Jean Topart
- 1970 : Claude et Greta (Any Time Anywhere / Her and She and Him) with Nicole Debonne, Astrid Frank
- 1971 : Je suis une nymphomane (I Am a Nymphomanic / Young Casanova / The Sensuous Teenager) with Sandra Julien
- 1973 : Je suis frigide... pourquoi ? (I Am Frigid... Why? / Let Me Love You) with Sandra Julien, Marie-Georges Pascal
- 1974 : Club privé pour couples avertis with Philippe Gasté, Anne Libert
- 1974 : Sexuellement vôtre (Sexually Yours / Young Casanova) with Valérie Boisgel, Henri Genès
- 1975 : Rêves pornos (archive footage)
- 1975 : Les Mille et une perversions de Felicia (1001 Perversions of Felicia) with Rebecca Brooke, Béatrice Harnois
- 1976 : Luxure (Everybodys / Sweet Taste of Honey) with Karine Gambier
- 1977 : Marche pas sur mes lacets with Sylvain Chamarande, Vanessa Vaylord
- 1978 : Embraye bidasse, ça fume with Sylvain Chamarande, Michel Vocoret
- 1979 : On est venu là pour s'éclater with Sylvain Chamarande, Olivia Dutron
- 1980 : Mieux vaut être riche et bien portant que fauché et mal foutu with Sylvain Chamarande, Victoria Abril
- 1981 : Belles, blondes et bronzées with Xavier Deluc, Ticky Holgado
- 1982 : On n'est pas sorti de l'auberge with Bernadette Lafont, Jean Lefebvre
- 1983 : Les Branchés à Saint-Tropez with Xavier Deluc, Ticky Holgado, Olivia Dutron
- 1985 : Brigade des mœurs with Pascale Roberts, Christian Barbier
- 1986 : Deux enfoirés à Saint-Tropez with Philippe Caroit, Caroline Tresca
- 1987 : On se calme et on boit frais à Saint-Tropez with Luq Hamet, Brigitte Lahaie

=== Screenwriter ===
- La peur et l'amour (1966)
- Belles, blondes et bronzées (1981)
- Les Branchés à Saint-Tropez (1983)
- Brigade des mœurs (1985)
- Deux enfoirés à Saint-Tropez (1986)
- On se calme et on boit frais à Saint-Tropez (1987)

=== Producer ===
- Brigade des mœurs (1985)
- Deux enfoirés à Saint-Tropez (1986)
- On se calme et on boit frais à Saint-Tropez (1987)
