= Deux enfoirés à Saint-Tropez =

Deux enfoirés à Saint-Tropez (Two bastards in Saint- Tropez) (1986) is a French B movie by Max Pécas.

It is the second film of his "Saint-Tropez" trilogy. It is the last success of Max Pécas (the last one being a failure).
