= Burt Styler =

American film producer (1925–2011)

- Born: February 20, 1925; New York City, New York, U.S.
- Died: June 13, 2011 (aged 86); Tarzana, California, U.S.
- Occupation: TV/Film screenwriter/producer
- Years active: 1949–1989

Burt Malcolm Styler (February 20, 1925 – June 13, 2011) was an American television and film screenwriter and producer. His film credits include Bob Hope comedy Boy, Did I Get a Wrong Number! and such popular TV series as The Life of Riley, My Favorite Martian, Mayberry R.F.D., Gilligan's Island, McHale's Navy, Chico and The Man, M*A*S*H, The Carol Burnett Show, and Too Close For Comfort. He wrote the teleplay/scripts for four of the popular CBS-TV sitcom series All in the Family, for which he won a Primetime Emmy Award in 1972, for writing the episode "Edith's Problem". Styler died of heart failure on June 13, 2011, at the Providence Tarzana Medical Center.
