= The Pianist (1998 film) =

The Pianist (El Pianista)
- Directed by: Mario Gas
- Based on: Novel by Manuel Vázquez Montalbán
- Starring: Serge Reggiani, Laurent Terzieff, Pere Ponce, Jordi Mollà, Pascale Roberts, Michel Robin
- Cinematography: Tomàs Pladevall
- Release date: 1998
- Country: Spain
- Language: Catalan

The Pianist (El Pianista) was a 1998 Catalan-language film directed by Mario Gas, and based on a novel by Manuel Vázquez Montalbán. It tells the story of two musicians, played in their old age by Serge Reggiani and Laurent Terzieff and in their youth by Pere Ponce and Jordi Mollà, who were friends at the onset of the Spanish Civil War. They meet 60 years later, and the movie shows the strikingly different paths which they took in the circumstances of the war.

== Cast ==
- Pascale Roberts as Sra. Amparo
- Michel Robin as Floreal
