= Christian Barbier =

French actor

Christian Barbier (28 June 1924 – 3 November 2009) was a French film and television actor.

Barbier was born at Saint-Ouen, Seine (currently Seine-Saint-Denis), France. During his career (1964 to 1997), he specialized in drama rather than comedy. In film, he held several leading roles but is especially distinguished in auxiliary roles depicting more limited characters. He is especially remembered for his first-class performance in Army of Shadows by Jean-Pierre Melville in 1969. Appearing in a number of soaps and TV shows of the late 1960s to early 1980s, Barbier gained a certain notoriety thanks to the character of Joseph Durtol, bounded and proud hero of The Man of Picardy, the legendary French television series. He died in Manosque (Alpes de Haute-Provence), aged 85.

== Filmography ==
=== Films ===
- 1956: Alerte au deuxième bureau (Jean Stelli) - Le professeur Verdier
- 1964: Lucky Jo (Michel Deville) - Le commissaire Odile
- 1964: Weekend at Dunkirk (Henri Verneuil) - Paul
- 1964: Marie Soleil (Antoine Bourseiller) - Le directeur de l'exploitation agricole
- 1965: La Vie de château (Jean-Paul Rappeneau) - French Colonel (uncredited)
- 1966: Maigret à Pigalle (Mario Landi) - Torrence
- 1966: Trans-Europ-Express (Alain Robbe-Grillet) - Lorentz
- 1966: L'Homme qui osa (The Man Who Dared) (Jean Delire)
- 1967: La Loi du survivant (Law of Survival) (José Giovanni)
- 1967: Lamiel (Jean Aurel) - Vidocq
- 1967: L'Homme qui valait des milliards (The Man Who Was Worth Millions) (Michel Boisrond) - Carl
- 1968: L'Homme à la Buick (The Man in the Buick) (Gilles Grangier) - Maxime
- 1968: Le Franciscain de Bourges (Claude Autant-Lara) - L'abbé Barret
- 1969: La désirade (Alain Cuniot) - Motorist
- 1969: Army of Shadows (Jean-Pierre Melville) - Guillaume Vermersch (“Le Bison”)
- 1969: L'Hiver (Winter ) (Marcel Hanoun) - Producer
- 1969: Target: Harry (Roger Corman) - Sulley Boulez
- 1970: The Horse (Pierre Granier-Deferre) - Léon
- 1970: Peace in the Fields (Jacques Boigelot) - Stanne Vanasche
- 1970: Les Jambes en l'air (Jean Dewever) - Marcel
- 1972: Les Tueurs fous (The Lonely Killers) (Boris Szulzinger) - Worker
- 1972: La chambre rouge (Jean-Pierre Berckmans) - René Noris
- 1973: The Hostage Gang (Édouard Molinaro) - Brigadier
- 1973: Les Granges brûlées (The Burned Barns) (Jean Chapot) - Gendarme
- 1973: L'Affaire Crazy Capo (Patrick Jamain)
- 1975: Only the Wind Knows the Answer
- 1977: Jambon d'Ardenne (Benoît Lamy) - Entrepreneur
- 1977: L'Homme pressé (Man in a Hurry) (Édouard Molinaro) - Cardiologist
- 1980: Trois hommes à abattre (Three Wanted Men) (Jacques Deray) - Liethard
- 1982: Hiver 60 (Thierry Michel) - André's father
- 1983: Le Voyage d'hiver (Marian Handwerker) - Corbin
- 1984: Julien Fontanes, magistrat (Daniel Moosmann) (TV Series) - Jeff Stenay
- 1985: Brigade des mœurs (Max Pécas) - Robert Capes
- 1986: Suivez mon regard (Jean Curtelin)
- 1988: La Maison assassinée (Georges Lautner) - Brigue
- 1991: L'Année de l'éveil (Gérard Corbiau) - Colonel
- 1993: Mayrig (Henri Verneuil) - Father Pignon
- 1994: Éternelles (Erick Zonca) (Short) - Father
- 1997: The Bet (Didier Bourdon and Bernard Campan)
- 2001: Une belle journée (A Beautiful Day) (Frédérique Dolphyn) (Short) - Jean
- 2002: Les Sabots de Vénus
