= Yannick Andréi =

French film director and screenwriter

Yannick Andréi (18 February 1927 – 28 December 1987) was the alias of French film director and screenwriter Jean Antione Andréi. Andréi was born in Bordeaux, France and died in Neuilly-sur-Seine, France.

== Career ==
Andréi began to work in film in 1953 as an assistant director for Jean-Pierre Melville's film Quand tu liras cette lettre. In 1959 he began to work as a screenwriter on Bonjour la chance the French adaptation of Edgar Neville's La ironía del dinero. Andréi's first film as director and screenwriter was Samedi soir in 1961. During his career he worked most often as a television director. Toward the end of his career he held an acting role in Paris-minuit, a film directed by his son Frédéric Andréi.

== Family ==
Yannick Andréi is the father of actor and director Frédéric Andréi.

== Filmography ==
=== Film ===
- 1953: Quand tu liras cette lettre, assistant director
- 1953: Maternité clandestine, assistant director
- 1953: Mon frangin du Sénégal, assistant director
- 1954: Sur le banc, assistant director
- 1956: Ces sacrées vacances, assistant director
- 1958: Premier mai, assistant director
- 1959: Deux hommes dans Manhattan, assistant director
- 1959: Bonjour la chance (La ironía del dinero), adaptation
- 1961: Samedi soir, (director and screenwriter
- 1975: Au-delà de la peur, director and screenwriter
- 1985: Paris-minuit, actor

=== Television ===
- 1962-1963: L'inspecteur Leclerc enquête (6 episodes)
- 1964: L'Abonné de la ligne U
- 1965: Le Théâtre de la jeunesse (1 episode)
- 1966: Le train bleu s'arrête 13 fois (1 episode)
- 1967: Malican père et fils
- 1967: Le Chevalier Tempête
- 1970: Le Service des affaires classées (9 episodes)
- 1971: La Dame de Monsoreau
- 1971: Donogoo
- 1973: Les Aventures du capitaine Lückner
- 1973: L'Hiver du gentilhomme
- 1974: La Juive du Château-Trompette
- 1977: Allez la rafale!
- 1977: D'Artagnan amoureux
- 1979: La Lumière des justes
- 1981 Blanc, bleu, rouge
- 1981: La Double Vie de Théophraste Longuet
- 1982: Une voix la nuit
- 1983: La Chambre des dames
- 1984: Emmenez-moi au théâtre: Croque Monsieur
- 1985: L'Affaire Caillaux
- 1987: Tailleur pour dames
- 1988: Les Clients, TV Movie
