= On se calme et on boit frais à Saint-Tropez =

- The poster of On se calme et on boit frais à Saint-Tropez
- Directed by: Max Pécas
- Starring: Andrée Damant
- Release date: 1987
- Country: France
- Language: French

On se calme et on boit frais à Saint-Tropez ("Let's calm down and drink fresh in Saint-Tropez") (1987) is the last movie made by French film-maker Max Pécas. It is also the last one of his "Saint-Tropez" trilogy.

== Cast ==
- Andrée Damant as Madame Bardaut
