= CFVO-TV =

Television station in Quebec, Canada (1974–1977)

- Hull, Quebec; Canada
- Channels: Analog: 30 (UHF)

Programming
- Affiliations: TVA

Ownership
- Owner: La Coopérative de Télévision de l'Outaouais

History
- First air date: September 1, 1974
- Last air date: March 30, 1977

Technical information
- ERP: 727 kW
- Transmitter coordinates: 45°30′11″N 75°51′02″W

CFVO-TV (channel 30) was a television station in Hull, Quebec, Canada (now Gatineau). It launched on September 1, 1974, under the ownership of the Coopérative de Télévision de l'Outaouais (Outaouais Television Cooperative, CTVO). The station aired mostly TVA network programming with various local shows; it was the first private French-language TV station in the Ottawa–Hull area and the first cooperatively owned television station in Canada.

Constantly dogged by financial trouble, the station went bankrupt and ceased broadcasting on March 30, 1977. The channel 30 equipment was bought from bankruptcy by Radio-Québec (now Télé-Québec) and used to start CIVO-TV, the network's Outaouais transmitter; the CRTC awarded a new commercial station for the area in 1978, which became CHOT-TV (channel 40).

== Planning and application ==
The time is ripe for a private French-language TV station in this area.

— CRTC chairman Pierre Juneau, July 21, 1972

On July 21, 1972, the Canadian Radio-Television Commission (CRTC) approved the granting of a licence to Global Communications Ltd. for a six-station regional television service in Ontario. That same day, the CRTC invited applications for English-language commercial television stations in Vancouver, Edmonton and Winnipeg and for a French-language commercial station in the Ottawa–Hull area, with a deadline of December 31, 1972. While the English-language outlets in western Canada would be the second private commercial outlet in those areas, there was no existing French-language commercial facility in the National Capital Region.

In late July, the first bid for the French-language station was made by a new group, the Coopérative de Télévision de l'Outaouais (Outaouais Television Cooperative, CTVO), led by Gilles Poulin. That April, a conference in Hull to study French-language media on the Quebec–Ontario border had produced a group tasked with investigating the potential to establish a cooperative media outlet, settling on television. After making its bid, the new cooperative, which set up temporary offices in Hull, sought to raise $1 million by selling $10 shares in what would be the first cooperatively owned television station in Canada; all but one of its members were francophone.

While CTVO raised funds, other potential bidders for the channel began to make themselves known. In September, it was reported that the owner of a Hull construction company had expressed interest. By the time the CRTC slated a public hearing in Ottawa, however, there were three applications for channel 30: CTVO; Corporation Civitas Ltée., a subsidiary of the Radiomutuel network; and Télé-Métropole, owner of CFTM-TV channel 10 in Montreal. The CTVO application specified that the cooperative would be led by a 15-member board of directors. CTVO also divided the Outaouais region into ten zones that would each design and produce programming and promised that 20 percent of its output would be locally produced.

The cooperative made a strong positive impression at the public hearing: many of the more than 150 attendees, including unionist Yvon Charbonneau, wore yellow CTVO stickers, and more than a dozen area organizations made statements in support of the bid. In total, 25 oral and 60 written submissions backed the CTVO proposal. Competing applicant Civitas warned that the funds raised would not be sufficient to buy equipment: its president, Raymond Crepeault, forewarned of "the very serious danger of financial stability" and described the CTVO local programming plan as a "tower of Babel".

== Construction ==
However, the factors that set the CTVO application apart from the other ones carried an extra weight in the Commission's view. These factors coincide with certain basic objectives of broadcasting policy. These objectives must be part of any valid application made to the CRTC. The CTVO group, however, has approached these objectives with energy and enthusiasm that which are exceptional and deserve consideration.

— CRTC decision awarding channel 30 to CTVO

On August 3, 1973, the CRTC selected the CTVO application and approved Canada's first cooperative television venture. In granting the licence, the CRTC stipulated that the CTVO station begin broadcasting by October 1, 1974, and be affiliated with the TVA network; additionally, it required the board of directors to be composed equally of residents of Ontario and Quebec. The cooperative continued to sell shares, boasting that 1974 was "The Year of CTVO" in a newspaper ad. Among those involved in setting up the station was future Quebec Premier Pauline Marois.

Construction activities received a boost in March when the station leased out 16,000 square feet (1,500 m^{2}) in an unprofitable movie theatre on St. Joseph Boulevard—the former Our Lady of the Annunciation church—to serve as studios and offices; the building featured high ceilings and theatre equipment, though CTVO had to spend money to add air conditioning. It had sold $600,000 in shares and planned to seek $400,000 in bank loans as well as $1,400,000 in equipment financing. In April, the CRTC assigned channel 10 on local cable systems for carriage of the new CFVO-TV. The transmitter on the Ryan Tower at Camp Fortune was prepared to broadcast the first UHF television station in the province and for the region, though the studios would not be ready to produce local programs at launch.

== Sign-on and early financial turmoil ==
CFVO-TV signed on September 1, 1974, with a documentary on the events leading up to the creation of channel 30 and a 60-minute musical program produced at TVA in Montreal. By year's end, the station was airing five hours of local programming a week, and on January 1, 1975, it doubled that output level to ten hours. CFVO-TV productions ranged from the local morning show Epice Ca and weekly women's programming to a regular series on the cooperative movement. However, signs of financial trouble soon began to arise. In November, station head Poulin noted that rising costs and interest rates had put a temporary strain on CFVO-TV's budget—less than three months after signing on. Some shareholders worried that, before the expansion of local production, the station was too reliant on TVA programming and not living up to its promise of providing community programming.

The new year of 1975 brought even more internal turmoil to channel 30. That January, the station's news staff was abruptly terminated, resulting in pickets and an appeal to CTVO's shareholders; Poulin said that production of Le Quotidien, CFVO's main newscast, was too expensive and the program allegedly attracted the smallest audience of any on its lineup. This came as CTVO employees were organizing under the aegis of the National Communications Federation trade union; meanwhile, zone councils complained that their projects were not being tended to at the station. By March, channel 30 had accumulated a deficit of $300,000. A Toronto-based investor pulled a $900,000 investment in the wake of the financial troubles at the Global network; a massive fundraising and shareholder drive saved the outlet from bankruptcy or a potential sale. It emerged from this financial crisis having laid off 36 of its 58 employees.

CFVO began 1976 in much the same way it began 1975. On January 6, it announced the lay-off of 12 employees, slashing local output from 16 hours a week to 2 1/2 hours and eliminating all of its local non-information shows. Reports circulated that Télé-Métropole was seeking to buy the station, while employees blamed Poulin and the board of directors for administrative inefficiencies, including significant overexpenditures in the travel and miscellaneous items budget lines. Two days later, Poulin resigned, claiming he was "tired" and in the face of demands by the unionized employees; the board refused to accept his resignation on the grounds that he was needed to negotiate a $300,000 loan for the cooperative. The cuts sparked new concerns that CFVO was becoming a mere repeater of TVA programming supplied by Télé-Metropole. At the station's licence renewal hearing in March, Poulin said that CTVO needed to raise $50,000 to survive; the CRTC worried that the group would sacrifice cooperative status in pursuit of financial stability.

== Cinérotique controversy ==
The 1976 licence renewal cycle put another aspect of CFVO programming under the spotlight: its airing of Cinérotique, a late-night showcase of erotic films, on Friday nights. The program had launched with the station in September 1974, and it was one of the station's most successful, attracting as much as half the Ottawa viewing audience in its time slot. During a hearing, CRTC member Jacques Hébert said that CFVO-TV was the only station in Canada—and may have been the only in North America—to show such movies. Meanwhile, before the Ontario government—which had set up a royal commission into violence in the media—Poulin admitted that most of the station's programs (though not the erotic films) were not screened before being broadcast. Additionally, CFVO was criticized for airing popular American crime shows, such as Hawaii Five-O and Kojak, that were purchased by Télé-Métropole.

Demands for Cinérotique to be cancelled came from Bishop Adolphe Proulx and from the Caisse Populaire St. Joseph—one of several backers of a new fund drive for the station. The controversy prompted CFVO to stop airing the movies after June 11, 1976. The penultimate showing was preempted when the station rejected a film it found too hardcore for broadcast.

Before the program ended, however, channel 30's broadcasts led to a court case in Ontario. After members of the Ottawa Police Service's morality squad seized films from the station in May, CFVO was charged in June with two counts, of unlawfully publishing and knowingly exposing to public view obscene moving pictures. The station fought the charges, claiming that Ontario police lacked jurisdiction over the Quebec-based outlet.

In September, CFVO pleaded not guilty and stated it would not take any action to restore the program until after the trial, which would not start until January 1977. However, in December, it announced it would start a similar but softer program, Cine-Vendredi (Friday Night Movies), in light of its financial difficulties. The cooperative attempted to have the trial moved to Sudbury, the only bilingual court district in the province of Ontario; when a judge denied that motion, the station refused to mount a defence in an English-language courtroom in Ottawa. In testimony, the distributor of the movies called them "sex films" and said he expected the station to do its own censoring. The court ruled against CFVO-TV and fined it $1,000 at the conclusion of the trial.

== Closure ==
Amidst the Cinérotique court fight, station management continued to be optimistic about CFVO-TV's financial picture, despite being $500,000 in debt. The station had secured a new program exchange agreement to air educational fare from province-owned Radio-Québec, though local programming plans remained slim in light of their associated costs. However, in the second half of 1976, conditions worsened. By year's end, Pierre Thibault of Radio-Nord's CKRN-TV in Rouyn-Noranda had been dispatched to Hull to try to turn around the ailing cooperative station; Poulin had resigned, and the CRTC had suggested that CTVO hire someone from Radio-Nord or Télé-Métropole to assist.

In January, CTVO worked to negotiate loans from credit unions (caisses populaires) in Hull and Montreal. The station had not paid its utility bills, was six months behind on rent, and could not repair any equipment that broke down. While the Union Regionale de Montreal des Caisses Populaires agreed to support the station, it refused to make a financial commitment until it had audited CTVO's books. Interim manager Thibault warned that the station was running out of time as sponsors were afraid to buy advertising time on a station with an uncertain future. A temporary director of shareholder services issued a plan that suggested a return to cooperative ways for CFVO-TV, which had become "a co-operation acting like a corporation".

On February 24, the Union Regionale announced that it would loan CTVO $700,000, on the condition that CFVO reach an agreement with its creditors under which they would receive a portion of the money they were owed. A meeting with creditors was slated for March 29 by the appointed trustee. Even as one lender held out hope, another froze the business out. Banque Canadienne Nationale froze $400,000 in credit on March 10, leaving 50 CFVO-TV employees unpaid; entreaties were made with the provincial government for funding.

At the meeting on March 29, CTVO was unable to convince a majority of the 198 creditors, collectively owed about $2 million, to approve its repayment proposal of 10 cents on the dollar. While talks continued, the station signed off that night with news of its bankruptcy and one last plea for donations. It was not to be. After employees spent much of the day clearing out their personal belongings, CFVO-TV signed off for the final time at 3 p.m. on March 30, airing the same Bonne Nuit (Good Night) slide that it showed at the close of programming each night before fading to black. Fifteen minutes later, Hydro-Québec shut off the electricity to the St. Joseph's Boulevard studios.

The station's employees slammed the Parti Québécois-led provincial government for not doing enough to save CFVO. On March 31, some 20 employees picketed the office of MNA Jocelyne Ouellette in protest. A small group of shareholders mounted a last-ditch effort in late April to revive the station, but the effort failed when the caisses populaires refused to finance it.

== After CFVO-TV ==
On April 5, 1977, Radio-Québec announced that it was submitting to the bankruptcy trustee in Montreal a bid to buy the assets of CFVO-TV in order to expand its broadcast coverage to the Outaouais area. On April 21, it announced that it had purchased the equipment directly from the creditors, bypassing the cooperative; the $545,000 acquisition represented half of the outlay that would have been necessary to commission a transmitter from the ground up. Radio-Québec already had a production crew in the Ottawa area and did not need to hire CFVO's former employees.

News of Radio-Québec's interest came as several groups were also readying plans for a new French-language commercial station in the National Capital Region. While channel 30 was broadcasting, a group of businessmen operating as Innovacom applied to the CRTC for a permit of its own. On June 30, the CRTC revoked CFVO-TV's licence, issued a licence to Radio-Québec to carry on a television station on channel 30 at Hull with the same technical parameters as the defunct CFVO-TV, and announced it would take applications to licence a new TVA affiliate for the region. CIVO-TV began broadcasting on August 15, 1977.

Though as many as four bids were rumoured to be incoming for the TVA affiliate, the CRTC only received two, from Télé-Métropole and Radio-Nord. The CRTC selected the application from Radio-Nord to telecast on channel 40 in December; CHOT-TV began operations on October 27, 1978. Thibault served as its first general manager.

Poulin joined Radio-Nord in 1977 and was promoted to executive vice president in 1980 and president in 1987. He also served on the board of directors of the TVA television network. Poulin left the company in 2001.
