= List of stage names: V =

This list of stage names lists names used by those in the entertainment industry, alphabetically by their stage name's surname (or the best approximation) followed by the given name (or the best approximation) where the surname begins with "V". One-word stage names are presented in List of one-word stage names.

Stage name	Birth name	Life	Notability	Notes
Michael V.	Beethoven Del Valle Bunagan	1969–	Filipino actor, comedian and recording artist	Also known as Bitoy
Roger Vadim	Roger Vadim Plemiannikov	1928–2000	French filmmaker	Sometimes transliterated Plemiannikoff
Dan Vadis	Constantine Daniel Vafiadis	1938–1987	American actor	
Holly Valance	Holly Rachel Vukadinovic	1983–	Australian model, actress and singer	
Sigrid Valdis	Patricia Annette Olson	1935–2007	American actress	
Eric Vale	Christopher Eric Johnson	1974–	American voice actor	
Jerry Vale	Gennaro Louis Vitaliano	1930–2014	American singer and actor	
Ritchie Valens	Richard Steven Valenzuela	1941–1959	American musician	
Brooke Valentine	Kanesha Nichole Brookes	1984–	American singer, actress and model	
Dickie Valentine	Richard Maxwell	1929–1971	English pop singer	Also known as Richard Bryce
Gary Valentine	Gary Joseph Lachman	1955–	American writer and musician	
Stacy Valentine	Stacy Baker	1970–	American former pornographic actress	
Val Valentino	Leonard Montano	1956–	American magician	
Laura Valenzuela	Rocío Espinosa López-Cepero	1931–2023	Spanish television presenter, actress and model	
Dana Valery	Fausta Dana Galli	1944–	Italian-South African singer and actress	
Valda Valkyrien	Adele Freed	1895–1956	Danish actress	
Jean Vallée	Paul Goeders	1941–2014	Belgian singer-songwriter	
Alida Valli	Alida von Altenburger	1921–2006	Italian actress	
Frankie Valli	Francesco Stephen Castelluccio	1934–	American singer (The Four Seasons)	
Valli Valli	Valli Knust	1882–1927	German actress	
Virginia Valli	Virginia McSweeney	1895–1968	American actress	
Hélène Vallier	Militza de Poliakoff-Baïdaroff	1932–1988	French actress	
Billy Van	William Van Evera	1934–2003	Canadian comedian, actor and singer	
Bobby Van	Robert Stein	1928–1980	American singer and actor	
Irene Vanbrugh	Irene Barnes	1872–1949	English actress	
Violet Vanbrugh	Violet Barnes	1867–1942	English actress	
Tommy Vance	Richard Hope-Weston	1940–2005	English radio broadcaster	
Vivian Vance	Vivian Jones	1909–1979	American actress and singer	
Edmond Van Daële	Edmond Minckwitz	1884–1960	Dutch-French actor	
Jean-Claude Van Damme	Jean-Claude Van Varenberg	1960–	Belgian martial artist, actor and filmmaker	
Musetta Vander	Musetta van der Merwe	1963–	South African actress, model and dancer	
Warren Vanders	Warren Vanderschuit	1930–2009	American actor	
Trish Van Devere	Patricia Dressel	1941–	American retired actress	
Despina Vandi	Despina Malea	1969–	Greek singer	
Mamie Van Doren	Joan Olander	1931–	American actress	
John van Dreelen	Jacques van Drielen Gimberg	1922–1992	Dutch actor	
André van Duin	Adrianus Marinus Kloot	1947–	Dutch comedian, singer-songwriter and television presenter	
Ricki Van Dusen	Mildred Kornman	1925–2022	American actress and model	
Paul van Dyk	Matthias Paul	1971–	German DJ, record producer and musician	
Les Vandyke	John Worsley	1931–2021	English songwriter	
Daniel Vangarde	Daniel Bangalter	1947–	French songwriter and producer	
Jimmy Van Heusen	Edward Babcock	1913–1990	American composer	
David Vanian	David Lett	1956–	English musician and singer (The Damned)	
Cherry Vanilla	Kathleen Dorritie	1943–	American singer-songwriter	
David VanLanding	William David VanLandingham	1964–2015	American singer	
Tzeni Vanou	Eugenia Vrachnou	1939–2014	Greek singer	
Philip Van Zandt	Philip Pinheiro	1904–1958	Dutch-American actor	
Norma Varden	Norma Varden Shackleton	1898–1989	English-American actress	
Rosy Varte	Nevarte Manouelian	1923–2012	French actress	
Frankie Vaughan	Frank Abelson	1928–1999	English singer and actor	
Peter Vaughan	Peter Ohm	1923–2016	English actor	
Jean Vautrin	Jean Herman	1933–2015	French writer and filmmaker	
Bobby Vee	Robert Velline	1943–2016	American singer	
Alan Vega	Boruch Bermowitz	1938–2016	American singer (Suicide)	
Julie Vega	Julie Apostol	1968–1985	Filipina actress and singer	
Paz Vega	María de la Paz Campos Trigo	1976–	Spanish actress	
Johnny Vegas	Michael Pennington	1970–	English comedian and actor	
José Vélez	José Velázquez Jiménez	1951–	Spanish singer	
Vinny Vella	Vincent Vellacerra	1947–2019	American actor	
Suthi Velu	Kurumaddali Rao	1947–2012	Indian actor and comedian	
Amy Veness	Amy Beart	1876–1960	English actress	
Nick Venet	Nikolas Venetoulis	1936–1998	American record producer	
Zacky Vengeance	Zachary Baker	1981–	American musician (Avenged Sevenfold)	
Lee Venora	Elena Sinaguglia	1932–	American opera singer and actress	
Richard Venture	Richard Venturella	1923–2017	American actor	
Benay Venuta	Benvenuta Crooke	1910–1995	American actress, singer and dancer	
Billy Vera	William McCord	1944–	American singer, songwriter and actor	
Violette Verdy	Nelly Guillerm	1933–2016	French ballerina and choreographer	
Ben Vereen	Benjamin Middleton	1946–	American actor, dancer and singer	
Tom Verlaine	Thomas Miller	1949–2023	American singer and musician (Television)	
Kaaren Verne	Ingeborg Klinckerfuss	1918–1967	German-American actress	
Anne Vernon	Édith Vignaud	1924–	French retired actress	
Dai Vernon	David Verner	1894–1992	Canadian magician	
Howard Vernon	John Lett	1848–1921	Australian actor	
Howard Vernon	Mario Lippert	1908–1996	Swiss actor	
Irene Vernon	Irene Vergauwen	1922–1998	American actress	
Jackie Vernon	Ralph Verrone	1924–1987	American stand-up comedian and actor	
John Vernon	Adolphus Raymondus Vernon Agopsowicz	1932–2005	Canadian actor	
Odile Versois	Étiennette de Poliakoff-Baydaroff	1930–1980	French actress	
Edy Vessel	Edoarda Vesselovsky	1940–	Italian actress	
El Vez	Robert Lopez	1960–	American singer-songwriter and musician	
Sid Vicious	John Ritchie	1957–1979	English musician (Sex Pistols)	
Martha Vickers	Martha MacVicar	1925–1971	American actress	
Yvette Vickers	Iola Yvette Vedder	1928–2010	American actress, model and singer	
Lucha Villa	Luz Ruiz-Bejarano	1936–	Mexican singer and actress	
Violetta Villas	Czesława Cieślak	1938–2011	Polish actress	
Aspen Vincent	Aspen Miller	1979–	American actress and singer	
E. Duke Vincent	Edward Ventimiglia	1932–2024	American television producer and writer	
Gene Vincent	Vincent Eugene Craddock	1935–1971	American musician and singer	
June Vincent	Dorothy June Smith	1920–2008	American actress	
Leslie Vincent	Leslie Fullard-Leo	1909–2001	American actor	
Tony Vincent	Anthony Strascina	1973–	American actor, songwriter and singer	
Vinnie Vincent	Vincent Cusano	1952–	American musician (Kiss)	
Lee Ving	Lee Capellaro	1950–	American musician (Fear)	
Helen Vinson	Helen Rulfs	1907–1999	American actress	
Ultra Violet	Isabelle Dufresne	1935–2014	French-American artist	
Helle Virkner	Helle Lotinga	1925–2009	Danish actress	
Yolandi Visser	Anri Du Toit	1984–	South African rapper (Die Antwoord)	
Monica Vitti	Maria Ceciarelli	1931–2022	Italian actress	
John Vivyan	John Vukayan	1915–1983	American actor	
Marina Vlady	Marina de Poliakoff-Baydaroff	1938–	French actress	
Angelina Jolie	Angelina Jolie Voight	1975–	American actress	
Julio Voltio	Julio Ramos	1977–	Puerto Rican singer	
Kat Von D	Katherine von Drachenberg	1982–	American tattoo artist and television personality	
Patricia Vonne	Patricia Rodriguez	1969–	American singer and actress	
Rosa von Praunheim	Holger Radtke	1942–2025	German film director, author and activist	
Dita Von Teese	Heather Sweet	1972–	American dancer and model	
ICS Vortex	Simen Hestnæs	1974–	Norwegian musician (Arcturus)	Also known as Vortex
