= Cemetery Without Crosses =

1968 film directed by Robert Hossein

- French film poster
- Directed by: Robert Hossein
- Screenplay by: Robert Hossein; Claude Desailly
- Produced by: Jean-Pierre Labatut; Jean-Charles Raffini
- Starring: Michèle Mercier; Robert Hossein; Lee Burton; Daniel Vargas; Michel Lemoine; Anne-Marie Balin
- Cinematography: Henri Persin
- Edited by: Marie-Sophie Dubus
- Music by: André Hossein
- Production companies: Loisirs Du Monde; Copernicus Films; Fono Roma
- Distributed by: Les Films Fernand Rivers (France); Euro International Film (Italy)
- Release date: 25 January 1969 (France)
- Running time: 90 minutes
- Countries: France; Italy
- Language: French
- Box office: 923,772 admissions (France)

Cemetery Without Crosses (French: Une corde, un Colt..., Italian: Cimitero senza croci), is a 1969 Western film by Robert Hossein, its director, co-screenwriter and star. It is a French and Italian co-production and stars Michèle Mercier as Maria Caine and Hossein as Manuel. In the film, Caine's husband is murdered by bandits. She seeks revenge through her old friend Manuel, who is initially reluctant, but then goes after the widow's killers.

The film was shot in the Almería desert in early 1968. On its release author Raymond Chirat said that Cemetery Without Crosses divided French critics with some reviews saying it borrowed too much from Italian spaghetti westerns and others finding it satisfying, and critic Henry Chapier saying it found Hossein delving into "his genuine strength and his love for frenzy and the baroque." It has received positive retrospective reviews in Film Comment and Sight & Sound.

== Plot ==
Will Rogers, the patriarch of a wealthy cattle ranching family, forces the sheep farming Caine brothers — Ben, Thomas, and Eli — to sell off their livestock. In retaliation, the Caines steal a shipment of gold coins intended for the Rogers; during their escape, Ben is wounded. Thomas and Eli ride to their ranch, while Ben, upon returning to his home, is ambushed by the Rogers and lynched as his wife, Maria, is forced by Will's sons to watch. The Rogers then ride to Thomas and Eli's ranch and burn down their house. The brothers ride to Maria's home to find her burying her husband, and give her a third-share of the stolen money.

Driven by revenge, Maria take the money to a ghost town surrounded by dunes, where she meets its lone inhabitant, Manuel. A gunfighter with a fetishistic habit of wearing a black leather glove in duels, Manuel had once shared a romantic relationship with Maria and a friendship with Ben, but he left the pair to marry in order to suppress his violent nature. Maria asks him to avenge Ben on her behalf — although reluctant and skeptical, Manuel accepts her offer.

Manuel rides to a nearby town and stays at a hotel that Will's sons frequent. In the saloon, vigilantes from the rival Vallee family confront and attack the Rogers brothers in an attempt to run them out of town; Manuel kills the Vallees, and is quickly arrested. The next morning, the Rogers brothers bribe the sheriff into releasing Manuel, and take him to the family ranch. Thankful for saving his sons, Will provides Manuel a job as the ranch's foreman. That night, Manuel dines with the Rogers and their ranch hands, during which he opens a jar of mustard to find a jack-in-the-box, resulting in both dinner tables erupting with laughter as they accept him as their friend.

Later, Manuel opens the ranch's corral and frees the horses; during the commotion as the Rogers try to pursue their mounts, he kidnaps Diana, Will's teenage daughter, and takes her to the ghost town. Thomas and Eli rape Diana, while Maria and Manuel, growing increasingly impassioned and uncomfortable with the situation that is transpiring, wait outside in the street. Maria rides to the Rogers ranch and demands that they re-bury Ben in the town cemetery in exchange for Diana's life. They begrudgingly accept, and provide Ben with a sizeable funeral procession and burial. Thomas and Eli, fearing that Maria's revenge scheme will result in disaster, attempt to convince Manuel to surrender Diana to them, but they are forced to leave when he threatens to kill them.

The Rogers capture the Caine brothers; in exchange for $2000, Thomas offers to return Diana to her family that night. His attempt to surprise Maria and Manuel fails, and they shoot him. Thomas' horse carrys his dead body to the rendezvous point, where Eli confesses that Diana is in the ghost town. Upon learning this, Will has him dragged to death by a horse. Maria and Manuel meanwhile leave the ghost town; Manuel takes Diana back to her family's ranch, while Maria returns to her home to wait for Manuel so that they can travel north and escape. However, the Rogers, believing that she and Manuel have killed Diana, are waiting for her. Manuel finds Maria mortally wounded; admitting that she had married Ben out of fear of not seeing Manuel again, she dies in his arms.

Manuel rides to the ghost town to see the Rogers waiting for him on one side of the street, and he guns them down in quick succession. Diana, on horseback and armed with a rifle, witnesses the duel. Manuel removes his "killing glove", disarms himself and confronts Diana, who shoots him and rides away as he collapses onto the sand and dies.

== Cast ==
- Michèle Mercier as Maria Caine
- Robert Hossein as Manuel
- Guido Lollobrigida (as Lee Burton) as Thomas Caine
- Daniele Vargas (as Daniel Vargas) as Will Rogers
- Michel Lemoine as Eli Caine
- Anne-Marie Balin as Johanna Rogers (Diana Rogers in English)
- Serge Marquand as Larry Rogers
- Pierre Hatet as Frank Rogers
- Philippe Baronnet as Bud Rogers
- Pierre Collet as Sheriff Ben
- Ivano Staccioli as Vallee Brother
- Béatrice Altariba as Saloon Woman
- Benito Stefanelli as Ben Caine (uncredited)
- Cris Huerta as Hotelier (uncredited)
- Ángel Álvarez as Bartender (uncredited)

== Production ==
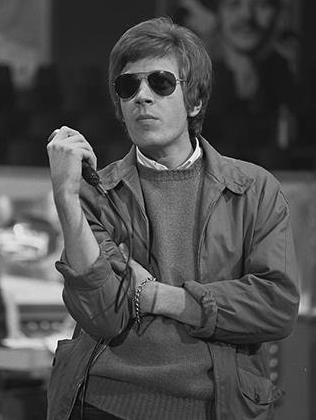
Scott Walker in 1968. Cemetery Without Crosses' title theme was sung by Walker and written by Hal Shaper.

Cemetery Without Crosses was Robert Hossein's second Western he directed after Le Goût de la violence (1961). The film was shot in the Almería desert in early 1968. Dario Argento is credited as co-screenwriter in the film, while Hossein insists Argento had nothing to do with it.

Also being filmed in the desert at the same time as Shalako (1968). While filming, Hossein had it so character portraying native Americans would attack when commanded to by radio. To his surprise, the characters from Shalako attacked due to crossed-lines with the radio. This led to losing a day of filming. Hossein said he enjoyed filming in the Almeria desert, despite what he described as a lack of resources. Hossein dedicated his film to director Sergio Leone, who did uncredited direction on a dinner scene where the Rogers family play a practical joke on Manuel.

The score was composed by the director's father, André Hossein, while the theme song "The Rope and the Colt" is sung by Scott Walker and released as a single in France.

== Release ==
Cemetery Without Crosses was first released in France on January 25, 1969. It drew fewer than a million spectators in France over the year, with 923,772 total. Hossein lamented that the events of May 68 in France consumed the French public and press saying that "it didn't even have the chance to be a success or not" due to social climate and strikes at the time. It was shown in Quebec at the Festival de cinéma français which ran September 26 from October 2, 1969.

The film was released by Arrow Video in the United Kingdom and United States on Blu-Ray and DVD on July 20, 2015.

== Reception ==
In Bianco e Nero, author Raymond Chirat said that Cemetery Without Crosses divided French critics. Michel Aubriant of Le Journal du Dimanche found the film borrowed from the themes of the spaghetti western but that Hossein lacks the presence of actor like Clint Eastwood. Le Canard enchaîné echoed this saying that the films draws a bit too much inspiration from the Italian Westerns, and being shot in Spain, it feels we have difficulty discovering America in this film. Alternatively, Louis Chauvet of Le Figaro, Tristan Renaud of Les Lettres Françaises, and Gilbert Picard of Paris Jour found the film satisfying. Henry Chapier wrote in Combat that the film was "far from spaghetti westerns and Sergio Leone's arrogance" and that Hossein had "passed the risky test at first glance, pouring into all the generosity of his temperament, his genuine strength and his love for frenzy and the baroque." Gene Moskowitz, the longtime Paris correspondent and film critic for Variety, wrote that the film did not work as it too slow-paced. He commented that Hossein played the role in a "Robot-like fashion" and that Michele Mercier was "too made up" and lacked the projection and depth to make her vengeful widow acceptable.

From retrospective reviews, Alex Cox discussed the film in Film Comment, stating that the film "holds its own against art westerns like Once Upon a Time in the West and El Topo" specifically noting Henri Persin's cinematography and Jean Mandaroux's production design. James Blackford discussed the release in Sight & Sound, stating that where "Leone exaggerated the western's traits with virtuoso style and grandiouse mise en scene, Hossein's approach is more to distill the genre." Blackford compared the film to the work of Jean-Pierre Melville, noting the film was "marked by long periods without dialogue and an intense focus on essential images. In this filmic space, every pronounced camera movement, musical cue and look exchanged by the characters heightens the melodrama. The result is a compellingly pure take on the western, true to the tradition of French popular cinema."

== Notes ==
=== References ===
- "Une corde, un Colt [Cimitero senza croci] (1969)" [A Rope, a Colt [A Cemetery Without Crosses]] (in Italian). Rome, Italy: ANICA. Archived from the original on September 21, 2019.
- "Credits". Cemetery Without Crosses (Booklet). Arrow Films. 2015. FCD1121.
- "Cemetery Without Crosses". Arrow Video. Archived from the original on April 5, 2015.
- "Une corde, un colt" (in French). Bifi.fr. Archived from the original on December 10, 2006.
- "Festival de cinéma français" [French Film Festival]. Le Devoir (in French). Montreal, Quebec. September 11, 1969 – via Newspapers.com.
- "Gene Moskowitz Dead; Variety Film Critic, 61". The New York Times. The New York Times Company. December 31, 1982. ISSN 0362-4331. Archived from the original on February 4, 2012.
- Blackford, James (September 2015). "New Releases". Sight & Sound. Vol. 25, no. 9. United Kingdom: British Film Institute. ISSN 0037-4806.
- Chirat, Raymond (July–September 1997). "Il western francese paria" [The French Western Speaks]. Bianco e Nero (in Italian). Vol. LVII, no. 3. Centro Sperimentale di Cinematografia. ISBN 88-8033-100-0.
- Cox, Alex (2008). "Allez Ouest!" [Go West!]. Film Comment. Vol. 44, no. 6. Film Society of Lincoln Center. ISSN 0015-119X.
- Cox, Alex (2009). 10,000 Ways to Die: A Director's Take on the Spaghetti Western. Oldcastle Books. ISBN 978-1842433041.
- Forest, Claude (2024). Andree Davanture, La passion du montage (in French). Paris, France: L'Harmattan. ISBN 978-2-343-23388-8.
- Hossein, Robert (2001). La Nostalgie [Nostalgia] (in French). Paris: Michel Lafon Publishing. ISBN 2-253-15323-0.
- Hughes, Howard (2010). Spaghetti Westerns. Oldcastle Books. ISBN 978-1842433959.
- Lund, Carson (July 22, 2015). "Review: Robert Hossein's Cemetery Without Crosses on Arrow Blu-ray". Slant Magazine. Brooklyn, New York: Slant Magazine LLC. Archived from the original on July 21, 2019.
- Moskowitz, Gene (1983). "April 2 (Cont.)". Variety Film Reviews 1968-1970. Vol. 12. Gardland Publishing, Inc. ISBN 0-8240-5211-0.
- Reynolds, Anthony (2009). The Impossible Dream: The Story of Scott Walker and the Walker Brothers. Jawbone Publishing Corp. ISBN 978-1906002251.
- Scheie, Timothy (January 2024). French Westerns. Edinburgh, United Kingdom: Edinburgh University Press. ISBN 978-1-3995-2037-9.
- Weisser, Thomas (2005). Spaghetti Westerns--the Good, the Bad and the Violent: A Comprehensive, Illustrated Filmography of 558 Eurowesterns and Their Personnel, 1961-1977. Jefferson, North Carolina: McFarland & Company. ISBN 0786424427.
