= Double Agents (film) =

1959 mystery film

- Directed by: Robert Hossein
- Screenplay by: Robert Hossein; Louis Martin; Alain Poiré
- Produced by: Alain Poiré
- Starring: Marina Vlady; Robert Hossein
- Cinematography: Jacques Robin
- Edited by: Gilbert Natot
- Music by: André Hossein
- Release date: 1959
- Language: French

Double Agents (French: La nuit des espions, Italian: La notte delle spie), also known as Night Encounter, is a 1959 mystery film co-written and directed by Robert Hossein.

A French-Italian co-production, it is based on the novel La Nuit des espions by Robert Chazal. It entered the main competition at the 20th edition of the Venice Film Festival.

== Cast ==
- Marina Vlady as Helen Gordon
- Robert Hossein as Philip Davis
- Michel Etcheverry as German Officer
- Robert Le Béal as British Colonel
- Michèle Dufour as Elga Kiel
- Roger Crouzet as Lt. Lindorff
- Clément Harari as Hans
- Georges Vitaly as Radio Announcer

== Reception ==
Michèle Manceaux from L'Express described the film as "a Pirandellian idea [...] tinged with existentialism, and all drowned in an incredibly naive pathos, full of the [naive] humanism of a first communicant, with a lyricism that borders on bad taste".

Jean-Louis Tallenay from Signes Du Temps wrote: "two fascinating faces, an original subject, a skillfully created atmosphere. But a confusion of ideas, an uncertainty in the direction of the actors and an affectation in the framing explain the rather cold reception given to the film".

Bianco e Nero's film critic Giulio Cesare Castello wrote: "On one hand, it seems like a story in the style of Hitchcock, poised between emotion and deception; yet it lacks Hitchcock's skill in construction and his talent for thematic variations. On the other hand, one gets the impression that Hossein aimed much higher — for an "absolute", passionate love story set under exceptional circumstances", noting that "Hossein would certainly have liked to create his own Hiroshima mon amour. But [...] the "necessity" of inspiration — the purity of the poetic condition — is entirely absent here".
