= Les Scélérats =

- Original film poster
- Directed by: Robert Hossein
- Written by: Frédéric Dard; Robert Hossein (adaptation)
- Starring: Michèle Morgan; Robert Hossein; Olivier Hussenot; Jacqueline Morane
- Cinematography: Jacques Robin
- Edited by: Louisette Hautecoeur
- Music by: André Hossein
- Production companies: Les Films Marceau-Cocinor; Les Productions Francis Lopez
- Distributed by: Cocinor
- Release date: 9 May 1960
- Running time: 90 minutes
- Country: France
- Language: French

Les Scélérats (English title: The Wretches) is a 1960 French drama film directed by Robert Hossein who co-stars with Michèle Morgan, Olivier Hussenot and Jacqueline Morane. It is also known as "The Blackguards". It is based on the novel Les Scélérats by Frédéric Dard.

== Plot ==
The film tells the story of an American couple (coming to in Paris after having lost their only child) and their maid.

== Principal cast ==
- Michèle Morgan as Thelma Rooland
- Robert Hossein as Jess Rooland
- Olivier Hussenot as Arthur Martin
- Jacqueline Morane as Adeline Martin
