= The Blue Veil (1942 film) =

1942 French drama film by Jean Stelli

- Directed by: Jean Stelli
- Written by: François Campaux
- Produced by: Raymond Artus
- Starring: Gaby Morlay; Elvire Popesco; André Alerme; Fernand Charpin
- Cinematography: René Gaveau; Marcel Grignon
- Edited by: Michelle David
- Music by: Alfred Desenclos; André Theurer
- Production company: Compagnie Générale Cinématographique
- Distributed by: Consortium du Film
- Release date: 18 November 1942
- Running time: 112 minutes
- Country: France
- Language: French

The Blue Veil (French: Le voile bleu) is a 1942 French drama film directed by Jean Stelli and starring Gaby Morlay, Elvire Popesco and André Alerme. The film was remade in 1951.

== Cast ==
- Gaby Morlay as Louise Jarraud
- Elvire Popesco as Mona Lorenza
- André Alerme as Ernest Volnar-Bussel
- Fernand Charpin as Émile Perrette
- Aimé Clariond as Le juge d'instruction
- Pierre Larquey as Antoine Lancelot
- Marcelle Géniat as Madame Breuilly
- Georges Grey as Gérard Volnar-Bussel
- Jeanne Fusier-Gir as Mademoiselle Eugénie
- Renée Devillers as Madame Forneret
- Denise Grey as Madame Volnar-Bussel
- Francine Bessy as La jeune danseuse
- Jean Clarieux as Henri Forneret
- Pierre Jourdan as Dominique
- Camille Bert as Le médecin
- Noël Roquevert as L'inspecteur Duval
- Marcel Vallée as L'imprésario de Mona Lorenza
- Jean Bobillot as Julien
- Mona Dol as L'infirmière-chef
- Camille Guérini as d'Aubigny
- Marthe Mellot as Une commère
- Primerose Perret as Georgette Volnar-Bucel
- Michel de Bonnay as Pierre Breuilly
- Monique Bourdette as Une petite fille
- Pierre Brulé as Un petit garçon
- Jean Fay as L'imprésario étranger
- Raymonde La Fontan as Lotte Lorenza
- Odette Barencey as Une commère
- Paul Barge]
- Liliane Bert
- Paul Demange as Pons
- Michel François
- Marcelle Monthil as Une commère
- Noëlle Norman as Madame Berger, la directrice du bureau de placement
- Jacques Ory as Un jeune garçon
- Julienne Paroli as La concierge

== Bibliography ==
- Dayna Oscherwitz & MaryEllen Higgins. The A to Z of French Cinema. Scarecrow Press, 2009.
