= Toi, le venin =

1959 film

- Theatrical poster
- Directed by: Robert Hossein
- Written by: Robert Hossein; Frédéric Dard (novel)
- Produced by: Jules Borkon
- Starring: Robert Hossein; Marina Vlady; Odile Versois
- Cinematography: Robert Juillard
- Edited by: Gilbert Natot
- Music by: André Hossein
- Production companies: Champs-Élysées Productions; Filmauro
- Distributed by: Pathé Consortium Cinéma
- Release date: 27 March 1959
- Running time: 92 minutes
- Countries: France; Italy
- Language: French

Toi, le venin (aka: Blonde in a White Car; US title: Nude in a White Car; UK title: Night Is Not for Sleep) is a 1959 French mystery film directed and written by Robert Hossein, based on the novel C'est toi le venin... by Frédéric Dard. The music score was by André Hossein. The film tells the story of a young man who has affairs with two sisters.

== Cast ==
- Robert Hossein as Pierre Menda
- Marina Vlady as Eva Lecain
- Odile Versois as Hélène Lecain
- Héléna Manson as Amélie
- Henri Arius as Titin (as Arius)
- Bréols as Himself
- Charles Blavette as L'inspecteur de police (as Blavette)
- Isola Blondie as Himself
- Lucien Callamand as Julien - le jardinie
- Paul Coppel as Himself
- Pascal Mazzotti as L'homme de la discothèque
- Henri Crémieux as Le docteur
