= Night Round =

- Directed by: François Campaux
- Written by: François Campaux; Claude Accursi
- Produced by: Raymond Artus
- Starring: Tilda Thamar; Julien Carette; Noël Roquevert
- Cinematography: René Gaveau
- Edited by: Michelle David
- Music by: André Theurer
- Production company: Compagnie Générale Cinématographique
- Distributed by: Gaumont Distribution
- Release date: 9 September 1949
- Running time: 92 minutes
- Country: France
- Language: French

Night Round (French: Ronde de nuit) is a 1949 French crime film directed by François Campaux and starring Tilda Thamar, Julien Carette and Noël Roquevert.

The film's sets were designed by the art director Robert Hubert.

== Partial cast ==
- Tilda Thamar as La 'marquise'
- Julien Carette as Trinquet
- Noël Roquevert as Brécard
- André Gabriello as Poireau - le pochard
- Pierre Larquey as Monsieur Labiche
- Jacques Baumer as Le juge
- Sinoël as Le bedeau
- Milly Mathis as La bourgeoise
- Marcel Vallée as Charentin

== Bibliography ==
- Philippe Rège. Encyclopedia of French Film Directors, Volume 1. Scarecrow Press, 2009.
