= The Vampire of Düsseldorf =

- Directed by: Robert Hossein
- Screenplay by: Georges Tabet; Claude Desailly; André Tabet; Robert Hossein
- Produced by: Georges de Beauregard; Benito Perojo
- Starring: Robert Hossein; Marie-France Pisier; Roger Dutoit; Annie Anderson
- Cinematography: Alain Levent
- Edited by: Marie-Sophie Dubus
- Music by: André Hossein
- Production companies: Rome-Paris Films; Producciónes Benito Perojo; Mega Film
- Distributed by: Panta Cinematografica (Italy)
- Release dates: 7 April 1965 (France); 25 February 1966 (Spain)
- Countries: Spain; France; Italy
- Language: French

The Vampire of Düsseldorf (French: Le Vampire de Düsseldorf) is a 1965 thriller film directed by Robert Hossein. It was joint production between Spain, France and Italy. The film was based on the life and crimes of German serial killer Peter Kürten.

== Production ==
The Vampire of Düsseldorf was shot between September 28, 1964, and December 10, 1964.

== Reception ==
At a preview screening in Paris, Variety long-time Paris correspondent Gene Moskowitz wrote that Hossein had "wisely not tried to emulate M and that the director "obviously has seen and assimilated many of these pix and does not imitate but takes the ideas and aspects of the times. But this only a moderate suspense item, which may be an okay play-off item on its theme, with arty chances broad chancey."
