= Adam Is Eve =

1954 French film

- Directed by: René Gaveau
- Written by: René Gaveau
- Based on: Adam est Ève by Francis Didelot
- Produced by: Fernand Rivers; Lucien Viard
- Starring: Michèle Carvel; Jean Carmet; Thérèse Dorny
- Cinematography: Georges Leclerc
- Edited by: Michelle David
- Music by: Jean Yatove
- Production companies: Les Films Fernand Rivers; Orex Films
- Distributed by: Les Films Fernand Rivers
- Release date: 30 July 1954
- Running time: 92 minutes
- Country: France
- Language: French

Adam Is Eve (French: Adam est... Ève) is a 1954 French comedy film directed by René Gaveau and starring Michèle Carvel, Jean Carmet and Thérèse Dorny. It is based on the 1952 novel of the same name by Francis Didelot and was the first French film that covered sex change.

== Synopsis ==
Charles Beaumont is finishing his national service and is engaged to be married. After taking part in a boxing match he increasingly feels strange sensations and goes to consult a doctor. He is transformed into Charlotte, a young woman. Unwilling to tell his family or fiancée, he disappears and earns a living dancing in a nude cabaret show.

== Cast ==
- Michèle Carvel as Charles / Charlotte Beaumont
- Jean Carmet as Gaston
- Thérèse Dorny as Mme Beaumont
- Mireille Perrey as Mme Corinne
- Antoine Balpêtré as Dr. Charman
- Anouk Ferjac as Claire
- Antoinette Moya as Adeline Beaumont
- Robert Lombard as Alphonse
- Robert Rocca as Léon
- Gilbert Guiraud as Lucien
- René Blancard as M Beaumont
- Jean Tissier as M Lapopie
- Georges Bever as Le garçon
- Fransined as Le brigadier
- Claire Gérard as La concierge
- François Joux as La pâte brisée
- Michel Nastorg as Le maître d'hôtel
- André Numès Fils as Le commissaire
- René Berthier as Le portier

== Bibliography ==
- Goble, Alan. The Complete Index to Literary Sources in Film. Walter de Gruyter, 1999.
- Reeser, Todd W. (2017). "Transsexuality and the Production of French Universalism: René Gaveau's "Adam est... Ève" (1954)". The French Review. 91 (2): 126–138. ISSN 0016-111X.
