= Beautiful Love (film) =

1951 film

- Directed by: François Campaux
- Written by: François Campaux
- Produced by: François Campaux
- Starring: Giselle Pascal; António Vilar; Odile Versois
- Cinematography: René Gaveau
- Edited by: Michelle David
- Music by: Alfred Desenclos; André Theurer
- Production company: Prodex
- Distributed by: Cocinor
- Release date: 1 June 1951
- Running time: 97 minutes
- Country: France
- Language: French

Beautiful Love (French: Bel amour) is a 1951 French drama film directed by François Campaux and starring Giselle Pascal, António Vilar and Odile Versois. The film's sets were designed by the art director Robert Hubert.

== Main cast ==
- Giselle Pascal as Suzanne Gérard-Moulin
- António Vilar as Dr. Claude Moulin
- Odile Versois as Helga Jorgensen
- Catherine Fonteney as Mme Moulin
- Marie-France as Petit-Pierre
- Charlotte Ecard as Mme Girard
- Adrienne D'Ambricourt as La vieille dame sourde
- Madeleine Barbulée as L'assistante du docteur Moulin
- Antoine Balpêtré as M. Moulin père
- Michel Salina as Dr. Bettinger

== Bibliography ==
- Philippe Rège. Encyclopedia of French Film Directors, Volume 1. Scarecrow Press, 2009.
