= Grand Gala =

1952 film

- Directed by: François Campaux
- Written by: François Campaux
- Produced by: François Campaux; Maurice Juven
- Starring: Ludmilla Tchérina; Odile Versois; Yves Vincent
- Cinematography: Jacques Lemare
- Edited by: Michelle David
- Music by: René Sylviano
- Production company: Prodex
- Distributed by: Les Films Fernand Rivers
- Release date: 5 December 1952
- Running time: 93 minutes
- Country: France
- Language: French

Grand Gala is a 1952 French drama film directed by François Campaux and starring Ludmilla Tchérina, Odile Versois and Yves Vincent. The film's sets were designed by the art directors Raymond Gabutti and Robert Gys.

== Synopsis ==
Pierre a soldier serving in French Morocco and Monique a dancer get married when he is discharged from the military. However, in Paris he fails to find any work while she enjoys success. He decides to go to Morocco in order to breed horses. Monique accompanies him, but grows jealous of his closeness to Anna a young widow who is passionate about horses.

== Cast ==
- Ludmilla Tchérina as Monique
- Odile Versois as Anna
- Yves Vincent as Pierre Bouvais
- Pierre Larquey as M. Punch, le clown
- André Gabriello as Michel
- Yvonne Alexander as Une danseuse
- Monique Aïssata as Zizi
- Olga Baïdar-Poliakoff as Poupoul
- Thomy Bourdelle as Robert
- Raoul Celada as Un danseur
- Annie Chartrette as Nadia
- Richard Flagey
- Anne-Marie Mersen
- Michel Rayne as Un danseur

== Bibliography ==
- Philippe Rège. Encyclopedia of French Film Directors, Volume 1. Scarecrow Press, 2009.
