= Claude Desailly =

French screenwriter

- Born: 14 April 1922; Cambrai, France
- Died: 26 April 2009 (aged 87); Gordes, Vaucluse, France
- Occupation: Writer
- Years active: 1948-1991 (film & TV)

Claude Desailly (14 April 1922 – 26 April 2009) was a French screenwriter. He collaborated on a number of films with the director Robert Hossein. He is best known for his creation and writing of the period crime television series Les Brigades du Tigre which ran from 1974 to 1983.

== Selected filmography ==
=== Film ===
- The Hotshot (1955)
- Lilli (1958)
- Mandrin (1962)
- Les Yeux cernés (1964)
- The Vampire of Düsseldorf (1965)
- I Killed Rasputin (1967)
- Cemetery Without Crosses (1969)
- Point de chute (1970)

=== Television ===
- Les Brigades du Tigre (1974-1983)
- Mathias Sandorf (1979)

== Bibliography ==
- Christian Bosseno. Télévision française La saison 2010: Une analyse des programmes du 1er septembre 2008 au 31 août 2009. Editions L'Harmattan, 2010.
