= I Killed Rasputin =

- Promotional poster
- Directed by: Robert Hossein
- Written by: Felix Yusupov; Paola Sanjust; Alain Decaux; Claude Desailly; Robert Hossein
- Produced by: Raymond Danon; Maurice Jacquin
- Starring: Gert Fröbe; Peter McEnery; Robert Hossein; Geraldine Chaplin
- Cinematography: Henri Persin
- Edited by: Jacqueline Thiédot
- Music by: André Hossein
- Production companies: Compania Generale Cinematografica; Films Copernic
- Distributed by: Comacico (1967) (France); Paramount Pictures (1968) (USA); Elite-Film (Filmzentrum) (1967) (Austria); Hafbo (1968) (Netherlands); Inter-Verleih Film-Gesellschaft (1967) (West Germany); Paramount Television (USA) (TV)
- Release date: 3 May 1967 (France)
- Running time: 135 min
- Countries: France; Italy
- Language: French

I Killed Rasputin (French: J'ai tué Raspoutine) is a 1967 Italo-Franco biographical film directed by Robert Hossein. Gert Fröbe stars as the main subject, Grigori Rasputin. It is based on the work Lost Splendor by Felix Yusupov, a nobleman and participant in the murder of Rasputin. The script was approved by Yusupov and he also agreed to appear in the film. In the introductory interview of the film, Yusupov demonstrated that his loathing for Rasputin remained undiminished. Filming began at the Billancourt Studios in Paris in December 1966. The film opened the 1967 Cannes Film Festival and later that year was released theatrically in France on 3 May.

== Plot ==
Grigori Rasputin becomes a fixture of Russia's Imperial Court after saving the life of Alexei Nikolaevich, Tsarevich of Russia, the haemophiliac heir to the throne. However as war breaks out, Rasputin's enemies see him as a cause and plot fatal revenge against the Russian mystic.

== Cast ==
- Gert Fröbe as Grigori Rasputin
- Peter McEnery as Felix Yusupov
- Robert Hossein as Serge Hukhotin
- Geraldine Chaplin as Mounia Golovine
- Ivan Desny as Grand Duke Alexander Mikhailovich of Russia
- Roger Pigaut as Vladimir Purishkevich
- Ira Fürstenberg as Irina Yusupova
- Patrick Balkany as Grand Duke Dmitri Pavlovich of Russia
- Nicolas Vogel as Dr. Lazovert
- France Delahalle as Grand Duchess Xenia Alexandrovna of Russia
- Katia Tchenko as A follower of Rasputin
