= Les Yeux cernés =

- Directed by: Robert Hossein
- Written by: Claude Desailly dialogue: André Tabet; Georges Tabet
- Produced by: Ludmilla Goulian
- Starring: Robert Hossein; Michèle Morgan; Marie-France Pisier
- Cinematography: Jean Boffety
- Edited by: Marie-Sophie Dubus
- Music by: André Hossein
- Release date: 2 September 1964
- Running time: 75 min
- Countries: France; Italy
- Language: French

Les Yeux cernés (English title: Marked Eyes) is a 1964 French thriller film directed by Robert Hossein who wrote the original story. The screenplay was written by Claude Desailly, André Tabet and Georges Tabet. The film stars Robert Hossein, Michèle Morgan and Marie-France Pisier.

It tells the story of a widow who begins to receive blackmail letters demanding money as almost everybody has disliked her husband in a small town.
