= Point de chute =

1970 film by Robert Hossein

- Film poster
- Directed by: Robert Hossein
- Screenplay by: Claude Desailly; Robert Hossein
- Story by: Claude Desailly; Robert Hossein
- Starring: Johnny Hallyday; Pascale Rivault; Robert Hossein; Albert Minski
- Cinematography: Daniel Diot
- Edited by: Jacqueline Thiédot
- Music by: André Hossein
- Production companies: Les Films Marceau; Filmsonor
- Release date: September 11, 1970 (France)
- Country: France

Point de chute (lit. 'Falling Point') is a 1970 French film, directed by Robert Hossein and starring Johnny Hallyday as Vlad, the Romania and Pascale Rivault as Catherine. The film is about three masked criminals who kidnap the fifteen-year-old Catherine and take her to an isolated shack by the sea. While she tries to escape, she grows closer with the kidnapper, Vlad who is left to watch over her.

The film stars French singer Johnny Hallyday as Vlad. Hallyday was a popular singer in France and was initially going to star in the film alongside another French singer, France Gall. When Gall and Hossein missed meetings for organizing the production it led to Pascale Rivault making her film debut as Catherine. The film was shot near Royan in France between March and May 1970. The film was released to positive reviews in France but did poorly in the French box office.

== Cast ==
Cast adapted from French Thrillers of the 1970s: Volume I, Crime Films (2026).

- Johnny Hallyday as Vlad, "The Romanian"
- Pascale Rivault as Catherine
- Robert Hossein as the boss
- Robert Dalban as the inspector
- Albert Minski as Eddie
- Jacques Castlelot as the father

== Production ==
Point de chute was a French film production, by the two Paris-based film production companies Les Films Marceau and Filmsonor. It was directed by Robert Hossein, with a story and screenplay by Claude Desailly. Johnny Hallyday was cast for Point de chute. At the time of production, Hallyday was among France's most popular singers. He had just finished filming Sergio Corbucci's Western film The Specialists (1969). Hallyday recalled that at the time in his career, he was tired of his image in popular culture, describing it as being "tired of singing in front of a camera rather than a microphone, tired of riding a horse, shooting bullets all around and playing second-rate cowboys" and that he "had an enormous and deep need to play a poignant role, or rather, as [Hossein] often demanded during filming, to be sincere." Hallyday said later of all his films, this was the only one he felt was "out of the ordinary", but according to his manager Jean Pons, the actor said that three weeks in that he felt the film was not going to be good and no long believed in it.

For the film, Hallyday recorded the song "La Chanson du Roumain", which was co-written by Jean Renard and Philippe Labro initially for Sylvie Vartan. The song went unused and remained unreleased until 1993. The score was by André Hossein, who is Robert Hossein's father.

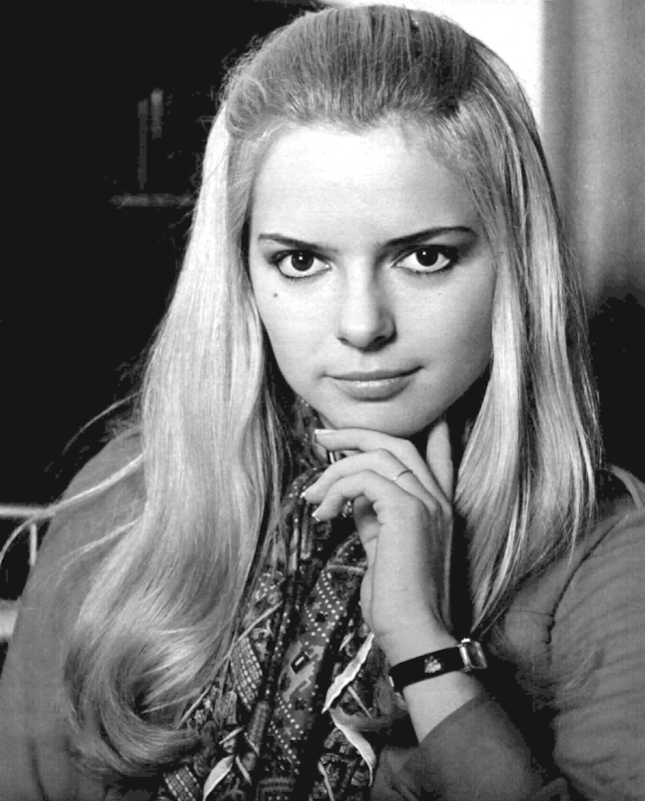
France Gall in 1969. Gall was initially intended for the role of Catherine, which eventually went to Pascale Rivault.

Hossein initially had planned to pair Hallyday with the singer France Gall. Initial meetings between the director and Gall did not happen as Hossein was late to meet with her, which led to Gall having to leave for other work. This led to Pascale Rivault being cast in her debut role. Rivault would work with Hossein in several further films, while the two later entered a brief relationship.

Filming began on March 19, 1970, under the title Le Scandale de vivre (lit. 'The Scandal of Living'). It was filmed at the Pointe de la Coubre cape near Royan, and was being filmed until May.

== Release and reception ==
Point de chute was released in France on September 11, 1970. Roberto Curti and Frank Lafond, the authors of French Thrillers of the 1970s: Volume I, Crime Films (2026), wrote that the film "performed poorly" in the French box office, with 778,000 spectators.

The film was only rarely screened outside of France. It was shown as in San Francisco as a part of a retrospective on French film noir titled "The French Had a Name For It '21" in November 2021.

Curti and Lafond said that French film critics praised the film. Jacques Chancel of Paris-Jour said the film had Hallyday cast not to attract fans of his music, but to show his qualities as an actor.

From retrospective reviews, Curti and Frank Lafond said that Hossein restrains his customary narcissism as an actor in the film, but as a director he "pulls out all the stops" with use of slow motion and visual analogies that along with the cinematography of Daniel Diot, made it interesting to watch. They found the film's story to be thin due to its melodramatic nature and that its ending was "dangerously close to ridiculous." They critiqued Andre Hossein's score as being plagiarized from the "Romnce in E minor" from René Clément's Forbidden Games (1952).

== See also ==
- List of French films of 1970
