= Summer Storm (1949 film) =

- Directed by: Jean Gehret
- Written by: Louis Chavance; Jacopo Comin; Michel Davet
- Starring: Gaby Morlay; Odette Joyeux; Odile Versois
- Cinematography: Giorgio Orsini
- Edited by: Otello Colangeli
- Music by: Marcel Delannoy
- Production companies: Produzioni Atlas Consorziate; Pathé Consortium Cinéma
- Distributed by: Pathé Consortium Cinéma
- Release date: 22 December 1949
- Running time: 80 minutes
- Countries: France; Italy
- Language: French

Summer Storm (French: Orage d'été) is a 1949 French-Italian drama film directed by Jean Gehret and starring Gaby Morlay, Odette Joyeux and Odile Versois. A separate Italian-language version was also released.

== Cast ==
- Gaby Morlay as Mme. Arbelot
- Odette Joyeux as Marie-Blanche
- Peter Trent as Ralph
- Antoine Balpêtré as M. Arbelot
- Odile Versois as Marie-Lou
- Marina Vlady as Marie-Tempête
- Alain Feydeau
- Olga Baïdar-Poliakoff
- Laure Thierry as Marie-Aimée
- Gilles Aillaud

== Bibliography ==
- Quinlan, David. The Film Lover's Companion: An A to Z Guide to 2,000 Stars and the Movies They Made. Carol Publishing Group, 1997.
