= The Blue Veil (1951 film) =

1951 American drama film

- 1951 theatrical poster
- Directed by: Curtis Bernhardt
- Written by: Norman Corwin; Based on a story by François Campaux
- Produced by: Jerry Wald; Norman Krasna
- Starring: Jane Wyman; Charles Laughton; Joan Blondell
- Cinematography: Franz Planer
- Edited by: George Amy
- Music by: Franz Waxman
- Production company: Wald/Krasna Productions
- Distributed by: RKO Pictures
- Release dates: September 5, 1951 (Los Angeles; press screening); October 26, 1951 (New York)
- Running time: 113 minutes
- Country: United States
- Language: English
- Box office: $3,550,000

The Blue Veil is a 1951 American historical drama film directed by Curtis Bernhardt and starring Jane Wyman, Charles Laughton and Joan Blondell. It tells the story of a woman who spends her life caring for other people’s children, beginning just after World War I. The title refers to the headdresses once worn by governesses and nannies, colored blue to distinguish them from the white veils worn by medical nurses. The screenplay by Norman Corwin is based on a story by François Campaux, adapted for the French-language film Le voile bleu in 1942.

== Plot ==
Following the death of her newborn baby, war widow LouLou Mason accepts a temporary two-week assignment as nursemaid to the infant son of corset manufacturer Frederick K. Begley, who lost his wife in childbirth. She ingratiates herself with the family and eventually becomes a permanent fixture. When she declines Frederick's marriage proposal, he weds his secretary Alicia Torgersen, who fires LouLou following her honeymoon.

LouLou finds employment with wealthy Henry and Fleur Palfrey and begins to care for baby Robbie. Older son Harrison is expelled from boarding school because of his poor grades and bad behavior and returns home with his tutor, Jerry Kean. When Jerry is offered a job in Beirut, he impulsively proposes to LouLou, who accepts. While waiting for his fiancée to pack, Jerry speaks to Fleur, who warns him about marrying a woman whom he barely knows. Having second thoughts, he suggests waiting a few months before marrying, and she remains with the Palfreys.

Years pass, and LouLou is nursemaid to Stephanie, the 12-year-old daughter of fading musical actress Annie Rawlins. When Annie is delayed at an audition and misses Stephanie's confirmation, Stephanie tells her friends that LouLou is her mother. Realizing that Stephanie has become too attached to her, Loulou decides to find work elsewhere.

Just prior to the start of World War II, LouLou accepts a job with Helen and Hugh Williams. Hugh joins the military and is injured in battle, prompting his wife to join him in England. Two years pass, and the widowed Helen, who still has not returned home, stops sending money to support her son Tony. LouLou accepts responsibility for the boy and raises him as her own. Years later, when Helen notifies her that she is returning with her new husband, LouLou flees to Florida with Tony, but is arrested and charged with kidnapping. Although he is sympathetic to LouLou's situation, the district attorney is compelled by law to return Tony to Helen.

Now too old to be entrusted with the care of a baby, LouLou accepts a janitorial job in an elementary school in order to be close to children. When she visits an ophthalmologist, she discovers that he is Robbie Palfrey, the adult son of her former employers. Robbie invites her to his home for dinner the following week and arranges for all of the children for whom she cared to be there with their spouses. As LouLou reunites with her former charges, Robbie announces that he wants her to become the nanny for his own children.

== Cast ==
- Jane Wyman as LouLou Mason
- Charles Laughton as Frederick K. Begley
- Joan Blondell as Annie Rawlins
- Richard Carlson as Jerry Kean
- Agnes Moorehead as Fleur Palfrey
- Carleton G. Young as Henry Palfrey
- Audrey Totter as Helen Williams
- Cyril Cusack as Frank Hutchins
- Natalie Wood as Stephanie Rawlins
- Vivian Vance as Alicia Torgersen
- Harry Morgan as Charles Hall
- Dan O'Herlihy as Hugh Williams
- Don Taylor as Dr. Robert Palfrey
- Everett Sloane as District Attorney
- Alan Napier as Prof. George Carter
- Lisa Golm as Elsa

== Production ==
The film was the first in a planned series of 60 films that the team of Jerry Wald and Norman Krasna agreed to produce for RKO Pictures over the course of five years, with an overall budget of $50 million.

Celeste Holm was the producers' first choice for the role of Annie Rawlins, but she was starring in the Broadway play Affairs of State at the time. Katherine Locke was cast as Charles Laughton's wife but was replaced with Vivian Vance.

Robert Newton was originally cast in the role of Frank Hutchins but was unable to play the part because of his commitment to appear in Androcles and the Lion. He was replaced by Cyril Cusack.

The confirmation scene was filmed at All Saints Episcopal Church in Pasadena, California.

== Release ==
The film was screened for an audience of press members at the Carthay Circle Theatre in Los Angeles on September 5, 1951, and the response was positive.

Although producers Jerry Wald and Norman Krasna were invited to submit the film into the 1951 Venice Film Festival, it was not shown there.

The world premiere was held at the Criterion Theatre in New York on October 26, 1951. The producers had previously attempted to negotiate for a Radio City Music Hall premiere.

== Reception ==
In a contemporary review for The New York Times, critic Bosley Crowther wrote:

[S]ince the classy package marks the first independent producing effort of the ingenious Jerry Wald and Norman Krasna at R.K.O., this drama of love and self-sacrifice might have turned out to be as sensitive as it is ambitious. Actually, it is—both—down to the last probable box-office penny. ... Mr. Corwin's scenario, under Curtis Bernhardt's soupy direction, stretches Miss Wyman's situation—a self chosen one, mind you—into a series of parchedly sunlit episodes, contrived to squeeze the heart and present this lady as a quivering -lipped saint. There is little in the way of wit, grit or, for that matter, real substance. One scene, cutting from little Natalie Wood's sticky disappointment during religious confirmation to Mama Joan Blondell's raucous musical-comedy auditioning is a new low in tasteless synthetics.

Critic Philip K. Scheuer of the Los Angeles Times wrote: "Most people will be deeply moved by this production, and find it singularly absorbing. I might even say that it grows on a second view. There are many reasons to believe that it may bring Miss Wyman's second Academy Award for a performance that has so many fine facets. She makes later scenes intense and even powerful with her acting. The subdued rendition that she gives the role is a splendid technical buildup to this climax."

The film earned $2.2 million in rentals in the U.S. and Canada during 1951 and total rentals of $3,550,000, returning a profit of $450,000. In May 1952, it was reported the film had returned net earnings to Wald and Krasna of $800,000.

== Awards ==
Award	Category	Nominee	Result
Academy Awards	Best Actress	Jane Wyman	Nominated
Academy Awards	Best Supporting Actress	Joan Blondell	Nominated
Golden Globe Awards	Best Actress in a Motion Picture – Drama	Jane Wyman	Won
Laurel Awards	Best Female Dramatic Performance	Jane Wyman	Won
Picturegoer Awards	Best Actress	Jane Wyman	Won

== Adaptation ==
The Blue Veil was presented on Lux Radio Theatre on November 24, 1952. The one-hour adaptation starred Wyman in her screen role.
