= Black Feathers =

1952 film

- Directed by: Oreste Biancoli
- Written by: Oreste Biancoli; Giuseppe Driussi; Giuseppe Berto; Paola Ojetti; Alberto Albani Barbieri; Salvator Gotta
- Produced by: Folco Laudati
- Starring: Marcello Mastroianni; Marina Vlady; Camillo Pilotto
- Cinematography: Fernando Risi
- Edited by: Adriana Novelli
- Music by: Francesco Mander
- Production companies: Mander Film; Sirio Film
- Distributed by: Mander Film
- Release date: 21 November 1952
- Running time: 95 minutes
- Country: Italy
- Language: Italian

Black Feathers (Italian: Penne nere) is a 1952 Italian war drama film directed by Oreste Biancoli and starring Marcello Mastroianni, Marina Vlady and Camillo Pilotto. It was shot at the Titanus Studios in Rome. The film's sets were designed by the art director Ottavio Scotti.

== Plot ==
Two young people, Pieri Cossutti and Gemma Vianello, live their love in the town of Stella, an alpine village in Carnia located next to a large dam, not far from the border between Italy and Austria. The Second World War provokes the call to arms of Pieri and his brother Olinto, who must leave his wife and little son. Gemma's father dies during a bombing, and at that point she is welcomed into the Cossutti house.

At the time of the armistice of 8 September, Pieri and Olinto are in Albania, from where - with other Italian soldiers who refuse to surrender to the Germans - they begin a long march to return to their homeland. Among the hardships, the group gradually shrinks and even Olinto dies.

Pieri and a few others arrive in Stella and are able to courageously prevent the Germans from blowing up the great dam. Gemma is injured and Pieri decides to marry her on the verge of death. The woman, however, against all odds, recovers and the two will finally live their complete love story.

== Cast ==
- Marcello Mastroianni as Pietro 'Pieri' Cossutti
- Marina Vlady as Gemma Vianello
- Camillo Pilotto as Zef Cossutti - il nonno
- Vera Carmi as Catina Cossutti
- Guido Celano as Olinto Cossutti
- Enzo Staiola as Antonio 'Tonino' Cossutti
- Hélène Vallier as Natalìa Cossutti
- Liuba Soukhanowa as Giulia Cossutti
- Giuseppe Chirarandini as Don Angelo - il prete

== Bibliography ==
- Perra, Emiliano. Conflicts of Memory: The Reception of Holocaust Films and TV Programmes in Italy, 1945 to the Present. Peter Lang, 2010.
