= The Hotshot =

1955 film

- Directed by: Dimitri Kirsanoff
- Written by: Jacques Companéez; Claude Desailly; Louis Martin
- Produced by: Jean Lefait; Ray Ventura
- Starring: Marina Vlady; Raymond Pellegrin; Dora Doll
- Cinematography: Roger Fellous
- Edited by: Monique Kirsanoff
- Music by: Marc Lanjean
- Production companies: Hoche Productions; Vascos Films
- Distributed by: Les Films Corona
- Release date: 10 May 1955
- Running time: 92 minutes
- Country: France
- Language: French

The Hotshot or The Show-Off (French: Le crâneur) is a 1955 French crime drama film directed by Dimitri Kirsanoff and starring Marina Vlady, Raymond Pellegrin and Dora Doll. It was shot at the Billancourt Studios in Paris. The film's sets were designed by the art director Robert Hubert.

== Cast ==
- Marina Vlady as Juliette
- Raymond Pellegrin as Philippe
- Dora Doll as Betty Bell
- Hélène Vallier as Paule
- Paul Demange as Le concierge
- Géo Dorlis as L'animateur du Toboggan
- Georges Lannes as Le commissaire Godet
- Jacques Muller as Bébert
- Robert Le Béal as L'anglais
- Marcel Portier as Le client qui a sommeil
- Simone Logeart as Une employée du Toboggan
- Alain Nobis as Tonio
- Paul Frankeur as Georges
- Luc Andrieux as Willy - le barman du Toboggan
- France Asselin as L'amie du client qui a sommeil
- René Bergeron as Le patron de l'hôtel du Midi
- Jo Charrier as Le truand à la recherche d'un alibi
- Edmond Chemi as Un invité au banquet
- Lucien Desagneaux as Le patron de l'hôtel du Midi
- René Hell as Le chanteur au banquet
- Franck Maurice as L'agent en faction
- Louis Saintève as Un client du Toboggan
- Nicky Voillard as Une invitée au banquet

== Bibliography ==
- Bessy, Maurice & Chirat, Raymond. Histoire du cinéma français: 1951-1955. Pygmalion, 1989.
- Rège, Philippe. Encyclopedia of French Film Directors, Volume 1. Scarecrow Press, 2009.
