= Forbidden Priests =

1973 film by Denys de La Patellière

- Poster "Pretres interdits"
- Directed by: Denys de La Patellière
- Written by: François Boyer; Jean-Claude Barreau; Denys de La Patellière (adaptation & dialogue by)
- Screenplay by: François Boyer; Jean-Claude Barreau
- Produced by: Georges de Beauregard; René Pignières
- Starring: Robert Hossein; Claude Jade
- Cinematography: Claude Durand
- Edited by: Jacques Fonteray
- Production company: Bela Productions
- Distributed by: Société Nouvelle de Cinématographie
- Release date: 22 November 1973
- Running time: 90 minutes
- Country: France
- Language: French

Forbidden Priests (Prêtres interdits) is a 1973 French drama romance war film directed by Denys de La Patellière and starring Robert Hossein and Claude Jade.

== Synopsis ==
This French melodrama tells the tragic story of a rare couple: Priest Jean (Robert Hossein), who falls in love with a young woman, the 17-year-old girl Françoise (Claude Jade was 25 during the shooting), has relations with her, and gets her pregnant. That happens during World War II. Some years later Françoise waits for her majority to get her child out from the orphanage and Jean becomes a communist.

== Cast ==
- Robert Hossein as L'abbé Jean Rastaud
- Claude Jade as Françoise Bernardeau
- Pierre Mondy as Paul Lacoussade
- Claude Piéplu as L'abbé Grégoire Ancely
- Louis Seigner as L'évêque
- Germaine Delbat as La mère de Jean
- Georges Audoubert as Le père de Françoise
- Lucienne Legrand as Madame Bernardeau
- Michèle Watrin as La cousine de Françoise
- Fabrice Mouchel as Le petit François
- Guy Di Rigo as Le nouveau maire
- Yves Barsacq as Le favori
