= René Gaveau =

French cinematographer (1900–1972)

René Gaveau (1900–1972) was a French cinematographer and film director. Born on September 2, 1900 in Saint-Mandé (France), and died on February 8, 1972 in the 2nd arrondissement of Paris. He was also a film producer and screenwriter.

== Selected filmography ==
=== Cinematographer ===
- André Cornélis (1918)
- My Uncle Benjamin (1924)
- Mandrin (1924)
- The Nude Woman (1926)
- André Cornélis (1927)
- Instinct (1930)
- The Fortune (1931)
- Passport 13.444 (1931)
- Kiss Me (1932)
- Paris-Soleil (1933)
- Odette (1934)
- Count Obligado (1935)
- Compliments of Mister Flow (1936)
- Wolves Between Them (1936)
- White Cargo (1937)
- A Man to Kill (1937)
- Chéri-Bibi (1938)
- The Rebel (1938)
- The Chess Player (1938)
- The Spirit of Sidi-Brahim (1939)
- Radio Surprises (1940)
- President Haudecoeur (1940)
- The Blue Veil (1942)
- Mademoiselle Béatrice (1943)
- The White Waltz (1943)
- Home Port (1943)
- Night Shift (1944)
- Pamela (1945)
- Bifur 3 (1945)
- The Last Metro (1945)
- The Mysterious Monsieur Sylvain (1947)
- The Eleven O'Clock Woman (1948)
- The Cupid Club (1949)
- Night Round (1949)
- Last Love (1949)
- Véronique (1950)
- Rome Express (1950)
- Beautiful Love (1951)
- The Most Beautiful Girl in the World (1951)
- Love in the Vineyard (1952)

=== Director ===
- Adam Is Eve (1954)
- Zaza (1956)
