= Antoine Balpêtré =

French actor

- Born: 3 May 1898; Lyon, France
- Died: 28 March 1963 (aged 64); Paris, France
- Occupation: Actor
- Years active: 1933–1963

Antoine Balpêtré (French pronunciation: [ɑ̃twan balpetʁe]; 3 May 1898 – 28 March 1963) was a French stage and film actor. He appeared in more than 50 films between 1933 and 1963.

== Partial filmography ==
- The Agony of the Eagles (1933) - Le commandant Thiéry
- The House of Mystery (1933) - Rudeberg
- Gaspard de Besse (1935)- Cabasse
- The World Will Tremble (1939) - le client milliardaire
- Le duel (1941) - Le constructeur Bugnet
- The Murderer Lives at Number 21 (1942) - Albert, le ministre de l'Intérieur (uncredited)
- Picpus (1943) - Le grand patron
- La Main du diable (1943) - Denis
- Le Corbeau (1943) - Le docteur Delorme
- The Visitor (1946) - Louberger
- Fort de la solitude (1948) - Le commissaire
- La figure de proue (1948) - Le père Morfouage
- Paysans noirs (1948) - Le médecin
- Fantomas Against Fantomas (1949) - Le président du conseil
- Suzanne and the Robbers (1949) - Bevardel
- Le paradis des pilotes perdus (1949) - Révérend-Père Spach
- Millionaires for One Day (1949) - Toubib
- Summer Storm (1949) - M. Arbelot
- Plus de vacances pour le Bon Dieu (1950) - L'inspecteur de police
- Justice Is Done (1950) - Le président du tribunal
- God Needs Men (1950) - Le père Gourvennec, un pêcheur
- Diary of a Country Priest (1951) - Dr. Delbende (Docteur Delbende)
- Beautiful Love (1951) - M. Moulin père
- Le Plaisir (1952) - Monsieur Poulain - L'ancien maire (segment "La Maison Tellier")
- We Are All Murderers (1952) - Dr. Albert Dutoit
- Son of the Hunchback (1952) - Pérolle
- The Road to Damascus (1952) - Gamaliel
- Alarm in Morocco (1953) - Le juge
- Tempest in the Flesh (1954) - Sébastien
- Stain in the Snow (1954) - Holtz
- Before the Deluge (1954) - Monsieur Albert Dutoit
- Adam Is Eve (1954) - Dr. Charman
- Mourez, nous ferons le reste (1954) - Le maire
- The Red and the Black (1954) - L'abbé Pirard
- House of Ricordi (1954) - Dottor Fleury (uncredited)
- A Free Woman (1954) - Collega di Liana (uncredited)
- Black Dossier (1955) - Dutoit
- Il piccolo vetraio (1955) - Neroni
- If Paris Were Told to Us (1956) - Verlaine
- The Case of Doctor Laurent (1957) - Docteur René Vanolli
- I Vampiri (1957) - Professor Julien du Grand
- Happy Arenas (1958) - Le clochard
- Ce corps tant désiré (1959) - M. Messardier
- Magnificent Sinner (1959) - Kilbatchich
- A Mistress for the Summer (1960) - Le poète
- The President (1961) - Un ministre (uncredited)
- Le cave se rebiffe (1961) - Lucas Malvoisin
- The Burning Court (1962) - Dr. Hermann
- Axel Munthe, The Doctor of San Michele (1962) - Leblanc
- La salamandre d'or (1962) - L'évêque
- Mathias Sandorf (1963) - Professor Ernst Bathory
- L'espionne sera à Nouméa (1963)
