= François Campaux =

French film director, screenwriter and playwright (1906–1983)

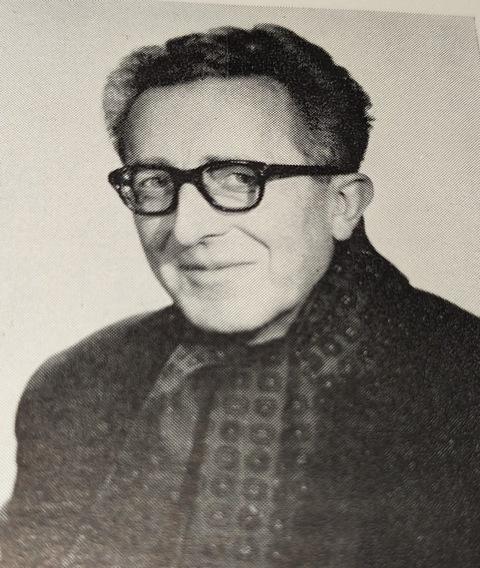
- Born: 14 April 1906; Auxerre,
- Died: 8 August 1983 (aged 77); Paris

François Campaux (14 April 1906 in Auxerre- 8 August 1983 in Paris) was a French film director, screenwriter and playwright.

== Filmography ==
=== Director ===
- 1946 : Henri Matisse (short film)
- 1949 : Night Round
- 1951 : Beautiful Love (or Le calvaire d'une mère)
- 1953 : Grand Gala

=== Screenwriter ===
- 1938 : Mirages by Alexandre Ryder
- 1942 : The Blue Veil by Jean Stelli
- 1943 : The White Waltz by Jean Stelli
- 1946 : Henri Matisse (short film) by himself
- 1951 : Bel Amour (film) by himself
- 1951 : The Blue Veil by Curtis Bernhardt
- 1953 : Grand Gala by himself
- 1956 : Mannequins of Paris by André Hunebelle
- 1973 : Vidita negra by Rogelio A. González
- 1974 : Agapi mou Oua-Oua by Giannis Dalianidis
- 1979 : Tesoro mio by Giulio Paradisi

== Theater ==
- 1963 : Des enfants de cœur, directed by Christian-Gérard, Théâtre Michel (Paris)
- 1966 : Au théâtre ce soir : Chérie noire, directed by François Campaux and Pierre Sabbagh, at Théâtre Marigny
- 1967 : Une femme à louer, directed by Christian Alers, La Pépinière-Théâtre
