= Fantomas Against Fantomas =

1949 film

- Directed by: Robert Vernay
- Written by: Marcel Allain; Pierre Laroche; Solange Térac; Robert Vernay
- Produced by: Hubert d'Achon
- Starring: Marcelle Chantal; Aimé Clariond; Alexandre Rignault
- Cinematography: Maurice Barry
- Edited by: Marthe Poncin
- Music by: Joe Hajos
- Production company: Latino Consortium Cinéma
- Distributed by: Pathé Consortium Cinéma
- Release date: 8 February 1949
- Running time: 95 minutes
- Country: France
- Language: French

Fantomas Against Fantomas (French: Fantômas contre Fantômas) is a 1949 French horror mystery thriller film directed by Robert Vernay and starring Marcelle Chantal, Aimé Clariond and Alexandre Rignault. It portrays the fictional master criminal Fantômas, who has had numerous films depicting his adventures.

The film's sets were designed by the art director Raymond Gabutti.

== Partial cast ==
- Aimé Clariond as Bréval
- Maurice Teynac as Fantomas
- Marcelle Chantal as Irène de Charras
- Yves Furet as Fandor
- Antoine Balpêtré as le président du conseil
- Alexandre Rignault as le commissaire Juve
- Jean Temerson as le président du Consortium du Marché Noir
- Michel Seldow as un membre du consortium
- Léonce Corne as un membre du consortium
- Robert Arnoux as Noblet
- Yves Deniaud as l'ordonnateur
- Jacques Tarride as le poète
- Nora Coste as Christiane
- Odile Versois as la jeune fille
- Berthe Bovy as la vieille dame
- Jane Daury as la secrétaire
- Janine Marsay as une folle
- Gilbert Moreau as un aviateur
- Paul Faivre as l'huissier
- Lyne Carrel as l'hôtesse de l'air
- Sabine André as la cabaretière
- Geneviève Morel as Irma
- Marfa Dhervilly as la dame du métro
- Palmyre Levasseur as la femme de ménage
- Andrews Engelmann as un fou
- Jean Berton as un fou
- Paul Azaïs as Martin
- Marcel Pérès as Jules
- Maurice Salabert as un complice
- Jean d'Yd as le neurologue
- Jean Sinoël as le petit vieux
- Eugène Stuber as un infirmier
- Henri Coutet as le comptable
- Robert Moor as le médecin légiste
- Victor Vina as un parent du défunt
- Emile Riandreys as l'homme assassiné à l'hôpital
- Marcel Lestan as un ouvrier
- Marcel Marceau as un homme dans le métro
- Eugène Frouhins as un brigadier
- René Lacourt as un gendarme
- Albert Michel as un agent
- Albert Broquin as un homme suivant le cercueil
- Marcel Rouzé as un inspecteur dans le train
- Luang Van Yan as un homme de Fantômas
- Charles Bayard as l'homme distingué du métro
- Alfred Baillou as un suspect
- Jacques Gencel as le fils de Jules

== Bibliography ==
- Oscherwitz, Dayna; Higgins, MaryEllen (2009). The A to Z of French Cinema. Lanham, MD: Scarecrow Press. ISBN 978-0-8108-7038-3.
