= Alfred Desenclos =

French composer (1912–1971)

Alfred Desenclos (7 February 1912 – 3 March 1971) was a French composer of (modern) classical music. Desenclos was a self-described "romantic" whose music is highly expressive and atmospheric and rooted in rigorous compositional technique.

To support his large family (he was one of ten children), Desenclos had to renounce continuing his general studies and work as an industrial designer in the textile industry until the age of 20, but in 1929, he entered the Conservatory in Roubaix, France, to study piano. Until that time, he had played only as an amateur. He was admitted to the Conservatoire de Paris in 1932, where he won prizes in fugue, harmony, composition and accompaniment, supporting himself by fulfilling the role of 'maître de chapelle' (Kapellmeister) at the church of Notre-Dame-de-Lorette, in the 9th arrondissement of Paris.

His sacred music belongs to the tradition begun by Saint-Saëns and continued by Fauré. He won the Prix de Rome in 1942, the year in which he co-wrote (with André Theurer) the music to the film The Blue Veil.

Desenclos was the director of his alma mater, the Conservatoire de Roubaix, from 1943 to 1950 (where one of his pupils was film-maker Claude Chabrol's favourite composer Pierre Jansen) and taught harmony at the Conservatoire de Paris from 1967 to his death at the age of 59.

Desenclos's Messe de requiem was written in 1963 and published by Durand et Fils in 1967. In 1999, the piece was plagiarized by Atlanta-based composer Tristan Foison. Foison's mass was given its "American premiere" on 18 May 2001 in a performance by the Capitol Hill Chorale; soon after, the piece was discovered to be a note-for-note duplicate of Desenclos's.

The oeuvre of Alfred Desenclos, most of which was little-known outside the world of liturgic music during his lifetime, has enjoyed a strong revival in the concert hall and the recording studio over the last two decades, his 'Quatuor de saxophones' in particular establishing itself in the 20th century chamber music repertoire.

Alfred Desenclos's son Frédéric Desenclos (1961-) is an instrumentist who has performed internationally and currently is the organist at the Chapelle Royale of the Palace of Versailles.

== Selected filmography ==
- The Blue Veil (1942)
- Beautiful Love (1951)

== Compositions ==
- Aria & Rondo (double bass and piano)
- Bucoliques (flute and piano)
- Cantilène et divertissements (French horn and piano)
- Fantaisie (harp solo)
- Incantation, thrène et danse (trumpet and orchestra)
- Messe de requiem
- Nos autem (SSATBB a cappella)
- Plain-Chant et allegretto (trombone and piano)
- Préludes (need instrumentation)
- Préambule, complainte et final (French horn and piano)
- Prélude, cadence et finale (alto saxophone and piano)
  - In 1997, this piece was arranged for Alto Saxophone and Orchestra by Russell Peterson.
  - In 1999, this piece was arranged for Alto Saxophone and Winds by Donald Patterson and performed by Miles Smith with "The President's Own" United States Marine Band. The arrangement is available for rental from Theodore Presser Company.
    - in 2007, this piece was arranged for Alto Saxophone and small wind band by the Dutch saxophone player Karl Veen. However, the ensemble parts of this edition contain mistakes.
- Quatuor (saxophone quartet)
- Salve Regina (SATB chorus)
- Suite breve (piano solo)

== Selected recordings ==
- Joël Suhubiette, direction, Les Elements: Desenclos: Requiem (Éditions Hortus, HORT009).
- Delphian CD 34136: Desenclos Messe de Requiem Choir of King's College London, 2014
- Éric Aubier: incantation, Thrène et danse. CD: The art of the Trumpet, 2015
