= The Flavor of Corn =

- Publicity photo
- Il sapore del grano
- Directed by: Gianni Da Campo
- Written by: Gianni Da Campo
- Produced by: Chantal Lenoble-Bergamo; Enzo Porcelli
- Starring: Lorenzo Lena; Marco Mestriner
- Cinematography: Emilio Bestetti
- Music by: Franco Piersanti
- Production companies: Antea Films & RAI
- Distributed by: SACIS (Italy); Award Films (U.S.)
- Release date: 1986
- Running time: 93 minutes
- Country: Italy
- Language: Italian

The Flavor of Corn (Italian: Il sapore del grano; also known in English as The Taste of Wheat) is a 1986 Italian coming-of-age film. Written and directed by Gianni Da Campo, the film stars Lorenzo Lena and Marco Mestriner and follows the story of a relationship between a teacher and his 12-year-old student.

== Plot ==
Lorenzo is a young man who has been appointed as a school teacher in a small Italian village. One of his pupils, 12-year-old boy named Duilio, has romantic feelings toward Lorenzo. Lorenzo visits Duilio's home, meets with his family and they become good friends.

Lorenzo had met a woman on the train to the village with whom he falls in love, but his relationship with her is unfulfilling and they break up. During this time, Lorenzo grows closer to Duilio and they begin a secret romantic relationship. Many things change after Duilio’s stepmother begins to distrust Lorenzo. They begin to meet very rarely and Duilio starts to behave desperately to see Lorenzo. Lorenzo reflects on the nature of their relationship and decides to leave the village and Duilio.

== Cast ==
- Lorenzo Lena as Lorenzo
- Marco Mestriner as Duilio
- Alba Mottura as Cecilia
- Egidio Termine as Bruno
- Mattia Pinoli as Grandpa
- Paolo Garlato as Father
- Elena Barbalich as Adalgisa
- Elisabetta Barbini as Grandma
- Marina Vlady as Stepmother

== Reception ==
The Seattle Times lauded the film for being "unflinchingly honest" and the San Francisco Bay Area Reporter described the story as "fascinating", adding that the film "approaches its forbidden topic with an even hand and a warm heart." In September 2012, a "special event" screening of the film was arranged as part of a 1980s retrospective at the 17th Milano Film Festival, which touted the film as a "hidden jewel" that managed to avoid the familiar tropes and clichés employed by other films of the genre.

== Accolades ==
Year	Organization	Award	Recipient(s)	Result
1986	Festival del cinema neorealistico (Neorealist Film Festival)	Kim Arcalli Plaque	Gianni Da Campo (Director)	Won
1986	Festival del cinema neorealistico (Neorealist Film Festival)	Pietro Bianchi Plaque	Chantal Bergamo & Enzo Porcelli (Producers)	Won

== Home media ==
Since its original release in 1986, the film has been subtitled in various languages and distributed internationally on VHS and DVD in numerous countries, including Italy (released as Il sapore del grano), China (translated as The Taste of Wheat), Germany (released as Die Qual der Liebe), and the United States (released as The Flavor of Corn). In 1994, Award Films International released the film in North America in the VHS format with English subtitles. As of 2013, no evidence of an official North American DVD release had been found. However, in November 2011, Ripley's Home Video released the film in Italy in the Region 2 DVD format, which includes the option to watch with English subtitles.
