= The Tiger Brigades =

Television series

- Genre: Crime drama
- Created by: Claude Desailly
- Written by: Claude Desailly
- Directed by: Victor Vicas
- Starring: Jean-Claude Bouillon; Jean-Paul Tribout; Pierre Maguelon
- Composer: Claude Bolling
- Countries of origin: France; Switzerland; West Germany
- Original language: French
- No. of series: 6
- No. of episodes: 36

Production
- Running time: 52 minutes
- Production companies: Bayerischer Rundfunk; France 2 ORTF; TV-60 Filmproduktion; Télécip

Original release
- Network: France 2 (France); ARD (West Germany)
- Release: 21 December 1974 – 11 November 1983

The Tiger Brigades (French: Les Brigades du Tigre) is a period crime television series which originally ran between 1974 and 1983. Created by Claude Desailly, it follows the activities of a police squad in the early twentieth century.

In 2006, the film Les Brigades du Tigre was released, inspired by the television series.

== Main cast ==
- Jean-Claude Bouillon as Commissaire Paul Valentin
- Jean-Paul Tribout as L'inspecteur Pujol
- Pierre Maguelon as L'inspecteur Terrasson
- François Maistre as Faivre, le patron
- Pinkas Braun as Gabrielli

== Bibliography ==
- Christian Bosseno. Télévision française La saison 2010: Une analyse des programmes du 1er septembre 2008 au 31 août 2009. Editions L'Harmattan, 2010.
