= Frédéric Dard =

French crime writer

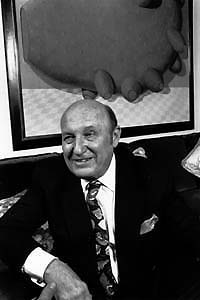
- Dard in 1992 (photo by Erling Mandelmann)
- Born: Frédéric Charles Antoine Dard; June 21, 1921; Bourgoin-Jallieu, France
- Died: 6 June 2000 (aged 78); Fribourg, Switzerland
- Other names: San-Antonio; Frédéric Charles; Kaput; L'Ange noir; Kill Him; Maxel Beeting; Cornel Milk; F. D. Ricard; Frederick Antony; Verne Goody; Wel Norton
- Occupations: Novelist, playwright, screenwriter
- Years active: 1940–2000
- Known for: Author of the San-Antonio book series (1949-2001)

Frédéric Charles Antoine Dard (29 June 1921, in Bourgoin-Jallieu, Isère, France – 6 June 2000, in Bonnefontaine, Fribourg, Switzerland)) also known under the pen name San-Antonio, was a French writer. Known as an author of crime fiction and as a humorist, he was noted for his ability to blend the two genres. Though Dard also wrote serious fiction, his most successful books used a farcical tone.

During his lifetime, Dard was the best-selling French-language author in the World. He wrote more than four hundred novels, including the San-Antonio book series, dozens of plays and several screenplays, under his own name and a variety of pseudonyms. Dard used San-Antonio both as his most famous pen name and as the name of the titular hero of his main series. The San-Antonio books eventually became so popular that Dard started using that pen name also for books that did not belong to the series.

Dard was best known for his raunchy humor and his inventive use of the French language, notably French slang.

== Biography ==
=== Early life ===
Frédéric Dard was born to a working-class family: his father was a metalworker and his mother was employed in a bakery. He first grew up in Saint-Chef before settling in Lyon, where he was mostly raised by his grandmother as his parents faced financial difficulties and his father struggled with alcoholism. Dard was born with a malformed shoulder and a disabled left arm, which caused him to endure exclusion and bullying as a child. Dard's disability remained a lifelong source of discomfort for him and he made constant efforts to hide it.

Dard started writing stories during his childhood, with the encouragement of his grandmother. While in high school, he began an apprenticeship in commerce but had little interest in his studies and took refuge in reading. He showed a preference for genre fiction, notably the hardboiled American-style crime novels of British authors Peter Cheyney and James Hadley Chase. His first published work was a short story titled Le Monocle révélateur (The Tell-Tale Monocle) that appeared in a children's magazine during his adolescence.

=== Career ===
While still a teenager, Dard had the opportunity to meet Lyon author Marcel E. Grancher who gave him his first job as a journalist. Dard published his first novel, La Peuchère, in 1940. That same year, he won his first literary award, the prix Lugdunum, for his book Monsieur Joos.

To advance his career, Dard left Lyon for the Parisian region with his family, settling in Les Mureaux in 1948. To earn a living, he produced all sort of writings assignments.

In 1949, Dard wrote the crime novel Réglez-lui son compte ! which would become the first volume of his San-Antonio series: he found the name of his protagonist by looking randomly at a map of the United States, eventually choosing the name of the city in Texas. The book sold poorly but it was bought by Armand de Caro, who headed Fleuve Noir, France's leading publishing house of genre fiction. De Caro saw potential in the book and took Dard under contract.

Throughout the 1950s, Dard's crime novels enjoyed increasing success, eventually making him France's most popular author. Dard used "San-Antonio" both as a pen name and as the title of his main series: the books were written in the first person as if they were the titular character's memoirs. Though he used various other pen names at the beginning of his career, Dard eventually also became a successful author under his real name. Both as San-Antonio and as Frédéric Dard, he was a best-selling author for Fleuve Noir, writing up to five books a year. However, his San-Antonio books were by far his most successful production. The fact that "San-Antonio" and Frédéric Dard were the same person was only revealed after several years.

Dard wrote 175 adventures of San-Antonio plus nine special volumes, of which millions of copies were sold in France. It has been estimated that Dard, whose work includes around 400 novels, sold about 250 million books in total, though this figure is impossible to verify. Dard also wrote over 30 plays, including some based on his own books and others based on the works of other authors, as well as radio dramas and several screenplays. In 1960, he directed the film Une gueule comme la mienne, based on one of his own novels.

While Dard wrote serious crime fiction under his own name, notably winning the 1957 Grand Prix de Littérature Policière for his book Le Bourreau pleure (The Executioner Weeps), his San-Antonio novels were known for their humor, which became more and more extravagant over time as the series evolved into satire, then outright parody. The series' titular protagonist is Commissioner (Detective Superintendent) Antoine San-Antonio, a handsome, dashing and womanizing police officer working for the French secret service.

Following the very first volume, which depicted San-Antonio's activities as a police officer, Dard wrote a few books that took place during World War II and depicted his character as a French Resistance undercover agent; however, he soon returned to detective stories with the character operating in post-war France. The series' other main character is San-Antonio's deputy, inspector Alexandre-Benoît Bérurier, an overweight, uncouth and somewhat dim-witted police officer. Introduced in volume 7 as a very minor character, Bérurier gradually evolved into a protagonist, eventually becoming San-Antonio's constant sidekick and one of the series' main sources of comic relief. San-Antonio and Bérurier have to fulfill impossible missions given by "Le Vieux" (the Old Man) AKA "Achille", the head of the French police. Other recurring or semi-recurring characters in the series include San-Antonio's other deputy, the old, sickly but wise inspector César Pinaud, San-Antonio's doting mother, Félicie, Bérurier's equally crass wife, Berthe, another of San-Antonio's deputies, French-African detective Jérémie Blanc, Bérurier's mischievous and smarter young niece, Marie-Marie (who eventually exited the series and came back years later as an adult, becoming San-Antonio's girlfriend), and San-Antonio's adopted son, Toinet. With the help of his colleagues, San-Antonio always succeeds in his missions through various eventful, sometimes absurd adventures. The San-Antonio novels often include sex scenes, told in a colorful, bawdy style.

At the height of Dard's popularity, each volume of his San-Antonio series sold about 600 000 copies in France, with some selling as much as one million copies. Dard eventually acknowledged that the books he signed as "San-Antonio" were much more popular than the ones he published under his real name. From 1979, he published all his books under the name San-Antonio, including those that were not part of the eponymous series. Also starting in the late 1970s, he published non-genre fiction, humorous essays and more elaborate novels that were critically well-received.

== Personal life ==
Dard was first married to Odette Demaison, with whom he had two children, Patrice (b.1944) who also became an author, and Elisabeth (1948-2011).

Dard acknowledged that he suffered from depressive episodes and that writing helped him overcome his anxieties. In 1965, as his marriage was failing and he suffered from overwork, he attempted suicide. In 1968, he remarried with Françoise de Caro, the daughter of his publisher: they had a daughter, Joséphine (b. 1970). Also in 1968, he moved to Switzerland. Shortly after Joséphine was born, Frédéric and Françoise also adopted a 12-year old Tunisian boy, Abdel.

In 1983, Dard's daughter Joséphine was kidnapped for a ransom: Joséphine was found alive after her parents paid the ransom, and her kidnapper was eventually apprehended. Coincidentally, at the time his daughter was abducted, Dard had been working on a novel that involved a kidnapping.

== Death and legacy ==
Dard died on June 6, 2000. The last San-Antonio book, which had been written with his son Patrice, was published posthumously. After Dard's death, Patrice continued the San-Antonio series until 2016, publishing 28 additional volumes. Frédéric Dard's body of work has retained a cult following in France.

Dard's San-Antonio series has been adapted several times into comic books and feature films.

The films based on the San-Antonio series are Sale temps pour les mouches (1966) and Béru et ces dames (1968), both directed by Guy Lefranc and starring Gérard Barray as San-Antonio and Jean Richard as Bérurier; San-Antonio ne pense qu'à ça (1980), directed by Joël Séria with Philippe Gasté as San-Antonio and Pierre Doris as Bérurier; and San-Antonio (2004), directed by Frédéric Auburtin with Gérard Lanvin in the title role and Gérard Depardieu as Bérurier.

Films based on Dard's other works include Les Salauds vont en enfer (The Wicked go to Hell, 1955) and Toi, le venin (Nude in a White Car, 1958), both directed by Robert Hossein, The Old Lady Who Walked in the Sea (1991) directed by Laurent Heynemann, as well as Y a-t-il un Français dans la salle ? (1982) and Le Mari de Léon (1992), both directed by Jean-Pierre Mocky.

As a writer, Dard is recognized for his linguistic inventiveness, which has been the subject of scholarly analyses. In many of his books, he used colorful slang and word plays, including slang words of his own invention. A Dictionnaire San-Antonio (San-Antonio Dictionary) was published in 1993, listing 15,000 words invented by him.

== Bibliography ==
Dard's books, including San-Antonio's adventures, have been translated into 35 different languages, including Italian, Romanian and Russian. A few have been translated into English:

- Tough Justice (Messieurs les hommes), by Cyril Buhler, Sphere Books, London, 1967; Duckworth, London, 1969; Norton, New York, 1969; Paperback Library 63-287, New York
- Stone Dead (C'est mort et ça ne sait pas), by Cyril Buhler, 1969, Paperback Library 63-283, New York, 1970
- Thugs And Bottles (Du brut pour les brutes), by Cyril Buhler, Sphere Books, London, 1969; Paperback Library 63-306, New York, 1970
- The Strangler (La fin des haricots), by Cyril Buhler, 1968, Sphere Books, London, 1969; Paperback Library 63-326, New York, 1970
- Knights Of Arabia (Bérurier au sérail), by Cyril Buhler, Duckworth, London, 1969; Paperback Library 63-341, New York, 1970
- From A To Z (De "A" jusqu'à "Z"), by Hugh Campbell, Duckworth, 1970, ISBN 0-7156-0410-4 (9780715604106); Paperback Library 63-352, 1970
- Crook's Hill, Paperback Library 63-342, New York
- The Sub Killers (La rate au court bouillon), by Cyril Buhler, Michael Joseph, 1971, ISBN 0-7181-0868-X (9780718108687)
- Alien Archipelago (L'archipel des malotrus), by Hugh Campbell, Michael Joseph, London, 1971, ISBN 0-7181-0869-8 (9780718108694)

Pushkin Press published a number of Dard novels written under his own name in the 1950s-1960s:

- The Wicked Go to Hell (Les salauds vont en enfer), 2016;
- Bird in a Cage (Le monte-charge), 2016;
- Crush (Les Scélérats), 2016;
- The Executioner Weeps (Le bourreau pleure), 2017;
- The King of Fools (La pelouse), 2017;
- The Gravediggers' Bread (Le Pain des fossoyeurs), 2018;
