= Marina Vlady =

French actress (1938–2026)

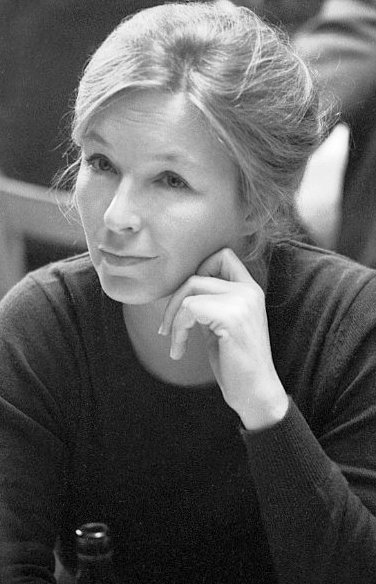
- Vlady in 1976
- Born: Catherine Marina de Poliakoff-Baydaroff; 10 May 1938; Clichy, Seine, France
- Died: 24 September 2026 (aged 88); Ivry-sur-Seine, Val-de-Marne, France
- Occupation: Actress
- Years active: 1949–2018
- Spouses: Robert Hossein (m. 1955; div. 1959) Jean-Claude Brouillet (m. 1963; div. 1966) Vladimir Vysotsky (m. 1970; died 1980)
- Partner(s): Léon Schwartzenberg (esp. 1981; d. 2003)
- Children: 3
- Relatives: Odile Versois (sister); Hélène Vallier (sister)
- Awards: Medal of Pushkin

Marina Vlady (born Catherine Marina de Poliakoff-Baïdaroff; (Note: Russian: Екатерина-Марина Полякова-Байдарова, romanized: Yekaterina-Marina Polyakova-Baydarova.) 10 May 1938 – 24 September 2026) was a French actress. Her film credits include The Conjugal Bed (1963), Two or Three Things I Know About Her (1967), The Flavor of Corn (1986) and Orson Welles's Chimes at Midnight (1966).

Vlady wrote about her ten-year, long-distance relationship with third husband Vladimir Vysotsky in the memoir Vladimir, or the Aborted Flight. Their long-distance relationship also inspired several of Vysotsky's songs. Vlady was also an advocate for abortion at a time when the procedure was illegal in France and she participated in protests against deportations of Arab workers from France.

For her role in The Conjugal Bed, Vlady won the Best Actress Award at the 1963 Cannes Film Festival.

== Early life ==
Catherine Marina de Poliakoff-Baïdaroff was born in Clichy on 10 May 1938, to White Russian immigrant parents. Her father, Vladimir Poliakoff, was an opera singer, and her mother, Militza, was a dancer. Her sisters, now all deceased, were the actresses Odile Versois, Hélène Vallier and Olga Baïdar-Poliakoff. The sisters began acting as children and, for a while, pursued a ballet career.

== Acting career ==
Vlady won the Best Actress Award at the 1963 Cannes Film Festival for The Conjugal Bed. In 1965, she was a member of the jury at the 4th Moscow International Film Festival.

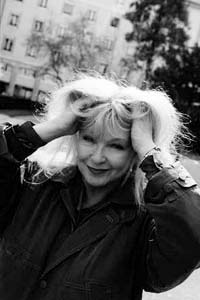
Marina Vlady, 1996

She starred in Jean-Luc Godard's Two or Three Things I Know About Her (1967), and later portrayed the insightful and protective stepmother in the Italian film The Flavor of Corn (1986). A rare English language role was as Kate Percy in Orson Welles's Chimes at Midnight (1966).

Her television credits include the 1983 mini-series La Chambre des Dames.

== Activism ==
In 1971, Vlady signed the Manifesto of the 343, which publicly declared she had an abortion as a way to advocate for abortion, even though the procedure was illegal in France at the time.

Vlady and her partner Léon Schwartzenberg participated in the protests against deportations of Arab workers from France. She accepted a role in a film about a gay couple from Iran.

== Personal life ==
From 1955 to 1959, Vlady was married to actor/director Robert Hossein. From 1963 to 1966, she was married to Jean-Claude Brouillet, a French entrepreneur, owner of two airlines and member of the French Resistance.

Vlady's third husband was the Soviet poet and songwriter, Vladimir Vysotsky; they were married and lived in Moscow from 1969 until his death in 1980. Vlady wrote Vladimir, or the Aborted Flight, a memoir of her relationship with Vysotsky. For a decade, the couple maintained a long-distance relationship as Vlady compromised her career in France in order to spend more time in Moscow, and his friends pulled strings for him to travel abroad. She eventually joined the Communist Party of France, which essentially gave her an unlimited-entry visa into the Soviet Union, and provided Vysotsky with some immunity against prosecution by the government. The problems of his long-distance relationship with Vlady inspired several of Vysotsky's songs.

She also lived with French oncologist Léon Schwartzenberg from 1980 until his death in 2003.

Vlady died in Ivry-sur-Seine, a suburb of Paris, on 24 September 2026, aged 88. According to a statement by her children, she died "at home, surrounded by her loved ones and her animals".

== Filmography ==
Film

Year	Title	Role
1949	Summer Storm	Marie-Tempête
1950	Due sorelle amano	
1951	Pardon My French	Jacqueline
1952	Dans la vie tout s'arrange	La petite Jacqueline
1952	Black Feathers	Gemma Vianello
1952	La figlia del diavolo	Graziella
1953	The Unfaithfuls	Marisa
1953	Finishing School	Eljay
1953	Too Young for Love	Annette
1953	Cavalcade of Song	La fanciulla amata
1953	Musoduro	Lucia Giardano
1954	Before the Deluge	Liliane Noblet
1954	She	Céline
1954	Days of Love	Angela Cafalla
1955	Sins of Casanova	Fulvia
1955	The Hotshot	Juliette
1955	Sophie and the Crime	Sophie Brulard
1955	The Wicked Go to Hell	Eva
1956	Symphony of Love	Caroline Esterhazy
1956	La Sorcière	Ina
1956	Forgive Us Our Trespasses	Dédée
1956	Crime and Punishment	Lili Marcellin
1958	Liberté Surveillée	Eva
1959	Toi, le venin	Eva Lecain
1959	The Verdict	Catherine Desroches
1959	Double Agents	Elle
1960	Les Canailles	Hélène Chalmers
1961	Girl in the Window	Else
1961	La Princesse de Clèves	La Princesse de Clèves
1962	Adorable Liar	Juliette
1962	The Seven Deadly Sins	Catherine Lartigue
1962	The Steppe	Comtesse Dranitsky
1962	Climats	Odile
1963	The Conjugal Bed	Regina
1963	Enough Rope	Ellie
1963	The Cage	Isabelle
1963	Sweet and Sour	La radio taxi girl
1963	Don't Tempt the Devil	Catherine Dupré
1965	Run for Your Wife	Nicole
1965	Chimes at Midnight	Kate Percy
1966	Atout coeur à Tokyo pour OSS 117	Eva Wilson
1966	Mona, l'étoile sans nom	Mona
1966	The Mona Lisa Has Been Stolen	Nicole
1967	Two or Three Things I Know About Her	Juliette Jeanson
1969	Time to Live	Marie
1969	Syuzhet dlya nebolshogo rasskaza	Lika
1969	Sirocco d'hiver	Maria
1970	Contestazione generale	Imma
1970	Pour un sourire	Véronique
1973	Le complot	Christine
1975	7 morts sur ordonnance	Muriel Losseray
1977	The Two of Them	Mária
1978	The Bermuda Triangle	Kim
1978	The Thief of Baghdad	Perizidah
1986	Les Exploits d'un jeune Don Juan	Madame Muller
1989	Follow Me	Ljuba
1989	Splendor	Chantal Duvivier
1992	Dreams of Russia	Catherine the Great
2010	A Few Days of Respite	Yolande

== Songs ==
- Russian Lullabies (1981) [LP], Le Chant du Monde, illustrated by Keleck
- Marina Vlady and Vladimir Vysotsky (1996) [CD], Melodiya, songs by Marina Vlady, words and music by Vladimir Vysotsky
