= Henry Chapier =

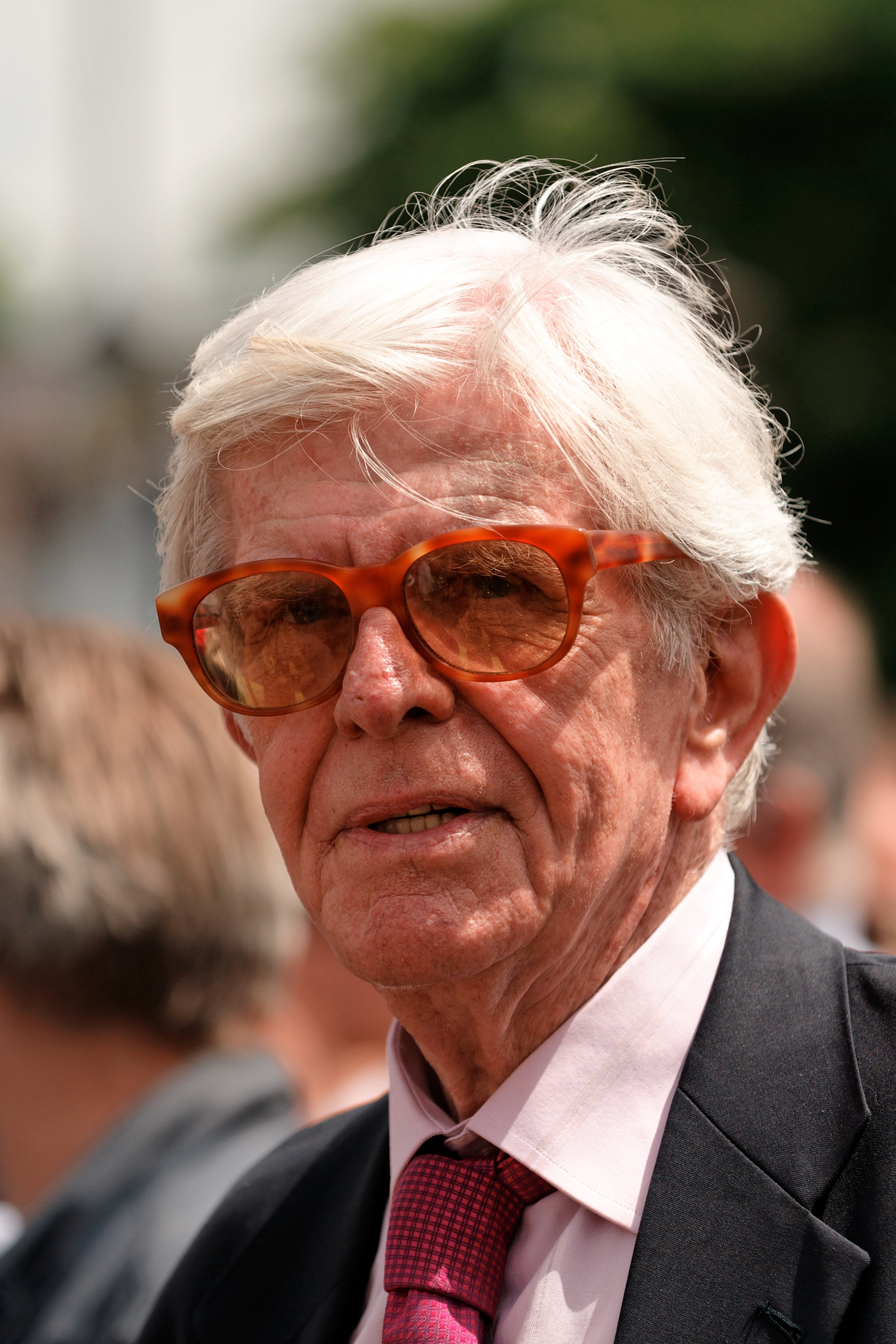
- Born: Henri Shapiro; 14 November 1933; Bucharest, Romania
- Died: 27 January 2019 (aged 85); Paris, France
- Occupations: Journalist, film critic, television presenter, film director
- Notable credit: Le Divan
- Television: France 3 (1987–94)
- Website: henry-chapier.com

Henry Chapier (14 November 1933 – 27 January 2019) was a French journalist, film critic, television presenter and feature film director.

== Biography ==
Henry Chapier was born in Bucharest, Romania, the son of an international lawyer and an actress of Austrian descent. He left Romania along with his family in 1947.

Chapier began in 1958 a career as film critic collaborating with the weekly newspaper Arts with François Truffaut. He later became a stringer at L'Express and obtained a prize as best beginner journalist in 1959. The same year he became editor-in-chief of the Culture pages of Combat and was also the film critic of that newspaper until 1974. He got involved in the 1968 controversy over the dismissal of Henri Langlois from the Cinémathèque Française.

At the 1970 San Sebastián International Film Festival, his first film Sex Power won the Silver Shell award for best direction, from a jury that Chapier remembers was presided by Fritz Lang. In 1973, he directed the "semi-experimental" film Amore, with a score by Vangelis Papathanassiou and a screenplay ostensibly by Paul Morrissey & Andy Warhol.

In April 1974, Philippe Tesson created Le Quotidien de Paris and Henry Chapier was the editor-in-chief of the Culture pages. Chapier joined FR3 in 1978 as a film and cultural editorialist. In 1981, he is one of the three editors-in-chief of Soir 3. He later created the television program Le Divan which he hosted from 1987 to 1994. He left France 3 that year and became president of the Maison européenne de la photographie in 1996. The same year, he was a member of the jury at the Cannes Film Festival after being a member of the jury at the Caméra d'Or in 1988.

Chapier died in his sleep at home in the early hours of Sunday 27 January 2019.

== Honours ==
- Commandeur (Commander) of the Ordre national du Mérite
- Officier (Officer) of the Légion d'Honneur
