= Hélène Vallier =

French actress (1932–1988)

- Born: Militza de Poliakoff-Baïdaroff; 2 February 1932; Paris, France
- Died: 1 August 1988 (aged 56); Marseille, France
- Occupation: Actress
- Years active: 1952–1986 (film & television)
- Relatives: Marina Vlady (sister); Odile Versois (sister)

Hélène Vallier (born Militza de Poliakoff-Baïdaroff; 2 February 1932 – 1 August 1988) was a French film, stage and television actress.

She was born Paris to an exiled White Russian family, and was the sister of actresses Odile Versois and Marina Vlady. In 1966, they appeared together in a production of Three Sisters at the Théâtre Hébertot in Paris.

== Selected filmography ==
- Black Feathers (1952)
- Rome 11:00 (1952)
- Saadia (1953)
- Rasputin (1954)
- The Hotshot (1955)
- Forgive Us Our Trespasses (1956)
- Dialogue of the Carmelites (1960)
- Beau Masque (1972)
- Hail the Artist (1973)
- Chanel Solitaire (1981)
- Nazi Hunter: The Beate Klarsfeld Story (1986)

== Bibliography ==
- Biggs, Melissa E. French films, 1945-1993: a critical filmography of the 400 most important releases. McFarland & Company, 1996.
- Marill, Alvin H. Movies Made for Television: The Telefeature and the Mini-series, 1964-1986. New York, Zoetrope, 1987.
