= Robert Hossein =

French film actor (1927–2020)

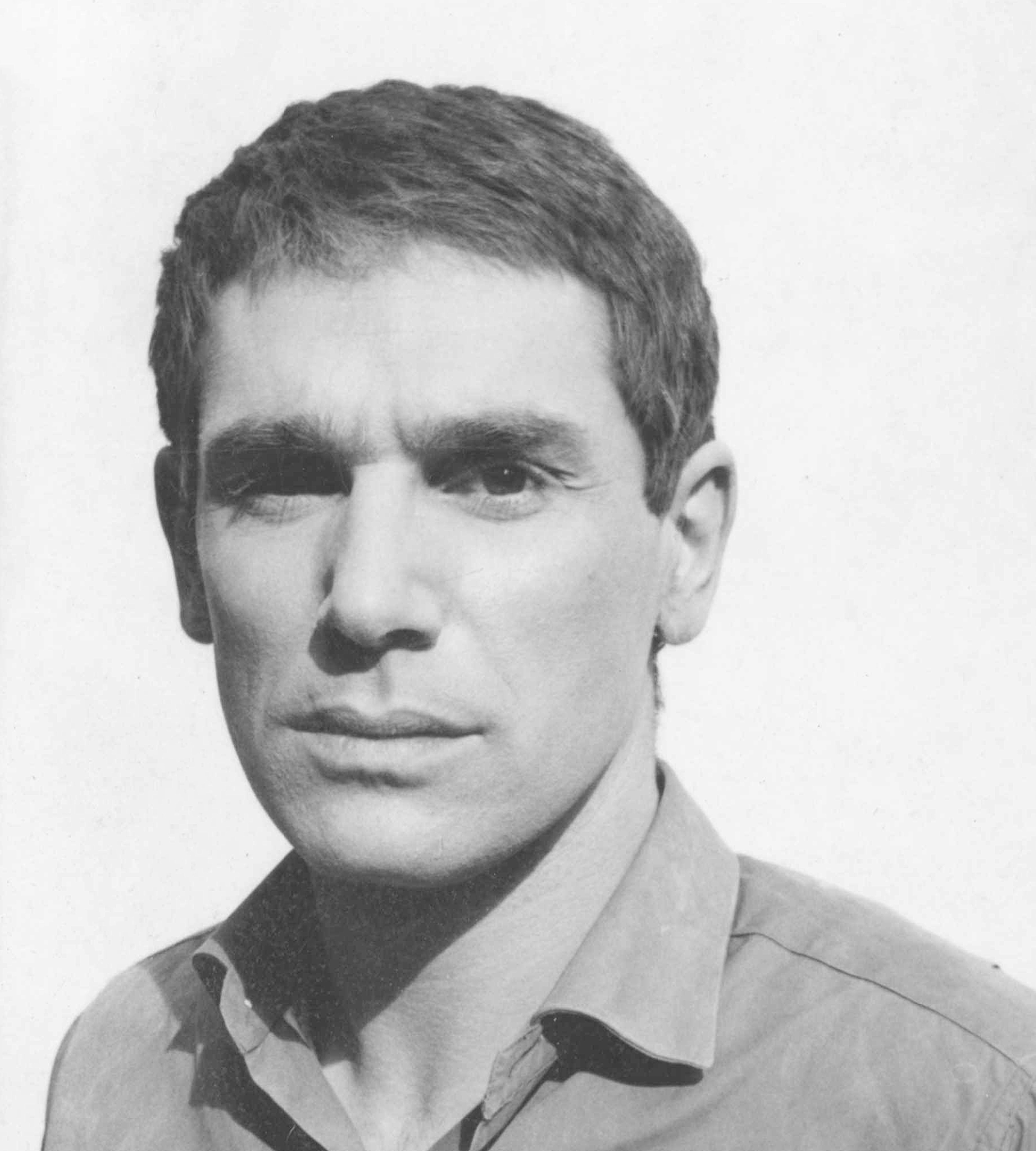
- Hossein in 1960 publicity photo
- Born: 30 December 1927; Paris, France
- Died: 31 December 2020 (aged 93); Essey-lès-Nancy, France
- Occupations: Actor, film director
- Years active: 1948–2019
- Spouses: Marina Vlady (m. 1955; div. 1960) Caroline Eliacheff (m. 1962; div. 1964) Candice Patou (m. 1976)
- Children: 4

Robert Hossein (30 December 1927 – 31 December 2020) was a French film actor, director, and writer. He directed the 1982 adaptation of Les Misérables and appeared in Vice and Virtue, Le Casse, Les Uns et les Autres and Venus Beauty Institute. His other roles include Michèle Mercier's husband in the Angélique series, a gunfighter in the Spaghetti Western Cemetery Without Crosses (which he also directed and co-wrote), and a Catholic priest who falls in love with Claude Jade and becomes a communist in Forbidden Priests.

== Cinematic career ==
Hossein started directing films in 1955 with Les Salauds vont en enfer, from a play by Frédéric Dard whose work he later adapted several times on screen. Right from the start Hossein established his characteristic trademarks: using a seemingly straightforward suspense plot and subverting its conventions (sometimes to the extent of a complete disregard of the traditional demand for a final twist or revelation) in order to concentrate on ritualistic relationships. This is the director's running preoccupation which is always stressed in his films by an extraordinary command of film space and often striking frame compositions where the geometry of human figures and set design is used to accentuate the psychological set-up of the scene. The mechanisms of guilt and the way it destroys relationships is another recurring theme, presumably influenced by Hossein's lifelong interest in the works of Dostoyevsky.

In 1967, he was a member of the jury of the 5th Moscow International Film Festival. His 1982 film Les Misérables was entered into the 13th Moscow International Film Festival where it won a Special Prize.

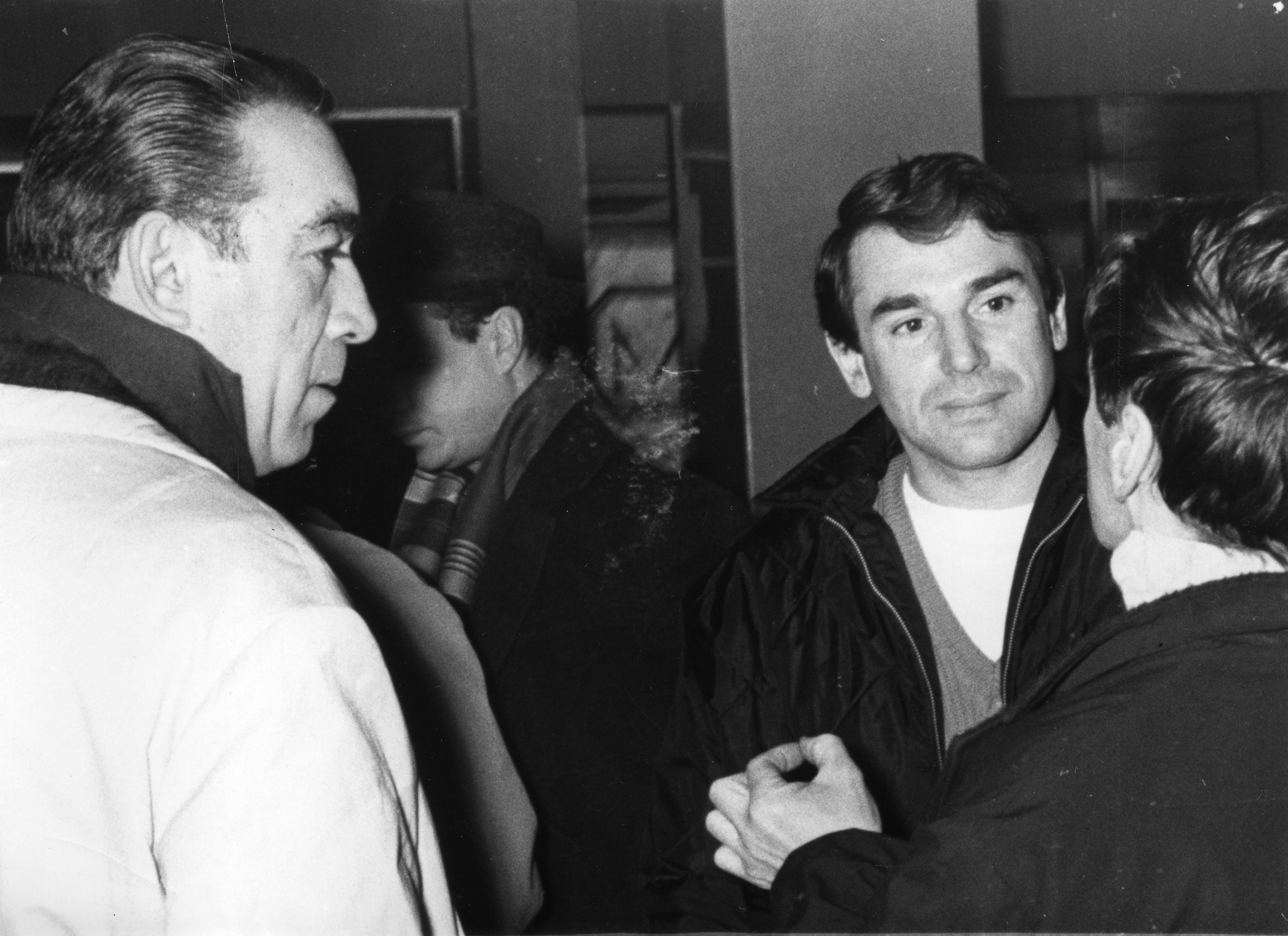
Hossein with Anthony Quinn in Belgrade in 1969.

Although Hossein had some modest international successes with films like Toi, le venin and The Vampire of Düsseldorf, he was much singled out for scorching criticism by the critics and followers of the New Wave for the unashamedly melodramatic frameworks of his films. The fact that he was essentially an auteur director with a consistent set of themes and an extraordinary mastery of original and unusual approaches to staging his stories, was never appreciated. He was not averse to trying his hand at widely different genres and was never defeated, making the strikingly different Spaghetti Western Cemetery Without Crosses and the low-budgeted but daringly subversive period drama I Killed Rasputin. However, because of the lack of wider success and continuing adverse criticism, Hossein virtually ended his film directing career in 1970, having concentrated on theatre where his achievements were never questioned, and subsequently returning to film directing only twice. With two or three exceptions, his films remain commercially unavailable and very difficult to see.

== Personal life ==
Robert Hossein's grandfather was born in Iran. His father was André Hossein, a composer of Iranian Azerbaijani origin, and his mother was Anna Mincovschi (1904–1998), a Jewish comedy actress, born in Kyiv, who moved to Paris with her family in 1920s from Soroca (Bessarabia). He was married three times: first to Marina Vlady (then Marina Poliakoff; on 23 December 1955, they had two sons, Pierre and Igor), later on 7 June 1962, to Caroline Eliacheff, daughter of Françoise Giroud (they had a son, Nicholas, who became rabbi Aaron Eliacheff). She was fifteen at the time and he was 34. In 1973, he dated for a short while Michèle Watrin, before she died the following year in a car accident. In 1976, he married actress Candice Patou, with whom he had a son.

=== Religion ===
In 1971, Hossein was baptized in the Roman Catholic Church. According to an article written by Emannuel Peze, Hossein experienced a conversion to Catholicism in 1971 during a visit to the Marian apparition at San Damiano in Lombard, Italy.

In 2007, he presented a play entitled Do Not Be Afraid (N'ayez pas peur), about the life of Pope John Paul II. He had a special devotion to Saint Therese of Lisieux.

== Death ==
Hossein died of COVID-19 on 31 December 2020, one day after his 93rd birthday, during the COVID-19 pandemic in France.

== Selected filmography ==
Year	Title	Role	Director
1948	The Lame Devil	a guest	Sacha Guitry
1948	To the Eyes of Memory	uncredited	Jean Delannoy
1954	Quay of Blondes	Chemise rose	Paul Cadéac
1955	The Infiltrator	Jo	Pierre Foucaud
1955	Rififi	Rémy Grutter	Jules Dassin
1955	The Wicked Go to Hell	Fred	Robert Hossein
1956	Crime and Punishment	René Brunel	Georges Lampin
1957	No Sun in Venice (Sait-on jamais...)	Sforzi	Roger Vadim
1957	Méfiez-vous fillettes	Raven	Yves Allégret
1959	Toi, le venin	Pierre Menda	Robert Hossein
1959	The Road to Shame	Pierre Rossi	Édouard Molinaro
1959	Du rififi chez les femmes	Marcel Point-Bleu	Alex Joffé
1959	The Verdict	Georges Lagrange	Jean Valère
1959	Double Agents	Lui	Robert Hossein
1960	Riff-Raff	Ed Dawson	Maurice Labro
1960	Les Scélérats	Jess Rooland	Robert Hossein
1961	La Menace	Savary	Gérard Oury
1961	Madame Sans-Gêne	François-Joseph Lefebvre	Christian-Jaque
1962	Girl on the Road	Edouard	Jacqueline Audry
1962	Le Repos du guerrier	Renaud Sarti	Roger Vadim
1963	Le Meurtrier	Inspecteur Corby	Claude Autant-Lara
1963	Vice and Virtue	Schorndorf	Roger Vadim
1963	Chair de poule	Daniel Boisset	Julien Duvivier
1964	Banco à Bangkok pour OSS 117	Dr Sinn	André Hunebelle
1964	Les Yeux cernés	Franz	Robert Hossein himself
1964	Angélique, Marquise des Anges	Jeoffrey de Peyrac	Bernard Borderie
1965	The Vampire of Düsseldorf	Peter Kürten	Robert Hossein himself
1965	The Dirty Game	Dupont	Christian-Jaque and others
1965	Marco the Magnificent	Prince Nayam	Denys de La Patellière and Noël Howard
1965	God's Thunder	Marcel	Denys de La Patellière
1966	Madamigella di Maupin	Capitain Alcibiade	Mauro Bolognini
1966	Angelique and the King	Jeoffrey de Peyrac	Bernard Borderie
1966	The Second Twin	Pierre Montaud, the Advocate	Christian-Jaque
1966	Brigade antigangs	Inspector Le Goff	Bernard Borderie
1966	La Longue Marche	Carnot	Alexandre Astruc
1967	I Killed Rasputin	Serge Hukhotin	Robert Hossein himself
1967	Lamiel	Valber	Jean Aurel
1967	Untamable Angelique	Jeoffrey de Peyrac	Bernard Borderie
1968	Angelique and the Sultan	Jeoffrey de Peyrac	Bernard Borderie
1968	The Private Lesson	Enrico Fontana	Michel Boisrond
1968	A Little Virtuous	Louis Brady	Serge Korber
1969	The Battle of El Alamein	Erwin Rommel	Giorgio Ferroni
1969	Cemetery Without Crosses	Manuel	Robert Hossein himself
1969	Life Love Death	as himself	Claude Lelouch
1969	The Scarlet Lady	Julien Auchard	Jean Valère
1969	Nell'anno del Signore	Leonida Montanari	Luigi Magni
1970	Le Temps des loups	"Dillinger"	Sergio Gobbi
1970	Point de chute	the boss	Robert Hossein himself
1971	La Part des lions	Maurice Ménard	Jean Larriaga
1971	The Burglars	Ralph	Henri Verneuil
1972	Un meurtre est un meurtre	Jean Carouse	Étienne Périer
1973	Don Juan, or If Don Juan Were a Woman	Louis Prévost	Roger Vadim
1973	Forbidden Priests	Jean Rastaud	Denys de La Patellière
1981	Les Uns et les Autres	Simon Meyer / Robert Prat	Claude Lelouch
1981	Le Professionnel	Inspector Rosen	Georges Lautner
1982	Le Grand Pardon	Manuel Carreras	Alexandre Arcady
1982	Les Misérables	not credited as actor	Robert Hossein himself
1986	A Man and a Woman: 20 Years Later	as himself	Claude Lelouch
1995	Les Misérables	the master of ceremonies	Claude Lelouch
1997	Wax Mask	Boris Volkoff	Sergio Stivaletti
1999	Venus Beauty Institute	the pilot	Tonie Marshall
2004	San-Antonio	Minister of the Interior	Frédéric Auburtin
2006	Trivial	Antoine Bérangère	Sophie Marceau
2009	A Man and His Dog	cameo appearance	Francis Huster

== Honours ==
- France
- Commander of the Légion d'honneur, 2005
- Grand officer of the Ordre National du Mérite
- Commander of the Ordre des Arts et des Lettres

=== Foreign honours ===
- Monaco
- Commander of the Order of Cultural Merit (2006)

Member of Eurasian Academy (2016).
