= Odile Versois =

French actress (1930–1980)

- Versois in 1955
- Born: Étiennette de Poliakoff-Baydaroff; 15 June 1930; Paris, France
- Died: 23 June 1980 (aged 50); Paris, France
- Occupation: Actress
- Years active: 1948–1980
- Spouse(s): Jacques Dacqmine (divorced) François Pozzo di Borgo (divorced)
- Children: 4
- Relatives: Marina Vlady (sister); Hélène Vallier (sister)

Odile Versois (born Étiennette de Poliakoff-Baydaroff; 15 June 1930 – 23 June 1980) was a French actress who appeared in 47 film and television productions between 1948 and 1980. Versois was the sister of actresses Marina Vlady, Hélène Vallier and Olga Baïdar-Poliakoff. Their father, Vladimir, was a noted opera singer of Russian descent, and their mother, Militza Envald Voropanoff, was a dancer. Born in Paris, she began acting as a child and for a while pursued a ballet career.

She made a number of films for the Rank Organisation in Britain.

== Personal life ==
Versois married actor Jacques René Dacqmine (1923–2010; The Queen's Necklace) in 1951 but the couple divorced a year later. She had four children by her second husband, Comte François Reynier Ambroise Henri Pozzo di Borgo, whom she married in 1953 but also divorced. She died in 1980 in Paris of cancer shortly after her 50th birthday.

== Filmography ==
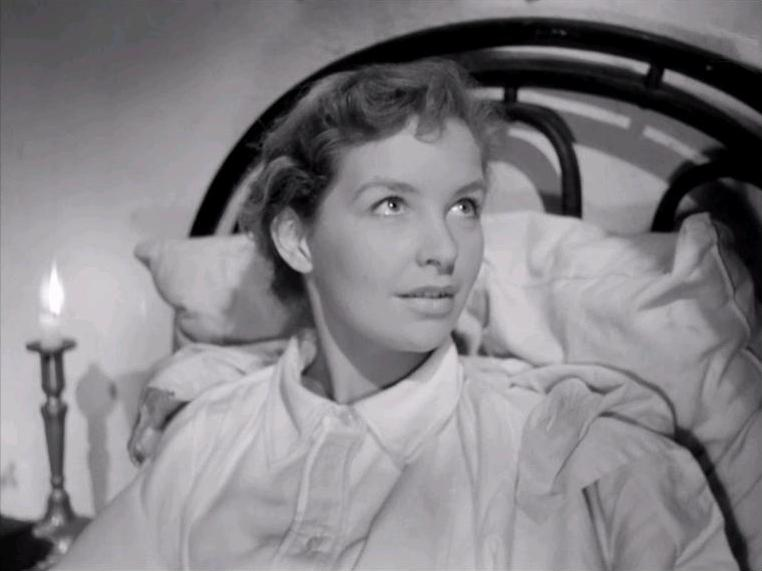
Versois in The Bride Can't Wait (1949)

Year	Title	Role	Notes
1948	The Last Vacation	Juliette Lherminier	
1949	Fantomas Against Fantomas	La jeune fille	
1949	The Bride Can't Wait	Maria	
1949	Summer Storm	Marie-Lou	
1950	Paolo e Francesca	Francesca da Rimini	
1950	Old Boys of Saint-Loup	Catherine Jacquelin	
1950	Mademoiselle Josette, My Woman	Josette Dupré	
1950	Into the Blue	Jackie	
1951	Beautiful Love	Helga Jorgensen	
1952	Domenica	Domenica Léandri	
1952	Grand Gala	Anna	
1952	La répétition manquée		
1953	Mina de Vanghel	Mina de Vanghel	
1953	A Day to Remember	Martine Berthier	
1953	Les crimes de l'amour	Mina de Vanghel	(segment 1 : 'Mina de Vanghel')
1954	The Young Lovers	Anna Szobek	
1955	To Paris with Love	Lizette Marconne	
1955	Sophie et le Crime		Uncredited
1956	Les Insoumises	Hélène	
1956	Checkpoint	Francesca	
1956	Michel Strogoff		
1957	King in Shadow	Queen Mathilde	
1958	Passport to Shame	Marie Louise 'Malou' Beaucaire	
1959	Toi, le venin	Hélène Lecain	
1960	La dragée haute	Evelyne Barsac	
1961	El secreto de los hombres azules	Suzanne	
1961	Rendezvous	Edith	
1962	Cartouche	Isabelle de Ferrussac	
1962	Where the Truth Lies	Nathalie	
1963	Because, Because of a Woman	Nathalie	
1963	Transit à Saïgon	Nicole	
1964	Le dernier tiercé	Jacqueline	
1968	Benjamin	La conseillère	
1972	Églantine	Marguerite	
1976	Stationschef Fallmerayer	Anna Walewska	
1977	Le Crabe-tambour	Madame	
1980	Julien Fontanes, magistrat	Inge Wolfrum	Episode: "Les mauvais chiens", (final appearance)
