= Bianco e Nero =

Bimonthly Italian film magazine

- Cover of Bianco e Nero featuring actor Vittorio Gassman.
- Categories: Film magazine
- Frequency: Bimonthly
- Founded: 1937
- First issue: January 1937
- Country: Italy
- Based in: Rome
- Language: Italian
- OCLC: 191715058

Bianco e Nero (Italian: Black and White) is an Italian film journal. It is the oldest film publication in Italy.

== History and profile ==
Bianco e Nero was founded in 1937 by Luigi Chiarini as the official organ of the drama school Centro Sperimentale di Cinematografia. Its first issue appeared in January that year. Bianco e Nero was the official media outlet of the Centro Sperimentale della Cinematografia in Cinecittà based in Rome.

Bianco e Nero was started as a monthly journal, and its contents included reviews and essays on film pedagogy and theory. Its first director was Luigi Freddi. Since 1939, the magazine also published a series of special monographic books on history, form and technique of cinema. It temporarily ceased publication between 1944 and 1946 because of World War II and resumed in 1947. In 1999 the journal changed its title orthography to Bianco & Nero and became a bimonthly. The magazine is published by the University of Rome Press.

The Spanish film magazine Objetivo was modeled on Bianca e Nero.

== See also ==
- List of film periodicals
- List of magazines in Italy
