= Michelle David =

American singer and television presenter

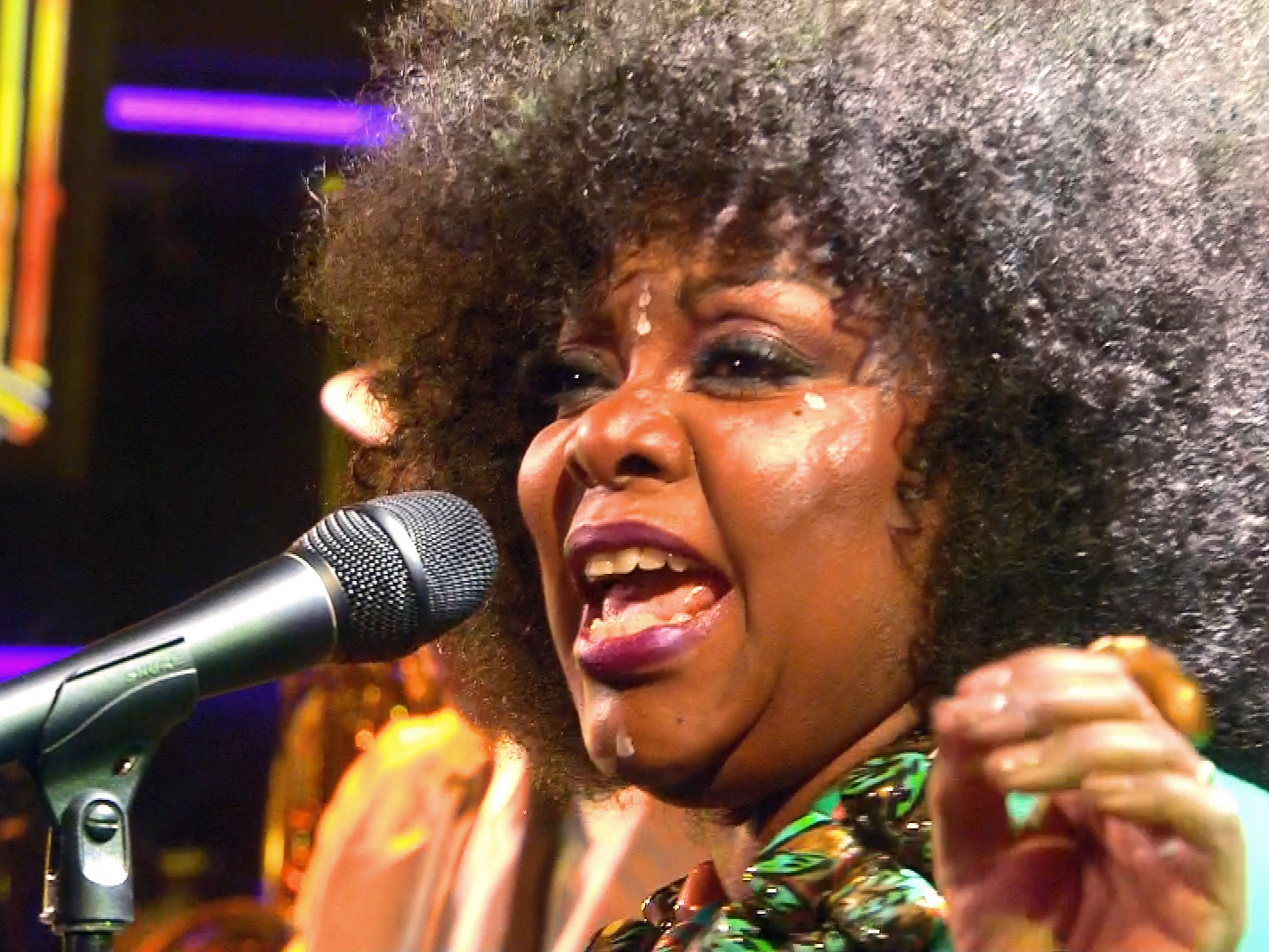

Background information
- Born: Michelle Teri Robin Douthit; August 28, 1966 (age 59); Winston-Salem, North Carolina, U.S.
- Origin: New York City, U.S.
- Genres: Pop, gospel, soul
- Years active: 1994–present
- Website: www.michelle-david.com

Michelle David (born August 28, 1966) is an American singer and television presenter based in the Netherlands. She has been active since 1994 and she is best known as the lead vocalist of Michelle David & The Gospel Sessions and later Michelle David & The True Tones, groups blending gospel, soul, and R&B.

== Biography ==
When David was ten months old, she moved with her mother to New York City. Raised in the church, she began singing at the age of four and joined her first group, The Mission of Love, at age five.

In 1980 she enrolled at the "Fame" school in New York (the Fiorello H. LaGuardia High School). During this period she contributed to the film Ghostbusters. After graduating she began studying medicine. In 1991 she auditioned for the Broadway musical Mama, I Want to Sing. In 1992 she toured internationally with the musical and then spent two years in Germany as a member of The Golden Gospel Singers.

In 1994 David moved to the Netherlands to work with Stardust Theatre Productions. Her first show there was The Sound of Motown, followed by Glory of Gospel and Mahalia. During these productions she portrayed a gospel singer in the film Abeltje and released a CD single titled "No One's Gonna Love You".

Upon returning to the United States she provided backing vocals for Diana Ross and Michael Bolton and served as choreographer for the show Black Nativity. She later returned to Germany and from 2000 spent two seasons in the production R.E.S.P.E.C.T..

In 2002 she declined the role of Shenzi in the German production of The Lion King to join the vocal group Big, Black & Beautiful. For SALTO Omroep Amsterdam she hosted both a radio and a television program titled Inspirational Grooves. She has also been a member of the gospel formation Salt.

David has been the subject of substantial features in the Dutch national press. In 2020, De Volkskrant ran a long profile on her life, health and artistic rebirth around a new album and tour, and in 2025 Het Parool published an in-depth profile describing her as "the best soul singer on Dutch soil."

In 2021 David was introduced to a UK audience on the BBC Radio 6 Craig Charles Funk and Soul Show. Charles described her as "a lady who has done more than most to re-invent and reinvigorate the gospel scene," noting her background at the New York Fame School, an appearance in Ghostbusters, and early work as a backing singer for Diana Ross.

She has also been the subject of international interviews. In June 2024, Radio France Internationale (RFI) featured David on its national program Épopée des Musiques Noires, where she discussed her vision of music as a force for universal fraternity and community beyond genre boundaries.

=== Brothers and Sisters (2024) and transition to the True-Tones ===
From 2015 to 2020, David recorded four albums with Michelle David & The Gospel Sessions, a collaboration noted for its raw, spiritual reinterpretation of traditional gospel. In 2022 she and her bandmates reshaped their sound and adopted a new name, Michelle David & The True Tones, signaling a broader embrace of soul, rhythm and blues, and contemporary influences.

Their first widely distributed studio album as the True-Tones, Brothers & Sisters (Record Kicks, April 2024), blends classic soul, upbeat R&B and gospel impulses with in-the-pocket grooves and David's powerful vocals; it was positively received by international outlets. The album was highlighted for its message of unity and its retro-soul aesthetic, with critics drawing lines to Curtis Mayfield, the Supremes and James Brown. Earlier in her career, The Gospel Sessions Vol. 3 (2018) received an Edison Jazzism public prize nomination and helped establish her profile beyond the Netherlands.

David lives with her husband, Donald, near Amsterdam. They have three children. In 2023, Michelle David & The True Tones toured a theatre show titled The Untold Stories.

== Discography ==
=== Albums ===
- New Generation (EP)
- Big, Black & Beautiful – A Tribute to the Girl Groups (2003), with Rocq-E Harrell and Lucretia van der Vloot
- Big, Black & Beautiful XL (2006), with Rocq-E Harrell and Lucretia van der Vloot
- Everything's Changing (2009), with Rocq-E Harrell and Lucretia van der Vloot
- The Gospel Sessions Vol. 1 (2015), by Michelle David & The Gospel Sessions
- The Gospel Sessions Vol. 2 (2016), by Michelle David & The Gospel Sessions
- The Gospel Sessions Vol. 3 (2018), by Michelle David & The Gospel Sessions
- The Gospel Sessions Vol. 4 (2020), by Michelle David & The Gospel Sessions
- Truth & Soul (2022), by Michelle David & The True Tones
- Brothers & Sisters (2024), by Michelle David & The True Tones
