= André Hossein =

French composer (1905–1983)

André Aminollah Hossein
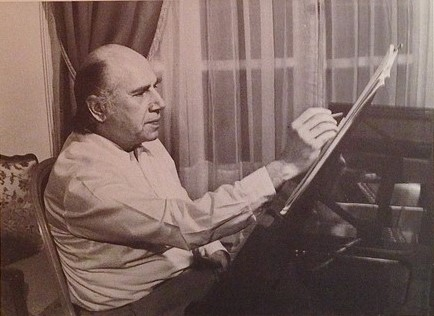
- Aminollah Hossein – «Arya» Symphony

Background information
- Born: Aminollah Hosseinof (امین‌الله حسینف); February 2, 1905; Ashgabat, Russian Empire
- Died: August 9, 1983 (aged 78) Paris, France
- Genres: Symphonic music, Persian music, Film score
- Occupations: Composer, Conductor, Pianist
- Instruments: Piano, Tar (string_instrument)
- Years active: 1930–1983

André Aminollah Hossein, born Aminulla Huseynov, also known as Aminollah Hossein (Persian: امین‌الله حسین; Russian: Аминулла Гусейнов; 1905, Samarkand – 9 August 1983, Paris) was a French composer of Iranian Azerbaijani origin and a tar soloist.

Hossein is regarded as one of the first 20th-century composers to integrate traditional Persian musical modes into Western symphonic structure. He belonged to the generation of émigré intellectuals who bridged Eastern and European artistic traditions in the interwar years. After his academic formation in Russia and Germany, he settled permanently in France, where he became a respected composer, conductor, and pianist. His works, such as Symphony of Persepolis and Rhapsodie Persane, demonstrate an interest in reviving ancient Persian mythological and spiritual themes through modern orchestral language. Critics often compared his music to that of Alexander Borodin and Nikolai Rimsky-Korsakov for its use of Oriental colors and narrative tone. A versatile artist, Hossein also wrote ballets, concertos, and film scores, some in collaboration with his son Robert Hossein, a leading French actor-director. Throughout his career, he defended the idea of a “universal Orientalism” — a dialogue between Zoroastrian mysticism, Persian poetry, and European romanticism. His compositions were performed by orchestras in Paris, Monte-Carlo, and Tehran, and broadcast by Radio France in the 1960s and 1970s. Hossein’s legacy, though lesser known internationally, remains a cornerstone in the evolution of Persian symphonic music. He is buried in Paris, where his musical archives and manuscripts continue to be studied by researchers of intercultural composition.

== Life and education ==
According to his son, Robert Hossein, André Hossein studied in Moscow, Russia, and later in Germany, where he attended a music academy in Stuttgart and the Berlin Conservatory from 1934 to 1937. His fascination with ancient Persia led him to convert to Zoroastrianism, a spiritual shift that deeply influenced his later works, including Persian Miniature, I Love My Country, and Symphony Persepolis.

He married Anna Mincovschi, a Jewish comedy actress from Soroca (Bessarabia), who had immigrated to Paris with her parents after the October Revolution.

Hossein later studied privately with Paul Antoine Vidal at the Conservatoire de Paris and spent the rest of his life in France.

== Works ==
André Hossein’s musical career blended Western symphonic form with Persian modal traditions, creating a unique fusion between French orchestral color and Iranian melodic structure.

In 1935, Hossein composed his first ballet, Towards the Light, followed by several piano works including études and miniatures that combined impressionist harmonies with Eastern motifs. His attachment to his native Persia is particularly evident in major symphonic compositions such as The Symphony of Persepolis (also known as The Rubble of the Forgotten Empire, completed in 1947) and the Symphony on Khayyam, inspired by the poetry of Omar Khayyam (1951).

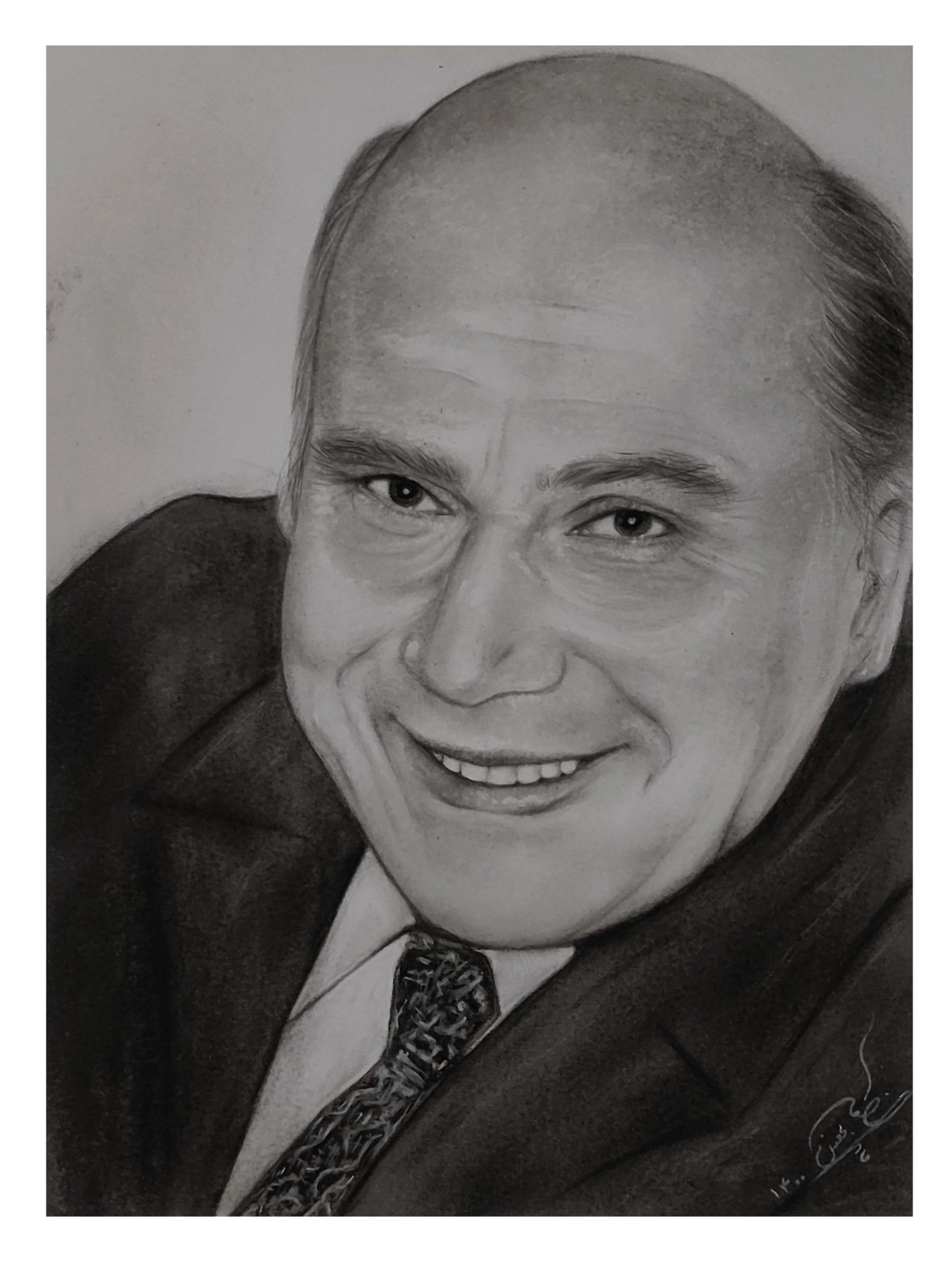
Portrait of André Hossein by Darya Shahbazi (30 January 2022)

Among his most notable works are three piano concertos, Persian Miniature, Scheherazade (Shahrzad), and Arya Symphony. Hossein also composed several film scores, notably for films directed by his son Robert Hossein, in which his lyrical orchestration and Persian melodic sense served dramatic storytelling.

His symphonic poems and concertos were performed and recorded by major orchestras including the Orchestre National de l'Opéra de Paris (conducted by Jean-Claude Hartemann), the Orchestre National de l'Opéra de Monte-Carlo (conducted by Pierre Dervaux), and the Nuremberg Symphony Orchestra (conducted by Ali Rahbari), under the series Symphonic Poems from Persia, supported by the Ministry of Culture and Art in Tehran during the late 1970s.

== Works by category ==
André Hossein’s musical catalogue includes symphonies, concertos, ballets, and numerous film scores that reveal his synthesis of Persian modal inspiration with Western symphonic form.

=== Orchestral ===
- Symphony of the Sands (Symphonie des sables, 1946)
- Symphony of Persepolis (Symphonie Persépolis, 1947)
- Arya Symphony (Symphonie Arya, 1976)

=== Concertos ===
- Piano Concerto No. 1 ("Capriccio", 1946)
- Piano Concerto No. 2 (1946)
- Piano Concerto No. 3 ("Quasi una fantasia")

=== Ballets ===
- Towards the Light (Vers la lumière, 1935)
- Iranian Miniatures (Miniatures iraniennes, 1975)
- Scheherazade (Shéhérazade, 1975)
- Dance of Esmeralda (Danse d’Esmeralda, 1980)
- Holiday on Ice (Vacances sur glace, 1982)

=== Film scores ===
Hossein composed numerous film scores, several for productions directed by his son Robert Hossein, the French actor and filmmaker. Among his best-known works:

- Forgive Us Our Trespasses (Pardonnez nos offenses, dir. Robert Hossein, 1956)
- The Song of the World (Le Chant du monde, dir. Marcel Camus, 1965)
- A Young Couple (Un jeune couple, dir. René Gainville, 1969)
- Summer of ’42 (Un été 42, dir. Robert Mulligan, 1971)
- Les Misérables (dir. Robert Hossein, 1982 – short version)

=== Recordings and releases ===
- The fantasy Almería composed (La fantaisie Almería, Barclay Records, ref. 79 021, France)
