= How to Keep the Red Lamp Burning =

- Directed by: Gilles Grangier; Georges Lautner
- Written by: Albert Simonin; Michel Audiard; Albert Kantof
- Produced by: Robert Dorfmann et al
- Starring: Louis de Funès; Bernard Blier
- Cinematography: Maurice Fellous; Robert Lefebvre
- Edited by: Jacqueline Thiédot
- Music by: Michel Magne
- Distributed by: Valoria Films
- Release date: 28 October 1965 (France)
- Running time: 100 minutes
- Countries: France; Italy
- Language: French
- Box office: $10.4 million

How to Keep the Red Lamp Burning (French: Les Bons Vivants, lit. 'High Lifers', also known as Un grand seigneur) is a French comedy film from 1965, directed by Gilles Grangier and Georges Lautner, that was written by Albert Simonin and Michel Audiard. It stars Bernard Blier, Mireille Darc, Andréa Parisy, Bernadette Lafont, and Louis de Funès.

== Plot and Cast ==
The story is told in three separate chapters.

=== Chapter 1: The Closure ===
In Paris in 1946, when a new law closes all brothels, an owner has to dismiss his girls and dispose of the premises and their contents. He and his wife distribute parting gifts to the girls, including Héloïse. but one is away at a family bereavement. This is Lucette, for whom is reserved the red lantern that hung over the front door.

- Bernard Blier as Monsieur Charles, the owner of the brothel
- Dominique Davray as Madame Blanche, the madame
- Franck Villard as Monsieur Marcel, owner of another brothel
- Mireille Darc as Héloïse, one of the girls

=== Chapter 2: The Trial ===
Two incompetent burglars break into the mansion of a baron and flee when disturbed, abandoning most of their loot. One is caught and put on trial, while the other got away with only a red lantern. In her testimony the baroness, formerly Lucette, charms the whole court as she says it was her most treasured possession.

- Andréa Parisy as the Baroness, formerly Lucette
- Jean Lefebvre as Léonard, burglar on trial
- Jean Carmet as Paulo, burglar's accomplice
- Pierre Bertin as presiding judge
- Bernard Blier as Monsieur Charles
- Franck Villard as Monsieur Marcel

=== Chapter 3: Men of Good Taste ===
Walking home late one night from the private athletic club where the leading citizens of a little town keep fit., the bachelor Léon sees a plain-clothes policeman harassing Héloïse, a homeless young woman. Rescuing her, Léon offers her his dead mother's bedroom, upon which his housekeeper leaves in disgust. He is due to host the annual dinner of the club, so Héloïse recruits Sophie, a fellow worker, to cook and serve. The club members are so delighted by the food and the attentive waitresses that they resolve to hold dinners there more often. Héloïse recruits more girls to cope with the increased demand for their services. At Christmas, Leon gives Héloïse a special present he has found - a red lantern to hang over the front door.

- Louis de Funès as Léon
- Mireille Darc as Héloïse
- Jean Richard as Paul, club member
- Bernadette Lafont as Sophie
