= Henri Cogan =

French actor and stuntman (1914–2003)

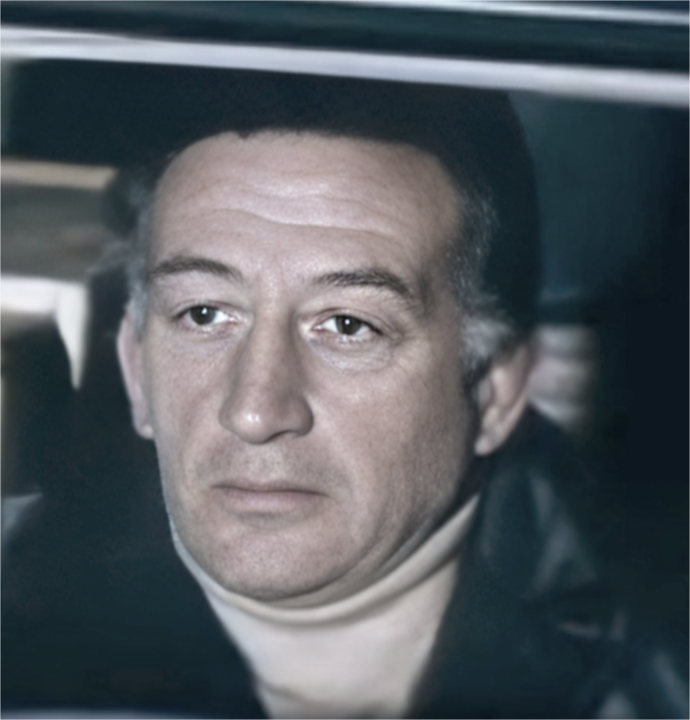
Henri Cogan

Henri Cogan (13 September 1914 in Paris – 23 September 2003 in Boulogne-Billancourt) was a French actor and stuntman.

== Biography ==
Before Henri Cogan became a fight choreographer for European action films, he proved his expertise in hand-to-hand combat publicly by fighting as a professional wrestler. As a wrestler, he once fought Lino Ventura and later introduced him to Georges Lautner. Henri Cogan appeared in French, German, and English films.

== Selected filmography ==
- 1947: A Cop (by Maurice de Canonge) - Un homme de Zattore
- 1953: La môme vert-de-gris (by Bernard Borderie) - Un copain de l'électricien (uncredited)
- 1954: Yours Truly, Blake (by Bernard Borderie) - Sam
- 1955: Les Chiffonniers d'Emmaüs (by Robert Darène) - Le bagarreur (uncredited)
- 1955: Ça va barder (by John Berry) - (uncredited)
- 1955: Pas de pitié pour les caves (by John Berry)
- 1956: Goubbiah, mon amour (by Robert Darène) - The Scarface
- 1956: The Whole Town Accuses (by Claude Boissol) - Un gangster
- 1956: L'Homme et l'Enfant (by Raoul André)
- 1957: Burning Fuse (by Henri Decoin) - Matt
- 1957: Le Grand Bluff (by Patrice Dally) - a gambler
- 1957: Méfiez-vous fillettes (by Yves Allégret) - Un homme de main de Palmer (uncredited)
- 1957: Send a Woman When the Devil Fails (by Yves Allégret) - Alberti
- 1957: Une Parisienne (by Michel Boisrond) - Un bagarreur
- 1957: Les Truands (by Carlo Rim) - Un cow-boy au saloon (uncredited)
- 1957: Incognito (by Patrice Dally)
- 1958: The Amorous Corporal (by Robert Darène) - Tom Wright
- 1958: Peter Voss, Thief of Millions (by Wolfgang Becker) - Otto
- 1959: Ça n'arrive qu'aux vivants (by Tony Saytor) - Michel
- 1959: Bobby Dodd greift ein (by Géza von Cziffra)
- 1959: Paradise for Sailors (by Harald Reinl) - Matrose Joe
- 1960: Marche ou crève (by Georges Lautner) - Kasger
- 1960: Women Are Like That (by Bernard Borderie) - Zucco
- 1960: Jack of Spades (by Yves Allégret) - Un guardian
- 1960: Me faire ça à moi (by Pierre Grimblat) - Grognon
- 1961: The Three Musketeers (by Bernard Borderie) - Mousqueton
- 1961: En plein cirage (by Georges Lautner) - Un truand
- 1962: Lemmy pour les dames - Réglege des Bagarres
- 1962: Le Chevalier de Pardaillan (by Bernard Borderie) - Le meunier
- 1962: L'Œil du monocle (by Georges Lautner) - Archiloque
- 1963: Tela de araña (by José Luis Monter)
- 1963: À toi de faire... mignonne (by Bernard Borderie) - Pierrot
- 1963: Les Tontons flingueurs (by Georges Lautner) - Freddy
- 1964: Hardi Pardaillan! (by Bernard Borderie)
- 1964: That Man in Istanbul (by Antonio Isasi-Isasmendi) - Cogan
- 1964: Angélique marquise des anges (by Bernard Borderie) - Cul-de-Bois
- 1964: The Gorillas (by Jean Girault) - (uncredited)
- 1965: Marvelous Angelique (by Bernard Borderie) - Cul-de-Bois
- 1965: Agent 3S3: Passport to Hell (Agente 3 S 3 passaporto per inferno) (by Sergio Sollima) - Sanz
- 1965: The Liquidator (by Jack Cardiff) - Yakov
- 1965: Manhattan Night of Murder (by Harald Philipp) - Bruce
- 1965: Nick Carter and Red Club (fight choreographer)
- 1966: Brigade antigangs (by Bernard Borderie) - Le Limousin
- 1967: Fleur d'oseille (by Georges Lautner) - Riton Godot
- 1968: Angelique and the Sultan (by Bernard Borderie) - Bolbec
- 1968: Le Pacha (by Georges Lautner) - Riton
- 1969: Catherine, il suffit d'un amour (by Bernard Borderie) - Gros-Téton
- 1969: The Madwoman of Chaillot (by Bryan Forbes) - a waiter
- 1971: Sapho ou la Fureur d'aimer (by Georges Farrel) - Le peintre
- 1971: Le Cri du cormoran le soir au-dessus des jonques (by Michel Audiard) - Le conducteur du second engin (uncredited)
- 1972: Il était une fois un flic (by Georges Lautner) - Jeannot (uncredited)
- 1973: Quelques messieurs trop tranquilles (by Georges Lautner) - Maurice
- 1973: Hit! (by Sidney J. Furie) - Bornou
- 1975: Pas de problème ! (by Georges Lautner) - a killer
- 1976: Hippopotamours (by Christian Fuin) - Le masseur
- 1984: Joyeuses Pâques (by Georges Lautner)
- 1987: La Vie dissolue de Gérard Floque (by Georges Lautner) - L'homme du couple âgé (final film role)
