= Pierre Collet (actor) =

French actor (1914–1977)

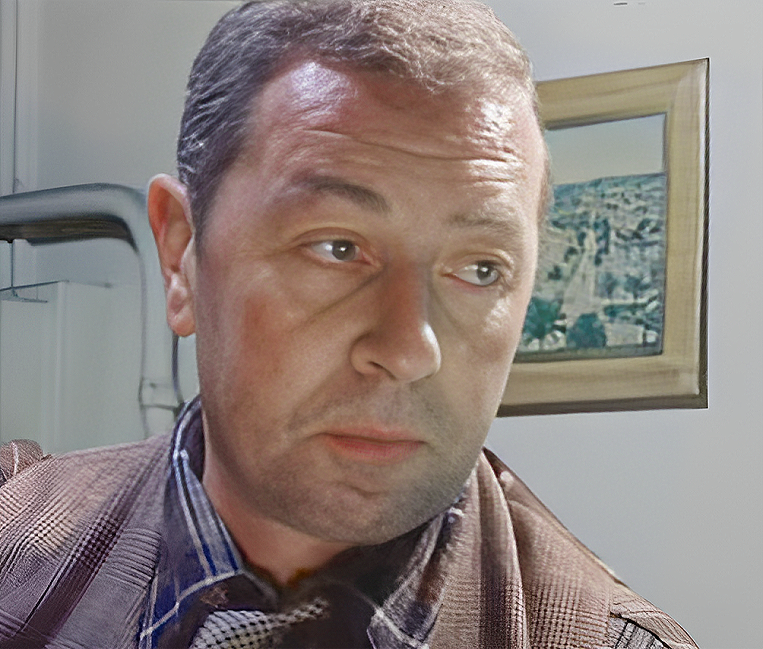
- Born: 10 March 1914; Montrouge, France
- Died: 30 October 1977 (aged 63); Paris, France
- Occupation: Actor
- Years active: 1943–1977

Pierre Collet (10 March 1914 – 30 October 1977) was a French film actor. He appeared in more than 100 films and television shows between 1943 and 1977.

== Selected filmography ==
- Goodbye Leonard (1943) – Le marchand d'habits (uncredited)
- Night Shift (1944) – Un réparateur de ligne (uncredited)
- Coup de tête (1944) – (uncredited)
- Florence est folle (1944)
- Night Warning (1946)
- La Maison sous la mer (1947) – Un mineur (uncredited)
- Histoires extraordinaires (1949) – Cotin / François
- The Winner's Circle (1950) – (uncredited)
- Royal Affairs in Versailles (1954) – Petit rôle (uncredited)
- If Paris Were Told to Us (1956) – Petit rôle (uncredited)
- Méfiez-vous fillettes (1957) – (uncredited)
- Thérèse Étienne (1958) – L'avocat
- Not Delivered (1958) – Morigny
- Le désordre et la nuit (1958) – Un inspecteur (uncredited)
- Le vent se lève (1959) – Crewman
- Le fauve est lâché (1959) – Marcel, le garagiste (uncredited)
- The Road to Shame (1959) – Nasol
- La Valse du Gorille (1959) – Bergère
- 125 Rue Montmartre (1959)
- Way of Youth (1959) – Un gendarme (uncredited)
- Quai du Point-du-Jour (1960)
- Recours en grâce (1960) – Le gendarme Fromont
- The Old Guard (1960) – Le livreur de bières
- Terrain vague (1960)
- Les Honneurs de la guerre (1961) – Morizot
- Le cave se rebiffe (1961) – Le chauffeur de taxi (uncredited)
- Les Ennemis (1962) – René – un homme de Gerlier
- Le Gentleman d'Epsom (1962) – Un parieur à jumelles (uncredited)
- La parole est au témoin (1963)
- Jeff Gordon, Secret Agent (1963) – Un gendarme (uncredited)
- Du mouron pour les petits oiseaux (1963) – Un consommateur au café (uncredited)
- Any Number Can Win (1963) – Camille (uncredited)
- Le temps des copains (1963)
- Si tous les amoureux du monde... (1963)
- Diary of a Chambermaid (1964) – Le voyageur
- Greed in the Sun (1964) – One of Castagliano's Employees
- Requiem pour un caïd (1964)
- The Unvanquished (1964) – Le policier au barrage (uncredited)
- Fantômas (1964) – Un agent
- Weekend at Dunkirk (1964) – Le capitaine Français
- The Gorillas (1964) – Le premier gardien à la Santé (uncredited)
- Le ciel sur la tête (1965)
- The Vampire of Düsseldorf (1965) – Le contremaître (uncredited)
- Circus Angel (1965) – Un truand
- Wake Up and Die (1966) – Le tenancier de l'hôtel (uncredited)
- Mademoiselle (1966) – Marcel
- Is Paris Burning? (1966) – Un policier résistant
- Triple Cross (1966) – German Warder
- Le Grand Dadais (1967) – Le commissaire
- Mr. and Mrs. Kabal's Theatre (1967) – M. Kabal (voice)
- The Return of Monte Cristo (1968) – L'ami d'Edmond à l'aeroclub
- Cemetery Without Crosses (1969) – Sheriff Ben
- Goto, Island of Love (1969)
- Life Love Death (1969) – Le bourreau
- Les patates (1969) – Le paysan à la carriole
- Rider on the Rain (1970) – (uncredited)
- Vertige pour un tueur (1970) – Le routier
- Le Cercle rouge (1970) – Le Gardien de prison
- Le Voyou (1970) – (uncredited)
- The Lion's Share (1971) – L'agriculteur
- La cavale (1971)
- The Widow Couderc (1971) – Le commissaire Mallet
- La Scoumoune (1972) – Le directeur de la prison
- Tintin and the Lake of Sharks (1972) – Le commentateur TV (voice)
- The Hostage Gang (1973)
- Le Silencieux (1973) – Le garagiste
- Un officier de police sans importance (1973)
- The Invitation (1973) – Pierre
- Hit! (1973) – Zero
- L'emmerdeur (1973) – Le boucher
- Two Men in Town (1973) – Le commissaire
- The Train (1973) – Le maire de Funnoy
- Les grands sentiments font les bons gueuletons (1973) – Le propriétaire de la Deux Chevaux
- Nuits rouges (1974) – Le Grand Maître des Templiers
- Bons baisers... à lundi (1974) – Le veilleur de nuit
- The Common Man (1975) – Un ivrogne
- French Connection II (1975) – Old Pro
- Opération Lady Marlène (1975) – Le concierge de Kramer
- Oublie-moi, Mandoline (1976)
- Le jour de noces (1977) – Felix
