= Audiard =

Audiard is a surname. Notable people with the surname include:

- Jacques Audiard (born 1952), French film director and screenwriter
- Michel Audiard (1920–1985), French screenwriter and film director
