= Touchez pas au grisbi =

- French theatrical release poster
- Directed by: Jacques Becker
- Screenplay by: Jacques Becker; Albert Simonin; Maurice Griffe
- Based on: Touchez pas au grisbi by Albert Simonin
- Produced by: Robert Dorfmann
- Starring: Jean Gabin; René Dary; Dora Doll; Paul Frankeur; Jeanne Moreau; Lino Ventura
- Cinematography: Pierre Montazel
- Edited by: Marguerite Renoir
- Music by: Jean Wiener
- Distributed by: Les Films Corona
- Release dates: 3 March 1954 (France); 9 September 1954 (Italy)
- Running time: 94 minutes
- Countries: France; Italy
- Language: French
- Box office: 4,710,496 admissions (France) $131,548 (2003 US re-release)

Touchez pas au grisbi ([tu.ʃe pɑ o ɡʁiz.bi], French for "Don't touch the loot"), released as Honour Among Thieves in the United Kingdom and Grisbi in the United States, is a 1954 French-Italian crime film starring Jean Gabin. Based on a novel by Albert Simonin, it was directed by Jacques Becker and produced by Robert Dorfmann, with a soundtrack by Jean Wiener. René Dary, Paul Frankeur, Jeanne Moreau, and Lino Ventura, making his film debut, appear in principal support.

The film was screened in competition at the 1954 Venice Film Festival, where Gabin won a best actor award. It is the first installment of the so-called "Max le Menteur trilogy", which are all based on novels by Simonin, but feature different characters, and followed by the more comedic Le cave se rebiffe and Les tontons flingueurs.

== Plot ==
Max, a successful middle-aged Parisian gangster, has dinner at Madame Bouche's restaurant, his hangout, with his longtime crime partner Riton. Riton has brought his girlfriend Josy, a burlesque dancer half his age, and her act partner Lola, who craves Max. Max's down on his luck protégé Marco shows up. The group leaves for the girls' club, with Riton slapping Josy for snorting some heroin. To settle a dispute between local drug kingpin Angelo and club owner Pierrot, Max gets Marco a job as a pusher working for Angelo. After the show, Max discovers Josy making out with Angelo, but does not tell Riton, then leaves early for home.

On the way, Max's cabbie notices they are being followed by a suspicious ambulance. Max gets the drop on its two hoodlums and sends them packing, then calls Riton and warns him not to go with Angelo, who has just invited him go out at 2 AM. Max takes Riton to his hideout and shows him the eight bars of gold they stole during a recent heist hidden in the trunk of a car locked in the building's garage. Upstairs, the two friends share a simple snack, with Max telling Riton about Josy and Angelo, then getting him to admit he had told Josy about the big score to impress her. Max concludes Josy told Angelo, who planned to beat the loot's location out of them that night. He confesses he is sick of the criminal lifestyle and plans to retire with the money from the gold, and tells Riton to leave Josy to the younger Angelo.

The next morning Max leaves early to fence the gold with his uncle, who needs time to raise the cash. Max leaves it, then returns to an empty apartment. He calls Josy's, and is told by the nervous porter that Riton had just been taken away in an ambulance, and that Josy is out.

Max rounds up Marco, then roughly, but unsuccessfully, interrogates Josy and the porter over where Angelo has taken Riton. Marco captures Fifi, one of Angelo's henchmen on a stakeout for Max. They go to tough-guy Pierrot for help interrogating the punk, but Fifi does not know anything useful. Angelo telephones and proposes to trade Riton for the gold, and Max agrees. He, Marco, and Pierrot arm themselves, retrieve the gold, and head out in Fifi's car.

On a deserted country road Max hands over the gold and Riton is returned unharmed. After his captors leave Riton warns Max that there had been a second car, which appears in the distance. Angelo's henchmen blow up Fifi's car with hand grenades, killing Marco, but are gunned down by the others. They use the henchmen's car to chase Angelo. A rolling shootout ensues, Riton is wounded, and Angelo's car crashes. Angelo is shot attempting to throw a grenade, which explodes and sets his car on fire. As it is engulfed Max is forced to leave the loot before they get caught.

Back at Pierrot's, Riton is patched up by a mob doctor. Riton urges Max to go about his normal routine to avoid suspicion, so Max takes wealthy mistress Betty to Bouche's for lunch. Everyone there is talking about the missing gold being discovered in the wreck of Angelo's car, and ask a tight-lipped Max what he thinks about it all. He calls to check on Riton, who has died. Playing his favorite song on the jukebox, he sits down to dine.

== Cast ==
- Jean Gabin as Max, a successful Parisian criminal
- René Dary as Henri Ducros, known as "Riton", Max's best friend and accomplice
- Dora Doll as Lola, a burlesque dancer who wants Max
- Paul Frankeur as Pierrot, a night club owner and underworld boss
- Jeanne Moreau as Josy, a burlesque dancer who is leaving Riton for Angelo
- Vittorio Sanipoli as Ramon, one of Angelo's henchmen
- Marilyn Buferd as Betty, Max's wealthy girlfriend
- Gaby Basset as Marinette, Pierrot's wife and the manager of his club
- Paul Barge as Eugène, the doorman at Oscar's building
- Alain Bouvette as Taxi Driver
- Daniel Cauchy as Fifi, Angelo's henchman who is caught by Marco and tortured by Pierrot
- Denise Clair as Madame Bouche, the owner of a restaurant
- Angelo Dessy as Bastien, one of Angelo's henchmen
- Michel Jourdan as Marco, Max's protégé
- Paul Oettly as Oscar, Max's uncle and fence
- Jean Riveyre as Porter at the Hotel Moderna
- Delia Scala as Huguette, Oscar's secretary
- Umberto Silvestri as one of Angelo's henchmen
- Lucilla Solivani as Nana, Pierrot's secretary
- Lino Ventura as Angelo Fraiser, an ambitious criminal with his own gang

== Background ==
Seeking to bounce back from two flops, director Jacques Becker read the novel Touchez pas au grisbi by Albert Simonin in 1953, and felt that it would make a good movie. He had been taken by his friend Henri-Georges Clouzot's film Le Salaire de la peur, which won the Palme d'Or au Festival de Cannes that year.

The screenwriters toned down the violence, racism and general sordid nature of the original Simonin novel, and Becker "gave French film noir a hugely successful new twist, creating the French gangster film... Grisbi encapsulates the genre". Touchez pas au grisbi is Becker's only gangster film, where he combined "a pensive meditation on age, friendship, and lost opportunities" with traditional crime caper elements of "double-crossings, violence, kidnappings, gun battles" in a way that was influential on future French police dramas with its "mood of ironic, existential fatalism".

Becker goes light on the traditional gangster film themes, and instead lavishes attention on "everyday rituals", such as Max and Riton hanging out at their favorite restaurant, Madame Bouche's, and a scene where the pair share wine and pâté while hiding out at Max's secret getaway.

French actor Daniel Gélin was first offered the role of Max, but turned it down, seeing himself as too young for the part. Despite his admiration for Gabin - especially in Les Bas-fonds and La Grande Illusion, Becker was at first reluctant to cast him since he represented pre-war French cinema and had yet to rekindle his élan after spending World War II in the United States. Nonetheless he sent the scenario to Gabin, then exploited the actor's more mature look in the film. Grisbi revived Gabin's career and led him to successfully playing ever older roles as he aged. While Becker was looking to cast Riton, Gabin introduced him to René Dary, who had found fame during the war years during the Occupation in rôles which Gabin might otherwise have played; Gabin also proposed Gaby Basset, his ex-wife, as the wife of Pierrot.

Touchez pas au grisbi marked the film debut of Lino Ventura, who went on to star in five pictures with Gabin, and become a close personal friend.

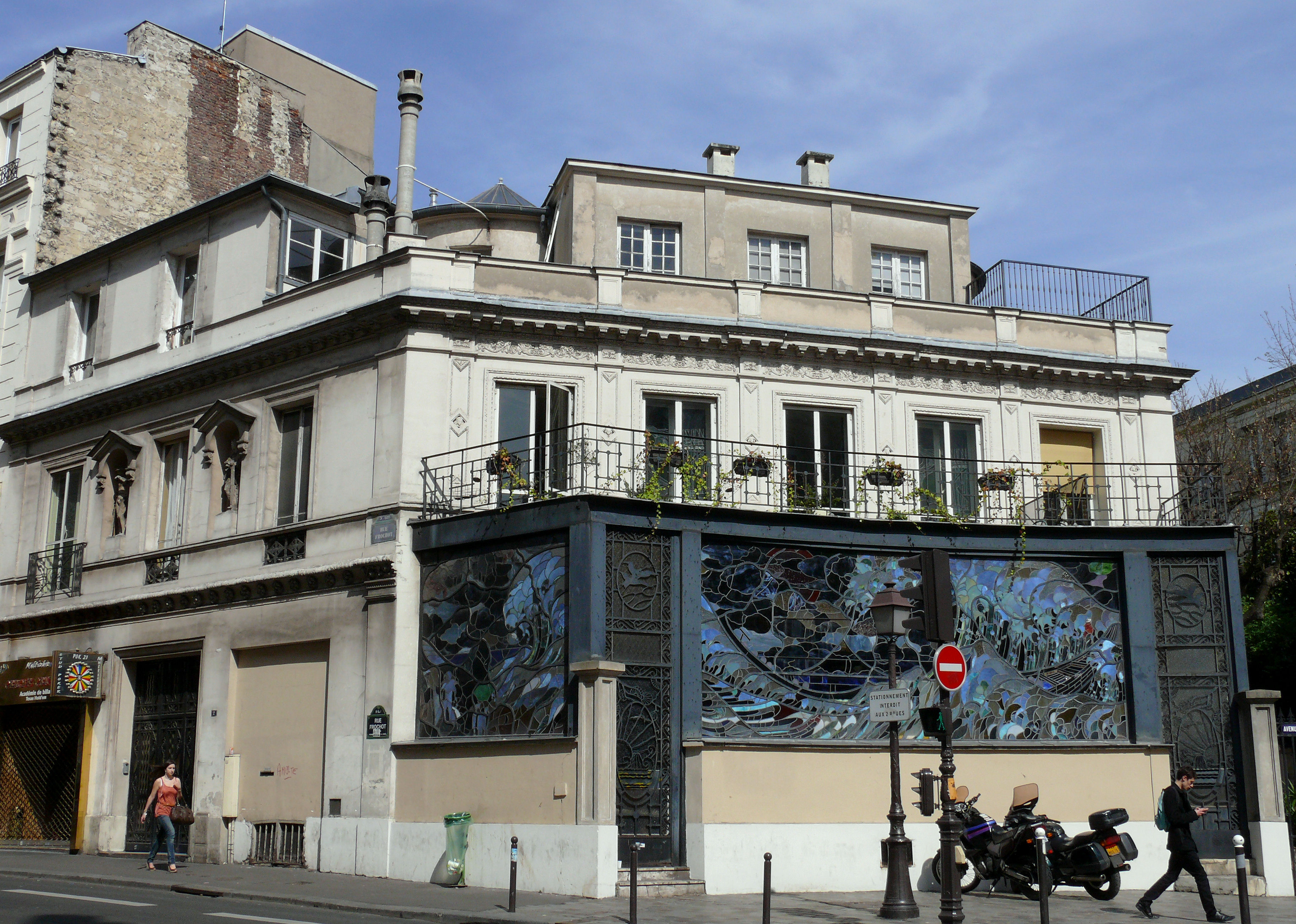
Rue Victor Massé, 9th arrondissement of Paris, where the nightclub scene at the start of the film was shot.

Shooting began in the Billancourt studios in Paris, but extended to outside filming in and around the city and Nice in the autumn of 1953. The principal crew were formed of individuals whom Becker knew well; Jean d’Eaubonne for production design, Pierre Montazel, Colette Crochot on the script and Marguerite Renoir for editing. Marc Maurette, former assistant to Becker at the start of his career, returned, as well as Becker's eldest son Jean.

Wiener had followed the shooting of the film with care and had decided with Becker to concentrate on two themes for the soundtrack: one for Max and another for the comradeship of Max and Riton. After Renoir had given him the first cut of the film's sequences she explained that Becker was thinking of using a song by Mezz Mezzrow for the 'juke-box' theme. To forestall this Wiener worked overnight, and was convinced that he should use a harmonica as the main instrument, having recently been impressed by the playing of a Jean Wetzel. The song 'The Touch/Le Grisbi' became the biggest earner of Wiener's career and soon spilled beyond film into covers by such performers as Richard Hayman, The Commanders, Harry James, Sy Oliver, Ted Heath, Larry Adler, Stanley Black and Betty Johnson.

== Reception ==
Touchez pas au grisbi was the fourth-most popular release at the French box office in 1954, giving Becker his first big box-office success since Goupi mains rouges of 1943.

The film currently holds a 100% approval rating on the review aggregator website Rotten Tomatoes, based on reviews from 23 critics, with a weighted average score of 8.7/10. It is also on Roger Ebert's "Great Movies" list.

A restored edition of the film was published by Blu-Ray in 2017.

Has been shown on the Turner Classic Movies show 'Noir Alley' with Eddie Muller.
