= Le Cri du cormoran, le soir au-dessus des jonques =

1971 film by Michel Audiard

- Theatrical release poster
- Directed by: Michel Audiard
- Written by: Michel Audiard; Jean-Marie Poiré
- Produced by: Alain Poiré
- Starring: Michel Serrault; Bernard Blier; Paul Meurisse
- Cinematography: Pierre Petit
- Music by: Eddie Vartan
- Production company: Gaumont
- Release date: 10 February 1971
- Running time: 88 minutes
- Country: France
- Language: French

Le Cri du cormoran, le soir au-dessus des jonques (Note: Sometimes written without comma, Le Cri du cormoran le soir au-dessus des jonques.) (lit. 'The Cry of the Cormorant, at Evening Above the Junks') is a 1971 French crime comedy film written and directed by Michel Audiard, and starring Michel Serrault, Bernard Blier and Paul Meurisse. The story is a loose adaptation of the 1968 American crime novel A Horse's Head, by Evan Hunter. It relies heavily on the eccentric humor of Michel Audiard, known for his punchy, slang-filled dialogue. The title, which has no connection to the plot, is typical of the absurdist style of Audiard, who enjoyed using long, drawn-out titles in his films as a director. The film includes the feature debut of Gérard Depardieu, in a minor role.

== Plot ==
Alfred Mullanet, an unemployed loser, lives off his wife and spends his time losing money at the racetrack. One day, he is kidnapped by the gang of Mr. K, a criminal mastermind who intends to use him as a courier. Forced to wear a specific jacket, Alfred is locked inside a coffin bound for Istanbul. The gang of Kruger — a rival of Mr. K — seizes the coffin, believing the jacket contains a fortune in cash. However, the treasure is hidden within the jacket's buttons, which contain diamonds. A frantic chase ensues to recover the garment which has been carelessly discarded, as Alfred tries to survive the crossfire between the two gangs.

== Cast ==
- Michel Serrault as Alfred "Freddy" Mullanet
- Bernard Blier as Mr. K
- Paul Meurisse as Kruger
- Jean Carmet as Gégène
- Marion Game as Mirabelle
- Françoise Giret as Irène, Alfred's wife
- Nancy Holloway as Mélanie
- Corinne Armand as Mélissa
- Darling Légitimus as Mélanie's mother
- Maurice Biraud as Émile Dubuisson
- Carlos as Purcell, one of Mr. K's henchmen
- Robert Dalban as Gustave
- Jacqueline Doyen as Marie-Martine
- Yves Robert as police commissioner
- Monique Mélinand as bystander
- Michel Modo as Marcel, a policeman
- Romain Bouteille as Loulou, a police officer
- Bernard Musson as sex shop client
- Jacques Hilling as sex shop client
- Gérard Depardieu as Henri, one of Kruger's henchmen
- Roger Lumont as one of Mr. K's henchmen
- Dominique Zardi as one of Mr. K's henchmen
- Stéphane Bouy as Georges, one of Kruger's henchmen
- Carlo Nell as Max
- Yves Barsacq as Sam
- Henri Cogan as driver
- Sylvie Bréal as Martine
- Moustache as one of Mr. K's henchmen
- Leroy Haynes as Boubou
- Michel Pilorgé as policeman

== Reception ==
The film performed reasonably well at the French box office, selling 839,293 admissions. Critical reception was mixed upon release: Louis Marcorelles of Le Monde gave the film a negative review, calling the direction hideous and the humor "demagogic". In a 2015 review, François Forestier of Le Nouvel Observateur said that while the film was not Audiard's best, it remained very funny, thanks to the cast and Audiard's trademark humorous dialogue.

== Home media ==
Le Cri du cormoran, le soir au-dessus des jonques was reissued on DVD and Blu-ray and released on streaming.
