= Salad by the Roots =

- Written by: Clarence Weff; Georges Lautner; Albert Kantof; Michel Audiard
- Produced by: Georges Lautner
- Starring: Louis de Funès; Michel Serrault; Mireille Darc; Maurice Biraud; Francis Blanche
- Cinematography: Maurice Fellous
- Edited by: Michelle David
- Music by: Georges Delerue
- Distributed by: Cocinor
- Release date: May 6, 1964 (France)
- Running time: 96 minutes
- Country: France
- Language: French

Salad by the Roots (French: Des pissenlits par la racine, literally (Eating) dandelions by the roots which is the French idiom for Pushing up the daisies) is a Franco-Italian comedy directed by Georges Lautner and released in 1964, a year after his success with Les Tontons flingueurs, which was also set in the Parisian underworld. It benefits from music by Georges Delerue and dialogue by Michel Audiard, among whose legendary lines is Plus t'as de pognon, moins t'as de principes. L'oseille c'est la gangrène de l'âme. (The more loot you've got, the fewer your principles. Lolly is the gangrene of the soul).

== Plot ==
Celebrating their release from prison in a Paris bar, criminal Jo sends his heavy Pommes-Chips to place a big bet. Just as he has done so, putting the ticket in the pocket of his strawberry check coat, in walks another criminal Jack, who during his absence has been living with his girl Rockie. Jack flees into a nearby theatre, which is showing the last night of a poor but popular play based on War and Peace. Pommes-Chips pursues him and in a running fight is killed by accident.

To hide the body, Jack puts it in an empty double-bass case belonging to his cousin Jérôme, who is playing the instrument on stage. Cast and crew all go off to a party, with stagehands bringing the heavy case for Jérôme. Also at the party is Jo, with Rockie who has decided he is a better option. Afterwards, Jack and Jérôme take the case to the house where Jérome lives with his aunt and his uncle, whose hobby is taxidermy. In the morning they find the case empty and the uncle, who is wearing Pommes-Chips' coat, confesses that he could not resist removing all the flesh because he can get a good price for such a fine skeleton.

The big race is run and the numbers in Pommes-Chips' coat are the winners. Jo sets Rockie to work on Jérôme, to wheedle him into getting the ticket off his uncle. She seduces him easily enough, and Jo is able to pick the uncle's pocket. Rushing round to the office to claim his winnings, he is told that the ticket he produces does not have the right numbers. Going home, he skilfully alters it to show the winning numbers. The film ends with his arrest for forgery and Rockie saying goodbye as he is led away in handcuffs. Laughing, she jumps into the luxurious convertible Jérôme has bought with the money from the real ticket.

== Cast ==
- Michel Serrault : Jérôme, the double bassist
- Maurice Biraud : Jo, the released criminal
- Mireille Darc : Rockie, the moll
- Louis de Funès : Jack, criminal cousin of Jérôme
- Francis Blanche : Uncle Absalon
- Gianni Musy : Pommes-Chips, the murdered heavy
