= Louis Arbessier =

French actor (1907–1998)

- Born: 9 April 1907; Vienne, Isère, France
- Died: 23 March 1998 (aged 90); Paris, France
- Occupation: Actor
- Years active: 1942-1995 (film & TV)

Louis Arbessier (9 April 1907 – 23 March 1998) was a French film and television actor. He played Napoleon III in the 1952 musical film Imperial Violets. Amongst his television roles was that of Maigret.

Arbessier was married and divorced four times, and had four children born between 1929 and 1964. His youngest son, Arnaud (born 1964), is a professional voice actor.

== Selected filmography ==
- Les petits riens (1942)
- Paysans noirs (1948) - L'administrateur
- Suzanne and the Robbers (1949) - Docteur Vinson
- Thirst of Men (1950) - Collet
- We Are All Murderers (1952) - L'avocat du tribunal pour enfants
- The Happiest of Men (1952) - Valise
- Imperial Violets (1952) - Napoléon III
- Mandat d'amener (1953) - M. Delanglade
- The Three Musketeers (1953) - Louis XIII
- Royal Affairs in Versailles (1954) - Louis XIII (uncredited)
- Cadet Rousselle (1954) - Le tribun
- La bella Otero (1954) - Le directeur du Café de Paris
- Queen Margot (1954) - L'amiral de Coligny
- Série noire (1955) - Le commissaire Lefranc
- Napoléon (1955) - Le maréchal Louis Berthier (uncredited)
- If Paris Were Told to Us (1956) - Louis XIII (uncredited)
- Les Mémoires d'un flic (1956) - Le président de la Cour
- Michel Strogoff (1956) - Tsar Alexandre II
- Action immédiate (1957) - Le Colonel
- The She-Wolves (1957) - Le commissaire de police Drouin
- Les Violents (1957) - Me Rodier
- Not Delivered (1958) - Le chirurgien Bailleul
- Les Misérables (1958) - Le préfet
- Women's Prison (1958) - Le directeur de la prison
- One Life (1958) - Monsieur Dandieu
- Le fric (1959) - Le juge
- Ce soir on tue (1959) - Interpol Man #3
- Le Panier à crabes (1960) - Le professeur
- Liberty Bar (1960) - Maigret
- Captain Blood (1960) - (uncredited)
- The Truth (1960) - Le professeur
- The President (1961) - Jussieu
- Âme qui vive (1961)
- Le Miracle des loups (1961) - Comte Hesselin
- The Lions Are Loose (1961) - Frédéric Moine
- The Reluctant Spy (1963) - Le directeur du musée
- The Great Spy Chase (1964) - The Swiss colonel
- The Dirty Game (1965) - Ivanov
- La corde au cou (1965) - L'avocat
- God's Thunder (1965) - Bricard, le ministre
- To Skin a Spy (1966) - Le colonel
- Pasha (1968) - Le directeur chez Boucheron
- Du blé en liasses (1969) - Le ministre
- Under the Sign of the Bull (1969) - Aupagneur
- Sapho ou la Fureur d'aimer (1971) - M. Monestier
- La Part des lions (1971) - Cornille - l'éditeur
- La michetonneuse (1972) - Le père de Justine
- Charlotte (1974) - Le père du Charlotte
- Mesrine (1984) - Lelièvre

== Bibliography ==
- Goble, Alan. The Complete Index to Literary Sources in Film. Walter de Gruyter, 1999.
