= Une souris chez les hommes =

- Directed by: Jacques Poitrenaud
- Written by: Michel Audiard; Francis Ryck
- Produced by: Robert Amon; Claude Jaeger; Georges Lourau; Francis Cosne; Robert Dorfmann
- Starring: Louis de Funès; Dany Saval
- Cinematography: Marcel Grignon
- Edited by: Paul Cayatte
- Music by: Guy Béart; Michel Colombier
- Color process: Black and white
- Production companies: Filmsonor; Francos Films; Procinex; Mondex Films
- Distributed by: Cinédis
- Release date: 1964
- Running time: 90 minutes
- Country: France
- Language: French

Une souris chez les hommes (English: A Mouse with the Men) is a French comedy film from 1964, directed by Jacques Poitrenaud, written by Michel Audiard and Francis Ryck, starring Dany Saval and Louis de Funès. The film is known under the titles: "A Mouse with the Men" (International English title), "Un drôle de caïd" (alternative French title of 1968 theater release), "O Tesouro Oculto" (Portugal), "Bei Oscar ist 'ne Schraube locker" (West Germany), "Due uomini in fuga... per un colpo maldestro" (Italy).

== Cast ==
- Louis de Funès : Marcel Ravelais
- Maurice Biraud : Francis Blanchet
- Dany Saval : Lucille Baillet, the neighbour
- Robert Manuel : Mr Léon Dufour, the director of stores
- Jean Lefebvre : Le surveillant T.V
- Robert Vattier : The employee frames (to confirm)
- Dany Carrel : Sylvie Blanchet, wife of Francis
- Maria Pacôme : Tante Emma, the aunt of Lucille
- Dora Doll : Catherine, the cashier of stores " Dufour "
- André Badin : Le gardien de nuit
- Claude Pieplu : inspector
- Jacques Legras : inspector
- Madeleine Clervanne : Mrs Laurent
- Evelyne Dassas : Mireille, une employée du magasin "Bon Marché"
- Gérard Lartigau : Lucky
- Tanya Lopert : friend of Lucky
- Philippe Castelli : the secure guard of L'ouvre
- Jacques Dynam : Le patron du café
- Yvan Chiffre : a skater
- Lionel Vitrant : friend of Lucky
- Bernard Musson : a police agent
- Marcel Bernier : a conveyor
- Albert Michel : a cashier of "Bon Marché"
- Edouard Francomme : a conveyor
- Gilbert Servien : a client of "Bon Marché"
- Andrès : le maître d'hôtel
- Jacques Santi (uncredited)
- Jean Amadou (uncredited)
- Jacques Salmon
- Bernard Cara
