= Bernard Gérard (composer) =

French composer

Bernard Gérard (26 April 1930 – 29 June 2000) was a French composer of film scores. He was one of Michel Magne's principal orchestrators, and worked as well with Georges Lautner and Jean-Pierre Melville. Films upon which he worked include Ne nous fâchons pas, La Grande Sauterelle, Le Deuxième souffle, and Road to Salina.
