= Lino Ventura =

Italian-born actor (1919–1987)

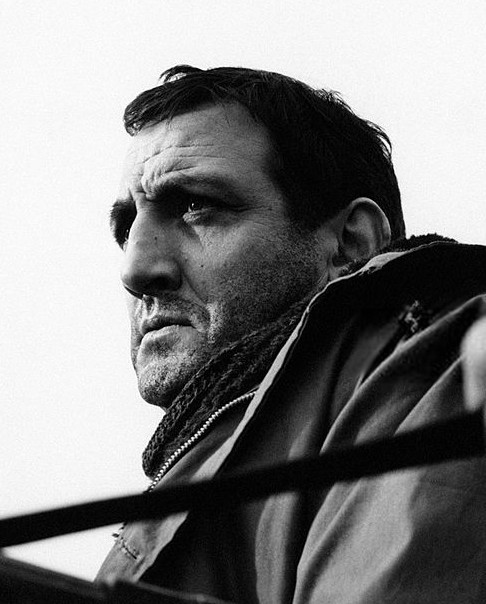
- Born: Angiolino Giuseppe Pasquale Ventura; 14 July 1919; Busseto, Emilia-Romagna, Italy
- Died: 22 October 1987 (aged 68); Saint-Cloud, Île-de-France, France
- Other name: Lino Borrini
- Occupations: Actor, philanthropist, professional wrestler
- Years active: 1953–1987
- Spouse: Odette Lecomte (m. 1942)
- Children: 4
- Professional wrestling career
- Ring name(s): Lino Borrini "The Italian Rocket"
- Billed height: 5 ft 9 in (175 cm)
- Trained by: Fred Oberlander
- Retired: 1950

Angiolino Giuseppe Pasquale Ventura (14 July 1919 – 22 October 1987), known as Lino Ventura, was an Italian-born actor, philanthropist, and professional wrestler, who lived and worked for most of his life in France. He was considered one of the greatest leading men of French cinema during the 1960s and 1970s, known for his portrayal of tough characters on both sides of the law in crime dramas.

Born in Parma and raised in Paris, Ventura worked as a professional wrestler before an injury ended his career. He made his film debut as a gangster in the 1954 Jacques Becker film Touchez pas au grisbi and rapidly became one of France's favourite film actors, playing opposite many other great stars and working with such leading directors as Louis Malle, Claude Sautet, and Claude Miller. Usually portraying a tough man, either a criminal or a cop, he also featured as a leader of the Resistance in the Jean-Pierre Melville-directed Army of Shadows (1969). He was nominated for a Cesar Award for his portrayal of Jean Valjean in the 1982 film adaptation of Les Misérables.

After one of his four children, a daughter, was born handicapped, he and his wife founded a charity Perce-Neige (Snowdrop) which aids disabled children and their parents. Though a lifelong resident and pop cultural icon in France, Ventura always considered himself an Italian first and foremost, and never took French citizenship. He was nonetheless voted 23rd in a 2005 poll of the 100 greatest Frenchmen.

== Early life ==
Ventura was born in Busseto, in the province of Parma in 1919, the son of Giovanni Ventura and Luisa Borrini. While Ventura was still very young, his father moved to Paris for work. He and his mother followed when Ventura was eight-years-old, but could not locate his father and settled in Montreuil.

To supplement his mother's income, Ventura left school at age nine and worked various oddjobs. As a teenager, he met Austrian Greco-Roman wrestler Fred Oberlander, who became his mentor. He met his wife, Odette Lecomte while working for an Italian travel agency in Paris.

As an Italian citizen, Ventura was conscripted into the Italian Army during World War II. In July 1943, he deserted and rejoined his wife in Paris. To avoid being denounced or arrested by the occupying German forces, he and his wife lived hid in a barn in Maine-et-Loire until the liberation of France.

== Professional wrestling career ==
With his legit Greco-Roman wrestling skills, Ventura dabbled in prizefighting, but switched to professional wrestling to earn more money. He adopted the ring name "The Italian Rocket" Lino Borrini (from his mother's maiden name). In February 1950, he won the European Middleweight title. However, he dropped the title after injuring his knee on a March 31 bout with Henri Cogan, and retired from in-ring competition soon after. For some time afterwards, he worked as a booker and promoter. One of Ventura's discoveries was Édouard Carpentier, whom he helped train.

== Acting career ==
=== Early roles ===
In 1953, by chance, one of his friends mentioned him to Jacques Becker who was looking for an Italian actor to play opposite Jean Gabin in a gangster movie called Touchez pas au grisbi (1954). Becker offered him on the spot the role of Angelo, which Ventura refused at first but then accepted. He had such a presence in the film that the whole profession took notice. The film was a big success.

Ventura started to build up an acting career in similar hard-boiled gangster films, often playing beside his friend Jean Gabin, including his second film, Razzia sur la chnouf (1955).

He followed it with Law of the Streets (1956), Crime and Punishment (1956) with Gabin.

=== Later career ===
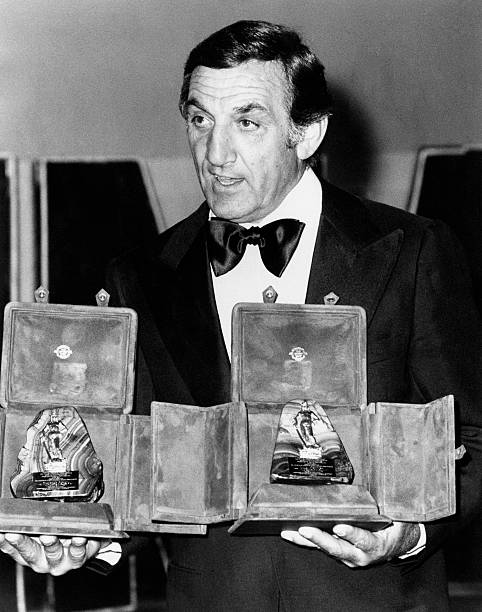
Lino Ventura in 1974.

Some of his most famous roles include the portrait of corrupt police chief Tiger Brown in The Threepenny Opera (1963) and mob boss Vito Genovese in The Valachi Papers (1972).

Ventura remained active until the year before his death from a heart attack in 1987 at the age of 68. Having a disabled daughter himself, he created a charitable foundation, Perce-Neige (Snowdrop) in 1966, which supports disabled people.

Throughout his career, he was one of the most popular actors of French cinema. He spoke French without any accent (excepting a working class Parisian one at the beginning of his career) and instead spoke Italian with a slight French accent, having arrived in France at the age of seven. Forcibly conscripted into the Italian army during the Second World War, he deserted. But, although his wife and four children were French, he remained an Italian citizen throughout his life, not wanting to give up Italian citizenship, out of respect for his parents. Despite this, he was ranked 23rd of the 100 greatest Frenchmen, 17 years after his death. Despite his personal connection to Italy he only made a handful of Italian films, among them The Last Judgement (Il giudizio universale, 1961), Illustrious Corpses (Cadaveri eccellenti, 1976) and Cento Giorni a Palermo (1983). While able to perform in his native language, due to his accent he had to be dubbed into Italian by other actors in several of these pictures, notably Cento Giorni a Palermo.

Somewhat paradoxically, Ventura attributed his great success to his limited range as an actor; and often said "If I cannot believe in a character, or if something does not ring true, I cannot act it."

In a 1980 interview he said that the previous year "I began to realize how incredibly lucky I had been since the age of 9, how much I had been loved by so many people. When I act, I am doing what I love, and I am paid for it. So I put myself in the service of the film, never the film in service to me." He mentioned he turned down several roles - a part in Apocalypse Now (cut from the final film), a role in a Robert Aldrich film and the part played by François Truffaut in Close Encounters of the Third Kind.

He said, "The story is everything. My good friend Jean Gabin told me 25 years ago there are three important things in movies: the story, the story and the story."

"I have limitations," he said. "I have no training; I could not do the classics. What I can do is myself. And I like best not to talk at all... I study the script, and then try to become the character. That is very mysterious, how that happens. I cannot explain it. There are so many mysteries in cinema, the way everything must interlock, that when you think of it all, you never want to make a film."

== Charitable work and advocacy for children with disabilities ==
His daughter Linda, who suffered a stroke at birth, was left with an intellectual disability. Confronted with the lack of support and care facilities for children with disabilities, Lino and Odette Ventura founded the charitable association Perce-Neige in 1966, following the appeal of 6 December 1965. Based in Saint-Cloud (Hauts-de-Seine), where the couple lived, the organization was dedicated to “supporting children with special needs” by assisting existing associations working in the field of disability and by raising public awareness and advocating for greater recognition of the needs of children with disabilities and their families. In May 2016, Perce-Neige became a foundation.

The year 1975 marked the association’s first major achievement with the adoption of the Framework Law on the rights of persons with disabilities and Law of 1975 relating to social and medico-social institutions. In 1976, Perce-Neige was recognized as a public-interest organization, and six years later the first Perce-Neige residential facility opened in Sèvres, in the Paris suburbs. Following the death of Lino Ventura, Perce-Neige continued its mission and contributed to the creation of care facilities across France, numbering thirty-nine establishments in 2023.

== Filmography ==
Year	Title	Role	Director	Starring	Notes
1954	Touchez pas au grisbi	Angelo Fraiser	Jacques Becker	with Jean Gabin and Jeanne Moreau	
1955	Razzia sur la chnouf	Roger "the Catalan“	Henri Decoin	with Jean Gabin	
1956	Law of the Streets	Mario	Ralph Habib	with Jean-Louis Trintignant and Raymond Pellegrin	
1956	Crime and Punishment	Gustave Messonnier	Georges Lampin	with Jean Gabin and Marina Vlady	
1957	Burning Fuse	Legentil	Henri Decoin	with Raymond Pellegrin and Peter van Eyck	
1957	Action immédiate	Bérès	Maurice Labro	with Henri Vidal and Barbara Laage	
1957	Speaking of Murder	Pepito	Gilles Grangier	with Jean Gabin and Annie Girardot	
1957	L'Étrange Monsieur Steve	Denis	Raymond Bailly	with Jeanne Moreau and Philippe Lemaire	
1957	Three Days to Live	Lino Ferrari	Gilles Grangier	with Daniel Gélin and Jeanne Moreau	
1957	Ces dames préfèrent le mambo	Paulo	Bernard Borderie	with Eddie Constantine	
1958	Maigret Sets a Trap	Inspector Torrence	Jean Delannoy	with Jean Gabin and Annie Girardot	
1958	Elevator to the Gallows	Inspector Cherrier	Louis Malle	with Jeanne Moreau and Maurice Ronet	
1958	The Lovers of Montparnasse	Morel	Jacques Becker	with Gérard Philipe, Anouk Aimée and Lilli Palmer	
1958	The Mask of the Gorilla	Géo Paquet	Bernard Borderie	with Charles Vanel and Bella Darvi	
1959	Le fauve est lâché	Paul Lamiani	Maurice Labro	with Estella Blain and Paul Frankeur	
1959	Marie-Octobre	Carlo Bernardi	Julien Duvivier	with Danielle Darrieux	
1959	Sursis pour un Vivant	Borcher	Victor Merenda	with Henri Vidal and Dawn Addams	
1959	Twelve Hours By the Clock	Albert Fourbieux	Géza Radványi	with Eva Bartok, Hannes Messemer and Gert Fröbe	
1959	Witness in the City	Ancelin	Édouard Molinaro	with Franco Fabrizzi and Sandra Milo	
1959	125 Rue Montmartre	Pascal	Gilles Grangier	with Andréa Parisy	
1959	Way of Youth	Tiercelin	Michel Boisrond	with Françoise Arnoul, Bourvil and Alain Delon	
1960	Classe tous risques	Abel Davos	Claude Sautet	with Sandra Milo and Jean-Paul Belmondo	
1960	Mistress of the World	Biamonte	William Dieterle	with Martha Hyer and Carlos Thompson	
1961	Girl in the Window	Federico	Luciano Emmer	with Marina Vlady	
1961	Taxi for Tobruk	Theo Dumas	Denys de La Patellière	with Charles Aznavour and Hardy Krüger	
1961	The Last Judgment	Giovanna's father	Vittorio De Sica	with Jack Palance and Ernest Borgnine	
1961	Black City	A gangster	Duilio Coletti	with Ernest Borgnine and Keenan Wynn	
1961	The Lions Are Loose	André Challenberg	Henri Verneuil	with Jean-Claude Brialy and Claudia Cardinale	
1962	Emile's Boat	Émile Bouet	Denys de La Patellière	with Annie Girardot, Michel Simon and Pierre Brasseur	
1962	Girl on the Road	the driver	Jacqueline Audry	with Agathe Aems and Gilbert Bécaud	
1962	The Devil and the Ten Commandments	Garigny	Julien Duvivier	with Charles Aznavour and Louis de Funès	(episode "Homicide point ne seras")
1962	Carmen di Trastevere	Vincenzo	Carmine Gallone	with Giovanna Ralli and Dante di Paolo	
1963	The Threepenny Opera	Tiger Brown	Wolfgang Staudte	with Curd Jürgens, Hildegard Knef and Gert Fröbe	
1963	Les Tontons flingueurs	Fernand Naudin	Georges Lautner	with Bernard Blier, Francis Blanche, Jean Lefebvre, Sabine Sinjen and Horst Frank	
1964	Greed in the Sun	Hervé Marec	Henri Verneuil	with Jean-Paul Belmondo, Bernard Blier and Gert Fröbe	
1964	Weeping for a Bandit	El Lutos	Carlos Saura	with Francisco Rabal and Lea Massari	
1964	The Monocle Laughs	Elie's Client	Georges Lautner	with Paul Meurisse	cameo appearance, Uncredited
1964	The Great Spy Chase	Francis Lagneau	Georges Lautner	with Bernard Blier and Mireille Darc	
1965	The Dictator's Guns	Capt. Jacques Cournot	Claude Sautet	with Sylva Koscina and Leo Gordon	
1965	La Métamorphose des cloportes	Alphonse Maréchal	Pierre Granier-Deferre	with Irina Demick, Pierre Brasseur and Charles Aznavour	
1965	The Wise Guys	Laurent	Robert Enrico	with Bourvil and Marie Dubois	
1966	Ne nous fâchons pas	Antoine Beretto	Georges Lautner	with Jean Lefebvre and Mireille Darc	
1966	To Skin a Spy	Pascal Fabre	Jacques Deray	with Jean Servais and Marilu Tolo	
1966	Le Deuxième Souffle	Gustave Minda	Jean-Pierre Melville	with Paul Meurisse and Raymond Pellegrin	
1967	The Last Adventure	Roland	Robert Enrico	with Alain Delon and Joanna Shimkus	
1968	Le Rapace	Rital	José Giovanni	with Rosa Furman and Xavier Marc	
1969	Army of Shadows	Philippe Gerbier	Jean-Pierre Melville	with Simone Signoret	
1969	Le Clan des Siciliens	Inspector Le Goff	Henri Verneuil	with Jean Gabin, Alain Delon and Irina Demick	
1970	Last Known Address	Chief inspector Marceau Leonetti	José Giovanni	with Marlène Jobert	
1971	Fantasia Among the Squares	Sagamore Noonan	Gérard Pirès	with Mireille Darc and Jean Yanne	
1971	Boulevard du Rhum	Cornelius von Zeelinga	Robert Enrico	with Brigitte Bardot and Guy Marchand	
1972	The Valachi Papers	Vito Genovese	Terence Young	with Charles Bronson and Jill Ireland	
1972	L'aventure, c'est l'aventure	Lino Massaro	Claude Lelouch	with Jacques Brel, Charles Denner and Charles Gérard	
1973	Escape to Nowhere	Clément Tibère	Claude Pinoteau	with Lea Massari	
1973	La Raison du Plus Fou	Le deuxième motard	François Reichenbach	with Raymond Devos and Alice Sapritch	cameo appearance, Uncredited
1973	Happy New Year	Simon	Claude Lelouch	with Françoise Fabian	
1973	Far West	the prisoner	Jacques Brel	with Gabriel Jabbour and Danièle Evenou	
1973	L'Emmerdeur	Ralf Milan	Edouard Molinaro	with Jacques Brel	
1974	Three Tough Guys	Father Charlie	Duccio Tessari	with Isaac Hayes and Fred Williamson	
1974	The Slap	Jean Douléan	Claude Pinoteau	with Annie Girardot and Isabelle Adjani	
1975	La Cage	Julien	Pierre Granier-Deferre	with Ingrid Thulin	
1975	The French Detective	Inspector Verjeat	Pierre Granier-Deferre	with Patrick Dewaere and Françoise Brion	
1976	Illustrious Corpses	Inspector Amerigo Rogas	Francesco Rosi	with Fernando Rey and Max von Sydow	
1978	The Medusa Touch	Detective-inspector Brunel	Jack Gold	with Richard Burton and Lee Remick	
1978	Butterfly on the Shoulder	Roland Fériaud	Jacques Deray	with Claudine Auger and Paul Crauchet	
1979	Jigsaw (L'Homme en colère)	Romain Dupre	Claude Pinoteau	with Angie Dickinson and Donald Pleasence	
1980	Les Seducteurs	François Quérole	Edouard Molinaro	with Catherine Salviat	(segment "The French Method")
1981	Garde à vue	Inspector Antoine Gallien	Claude Miller	with Michel Serrault and Romy Schneider	
1982	Espion, lève-toi	Sébastien Grenier	Yves Boisset	with Michel Piccoli and Bruno Cremer	
1982	Les Misérables	Jean Valjean	Robert Hossein	with Michel Bouquet	
1983	The Ruffian	Aldo	José Giovanni	with Bernard Giraudeau and Claudia Cardinale	
1984	One Hundred Days in Palermo	General Carlo Dalla Chiesa	Giuseppe Ferrara	with Lino Troisi	
1984	La Septième Cible	Bastien Grimaldi	Claude Pinoteau	with Lea Massari	
1984	La jonque chinoise		Claude Bernard-Aubert		
1986	Sword of Gideon	Papa	Michael Anderson	with Rod Steiger and Michael York	TV movie
1987	La Rumba	Un caïd	Roger Hanin	with Roger Hanin, Michel Piccoli and Corinne Touzet	cameo appearance, Uncredited, (final film role)
