= Three Days to Live =

- Directed by: Gilles Grangier
- Written by: Peter Vanett (novel); Michel Audiard; Guy Bertret; Gilles Grangier
- Produced by: André Deroual; Jacques Gauthier
- Starring: Daniel Gélin; Jeanne Moreau; Lino Ventura
- Cinematography: Louis Née; Armand Thirard
- Edited by: Jacqueline Sadoul
- Music by: Joseph Kosma
- Production company: International Motion Pictures
- Distributed by: Les Films Fernand Rivers
- Release dates: 14 August 1957 (Cannes Film Festival); 12 March 1958 (France)
- Running time: 85 minutes
- Country: France
- Language: French

Three Days to Live (French: Trois jours à vivre) is a 1957 French crime film directed by Gilles Grangier and starring Daniel Gélin, Jeanne Moreau and Lino Ventura. It was shot at the Saint-Maurice Studios in Paris and on location in Le Havre and Rouen. The film's sets were designed by the art director Roger Briaucourt. It premiered at the Cannes Film Festival in August 1957.

== Synopsis ==
An actor, struggling as a part of a company touring the provinces, identifies the suspect in a murder case and becomes an overnight sensation. However the man he has accused escapes and now threatens him.

== Cast ==
- Daniel Gélin as Simon Belin
- Jeanne Moreau as Jeanne Fortin
- Lino Ventura as Lino Ferrari
- Georges Flamant as Inspector Segalier
- Albert Augier as Dédé
- Aimé Clariond as Charlie Bianchi
- Roland Armontel as Alexandre Bérimont
- Joëlle Bernard as Mauricette
- Moustache as Davros
- Robert Rollis as Lucien Morisot
- Evelyne Rey as Bélina
- Jannick Arvel as Thérese
- Jacques Marin as Le gendarme
- Jean Toulout as Président des Assises
- Jean-Marie Rivière as Un comédien
- Jo Peignot as Patron du café
- Jean Degrave as Réceptionniste de l'hôtel
- Marcel Pérès as Propriétaire du thêatre
- José Quaglio as Un acteur
- François Joux as Secrétaire du commissaire

== Bibliography ==
- Goble, Alan. The Complete Index to Literary Sources in Film. Walter de Gruyter, 1999.
