= The Lions Are Loose =

Les Lions sont lâchés
- Directed by: Henri Verneuil
- Written by: France Roche; Michel Audiard
- Starring: Jean-Claude Brialy; Claudia Cardinale; Danielle Darrieux; Michèle Morgan
- Cinematography: Christian Matras
- Edited by: Borys Lewin
- Music by: Georges Garvarentz
- Production companies: Franco London Films; Société Nouvelle des Établissements Gaumont (SNEG); Vides Cinematografica
- Distributed by: Gaumont Distribution
- Release date: 20 September 1961
- Running time: 95 minutes
- Countries: Italy; France
- Language: French

Les Lions sont lâchés (US title: The Lions Are Loose) is a 1961 French comedy film directed by Henri Verneuil, and written by France Roche and Michel Audiard (dialogue). The music score was by Georges Garvarentz and the cinematography by Christian Matras.

It tells the story of three women living in Paris.

== Principal cast ==
- Jean-Claude Brialy as Didier Marèze
- Claudia Cardinale as Albertine Ferran
- Danielle Darrieux as Marie-Laure Robert-Guichard
- Michèle Morgan as Cécile
- Lino Ventura as Le docteur André Challenberg
- Denise Provence as Hélène Challenberg
- Daniel Ceccaldi as Georges Guichard
- Martine Messager as Florence Guichard
- Darry Cowl as Richard
- Jean Ozenne as Alfred Robert-Guichard
- Francis Nani as Arnaud Guichard
- François Nocher as Gilles
- Louis Arbessier as Frédéric Moine
- Bernard Musson as Gabriel, Butler
- Charles Aznavour as himself
