= Let's Not Get Angry =

- French theatrical release poster
- French: Ne nous fâchons pas
- Directed by: Georges Lautner
- Screenplay by: Michel Audiard, Marcel Jullian, Georges Lautner, Jean Marsan
- Produced by: Alain Poiré
- Cinematography: Maurice Fellous
- Edited by: Michelle David
- Music by: Bernard Gérard
- Production company: Gaumont International
- Distributed by: Gaumont Distribution
- Release date: 20 April 1966 (France)
- Running time: 100 minutes
- Country: France
- Language: French

Let's Not Get Angry (French: Ne nous fâchons pas) is a 1966 French police comedy film directed by Georges Lautner and starring Lino Ventura, Jean Lefebvre, Mireille Darc and Michel Constantin. The score was composed by Bernard Gérard. The film premiered on April 20, 1966.

== Plot ==
Antoine Beretto, a.k.a. "Tonio", is a former gangster who has retrained in a boat rental, waterskiing and diving school business in Collioure. Two former accomplices, hunted by the anti-gang brigade, visit him to borrow money and ask him to take them to Italy by sea. Beretto is reluctant at first, but eventually agrees, advancing them four million (40,000 new francs).

So that he can get his money back, the two crooks on the run give him the name of Léonard Michalon, a swindler who has vanished with the money from a bet placed at the Cagnes-sur-Mer racecourse. Michalon is a crooked bookmaker. He takes clandestine bets at the races with the promise of huge winnings, but in fact runs off with the money. Antoine Beretto meets Michalon through a friend, Jeff, who, like him, is a retired gangster. Jeff warns him that Michalon is a coward and a traitor. He's a parasite whose profession is to swindle others for pittance. He's not worth the effort, and he's more likely to cause problems than solve them.

Once flushed out, Michalon turns out to be just as Jeff describes: passive, whiny, fishy, disloyal and insolvent. But above all, he's wanted by the eccentric gang of the mysterious "Colonel" McLean, a British subject who, suspecting Michalon of knowing about his plans to hold up a huge gold convoy, seems determined to kill him. Antoine and Jeff must do everything in their power to protect Léonard from the colonel's destructive attempts

== Cast ==
- Lino Ventura as Antoine Beretto
- Jean Lefebvre as Léonard Michalon
- Michel Constantin as Jeff, the boss
- Mireille Darc as Églantine Michalon
- Tommy Duggan as Colonel McLean
- Marcel Bernier as Marcel, Jeff's employee
- Thierry Thibaud as Shark
- André Pousse as a mobster on the run
- Mick Besson as a mobster on the run
- Robert Dalban as the embalmer
- Sylvia Sorrente as Antoine's friend Vicky
- Serge Sauvion as the superintendent
- France Rumilly as Gisèle, the accountant
- Jean Panisse as the scrap dealer (uncredited)
- Les majorettes de Nice as themselves
- Christian Barbier as one of the policemen at the very beginning of the film (uncredited)
- Philippe Castelli as the narrator of the trailer

== Production ==
Part of the film was shot in Nice, France. Nice's historic Hotel Negresco was one of the locations.

== Release and reception ==
The critics panned the film upon release. For example, Jean-André Fieschi, of Cahiers du Cinéma, accused Lautner of "exploiting" a well-worn "mythology", and Audiard of committing "increasingly esoteric dialogues". According to him, the "scope-color" is "not beautiful" and the film is underpinned by an anti-British racism of the franchouillards, and he considers the whole film to be a "tedious" mix of noir clichés and "Tex Avery-style gags".

In contrast, the film was a big hit with audiences, with a total of 1,877,412 admissions, and it has since become a classic of French cinema and has been shown many times on French television.
