= Albert Simonin =

French writer (1905–1980)

Albert Simonin (1905–1980) was a French novelist and scriptwriter. He was born in the La Chapelle quarter of the 18th arrondissement of Paris. His father was a florist. Albert was orphaned by the age of 16. His novel Touchez Pas au Grisbi featuring the Parisian gangster Max le Menteur was turned into a movie starring Jean Gabin. Simonin co-authored the screenplay for the movie. After World War II, he spent five years in prison for collaboration.

== Selected filmography ==
- Touchez pas au grisbi (1954)
- The Price of Love (1955)
- Short Head (1956)
- Burning Fuse (1957)
- Anyone Can Kill Me (1957)
- A Bullet in the Gun Barrel (1958)
- The Road to Shame (1959)
- Le cave se rebiffe (1961)
- The Gentleman from Epsom (1962)
- Any Number Can Win, based on a novel by Zekial Marko (1963)
- Les Tontons flingueurs (1963)
- Une souris chez les hommes, based on a novel by Francis Ryck (1964)
- The Great Spy Chase (1964)
- When the Pheasants Pass (1965)
- La Métamorphose des cloportes, based on a novel by Alphonse Boudard (1965)
- Pasha, based on a novel by Jean Laborde (1968)

== See also ==
- Candide ou l'optimisme au XXe siècle (film, 1960)
