= Michel Audiard =

French screenwriter and film director (1920-1985)

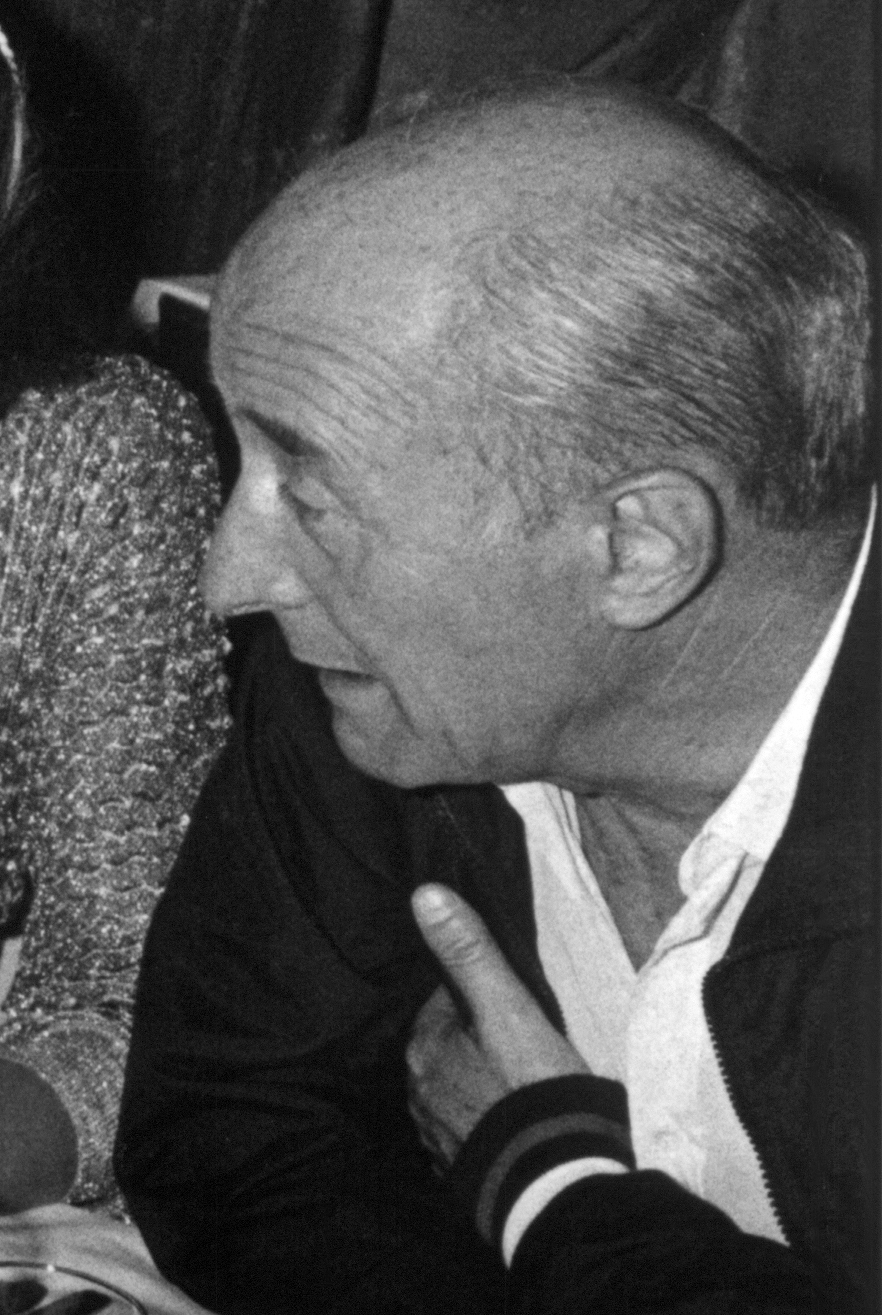
- Audiard in 1981
- Born: Paul Michel Audiard; 15 May 1920; Paris, France
- Died: 27 July 1985 (aged 65); Dourdan, Essonne, France
- Occupation: Film director
- Years active: 1949–1985
- Children: Jacques Audiard

Paul Michel Audiard (French: [miʃɛl odjaʁ]; 15 May 1920 – 27 July 1985) was a French screenwriter and film director, known for his witty, irreverent and slang-laden dialogues which made him a prominent figure on the French cultural scene of the 1960s and 1970s. He was the father of French film director Jacques Audiard.

== Screenwriting filmography ==
=== 1940s–1950s ===
- 1949 :
  - Mission in Tangier, directed by André Hunebelle
  - One Only Loves Once, directed by Jean Stelli
- 1950 :
  - Brune ou blonde, directed by Jacques Garcia
  - Beware of Blondes, directed by André Hunebelle
- 1951 :
  - Vedettes sans maquillage, directed by Jacques Guillon
  - Young Love, directed by Guy Lefranc
  - Le Passe-muraille, directed by Jean Boyer
  - Darling Caroline, directed by Richard Pottier
  - Ma femme est formidable (uncredited), directed by André Hunebelle
  - Massacre en dentelles, directed by André Hunebelle
  - The Man in My Life, directed by Guy Lefranc
  - Bim le petit âne, directed by Albert Lamorisse
- 1952 :
  - Adorable Creatures (uncredited), directed by Christian-Jaque
  - Pour vous, mesdames (uncredited), directed by Jacques Garcia
  - Elle et moi, directed by Guy Lefranc
  - Le Feu quelque part, directed by Pierre Foucaud (Court-métrage)
  - Le Duel à travers les âges, directed by Pierre Foucaud (Court-métrage)
- 1953 :
  - The Long Teeth, directed by Daniel Gélin
  - Les Trois Mousquetaires, directed by André Hunebelle
  - The Most Wanted Man, directed by Henri Verneuil
- 1954 :
  - Destinées (uncredited), directed by Christian-Jaque, Jean Delannoy and Marcello Pagliero
  - Sang et lumières, directed by Georges Rouquier
  - Fun in the Barracks, directed by Paolo Moffa
  - Poisson d'avril (1954), directed by Gilles Grangier
  - Quay of Blondes, directed by Paul Cadéac
  - Série noire, directed by Pierre Foucaud
- 1955 :
  - Gas-Oil, directed by Gilles Grangier
- 1956 :
  - Until the Last One, directed by Pierre Billon
  - Blood to the Head, directed by Gilles Grangier
  - Mannequins of Paris, directed by André Hunebelle
  - Short Head, directed by Norbert Carbonnaux
- 1957 :
  - Le rouge est mis, directed by Gilles Grangier
  - Fugitive in Saigon, directed by Marcel Camus
  - Three Days to Live, directed by Gilles Grangier
  - Retour de manivelle, directed by Denys de La Patellière
  - Maigret tend un piège, directed by Jean Delannoy
- 1958 :
  - Les Misérables, directed by Jean-Paul Le Chanois
  - Le Désordre et la Nuit, directed by Gilles Grangier
  - Les Grandes Familles, directed by Denys de la Patellière
  - Marchands de rien, directed by Daniel Lecomte (court-métrage)
- 1959 :
  - Le fauve est lâché (uncredited), directed by Maurice Labro
  - Archimède le clochard, directed by Gilles Grangier
  - Pourquoi viens-tu si tard?, directed by Henri Decoin
  - Maigret et l'Affaire Saint-Fiacre, directed by Jean Delannoy
  - 125 Rue Montmartre, directed by Gilles Grangier
  - Rue des prairies, directed by Denys de la Patellière
  - Babette s'en va-t-en guerre, directed by Christian-Jaque
  - Eyes of Love, directed by Denys de la Patellière
  - Vel d'Hiv', directed by Guy Blanc (Court-métrage)
  - La Bête à l'affût, directed by Pierre Chenal
  - Péchés de jeunesse, directed by Louis Duchesne

=== 1960s ===
- 1960 :
  - Le Baron de l'écluse, directed by Jean Delannoy
  - La Française et l'amour, film à sketches, « L'Adultère », directed by Henri Verneuil
  - Les Vieux de la vieille, directed by Gilles Grangier
  - Spécial Noël : Jean Gabin (TV), directed by Frédéric Rossif
  - Le Président, directed by Henri Verneuil
- 1961 :
  - Taxi for Tobruk, directed by Denys de la Patellière
  - Les lions sont lâchés, directed by Henri Verneuil
  - Les Amours célèbres - sketch « Les Comédiennes », directed by Michel Boisrond
  - Le cave se rebiffe, directed by Gilles Grangier
  - Le Bateau d'Émile, directed by Denys de la Patellière
- 1962 :
  - Un singe en hiver, directed by Henri Verneuil
  - The Gentleman from Epsom, directed by Gilles Grangier
  - Le Diable et les Dix Commandements, directed by Julien Duvivier
  - Le Voyage à Biarritz (uncredited), directed by Gilles Grangier
- 1963 :
  - Mélodie en sous-sol, directed by Henri Verneuil
  - Carambolages, directed by Marcel Bluwal
  - Les Tontons flingueurs, directed by Georges Lautner
  - Teuf-teuf (TV), directed by Georges Folgoas
  - Des pissenlits par la racine, directed by Georges Lautner
  - Cent mille dollars au soleil, directed by Henri Verneuil
- 1964 :
  - Marcia Nuziale, directed by Marco Ferreri
  - Les Barbouzes, directed by Georges Lautner
  - Une foule enfin réunie, directed by Monique Chappelle (short movie)
  - Un drôle de caïd or Une souris chez les hommes, directed by Jacques Poitrenaud
  - Par un beau matin d'été, directed by Jacques Deray
  - La Chasse à l'homme, directed by Edouard Molinaro
- 1965 :
  - La Métamorphose des cloportes, directed by Pierre Granier-Deferre (scenario co-written with Albert Simonin, from Alphonse Boudard)
  - When the Pheasants Pass, directed by Edouard Molinaro
  - How to Keep the Red Lamp Burning, directed by Gilles Grangier & Georges Lautner
  - The Dictator's Guns (uncredited), directed by Claude Sautet
  - Ne nous fâchons pas, directed by Georges Lautner
- 1966 :
  - Tendre Voyou, directed by Jean Becker
  - Un idiot à Paris, directed by Serge Korber
  - Sale temps pour les mouches, directed by Guy Lefranc
  - Johnny Banco, directed by Yves Allégret
- 1967 :
  - Le Pacha, directed by Georges Lautner
  - All Mad About Him, directed by Norbert Carbonnaux
  - Max le débonnaire (TV show), directed by Gilles Grangier, Yves Allégret and Jacques Deray
  - La Grande Sauterelle, directed by Georges Lautner
  - La Petite Vertu, directed by Serge Korber
- 1968 :
  - Fleur d'oseille, directed by Georges Lautner
  - Leontine
- 1969 :
  - Sous le signe du taureau, directed by Gilles Grangier

=== 1970s ===
- 1973 :
  - Baxter!, directed by Lionel Jeffries
- 1974 :
  - Comment réussir quand on est con et pleurnichard
  - OK patron (uncredited), directed by Claude Vital
- 1975 :
  - Incorrigible, directed by Philippe de Broca
- 1976 :
  - Le Grand Escogriffe, directed by Claude Pinoteau
  - Le Corps de mon ennemi, directed by Henri Verneuil
- 1977 :
  - Tendre Poulet, directed by Philippe de Broca
  - Mort d'un pourri, directed by Georges Lautner
  - L'Animal, directed by Claude Zidi
- 1978 :
  - Le Cavaleur, directed by Philippe de Broca
- 1979 :
  - Flic ou voyou, directed by Georges Lautner
  - Les Égouts du paradis, directed by José Giovanni
  - La Fabuleuse histoire de Roland-Garros, directed by Charles Gérard
  - Le Guignolo, directed by Georges Lautner
  - On a volé la cuisse de Jupiter, directed by Philippe de Broca

=== 1980s ===
- 1980 :
  - Le Coucou, directed by Francesco Massaro
  - L'Entourloupe, directed by Gérard Pirès
  - Pile ou Face, directed by Robert Enrico
- 1981 :
  - Le Professionnel, directed by Georges Lautner
  - Garde à vue, directed by Claude Miller
  - Est-ce bien raisonnable ?, directed by Georges Lautner
- 1982 :
  - Espion, lève-toi, directed by Yves Boisset
- 1983 :
  - Mortelle randonnée, directed by Claude Miller
  - Vive la sociale !, directed by Gérard Mordillat
  - Le Marginal, directed by Jacques Deray
- 1984 :
  - Canicule, directed by Yves Boisset
  - Les Morfalous, directed by Henri Verneuil
- 1985 :
  - On ne meurt que deux fois, directed by Jacques Deray from the novel of Robin Cook
  - La Cage aux folles III, « Elles » se marient, directed by Georges Lautner.

== Directing filmography ==
- Leontine (1968)
- A Golden Widow (1969)
- Elle boit pas, elle fume pas, elle drague pas, mais... elle cause ! (1970)
- Le Cri du cormoran, le soir au-dessus des jonques (1971)
- Le drapeau noir flotte sur la marmite (1971)
- Elle cause plus... elle flingue (1972)
- Comment réussir quand on est con et pleurnichard (1974)
- Vive la France (documentary, 1974)
- Bons Baisers... à lundi (1975)

== See also ==
- Chantons sous l'Occupation, a documentary film
