= Maurice Biraud =

French actor (1922–1982)

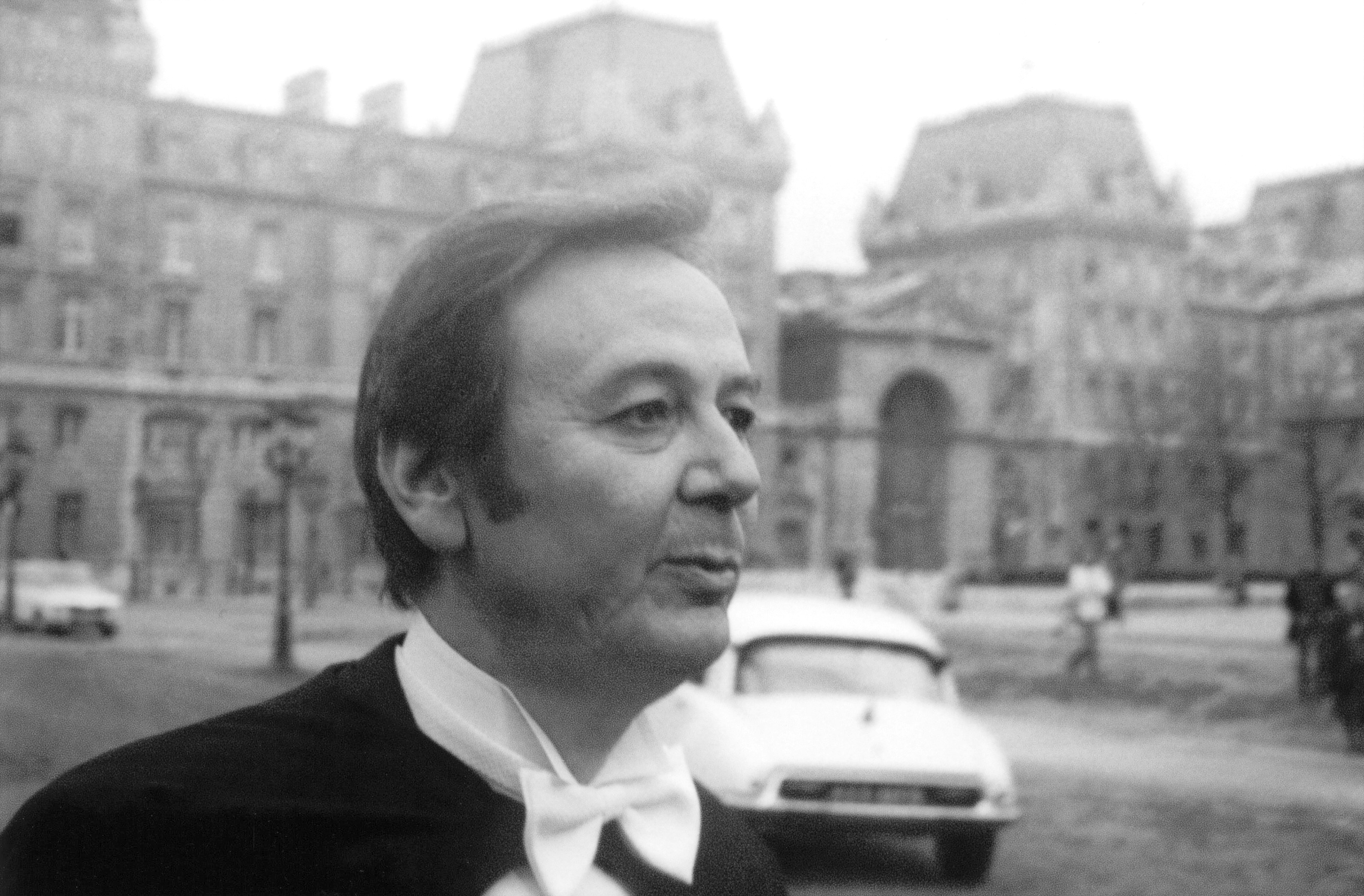
- Maurice Biraud photographed in 1976 by Olivier Meyer
- Born: 3 March 1922; Paris, France
- Died: 24 December 1982 (aged 60); Boulogne-Billancourt, France
- Occupation: Actor
- Years active: 1951-1982

Maurice Biraud (3 March 1922 – 24 December 1982) was a French film actor. He appeared in 90 films between 1951 and 1982. Biraud was born on 3 March 1922 in Paris. He married actress Françoise Soulié in 1956. He suffered a heart attack at a red light while driving his car on Avenue Marceau in Paris and was taken to the Ambroise-Paré-Hospital in Boulogne-Billancourt, Hauts-de-Seine, where he was certified dead on 24 December 1982.

== Selected filmography ==
- Le roi des camelots (1951)
- Mr. Peek-a-Boo (1951) - Un collégue de Léon (uncredited)
- Une fille à croquer (1951)
- Jamais deux sans trois (1952)
- La marche (1952)
- The Red Head (1952)
- The Happiest of Men (1952) - Le jeune avocat
- Wonderful Mentality (1953)
- The Slave (1953) - Le photographe
- His Father's Portrait (1953) - Didier
- Quay of Blondes (1954) - Laurent
- Mam'zelle Nitouche (1954) - Un réserviste (uncredited)
- Le Secret d'Hélène Marimon (1954)
- Poisson d'avril (1954) - Le vendeur du bazar
- Les deux font la paire (1954) - L'avocat
- Pas de coup dur pour Johnny (1955)
- L'Homme et l'Enfant (1956) - (uncredited)
- Trois jours à vivre (1957)
- Donnez-moi ma chance (1957) - Un employé de Gilbert
- Charmants garçons (1957) - Récitant / Commentator (voice)
- It's All Adam's Fault (1958)
- First of May (1958) - Blanchot
- Pierrot la tendresse (1960) - Maternati
- Candide ou l'optimisme au XXe siècle (1960) - Le résident hollandais (uncredited)
- Taxi for Tobruk (1961) - François Gensac
- Le cave se rebiffe (1961) - Robert Mideau
- Le Petit Garçon de l'ascenseur (1962)
- The Seventh Juror (1962) - Veterinarian
- Le monte-charge (1962) - Adolphe Ferry
- Le Diable et les Dix Commandements (1962) - Louis (segment "Homicide point ne seras")
- The Eye of the Monocle (1962) - Martigue
- Pourquoi Paris ? (1962) - Denis, l'hôtelier
- Any Number Can Win (1963) - Louis Naudin
- La Soupe aux poulets (1963)
- Cherchez l'idole (1964) - Un invité au spectacle de Sylvie Vartan (uncredited)
- Des pissenlits par la racine (1964) - Jo Arengeot
- Une souris chez les hommes (1964) - Francis
- The Adventures of Salavin (1964) - Louis Salavin
- La Métamorphose des cloportes (1965) - Arthur dit Le Mou
- La Grande Sauterelle (1967) - Alfred
- Fleur d'oseille (1967) - Commissaire Verdier
- Le Cri du cormoran le soir au-dessus des jonques (1971) - Le chauffeur de taxi
- La guerre des espions (1972) - Jérôme Nimo
- Five Leaf Clover (1972) - Georges-André Constant
- Elle cause plus... elle flingue (1972) - Herbert
- Le complot (1973) - Brunet
- Le Concierge (1973) - Martin Massoulier
- A Slightly Pregnant Man (1973) - Lamarie
- The Train (1973) - Maurice - le déserteur
- Le Permis de conduire (1974) - Le premier moniteur
- O.K. patron (1974) - Leroy
- La Rivale (1974) - Jean-Claude
- Salut les frangines (1975) - Monsieur Chotard
- Flic Story (1975) - Le patron de l'hôtel Saint-Appoline
- The Gypsy (1975) - Pierrot le naïf
- Jackpot (1975)
- Deux imbéciles heureux (1976) - Le docteur
- Bartleby (1976) - Dindon
- Gloria (1977) - Stéphane Perreau
- C'est dingue... mais on y va (1979) - Monsieur Castagnet
- La Bande du Rex (1980) - Le commissaire Raoul Fleury
- Pourquoi pas nous ? (1981) - M. Simon, le patron
- Beau-père (1981) - Le camionneur témoin de l'accident / Accident Witness (uncredited)
- Un dimanche de flic (1983) - Fred
