= Operation Gold Ingot =

- Directed by: Georges Lautner
- Written by: Pierre Laroche; Georges Lautner
- Produced by: Maurice Juven
- Starring: Martine Carol
- Cinematography: Maurice Fellous
- Music by: Georges Delerue
- Distributed by: Variety Distribution
- Release date: 1962
- Language: French

Operation Gold Ingot (French: En plein cirage, Italian: Operazione: Gold Ingot) is a 1962 French-Italian heist film directed by Georges Lautner and starring Martine Carol. It is based on a novel by M.G. Braun.

== Cast ==
- Martine Carol as Kathy
- Francis Blanche as Commissioner Camille Fellous
- Félix Marten as Félix
- Alberto Lionello as René
- Nico Pepe as Sforza
- Yves Barsacq as le gangster
- Pierre Barouh as René
- Henri Cogan as un truand
- Ida Stuart as Gilda
- Bernard Blier
- Gaia Germani
