= Short Head =

- Theatrical release poster
- Directed by: Norbert Carbonnaux
- Written by: Michel Audiard; Norbert Carbonnaux; Albert Simonin
- Produced by: Jean-Paul Guibert
- Starring: Fernand Gravey; Micheline Dax; Jean Richard
- Cinematography: Roger Dormoy
- Edited by: Jacqueline Thiédot
- Music by: Jean Prodomidès
- Production company: Intermondia Films
- Distributed by: CCFC
- Release date: 10 October 1956
- Running time: 88 minutes
- Country: France
- Language: French

Short Head (French: Courte tête) is a 1956 French comedy film directed by Norbert Carbonnaux, written by Michel Audiard and starring Fernand Gravey, Micheline Dax and Jean Richard. The film is known under the alternative title Photo Finish.

It was shot at the Photosonor Studios in Paris. The film's sets were designed by the art director Jacques Colombier.

== Synopsis ==
Two swindlers try to cheat a provincial poultry magnate by getting him to bet on a sure loser in a major horse race.

== Cast ==
- Fernand Gravey as Olivier Parker, a notorious crook. posing as an equestrian coach
- Micheline Dax as Lola d'Héricourt, a venturer
- Jean Richard as Ferdinand Galiveau, poultry dealer and racegoer
- Jacques Duby as Amédée Lucas aka fake jockey "Teddy Morton"
- Darry Cowl as the receptionist at the hotel "Lutécia"
- Hubert Deschamps as Le serveur 'Gay Paris'
- Max Révol as the general agent for starch
- Robert Murzeau as the taylor, also a racegoer
- Jacques Dufilho as the stable-boy
- Harry-Max as Cyril Mauvoisin, l'entraîneur
- Pascal Mazzotti as Le maître d'hôtel
- Annick Tanguy as La danseuse de Mambo
- Louis de Funès as Father Graziani, a fake monk
- Guy Bedos as Fred Campuche
- Paul Bisciglia as Un chasseur de l'hôte

== Bibliography ==
- Ginette Vincendeau. Stars and Stardom in French Cinema. Bloomsbury Publishing, 2000.
