= Espion, lève-toi =

- Directed by: Yves Boisset
- Written by: Michel Audiard; Yves Boisset; Claude Veillot
- Cinematography: Jean Boffety
- Music by: Ennio Morricone
- Release date: 1982 (France)
- Country: France

Espion, lève-toi is a 1982 French spy thriller film directed by Yves Boisset about a sleeper agent in Zurich, based on the thriller Chance Awakening (1977) by George Markstein.

This film was first supposed to be directed by Andrzej Żuławski, but in the end it was Yves Boisset who did it. This was the second time that Yves Boisset worked together with Ennio Morricone, after their 1972 film Plot.

== Awards ==
- 1982 – Nomination for best film at Mystfest

== Cast and roles ==
- Lino Ventura - Sébastien Grenier
- Michel Piccoli - Jean-Paul Chance
- Bruno Cremer - Alain Richard
- Bernard Fresson - Henri Marchand
- Marc Mazza - Ramos Bavila
- Roger Jendly - Le commissaire Lohmann
- Heinz Bennent - Meyer
- Krystyna Janda - Anna Gretz, compagne de Sébastien Grenier
- Beate Kopp - La secrétaire de Grenier
- Christian Baltauss - Le bibliothécaire
- Kurt Bigger - Alfred Zimmer
- Jean-Paul Franky - Rudy la blonde
- Yves Boisset - L'adjoint de Richard
- Daniel Plancherel - L'inspecteur Vogel
- Philippe Brizard - Le collaborateur de Grenier

== Crew ==
- Director: Yves Boisset
- First Assistant Director:Urs Egger
- Script: Yves Boisset, Michel Audiard and Claude Veillot
- Producer: Norbert Saada for Cathala Productions and TF1 Films Productions
- Production manager: Georges Vallon, Marcel Just
- Music: Ennio Morricone
- Camera: Jean Boffety, Pierre-William Glenn
- Editor: Albert Jurgenson, Jean-François Naudon
- Art director: Serge Douy
- Set decorator: André Labussière
- Special effects: Daniel Braunschweig
- Propmaster: Daniel Garbade
- Make-up artist: Christiane Sauvage
- Sound: Pierre Lenoir, Denis Carquin
