= André Pousse =

French actor (1919–2005)

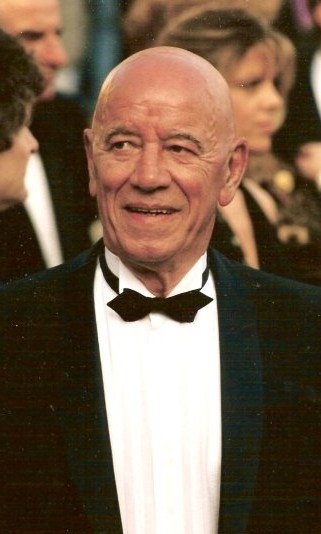
- Born: 20 October 1919; Paris, France
- Died: 9 September 2005 (aged 85); Gassin, France
- Occupation: Actor

André Pousse (20 October 1919 – 9 September 2005) was a noted French actor and, in his youth, also a notable cyclist.

== Biography ==
While primarily known as a leading French actor, André Pousse began his professional career as a cyclist (primarily track). His greatest cycling achievements took place in the infamous Vél d'Hiv (Vélodrome d'Hiver or Winter Velodrome), in Paris, where he won the prestigious "six days of Vél d'Hiv" races from 1942 to 1949. Indeed, Pousse is the record holder in this event, and will remain so as the Vél d'Hiv has since been torn down. The "race," as it was, took place in front of 20,000 spectators and was a major French cultural and sporting event. It lasted six days and nights and, until two-man teams were established, it was apt to land exhausted participants in hospital, as Pousse himself remarked. Alain Delon, who as a child attended the races as an ardent admirer of Pousse, remembers competing with other children for the honor of bringing Pousse his bicycle at the beginning of a race. André Pousse retired from the track in 1950; and later, from 1960, went on to his better known years as an actor in cinema and television. He played mostly gangster roles in police films of the time. For many years, he was the artistic director of the Moulin Rouge in Paris and many other establishments, including the Casino of Lebanon. He also served as the agent of many French actors.

== Selected filmography ==
- D'où viens-tu, Johnny? (1963) - M. Franck
- Ne nous fâchons pas (1966) - Un truand en fuite
- An Idiot in Paris (1967) - Le chauffeur de taxi
- Fleur d'oseille (1967) - Albert Roza
- Max le débonnaire (1967, TV Series) - (segment "De quoi je me mêle")
- Le Pacha (1968) - Quinquin
- Leontine (1968) - Fred
- Catherine, il suffit d'un amour (1968) - Barnabé
- A Golden Widow (1969) - Pierre Déricourt de Savignac dit Pierrot le Farceur
- Le Clan des Siciliens (1969) - Malik
- Des vacances en or (1969) - Constant
- Trop petit mon ami (1970) - L'inspecteur Terrell
- Tumuc Humac (1970) - Bréchet
- Comptes à rebours (1971) - Gi
- Le Drapeau noir flotte sur la marmite (1971) - Balloche
- Elle cause plus, elle flingue (1972) - Max
- Un flic (1972) - Marc Albouis
- Quelques messieurs trop tranquilles (1973) - Gérard
- L'Insolent (1973) - Milan
- Au théâtre ce soir (1973, TV Series) - Crochard
- Profession: Aventuriers (1973) - Le juge
- OK patron (1974) - Charles Laurent
- Bons baisers... à lundi (1974) - L'automobiliste (uncredited)
- Flic Story (1975) - Jean-Baptiste Buisson
- Bons Baisers de Hong Kong (1975) - René
- Attention les yeux! (1976) - Rotberger
- Oublie-moi, Mandoline (1976) - Eugène de Charonne
- Chantons sous l'Occupation (1976, Documentary) - Himself
- Drôles de Zèbres (1977) - L'homme de mauvais conseil
- Le Cœur froid (1977) - Le docteur
- La Septième compagnie au clair de lune (1977) - Lambert
- Madame le juge (1978, TV Series) - L'inspecteur Bastiani
- Le Sacrifice (1978, TV Movie) - Sydney
- Les Égouts du paradis (1979) - Le chauve
- Le Corbillard de Jules (1982) - M. Lucien
- Mettez du sel sur la queue de l'oiseau pour l'attraper (1982, TV Movie) - Hubert de Caffagnac
- Deux heures moins le quart avant Jésus-Christ (1982) - Un centurion
- Le Privé (1986, TV Series) - Rino
- Paparoff se dédouble (1988-1990, TV Series) - M. Robert
- Le Retour de Lemmy Caution (1989, TV Movie) - Le commissaire Schmidt
- Cluedo (1994-1995, TV Series) - Colonel Moutarde
- Requiem pour un con damné (1994, Short)
- Moi j'aime Albert (1996, Short) - Albert
- En panne (1996, Short)
- Opération Bugs Bunny (1997, TV Movie)
- Deux bananes flambées et l'addition (1998, Short) - Lambert
- L'Âme-sœur (1999) - Archbishop Lacaze
- Comme un poisson hors de l'eau (1999) - Le Faucheur
- Qui mange quoi? (2002, TV Movie) - Etienne
- Frank Riva (2003, TV Series) - Paul Pontevecchio
- Le Plein des sens (2004, Short)
- Qui mange quand? (2004, TV Movie) - Étienne, dit 'Le tatoué' (uncredited) (final film role)

== Written works ==
- J'balance pas, j'raconte (autobiography with Laurent Chollet) (2005)
- Histoires sur le pouce (2001)
- Touchez pas aux souvenirs (1989)
