= Joëlle Bernard =

French actress

- Born: 14 August 1928; Vitry-le-François, France
- Died: 23 March 1977 (aged 48); Nogent-sur-Marne, France
- Occupation: Actress
- Years active: 1946–1977

Joëlle Bernard (1928–1977) was a French film and television actress.

== Partial filmography ==
- Lunegarde (1946)
- Quai des Orfèvres (1947) - Ginette (uncredited)
- To the Eyes of Memory (1948) - (uncredited)
- Miquette (1950) - Lili - une comédienne
- Here Is the Beauty (1950) - (uncredited)
- Beware of Blondes (1950) - Une entraîneuse (uncredited)
- Les maîtres-nageurs (1951) - Dorothy
- Si ça vous chante (1951)
- Casque d'Or (1952) - Une fille à la guinguette (uncredited)
- Desperate Decision (1952) - La femme ivre
- The Long Teeth (1953) - Raymonde Josserand
- Rue de l'Estrapade (1953) - La voisine de Robert (uncredited)
- Horizons sans fin (1953) - (uncredited)
- The Slave (1953) - Jenny
- Children of Love (1953) - Dolly
- Stain in the Snow (1954) - Une fille
- The Price of Love (1955) - Suzy
- Sophie et le crime (1955) - La fille au restaurant (uncredited)
- Le Long des trottoirs (1956) - Monique
- O.S.S. 117 n'est pas mort (1957)
- Three Days to Live (1957) - Mauricette
- Ces dames préfèrent le mambo (1957) - Mamie O'Brien
- Women's Prison (1958) - Une détenue
- Pêcheur d'Islande (1959) - Jenny
- Les Amants de demain (1959) - Yvonne
- Sergent X (1960)
- Interpol Against X (1960) - Lucy
- Callaghan remet ça (1961)
- Emile's Boat (1962) - La patronne de La Marine
- The Gentleman from Epsom (1962) - Ginette
- Du mouron pour les petits oiseaux (1963) - Gladys
- Graduation Year (1964) - La fille du "Rendez-vous des chasseurs"
- Diary of a Chambermaid (1964)
- Angelique and the King (1966) - La Voisin (uncredited)
- Sept hommes et une garce (1967) - La cantinière
- Adélaïde (1968) - Janine
- The Adding Machine (1969) - Janine
- L'alliance (1970) - (uncredited)
- Ils (1970) - Isabelle
- Comptes à rebours (1971) - Suzy
- Le Viager (1972) - La prosttituée
- Borsalino & Co. (1974) - Une maquerelle (uncredited)
- Les Enquetes du Commissaire Maigret (1974, TV Series) - Ernestine, dite 'La grande perche'
- Speak to Me of Love (1975) - La mère de Daniel
- Les conquistadores (1976)
- Le guêpier (1976) - Sarah

== Bibliography ==
- Edward Baron Turk. Child of Paradise: Marcel Carné and the Golden Age of French Cinema. Harvard University Press, 1989.
- http://kmalden.centerblog.net/108-joelle-bernard-1928-1977
