= The Dictator's Guns =

L'Arme à gauche
- French theatrical release poster
- Directed by: Claude Sautet
- Written by: Charles Williams (novel Aground); Claude Sautet; Michel Lévine; Fouli Elia; José Luis Dibildos
- Produced by: Jacques Bar; Pierre Camo; Franco Cristaldi
- Starring: Lino Ventura; Sylva Koscina
- Cinematography: Walter Wottitz
- Edited by: Jacqueline Thiédot
- Music by: Eddie Barclay; Michel Colombier
- Distributed by: Océanic Films
- Release date: 1965
- Running time: 103 minutes
- Countries: France; Italy
- Language: French

The Dictator's Guns (French: L'Arme à gauche) is a 1965 French, Spanish and Italian international co-production crime film directed by Claude Sautet and shot in France and Spain. It was based on the 1960 novel Aground by Charles Williams.

== Plot ==
In Santo Domingo, a Mr Hendrix asks the experienced skipper Cournot to look over the “Dragoon”, a ketch being sold by a widow in New York called Mrs Osborne. The Dominican police then arrest Cournot because Hendrix and the “Dragoon” have both disappeared, leaving several corpses on the shore. When Mrs Osborne flies in and corroborates his story, he is freed.

She wants to find her stolen vessel and Cournot suggests a seaplane pilot in Kingston, Jamaica, who flies the two in search of where the “Dragoon” was last reported. They find it aground, close to an exposed sandbank. On going aboard, Cournot and Mrs Osborne are taken captive by a vicious gun runner called Morrison who with his gang is already holding Hendrix and has overloaded the “Dragoon” with weapons and ammunition for delivery to Central America.

Morrison makes Cournot do the exhausting work of ferrying the heavy cases one by one to the sandbank, aiming to refloat the vessel and then reload it. Disputes among the crooks lead to Morrison being left alone on the sandbank with all the hardware while Cournot, Mrs Osborne and a wounded Hendrix are on the boat. Morrison keeps the “Dragoon” under constant rifle fire, hoping to hit the humans and disable the craft. He succeeds in holing the petrol tank, flooding the vessel with fuel which could go up at any moment. While Cournot is trying to pump it out by hand, Morrison swims aboard and in a final confrontation is killed. A rising tide floats the “Dragoon” so, hoisting the sails, Cournot sets course for Panama, a place where no questions will be asked.

== Cast ==
- Lino Ventura ... Jacques Cournot
- Sylva Koscina ... Rae Osborne
- Alberto de Mendoza ... Hendrix
- Leo Gordon ... Morrison
- Antonio Casas
- Antonio Martín ... Ruiz
- Ángel del Pozo
- José Jaspe
- Ángel Menéndez
- Jean-Claude Bercq... Avery
- Jack Léonard ... Keefer
