= Jacques Bar =

French film producer

Jacques Bar (12 September 1921, Châteauroux – 19 January 2009, Boulogne-Billancourt) was a French film producer, who produced over 80 films.

== Select credits ==
- Branquignol (1949)
- Murders (1950)
- My Seal and Them (1951)
- Young Love (1951)
- The Adventures of Mandrin (1952)
- The Man in My Life (1952)
- Crazy for Love (1952)
- I Vitelloni (1953)
- The Slave (1953)
- The Baker of Valorgue (1953)
- House of Ricordi (1954)
- The Heroes Are Tired (1955)
- Spring, Autumn and Love (1955)
- Fernandel the Dressmaker (1956)
- Typhoon Over Nagasaki (1957)
- Murder at 45 R.P.M. (1960)
- Bridge to the Sun (1961)
- Any Number Can Win (1962)
- The Gentleman from Epsom (1962)
- The Day and the Hour (1963)
- Rififi in Tokyo (1963)
- Champagne for Savages (1964)
- Joy House (1964)
- The Dictator's Guns (1965)
- The Suspects (1974)
- My Father, the Hero (1991)
- The Count of Monte Cristo (1998)
