= Burning Fuse =

- Directed by: Henri Decoin
- Written by: Henri Decoin; Jacques Robert; Albert Simonin
- Produced by: François Rigaud; Jean Tachard
- Starring: Raymond Pellegrin; Charles Vanel; Peter van Eyck
- Cinematography: Pierre Montazel
- Edited by: Claude Durand
- Music by: Louis Gasté; Maurice Jarre; Philippe-Gérard
- Production companies: Galliera Films; Gallus Films
- Distributed by: Sofradis
- Release date: 27 February 1957
- Running time: 98 minutes
- Countries: France; Italy
- Language: French

Burning Fuse (French: Le feu aux poudres) is a 1957 French-Italian thriller film directed by Henri Decoin and starring Raymond Pellegrin, Charles Vanel and Peter van Eyck. It was shot at the Billancourt Studios in Paris. The films sets were designed by the art director René Renoux.

== Synopsis ==
Lola, the wife of a notorious arms dealer Pédro Wassevitch is attracted to a young painter Ludovic. Unknown to her he has been sent to infiltrate Wassevitch's operation which both a rival and the police are interested in.

== Cast ==
- Raymond Pellegrin as Ludovic 'Ludo' Ferrier
- Charles Vanel as Albatrasse
- Peter van Eyck as Pédro Wassevitch
- Françoise Fabian as Lola Wassevitch
- Lino Ventura as Legentil
- Darío Moreno as Jeff
- Lyla Rocco as Brigitte
- Jacqueline Maillan as Mme Catherine, l'aubergiste
- Mathilde Casadesus as Mimi
- Pierre-Louis as L' inspecteur Fougeron
- Roland Armontel as Antoine
- Henri Cogan as Matt
- Michel Flamme as Un inspecteur
- Michel Jourdan as Dédé
- Pascal Mazzotti as Le pharmacien
- Georges Bayle
- François Chaumette as L'ingénieur du son
- Nino Crisman
- Le Hang
- Olivier Darrieux as Un inspecteur
- Lisa Jouvet as La serveuse
- Marthe Mercadier as L'aubergiste
- Albert Simonin as Albert

== Bibliography ==
- Davidson, John & Hake, Sabine. Framing the Fifties: Cinema in a Divided Germany. Berghahn Books, 2007.
