= Emile's Boat =

- Directed by: Denys de La Patellière
- Written by: Michel Audiard; Albert Valentin; Denys de La Patellière
- Based on: Emile's Boat by Georges Simenon
- Produced by: André Cultet
- Starring: Annie Girardot; Lino Ventura; Michel Simon
- Cinematography: Robert Juillard
- Edited by: Jacqueline Thiédot
- Music by: Jean Prodromidès
- Production companies: Filmsonor; Intermondia Films; Vides Cinematografica
- Distributed by: Cinédis
- Release date: 3 March 1962
- Running time: 98 minutes
- Countries: France; Italy
- Language: French

Emile's Boat (French: Le Bateau d'Émile) is a 1962 French-Italian drama film directed by Denys de La Patellière and starring Annie Girardot, Lino Ventura and Michel Simon. It is based on the eponymous 1954 novel by Georges Simenon.

It was made at the Epinay Studios in Paris while location shooting took place in La Rochelle. The film's sets were designed by the art director Maurice Colasson.

== Cast ==
- Annie Girardot as Fernande
- Lino Ventura as Émile Bouet
- Michel Simon as Charles-Edmond Larmentiel
- Pierre Brasseur as François Larmentiel
- Jacques Monod as Maître Lamazure
- Édith Scob as Claude Larmentiel
- Roger Dutoit as Patron du bistrot
- Joëlle Bernard as La patronne de La Marine
- Roger Pelletier as Simon Mougin
- Etienne Bierry as Marcelin
- André Certes as Lucien Beauvoisin
- Jean Solar as Albert Vicart
- Pierre Vielhescaze as Le marchand de radio
- Guy Humbert as L'agent
- Marcel Bernier as Plevedic
- Yves Gabrielli as L'employé d'Air France
- Derville as Léon
- Jean-Louis Tristan as Le valet
