= 125 Rue Montmartre =

1959 film

- Directed by: Gilles Grangier
- Written by: Michel Audiard; André Gillois; Gilles Grangier; Jacques Robert
- Based on: 125 Rue Montmartre by André Gillois
- Produced by: Lucien Viard
- Starring: Lino Ventura; Andréa Parisy; Robert Hirsch
- Cinematography: Jacques Lemare
- Edited by: Jacqueline Sadoul
- Music by: Jean Yatove
- Production companies: Orex Films; Société Nouvelle Pathé Cinéma
- Distributed by: Pathé Consortium Cinéma
- Release date: 9 September 1959
- Running time: 85 minutes
- Country: France
- Language: French

125 Rue Montmartre is a 1959 French crime drama film directed by Gilles Grangier and starring Lino Ventura, Andréa Parisy and Robert Hirsch. It was shot at the Boulogne Studios in Paris and location shooting around Montmartre. The film's sets were designed by the art director Robert Bouladoux.

== Cast ==
- Lino Ventura as Pascal
- Andréa Parisy as Catherine Barrachet
- Robert Hirsch as Didier Barrachet
- Dora Doll as Germaine Montillier, dite Mémène
- Lucien Raimbourg as Victor
- Pierre Mirat as Le brigadier
- Alfred Adam as Phillipe Barrachet
- Jean Desailly as Commissaire Dodelot
- Jean Juillard as l'inspecteur Michel
- Pierre Collet as un inspecteur

== Influence ==
The film's title was later appropriated by the German emo band 125, Rue Montmartre.

== Bibliography ==
- Hewitt, Nicholas. Montmartre: A Cultural History. Oxford University Press, 2017.
- Palmer, Tim. Tales of the Underworld: Jean-Pierre Melville and the 1950s French Cinema. University of Wisconsin, 2003.
- Rège, Philippe. Encyclopedia of French Film Directors, Volume 1. Scarecrow Press, 2009.
