= Taxi for Tobruk =

- Directed by: Denys de La Patellière
- Written by: Michel Audiard; René Havard; Denys de La Patellière
- Produced by: Denys de La Patellière
- Starring: Charles Aznavour; Lino Ventura; Hardy Krüger
- Cinematography: Marcel Grignon; Salvador Torres Garriga
- Edited by: Jacqueline Thiédot
- Music by: Georges Garvarentz
- Production companies: Franco London Films; Gaumont; Continental Film; Procusa
- Distributed by: Gaumont Distribution (France); Europa Filmverleih (West Germany)
- Release date: 9 May 1961
- Running time: 95 minutes
- Countries: France; West Germany; Spain
- Languages: French; German; English

Taxi for Tobruk (French: Un taxi pour Tobrouk) is a 1961 war film directed by Denys de La Patellière and starring Charles Aznavour, Lino Ventura and Hardy Krüger. It was made as a co-production between France, Spain and West Germany.

The story takes place during World War II in the North African desert at the Battle of El Alamein. Location shooting took place in Almería in Spain. The film's sets were designed by the art director Paul-Louis Boutié.

== Plot ==
The film begins with an introduction to the night of Christmas Eve 1941 and shows how the various characters in the film experience it:

- Captain Ludwig von Stegel leaves his family at his castle in Pomerania;
- Petty Officer Théo Dumas is welcomed by an English family in London while thinking about his bistro in the Faubourg Montmartre;
- François Gensac leaves his grandmother in Ablis for London "out of boredom";
- Samuel Goldmann leaves France on a boat to avoid anti-Semitic persecution;
- Paolo Ramirez, sentenced to death, prepares his escape from prison.

The film continues in October 1942 in Tobruk, in German-occupied Libya. An Free French LRDG commando has just carried out an attack on a German position: the lieutenant in command has been killed, and the four remaining men are left to fend for themselves.

The commandos make their way out of Tobruk towards El Alamein but get lost in the desert. A German aircraft flies over them but does not attack the vehicle or its occupants. Ramirez then fires at the plane with a machine gun. He hits it, but the plane has time to set fire to the vehicle. The commandos try to save their radio set and water, but to no avail.

Without food, water, or radio, they decide to split up: Dumas and Ramirez decide to walk and try everything; Gensac and Goldmann choose to stay and wait for death. The four of them finally set off aimlessly in search of something that might save them.

After a long walk, they discover the tracks of a vehicle. They ambush a German patrol, shooting the four German soldiers, and head for the car. They then discover a German officer (von Stegel) who had escaped the massacre. After burying the German soldiers, they set off for the British lines with their prisoner.

Von Stegel warns the commandos that they are heading for an area of soft sands, but they don't listen and quickly get stuck. Running out of fuel, they close in on the German lines. Having managed to join an enemy convoy where they can steal supplies, they leave as a French prisoner, recognizing Goldmann, instinctively calls out his name.

During another silting-up, Captain von Stegel seizes the vehicle, takes the four Frenchmen prisoners, and heads back towards Tobruk. Now at the wheel, quartermaster Dumas deliberately silts up the vehicle, and the four Frenchmen refuse to free it. A long period of observation followed. The captain, alone against four, finally falls asleep, and the four Frenchmen regain control of the situation.

By chance, they find themselves having to cross a minefield in the middle of the desert. Once engaged, they hesitate to continue and retrace their steps. The German saves Dumas from being blown up by a mine, but Gensac, who had also disembarked to help Dumas, is seriously wounded by an explosion.

Near El Alamein, they stop to tend to François' wounds. Dumas becomes unwilling to hand the German officer over to the authorities, and steps away from the group to think about the ways he could let his escape. At this moment, an allied armored vehicle spots their German car, and destroys it with a direct hit, killing all four occupants. Dumas is the only survivor.

The film ends with a victory parade, where a distraught ex-quartermaster Dumas, moved by the memories of the expedition, is roundly rebuked by a spectator for keeping his cap on as the troops pass. "Excuse me," he replies, "I was thinking of something else.".

== Cast ==
- Hardy Krüger as Le capitaine Ludwig von Stegel
- Lino Ventura as le brigadier Theo Dumas
- Maurice Biraud as François Gensac
- Charles Aznavour as Samuel Goldmann
- Germán Cobos as Jean Ramirez
- Ellen Bahl as Frau von Stegel
- Roland Malet as Convict with Ramirez
- Carlos Mendy as German Soldier in Desert with von Stegel
- Jacques Préboist as Convict with Ramirez
- Lorenzo Robledo as German Soldier in Desert with von Stegel
- Dominique Rozan as Parisian on the Champs-Elysées
- Fernando Sancho as German Corporal in the Oasis
- Enrique Ávila as German Soldier Playing Cards

== Bibliography ==
- Hammer, Tad Bentley (1991). International Film Prizes: An Encyclopedia. Garland. ISBN 978-0-8240-7099-1.
