= La Métamorphose des cloportes =

- Directed by: Pierre Granier-Deferre
- Screenplay by: Albert Simonin; Michel Audiard (dialogue)
- Based on: La Métamorphose des cloportes by Alphonse Boudard
- Produced by: Bertrand Javal
- Starring: Lino Ventura; Charles Aznavour; Pierre Brasseur; Irina Demick; Georges Géret; Françoise Rosay; Daniel Ceccaldi
- Cinematography: Nicolas Hayer
- Edited by: Jean Ravel
- Music by: Jimmy Smith
- Distributed by: 20th Century Fox (France); International Classics (USA)
- Release dates: September 8, 1965 (Italy); October 1, 1965 (France); April 18, 1966 (USA, New York)
- Running time: 98 minutes
- Countries: France; Italy
- Language: French
- Box office: 905,484 admissions (France)

La Métamorphose des cloportes is a 1965 French and Italian comedy crime film comedy directed by Pierre Granier-Deferre.

== Cast ==
- Lino Ventura : Alphonse Maréchal
- Charles Aznavour : Edmond Clancul
- Irina Demick : Catherine Verdier
- Maurice Biraud : Arthur
- Georges Géret : Rouquemoute
- Pierre Brasseur : Tonton
- Françoise Rosay : Gertrude
- Annie Fratellini : Léone
- Daniel Ceccaldi : Lescure
- Norman Bart : Un visiteur de la galerie
- Georges Blaness : Omar
- Dorothée Blank : Une fille à l'hôtel particulier
- Jean-Pierre Caussade (as J.P. Caussade)
- Marcel Charvey : Un visiteur de la galerie
- François Dalou: 2nd Inspector
- Michel Dacquin : Un barman de boîte de nuit (as Michel Daquin)

== Reception ==
According to Fox records, the film needed to earn $1,900,000 in rentals to break even and made $700,000, meaning it made a loss.
