= Les Tontons flingueurs =

1963 French-Italian-West German crime comedy film

- Directed by: Georges Lautner
- Written by: novel Albert Simonin dialogue Michel Audiard; Georges Lautner
- Produced by: Irénée Leriche; Alain Poiré; Robert Sussfeld
- Starring: Lino Ventura; Bernard Blier; Francis Blanche
- Cinematography: Maurice Fellous
- Edited by: Michelle David
- Music by: Michel Magne
- Production company: SNEG
- Distributed by: Gaumont Distribution
- Release dates: 4 October 1963 (West Germany); 27 November 1963 (France)
- Running time: 105 minutes
- Countries: France, West Germany, Italy
- Languages: English, German, French
- Box office: $24.9 million

Les Tontons flingueurs (French: [le tɔ̃tɔ̃ flɛ̃ɡœʁ]; English: Crooks in Clover, also known as Monsieur Gangster, literally Gun-toting Uncles) is a 1963 French-Italian-West German crime comedy film with French dialogue, directed by Georges Lautner. It is an adaptation of the Albert Simonin book Grisbi or not grisbi. The film is the final installment in the Max le Menteur trilogy; it was preceded by Touchez pas au grisbi and Le cave se rebiffe.

The film was not popular with critics upon its first release in 1963, but was popular with the public. Its reputation has grown over the years to cult status and it is now a French television classic, with snatches of dialogue and names of characters (like the prostitute Lulu la Nantaise) becoming part of popular culture. Its DVD version, released in 2002, sold 250,000 copies.

One of the most famous scenes is set in a kitchen where the gangsters try to make conversation while drinking a vile and strong liquor. Screenwriter Michel Audiard considered the scene useless but director Lautner included it in homage to the film noir Key Largo.

== Synopsis ==
Fernand is an ex-gangster with a plant hire business in Montauban. His modest, quiet life is disrupted when his childhood friend, Louis "the Mexican", who has become the boss of a gangster organisation in Paris, summons him to his deathbed. Louis appoints Fernand head of his business and guardian of his teenage daughter, Patricia, who only thinks about having fun and has never lasted in any school more than six months.

Protected by the loyal hitman Pascal, Fernand moves into the Mexican's suburban mansion, where he is welcomed by Maître Folace who is the organisation's lawyer, Jean the butler who is a former housebreaker and Patricia, who hopes to twist her new "uncle" around her finger. He learns that the business has four arms: a bowling alley, a brothel run by Madame Mado, a gambling den run by the brothers Raoul and Paul Volfoni and a distillery run by Théo. Both the Volfonis and Théo resent the newcomer and plan to get rid of him.

Théo's first plot is to get Fernand to deliver a load of contraband liquor, which he then ambushes. However, Fernand escapes alive and makes his way home. There he finds Patricia holding a wild party for all her friends, including her boyfriend Antoine who wants to marry her. The Volfonis, having failed to blow up Fernand's car, come round for a showdown but are disarmed and invited to a conference round the kitchen table, where all get horribly drunk on illegal whisky.

Next day, Théo and a henchman come round to finish the job but, as they besiege the mansion, an old gentleman walks up. He turns out to be Antoine's wealthy father, calling to arrange Patricia's marriage. While he talks to Fernand, bullets keep coming through windows.

The wedding is set, but before the ceremony Fernand has to get rid of Théo. Going to the distillery, a battle rages in which all Théo's men are killed but he escapes. Fernand then rushes to the church to give away Patricia. While everybody is inside, Théo drives up with a sub-machine gun, waiting to fell the wedding party as they emerge. On guard outside, Pascal blows up the car and its blazing wreck greets the newly-weds.

== Cast includes ==
- Lino Ventura: Fernand Naudin
- Jacques Dumesnil: Louis "the Mexican"
- Francis Blanche: Maître Folace, the lawyer
- Bernard Blier: Raoul Volfoni, the gambling manager
- Jean Lefebvre: Paul Volfoni, Raoul's brother
- Robert Dalban: Jean, the Mexican's butler
- Venantino Venantini: Pascal, the hitman
- Horst Frank: Théo, the distillery manager
- Charles Régnier: Tomate, distillery worker
- Mac Ronay: Bastien, gangster
- Henri Cogan: Freddy, gangster
- Sabine Sinjen: Patricia, the Mexican's daughter
- Claude Rich: Antoine Delafoy, Patricia's boyfriend
- Pierre Bertin: Adolphe Amédée Delafoy, Antoine's father
- Dominique Davray: Madame Mado, the brothel manager
- Philippe Castelli: the tailor
- Paul Meurisse: a passer-by (Théobald Dromard from Lautner's 1961 The Black Monocle)
