= Any Number Can Win (film) =

1963 film

- Original film poster
- Directed by: Henri Verneuil
- Screenplay by: Michel Audiard; Albert Simonin; Henri Verneuil
- Based on: The Big Grab by John Trinian
- Produced by: Jacques Bar
- Starring: Jean Gabin; Alain Delon; Claude Cerval
- Edited by: Françoise Bonnot
- Music by: Michel Magne
- Production companies: C. C. M. CIPRA; Cit Films
- Distributed by: Metro-Goldwyn-Mayer
- Release dates: 3 April 1963 (France); 8 October 1963 (United States)
- Running time: 118 minutes
- Country: France
- Language: French
- Box office: 3,518,083 admissions (France) $1 million (US)

Any Number Can Win (French: Mélodie en sous-sol, lit. 'Melody in the Basement') is a 1963 French crime drama film directed by Henri Verneuil. The film is based on the novel The Big Grab by Zekial Marko.

== Plot ==
Charles comes out of prison after serving five years for attempted robbery. His wife wants him to go legit but he immediately starts making plans for robbing the gambling casino at Cannes. Charles hires two assistants: Francis, a young man whom he met in prison, and Francis' brother-in-law, Louis. Francis is a petty thief discontented with his working-class background, while Louis is a humble mechanic, almost completely honest to a fault.

Charles orders Francis to go to the casino ahead of him, create a cover story as an affluent high-roller, and find a means to get access to the backstage, which will be crucial in the route to the elevator shaft that is the sole means to the basement vault in which the casino proceeds are kept. Francis does this by beginning a romance with dancer Brigitte. However, enjoying his affluent facade, he gets so caught up in the wooing of Brigitte he frequently ignores Charles' communications, which almost leads to the robbery being cancelled until Francis assures him he can stick to the intricate plan. Meanwhile, Louis tells Charles he will forgo his share of the money, fearing that he will be seduced by the luxuries it can buy him and that it will lead to more illegal behavior.

On the night of the robbery, Francis cavalierly breaks up with Brigitte, but watches her performance. After the show ends, he hides backstage, goes to the casino roof and lowers himself down first into the casino ventilation system, and ultimately the elevator shaft. He penetrates the counting room, subdues the head cashier and his assistants, then lets in Charles, who puts the money in a pair of bags. The two of them leave with a billion francs. Francis hides the money in a swimming pool locker room.

The next day Charles unexpectedly sends Louis on a train out of town, and demands to meet with Francis immediately. He shows Francis the front page of the newspaper – there is a photograph with Francis in it, taken the night before as he had been watching the stage show. Charles tells Francis he's too risky, and thus he will leave the resort quickly and send Francis his share later. He orders him to get the bags and return them to him in an outdoor swap near the pool. Francis retrieves the bags, but finds police are everywhere in the pool area, making it difficult to pass the money to Charles, who is waiting at a table. Francis then overhears the cashier telling detectives he remembers the look of the suitcases used to carry out the money.

Desperate, Francis places the bags in the pool. One bag breaks open, and Francis and Charles look on helplessly as the money inside floats to the top of the pool.

== Cast ==
- Jean Gabin : Mister Charles
- Alain Delon : Francis Verlot
- Claude Cerval : Commissioner
- Maurice Biraud : Louis Naudin
- Viviane Romance : Ginette
- Carla Marlier : Brigitte
- Dora Doll : Countess Doublianoff
- Henri Virlojeux : Mario
- José Luis de Vilallonga : Mister Grimp
- Rita Cadillac : Liliane
- Anne-Marie Coffinet : Marcelle
- Jean Carmet : Barman
- Jimmy Davis : Sam
- Dominique Davray : Léone

== Production ==
Screenwriter Michel Audiard came upon the novel The Big Grab by American author Zekial Marko (using the pseudonym John Trinian) through its French publisher Série noire, and suggested adapting the film to producer Jacques Bar. The French-Italian production received significant backing from MGM, who released it in the United States and other territories.

The main role of Charles was always intended for Jean Gabin, but the supporting role of Francis was initially planned for Jean-Louis Trintignant. Alain Delon heard about the project and lobbied Bar for the role, saying, "I want to make this film". Delon, gaining a reputation for films made in Italy with director Luchino Visconti, was eager to work in lighter projects with wider audience appeal, but the American producers of the film felt that Delon, unlike Gabin, was not well known outside France and Italy, and were opposed to his casting, saying, "If he wants to do the film, let him do it for free".

Delon offered a compromise, taking the film's distribution rights in certain countries instead of a straight salary. Because this had never been done before in France, this was known as "Delon's method". The gamble paid off well, with Jean Gabin later claiming that Delon earned ten times more money than him as a result. He reportedly made $125,000 from the Japanese rights alone. However, in 1965, Delon claimed "no one else has tried it since and made money".

== Reception ==
The Washington Post called the film "dazzling... one of the best of its kind in years." Bosley Crowther of The New York Times said it was one of the ten best films of the year.

The Mystery Writers of America gave the film an "Edgar" as the Best Foreign Movie of the year.

== Soundtrack ==
The instrumental jazz score was composed by Michel Magne. An arrangement of the main title theme was recorded by American musician Jimmy Smith, and released as a single on Verve Records, which was owned by MGM at the time; it peaked at 96 on both the Billboard Hot 100 and on the Hot R&B Sides chart. Smith later released the album Any Number Can Win on Verve, which featured his recording of the movie theme with other covers and some original compositions.

== Alternate version ==
A colorized version of the film was created in 1994, and aired on French television in 1996. This version ran 14 minutes shorter, with many scenes truncated but almost none completely removed. Only the black-and-white version received a U.S. DVD release, while most DVD releases in other countries have offered both the complete black-and-white version and the shorter colorized version.
