= Bernard Musson =

- Born: 22 February 1925; France
- Died: 29 October 2010 (aged 85); Paris, France
- Occupation: Actor
- Years active: 1954–1997

Bernard Musson (1925–2010) was a French actor.

== Selected filmography ==
- The Real Culprit (1951)
- It Happened in Paris (1952)
- Midnight Witness (1953)
- The Slave (1953)
- On Trial (1954)
- Flesh and the Woman (1954)
- Women Without Hope (1954)
- Blackmail (1955)
- Bonjour sourire (1956)
- Les Truands (1956)
- Suspicion (1956)
- Pity for the Vamps (1956)
- The Seventh Commandment (1957)
- Les Misérables (1958)
- Seventh Heaven (1958)
- La Vache et le Prisonnier (1959)
- Murder at 45 R.P.M. (1960)
- All the Gold in the World (1961)
- Le Miracle des loups (1961)
- Les Lions sont lâchés (1961)
- Charade 1963
- The Bread Peddler (1963)
- Diary of a Chambermaid (1964)
- Une souris chez les hommes (1964)
- Les amitiés particulières (1964)
- Belle de Jour (1966)
- Paris in August (1966)
- Action Man (1967)
- Le clan des siciliens (1969)
- La Vampire Nue (1970)
- Children of Mata Hari (1970)
- Peau d'Âne (1970)
- Macédoine (1971)
- The Discreet Charm of the Bourgeoisie (1972)
- The Day of the Jackal (1973) as Usher at the Elysée Palace (uncredited)
- Le Magnifique (1973)
- La dernière bourrée à Paris (1973)
- The Phantom of Liberty (1974)
- Comme un pot de fraises (1974)
- The Porter from Maxim's (1976)
- That Obscure Object of Desire (1977)
- One Two Two (1978)
- Lucie Aubrac (1997)
