= The Great Spy Chase =

- Directed by: Georges Lautner
- Written by: Michel Audiard; Albert Simonin
- Produced by: Alain Poiré
- Starring: Lino Ventura; Mireille Darc; Bernard Blier; Francis Blanche
- Cinematography: Maurice Fellous
- Edited by: Michelle David
- Music by: Michel Magne
- Distributed by: Gaumont Distribution
- Release dates: 1964 (France); 1966 (USA)
- Running time: 118 mins
- Country: France
- Language: French

Les Barbouzes (Barbouze being French slang for a spy, deriving from the idea that spies hide behind false beards) is a 1964 French cult comedy film, screened in the United States as The Great Spy Chase. Starring Lino Ventura, Bernard Blier and Mireille Darc, with dialogue by Michel Audiard, it is an espionage caper built around the efforts of agents from various countries to extract valuable weaponry patents from the young and attractive widow of an international arms dealer.

== Plot ==
In Paris, French counter-espionage are alerted to the death in an expensive brothel of international arms dealer Shah. To avoid repercussions and to exploit this opportunity, they smuggle his corpse back to his castle in Bavaria in the care of top agent Francis, posing as the dead man's cousin Ludo. There he hands it over to the young and very attractive French widow Amaranth, who is now the legal owner of the valuable patents for nuclear weaponry that Bernard Shah had acquired. The fake cousin Ludo's mission is to get the patents for France, but he is joined at the castle by a fake Russian stepbrother Boris, a fake German psychoanalyst Hans and a fake Swiss priest Eusebio.

After trying unsuccessfully to eliminate each other by such devices as a bomb in the bathroom cistern and a scorpion in the bed, the four agents agree an uneasy truce and instead concentrate on charming the widow. While she is in no hurry to decide the future of her person or her patents, the shaky alliance of the spies faces two new challenges. One is O'Brien, a brash American who regularly bursts in and is regularly thrown out into the moat by the temporary allies. The other is gradual and subtle, in the form of Chinese spies who infiltrate the castle by killing the servants one by one and assuming their clothes and jobs.

Following a climactic battle in which the hordes of Chinese using martial arts are eliminated, Francis is admitted to the widow's bed and in the morning escapes with her to Lisbon, where the patents are in a bank vault. She, regarding the trip as an advance honeymoon with her next husband, agrees to return to France with him and the patents. But the three foiled spies and O'Brien have not given up, leading to further battles which demolish part of the Portuguese hotel and result in bodies dropping regularly from the night express to Paris. In the end, as a patriotic act to secure the patents for France, Francis commits bigamy by marrying Amaranth.

== Principal cast ==
- Lino Ventura: Francis Lagneau, a French spy nicknamed "Cousin Ludo"
- Bernard Blier: Eusebio Cafarelli, a Swiss spy nicknamed "The Canon"
- Mireille Darc: Antoinette Dubois, a French widow calling herself "Amaranthe"
- Charles Millot: Hans Müller, a German spy nicknamed "The Good Doctor"
- Francis Blanche: Boris Vassilieff, a Russian spy nicknamed "Trinitrotoluene"
- André Weber: Rossini, Shah's aide nicknamed "Faithful Rudolph"
- Jess Hahn: "Commodore" O'Brien, an American
- Noël Roquevert: Colonel Lanoix, Francis' control
