= The Gentleman from Epsom =

- Directed by: Gilles Grangier
- Written by: Michel Audiard; Gilles Grangier; Albert Simonin
- Produced by: Jacques Bar
- Starring: Jean Gabin; Madeleine Robinson; Frank Villard
- Cinematography: Louis Page
- Edited by: Jacques Desagneaux
- Music by: Michel Legrand; Francis Lemarque
- Production companies: Cité Films; Cipra Films; Compagnia Cinématografica Mondiale
- Distributed by: UFA-Comacico
- Release date: 3 October 1962
- Running time: 87 minutes
- Countries: France; Italy
- Language: French

The Gentleman from Epsom (French: Le Gentleman d'Epsom) is a 1962 French–Italian comedy film directed by Gilles Grangier and starring Jean Gabin, Madeleine Robinson and Frank Villard. The film was shot at the Saint-Maurice Studios in Paris. Racetracks scenes were shot at the Hippodrome d'Enghien-Soisy and Longchamp Racecourse on the outskirts of the city. The film's sets were designed by the art director Jacques Colombier.

== Plot ==
Richard Briand-Charmery is an older gentleman who frequents the racetracks of Paris, selling tips to customers while always looking to make himself a profit out of the dealings. Circumstances generally conspire to prevent his fortune, and he is forced to rely on assistance of his family, partly by threatening to embarrass them by being sent to jail for failure to settle his losses. One day he encounters Maud, an old flame who he once come close to marrying before having to abandon her following a heavy loss at the Epsom Derby. Now married to a banker and living in New York, they relive the good old days, and he treats her to an extravagant dinner in a high-class restaurant that he cannot pay for. He plans to dig himself out of his problems with a big scam, but soon finds himself even deeper in debt. Brief salvation comes when he is accidentally given the wrong ticket when laying a bet on horserace and wins a small fortune.

== Cast ==
- Jean Gabin as Richard Briand-Charmery, called "le Commandant"
- Louis de Funès as Gaspard Ripeux, the restaurateur of the Auvergne
- Jean Lefebvre as Charly le "tubeur"
- Paul Frankeur as Arthur, the boss of the circle of games
- Franck Villard as Lucien, the boss of the nightclub
- Madeleine Robinson as Maud, an old flame
- Joëlle Bernard as Ginette, wife of Lucien
- Josée Steiner as Béatrice, wife of Richard
- Marie-Hélène Dasté as the aunt Berthe
- Aline Bertrand as the patroness of the bar
- Camille Fournier as Thérèse, the sister of Richard
- Georgette Peyron as the player
- Jean Martinelli as Hubert, the husband of Theresa
- Paul Mercey as Oscar Robineau, the provincial
- Alexandre Rignault as Charlot
- Albert Dinan as Léon, the bonneteur
- Jacques Marin as Raoul, the butcher racegoer
- Léonce Corne as Mr. Freedman, a player
- Albert Michel as a player
- Marcel Bernier as a player
- Edouard Francomme as a player
- René Hell as a player
- Robert Blome as a player
- Léon Zitrone as commentator
- Raymond Oliver as in his own role on the television
- Paul Faivre as the recorder of tickets P.M.U

== Bibliography ==
- Harriss, Joseph. Jean Gabin: The Actor Who Was France. McFarland, 2018.
