= Pasha (film) =

- Directed by: Georges Lautner
- Screenplay by: Michel Audiard; Georges Lautner; Albert Simonin
- Based on: Pouce! 1967 novel by Jean Laborde
- Produced by: Alain Poiré
- Starring: Jean Gabin; Dany Carrel
- Cinematography: Maurice Fellous
- Edited by: Michelle David
- Music by: Serge Gainsbourg
- Distributed by: Gaumont Distribution
- Release date: 14 March 1968
- Running time: 82 minutes
- Country: France
- Language: French

Pasha (French: Le Pacha) is a 1968 French crime film directed by Georges Lautner that stars Jean Gabin and Dany Carrel and is based on the novel Pouce! by Jean Laborde. It tells the story of a senior Paris policeman pursuing a ruthless killer.

Filming began on 14 November 1967 and ended in December the same year, with release on 14 March 1968.

== Plot ==
Six months off retirement from the Paris police, Commissioner Joss is faced with a troubling case. His lifelong friend, Inspector Gouvion, was the only survivor when a valuable consignment of gems was lifted by a violent criminal known as Quinquin, who killed not only the rest of the escorts but the three men in his gang as well. Then Gouvion is shot dead in his apartment: it could be accident or suicide, but Joss is sure it must be murder. Despite huge efforts, he can't find Quinquin but he does find the body of one of his murdered colleagues. This was Léon, whose attractive sister Nathalie works in a night club.

She admits to having known Gouvion, in fact to be being kept by him, and it was to fund his passion for her that he co-operated with Quinquin. That ended with his death, and Joss is determined to avenge his foolish old friend. So is Nathalie, who has lost both brother and lover, but when she goes with a gun to Quinquin's hideout, he shoots her too. For Joss, the wraps are now off and he is going to get Quinquin dead rather than alive. Putting heavy pressure on his sources, he learns that Quinquin is going to rob a mail train and take the proceeds to a deserted sugar refinery. Waiting there, he personally finishes off Quinquin and in a gun battle his men kill the rest of the gang.

== Cast ==
- Jean Gabin as Comissaire Joss, le Pacha
- Dany Carrel as Nathalie Villar
- Jean Gaven as Marc
- André Pousse as Quinquin
- Louis Arbessier as Le directeur chez Boucheron
- Gérard Buhr as Arsène
- Robert Dalban as Inspecteur Gouvion
- Maurice Garrel as Brunet
- Pierre Koulak as Marcel le Coréen
- Pierre Leproux as Druber
- Frédéric de Pasquale as Alfred
- André Weber as Gino
- Serge Gainsbourg as himself

== Reception ==
=== Censorship issues ===
The French Board of censorship was outraged by the violence of certain scenes in the film as well as by one particular Gainsbourg’s song in the soundtrack, with its vulgar and cynical lyrics (literally ’Requiem for a cunt’), which led to the film being rated for Adults only at its release in 1968. Lautner had to hurry and edit some scenes so that the film might be distributed with a rating allowing spectators over 13 years of age.

=== Critical response ===
Le Monde found that the film showed too much self-indulgence and vulgarity but that its ’American’ cinematographic aspects and its novelty were worth praising.
