= Francis Ryck =

French writer (1920–2007)

Francis Ryck, born Yves Delville, March 4, 1920, in Paris – August 19, 2007, in Paris, was a French author of crime and spy novels. He also used the pen names Yves Dierick and Edo Ryck

== Works in English translation ==
- Loaded Gun (original title: Drôle de pistolet), (HarperCollins, 1971)
- Woman Hunt (original title: La Peau de Torpédo), (HarperCollins, 1972)
- Green Light, Red Catch (original title: Feu vert pour poissons rouges), (HarperCollins, 1972)
- Sacrificial Pawn (original title: L'Incroyant), (HarperCollins, 1973)
- Undesirable Company (original title: Le Compagnon indésirable), (HarperCollins, 1974)
- Account Rendered (original title: Le Prix des choses), (HarperCollins, 1975), also published as The Sern Charter (Coward, McCann & Geoghegan, 1976)
