= Jacqueline Thiédot =

French film editor

- Born: 17 June 1925; Lyon, France
- Died: 13 October 2017 (aged 92); Montmorency, Paris, France
- Occupation: Editor
- Years active: 1948-1995 (film)

Jacqueline Thiédot (1925–2017) was a French film editor. She worked for several decades in the French film industry. She was nominated for a César Award for Best Editing for her work on Nelly and Mr. Arnaud at the 1996 Awards.

== Selected filmography ==
- The Call of Destiny (1953)
- April Fools' Day (1954)
- Gas-Oil (1955)
- Short Head (1956)
- Fugitive in Saigon (1957)
- Retour de manivelle (1957)
- The Possessors (1958)
- Archimède le clochard (1959)
- The Counterfeiters of Paris (1961)
- Taxi for Tobruk (1961)
- Emile's Boat (1962)
- Black Sun (1966)
- I Killed Rasputin (1967)
- The Things of Life (1970)
- Max et les ferrailleurs (1971)
- Le Far West (1973)
- A Simple Story (1978)
- Little Girl in Blue Velvet (1978)
- Fire's Share (1978)
- Les Égouts du paradis (1979)
- Mon Curé Chez les Nudistes (1982)
- Waiter! (1983)
- The Ruffian (1983)
- A Few Days with Me (1988)
- A Heart in Winter (1992)
- Nelly and Mr. Arnaud (1995)

== Bibliography ==
- Hallet, Marion. Romy Schneider: A Star Across Europe. Bloomsbury Publishing, 2022.
