= Robert Dorfmann =

French film producer

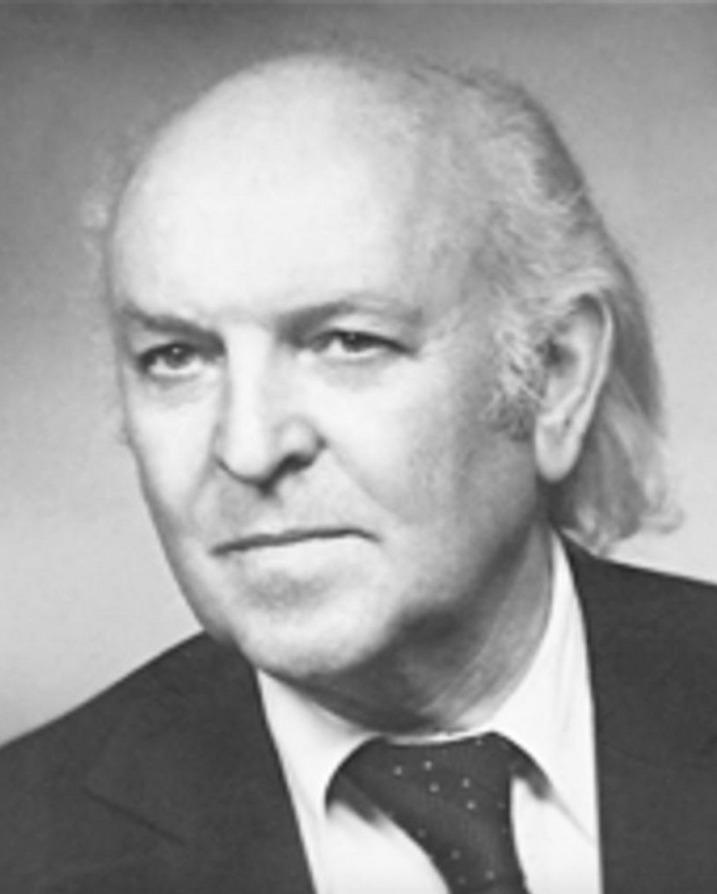
- Born: 3 March 1912; France
- Died: 11 August 1999 (aged 87); Paris, France
- Occupation: Film producer

Robert Dorfmann (3 March 1912 – 11 August 1999) was a French film producer who worked from the 1950s to the 1970s. He is the father of French film producer Jacques Dorfmann. His notable films include Luis Buñuel's Tristana (1970), Jean-Pierre Melville's Le cercle rouge (1970), Jacques Tati's Trafic (1971) and Papillon (1973). He was awarded an Honorary César in 1978. He was involved with the French production and distribution company Les Films Corona.

== Selected filmography ==
- Crossroads of Passion (1948)
- The Firemen's Ball (1948)
- Miquette (1950)
- Without Leaving an Address (1951)
- Never Two Without Three (1951)
- Skipper Next to God (1951)
- Matrimonial Agency (1952)
- Forbidden Games (1952)
- The House on the Dune (1952)
- The Air of Paris (1954)
- The Restless and the Damned (1959)
- Rendezvous (1961)
- Virginie (1962)
- The Bamboo Stroke (1963)
- The Great Silence (1968)
- A Taste of Death (1968)
- Papillon (1973)
