= Georges Lautner =

French film director and screenwriter (1926–2013)

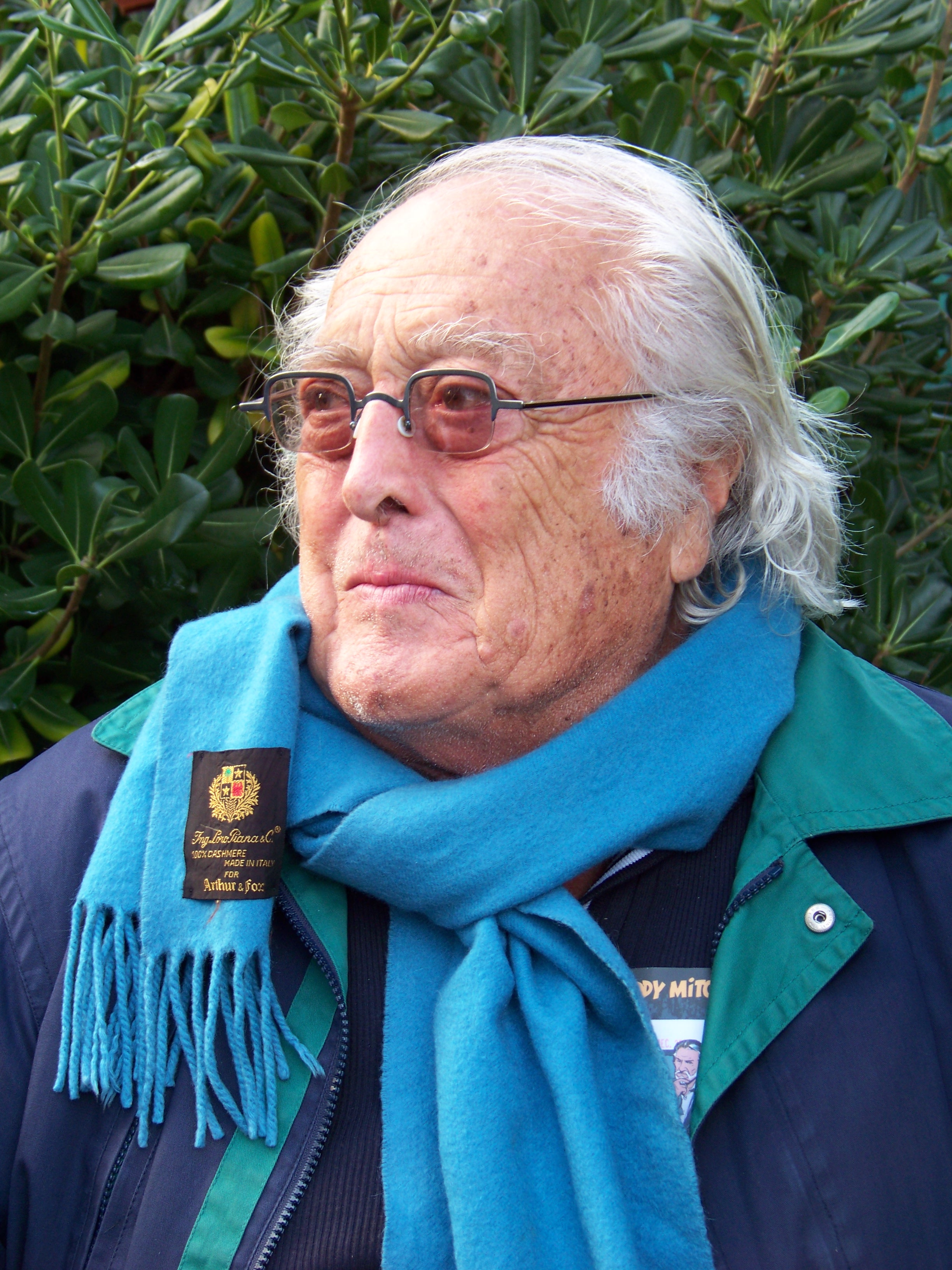
- Lautner in 2010
- Born: 24 January 1926; Nice, France
- Died: 22 November 2013 (aged 87); Neuilly-sur-Seine, France
- Occupations: Film director; screenwriter
- Known for: Les Tontons flingueurs

Georges Lautner (French: [lotnɛʁ]; 24 January 1926 – 22 November 2013) was a French film director and screenwriter, known primarily for his comedies created in collaboration with screenwriter Michel Audiard.

Lautner's ventures into other genres were less successful though the thriller The Professional starring Jean-Paul Belmondo was a big commercial hit in France in 1981.

== Biography ==
Lautner was born in Nice, France, the son of actress Renée Saint-Cyr and a Viennese aviator and jeweler. Renée Saint-Cyr later appeared in eleven of Lautner's films.

Lautner, at the age of seven, traveled to Paris when Saint-Cyr began her film career, and there he discovered cinema. Lautner eventually left school and landed jobs at French film studios.

Lautner became a film director after serving in an assistant director apprenticeship.

The 1990 thriller Presumed Dangerous and 1970s Road to Salina were Lautner's only English-language films, director Quentin Tarantino used a song from Road to Salina for Kill Bill: Volume 2.

== Filmography ==
=== As director ===
- 1958: La Môme aux boutons
- 1960: Arrêtez les tambours
- 1960: Marche ou crève
- 1961: Le Monocle noir
- 1962: The Seventh Juror
- 1962: Operation Gold Ingot
- 1962: L'Œil du Monocle
- 1963: Les Tontons flingueurs
- 1964: Salad by the Roots
- 1964: The Monocle Laughs
- 1964: The Great Spy Chase
- 1965: How to Keep the Red Lamp Burning, co-directed with Gilles Grangier
- 1966: Galia
- 1966: Let's Not Get Angry
- 1967: La Grande Sauterelle
- 1968: Fleur d'oseille
- 1968: Le Pacha
- 1970: Road to Salina
- 1971: Laisse aller... c'est une valse
- 1972: Il était une fois un flic
- 1973: La Valise
- 1973: Quelques messieurs trop tranquilles
- 1974: Icy Breasts
- 1975: Pas de problème !
- 1976: On aura tout vu
- 1977: Death of a Corrupt Man
- 1978: Ils sont fous ces sorciers
- 1979: Cop or Hood
- 1980: Le Guignolo
- 1981: Est-ce bien raisonnable ?
- 1981: The Professional
- 1983: My Other Husband (Attention! Une femme peut en cacher une autre)
- 1984: Le Cowboy
- 1984: Happy Easter
- 1985: La Cage aux Folles 3: The Wedding
- 1987: La Vie dissolue de Gérard Floque
- 1988: La Maison assassinée
- 1989: L'Invité surprise
- 1990: Presumed Dangerous
- 1991: Triplex
- 1992: Room Service
- 1992: Prêcheur en eau trouble (TV)
- 1992: Stranger in the House
- 1994: L'Homme de mes rêves (TV)
- 1996: Le Comédien (TV)
- 2000: Drug Scenes (segment Le bistrot)

=== As screenwriter ===
- 1960: Arrêtez les tambours
- 1960: Marche ou crève
- 1962: Operation Gold Ingot
- 1962: L'Œil du Monocle
- 1963: Les Tontons flingueurs
- 1964: Salad by the Roots
- 1964: The Monocle Laughs
- 1965: How to Keep the Red Lamp Burning, co-directed with Gilles Grangier
- 1966: Let's Not Get Angry
- 1967: La Grande Sauterelle
- 1968: Fleur d'oseille
- 1968: Le Pacha
- 1970: Strogoff, directed by Eriprando Visconti
- 1970: Road to Salina
- 1971: Laisse aller... c'est une valse
- 1972: Il était une fois un flic
- 1973: La Valise
- 1973: Quelques messieurs trop tranquilles
- 1975: Pas de problème !
- 1978: Ils sont fous ces sorciers
- 1981: The Professional
- 1984: Le Cowboy
- 1984: Happy Easter
- 1985: La Cage aux Folles 3: The Wedding
- 1987: La Vie dissolue de Gérard Floque
- 1988: La Maison assassinée
- 1989: L'Invité surprise
- 1990: Presumed Dangerous
- 1992: Prêcheur en eau trouble (TV)
- 1992: Stranger in the House
- 1994: L'Homme de mes rêves (TV)
- 1995: Entre ces mains-là, directed by Arnaud Sélignac (TV)
- 2003: La Trilogie des 'Monocle', directed by David Maltese (TV)

=== As actor ===
- The Pirates of the Bois de Boulogne (1954)

== Bibliography ==
On achève bien les cons!, is a thriller comic written by Georges Lautner and drawn by Phil Castaza, published by Soleil Productions in January the 28th 2004. This comics has been adapted for the screen by SystemD Productions.

== Honors and awards ==
- Knight of the Order of Legion of Honour
- Officer of the Ordre National du Mérite
- Commander of the Ordre des Arts et des Lettre (1996)
