= Le Solitaire =

The Loner
- Directed by: Jacques Deray
- Written by: Alphonse Boudard; Jacques Deray; Simon Michaël; Daniel Saint-Hamont
- Produced by: Alain Sarde
- Starring: Jean-Paul Belmondo; Jean-Pierre Malo; Michel Beaune; Pierre Vernier
- Narrated by: Jean-Paul Belmondo
- Cinematography: Jean-François Robin
- Edited by: Henri Lanoë
- Music by: Danny Schogger
- Production companies: Cérito Films; Sara Films
- Distributed by: AMLF
- Release date: 18 March 1987 (France)
- Running time: 100 minutes
- Country: France
- Language: French
- Box office: $6.9 million

The Loner (French: Le Solitaire) is a 1987 French crime film directed and co-written by Jacques Deray, starring Jean-Paul Belmondo, Jean-Pierre Malo, Michel Beaune and Pierre Vernier. It was the last in a series of commercial action films made by Belmondo, which started with 1975's The Night Caller and made him a powerhouse at the continental European box office.

== Plot ==
The policeman Stan Jalard and his colleague Simon Lecache are rather fed up with police work. They are toying with the idea to quit police service in order to run a hotel on the Antilles. Single father Lecache has already asked his son Christian about it. But at the very evening when Lecache tells Jalard that his son approves of their plan, Lecache is murdered by the professional killer Charly Schneider.

Jalard changes his mind. He dedicates his life all the more to police work. After two more years he has been promoted but he had no chance to get Schneider yet because Schneider disappeared. Eventually Schneider returns to France and commits crimes. Moreover, he threatens Jalard on the phone and later devastates his flat. He even sends somebody to shoot Jalard and his godson Christian in the street.

Jalard identifies Schneider's new accomplices and puts them under pressure. Step by step he closes in on him until he can confront him in his hide-out. Schneider refuses to show any regret, eludes and steals a car. He tries to run over Jalard who arrests him anyway. Now that Jalard has brought the murderer of Christian's father to justice, he allows Christian to call him "Dad". He, who has put his godson away into boarding schools all the time and lived only for his police work, now demonstrates a shift in priorities. When they drive home, Jalard puts a police siren on top of his car and drives wiggly lines just because that obviously amuses little Christian a lot.

== Cast ==
- Jean-Paul Belmondo: Commissaire Stan Jalard
- Jean-Pierre Malo: Charly Schneider
- Michel Beaune: Pezzoli
- Pierre Vernier: Maurin
- François Dunoyer: René Pignon
- Michel Creton: Simon Lecache
- Franck Ayas: Christian Lecache
- Bernard Farcy: Carmoni Lecache

== Production ==
=== Development and writing ===
During promotion for his previous film, 1985's Hold-Up, Belmondo announced that he had two projects lined-up: his long awaited return to the stage and another crime film, which became The Loner. Veteran helmer Jacques Deray was already attached at the time, and was the actor's choice. It was a natural one, as he had directed Belmondo in three prior films, including 1983's The Outsider (Le Marginal), which had been a massive hit, whereas his next three, The Vultures, Happy Easter and Hold-Up, although quite successful, had not lived up to the star's lofty standards.

At the time of release, Deray insisted on the differences between this film and The Outsider, saying that while it remained "Belmondian", the actor wanted a more story-driven affair, in the prestigious tradition of the film noirs directed by Jacques Becker and Julien Duvivier. The action scenes were noted for being far more subdued than in the actor's prior body of work. This was acknowledged by Deray, who declared: "The Loner is of course a film about movement and action, but Jean-Paul does not perform any stunt. [He] wanted to take a break. The Loner is a film where there is no outstanding physical feat. [...] He is more of a psychological hero than a physical one."

In his memoirs however, Deray was more upfront regarding the film's limited ambitions, calling it "a copy of The Outsider". Another, more pragmatic reason for its low action quotient was a serious spinal injury suffered by Belmondo while attempting an air lift stunt for Belmondo de A à Z ('Belmondo from A to Z'), a variety television special hosted by Patrick Sabatier to promote Hold-up, which had left him with persistent discomfort.

Despite the contributions of former police officer Simon Michaël and Alphonse Boudard, an acclaimed novelist known for both intimate and hardboiled crime stories, the writing process was not a smooth one. Deray opined that "the story is simplistic and the dialogues are flat". Belmondo was also dissatisfied with the final script, which he felt was the primary reason for the film's failure, saying: "There were writing issues that [it] was never able to leave behind." The original title was Cobra but, following the release of the eponymous Sylvester Stallone starrer, it was changed to The Loner, whose similarity with The Outsider further highlighted its formulaic nature. Other considered titles were Règlements de compte ('Paybacks'), Superflic ('Supercop') and L'Ombre d'un flic ('Shadow of a Cop'), the latter being Deray and Belmondo's favorite.

=== Casting ===
As usual, several of Belmondo's close friends feature in the cast, such as Michel Beaune and Pierre Vernier, two of his classmates at the Conservatoire national supérieur d'art dramatique. Belmondo's then girlfriend, Brazilian model and singer Maria Carlos Sottomayor, also shows up in a musical number, in the final of her three on-screen appearances with the star. They broke up in 1987, although they remained on good terms. Shortly before this film, stage actor Jean-Pierre Malo had portrayed a ruthless hitman in Spécial Police, another hardboiled cop movie written by Simon Michaël.

=== Filming ===
The picture was shot in September and October 1986, at the fr:Studios de Boulogne (today fr:Canal Factory) in Boulogne-Billancourt—the last of six films shot there by the actor— and on location throughout the Paris region. The two major confrontations between Jalard and Schneider were filmed in Montparnasse, in the 14th arrondissement of Paris. Lecache's murder and the ensuing chase take place at the Vandamme Nord entertainment complex, inside the New York New York night club, through the Gaîté-Montparnasse Ice Rink (neither of which exist anymore), and into the adjacent rue Vercingétorix and rue Jean Zay. The hotel depicted in the final showdown is located on Avenue du Maine and remains in operation as part of the Campanile chain.

The Loner's shoot was memorialized in the short film Les Pros, directed by Florence Moncorgé, the daughter of Belmondo's erstwhile co-star Jean Gabin. The documentary draws a parallel between Belmondo's filming preparation and the pre-race rituals of its other subject, star jockey Yves Saint-Martin.

== Release ==
=== Promotion ===
At the time of the film's release, Belmondo was also starring in Kean, Jean-Paul Sartre's version of an Alexandre Dumas play, at the Théâtre Marigny, enjoying critical acclaim for his first stage work in thirty years. As a result, the majority of his promotional air time was dedicated to the play, rather than to the more conventional The Loner, which Deray partially blamed for the film's tepid commercial performance. For example, the March 1987 issue of magazine Studio, which coincided with the film's release, included a review of Kean but did not mention The Loner once despite being a film publication. Additionally, the French film industry was experiencing a multi-year attendance slump at the time, which particularly affected domestic films.

The Loner's poster retained the same style and font, devised by Belmondo's former manager fr:René Chateau, that have come to characterize the period of his career. It was preceded by a teaser poster that only showed Belmondo's eyes, his name and the release date against a black background, while omitting the title entirely.

=== Domestic ===
Released in France on 18 March 1987, The Loner opened in first place with 401,000 admissions in its first week, a decent if unspectacular performance. However, it quickly faded at the box office and finished its run with only 918,197 admissions, a steep decline from the already diminishing returns of Belmondo's last few films. It was the first time since 1964 that one of his vehicles had failed to draw at least one million patrons in his home country.

=== International ===
In Germany, once a dependable market, the film was released by Metropol-Filmverleih, a smaller than usual distributor for the actor. It generated 329,000 admissions and finished in 54th place at the 1987 box office, well below The Outsider, which had ranked 16th for 1983. However in the Soviet Union, where Belmondo's name still carried great mystique at this stage of his career, the film drew in a sizeable audience, with 27.8 million tickets sold.

== Reception ==
=== Domestic ===
The film was poorly received by critics. Bernard Gérin of highbrow cultural magazine Télérama summed up the critical consensus, assessing: "If you have seen The Outsider, The Professional or The Night Caller, don't bother, you have already seen The Loner. The film was belatedly reviewed in the May 1987 issue of Studio magazine, where Christophe d'Yvoire wrote that "[Belmondo] seems to keep bringing up the miracle recipe that made him the number one star of French cinema. But everybody was already close to indigestion." He added that "[n]either the script (the same old story of a vengeful, tough yet kind hearted cop who fights against all odds), nor the tone, the characters, the acting, or the direction present any kind of interest." Jacques Siclier of Le Monde was also critical, writing: "[...] take and bundle together all the situations, all the characters that have been lying around for the last twenty years in French cop films, and you will get an idea of what is awaiting you: clichés, clichés and more clichés." He did have a few good words for the director, adding that "Deray can't help but show his craft in the action scenes, on the technical side". Of the star's performance, he said: "Belmondo does everything he thinks is expected of him at the cinema. He does not look tired, but maybe we are longing for something different anyway."

=== International ===
International reception was along the same lines. Robert-Claude Bérubé of Canadian media watchdog fr:Mediafilm called the film "a succession of tropes, staged with a certain efficiency but not much enthusiasm by an experienced director." He did commend "a few touches of tenderness and humor brought forth by the presence of the cop's protégé, a cheeky orphan." El País' Antonio Albert found Belmondo's character "as cold a guy as he is uninteresting, except with the token little orphan." Writing for state-sponsored Soviet film magazine Iskusstvo Kino, Sergey Lavrentiev opined that "[t]he plotline here is extremely simple, typical and familiar [...] Moreover, the general lethargy is not compensated for by the genre's seemingly obligatory brawls and shootings: in The Loner, they take up unforgivably little screen time. It seems that Jacques Deray, as an experiment, decided to build a police thriller on dialogue alone, hoping that the commercial success of the film would be ensured by the mere fact that the main role was played by the irresistible Belmondo". AllMovie's Dan Pavlides rated the film a two on a scale of one to five.

== Post-release ==
=== Television ===
While audience fatigue hindered The Loner's theatrical run, Belmondo's star power was enduring enough to ensure a considerable home viewership. The rights to the film's over-the-air debut were acquired by TF1, by far the dominant force in French television, and delivered the expected audience, drawing an average of 12.1 million viewers for a massive 48 percent share on 9 October 1990.

=== Home media ===
The Loner has been issued on DVD with English subtitles by StudioCanal, via Australian distributor Madman Entertainment. It received its release certificate on 6 October 2009.

== Legacy ==
Some contemporary articles immediately saw the film as a death knell for France's traditional genre production, with Studio magazine writing: "The Loner signifies both the end of an era and the bankruptcy of a system. [...] While unmemorable in itself, it will go down in history. Because it likely constitutes the pathetic final page of a whole chapter of French cinema. Pretty sad, actually." In his history of French cinema, academic fr:Jean-Pierre Jeancolas wrote that with The Loner, "the mechanic stopped working" for Belmondo and French crime films in general, noting the similar box office erosion of the star's long time rival, Alain Delon. He saw these films' loss of favor in a broader sociological context, writing that France's popular audience had stopped going out to the movies, and had only been partially replaced by a younger crowd that cared more about "images coming from elsewhere".

In a retrospective assessment for his book on neo-noir cinema, Italian critic Pier Maria Bocchi was more positive, praising Belmondo's attempt to steer his career away from "the image that had always constrained him, that of an athletic man of action, in a difficult role devoid of cascades [in French in the original]", whereas Delon, "to the contrary, doubled down on the masculinity of a genre without future". He called The Loner "one of the star's purest noir parts".

Le Solitaire : Bande originale du film

Soundtrack album by Danny Schogger Maria Carlos Sottomayor
- Released: 1987
- Genres: Pop; Synth-rock
- Length: 35:52
- Label: Polydor

Singles from Le Solitaire
- 1. "Life Time" Released: 1987

In 1987, Belmondo's biographer Philippe Durant described the film as his worse failure to date. Le Journal du Dimanche was slightly kinder, calling it "a (relative) failure". Belmondo, for his part, regretted making the film. In 2009, he told Gilles Durieux, another of his biographers: "It was one cop film too many. I was tired of them, and so was the public."

Belmondo experienced a brief resurgence when director Claude Lelouch, based on his performance in Kean, cast him in the dramedy Itinerary of a Spoiled Child the following year. It was a critical and commercial success, for which he won a César Award. However, the actor never again scored a sizeable hit, and his final attempt at an action film, 1998's Half a Chance, which paired him with Alain Delon, was another flop.

== Soundtrack ==
The film's soundtrack was released on LP and cassette by Polydor. In addition to a score by British composer Danny Schogger, it includes two songs performed by Maria Carlos Sottomayor: "Life Time", which Polydor also released as a 7-inch single, and "Ecstasy", which served as its B-side. A so-called Special Remix of "Life Time" by veteran sound engineer Thierry Rogen was also issued as a promo 7-inch by the same label.
