= Cop or Hood =

- Directed by: Georges Lautner
- Screenplay by: Jean Herman
- Based on: L'Inspecteur de la mer by Michel Grisolia
- Starring: Jean-Paul Belmondo; Marie Laforêt; Michel Galabru; Georges Géret; Jean-François Balmer
- Cinematography: Henri Decaë
- Edited by: Michelle David
- Music by: Philippe Sarde
- Release date: March 28, 1979 (France)
- Running time: 107 minutes
- Country: France
- Budget: 15 million francs

Cop or Hood (French: Flic ou voyou) is a 1979 French crime and action film directed by Georges Lautner. It's loosely based on the novel L'Inspecteur de la mer by Michel Grisolia.

== Plot ==
Stanislas Borowitz is a divisional commissioner from the IGPN (Inspection Générale de la Police Nationale) who uses particularly expeditious methods to counteract the "ripoux" (French term for "corrupt cops"). Sent to Nice to struggle against the Mafia and enquire on a murder of a notoriously corrupt commissioner, he changes his identity into a thug named Antonio Cerruti to trigger a gang war between the two biggest local sponsors, Théodore Musard ("l'Auvergnat") and Achille Volfoni ("le Corse"), and discovers a police organization with the mafia of the town. But the corrupt police inspectors Rey and Massard, on the pay of Volfoni, absolutely want to harm him.

== Cast ==
- Jean-Paul Belmondo as Antonio Cerutti and Stanislas Borovitz
- Georges Géret as Théodore Musard, ("l'Auvergnat")
- Michel Galabru as Commissaire Grimaud
- Marie Laforêt as Edmonde Puget-Rostand
- Jean-François Balmer as Inspecteur Massard
- Claude Brosset as Achille Volfoni
- Julie Jézéquel as Charlotte
- Michel Beaune as Marcel Langlois
- Catherine Lachens as Simone Langlois
- Tony Kendall as Rey
- Juliette Mills as Mrs. Bertrand
- Venantino Venantini as Mario
- Charles Gérard as Cazauban
- Philippe Castelli as driving school inspector
- Michel Peyrelon as Camille

== Development ==
Cop or Hood was a French production from two Parisian film companies: Bemondo's own Cerito Films and Gaumont International. It was based on the novel L'Insepcteur de la mer by Michel Grisolia. Grisolia was a film critic for Le Nouvel Observateur and this novel marked his debut as a novelist. The film had a budget of fifteen million francs and began filming on October 15, 1978, with a twelve-week shooting schedule.

== Release ==
Cop or Hood was released in France on March 28, 1979. The film was seen by almost four million people in France, with over one-million spectators in the Paris-area alone. It also performed well in the box office in Germany, Italy and Spain. It was released in the United States and United Kingdom as Cop or Hood.

It was released in Berkeley, California, on February 24, 1982, as part of a retrospective series titled "French Film Discoveries".

== Legacy ==
The box office success of the film led to four further collaborations between Belmondo and director Georges Lautner: Le Guignolo (1980), The Professional (1981), Joyeuses Pâques (1984) and L'Inconnu dans la maison (1992).
