= Patrick Alexander (writer) =

British writer

Patrick Alexander (1926 – 1997 or 2003) was a British novelist, thriller writer, journalist and screenwriter.

His novel Death of a Thin-Skinned Animal won the Crime Writers' Association "John Creasey Memorial Award" and was filmed in 1981 as Le Professionnel starring Jean-Paul Belmondo. Stephen Hunter admits that Alexander's novel inspired his own novel Dead Zero and questions where the inspiration ends and the theft of Alexander's idea begins.

Alexander was a chess fanatic; people in his novels often share his enthusiasm for the game. Death of a Thin-Skinned Animal features a "considerable description of a tournament" that chess player Stewart Reuben had organised.

== Bibliography ==
=== Novels ===
- Death of a Thin-Skinned Animal (1976)
- Show Me A Hero (1979)
- Soldier On The Other Side (1983)
- Ryfka (1988)

=== Screenplays ===
- Studio One (TV series) (1948)
- Der Verdammte (1957) (German TV movie)
- Passport to Shame (1958)
- De Veroordeelde (1959) (Dutch TV movie)
