= Pierre Vernier (actor) =

French actor (1931–2024)

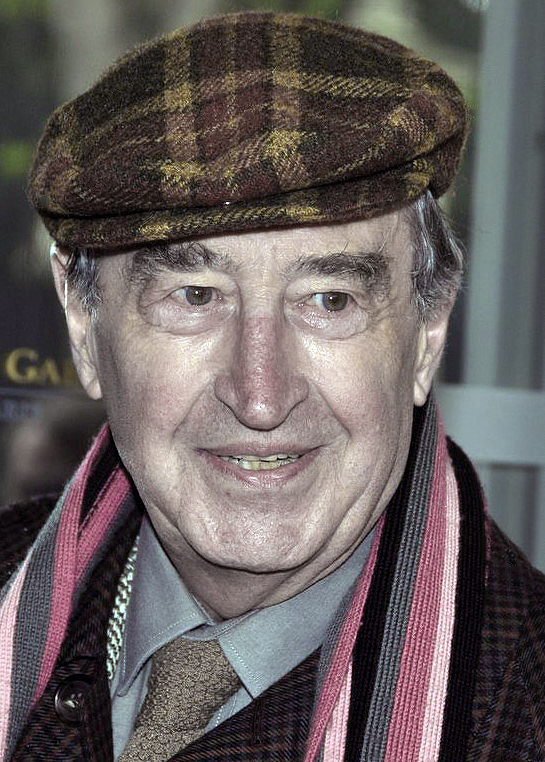
- Vernier in 2013
- Born: Pierre Louis Rayer; 25 May 1931; Saint-Jean-d'Angély, France
- Died: 9 October 2024 (aged 93)
- Occupation: Actor

Pierre Louis Rayer (French pronunciation: [pjɛʁ vɛʁnje]; 25 May 1931 – 9 October 2024), known by his stage name Pierre Vernier, was a French actor.

== Life and career ==
Pierre Louis Rayer was born on 25 May 1931. He repeatedly worked with Claude Chabrol, Henri Verneuil and Claude Lelouch, Georges Lautner and Jacques Deray.

In 2009, he portrayed Charles de Gaulle in a television film.

Vernier died on 9 October 2024, at the age of 93.

== Filmography ==
Year	Title	Role	Director	Notes
1951	Juliette, or Key of Dreams	a young man selling keepsakes	Marcel Carné	Uncredited
1958	Les Copains du dimanche		Henri Aisner	
1959	Les affreux		Marc Allégret	
1959	Rue des prairies	Un inspecteur	Denys de La Patellière	
1959	Eyes of Love		Denys de La Patellière	
1961	Wise Guys	Bernard 2	Claude Chabrol	
1962	Bluebeard	a magistrate	Claude Chabrol	
1962	Ophélia	Paul	Claude Chabrol	
1964	La Difficulté d'être infidèle	Jean	Bernard Toublanc-Michel	
1964	Weekend at Dunkirk	the undertaker	Henri Verneuil	
1965	La grosse caisse	L'agent de la sécurité	Alex Joffé	
1965	Un mari à un prix fixe	the beekeeper	Claude de Givray	
1965	Pas de caviar pour tante Olga	Hector Dumont-Fréville	Jean Becker	
1965	Un milliard dans un billard	Roger	Nicolas Gessner	
1966	The Gardener of Argenteuil	Noël	Jean-Paul Le Chanois	
1968	Darling Caroline	Bonaparte	Denys de La Patellière	
1971	Spaniards in Paris	Monsieur Lemonier	Roberto Bodegas	
1971	Rendezvous at Bray	Monsieur Hausmann	André Delvaux	
1973	Das Mädchen von Hongkong	Richmond	Jürgen Roland	
1973	Manalive	Innocence Smit	Frédéric Geilfus and Denise Geilfus	
1974	Piaf	Raymond Asso	Guy Casaril	
1974	Stavisky	Pierre Grammont	Alain Resnais	
1976	Monsieur Klein	Policeman	Joseph Losey	
1978	Le sucre	Latoussaint	Jacques Rouffio	
1979	The Dogs	Gauthier	Alain Jessua	
1979	Cause toujours... tu m'intéresses!	René Martin, l'homme à la cravate rouge	Édouard Molinaro	
1979	I as in Icarus	Charly Feruda	Henri Verneuil	
1980	Le Guignolo	Helmut von Nassau	Georges Lautner	
1980	Tendres Cousines	Julien's Father	David Hamilton	
1980	La Provinciale	the editor	Claude Goretta	
1981	On n'est pas des anges... elles non plus	Grégoire Dermoncourt	Michel Lang	
1981	Le Professionnel	Salvatore Volfoni	Georges Lautner	Uncredited
1982	Josepha	Jenner	Christopher Frank	
1982	Salut... j'arrive!	Michel, le mari de Carole	Gérard Poteau	
1982	Qu'est-ce qu'on attend pour être heureux!	Rudolph Valentino	Coline Serreau	
1983	L'ami de Vincent	Gérard	Pierre Granier-Deferre	
1983	Le Marginal	Inspector Rojinski	Jacques Deray	
1985	Le transfuge		Philippe Lefebvre	
1985	The Frog Prince	Monsieur Bourneuf	Brian Gilbert	
1986	Cours privé	Philippe	Pierre Granier-Deferre	
1987	Le Solitaire	Maurin	Jacques Deray	
1988	Door on the Left as You Leave the Elevator	André Arnaud	Édouard Molinaro	
1988	Itinéraire d'un enfant gâté	the chaplain	Claude Lelouch	
1989	Mama, There's a Man in Your Bed	Blache	Coline Serreau	
1992	Betty	Le médecin	Claude Chabrol	
1992	La Belle Histoire	the schoolmaster	Claude Lelouch	
1992	Stranger in the House	Le president du tribunal	Georges Lautner	
1995	Les Misérables	the prison director	Claude Lelouch	
1998	Le clone	Armand	Fabio Conversi	
1999	Joséphine, ange gardien	Jean-Louis Pirou	Henri Helman	Episode: "Une santé d'enfer"
2000	Sous le sable	Gérard	François Ozon	
2004	La confiance règne	Jacques Térion	Étienne Chatiliez	
2005	L'antidote	Le senior board member	Vincent de Brus	
2005	Palais royal!	The ambassador	Valérie Lemercier	
2006	Comedy of Power	Président Martino	Claude Chabrol	
2006	Le Grand Meaulnes	Le recteur	Jean-Daniel Verhaeghe	
2012	The Chef	Paul Matter	Daniel Cohen	
2012	La fleur de l'âge	Maurice Renouard	Nick Quinn	
2013	100% cachemire	Monsieur de la Chaise	Valérie Lemercier	
2017	Marie-Francine	Client Vaporette Oh!	Valérie Lemercier	
