= Le Petit Journal =

Le Petit Journal may refer to:

- Le Petit Journal (newspaper), a French daily newspaper, published 1863–1944
- Le Petit Journal (Montreal), a weekly tabloid based in Montreal, published 1926–1978
- Le Petit Journal (website), a French-language news website aimed at French speakers living outside France
- Le Petit Journal (TV programme), a French nightly current affairs and entertainment television show
- Le Petit Journal Saint-Michel and Le Petit Journal Montparnasse, a pair of Paris jazz clubs
