= Michel Beaune =

French actor

Michel Beaune (1933–1990) was a French actor.

== Filmography ==
- 1960: Trapped by Fear as Un ami de Paul (uncredited)
- 1961: Les godelureaux
- 1964: Backfire as Daniel
- 1970: The Confession as L'avocat
- 1970: The Time to Die as Castagnac
- 1970: Sortie de secours
- 1972: Paulina 1880 as Dadi
- 1972: Plot
- 1972: Les Rois maudits (TV Mini-Series) as Edward II of England
- 1973: The Inheritor as Frédéric Lambert
- 1974: Stavisky as Le journaliste maître-chanteur
- 1975: Un jour, la fête
- 1975: Let Joy Reign Supreme as Le capitaine La Griollais
- 1975: Incorrigible as Le ministre
- 1975: Le faux-cul as Ferjac
- 1975: The French Detective as L'inspecteur Dupuy
- 1976: Body of My Enemy as L'ami d'enfance
- 1977: La question as Professeur Fayard
- 1978: Get Out Your Handkerchiefs as Le médecin dans la rue
- 1979: Cop or Hood as Marcel Langlois
- 1979: Le mors aux dents as Froment
- 1979: Courage - Let's Run as Noël
- 1980: Le Guignolo as Louis Fréchet
- 1981: Julien Fontanes, magistrat (TV Series) as Bonsmoulins
- 1981: Birgit Haas Must Be Killed as Delaunay
- 1981: Dickie-roi (TV Mini-Series) as M. Hollmann
- 1981: The Professional as Le capitaine Valeras
- 1981: Coup de Torchon as Vanderbrouck - un nouveau riche arrogant
- 1983: Le Battant as Pierre Mignot
- 1983: Tout le monde peut se tromper as Le notaire
- 1983: L'indic as Le comissaire Legoff
- 1984: Mesrine as Le commissaire Devos
- 1984: Les Morfalous as Le général français (uncredited)
- 1984: Happy Easter as Rousseau
- 1984: Asphalt Warriors as Rigault
- 1985: Le cowboy as Le commissaire
- 1985: Honeymoon as Maître Garnier
- 1987: Le Solitaire as Le commissaire Pezzoli
- 1987: Itinerary of a Spoiled Child as Notaire de Sam
- 1990: Feu sur le candidat as Le ministre / Secretary of the Interior
