= Les Ateliers Gaîté =

Shopping complex in Paris

- Interactive map of Les Ateliers Gaîté
- Other names: îlot Vandamme Nord îlot Gaité
- Location: Paris, 14th arrondissement
- Address: Rue du Commandant-René-Mouchotte; Rue Vercingétorix; Avenue du Maine
- Status: In activity
- Constructed: 1972–76 (îlot Vandamme Nord); 2017–22 (Ateliers Gaîté)
- Use: Residential; Hospitality; Retail; Corporate administration Public services

Companies
- Architect: Pierre Dufau (original); Winy Maas (2017–20 remodel)
- Contractor: Eiffage (2017–22 remodel)
- Owner: Unibail-Rodamco-Westfield
- Manager: Accor (hotel)

Technical details
- Cost: FRF 120 million (îlot Vandamme Nord) €500 million (Les Ateliers Gaîté)
- Buildings: Pullman Paris Montparnasse Hotel; Galerie Gaîté; Gymnase Mouchotte; Les Balcons de Montparnasse; Tour Le Héron
- Leasable area: 85,000 m^{2} (910,000 sq ft) (îlot Vandamme Nord); 106,000 m^{2} (1,140,000 sq ft) (Les Ateliers Gaîté)

Les Ateliers Gaîté (lit. 'Gaîté Workshops') is a mixed use complex in the 14th arrondissement of Paris, France. Located in the broader Montparnasse area, the 1.5 acre ensemble takes its name from the Gaîté (lit. 'Cheerfulness') neighborhood its sits in, a reference to the many entertainment venues that once existed in the vicinity.

== Îlot Vandamme Nord ==
The original version of the complex was named îlot Vandamme Nord (lit. 'North Vandamme Block'), after a section of fr:rue Vandamme, which was replaced by the current rue du Commandant-René-Mouchotte during the area's redevelopment. It was sometimes just called îlot Gaîté. The majority of the buildings were built between 1972 and 1976, and designed by architect Pierre Dufau. The venture was led by real estate developer Joseph Vaturi of Société Overseas Development France (SODEFRA). The budget was projected at FRF 120 million in 1969. It has been the property of current owner Unibail-Rodamco (today Unibail-Rodamco-Westfield) since 1998.

The enterprise was set in motion to capitalize on a project to extend the A10 autoroute right into Montparnasse, although that was called off by Paris mayor Jacques Chirac in 1977 after protests from local residents. Between 1977 and 1993, two walkways connected Vandamme Nord to the other side of rue du Commandant-René-Mouchotte. In 1993, they were replaced by a single walkway connecting it to the TGV 2 hall at Gare Montparnasse. Despite its relatively low footprint, the ensemble boasted a sizeable array of amenities, in part thanks to its six underground floors.

=== Hotel ===
The complex's cornerstone is a luxury hotel tower, opened in 1974. It was originally called the Paris Sheraton Hotel, before successive rebrands as Montparnasse Park Hotel, Méridien Paris Montparnasse and Pullman Paris Montparnasse. It is ranked as the third largest hotel in Paris by number of rooms. Culminating at 116 mètres, it claims to offer the highest open air rooftop bar in Paris.

Jazz Café Montparnasse
- Interactive map of Jazz Café Montparnasse
- Former names: Le Petit Journal Montparnasse
- Address: 13 rue du Commandant-René-Mouchotte
- Owner: André Damon (founder & original owner, Le Petit Journal)
- Capacity: 300

Construction
- Opened: 1985
- Closed: 2016

=== Le Petit Journal Montparnasse/Jazz Café Montparnasse ===
Le Petit Journal Montparnasse was a jazz club and restaurant that operated within the complex between 1985 and 2016. Spun off from an earlier Quartier latin club called Le Petit Journal due to the newspaper clippings that adorned its walls, it was the largest of the two at roughly 500 m^{2} (5,400 sq ft), and became one of Paris' best known jazz venues. It was closely associated with Dreyfus Records, whose artists regularly played and sometimes recorded there. The label also released a venue-branded compilation album in 2002. Claude Bolling, Manu Dibango, Richard Galliano, Didier Lockwood and Michel Petrucciani are among those who have headlined there. In late 2017, a new tenant opened a spiritual successor on the same premises. As he could not secure the rights to the original moniker, it was named Jazz Café Montparnasse instead.

=== Other facilities ===
- Galerie Gaîté, originally Centre Gaîté, a 15,800 m^{2} (170,000 sq ft) shopping center occupying two floors. Extensively renovated three times before full remodel as Les Atelier Gaîté in 2020 (see below).
- Three stories of office space totalling 11,500 m^{2} (124,000 sq ft) above the shopping center
- A gymnasium, called Gymnase Mouchotte after the street it borders, equipped for indoor team sports and artificial rock climbing, with a rooftop synthetic track configured for different sports, including tennis, over the years. This part of the complex was delayed until 1984.
- Bibliothèque Vandamme, a public library located underground to the East of the complex.
- 2500 underground parking spots
- Le Héron, a 20-storey office tower, remodelled in 1990 under architect Maurice Novarina.
- A 16-storey residential building named Les Balcons de Montparnasse.

== 2017–22 remodel as Les Ateliers Gaîté ==
A strategy committee for the rehabilitation of Montparnasse was formed in 2005 as a joint venture between various local and regional governments, but few tangible initiatives came out of it. It was re-announced in 2015 with the "Montparnasse 2020" plan, which included an extensive rebuild of îlot Vandamme Nord and a reorganization of the nearby railway station. Concurrently, Dutch agency MVRDV received formal approval to oversee the former, under the direction of co-founder Winy Maas. The same firm had already worked on a refresh of Lyon's La Part-Dieu, another emblematic 1970s complex owned by Unibail-Rodamco-Westfield. The total cost of the Vandamme Nord makeover was evaluated at €500 million.

The hotel and mall were remodeled, with the latter taking over one floor of the underground car park, which was scaled down from 2500 to approximately 1500 spots. The mall now spans 28,800 m^{2} (310,000 sq ft) across three floors, and houses 65 retail outlets. A 4,000 m^{2} (43,000 sq ft) food court was also fitted out. With room for 25 food and beverage outlets, 800 patrons on the main floor and 300 more on a terrace, it was billed as the largest food court in Europe at the time of its 2022 delivery. The office floors located above the mall were rebuilt and expanded into a new 6-storey volume, offering a cumulative surface of circa 13,000 m^{2} (140,000 sq ft).

To secure the city of Paris' approval, URW agreed to contribute new and improved public service facilities to the complex. The library, previously located underground, was moved to a two-storey volume at and above street level, using space previously occupied by a bowling alley and spanning 600 m^{2} (6,500 sq ft). Additionally, it was renamed Bibliothèque Benoîte Groult in honor of the recently deceased author. A new 7-storey building was added to the ensemble, featuring a 630 m^{2} (6,800 sq ft) kindergarten and sixty-two social housing units totaling 4,530 m^{2} (48,800 sq ft), built using a wooden framework, ostensibly for improved environmental sustainability.

== Defunct venues ==
Gaîté-Montparnasse Ice Rink
- Patinoire de la Gaîté-Montparnasse
- Interactive map of Gaîté-Montparnasse Ice Rink
- Address: 16 rue Vercingétorix

Tenant
- Français Volants (1977–1980)

=== Ice Rink ===
Patinoire Gaité-Montparnasse (lit. 'Gaîté-Montparnasse Ice Rink') was a privately operated ice rink located below ground level. It was touted as the first new rink built in Paris proper since 1930, which omitted the smallish Sporting Victor-Hugo and the then outdoor (later covered) Patinoire Pailleron. From the 1977–78 to the 1979–80 season, it hosted the men's team of Paris' most storied ice hockey club, Français Volants. The rink was phased out during a 1986–89 remodel that followed the hotel's takeover by Méridien, and gave way to an extension of the latter, a new convention center.

=== Others ===
- A bowling alley and pool hall, which closed in 2010 due to rising rent prices.
- Adison Square Gardel, originally a traditional ballroom with two resident orchestras, its name was a pun on its owners, former big band leader fr:Fred Adison and chanteuse Gina Gardel. It soon turned to hosting disco nights to satisfy public demand. Could hold at least 200 patrons. Closed during the Méridien remodel.
- Krypton (later New York, New York). This 1,100 m^{2} (12,000 sq ft) club was furnished at a cost of FRF 10 million for a capacity of 900 patrons. It was one of the capital's main disco and funk hotbeds, drawing about 3000 patrons each weekend, and stars of the genre such as Sylvester appeared. According to a Paris guide published by Gault Millau, the Krypton was a known meeting spot for Middle Eastern men and local women looking for transactional encounters, which could usually be arranged for FRF 500 to 2500. More prestigious guests such as Liza Minnelli, Mick Jagger, Princess Stéphanie of Monaco and Jean-Paul Belmondo (who shot part of his film The Loner at Vandamme Nord) also spent evenings there. Closed during the Méridien remodel.
