= Crime on a Summer Morning =

1965 film

- Film poster
- Directed by: Jacques Deray
- Written by: Michel Audiard; Georges Bardawil; James Hadley Chase
- Produced by: Paul-Edmond Decharme; Benito Perojo
- Starring: Jean-Paul Belmondo; Sophie Daumier; Geraldine Chaplin; Gabriele Ferzetti; Georges Géret; Akim Tamiroff
- Cinematography: Juan Julio Baena; Jean Charvein
- Edited by: Monique Kirsanoff
- Music by: Michel Magne
- Distributed by: SN Prodis
- Release date: 16 July 1965
- Running time: 109 minutes
- Country: France
- Language: French
- Box office: 1.5 million admissions (France)

Crime on a Summer Morning (French: Par un beau matin d'été) is a 1965 French crime film directed by Jacques Deray and starring Jean-Paul Belmondo. The film is based on the 1963 novel One Bright Summer Morning written by James Hadley Chase.

== Plot ==
Francis and his sister Monique have a shady method for earning money. Monique lures men into her bedroom and shortly after her brother ends up storming in angrily claiming that she is underage. The men then have to pay them off to keep their reputation.

They receive an offer from the bandit Frank Kramer to join in on a kidnapping operation in Spain. Francis and Monique are promised a huge sum which means that they could retire from their petty con games. The target is the daughter of the American billionaire Van Willie.

They manage to kidnap her and confine her in with a retired painter along with his wife and son in Andalusia. But not everything goes according to plan.

== Cast ==
- Jean-Paul Belmondo as Francis
- Sophie Daumier as Monique
- Geraldine Chaplin as Zelda
- Gabriele Ferzetti as Vic Dermatt
- Georges Géret as Zegetti
- Akim Tamiroff as Frank Kramer
- Adolfo Celi as Van Willie
- Jacques Monod as Lucas
- Germaine Kerjean as Mme. Zegetti
- Analía Gadé as Consuela Dermatt
- Jacques Higelin as Le motard
- Claude Cerval as Le pigeon

== See also ==
- List of French films of 1965
