= Passport to Shame =

1958 British film by Alvin Rakoff

- American theatrical release poster
- Directed by: Alvin Rakoff
- Written by: Patrick Alexander
- Produced by: John Clein
- Starring: Diana Dors; Herbert Lom; Eddie Constantine
- Cinematography: Jack Asher
- Edited by: Lee Doig
- Music by: Ken Jones
- Production company: United Co Productions
- Distributed by: British Lion Films
- Release date: 1958
- Running time: 86 minutes
- Country: United Kingdom
- Language: English
- Budget: $180,000

Passport to Shame (also known as Room 43 and Room Forty Three), is a 1958 British drama film directed by Alvin Rakoff and starring Diana Dors and Herbert Lom. It was written by Patrick Alexander.

A young French woman becomes embroiled in a life of prostitution.

== Plot ==
Nick Biaggi runs a finance company that provides unsecured loans to naïve young women – a facade for manipulating them into prostitution. He recruits many of these women from abroad and to get them passports arranges "husbands" for them in marriages of convenience. His newest recruit is Marie Louise "Malou" Beaucaire and her sham husband will be Johnny McVey, a Canadian cab driver who owes money to Nick.

When Nick meets Malou he assumes she is already a prostitute and is amused when she tells him she is not. Malou believes that she has been hired as a companion to an upper class British woman, and Nick has established her in a nice house, where she meets Vicki.

Nick blackmails Malou into engaging in street sex work, and threatens to disfigure her if she doesn't comply. Johnny locates and rescues her. Subsequently, Nick and his gang recapture Malou and assault Johnny, while fellow cab driver Mike grows close to Vicki, who after her sister's suicide rebels against Nick and tells Johnny where Malou is held captive. Johnny rescues Malou once more. Cabdrivers converge on Nick's bordello and fight a pitched battle against Nick's gang while Vicki, Johnny and Malou escape. Nick falls to his death.

== Cast ==
- Odile Versois as Marie Louise 'Malou' Beaucaire
- Herbert Lom as Nick Biaggi
- Eddie Constantine as Johnny McVey
- Diana Dors ('guest star') as Vicki
- Brenda de Banzie as Aggie
- Robert Brown as Mike
- Elwyn Brook-Jones as Solicitor Heath
- Jackie Collins as English girl
- Lana Morris as girl
- Steve Plytas as French restaurant manager
- Cyril Shaps as Willie
- Denis Shaw as Mac
- Margaret Tyzack as June, Heath's secretary
- Joan Sims as Miriam, phone operator in the taxi office
- Pauline Stroud as Maria
- Michael Caine as man getting married (uncredited)
- Anne Reid as woman getting married (uncredited)
- Maurice Bush as client, dream sequence (uncredited)
- Emil Stemler as waiter (uncredited)

== Production ==
Filming began on 3 July 1958 and took six weeks. The camera operator was Nicolas Roeg. Ron Randell was originally announced to star.

This was Eddie Constantine's first English-language film.

== Reception ==
The Los Angeles Times said: "the picture is rather well done."

The Monthly Film Bulletin called it a "wildly incredible story" which "...must be the most wholeheartedly absurd prostitute drama yet. Motivations are mysterious and characterisations grotesque. Connoisseurs of the bizarre may relish some of the production's most ambitious moments."

Variety said: "Though a familiar entry in characters and general action, it has a plus in fairly unfettered looks at prostitution in London and the workings of a white slave ring. It looks to have exploitation facets for Yank dualer chances and its “X” certificate in England should also help at the boxoffice."

Leslie Halliwell said: "Would-be seamy melodrama which just about serves its purpose."

The Radio Times Guide to Films gave the film 3/5 stars, writing: "In the late 1950s, the BBFC reluctantly allowed producers to tackle prostitution as long as the films masqueraded as "Awful Warnings". This typical example has poor French waif Odile Versois coming to England and tricked into working for a brothel run by evil Herbert Lom. A cheap, tawdry and fascinating piece of vintage sexploitation. Way down the cast list, Michael Caine plays a bridegroom."

For Filmink, Stephen Vagg wrote: "Dors was the second female lead, once again better than the actual female lead".
