= Lettere di una novizia =

- Directed by: Alberto Lattuada
- Produced by: Carlo Ponti
- Starring: Jean Paul Belmondo
- Cinematography: Roberto Gerardi
- Edited by: Leo Catozzo
- Music by: Roberto Nicolosi
- Release date: 1960
- Country: Italy
- Language: Italian

Lettere di una novizia (internationally released as Letters by a Novice and Rita) is a 1960 Italian drama film directed by Alberto Lattuada. It is loosely based on the novel with the same title by Guido Piovene. The film was coproduced by France, where it was released with the title La novice.

== Cast ==
- Pascale Petit: Margherita Passi
- Jean Paul Belmondo: Giuliano Verdi
- Massimo Girotti: Don Paolo Conti
- Hella Petri: Elisa Passi
- Elsa Vazzoler: Zaira Michetti
- Lilla Brignone: madre superiora
- Emilio Cigoli: pubblico ministero
