= The Inheritor =

1973 French film

- Directed by: Philippe Labro
- Screenplay by: Philippe Labro; Jacques Lanzmann
- Produced by: Jacques-Eric Strauss
- Starring: Jean-Paul Belmondo; Carla Gravina; Jean Rochefort; Charles Denner
- Cinematography: Jean Penzer
- Edited by: Claude Barrois; Nicole Saunier
- Music by: Michel Colombier
- Distributed by: Valoria Films
- Release date: 1973
- Running time: 112 minutes
- Country: France
- Language: French
- Box office: 2,030,500 admissions (France)

The Inheritor (French: L'Héritier) is a 1973 French film starring Jean-Paul Belmondo.

== Plot ==
Hugo Cordell, media and industrial tycoon, dies when his plane explodes between Geneva and Paris. Examination of the plane's debris cannot establish the cause of the crash.

In Paris, the directors of 'Globe', the Cordell empire's flagship French weekly, anxiously await the arrival of Hugo Cordell's heir Bart (Jean-Paul Belmondo), who wishes to read the last issue before it goes to press. On the flight back from the United States Bart flirts with the seductive Lauren (Maureen Kerwin), who slips a baggage claim-check into his pocket.

At the airport Bart is welcomed by 'Globe' management and television reporters. The claim-check is found by a customs agent to correspond with a briefcase full of illegal drugs, and Bart is accused of drug trafficking. He understands perfectly that his arrival to head the Cordell empire does not meet with universal approval.

Aided by his faithful friend, David (Charles Denner), he decides to conduct his own investigation.

== Cast ==
- Jean-Paul Belmondo as Barthelemy Cordell
- Carla Gravina as Liza Rocquencourt
- Jean Rochefort as André Berthier
- Charles Denner as David Loweinstein
- Jean Desailly as Jean-Pierre Carnavan
- François Chaumette as Theron-Maillard
- Michel Beaune as Frédéric Lambert
- Pierre Grasset as Pierre Delmas
- Maurice Garrel as Detective Brayen
- Maureen Kerwin as Lauren
- Jean Martin as Monseigneur Schneider
- Marcel Cuvelier as The Minister
- Fosco Giachetti as Luigi Galazzi
- Anna Orso as Giovanella Cordell
- Paul Amiot as Hugo Cordell
- Michel Cassagne as André Dubois
- Serge Wagner as Campanella
- Philippe Labro as Journalist

== Production ==
The film was partially shot in the Fensch Valley of Moselle, including in Hayange and Metz, in October 1972.
