= Backfire (1964 film) =

1964 film

- Theatrical release poster
- Directed by: Jean Becker
- Screenplay by: Jean Becker; Maurice Fabre; Didier Goulard; Luis Marquina; Claude Sautet dialogue Daniel Boulanger
- Based on: the novel by Clet Coroner
- Produced by: Paul-Edmond Decharme
- Starring: Jean-Paul Belmondo; Jean Seberg; Enrico Maria Salerno
- Cinematography: Edmond Séchan
- Edited by: Monique Kirsanoff
- Music by: Grégorio García Ségura; Martial Solal
- Production companies: Capotole Movies; South Pacific Films
- Distributed by: C.C.F.C.
- Release date: 4 September 1964 (France)
- Running time: 97 mins
- Country: France
- Language: French
- Box office: 2,007,088 admissions (France)

Backfire (French: Échappement libre, Italian: Scappamento aperto, Spanish: A escape libre) is a 1964 French crime film directed by Jean Becker, which stars Jean-Paul Belmondo and Jean Seberg, reuniting for the first time since Breathless (1960).

== Plot ==
A criminal organisation offers a Parisian man, David, $10,000 to transport a car across Europe. They tell him little about it except that drugs are not involved. He is accompanied by a photographer, Olga.

David discovers he is smuggling gold. The two travel to Beirut then Damascus. They fall in love and David wants the gold for himself.

== Cast ==
- Jean-Paul Belmondo as David Ladislas
- Jean Seberg as Olga Celan
- Enrico Maria Salerno as Mario
- Gert Fröbe as Fehrman
- Renate Ewert as Comtesse
- Jean-Pierre Marielle as Van Houde
- Diana Lorys as Rosetta
- Fernando Rey as the Lebanese policeman
- Wolfgang Preiss as Grenner
- Michel Beaune as Daniel
- Roberto Camardiel as Stephanidès
- Fernando Sancho as Ylmaz
- Giacomo Furia as Nino

== Production ==
The film was made by the same team who had produced Banana Peel (1963).

It was to have starred Jean Louis Trintignant but he withdrew and was replaced by Belmondo.

Filming took place from February 10 to April 7, 1964. Costa-Gavras was an assistant director.

== Reception ==
The film was the 19th most popular movie at the French box office in 1964.

In 2020 Fimink wrote "The film’s existence is ideal useless trivia to annoy people with now that the Jean Seberg biopic has come out."
