= Les Copains du dimanche =

1958 film

Les copains du dimanche
- Directed by: Henri Aisner
- Written by: Henri Aisner; Lilo Dammert; Antoine Tudal; Gaston Bounoure; Raymond Lavigne
- Produced by: Pierre Levy-Corti; Louis Daquin
- Starring: Jean-Paul Belmondo
- Cinematography: André Dumaitre
- Edited by: Jean-Louis Levi-Alvarès
- Music by: Philippe-Gérard
- Distributed by: Sigmadis
- Release date: 1958
- Running time: 90 minutes
- Country: France
- Language: French

Les copains du dimanche ('Sunday's Friends') is a 1958 film which stars Jean Paul Belmondo. It was directed by Henri Aisner. The film promoted the trade union movement and was not seen in commercial cinemas.

== Plot ==
Trebois, a young laborer, is looking for something to occupy his Sundays, "a glorious activity to make the six working days fly by." He's tired of camping with his friends. One day, in the cafeteria, Casti's friend suggested that he join a flying club. After the flight, Trebois decides that he experienced the best moments of his life in the air. By chance, in the hangar, his friends saw an airplane that had been in an accident. Now restoring it and flying again becomes the meaning of his life.

== Cast ==
- Jean-Paul Belmondo as Trébois
- Marc Cassot as René Casti
- Yves Deniaud as Manaquin
- Marcel Perès as Bellac
- Paul Bisciglia as Lucien
- Paul Frankeur as Mr. Larcheron
- Michel Piccoli as the director of the aeroclub
- Robert Le Fort as Lemoine
- Julien Bertheau as Jean Raymond, known as "Raf"
- Évelyne Ker as Monique
- Sophie Sel as Mounette
- Germaine Michel as the mother Trébois
- Clément Thierry as the young bourgeois
- Georges Baconnet as the secretary of the committee
- Pierre Vernier as worker fitter
- Jacques Ferrière as Gilbert
- Bernard Fresson as worker in the canteen
- Annette Poivre as a lady at the inauguration
