= The Professional (1981 film) =

- Film poster
- Directed by: Georges Lautner
- Screenplay by: Michel Audiard; Georges Lautner; Jacques Audiard
- Based on: Death of a Thin-Skinned Animal; 1976 novel by Patrick Alexander
- Produced by: Alain Belmondo
- Starring: Jean-Paul Belmondo
- Cinematography: Henri Decaë
- Edited by: Michelle David
- Music by: Ennio Morricone
- Production company: Les Films Ariane
- Distributed by: Gaumont Distribution
- Release date: 21 October 1981
- Running time: 109 minutes
- Country: France
- Language: French
- Budget: $3.5 million
- Box office: $63.4 million

The Professional (original title: Le Professionnel [lə pʁɔfɛsjɔnɛl]) is a 1981 French action thriller film directed by Georges Lautner. The film stars Jean-Paul Belmondo as the title role. The film is based on the 1976 novel Death of a Thin-Skinned Animal by Patrick Alexander.

The film was a commercial success upon its theatrical release and was the fourth most watched feature film in France in 1981 behind La Chèvre, Raiders of the Lost Ark and The Fox and the Hound, selling 5,243,559 tickets.

== Plot ==
The Service de documentation extérieure et de contre-espionnage (SDCE, French secret service) agent, Josselin Beaumont, known as Joss, is sent to Malagawi (fictitious country, representing the former French colonies in Africa at the dawn of the 1980s), to kill the country's president for life, Colonel N'Jala, dictator and enemy of French interests. But, the political situation having changed, the French secret services no longer had any interest in having N'Jala killed and, rather than simply recalling Beaumont, denounce him to President N'Jala, on orders from the Élysée. At the end of a speedy trial where he is drugged to confess, Joss is sentenced to forced labor. After two years of slavery, abuse, suffering and multiple tortures, he escapes and returns to Paris with only one idea in mind, to take revenge on his superiors by accomplishing his initial mission: to kill N'Jala, taking advantage of a diplomatic trip by him to France.

Notified by himself of his project, Josselin Beaumont's former hierarchy begins to have sleepless nights. Colonel Martin and his team will do everything possible to stop Beaumont. He taunts his former colleagues while navigating between his old home, where he finds his wife, Jeanne, and that of his mistress, Alice Ancelin, a member of the secret services. The formidable Commissioner Rosen, of the Repression and Intervention Brigade, despite brutal and expeditious methods coupled with fierce hatred and contempt towards Beaumont, will fail in his hunt and be shot down by Beaumont, instead.

Making people believe in his death by attributing his identity to Rosen, he takes Inspector Farges hostage, who came to the morgue to identify the body, and thus manages to go back to N'Jala, sheltered at the Château de Ferrières. Thanks to some sleight of hand, Joss gives his empty revolver to N'Jala and lures him towards the window. The latter can't help but point it at Joss. Farges, believing that it is Beaumont who is holding the revolver, shoots the president dead. As Beaumont prepares to leave the scene in the helicopter bringing N'Jala's prostitute, the minister, urged by Colonel Martin, finally gives the order to stop him. Martin transmits this order to Farges, who kills Beaumont with a shot in the back.

== Cast ==
- Jean-Paul Belmondo as Josselin "Joss" Beaumont
- Robert Hossein as le commissaire Rosen
- Bernard-Pierre Donnadieu as l'inspecteur Farges
- Jean Desailly as le ministre
- Cyrielle Clair as Alice Ancelin
- Marie-Christine Descouard as Doris Frederiksen
- Elisabeth Margoni as Jeanne Beaumont
- Jean-Louis Richard as le colonel Martin
- Michel Beaune as le capitaine Valeras
- Pierre Saintons as le président N'Jala
- Pascal N'Zonzi as Arthur
- Gérard Darrieu as l'instructeur Picard
- Sidiki Bakaba as le prisonnier évadé
- Dany Kogan as sergent Gruber
- Marc Lamole as le serveur d'hôtel
- Radisa ''Steve'' Jovanovic as a policeman

== Production ==
=== Development ===
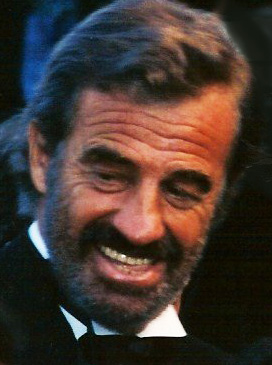
Jean-Paul Belmondo (here in 1988 at the Cannes Film Festival), the film's lead actor.

Jean-Paul Belmondo initially planned to work on Barracuda, directed by Yves Boisset, a film partly inspired by the Françoise Claustre hostage affair in Chad from 1974 to 1977. However, differences arose due to what Boisset described as "incompatible conditions regarding the project". Boisset wanted to include references to the Claustre affair, while Belmondo preferred it to be an adventure film. Alexandre Mnouchkine, Belmondo's producer, was not interested in Barracuda and suggested adapting Death of a Thin-Skinned Animal by British author Patrick Alexander, published in 1978 in the Série noire collection.

When Boisset declined, Belmondo, impressed by the book, decided to proceed with the film adaptation. Georges Lautner, available at the time, was chosen as the director, marking his third collaboration with Belmondo after Flic ou voyou (1978) and Le Guignolo (1979). Michel Audiard was tasked with adapting the novel and writing the screenplay. The story, originally set in England, was relocated to France to suit the production. However, the first draft, which retained some of the novel's dialogues, did not impress Lautner, Belmondo, or Mnouchkine. Audiard was reportedly more focused on writing Garde à vue, leading to the involvement of Francis Veber as a script doctor to refine the screenplay. Audiard's lack of interest led to his son, Jacques Audiard, being credited for the screenplay.

The film's title change was influenced by Belmondo and his publicist René Chateau, despite initial resistance from Mnouchkine, Lautner, and Audiard.

The story and political context of Le Professionnel were inspired by France's complex diplomatic relations with its former African colonies during the Françafrique era under Jacques Foccart.

=== Filming ===
With a budget of 20 million francs, Le Professionnel was filmed from 5 May to 13 July 1981. The African prison scenes were shot in the Camargue, with Montpellier university students hired as extras. Georges Lautner noted logistical challenges, including the need to shoot the opening scene with a telephoto lens due to issues with the set.

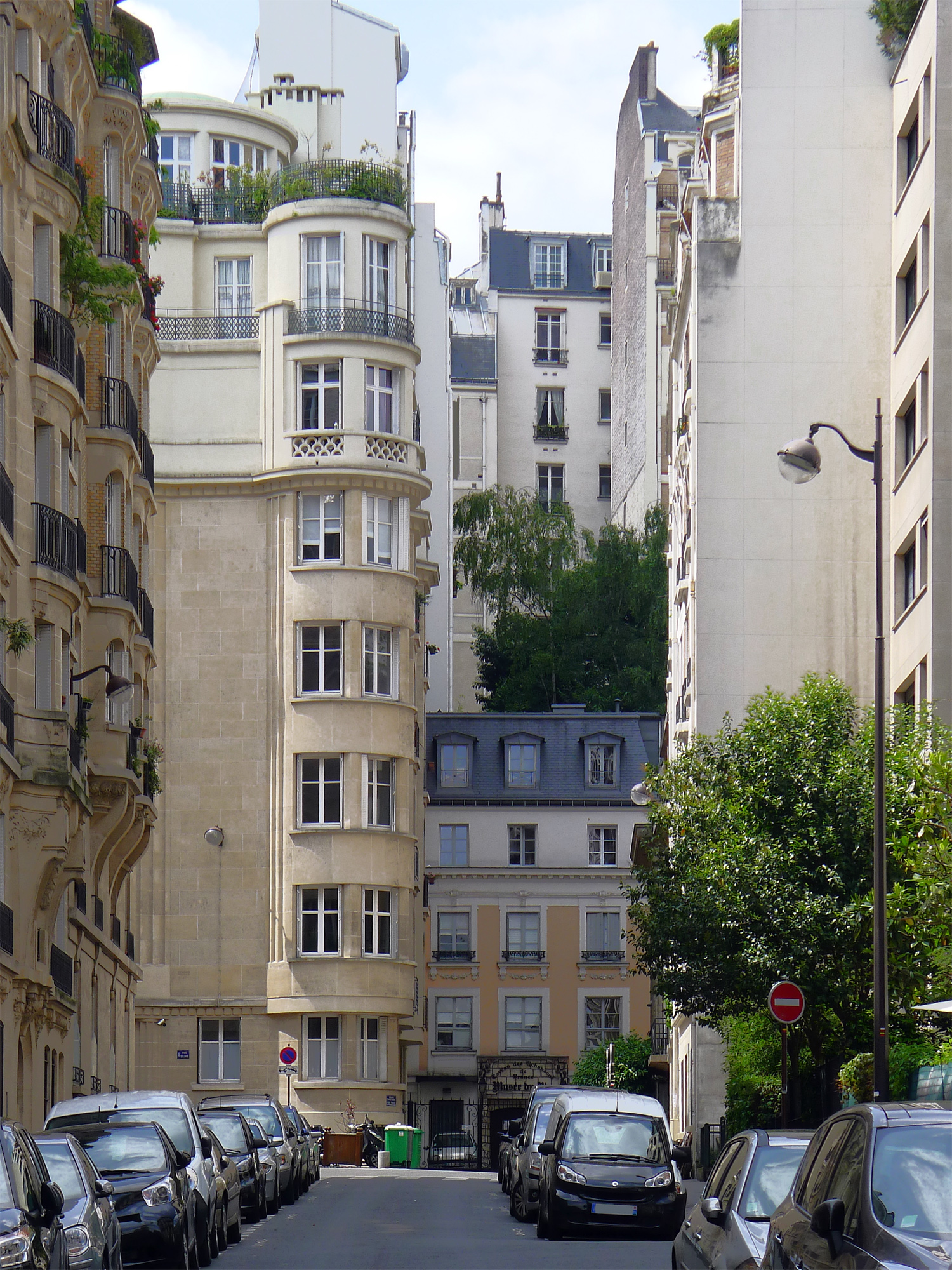
The beginning of Rue des Eaux.

Subsequent scenes were filmed in Paris, including the car chase between Beaumont and Rosen, choreographed by Rémy Julienne and shot near the Trocadéro. Paul Belmondo, Jean-Paul's father, helped secure filming permissions. Interior scenes were shot at the Studios d'Épinay.

The climactic scenes were filmed at the Château de Maintenon and the Résidence Salmson Le Point du Jour in Boulogne-Billancourt, accompanied by Ennio Morricone’s score. The final sequence, which deviated from the producers’ original vision, was retained due to Belmondo and Lautner's insistence.

=== Cast ===
The cast of Le Professionnel includes Robert Hossein as Commissioner Rosen and Cyrielle Clair. Belmondo suggested Hossein to ensure a formidable on-screen rivalry. Other cast members include Jean Desailly, Élisabeth Margoni, Bernard-Pierre Donnadieu, and Belmondo's longtime collaborators Michel Beaune and Pierre Vernier.

== Popularity in Eastern Europe ==
Because of the film's subject matter and the improving relations between France and the Communist Bloc at the time, the film had received a limited release in the Soviet Union and several other Soviet-aligned states like Poland, and received immense popularity, having become a household name there.

== See also ==
- Françafrique
- Three Days of the Condor
