= Jean Vautrin =

French writer, filmmaker and film critic

- Born: Jean Herman; 17 May 1933; Pagny-sur-Moselle, France
- Died: 16 June 2015 (aged 82); Gradignan, France
- Occupations: Writer, film director/critic
- Years active: 1958–2015

Jean Vautrin (French pronunciation: [ʒɑ̃ votʁɛ̃]; 17 May 1933 – 16 June 2015), real name Jean Herman, was a French writer, filmmaker and film critic.

== Life and career ==
After studying literature at Auxerre, he took first place in the Id'HEC competition. He studied French literature at the University of Bombay; he became assistant director to Roberto Rossellini. Back in France, he produced five feature films.

He became famous among the general public in 1989, winning the Prix Goncourt for his novel Un grand pas vers le bon Dieu.

His novel Le Cri du Peuple was adapted as a graphic novel by Jacques Tardi.

== Filmography ==
=== Assistant director ===
- India, Terre Mère
- Paris nous appartient
- Les Quatre Cavaliers de l'Apocalypse
- Le Jour le plus long

=== Director ===
- 1958 Voyage en Boscavie (co-directed by Claude Choublier) (short)
- 1960 Actua-Tilt (short)
- 1961 La Quille (short)
- 1962 Twist Parade (short)
- 1962 Le Chemin de la mauvaise route (short)
- 1963 Les Fusils (short)
- 1964 La Cinémathèque Française (short)
- 1967 Le Dimanche de la vie
- 1968 Adieu l'ami
- 1969 Jeff
- 1969 Decameron 69 (co-directed by Bernard Clarens, Jean Desvilles, Louis Grospierre, Miklós Jancsó, Serge Korber and François Reichenbach)
- 1971 Popsy Pop
- 1972 L'Œuf
- 1974 Graf Yoster, 2 episodes : Der Papageienkäfig and Das Spiel mit dem Tode (TV series)
- 1975 Les Grands Détectives, 2 episodes : Un rendez-vous dans les ténèbres and Monsieur Lecoq (TV series)
- 1975 Les Peupliers de la Prétentaine (TV series)

=== Screenwriter ===
- 1958 Voyage en Boscavie directed by Jean Herman and Claude Choublier (short)
- 1960 Actua-Tilt directed by Jean Herman (short)
- 1961 La Quille directed by Jean Herman (short)
- 1962 Twist Parade directed by Jean Herman (short)
- 1962 Le Chemin de la mauvaise route directed by Jean Herman (short)
- 1964 La Cinémathèque Française directed by Jean Herman (short)
- 1968 Adieu l'ami directed by Jean Herman
- 1971 Popsy Pop directed by Jean Herman
- 1972 L'Œuf directed by Jean Herman
- 1976 Le Grand Escogriffe directed by Claude Pinoteau
- 1977 Banlieue sud-est directed by Gilles Grangier (TV series)
- 1979 Histoires insolites (1 episode Le locataire d'en haut directed by Gilles Grangier) (TV series)
- 1979 Les Insulaires directed by Gilles Grangier (TV movie)
- 1979 Miss directed by Roger Pigaut (TV series)
- 1979 Flic ou Voyou directed by Georges Lautner
- 1980 Le Guignolo directed by Georges Lautner
- 1980 L'Entourloupe directed by Gérard Pirès
- 1980 Jean-Sans-Terre directed by Gilles Grangier (TV movie)
- 1981 Garde à vue directed by Claude Miller
- 1983 Le Marginal directed by Jacques Deray
- 1984 Rue barbare directed by Gilles Béhat
- 1984 Canicule directed by Yves Boisset
- 1985 Intrigues directed by Maurice Dugowson (TV series)
- 1985 Urgence directed by Gilles Béhat
- 1986 Bleu comme l'enfer directed by Yves Boisset
- 1987 Charlie Dingo directed by Gilles Béhat
- 1991 Berlin Lady directed by Pierre Boutron (TV series)
- 2000 Under Suspicion directed by Stephen Hopkins
- 2012 L'Été des Lip directed by Dominique Ladoge (TV)

=== Actor ===
- 1983 : Le Marginal, directed by Jacques Deray
- 1985 : Billy Ze Kick, directed by Gérard Mordillat
- 1986 : Série Noire, (episode La nuit du flingueur directed by Pierre Grimblat) (TV series)

== Novels ==
- À bulletins rouges, 1973
- Billy-Ze-Kick, 1974 - Novel adapted by Gérard Mordillat 1985
- Mister Love, 1977
- Typhon gazoline, 1977
- Le Mensonge - Chronique des années de crise, 1978
- Bloody-Mary, 1979
- Groom, 1981
- Canicule, 1982 - Novel adapted by Yves Boisset 1984
- La Vie Ripolin, 1987
- Un grand pas vers le bon Dieu, 1989 Prix Goncourt
- Symphonie Grabuge, 1994 Prix du roman populiste
- Le Roi des ordures, 1997
- Un monsieur bien mis, 1987
- Le Cri du peuple, 1998 Prix Louis-Guilloux in 1999. Adapted as a graphic novel in four books by Jacques Tardi in 2005.
- L’homme qui assassinait sa vie, 2001
- Le Journal de Louise B., 2002

=== Four French Soldiers ===
- Adieu la vie, adieu l’amour, 2004 [vol 1]
- La Femme au gant rouge, 2004 [vol 2]
- La grande zigouille, 2009 [vol 3]
- Les années Faribole, 2012 [vol 4]

=== Novellas ===
- 1983 : Patchwork, Prix des Deux Magots 1984
- 1986 : Baby-boom, Prix Goncourt de la Nouvelle 1986
- 1989 : Dix-huit tentatives pour devenir un saint
- 1992 : Courage chacun
- 2005 : Si on s’aimait ?
- 2009 : Maîtresse Kristal et autres bris de guerre

=== Collaboration ===
Les Aventures de Boro, reporter photographe, with Dan Franck

- La Dame de Berlin, 1987 - Novel adapted by Pierre Boutron 1991
- Le Temps des cerises, 1990
- Les Noces de Guernica, 1994
- Mademoiselle Chat, 1996
- Boro s’en va-t-en guerre, 2000
- Cher Boro, 2005
- La Fête à Boro, 2007
- La Dame de Jérusalem, 2009
