= Body of My Enemy =

Le Corps de mon ennemi
- Directed by: Henri Verneuil
- Written by: Henri Verneuil; Michel Audiard; Félicien Marceau
- Produced by: Jacques Juranville
- Starring: Jean-Paul Belmondo
- Cinematography: Jean Penzer
- Edited by: Pierre Gillette
- Music by: Francis Lai
- Distributed by: AMLF
- Release date: 13 October 1976 (France)
- Running time: 120 minutes
- Country: France
- Language: French
- Box office: $13.3 million

Le Corps de mon ennemi (also known as Body of My Enemy) is a 1976 French crime film directed by Henri Verneuil.

== Plot ==
After François Leclercq seduces the young and rich Gilberte Beaumont-Liégard, she introduces him to her family. Through the budding relationship with her in-laws, Leclercq is able to assimilate into the local upper class of his hometown, Cornai. A friend of Gilberte's father, Raphaël Di Massa hires him as manager of his new nightclub, "Number One". The oblivious parvenu Leclercq eventually discovers that "Number One" is actually a cover-up for Raphaël Di Massa's illegal drug trade. Following a dispute between Di Massa and Leclercq, the gun of the latter is stolen and used in the murder of a local football star. An orchestrated miscarriage of justice puts Leclercq in prison, despite his innocence. Seven years later, he returns to Cornai and discovers that it wasn't Di Massa, but Gilberte's father Jean-Baptiste Beaumont-Liégard who ran the drug operation during Leclercq's employment. In an act of retaliation, Leclercq turns Beaumont-Liégard's accomplices against him. As Jean-Baptiste Beaumont-Liégard is executed, Leclercq leaves the city satisfied with his revenge.

== Cast ==
- Jean-Paul Belmondo: François Leclercq
- Bernard Blier: Jean-Baptiste Beaumont-Liégard
- Marie-France Pisier: Gilberte Beaumont-Liégard, Jean-Baptiste's daughter
- François Perrot: Raphaël Di Massa
- Daniel Ivernel: Victor Verbruck, the mayor
- Claude Brosset: Oscar
- Yvonne Gaudeau: Madame Beaumont-Liégard
- René Lefèvre: Pierre Leclercq, François' father
- Michel Beaune: a childhood friend of François
- Nicole Garcia: Hélène Mauve/Duquesne
- Élisabeth Margoni: Karine Lechard
- Jacques David: Prosecutor Torillon
- Françoise Bertin: René's wife

== Score ==
Francis Lai's score was released by WIP Records in 1976.

1. Le Corps De Mon Ennemi (2:25)
2. Je Me Souviens De Ce Temps Là (1:06)
3. Je L'Aime, Elle M'Aimait (2:58)
4. Ma Ville À Perpétuité (1:55)
5. Magic's Power (3:19)
6. Mademoiselle (1:29)
7. Et Puis Tu M'As Oublié (0:52)
8. Your Hair In My Eyes (3:47)
9. Number One (3:36)
10. Je Me Souviens De Ce Temps Là (2:33)
11. Ma Ville, Mes Amours (1:52)
12. Jack Pot (3:21)
13. Je Ne Suis Pas Des Tiens (1:04)
14. La Valse Des Souvenirs (2:25)
15. Au Creux De La Nuit (0:56)
16. Le Corps De Mon Ennemi (2:25)
