= Pullman Paris Montparnasse Hotel =

Skyscraper hotel in France

- Pullman Paris Montparnasse Hotel, branded as Le Méridien in 2005
- Interactive map of the Pullman Paris Montparnasse Hotel area
- Former names: Paris-Sheraton Hotel; Hotel Montparnasse Park; Le Méridien Montparnasse

General information
- Type: Hotel
- Location: Paris 14th arrondissement, 19 rue du Commandant-René-Mouchotte (main entrance); 10 rue Vercingétorix (alternate entrance)
- Coordinates: 48°50′18″N 2°19′15″E
- Completed: 1974
- Owner: Bain Capital
- Management: Accor

Height
- Roof: 116 m (381 ft)

Technical details
- Floor count: 32

Design and construction
- Architect: Pierre Dufau
- Developer: SODEFRA

The Pullman Paris Montparnasse Hotel is a skyscraper hotel in the Montparnasse quarter, in the 14th arrondissement of Paris, France. It is part of the Vandamme Nord mixed use complex, which is currently known by the commercial name Les Ateliers Gaîté. With 957 rooms, it is the third-largest hotel in Paris after the Le Méridien Étoile and the Hyatt Regency Paris Étoile, and one of the French capital's major convention venues.

== Owner and tenant history ==
=== Hotel ===
The hotel and the adjoining Vandamme Nord complex were developed by Joseph Vaturi and his son Clément, Italians of Egyptian descent, who founded or owned a number of other luxury hotels. The hotel opened in 1974 as the Paris-Sheraton Hotel, managed by Sheraton Hotels and Resorts. The inaugural director was Raymond Marcelin, a veteran of several Paris luxury establishments, including the Grand Hôtel, the Prince de Galles and the Meurice.

In 1982, the Vaturis sold the complex to Swiss hospitality company The Nova-Park Group, which assumed direct management of the hotel, renamed the Montparnasse Park Hotel. Nova-Park went bankrupt in 1985, also bringing down the leadership of its primary lender, BPGF (Banque Privée de Gestion Financière), in a financial scandal.

In 1986, the complex was acquired in bankruptcy proceedings by Frankoparis, a pension fund managed by representatives of Air France's ground personnel with the backing of a Kuwaiti bank. The hotel's management rights were acquired by Air France's Le Méridien hotel division for FRF 30 million a year and the hotel was renamed Le Meridien Montparnasse on 1 July 1986. In 1998, mall operator Unibail (today Unibail-Rodamco-Westfield) purchased Frankoparis and its assets, including the Vandamme Nord complex. A 1999 renegotiation of the hotel's lease led to the award of an industry-high revenue share by French courts, although the decision was seemingly never enacted.

On 8 December 2010, France's Accor hotel group signed an agreement with Unibail-Rodamco to assume management of the hotel under its newly resurrected Pullman brand. Starman, a hotel investment company owned jointly by Starwood Capital and Lehman Brothers, sold its long leasehold interest and ownership of the hotel business to Unibail-Rodamco and the hotel became the Pullman Paris Montparnasse Hotel on 7 January 2011.

The hotel closed on 31 August 2017 for renovations, which included the addition of a roof terrace. It was set to reopen in May 2020, but the reopening was postponed to 27 December 2021, due to the COVID-19 pandemic.

The hotel is Pullman's largest European property.

Unibail-Rodamco-Westfield sold the hotel to Bain Capital in September 2025.

=== Catering ===
The hotel's historic restaurant was the defunct Montparnasse 25. It was awarded one star by the Michelin Guide in 1991 under Jean-Yves Guého, who was previously a chef for other Méridien hotel restaurants in the U.S. and Hong Kong. Future three-starred chef Christophe Bacquié was also trained at the establishment. In later years, it was headed by Christian Moine, a former second de cuisine at the Meurice. The restaurant suffered from a downsizing in personnel when Méridien was acquired by Starwood in 1998, and eventually closed its doors in July 2010. Other culinary offerings in the hotel's original incarnation were La Ruche, a fast food restaurant, and Le Corail, a lounge bar.

=== Corporate tenants ===
In addition to the offices located above the complex's mall, the hotel tower had its own corporate rental space. In the early stages of the project, it was announced that the lower floors of the hotel would house the European headquarters of Sheraton's parent company International Telephone and Telegraph. However, no later reference to this could be found. In 1974, the project's architect Pierre Dufau moved his agency to the hotel tower, which was its final location until his death in 1985. Upon Méridien's 1986 acquisition of the hotel, the chain set up its headquarters there until its 1994 sale to Forte Group, when its main offices moved to London, leaving a scaled down team in Paris. Records indicate that Méridien France transferred its location to the Tour Montparnasse in 2010.

The offices of Encyclopaedia Universalis and the Joseph Vaturi-owned Éditions de Montsouris, a subsidiary of which published the French edition of Tintin magazine, were also once located at the address. The fr:Press club de France, a network of professional journalists sponsored by Accor, was housed within the hotel between 2010 and 2017, when the latter closed for a lengthy remodel, forcing the group to relocate to Issy-les-Moulineaux.

== Building ==
Due to its integration into an ensemble of entertainment and shopping amenities, then a relatively unusual concept in the French hospitality industry, it was billed as the "first American-style Parisian hotel". Like much of the surrounding complex, the hotel was designed by star architect Pierre Dufau. Despite its bold appearance, it was given only one third of the usual budget for similarly sized hotels at the time, with some sources quoting a price tag as low as FRF 50 million. The hotel's walls are covered in factory-stamped steel panels hot painted with DuPont's Tedlar polymer, which gave the building the desired durability and character at a discount. Dufau would reuse that technique on later works such as the SNECMA headquarters in the neighboring 15th arrondissement.

Culminating at 116 metre, it was announced as Paris's future largest hotel and slated for a late 1973 or 1974 opening, suffering no major delays. Although advertisements often listed the more impressive number of 1000 rooms as a bullet point, the actual number was 962 (including 32 suites) in its original Sheraton incarnation. By the time of its entry into service, it had already been overtaken in terms of capacity by two competitors, the fr:Le Méridien Étoile and, narrowly, the Hôtel Concorde La Fayette.

In its original configuration, the hotel had 31 floors, 25 of which were reserved for the rooms. While the other parts of the hotel have seen significant alterations, the volume allocated to the rooms has remained practically the same, with only minor variations in their number. A "salon", or conference hall, was also present at the base of the tower, with an original capacity of 1,000 patrons. Two of the lower floors were also used as corporate rental space before the 2017 remodel.

=== Remodels ===
Following its acquisition by Méridien, the hotel was given a three-year makeover, projected at FRF 100 million in 1986, but retrospectively pegged at nearly three times more. The lobby was expanded vertically, and a new 2000-seat conference hall was also fitted out. The necessary space for the latter was gained from the phasing out of several underground facilities within the complex, including the Patinoire Gaîté-Montparnasse, an ice rink. A 2005 article named it as the largest hotel-integrated conference center in Europe at the time, with some 4,200 m^{2} (45,000 sq ft) of total space across all salons.

At the end of August 2017, the hotel closed for another major remodel, concurrent with a restructuring of the entire surrounding complex under the name Les Ateliers Gaîté. Initially planned for May 2020, the reopening was postponed to 27 December 2021, in part due to the COVID-19 pandemic. While the adjacent complex's redesign was overseen by Dutch urbanists MVRDV, work on the hotel itself was entrusted to newcomers Cut Architecture, at a cost of €100 million. The number of room stayed relatively stable at 957, including 12 suites and 4 apartments. The entrance's layout was further modified, now extending above street level and taking up part of the first floor. The conference rooms were moved from the underground levels to a three-floor section located above the entrance. The corporate rental space that occupied two of the lower levels was phased out to make room for the new setup. Former service rooms located on top of the building were converted into a 32nd floor rooftop bar. It was billed at launch as the highest open air bar in the city, although a spate of similar venues has made the claim less definitive. It is the first European Skybar, a branded type of rooftop bar based on an original venue found at Los Angeles's Mondrian.

== Notable guests ==
- During the 1980s, the Palestine Liberation Organization rented a room year-round at the Méridien for its various dignitaries. On 8 June 1992, high ranking PLO officer Atef Bseiso was assassinated in front of the hotel after dining there with several acquaintances, an act that was widely attributed to the MOSSAD.
- Jeune Afrique has called the hotel "a favorite establishment of numerous African rulers", among them president of Senegal Macky Sall.
- During the 51st FIFA Congress in 1998, the hotel serves at the African delegates' residence, and hosted an address by Federation president Sepp Blatter to CONCACAF representatives.

== Notable events ==
- 1978 assembly of the fr:Comité des intellectuels pour l'Europe des libertés, a gathering of anti-communist intellectuals backed by the C.I.A. Among announced guest speakers were Alberto Moravia, Fernando Arrabal and Claude Chabrol.
- Nicolas Sarkozy's foreign policy address to the international press (2007 French presidential election)
- 32nd ICANN International Public Meeting (2016)

== See also ==
- Skyscraper
- List of tallest structures in Paris
