= The Night Caller (1975 film) =

- Theatrical release poster
- Directed by: Henri Verneuil
- Screenplay by: Henri Venneuil; Jean Laborde; Francis Veber
- Story by: Henri Verneuil
- Produced by: Jacques Juranville
- Starring: Jean-Paul Belmondo
- Cinematography: Jean Penzer
- Edited by: Pierre Gillette; Henri Lanoë
- Music by: Ennio Morricone
- Production companies: Cerito Films; Mondial Te.Fi.
- Release dates: April 9, 1975 (France); April 24, 1975 (Italy)
- Running time: 125 minutes
- Countries: France; Italy
- Language: French
- Budget: 20 million francs

The Night Caller (French: Peur sur la ville) is a 1975 crime film directed by Henri Verneuil and starring Jean-Paul Belmondo. It was the first time Belmondo played a police officer.

It was released in the United States and the United Kingdom as The Night Caller which was cut from a 125 minute run time to 91 minutes.

== Plot ==
Policeman Jean Letellier is under pressure, because the infamous gangster Marcucci escaped from him publicly. Moreover, during the pursuit an innocent bystander was killed by a stray bullet. Letellier is investigated for having fired the deadly bullet.

Before Letellier is cleared, a serial killer begins to murder young women, each time leaving a weird message at the site of crime. He calls himself "Minos", referring to the Divine Comedy. The murderer always declares he had punished his victims for what he considers their impure life style.

While Letellier still has no trace of Minos, he comes across Marcucci's current whereabouts. Just as before, Marcucci tries to escape in a spectacular manner when Letellier confronts him. But this time Marcucci dies in the course of action.

Marcucci's death is no relief for Letellier who is now publicly accused of having neglected the Minos case in favour of settling his personal feud with his late archenemy.

Minos keeps on murdering and leaving provoking hints until Letellier can identify him. The serial killer can only scarcely elude Letellier, who chases him over the roofs of Paris. His next coup is to take hostages in a skyscraper. Letellier decides he has had it and goes airborne. From a flying helicopter he jumps through the window into the flat and puts Minos down.

== Cast ==
- Jean-Paul Belmondo as Jean Letellier
- Charles Denner as Charles Moissac
- Giovanni Cianfriglia as Marcucci
- Adalberto Maria Merli as Minos
- Jean Martin as Inspector Sabin
- Lea Massari as Norah Elmer
- Rosy Varte as Germaine Doizon
- Catherine Morin as Hélène Grammont
- Jean-François Balmer as Julien Dallas
- Albert Delpy as Henri Vernellic

== Production ==
Following his spy film Night Flight from Moscow (1973), director Henri Verneuil began work on an urban-based crime film for actor Jean-Paul Belmondo, it would be their sixth collaboration on a film. The film was a co-production between France and Italy, with the 70% being funded by Belmondo's own French film company Cerito Films based in France and 30% being from the Rome-based company Mondial Te.Fi. The film was developed as an attempt to reconquer box office in France after the underwhelming commercial and critical reception to Belmondo's previous film Stavisky (1974). The Night Caller marked the first time Belmondo would play a police officer, a type of role he would return to in the following years.

While Verneuil said he got the idea for the film from actress Francoise Fabian who was receiving harassing phone calls from a stalker, the company Cerito acquired the rights to Lillian O'Donnell's 1972 novel The Phone Calls, the first in the Norah Mulcahaney series. While early promotional ads in magazines mention O'Donnel's book as an inspiration, the films credits make no mention literary reference for the story where it is only credited to Verneuil.

Filming took place between late October and December 1974 with a budget of 20 million francs.

== Release ==
The Night Caller was released as Peur sur la ville in France on April 9, 1975. The film at the time was shown at 150 venues across France and had a record advertising budget of 1.5 million francs. The authors of French Thrillers of the 1970s: Volume I, Crime Films said the film opened to an "extraordinary box office" with nearly four million admittances, making it Belmondo's highest grossing film since The Burglars (1971). It was the second highest grossing film in France that year, only being beaten by The Towering Inferno (1974).

The film also performed well in the box office in Germany and Italy. It was released in Italy as Il poliziotto della brigata criminale (lit. 'The Cop from the Crime Squad') on April 24, 1975. It gross over 2.139 million Italian lire in Italy, nearly equaling the most successful Italian crime thriller of the year, Violent Rome (1975).

The film was released in the United Kingdom on November 14, 1975, and in the United States on November 19, 1975. It was distributed by Columbia Pictures in the United states as The Night Caller, where it's running time was cut to 91 minutes.

The film was released on VHS in France with a 90 minute runtime in 1992, and later on DVD in 2001 with a 120 minute runtime.

== Reception ==
The New York Times said "it seems to be two completely different movies, neither of them up to much." The Los Angeles Times thought the action sequences "keep an otherwise routine film entertaining." Time Out said Belmondo is "piling stunt on daredevil stunt and risking his neck for a particularly silly story", and "desperately little of the film's energy" goes into the plot.
