= Une chance sur deux =

1998 film by Patrice Leconte

- Directed by: Patrice Leconte
- Written by: Patrick Dewolf, Serge Frydman and Patrice Leconte
- Produced by: Christian Fechner
- Starring: Jean-Paul Belmondo, Alain Delon, Vanessa Paradis
- Cinematography: Steven Poster
- Edited by: Joëlle Hache
- Music by: Alexandre Desplat
- Distributed by: UGC Fox Distribution
- Release date: March 25, 1998
- Running time: 110 min
- Country: France
- Language: French
- Budget: €22,17 million
- Box office: 1,056,810 admissions (France)

Une chance sur deux is a French film directed by Patrice Leconte, released in 1998, and starring Jean-Paul Belmondo, Alain Delon and Vanessa Paradis.

== Synopsis ==
Alice (Vanessa Paradis) leaves prison after having served an eight-month sentence for car theft. Her mother, who has just died, leaves her a cassette on which she admits to the mystery of her birth. Alice has never known her father. Twenty years before, her mother had loved two men (Belmondo, Delon). One of them is, unknowingly, her father. Alice goes off to find the two, but before discovering which is her father she gets them involved in an adventure.

== Production ==
- Director : Patrice Leconte
- Screenplay : Patrick Dewolf, Serge Frydman and Patrice Leconte
- From a story by Bruno Tardon
- Production : Christian Fechner
  - Executive producer : Hervé Truffaut
- Company : Les Films Christian Fechner, TF1 Films Production
- Original music : Alexandre Desplat
- Photography : Steven Poster
- Editing : Joëlle Hache
- Art direction : Ivan Maussion
- Costumes : Annie Périer
- Country : France
- Genre : Comedy / Action
- Length : 110 minutes
- Distributor : UGC Fox Distribution
- Release dates :
  - France : 25 March 1998
  - Belgium : 1 April 1998

== Cast ==
- Jean-Paul Belmondo: Léo Brassac
- Alain Delon: Julien Vignal
- Vanessa Paradis: Alice Tomaso
- Michel Aumont: Ledoyen
- Eric Defosse: Carella
- Aleksandr Yakovlev (actor): Trenchcoat killer
- Valeri Gatayev: Anatoli Sharkov
- Sandrine Caron: Maître d'hôtel
- Véronique Hubert
- Luis Jaime-Cortez: Ángel Vargas
- M'bembo: Maryline
- Philippe Magnan: Juge prison
- Daniel Millot: Brigadier
- Marie Neplaz
- Bobby Pacha
- Olivier Parenty: Adjoint Carella
- Pascal Perbost
- Paul Poggi: Monsieur Perolaz
- Guillaume Rannou
- Vincent Roger: Le photographe
- Jacques Roman: Maitre Varinot
- Paola Sapone
- Vincent Skimenti: Paco
- Philippe Vieux
