= Le Marginal =

- Directed by: Jacques Deray
- Written by: Jacques Deray; Jean Herman; Michel Audiard
- Produced by: Alain Belmondo
- Starring: Jean-Paul Belmondo
- Cinematography: Xaver Schwarzenberger
- Edited by: Albert Jürgenson
- Music by: Ennio Morricone
- Production companies: Cerito Films; Les Films Ariane
- Distributed by: Gaumont Distribution; Éditions René Chateau
- Release date: 26 October 1983 (France)
- Running time: 100 minutes
- Country: France
- Language: French
- Box office: 4,956,922 admissions (France)

Le Marginal is a 1983 French crime film directed by Jacques Deray and starring Jean-Paul Belmondo. The music for the film was composed by Ennio Morricone.

== Plot ==
Policeman Philippe Jordan works in Marseille. He intercepts the delivery of a shipload of heroin by jumping out of a helicopter onto a speedboat and throws all drugs into the sea. Drug lord Mecacci is desperate to get rid of Jordan and arranges an incident which leads to Jordan's disciplinary transfer. Jordan continues to fight against the drug cartel after all. He finds a valuable witness named "Freddy, the chemist" but Mecacci has Freddy killed before he can testify. When Mecacci's henchmen also murder Jordan's old friend Francis Pierron, Jordan retaliates immediately. Now Mecacci tries to lure him into a deadly trap. After Jordan has outsmarted Mecacci's killers he confronts their boss. The time for the final showdown has come.

== Cast ==
- Jean-Paul Belmondo as Philippe Jordan
- Henry Silva as Sauveur Mecacci
- Carlos Sotto Mayor as Livia Maria Dolores
- Pierre Vernier as Inspector Rojinski
- Maurice Barrier as Tonton
- Claude Brosset as Antonio Baldi
- Tchéky Karyo as Francis Pierron
- Michel Robin as Alfred Gonet
- Jean-Claude Dreyfus as The Transvestite

== Reception ==
"Le Marginal" was described as a "typical Jean-Paul Belmondo vehicle". With 4,956,922 tickets sold, it was the third most watched feature film in France in 1983.
