= Itinerary of a Spoiled Child =

Itinéraire d'un enfant gâté
- Directed by: Claude Lelouch
- Written by: Claude Lelouch
- Produced by: Jean-Paul Belmondo; Claude Lelouch
- Starring: Jean-Paul Belmondo
- Cinematography: Jean-Yves Le Mener
- Edited by: Sophie Bhaud
- Music by: Francis Lai
- Distributed by: Les Films 13; AFMD
- Release date: 1988
- Running time: 125 minutes
- Country: France
- Language: French

Itinerary of a Spoiled Child or Itinéraire d'un enfant gâté is a 1988 French film directed by Claude Lelouch.

== Synopsis ==
A foundling, raised in the circus, Sam Lion becomes a businessman after a trapeze accident. However, when he reaches fifty and becomes tired of his responsibilities and of his son Jean-Philippe, he decides to disappear at sea. However, he runs into Albert Duvivier, one of his former employees. He comes to realise that he has ignored the important things in his life.

== Cast ==
- Jean-Paul Belmondo as Sam Lion
- Richard Anconina as Albert Duvivier
- Marie-Sophie L. as Victoria Lion
- Jean-Philippe Chatrier as Jean-Philippe Lion
- Lio as Yvette
- Daniel Gélin as Pierre Duvivier
- Béatrice Agenin as Corinne
- Michel Beaune as Lawyer Vergne
- Pierre Vernier as The monk
- Gila von Weitershausen
- Sabine Haudepin
- Pierre Leroux as the Barman of Bel Air Hotel (uncredited)
- Arthur Brauss

== Reception ==
The film had admissions in France of 3,254,100.

== Awards ==
- César for best actor for Jean-Paul Belmondo 1989
- Prize for best actor at the Chicago Film Festival for Richard Anconina
