= Les Morfalous =

- Original film poster
- Directed by: Henri Verneuil
- Written by: Michel Audiard; Pierre Siniac
- Produced by: Alain Belmondo; Tarak Ben Ammar
- Starring: Jean-Paul Belmondo
- Cinematography: Edmond Séchan
- Edited by: Pierre Gillette
- Music by: Georges Delerue
- Distributed by: Acteurs Auteurs Associés
- Release date: 28 March 1984
- Running time: 102 minutes
- Country: France
- Language: French
- Box office: 3,612,400 admissions (France)

Les Morfalous (The Greedy-Guts, in French argot; English title: The Vultures) is a 1984 French adventure film, starring Jean-Paul Belmondo and directed by Henri Verneuil, featuring the French Foreign Legion during the Second World War. It is a remake of the 1970 American war film Kelly's Heroes.

== Plot ==
In French Tunisia, during the Second World War, a convoy of the French Foreign Legion is charged to recover gold bars of six billion francs from a bank in El Ksour to bring them into a safe place for the French government. On 5 April 1943, the contingent enters the seemingly abandoned and partially destroyed town. Unbeknownst to them, a German platoon holds the town and ambushes the FFL convoy, killing most of them. Only four legionnaires - Sergent Augagneur, Adjudant Mahuzard, and legionnaires Boissier and Borzik - survive the attack and take refuge in a hotel in ruins, where they find corpulent and pusillanimous artilleryman Béral, the only survivor of his unit.

At night, Mahuzard and Borzik head out to recover arms and ammunition, but Borzik is killed. Then two German soldiers are sent out to finish off the survivors, but the legionnaries kill them. After donning their uniforms, Augagneur and Béral sneak out and use a howitzer on the Germans, killing them all except Captain Ulrich Dieterle, the platoon's commander, who reports the ongoings in town to his commander.

In the aftermath, Augagneur and Boissier want to steal the gold for themselves, but Mahuzard wishes to continue the original mission. A fight breaks out between Mahuzard and Augagneur; Augagneur wins and takes Mahuzard under arrest, as François de La Roche-Fréon, the manager of the bank arrives. Augagneur tries to seduce Helene, François' wife. They are interrupted by the German lieutenant Karl Brenner, who became friendly with Helen during the occupation, arriving in a tank. Helen helps Augagneur capture Karl and suggests they take the gold and sell it to an American launderer, Bob Turner, and split it three ways.

Meanwhile, in the bank, Mahuzard convinces Béral to release him. He captures Augagneur and Karl upon their return and locks them in a vault with Boissier. Mahuzard has dinner with François and Helene, who steals the key to the vault and releases Augagneur, Boissier and Karl. They return with the tank and surprise Mahuzard and Béral, who have just completed the loading of gold in an armored car and prepare to leave.

In the meantime, François electrocutes himself to death by urinating on a live wire. When Augagneur spots Dieterle observing them, he uses the tank's main gun to kill him. He then sends Boissier to seize the van, but Mahuzard shoots Boissier dead. Karl fires the tank and completely destroys the van containing the gold, killing Mahuzard and Béral instantly. Helene tries to get Augagneur to kill Karl, but he refuses, and Karl also reveals Helene made the same offer to him against Augagneur. The two ex-soldiers load the bulk of the gold on the truck, leaving only 300 kilos of gold to Helene while they take 10,000.

Augagneur and Karl head south in the tank to sell the gold, but have to stop at a German filling station to refuel. After the tank is refueled, Karl tries to abscond, but Augagneur manages to jump on. When Karl reaches the coastline to reorient himself, Augagneur forces him to give up the tank at gunpoint and leaves him behind. Near the town of Batahoua, he meets with Turner and agrees to stay the night in the tank while Turner fetches the money for the gold, but the next morning Augagneur finds himself surrounded by American and FFL troops. Putting up a patriotic front, he pretends to have rescued the gold, losing him the money but earning him military honors and the attention of Mrs. Chanterelle, the wife of the president of the French North African Bank Group.

The film concludes with a quote from Blaise Cendrars: "I was the richest man in the world, [but] gold has ruined me."

== Cast ==
- Jean-Paul Belmondo as Sergent Pierre Augagneur
- Michel Constantin as Adjudant Edouard Mahuzard
- Marie Laforêt as Hélène de La Roche-Fréon
- Michel Creton as Légionnaire Boissier
- Jacques Villeret as Brigadier Béral
- François Perrot as François de La Roche-Fréon
- Maurice Auzel as Légionnaire Borzik
- Matthias Habich as Oberstleutnant Karl Brenner
- Pierre Semmler as Hauptmann Ulrich Dieterle

== Production ==
Verneuil was developing the project for a number of years and was thinking of casting Victor Lanoux when Belmondo read the script and wanted to do it. Filming took place on location in Tunisia.

== Reception ==
The film was the sixth most popular movie of 1984 in France. However its box office performance was considered a slight disappointment.

== See also ==
- French Foreign Legion in popular culture
- French cinema
