= Happy Easter =

1984 film by Georges Lautner

- Theatrical release poster
- French: Joyeuses Pâques
- Directed by: Georges Lautner
- Adaptation by: Jean Poiret; Georges Lautner
- Dialogue by: Jean Poiret
- Produced by: Alain Sarde; Alain Belmondo
- Starring: Jean-Paul Belmondo; Sophie Marceau; Marie Laforêt
- Cinematography: Edmond Séchan
- Edited by: Michelle David
- Music by: Philippe Sarde
- Production companies: Cérito Films; Sara Films
- Distributed by: AMLF
- Release date: 24 October 1984
- Running time: 98 minutes
- Country: France
- Language: French
- Box office: 3,428,900 admissions (France)

Happy Easter (French: Joyeuses Pâques) is a 1984 French comedy film directed by Georges Lautner and adapted from the 1980 play by Jean Poiret. It stars Jean-Paul Belmondo, Sophie Marceau and Marie Laforêt. The film follows a philandering businessman who, when caught by his wife with a much younger woman, passes the woman off as his daughter from a previous marriage.

== Plot ==
In Nice, Stéphane Margelle is a wealthy businessman and an incorrigible womaniser in his 50s. At the airport, shortly after dropping his childless wife Sophie off so she can go away for the Easter weekend, he meets Julie, a young woman who has just had a fight with her married lover. With nowhere to spend the night, Julie agrees to go back to Stéphane's apartment. To her surprise and his horror, Sophie returns, unable to complete her journey because of a strike. To cover his tracks, Stéphane lies that Julie is a secret daughter from a previous marriage who lives in Limoges. When Julie claims that she is pregnant, Sophie invites the young woman to sleep in the guest room.

The next morning, Stéphane awakens Julie so she can leave on the first train to Limoges, but Sophie instead takes her shopping and later drives her to the couple's house in Saint-Paul-de-Vence while Stéphane negotiates a deal with William Rousseau, a socialist civil servant who hates capitalists. Hospitalised following a minor accident, Stéphane flees in an ambulance, causing widespread panic in the streets, before arriving by taxi in Saint-Paul, where his business associates—including Rousseau—and their wives have gathered for his birthday dinner. When Julie feigns interest in socialism and philosophy, Rousseau is charmed by her.

The dinner is interrupted by Julie's vulgar mother, Marlène Chataigneau, who bursts in drunkenly to reclaim her daughter and causes a scene before ultimately passing out. Dismissing Stéphane as a womaniser who drove his ex-wife to alcoholism, Rousseau leaves, but not before inviting Julie to a conference where he is speaking the next day. In the morning, Marlène, informed of the ruse by Julie, plays along. However, Sophie privately tells Julie that she knew the truth all along, hoping that Stéphane himself will admit the masquerade.

After learning that Rousseau invited Julie to his conference, Stéphane bursts violently into the conference and confronts Rousseau, resulting in a physical altercation. In the ensuing mayhem, Stéphane is arrested by the police, though Sophie gets him released thanks to the intervention of a young police commissioner she knew as a child. Stéphane returns home to find Sophie alone with the commissioner, prompting Sophie to pass him off as her son.

== Cast ==
- Jean-Paul Belmondo as Stéphane Margelle
- Sophie Marceau as Julie
- Marie Laforêt as Sophie Margelle
- Rosy Varte as Marlène Chataigneau, Julie's mother
- Michel Beaune as Rousseau
- Marie-Christine Descouard as Miss Fleury
- Gérard Hernandez as the waiter at the Indian restaurant
- Marc Lamole as the doctor

== See also ==
- List of Easter films
