= Le Guignolo =

- Directed by: Georges Lautner
- Written by: Jean Herman; Michel Audiard
- Produced by: Alain Poiré
- Starring: Jean-Paul Belmondo; Michel Galabru; Georges Géret; Michel Beaune
- Cinematography: Henri Decaë
- Edited by: Michelle David
- Music by: Philippe Sarde
- Distributed by: Gaumont Distribution
- Release date: 26 March 1980 (France)
- Running time: 107 minutes
- Countries: France; Italy
- Language: French
- Box office: 2,876,016 admissions (France)

Le Guignolo is a 1980 French-Italian comedy film directed by Georges Lautner. The title is Italian prison slang for a "third-rate crook."

== Plot ==
The swindler Alexander Dupre (Jean-Paul Belmondo) is released from prison ahead of schedule for good behavior, and immediately rushes to make up for lost time during his incarceration. Posing as an Indian prince, he goes on a cruise ship with the jet set, during which he meets with dazzling beauty Pamela George Eagleton (Mirella D'Angelo), a rich lady, the wife of a diamond mines owner, who has ended up in a difficult financial situation. As an honorable man the "Prince" could not refuse to offer his assistance to the lady in need and agrees to buy her diamonds. After paying in fake bills, Alexander prepares to remove the stones from the frame and discovers that they are also fakes. "Pamela" turns out to be Sophie - a fraud, exactly like himself. The couple leaves together from the ship. The next victim of their collaboration was to become the Duke of Helmuth von Nassau (Pierre Vernier). Sophie was supposed to seduce him, and then Alexander who was to be introduced as her brother, was going to fake a suicide attempt for the reason of bankruptcy. The Duke would simply have to provide financial support for the brother of his beloved. But unexpectedly to Sophie, the Duke proposes to her and writes a check for 500,000, and the criminal plan immediately flies out of her head, and the unfortunate "suicide trier" almost loses his life. Seizing the check from Sophie and wishing all the best for the future spouses, Alexander sends out to implement a different plan. His way is to Venice.

In the plane one of the passengers requests him to carry his bag, given to him by his mistress through customs to avoid explanations to his wife. Alexander agrees to do this favor to him, but upon his arrival witnesses a murder of the owner of the suitcase. It came to light that the victim was a brilliant physicist and mathematician who has developed a new kind of fuel that can replace oil, which has naturally angered the Arab oil tycoons. After unsuccessful attempts to buy the invention, they decided to get rid of the inventor. But the microfilm with the description of the secret technology was in the suitcase given to Alexander unbeknownst to him. The hunt begins for him, and he unsuspectingly under the name of viscount de Valombreza goes to the hotel where he has an appointment with the Japanese, where he intends to sell a fake painting by Canaletto.

== Cast ==
- Jean-Paul Belmondo: Alexandre Dupré
- Georges Géret: Joseph
- Michel Galabru: Achille Sureau
- Carla Romanelli: Gina
- Von Gretchen Shepard: Caroline, agent X-22
- Mirella D'Angelo: Sophie / Pamela
- Pierre Vernier: Helmut Von Nassau
- Paolo Bonacelli: Kamal
- Michel Beaune: Louis Fréchet
- Tony Kendall : Frantz
- Maurice Auzel: French tourist
- Henri Guybet: Machavoine, "the plumber"
- Lily Fayol: Mrs. Schwarz, the rich American on the cruise ship
- Philippe Castelli: Doorman
- Charles Gérard: Abdel Fahrad
- Anne Goddet: Irène
- Jean-François Calvé: Ministro
- Jean Luisi: Jailkeeper, chef
- Renzo Marignano: Jeweler
- Vincenzo Guarini: Police commissioner
- Aldo Rendine: Urbino Alfonsi
- Michel Berreur: Hussein
- Dona Leigh Kessler: Blonde
- Daniel Breton: Yasser
- Luong Ham Chau: Ohsawah
- Thang-Long: Taramushi
- Jacques Ramade: Coughing servant
- Alain David Gabison: Prison Director

== Reception ==
The film grossed $8 million in its first three weeks of release in France.
