= Jacques Deray =

French film director and screenwriter (1929–2003)

- Deray in 1995
- Born: Jacques Desrayaud; 19 February 1929; Lyon, France
- Died: 10 August 2003 (aged 74); Boulogne-Billancourt, France
- Occupations: Film director screenwriter
- Years active: 1952–1995

Jacques Deray (born Jacques Desrayaud, 19 February 1929 – 9 August 2003) was a French film director and screenwriter. Deray is prominently known for directing many crime and thriller films.

== Biography ==
Born Jacques Desrayaud in Lyon, France, in 1929 to a family of Lyon industrialists. At the age of 19 he went to Paris to study drama under René Simon. Deray played minor roles on the stage and in films from the age of 19. From 1952, Deray worked as assistant to a number of directors, including Luis Buñuel, Gilles Grangier, Jules Dassin, and Jean Boyer.

Deray's first film was the drama The Gigolo released in 1960. Deray was fascinated by American film noir and began to focus on crime stories. Deray's early work includes Du rififi à Tokyo, an homage to Jules Dassin's Rififi. Deray's reputation was established with the 1969 film La Piscine which starred Romy Schneider and Alain Delon. La Piscine was not distributed widely outside France, but the follow-up gave Deray his biggest international hit with Borsalino, a film starring Delon and Jean-Paul Belmondo about two small-time gangsters who murder their way to the top in bustling 1930s Marseille.

Deray became dedicated to the genre that won him favor with audiences and continued to make thrillers, action films, and spy films throughout the rest of his career adapting works of both French and English authors including Georges Simenon, Jean-Patrick Manchette, and Derek Raymond. In 1981, Deray served as president of the jury of the 34th Cannes Film Festival. Deray's last theatrical release was The Teddy Bear in 1994. Deray worked professionally in television until his death in 2003. On his death, French President Jacques Chirac praised Deray, noting his "innate sense of storytelling and action" and adding that "France has lost one of its most talented filmmakers."

== Jacques Deray Prize ==
Created by in 2005 to honor Deray, who served as vice-president of the Institut Lumière until his death, the Jacques Deray Prize rewards the best French crime-thriller film of the year. Among the first laureates are 36 Quai des Orfèvres by Olivier Marchal, The Beat That My Heart Skipped by Jacques Audiard, Tell No One by Guillaume Canet, The Second Wind by Alain Corneau, and later Polisse by Maïwenn (2012).

== Filmography ==
- 1960: The Gigolo
- 1963: Rififi in Tokyo
- 1963: Symphonie pour un massacre
- 1965: Crime on a Summer Morning
- 1966: To Skin a Spy
- 1966: That Man George
- 1969: La Piscine
- 1970: Borsalino
- 1971: Easy, Down There!
- 1971: Un peu de soleil dans l'eau froide
- 1972: The Outside Man
- 1974: Borsalino & Co.
- 1975: Flic Story
- 1977: Le Gang
- 1978: Butterfly on the Shoulder
- 1980: Three Men to Kill
- 1983: Le Marginal
- 1985: He Died with His Eyes Open
- 1987: Le Solitaire
- 1987: Maladie d'amour
- 1989: Les Bois noirs
- 1991: Contre l'oubli (film collection)
- 1991: Netchaïev est de retour
- 1993: Un crime
- 1994: 3000 scénarios contre un virus (segment « Arnaud et ses copains »)
- 1994: The Teddy Bear
- 1998: Clarissa (TV movie)
- 2000: On n'a qu'une vie (TV movie)
- 2002: Lettre d'une inconnue (TV movie)
