= Jean-Paul Belmondo =

French actor (1933–2021)

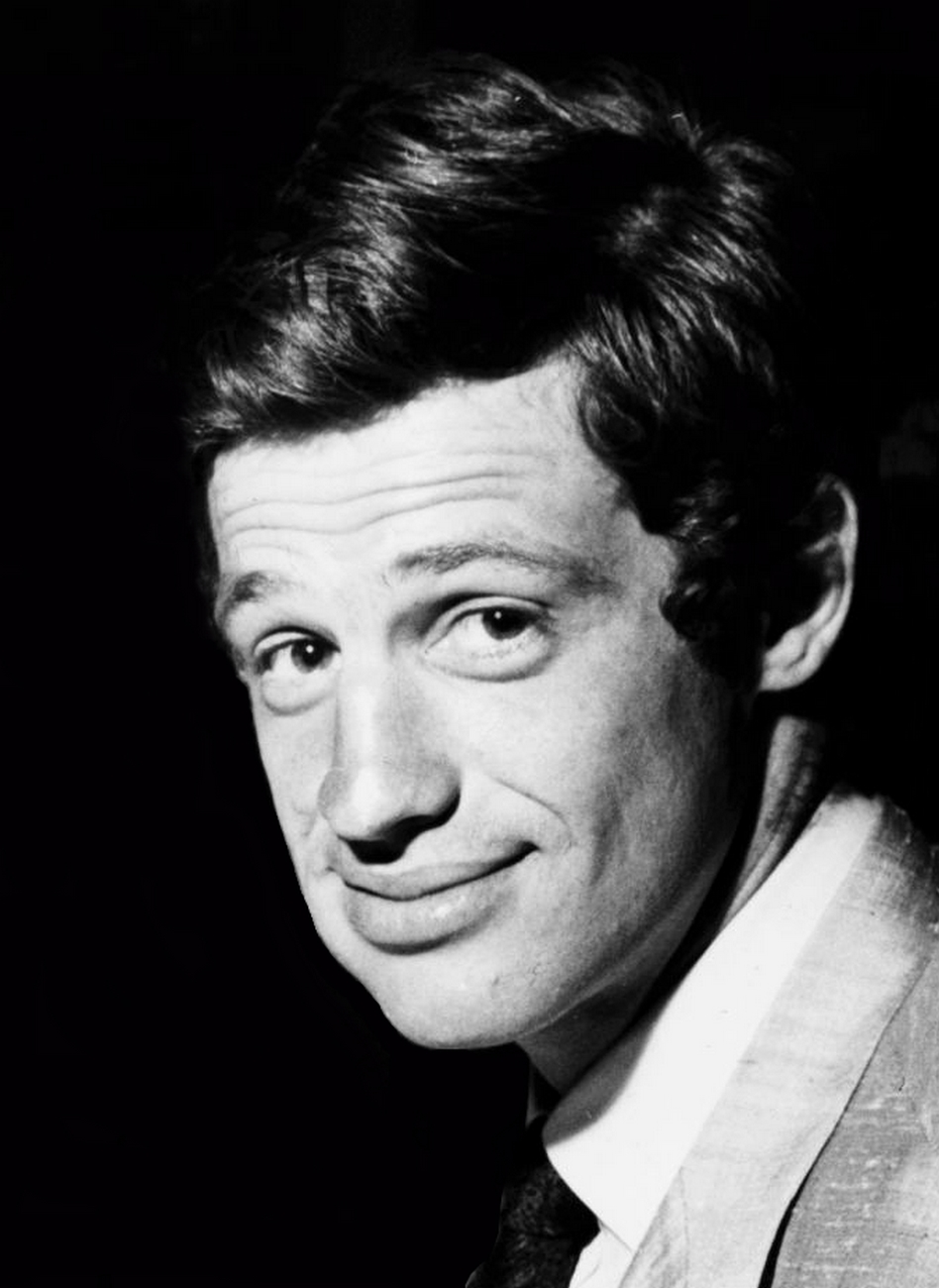
- Belmondo in 1960
- Born: Jean-Paul Charles Belmondo; 9 April 1933; Neuilly-sur-Seine, France
- Died: 6 September 2021 (aged 88); Paris, France
- Other name: Bébel
- Education: Conservatoire of Dramatic Arts
- Occupations: Actor, film and play producer, film distributor
- Years active: 1953–2016
- Spouses: Élodie Constantin (m. 1952; div. 1968) Natty Tardivel (m. 2002; div. 2008)
- Partner(s): Ursula Andress (1965–1972); Laura Antonelli (1972–1980); Maria Carlos Sotto Mayor (1980–1987 and 2020); Barbara Gandolfi (2008–2012)
- Children: 4, Patricia, Florence, Paul and Stella
- Parents: Paul Belmondo (father); Sarah Rainaud-Richard (mother)
- Awards: Full list

Signature
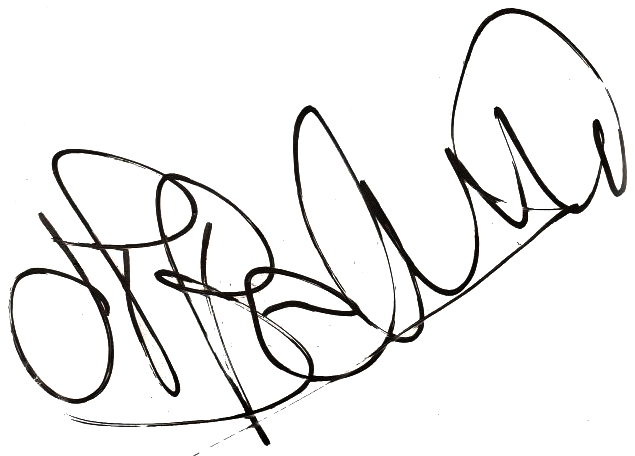

Jean-Paul Charles Belmondo (French: [ʒɑ̃pɔl ʃaʁl(ə) bɛlmɔ̃do]; 9 April 1933 – 6 September 2021) was a French actor, producer and distributor. Initially associated with the New Wave of the 1960s thanks to the success of the film Breathless (1960), he also acted in other films that modernized cinema such as Two Women (1960), Le Doulos (1962), That Man from Rio (1964), Greed in the Sun (1964), and Weekend at Dunkirk (1964). With the film That Man from Rio, he also became a stuntman.

In 1971, he became a film producer and distributor. He then steered his acting career towards commercial cinema starting in 1975. An undisputed box-office champion from the 1960s to the 1980s along with Louis de Funès and Alain Delon, Belmondo attracted nearly 160 million viewers over his 50-year career. He notably appeared four times in the most watched French film of the year in France: The Brain (1969), The Night Caller (1975), Animal (1977), and Ace of Aces (1982); he was only surpassed on this point by Louis de Funès. Having also acted in theatre in his early career, he returned to the scene in Kean (1987) and achieved success. He subsequently reduced his film appearances to focus on his theatre work. In the early 1990s he became the owner of the Théâtre des Variétés in Paris, where he produced the highly successful play Le Dîner de Cons.

Belmondo frequently played heroic, brave, virile characters, which made him popular with a wide audience both in France and abroad. Despite being heavily courted by Hollywood, Belmondo did not attempt to pursue an American career. He also played more profound roles, notably in Léon Morin, Priest (1961) and Mississippi Mermaid (1969). During his career, he was called the French counterpart of actors such as James Dean, Marlon Brando and Humphrey Bogart. Described as an icon and national treasure of France, Belmondo was seen as an influential actor in French cinema and an important figure in shaping European cinema. He was nominated for two BAFTA Awards throughout his career. In 2011, Belmondo received the Honorary Palme d'Or, in 2016 the Golden Lion for Lifetime Achievement, and in 2017 he received a tribute from the César Academy at the 42nd César Awards.

== Early life ==
Jean-Paul Belmondo was born in Neuilly-sur-Seine, a suburb of Paris, on 9 April 1933. Belmondo's father, Paul Belmondo, was a Pied-Noir sculptor who was born in Algeria of Italian descent, whose parents were of Sicilian and Piedmontese origin. His mother, Sarah Madeleine Rainaud-Richard, was a painter. As a boy, he was more interested in sport than school, developing a particular interest in boxing and soccer.

Belmondo made his amateur boxing debut on 10 May 1949 in Paris when he knocked out René Desmarais in one round. Belmondo's boxing career was undefeated, but brief. He won three straight first-round knockout victories from 1949 to 1950. "I stopped when the face I saw in the mirror began to change", he later said.

He did his National Service in French Algeria where he may have broken his nose "with a rifle butt to end his military service."

Belmondo was interested in acting. His late teenage years were spent at a private drama school, and he began performing comedy sketches in the provinces. He studied under Raymond Giraud and then attended the Conservatoire of Dramatic Arts when he was twenty. He studied there for three years. He probably would have won the prize for best actor, but he participated in a sketch mocking the school, which offended the jury; this resulted in his getting only an honourable mention, "which nearly set off a riot among his incensed fellow students" in August 1956, according to one report. The incident made front-page news.

== Career ==
=== 1950s ===
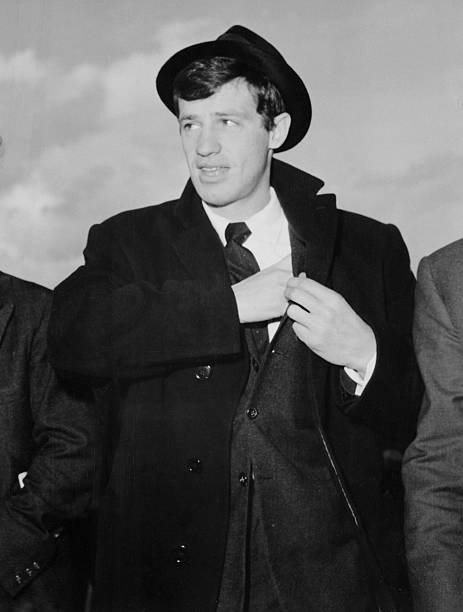
Belmondo in Rome in 1962

Belmondo's acting career properly began in 1953, with two performances at the Théâtre de l'Atelier in Paris in Jean Anouilh's Médée and Georges Neveux's Zamore. Belmondo began touring the provinces with friends including Annie Girardot and Guy Bedos.

Belmondo first appeared in the short Moliere (1956). His first film role was a scene with Jean-Pierre Cassel in On Foot, on Horse, and on Wheels (1957), which was cut from the final film; however he had a bigger part in the follow-up A Dog, a Mouse, and a Sputnik (1958).

Belmondo had a small role in the comedy Be Beautiful But Shut Up (1958), appearing with Alain Delon, followed by a role as a gangster in Young Sinners (1958), directed by Marcel Carné.

Belmondo supported Bourvil and Arletty in Sunday Encounter (1958). Jean-Luc Godard directed him in a short, Charlotte and Her Boyfriend (1958), where Belmondo's voice was dubbed by Godard after Belmondo was conscripted into the army. As part of his compulsory military service, he served in Algeria as a private for six months.

Belmondo's first lead role was in Les Copains du dimanche (1958). He later had a supporting part in An Angel on Wheels (1959) with Romy Schneider then appeared in Web of Passion (1959) for Claude Chabrol. He played D'Artagnan in The Three Musketeers (1959) for French television.

=== 1960s ===
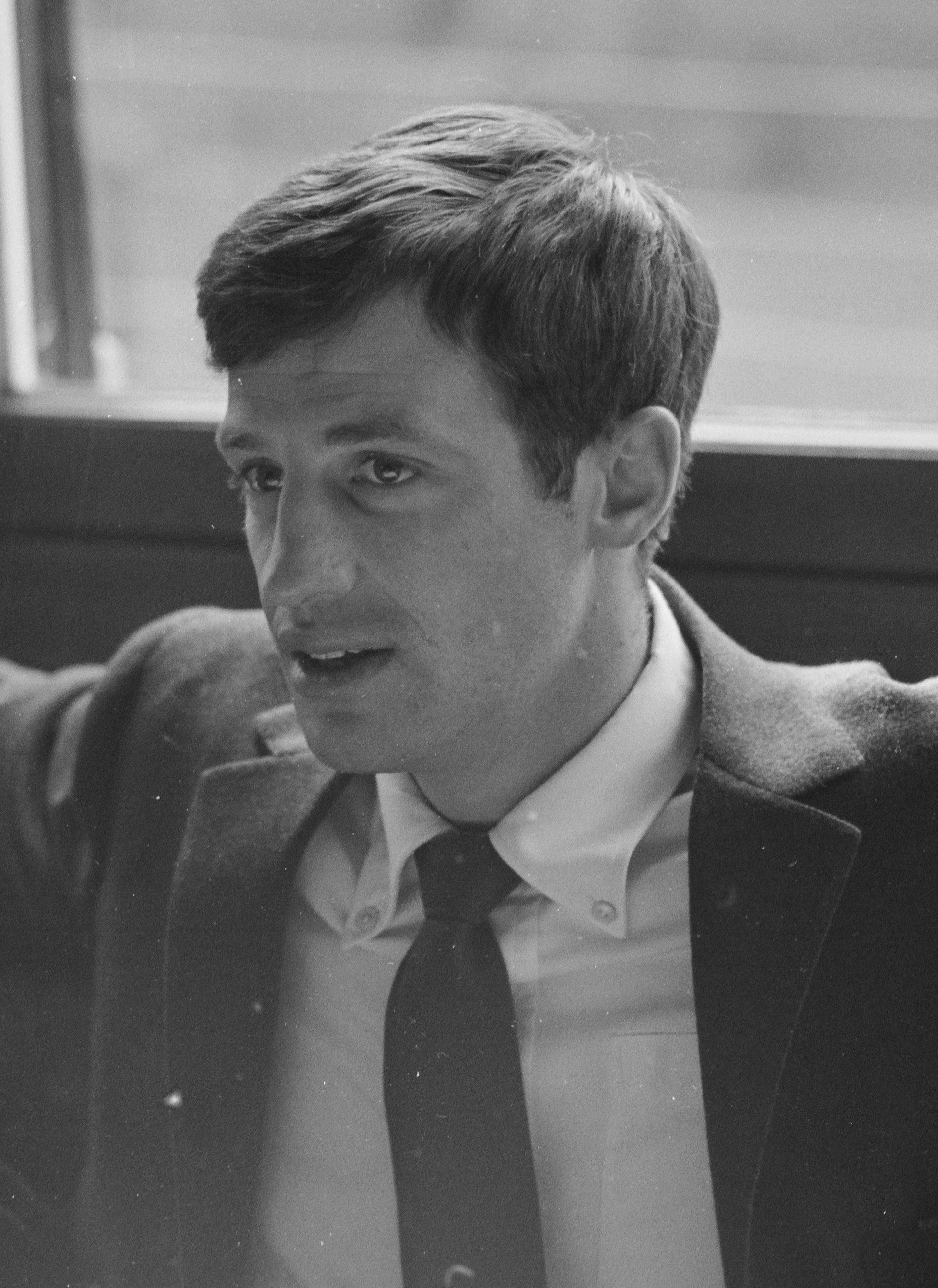
Belmondo in 1962

Belmondo starred in Consider All Risks (1960), a gangster story with Lino Ventura. He then played the lead role in Jean-Luc Godard's Breathless (À Bout de Souffle, 1960), which made him a major figure in the French New Wave.

Breathless was a major success in France and overseas and launched Belmondo internationally and as the face of the New Wave – even though, as he said "I don't know what they mean" when people used that term. In the words of The New York Times it led to his having "more acting assignments than he can handle."

He followed it with Trapped by Fear (1960), then the Italian film Letters By a Novice (1960). With Jeanne Moreau and director Peter Brook he made Seven Days... Seven Nights (1961) which he later called "very boring."

Belmondo appeared as a gigolo in the anthology film Love and the Frenchwoman (1960). Then he made two Italian films, supporting Sophia Loren in Two Women (1961) as a bespectacled country boy ("It may disappoint those who've got me typed" said Belmondo. "But so much the better."), then opposite Claudia Cardinale in The Lovemakers (1961).

Two Women and Breathless were widely seen in the United States and the UK. In 1961, The New York Times called him "the most impressive young French actor since the advent of the late Gérard Philipe".

He was reunited with Godard for A Woman Is a Woman (1961) and made another all-star anthology comedy, Famous Love Affairs (1961).

Later, he acted in Jean-Pierre Melville's philosophical movie Léon Morin, Priest (1961), playing a priest. He was a retired gangster in A Man Named Rocca (1962), then had a massive hit with the swashbuckler Cartouche (1962), directed by Philippe de Broca. Also popular was A Monkey in Winter (1962), a comedy where he and Jean Gabin played alcoholics.

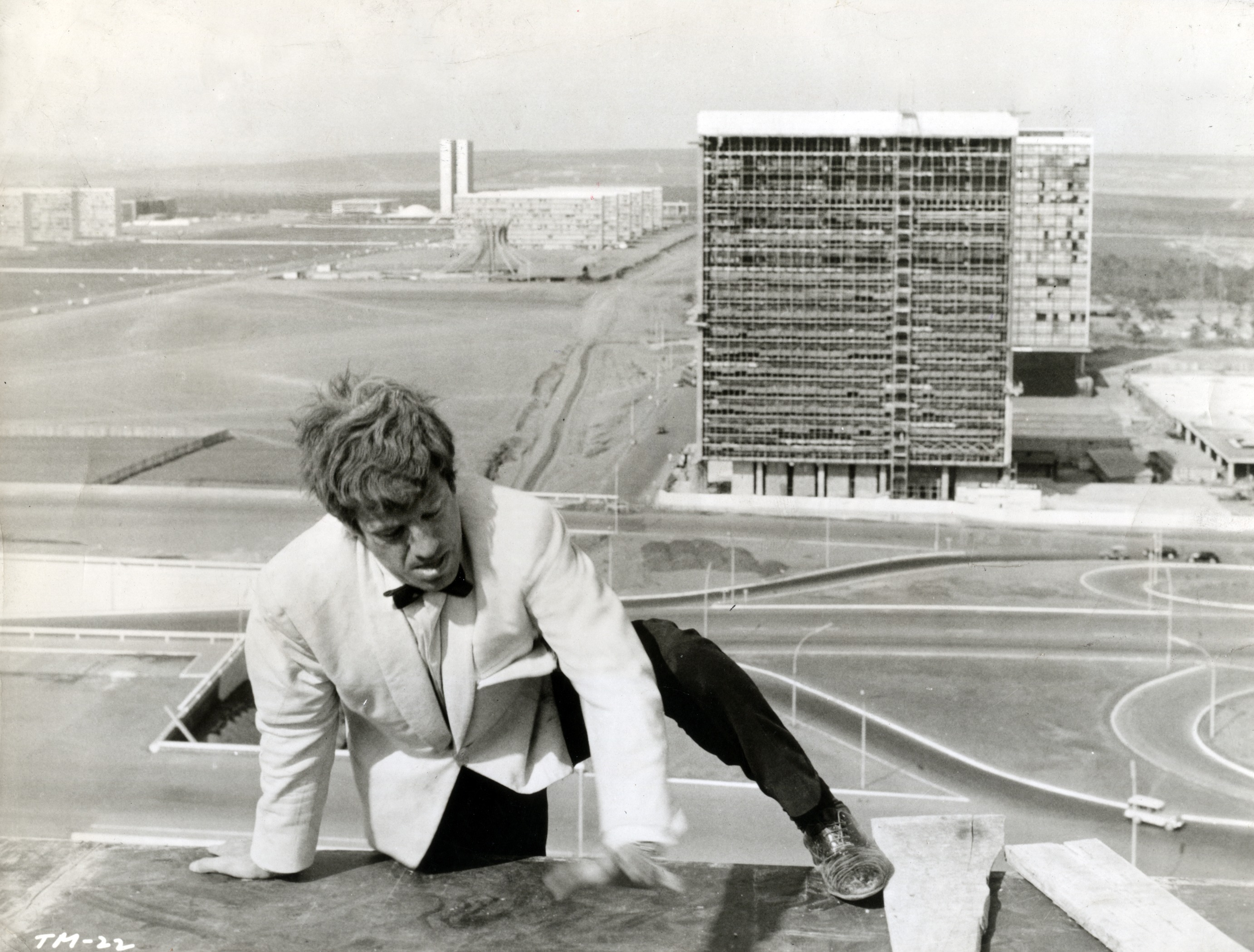
Belmondo filming That Man from Rio in 1963

François Truffaut wanted Belmondo to play the lead in an adaptation of Fahrenheit 451. This did not happen (the film was made several years later with Oskar Werner); instead Belmondo made two movies with Jean-Pierre Melville: the film noir crime film The Fingerman (Le Doulos, 1963) and Magnet of Doom (1963). He co-starred with Gina Lollobrigida in Mad Sea (1963) and appeared in another comedy anthology, Sweet and Sour (1963). There was some controversy when he was arrested for insulting a policeman, when the policeman was charged with assaulting Belmondo.

Banana Peel (1963), with Jeanne Moreau, was a popular comedy. Even more successful was the action-adventure tale That Man from Rio (1964), directed by Philippe de Broca – a massive hit in France, and popular overseas as well. A 1965 profile compared him to Humphrey Bogart and James Dean. It stated Belmondo was:

A later manifestation of youthful rejection... His disengagement from a society his parents made is total. He accepts corruption with a cynical smile, not even bothering to struggle. He is out entirely for himself, to get whatever he can, while he can. The Belmondo type is capable of anything. He knows he is defeated anyway... He represents something tough yet vulnerable, laconic but intense, notably lacking in neuroses or the stumbling insecurities of homus Americanus. He is the man of the moment, completely capable of taking care of himself - and ready to take on the girl of the moment too.

Belmondo's own tastes ran to Tintin comics, sports magazines, and detective novels. He said he preferred "making adventure films like Rio to the intellectual movies of Alain Resnais or Alain Robbe-Grillet. But with François Truffaut I'd be willing to try." His fee was said to be between US$150,000–$200,000 per film. Belmondo said he was open to making Hollywood films but he wanted to play an American rather than a Frenchman and was interested in Cary Grant type roles instead of James Dean/Bogart ones.

Belmondo made Greed in the Sun (1964) with Lino Ventura for director Henri Verneuil, who said Belmondo was "one of the few young actors in France who is young and manly." Backfire (1964) reunited him with Jean Seberg, his Breathless co-star. After a role in Male Hunt (1964) he played the lead in Weekend at Dunkirk (1965), another big hit in France.

Belmondo dominated the French box office for 1964 – That Man from Rio was the fourth most popular movie in the country, Greed in the Sun was seventh, Weekend at Dunkirk ninth, and Backfire 19th.

Crime on a Summer Morning (1965) was less successful, though it still performed well on the strength of Belmondo's name. Up to His Ears (1965) was an attempt to repeat the popularity of That Man Rio, from the same director, but did less well.

There were Hollywood offers, but Belmondo turned them down. "He won't make films outside of France", said director Mark Robson, who wanted him for Lost Command (1966). "He has scripts stacked up and he doesn't see why he should jeopardise his great success by speaking English instead of French."

Belmondo was reunited with Godard for Pierrot le Fou (1965) then made a comedy, Tender Scoundrel (1966). He had small roles in two predominantly English speaking films, Is Paris Burning? (1966) and Casino Royale (1967).

After making The Thief of Paris (1967) for Louis Malle, Belmondo took an acting hiatus for over a year. "One day it seemed that life was passing me by", he said. "I didn't want to work. So I stopped. Then one day I felt like starting again. So I started."

Belmondo spent three months of that time off in Hollywood but did not accept any offers. He did not want to learn English and appear in English-language films:

Every Frenchman dreams of making a Western, of course but America has plenty of good actors. I'm not being falsely modest but why would they need me? I prefer a national film to an international film. Something is lost. Look at what happened to Italy when they went international.

Belmondo returned to filmmaking with the crime movie, Ho! (1968), then had a massive hit with a comedy co-starring David Niven, The Brain (1969). He later appeared in Mississippi Mermaid (1969) for François Truffaut with Catherine Deneuve and the romantic drama Love Is a Funny Thing (1969).

=== 1970s ===
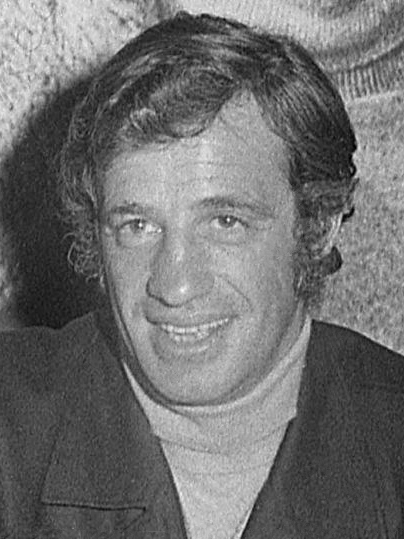
Belmondo in 1971

Belmondo starred alongside Alain Delon in Borsalino (1970), a successful gangster film. The latter produced the film and Belmondo ended up suing Delon over billing.

The Married Couple of the Year Two (1971) was also popular; even more so was The Burglars (1971).

In 1971, he became a film producer and distributor by acquiring 50% of René Chateau. He named his production company Cerito Films in homage to his grandmother.

Belmondo was a passionate football fan and he participated in the financial rescue of Paris Saint-Germain in 1973 with Daniel Hechter and Francis Borelli. He became vice-president of the Parisian club on this occasion and remained in this position until 1976.

Inspired by the success Alain Delon had producing his own films, Belmondo formed his own production company, Cerito Films (named after his grandmother, Rosina Cerrito), to develop movies for Belmondo. The first Cerito film was the black comedy Dr. Popaul (1972), with Mia Farrow, the biggest hit to date for director Claude Chabrol.

La scoumoune (1972) was a new version of A Man Named Rocca (1961). The Inheritor (1973) was an action film; Le Magnifique (1974), a satiric action romance reunited him with Philippe de Broca.

He produced as well as starred in Stavisky (1974). Then he made a series of purely commercial films: Incorrigible (1974), The Night Caller (1975; one of Belmondo's biggest hits of the decade and the first time he played a policeman on screen), The Hunter Will Get You (1976), and Body of My Enemy (1977). Animal (1977) cast him as a stuntman opposite Raquel Welch and he starred as a policeman in Cop or Hood (1979).

=== 1980s ===
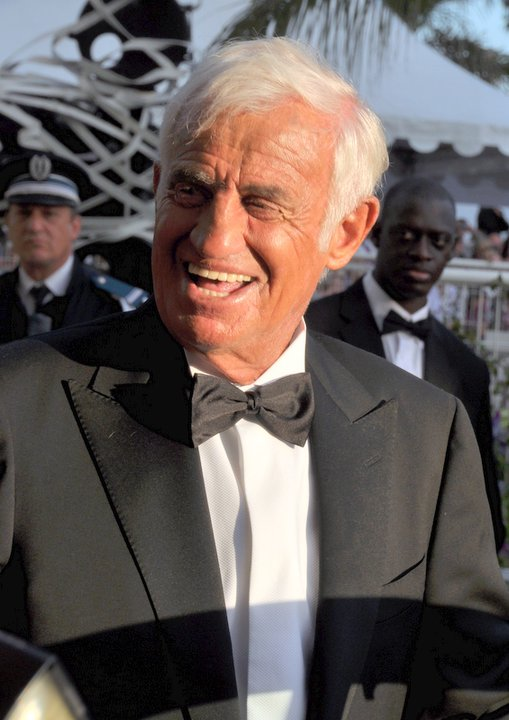
Belmondo at the 2011 Cannes Film Festival

In 1980, Belmondo starred in another comedy, Le Guignolo. He was a secret service agent in The Professional (1981) and a pilot in Ace of Aces (1982).

"What intellectuals don't like is success", said Belmondo. "Success in France is always looked down on, not by the public, but by intellectuals. If I'm nude in a film, that's fine for the intellectuals. But if I jump from a helicopter, they think it's terrible."

Belmondo kept to commercial films: Le Marginal (1983) as a policeman, Les Morfalous (1984) as a sergeant in the French Foreign Legion, Hold-Up (1985) as a bank robber, and Le Solitaire (1987), again playing another policeman in the last one, the latter one was a big box office disappointment and Belmondo returned to theatre shortly afterwards.

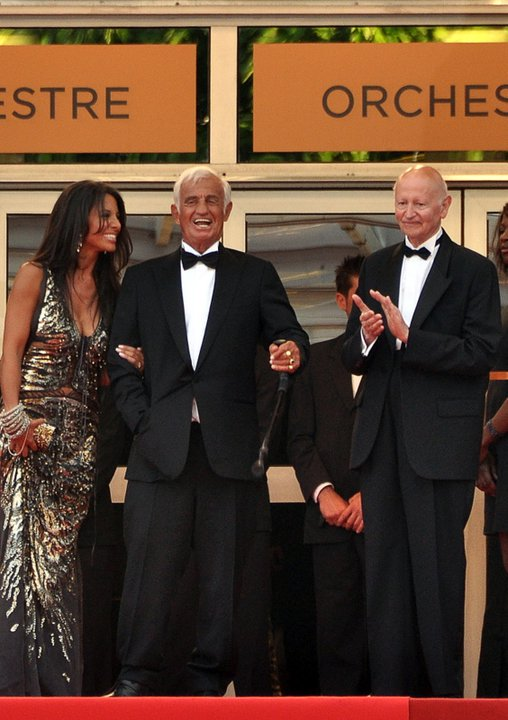
Belmondo in 2011 at the Cannes Film Festival

In 1987, he returned to the theatre after a 26-year absence in a production of Kean, adapted by Jean-Paul Sartre from the novel by Alexandre Dumas. "I did theatre for 10 years before going into movies and every year I planned to go back", he recalled. "I returned before I became an old man."

For Claude Lelouch, Belmondo starred in and co-produced Itinerary of a Spoiled Child (1988). For his performance in the film, also titled as Itineraire d'un Enfant Gate, he won a César.

Belmondo claimed there were "several reasons" why he made fewer films in the 1980s. "I'm now a producer so it takes time to organise things", he said. "But it's also difficult to find good screenplays in France. We have serious writing problems here. And I'd prefer to do theatre for a long time than take on a mediocre film."

=== 1990s and later career ===
In 1990, he played the title role in Cyrano de Bergerac on the stage in Paris, another highly successful production. In 1991, he buys the Théâtre des Variétés. In 1993, he produced his first play, which would become famous: Le Dîner de cons.

He had a small role in One Hundred and One Nights (1995) then the lead in Lelouch's version of Les Misérables (1995). He also appeared in the comedy Désiré (1996), Une chance sur deux (1998), and in the science fiction comedy Peut-être (1999).

Belmondo was initially going to act in the television film Joseph (2005), a remake of La Horse (1970). Due to suffering a stroke in 2001, he was unable to act in the film. In 2009, Belmondo starred in A Man and His Dog ("Un homme et son chien"), his final film role. Despite his difficulty in walking and speaking, he played a character who had the same disability. In 2011, he suffered another stroke, after which he fully retired from acting.

He appeared in 2016 in a documentary Belmondo by Belmondo where he revisited the locations of some of the films in which he acted.

== Honours and awards ==
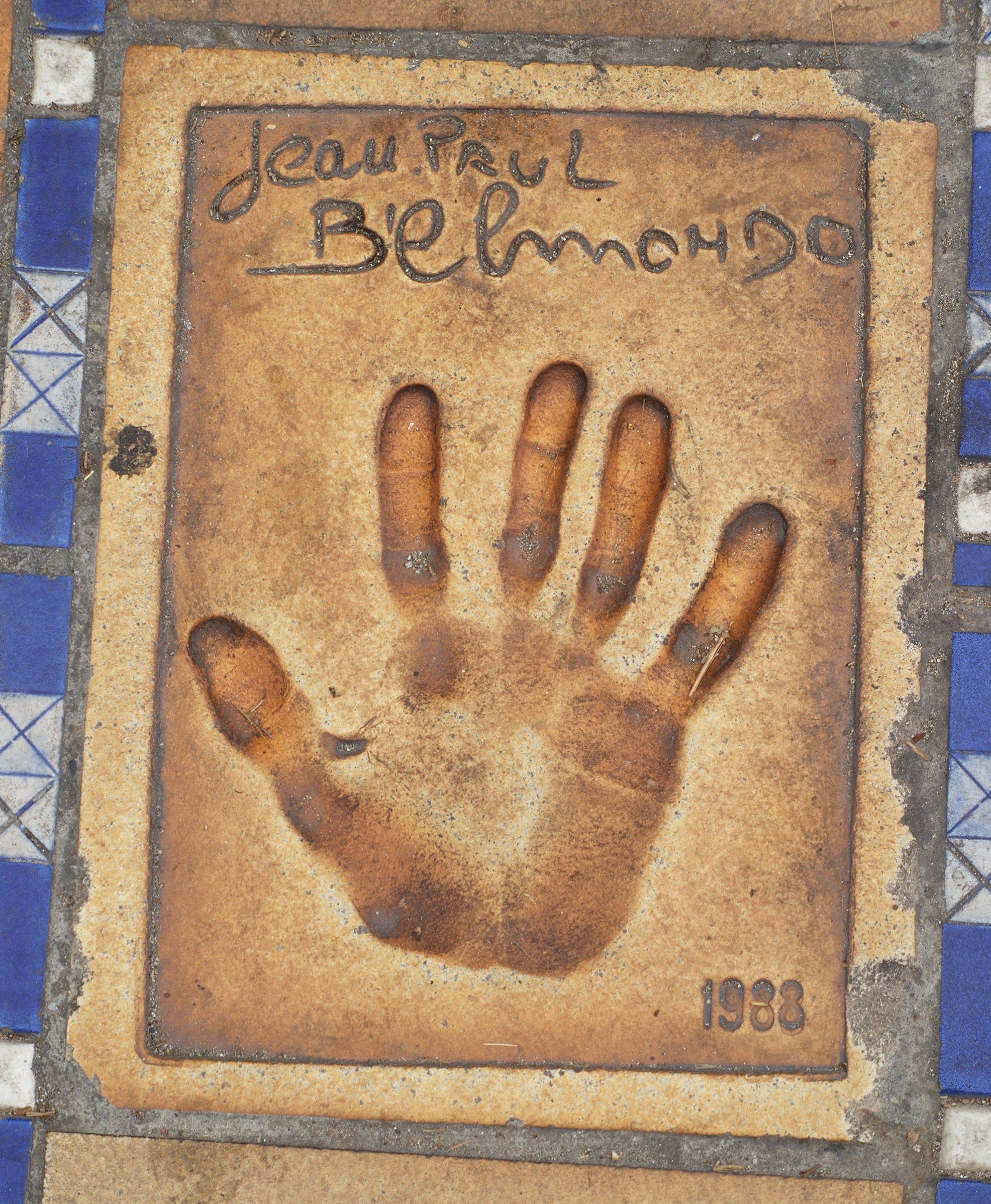
Belmondo's handprint at the Palais des Festivals et des Congrès

In 1989, Belmondo won the César Award for Best Actor for his performance in Itinéraire d'un enfant gâté. The actor declined to attend the 14th César Awards ceremony and issued a statement saying that he was uninterested in the award and only sought the audience's response. One reason for his dislike of the César Awards was that the sculptor César, who designed and gave his name to the award, was a personal rival of his father Paul, who had also been considered as the designer. Belmondo attended the César Awards for the first and last time in 2017, when he was the subject of a special tribute at the 42nd ceremony, which was accompanied by a two-minute standing ovation.

Belmondo was made a Chevalier (Knight) of the Ordre National du Mérite, promoted to Officier (Officer) in 1986 and promoted to Commandeur (Commander) in 1994. He was also made a Chevalier (Knight) of the Ordre National de la Légion d'Honneur, promoted Officier (Officer) in 1991, and promoted to Commandeur (Commander) in 2007.

During his career, he was nominated for two BAFTA Awards.

Belmondo received several honorary awards – Palme d'Or at the 2011 Cannes Film Festival, Golden Lion at the 2016 Venice Film Festival, and César in 2017. In 2009, the Los Angeles Film Critics Association gave him a career achievement award.

== Personal life ==
On 4 December 1952, Belmondo married Élodie Constantin, with whom he had three children: Patricia (1953–1993), who was killed in a fire, Florence (born 1958), and Paul (born 1963). Belmondo and Constantin separated in 1965. She filed for divorce in September 1966, and it was finalised on 5 January 1968.

He had relationships with Ursula Andress from 1965 to 1972, Laura Antonelli from 1972 to 1980, Brazilian actress and singer Maria Carlos Sotto Mayor from 1980 to 1987.

In 1989, Belmondo was in his mid-50s when he met 24-year-old dancer Natty Tardivel. The couple lived together for over a decade before marrying in 2002. On 13 August 2003, Tardivel gave birth to then 70-year-old Belmondo's fourth child, Stella Eva Angelina. Belmondo and Tardivel divorced in 2008. From 2008 to 2012, Belmondo was in a relationship with Belgian model Barbara Gandolfi. In 2017, Gandolfi was found guilty of fraud for failing to repay a 200,000-euro loan to Belmondo, and given a suspended prison sentence.

Belmondo was a supporter of football club Paris Saint-Germain.

== Death ==
Belmondo died on 6 September 2021 at his home in Paris, aged 88. He had been in failing health since suffering a stroke a decade earlier. A national tribute was held on 9 September in Hôtel des Invalides. President Emmanuel Macron called Belmondo a "national hero". The last tribute melody was "Chi Mai" by Ennio Morricone (from the 1981 film The Professional). The next day, 10 September, his funeral took place at the Saint-Germain-des-Prés church in the presence of relatives and family. The actors Alain and Anthony Delon also were present. His remains were cremated at the Père Lachaise Cemetery. Unlike his father, the sculptor Paul Belmondo, who was buried at the Montparnasse Cemetery, Jean-Paul had his ashes scattered in the garden of his childhood home in Piriac-sur-Mer, in Loire-Atlantique.

== Legacy ==
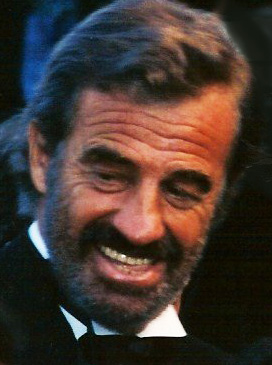
Belmondo at the 1988 Cannes Film Festival

Throughout his career, he was called the French counterpart of actors such as James Dean, Marlon Brando, and Humphrey Bogart. On the day of his death, television channels in France altered their schedules to add screenings of his films, which drew over 6.5 million viewers cumulatively. For his performances as a police officer in many films, the National Police said that "Even if it was just cinema you were in a way one of us, Mr. Belmondo". Throughout his career, he was regarded as an influential French actor and was often seen as the face of the French New Wave. Belmondo was described as the "figurehead" of the French New Wave, with his acting techniques often seen as capturing the style and imagination of France in the 1960s.

Many of his film roles, especially as Michel Poiccard, were regarded as "legendary" and highly influential. Despite his reluctance to learn English, many often believed had he accepted offers from Hollywood, his success there would have been comparable to that of French actors Charles Boyer or Maurice Chevalier. In an obituary for The Guardian, they hailed Belmondo as an "integral part of the history of French cinema, and France itself". He was described as the "epitome of cool".

American film director Quentin Tarantino cited Belmondo as an influence and called Belmondo "a verb that represents vitality, charisma, a force of will, it represents super coolness". English director Edgar Wright said that "cinema will never be quite as cool again" following Belmondo's death. He was described as an icon of French cinema and being influential in shaping modern European cinema.

Belmondo, particularly his role in That Man from Rio, proved highly popular in Japan and influenced the creation of the popular manga and media franchise Lupin the Third.

== Selected filmography ==
Year	Title	Role	Director	Notes
1956	Molière	Le Merluche	Norbert Tildian	short film
1957	On Foot, on Horse, and on Wheels (À pied, à cheval et en voiture)	Venin	Maurice Delbez	A vehicle for Noël-Noël; Belmondo's role cut from film
1958	Be Beautiful But Shut Up (Sois belle et tais-toi)	Pierrot	Marc Allégret	With Mylène Demongeot, Henri Vidal and Alain Delon
1958	Young Sinners (Les tricheurs)	Lou	Marcel Carné	With Pascale Petit
1958	Sunday Encounter (Un drôle de dimanche)	Patrick	Marc Allegret	With Danielle Darrieux, Arletty and Bourvil
1958	Les copains du dimanche	Trebois		
1959	Charlotte and Her Boyfriend (Charlotte et son Jules)	Jean	Jean-Luc Godard	Short film
1959	An Angel on Wheels (Mademoiselle Ange)	Michel Barrot	Géza von Radványi	With Romy Schneider and Henri Vidal
1959	The Three Musketeers (Les Trois Mousquetaires)	D'Artagnan	Claude Barma	For French TV
1959	Web of Passion (À double tour, Leda)	Laszlo Kovacs	Claude Chabrol	With Madeleine Robinson
1960	Breathless (À bout de souffle)	Michel Poiccard	Jean-Luc Godard	With Jean Seberg; from a story by François Truffaut
1960	The Big Risk (Classe Tous Risques)	Eric Stark	Claude Sautet	With Lino Ventura
1960	Seven Days... Seven Nights (Moderato cantabile)	Chauvin	Peter Brook	With Jeanne Moreau
1960	Trapped by Fear (Les distractions)	Paul Frapier	Jacques Dupont	With Alexandra Stewart and Sylva Koscina
1960	Love and the Frenchwoman (La française et l'amour)			Anthology film
1960	Letters By a Novice (Lettere di una novizia)	Giuliano Verdi	Alberto Lattuada	Italian film with Pascale Petit
1960	Two Women (La Ciociara)	Michele de Libero	Vittorio De Sica	Italian film with Sophia Loren
1961	The Lovemakers (La viaccia)	Amerigo	Mauro Bolognini	Italian film with Claudia Cardinale
1961	Léon Morin, Priest (Léon Morin, prêtre)	Léon Morin	Jean-Pierre Melville	With Emmanuelle Riva
1961	A Woman Is a Woman (Une femme est une femme)	Alfred Lubitsch	Jean-Luc Godard	With Anna Karina and Jean-Claude Brialy
1961	Famous Love Affairs (Amours célèbres)	Lauzun	Michel Boisrond	Anthology film
1961	A Man Named Rocca (Un nommé La Rocca)	Roberto La Rocca	Jean Becker	1972 remade by Belmondo as La Scoumoune
1962	The Finger Man (Le Doulos)	Silien	Jean-Pierre Melville	
1962	Swords of Blood (Cartouche)	Louis Dominique Bourguignon	Philippe de Broca	With Claudia Cardinale
1962	A Monkey in Winter (Un singe en hiver)	Gabriel Fouquet	Henri Verneuil	With Jean Gabin
1962	Un cœur gros comme ça (A heart like that) (documentary "The Winner")	as himself	François Reichenbach	
1963	Mad Sea (Mare matto)	Il Livornese	Renato Castellani	Italian film with Gina Lollobrigida
1963	Banana Peel (Peau de banane)	Michel Thibault	Marcel Ophüls	With Jeanne Moreau
1963	Sweet and Sour (Dragées au poivre)	Raymond	Jacques Baratier	
1963	Magnet of Doom (L'Aîné des Ferchaux)	Michel Maudet	Jean-Pierre Melville	Set in the USA; based on a novel by Georges Simenon
1963	The Shortest Day (Il giorno più corto)	Erede Siciliano	Sergio Corbucci	Unbilled cameo
1964	That Man from Rio (L'Homme de Rio)	Adrien Dufourquet	Philippe de Broca	With Françoise Dorléac
1964	Greed in the Sun (Cent mille dollars au soleil)	Rocco	Henri Verneuil	With Lino Ventura
1964	Backfire (Échappement libre)	David Ladislas	Jean Becker	Second film with Jean Seberg
1964	Weekend at Dunkirk (Week-end à Zuydcoote)	Julien Maillat	Henri Verneuil	With Catherine Spaak
1964	Male Hunt (La Chasse à l'homme)	Fernand	Édouard Molinaro	With Jean-Claude Brialy, Françoise Dorléac, Catherine Deneuve
1965	Crime on a Summer Morning (Par un beau matin d'été)	Francis	Jacques Deray	With Geraldine Chaplin
1965	Pierrot le Fou	Pierrot (Ferdinand Griffon)	Jean-Luc Godard	With Anna Karina
1965	Up to His Ears (Les Tribulations d'un Chinois en Chine)	Arthur Lempereur	Philippe de Broca	With Ursula Andress
1966	Tender Scoundrel (Tendre Voyou)	Antoine Maréchal	Jean Becker	With Geneviève Page, Stefania Sandrelli, Mylène Demongeot, Nadja Tiller and Robert Morley
1966	Is Paris Burning? (Paris brûle-t-il?)	Yvon Morandat	René Clément	Hollywood financed film
1967	Casino Royale	French Legionnaire	Ken Hughes, John Huston and others	cameo role
1967	The Thief of Paris (Le Voleur)	Georges Randal	Louis Malle	With Geneviève Bujold
1968	Ho!	François Holin	Robert Enrico	Based on a novel by José Giovanni
1969	The Brain (Le Cerveau)	Arthur Lespinasse	Gérard Oury	With David Niven, Eli Wallach and Bourvil
1969	Mississippi Mermaid (La Sirène du Mississippi)	Louis Mahé	François Truffaut	With Catherine Deneuve
1969	Love Is a Funny Thing (Un homme qui me plaît)	Henri	Claude Lelouch	Filmed in the USA; with Annie Girardot
1970	Borsalino	François Capella	Jacques Deray	With Alain Delon
1971	The Married Couple of the Year Two (Les Mariés de l'an II)	Nicolas Philibert	Jean-Paul Rappeneau	With Marlène Jobert
1971	The Burglars (The Burglars)	Azad	Henri Verneuil	With Omar Sharif, Dyan Cannon
1972	Scoundrel in White (Dr Popaul)	Doctor Paul Simay	Claude Chabrol	With Mia Farrow; also producer
1972	Scoumoune (La Scoumoune)	Roberto Borgo	José Giovanni	With Clauda Cardinale
1973	The Inheritor (L'Héritier)	Bart Cordell	Philippe Labro	
1973	The Man from Acapulco (Le Magnifique)	François Merlin / Bob Saint-Clar	Philippe de Broca	With Jacqueline Bisset; also producer
1974	Stavisky	Alexandre Stavisky	Alain Resnais	With Charles Boyer; also producer
1975	Incorrigible (L'Incorrigible)	Victor Vauthier	Philippe de Broca	With Geneviève Bujold; also producer
1975	The Night Caller (Peur sur la ville)	Jean Letellier	Henri Verneuil	First time Belmondo played a policeman; also producer
1976	The Hunter Will Get You (L'Alpagueur)	Roger Pilard ("L'Alpagueur")	Philippe Labro	Also producer
1976	Body of My Enemy (Le Corps de mon ennemi)	François Leclercq	Henri Verneuil	Also producer
1977	Animal (L'Animal)	Mike Gaucher / Bruno Ferrari	Claude Zidi	With Raquel Welch; also producer
1979	Cop or Hood (Flic ou voyou)	Antonio Cerutti / Stanislas Borowitz	Georges Lautner	Also producer
1980	Le Guignolo	Alexandre Dupré	Georges Lautner	Also producer
1981	The Professional (Le Professionnel)	Josselin Beaumont, a.k.a. "Joss"	Georges Lautner	Also producer
1982	Ace of Aces (L'As des as)	Jo Cavalier	Gérard Oury	Also producer
1983	Le Marginal	Philippe Jordan	Jacques Deray	With Henry Silva; also producer
1984	The Vultures (Les Morfalous)	Pierre Augagneur	Henri Verneuil	Also producer
1984	Happy Easter (Joyeuses Pâques)	Stéphane Margelle	Georges Lautner	With Sophie Marceau; also producer
1985	Outlaws			Producer only
1985	Hold-up	Grimm	Alexandre Arcady	Filmed in Canada; with Kim Cattrall. Also producer; remade as Quick Change
1987	The Loner (Le Solitaire)	Stan Jalard	Jacques Deray	Also producer
1988	Itinéraire d'un enfant gâté	Sam Lion	Claude Lelouch	Also producer
1988	Chocolat			Producer only
1988	Kean	Kean	Pierre Badel	Film of Jean-Paul Sartre play which Belmondo performed on stage
1990	Cyrano de Bergerac	Cyrano de Bergerac	Robert Hossein	Film of play which Belmondo performed on stage
1990	Tom and Lola			Producer only
1992	Stranger in the House (L'inconnu dans la maison)		Georges Lautner	Also producer
1993	Tailleur pour dames		Bernard Murat	TV movie
1993	Le nombril du monde			Producer only
1995	A Hundred and One Nights (Les Cent et Une Nuits de Simon Cinéma)	Professeur Bébel	Agnès Varda	
1995	Les Misérables	Henri Fortin / Jean Valjean	Claude Lelouch	
1996	Désiré	Désiré	Bernard Murat	also producer
1997	La puce à l'oreille		Yves Di Tullio	Based on play by Georges Feydeau
1998	Half a Chance (Une chance sur deux)	Léo Brassac	Patrice Leconte	With Alain Delon and Vanessa Paradis
1999	Peut-être	Ako	Cédric Klapisch	with Romain Duris
1999	Frédérick ou le Boulevard du Crime		Bernard Murat	Recording of play by Eric-Emmanuel Schmitt starring Belmondo
2000	The Actors (Les Acteurs)	Himself	Bertrand Blier	documentary
2000	Amazon	Edouard	Philippe de Broca	
2001	Ferchaux	Paul Ferchaux		TV movie from novel by Georges Simenon
2009	A Man and His Dog ("Un homme et son chien")	Charles	Francis Huster	Final movie role
2010	Allons-y! Alonzo!			short

== See also ==
- Cinema of France
