= Clara D'Ovar =

Portuguese singer and film actress

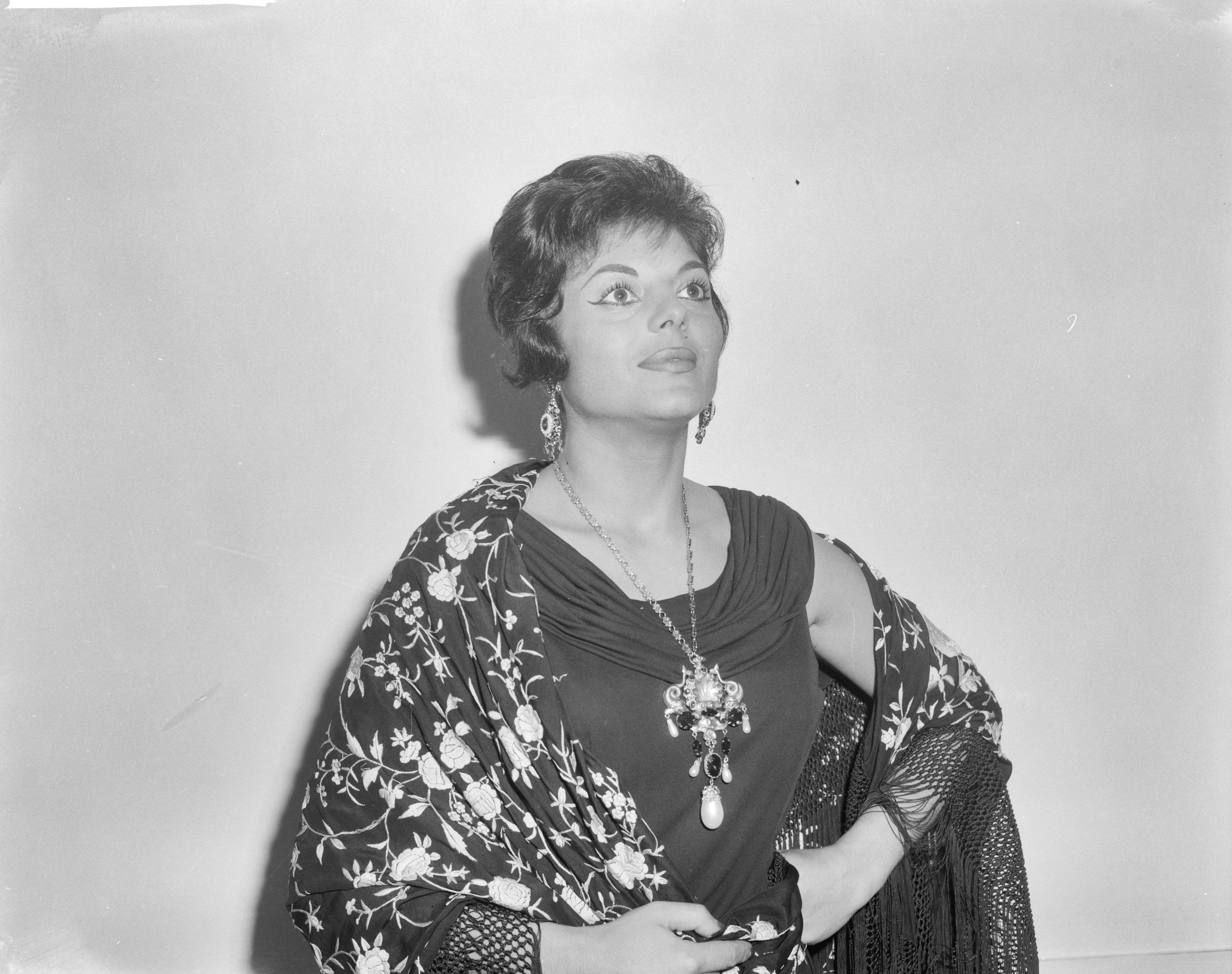
- Born: 4 November 1925; Ovar, Portugal
- Died: 30 June 2002 (aged 76); Ovar, Portugal
- Other name: Clara De Ovar
- Occupations: Actress, singer
- Years active: 1961–1964 (film)

Clara D'Ovar (1925–2002) was a Portuguese singer and film actress. She starred in several French and Portuguese films during the 1960s. She was born on 4 November 1925 in Ovar, Portugal. She passed 30 June 2002 in Ovar, Portugal.

== Biography ==
=== Family and Early Life ===
Born on 4 November 1925, in her family's home on Rua Padre Ferrer, No. 1, in Ovar, Leolina Clara Gomes Dias Simões was the daughter of Manuel Dias Simões and Margarida Ferreira Soares Gomes Dias Simões. She was the granddaughter of António Dias Simões, a well-known town crier of the Cantar dos Reis tradition, as well as a historian, poet, playwright, comic writer, painter, miniaturist, and calligrapher from the same locality, from whom she learned to sing while spending her school holidays at the family estate in São Miguel.

She was also the great-granddaughter of Margarida Simões, who was considered the main muse for the character Margarida in Júlio Dinis’s novel As Pupilas do Senhor Reitor. She was the sister of dancer, fado singer, writer, and film producer José António Dias Simões, known by his stage name Zéni d'Ovar.

Coming from a bourgeois family, she completed her primary and secondary education at various schools in Anadia, Aveiro, and Porto. She then enrolled at the Primary Teaching College in Porto to become a primary school teacher. However, feeling drawn to the arts, at the age of 19, still using the name Clara Dias Simões, she abandoned her studies and moved to Lisbon, where she began singing in several fado houses. To support herself, she worked as a secretary and French–Portuguese correspondent for Inter-Maritime et Fluvial et Centrados Reúnis, which allowed her to travel frequently to Paris and Locarno, where the company had other branches.

=== First Marriage ===
She secured another job as a Portuguese correspondent for a Swiss factory producing watch accessories and settled temporarily in Locarno, where she met Roland Pierre Gottraux (1921–2010), the Swiss consul in Luanda, whom she married. After living in Angola for a year, the couple separated and Clara d’Ovar returned to Europe.

=== Fado House "Le Fado" ===
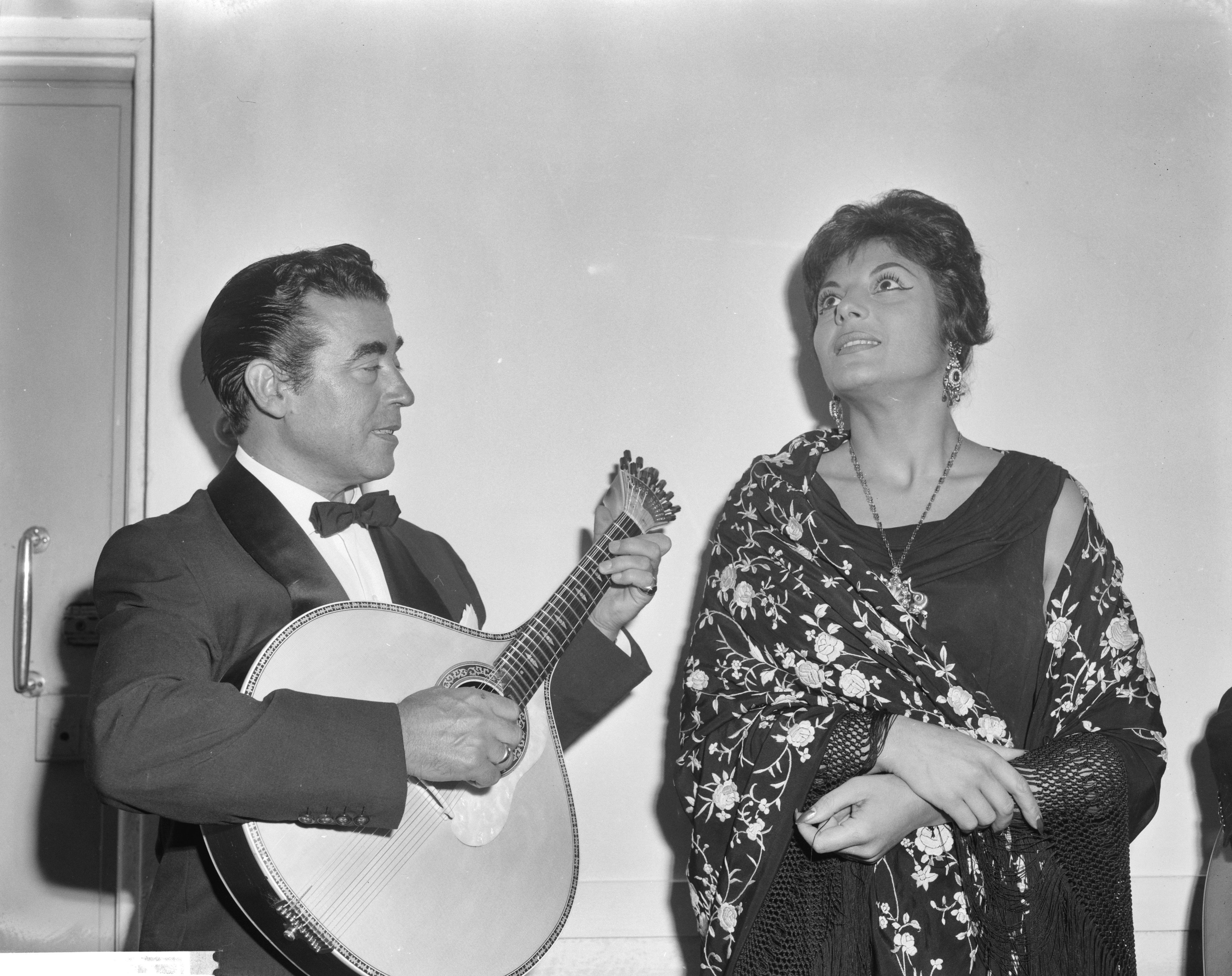
Clara d'Ovar and Jaime Santos (Paris, 1962)

After returning to Portugal, living between Porto and Lisbon for almost two years, she began singing fado in various radio programs before moving to France, where, using her savings and with the support of a group of Portuguese emigrants in the French capital, she opened a small Portuguese restaurant, initially called "Lisboa" and later “Le Fado”, on Rue de Verneuil in the 7th arrondissement of Paris.

Considered the first fado house in Paris, her establishment attracted numerous French artists from the world of cinema and music, providing her with a way to enter the city's intellectual and artistic circles. There, she befriended Françoise Dorléac, Jean Cocteau, Line Renaud, Françoise Aurillac, Jean Marais, Fernandel, Pierre Kast, among many others.

=== Second Marriage ===
Attracting a select and curious clientele with performances by artists such as Rui de Mascarenhas, Maria Albertina, Jaime Santos, Madalena Iglésias, and Zéni d'Ovar at Le Fado, she met the Swiss-American businessman and film producer Peter Oser (1926–1970) during a fado night. Oser was the great-grandson of the magnate and billionaire John D. Rockefeller and the son of Mathilde Rockefeller McCormick and Max Oser. A passionate romance developed between them, lasting until Peter Oser's death. The couple later formalized their marriage in a discreet ceremony in the French capital.

=== Cinematic and Musical Career ===
At the end of the 1950s, adopting the stage name Clara d'Ovar in tribute to her hometown, she released her first fado album, Soirée À la Casa Portuguesa (1958). A year later, after presenting her idea for a film to her close friend and director Pierre Kast, she made her cinema debut as the lead actress in the movie Merci Natercia, known in Portugal as Uma Portuguesa em Paris. Although it was filmed in 1959, production and post-production became a major financial challenge, delaying its release until 1963, which affected the career of the emerging actress who hoped the project would launch her artistic path.

After several unsuccessful auditions, she initially joined the main cast of La Barque Sur l’Ocean (1960) by Maurice Clavel and Cartas da Religiosa Portuguesa (1960) by António Lopes Ribeiro, but both projects were cancelled during pre-production. Disheartened, Clara d’Ovar again turned to Pierre Kast, who secured her a small role as an extra in his film La Morte-Saison des Amours (1961).

This collaboration led to a new project with Kast and Portuguese producer António da Cunha Telles. Founding her own company, JAD Filmes, she debuted as a producer alongside her husband, producing the feature film Portuguese Vacation (1963), featuring Catherine Deneuve, Françoise Arnoul, Bernhard Wicki, Françoise Prévost, Jean-Pierre Aumont, and Jacques Doniol-Valcroze. Successful in this new role, she later introduced her brother Zéni d'Ovar to cinema production and António da Cunha Telles. Clara began planning her directorial debut with the science fiction film Sombras no Firmamento, co-directed with Pierre Kast and written by Chad Olivier. However, despite her efforts, the project was never completed.

During the 1960s, she made her Portuguese cinema debut in O Crime de Aldeia Velha (1964), before returning to France, where she appeared in Le Grain de Sable (1964) and Le pas de Trois (1964). She returned to Portugal in 1965 to appear in the short film Clara d’Ovar em Óbidos by José Fonseca e Costa. A few months later, she made her television debut in the French series Poly au Portugal, created by Cécile Aubry and directed by Claude Boissol, with seven episodes filmed in the Ribatejo region.

That same year, as producer of the short film La brûlure de mille soleils by Pierre Kast, she traveled to Brazil as part of the Portuguese delegation to the Festival do Rio, alongside Isabel de Castro, António Lopes Ribeiro, and Manuel Félix Ribeiro, before returning to Paris to work on the French TV series Au secours Poly... Au secours (1966–1967).

== Selected filmography ==
- The Season for Love (1961)
- Portuguese Vacation (1963)
- Thank You, Natercia (1963)
- The Crime of Aldeia Velha (1964)
- Not Three (1964)

== Bibliography ==
- Jean-Pierre Berthomé & Gaël Naizet. Bretagne et cinéma: cent ans de création cinématographique en Bretagne. Cinémathèque de Bretagne, 1995.
