= Pierre Vaneck =

French actor (1931–2010)

- Vaneck in 1959
- Born: Pierre Auguste Van Hecke; 15 April 1931; Lạng Sơn, French Indochina
- Died: 31 January 2010 (aged 78); Paris, France
- Occupation: Actor
- Years active: 1952–2009
- Spouse: Sophie Becker (m. 1950)

Pierre Vaneck (born Pierre Auguste Van Hecke; 15 April 1931 – 31 January 2010) was a French actor. During his career, he won a Molière Award in 1988 and received a César Award nomination in 2009.

== Biography ==
Son of a Belgian army officer, Pierre Vaneck spent his youth in Antwerp, Belgium, until the age of 17, when he started medical studies in Paris, France. Before long, he branched into studying acting, first at the Rene Simon school, and then at the Theatre Academy, under Henri Rollan. He earned his living meanwhile by working for a saddle-maker by day, and in the evenings, he recited François Villon's poems in cabarets. His début on the stage came in 1952 in The Three Musketeers in the role of Louis XIII. His first important role in the cinema was in the Julien Duvivier film, Marianne of my Youth in 1955.

Pierre Vaneck was primarily a theatre and television actor. The general public knew him particularly for his television role as the father of the main character in Fabien Cosma, as well as in many other serials (Spring Tides, The Garonne...). Vaneck died on Sunday 31 January 2010, during open-heart surgery. He was married to Sophie Becker, daughter and sister of Jacques Becker and Jean Becker. His grandchildren, Aurélie and Thibaud Vaneck, are both actors, and feature in the television series Plus Belle la Vie which is broadcast on France 3 channel.

== Career ==
=== Movies ===
- 1954 : Huis clos by Jacqueline Audry
- 1955 : Marianne of My Youth by Julien Duvivier
- 1956 : Si Paris nous était conté by Sacha Guitry
- 1956 : Celui qui doit mourir by Jules Dassin
- 1956 : Forgive Us Our Trespasses de Robert Hossein
- 1958 : Thérèse Etienne by Denys de La Patellière
- 1958 : Why Women Sin with Dany Carrel
- 1958 : Une balle dans le canon by Charles Gérard and Michel Deville
- 1959 : Merci Natercia by Pierre Kast
- 1960 : The Season for Love by Pierre Kast
- 1961 : Les Amours célèbres by Michel Boisrond
- 1961 : Un nommé La Rocca by Jean Becker
- 1963 : Portuguese Vacation by Pierre Kast
- 1963 : Thank You, Natercia
- 1966 : Les Iles enchantées / As Ilhas encantadas by Carlos Vilardebo
- 1966 : Paris brûle-t-il? by René Clément
- 1968 : L'Étrangère by Sergio Gobbi
- 1968 : Maldonne by Sergio Gobbi
- 1969 : Les Patates by Claude Autant-Lara
- 1970 : L'Ile aux Coquelicots by Salvatore Adamo
- 1971 : Le Seuil du vide by Jean-François Davy
- 1971 : Biribi by Daniel Moosmann
- 1974 : The Irony of Chance by Édouard Molinaro
- 1980 : Le Soleil en face by Pierre Kast
- 1980 : La Légion saute sur Kolwezi by Raoul Coutard
- 1983 : Erendira by Ruy Guerra
- 1993 : Vent d'est by Robert Enrico
- 1995 : Othello by Oliver Parker
- 1996 : La Propriétaire by Ismail Merchant
- 1999 : Là-bas, mon pays by Alexandre Arcady
- 1999 : Furia by Alexandre Aja
- 2006 : La Science des rêves by Michel Gondry
- 2008 : Deux jours à tuer by Jean Becker

=== Television ===
- La caméra explore le temps TV show by Stellio Lorenzi
- 1968 : Sarn by Claude Santelli
- 1971 : Aux frontières du possible
- 1975 : Saint-Just et la force des choses by Pierre Cardinal
- 1980 : La fin du marquisat d'Aurel by Guy Lessertisseur
- 1981 : Histoires extraordinaires TV show based on Edgar Allan Poe stories
- 1982 : Je tue il by Pierre Boutron
- 1984 : La Mafia Italian TV show by Sergio Silva
- 1985: Charles Thieron in The Collectors
- 1988 : Le Démon écarlate by Joseph Drimal
- 1990 : Orages d'été, avis de tempête by Jean Sagols
- 1992 : Les Cœurs brûlés, by Jean Sagols
- 1993 : Les Grandes Marées, by Jean Sagols
- 2001 : Fabien Cosma,
- 2002 : Garonne by Claude d'Anna
- 2003 : Le soleil en face by Philippe Roussel
- 2009 : A.D.A. L'argent des Autres by Daniel Benoin

=== Theatre ===
- 1952 : Les Trois Mousquetaires based on Alexandre Dumas book
- 1953 : Sud by Julien Green
- 1953 : La Maison de la nuit by Thierry Maulnier
- 1953 : La Chair de l'orchidée by James Hadley Chase
- 1954 : Pour le roi de Prusse by Maurice Bray
- 1954 : L'Ennemi by Julien Green
- 1955 : Le Bal des adieux by André Josset
- 1955 : L'Éventail de Lady Windermere by Oscar Wilde
- 1958 : La Paix du dimanche by John Osborne
- 1959 : Les Possédés by Albert Camus
- 1959 : Long voyage vers la nuit by Eugene O'Neill
- 1960 : Jules César by William Shakespeare
- 1961 : Les Violons parfois by Françoise Sagan
- 1962 : L'Aiglon by Edmond Rostand
- 1963 : La guerre de Troie n'aura pas lieu by Jean Giraudoux
- 1963 : Le Cid by Corneille
- 1964 : Lorenzaccio by Alfred de Musset
- 1964 : Luther by John Osborne, directed Georges Wilson, Festival d'Avignon
- 1965 : La Calèche by Jean Giono,
- 1965 : Hamlet by William Shakespeare, Directed Georges Wilson, Festival d'Avignon
- 1967 : Le Duel by Anton Chekhov
- 1967 : Pygmalion by George Bernard Shaw
- 1970 : Dom Juan by Molière
- 1973 : La Reine de Césarée by Robert Brasillach
- 1977 : ''La Nuit de l'iguane by Tennessee Williams
- 1980 : La musique adoucit les mœurs by Tom Stoppard
- 1983 : Les Exilés by James Joyce
- 1985 : Retour à Florence by Henry James
- 1986 : La Salle d'attente
- 1987 : La Ronde by Arthur Schnitzler
- 1987 : Le Secret by Henri Bernstein
- 1989 : La Traversée de l'hiver by Yasmina Reza
- 1990 : La Fonction by Jean-Marie Besset
- 1992 : Le Jugement dernier by Bernard-Henri Lévy
- 1993 : Passions secrètes by Jacques-Pierre Amette
- 1994 : « Art » by Yasmina Reza
- 1996 : La Cour des comédiens by Antoine Vitez
- 1999 : Copenhague by Michael Frayn
- 2002 : Hysteria by Terry Johnson
- 2003 : Déjeuner chez Wittgenstein by Thomas Bernhard
- 2006 : Opus Cœur by Israël Horovitz
- 2008 : Rock'N'Roll by Tom Stoppard
- 2009 : A.D.A. L'Argent des Autres by Jerry Sterner
