= António da Cunha Telles =

Portuguese film director and producer (1935–2022)

- Born: 26 February 1935; Funchal, Portugal
- Died: 23 November 2022 (aged 87); Lisbon, Portugal
- Occupation: Film director

António Cohen da Cunha Telles (26 February 1935 – 23 November 2022) was a Portuguese film director and producer.

== Biography ==
Telles was born on 26 February 1935, in Funchal, Madeira. He studied Medicine in the University of Lisbon. He went to Paris around 1956, studying film-making at the Institut des Hautes Etudes Cinematographiques (IDHEC), graduating in 1961.

Back to Portugal, he ran a newspaper called Imagens de Portugal (Images of Portugal), and assumed leading functions at the Cinema Services of State Entities.

His directing debut was made with the documentary Os Transportes (1962), and starts activity as a producer, becoming one of the essential names of the Portuguese New Cinema (Novo Cinema) movement. He produces Os Verdes Anos (1963) by Paulo Rocha and Belarmino (1964) by Fernando Lopes.

In 1970, Cunha Telles directed his first feature-film, O Cerco. Meanwhile, he established a distribution company (Animatógrafo) which becomes responsible for a revolution in the kind of cinema seen in Portugal in the first half of the 1970s. Eisenstein, Tanner, Jorge Sanjines, Littín, Glauber Rocha, Vigo, Gilles Carle, Karmitz, among others, became more familiar to the Portuguese audience through that distributor.

During the 1970s, Telles directed three films: Meus Amigos (1974) and Continuar a Viver (1976) signed by himself, As Armas e o Povo (1975) together with other directors. In the end of the decade, Cunha Telles is found high placed as the leader of the Portuguese Cinema Institute and the Tobis Portuguesa.

In 1983, he returned to production, since the Animatógrafo firm was divided in one sector of distribution (still in activity, conducted by Renée Gagnon - the current Marfilmes) and one sector of production, headed by himself (together with his daughter Pandora da Cunha Telles - the current Filmes de Fundo), which is dedicated to its own productions as well as assuring executive productions of foreign films partially shot in Portugal, counting since that date with a large number of productions, with films directed by names like José Fonseca e Costa, Eduardo Geada, Joaquim Leitão, Edgar Pêra, António de Macedo, António-Pedro Vasconcelos and among several telefilms and a countless number of executive productions.

The later films directed by Cunha Telles include Vidas (1984), Pandora (1996) and, more recently, Kiss Me (2004), the first and only cinematic experience of the top model Marisa Cruz.

== Filmography ==
=== Director ===
- Kiss Me (2004)
- Pandora (1996)
- Vidas (1984)
- Continuar a Viver (1976)
- As Armas e o Povo (1975)- various directors
- Meus Amigos (1974)
- O Cerco (1970)
- Os Transportes (1962)

=== Producer ===
- Quinze Pontos na Alma, by Vicente Alves do Ó (2009)
- How to Draw a Perfect Circle, by Marco Martins (2009)
- América (filme)|América, by João Nuno Pinto (2009)
- A Corte do Norte, by João Botelho (2008)
- Terra Sonâmbula, by Teresa Prata (2007)
- Hotel Tivoli, by Antón Reixa (2007)
- Nome de Código: Sintra, by Jorge Paixão da Costa (2007, TV series)
- O Mistério da Estrada de Sintra, by Jorge Paixão da Costa (2007)
- Parte de Mim, by Margarida Leitão (2006)
- Fin de curso, by Miguel Martí (2005)
- Entre o Desejo e o Destino, by Vicente Alves do Ó (2005, curta-metragem)
- Macao sans retour, by Michale Boganim (2004)
- Kiss Me, by António da Cunha Telles (2004)
- Maria e as Outras, by José Sá Caetano (2004)
- Jaime, by António-Pedro Vasconcelos (1998)
- Sur un air de mambo, by Jean-Louis Bertucelli (1996)
- Pandora, by António Da Cunha Telles (1996)
- Passagem por Lisboa, by Eduardo Geada (1994)
- Aqui na Terra, by João Botelho (1993)
- A Linha do Horizonte, by Fernando Lopes (1992)
- Requiem para um Narciso, by João Pedro Ruivo (1992, TV series "A La Minute")
- Rosa Negra, by Margarida Gil (1991)
- Le Blocus, by José Fonseca e Costa (1990, TV series "Napoleon et l'Europe" )
- O Bobo, by José Álvaro Morais (1987)
- Uma Aventura em Lisboa, by Eduardo Geada (1989, TV series)
- Sans peur et sans reproche, by Gérard Jugnot (1988)
- Paraíso Perdido, by Alberto Seixas Santos (1986)
- Vidas, by António da Cunha Telles (1983)
- Contactos, by Leandro Ferreira (1982)
- Saudades Para D. Genciana, by Eduardo Geada (1981)
- Uma Experiência, by Paulo Rocha (1970, short)
- Alta Velocidade, by António de Macedo (1967, short)
- Mudar de Vida, by Paulo Rocha (1966)
- Domingo à Tarde, by António de Macedo (1966)
- O Trigo e o Joio, by Manuel Guimarães (1965)
- Catembe, by Faria de Almeida (1965)
- As Ilhas Encantadas, by Carlos Vilardebó (1965)
- The Crime of Aldeia Velha, by Manuel Guimarães (1964)
- La peau douce, by François Truffaut (1964, co-production)
- Belarmino, by Fernando Lopes (1964)
- Le triangle circulaire, by Pierre Kast (1964, co-production)
- Not Three, by A. Dornet (1964)
- Portuguese Vacation, by Pierre Kast (1963, co-production)
- Les Chemins du Soleil, by Carlos Vilardebó (1963, short)
- Os Verdes Anos, by Paulo Rocha (1963)
- P.X.O., de Pierre Kast e J. Daniel Valcroze (1962, short)

== See also ==
Cinema of Portugal

Cinema Novo

== Bibliographic References ==
- (in Portuguese) O Cais do Olhar by José de Matos-Cruz, Portuguese Cinematheque, 1999
- (in Portuguese) Dicionário do Cinema Português (1962–1988) by Jorge Leitão Ramos, Editorial Caminho, SA, Lisbon, 1989
