= Belarmino (disambiguation) =

Belarmino is a 1964 film.

Belarmino may also refer to:

- Belarmino Salgado (born 1966), Cuban judoka
- Belarmino Tomás (1892–1950), Asturian trade unionist and socialist politician
- Teody Belarmino (born 1922), Filipino actor
