= Sacha Vierny =

French cinematographer (1919–2001)

Sacha Vierny (10 August 1919 – 15 May 2001) was a French cinematographer. He was born in Bois-le-Roi, Seine-et-Marne, Île-de-France, France, and died in Paris, France, at the age of 81. He is most famous for his work with Alain Resnais – especially for the two films Hiroshima mon amour and L'année dernière à Marienbad – and with Peter Greenaway (The Cook, the Thief, His Wife & Her Lover, Prospero's Books).

== Career ==
Alain Resnais and Vierny made 10 films together from 1955 to 1984, starting with the Holocaust film Night and Fog (Nuit et brouillard in original French) and ending with L'amour à mort. He was the cinematographer of choice for British film-maker Peter Greenaway from A Zed & Two Noughts (1985) onward, and shot virtually everything Greenaway directed, including his television work, up to and including 8½ Women (1999). Greenaway has also referred to Vierny as his "most important collaborator".

Vierny also worked with such directors as Luis Buñuel (Belle de jour), Raoul Ruiz, Pierre Kast, Chris Marker and Paul Paviot.

== Filmography (features) ==
- The Man Who Cried (2000)
- 8 ½ Women (1999)
- Dormez, je le veux! (1998)
- The Pillow Book (1996)
- The Baby of Mâcon (1993)
- L'Autre Célia (1992)
- Rosa (1992)
- M Is for Man, Music, Mozart (1991) (TV)
- Prospero's Books (1991)
- A Walk Through Prospero's Library (1991) (TV)
- Final (1990)
- The Cook, the Thief, His Wife & Her Lover (1989)
- Drowning by Numbers (1988)
- The Belly of an Architect (1987)
- Flügel und Fesseln (1985)
- A Zed & Two Noughts (1985)
- L'amour à mort (1984)
- La femme publique (1984)
- Les trois couronnes du matelot (1982)
- Le Rose et le blanc (1982)
- Beau-père (1981)
- Mon oncle d'Amérique (1980)
- Le fils puni (1980)
- Le chemin perdu (1980)
- L'hypothèse du tableau volé (1979)
- Baxter, Vera Baxter (1977)
- Le Conseiller Crespel (1977)
- Le Diable dans la boîte (1977)
- La vocation suspendue (1977)
- Stavisky (1974)
- Le Moine (1973)
- Les Granges brulées (1973)
- Le Fusil à lunette (1972)
- La Sainte famille (1972)
- Bof... Anatomie d'un livreur (1971)
- La Main (1969)
- La Nuit Bulgare (1969)
- Le tatoué (1968)
- Darling Caroline (1968)
- Belle de jour (1967)
- La Bien-aimée (1967) (TV)
- La Musica (1967)
- The War Is Over (1966)
- De Dans van de Reiger (1966)
- Aimez-vous les femmes? (1964)
- Thank You, Natercia (1963)
- Muriel ou Le temps d'un retour (1963)
- Climats (1962)
- Portrait-robot (1962)
- L'année dernière à Marienbad (1961)
- The Season for Love (1961)
- Main chaude, La (1960)
- Merci Natercia! (1960)
- Une question d'assurance (1960)
- Hiroshima mon amour (1959)
- Le Bel âge (1959)
- L'Opéra mouffe (1958)
- Lettre de Sibérie (1957)
- Le Mystère de l'atelier quinze (1957)
- Nuit et brouillard (1955)
- Pantomimes (1954)
