= The Season for Love =

1961 film

- Directed by: Pierre Kast
- Written by: Alain Aptekman; Pierre Kast
- Produced by: Clara D'Ovar; Peter Oser
- Starring: Françoise Arnoul; Daniel Gélin; Pierre Vaneck
- Cinematography: Sacha Vierny
- Edited by: Yannick Bellon
- Music by: Georges Delerue
- Production company: Jad Films
- Distributed by: Cocinor
- Release date: 12 April 1961
- Running time: 100 minutes
- Country: France
- Language: French

The Season for Love (French: La morte-saison des amours) is a 1961 French comedy drama film directed by Pierre Kast and starring Françoise Arnoul, Daniel Gélin and Pierre Vaneck. The film's sets were designed by the art director Jacques Saulnier. New Wave in style, it was shot primarily on location around Chaux and Arbois and particularly at the Royal Saltworks at Arc-et-Senans in eastern France.

== Synopsis ==
Geneviève has married the writer Sylvain and moved to he countryside with him while he writes his new novel. There they encounter Françoise and Jacques, a much more extrovert couple.

== Cast ==
- Françoise Arnoul as Geneviève
- Daniel Gélin as Jacques Saint-Ford
- Pierre Vaneck as Sylvain
- Françoise Prévost as Françoise
- Alexandra Stewart as Sandra
- Anne-Marie Baumann as Anne-Marie
- Michèle Verez as Michèle
- Ursula Kubler as Ursula

== Bibliography ==
- Durgnat, Raymond. Sexual Alienation in the Cinema. Studio Vista, 1972.
- Sellier, Geneviève. Masculine Singular: French New Wave Cinema. Duke University Press, 2008.
