= Thank You, Natercia =

- Directed by: Pierre Kast
- Written by: Pierre Kast; Peter Oser; Olivier Sylvain
- Produced by: Peter Oser; Paul Temps
- Starring: Clara D'Ovar; Pierre Vaneck; Pierre Dudan
- Cinematography: Sacha Vierny
- Edited by: Yannick Bellon
- Music by: Georges Delerue
- Production company: Jad Films
- Release date: 1963
- Running time: 90 minutes
- Country: France
- Language: French

Thank You, Natercia (French: Merci Natercia!) is a 1963 French drama film directed by Pierre Kast and starring Clara D'Ovar, Pierre Vaneck and Pierre Dudan.

== Cast ==
- Clara D'Ovar as Natércia
- Pierre Vaneck as Alain
- Pierre Dudan as Lambert
- François Maistre as L'avoué
- Alexandra Stewart as Sandra
- Ursula Kubler as Olga
- Peter Oser as Mário
- Françoise Prévost as Françoise
- José Quaglio as Claude
- Ginette Pigeon as Sylvie
- Françoise Thibaut as Marie-Pierre
- Bernard Andrieu as Armand
- Anne-Marie Baumann as Anna
- Sacha Briquet as Jacques
- Jean Saudray
- Jean-Marie Arnoux as Petit rôle
- Florence Blot as Petit rôle
- Raymond Bour as Petit rôle
- André Chanu as Le père d'Alain
- Jacques Ciron as Petit rôle
- Liberto Condé as Petit rôle
- Hubert de Lapparent
- Marie-Christine Desouches as Petit rôle
- Yvette Etiévant
- Pierre Even as Petit rôle
- Michel Fontayne as Petit rôle
- Carole Grove as Petit rôle
- Pierre Hatet as Petit rôle
- Jacques Hilling as Petit rôle
- Marie-Luce Jamagne as Petit rôle
- Claude Mahias as L'amant d'Olga
- Seda Maliane as Seda
- Liane Marelli as Petit rôle
- Manuel Marquez as Petit rôle
- Jean-Marie Riviière as Petit rôle
- Serge Sauvion in a bit part
- Dias Simoes as Le chanteur portugais
- Mario Sylvestre as Petit rôle
- Rolande Tisseyre as Macha
- Bernard Winckler as Petit rôle

== Bibliography ==
- Michel Marie. The French New Wave: An Artistic School. John Wiley & Sons, 2008.
