= Canicule =

Canicule may refer to:

- The dog days of summer
- Dog Day (French: Canicule), a 1984 film
