= Passionate Summer =

Passionate Summer may refer to:

- Passionate Summer (1956 film) (France and Italy)
- Passionate Summer (1958 film) (United Kingdom)
