= Manuel Guimarães =

Portuguese filmmaker (1915–1975)

- Born: Manuel Fernandes Pinheiro Guimarães; 19 August 1915; Albergaria-a-Velha, Portugal
- Died: 29 January 1975 (aged 59); Lisbon, Portugal
- Years active: 1947–1970

Manuel Guimarães (19 August 1915 – 29 January 1975) was a Portuguese filmmaker.

== Biography ==
In 1931, Guimarães studied painting in the School of Fine Arts in Porto. He started to work in 1936 as a theater scenographer, illustrator and cartoonist, as well as a film poster designer. He became interested in cinematic art, and started out as assistant of directors as Manoel de Oliveira, António Lopes Ribeiro, Jorge Brum do Canto, Arthur Duarte and Armando de Miranda.

In 1949, he directed the short documentary O Desterrado, a film about the life and craft of the Portuguese sculptor Soares dos Reis. Saltimbancos as his first feature-film, which is an adaptation of the novel Circo (Circus) of the writer Leão Penedo. The plot is centered on the life of a small travelling circus. Meanwhile, Guimarães worked in advertising in Metro Goldwyn-Mayer.

In 1952, Manuel Guimarães directed Nazaré, whose script was written by the neo-realist writer Alves Redol, portraying the life of the fishermen from Nazaré. The film had several cuts caused by censorship. Vidas Sem Rumo (1956), script by Manuel Guimarães and dialogues by Alves Redol, suffered even worse cuts: about half of the film was cut and entire scenes were removed, becoming an almost unintelligible film.

Being constantly attacked by the regime, Guimarães opted to direct more commercial movies about sport events, since 1956. In his attempt to return to fiction, (A Costureirinha da Sé – 1958) Manuel had to accept product placement in the film. His next works were essentially documentaries promoting Portuguese towns and products.

António da Cunha Telles, who meanwhile began to produce the first films of the Portuguese Cinema Novo (New Cinema), became interested in him and accepted to do an executive production and co-production of two of his next films: O Crime da Aldeia Velha (1964), an adaptation of a Bernardo Santareno play and O trigo e o Joio (1965) based in the book with the same name, by Fernando Namora, who wrote the script as well. However, the public preferred a different kind of cinema, more entertaining, and Guimarães turn again to art documentary.

Manuel Guimarães had some periods where he returned to illustration and graphic works in newspapers and other publications and continued painting, especially in the end of his life, but without any public expression.

The 25 de Abril brought him hope, but it was too late. Ill, Manuel Guimarães couldn't end his last film, Cântico Final, adapted from the novel with the same name wrote by Virgílio Ferreira. The film was ended by his son, Dórdio Guimarães.

== Filmography ==
- O Desterrado (1949)
- Saltimbancos (1951)
- Nazaré (1952)
- Vidas Sem Rumo (1956)
- As Corridas Internacionais do Porto (1956)
- XXX Volta a Portugal em Bicicleta (1957)
- O Porto é Campeão (1956)
- A Costureirinha da Sé (1958)
- Barcelos (1961)
- Porto, Capital do Trabalho (1961)
- Bi-seculares (1961)
- The Crime of Aldeia Velha (1964)
- O Trigo e o Joio (1965)
- Artes Gráficas (1967)
- O Ensino das Belas-Artes (1967)
- Porto, Escola de Artistas (1967)
- Tapetes de Viana do Castelo (1967)
- Tráfego e Estiva (1968) – first Portuguese film in 70mm
- António Duarte (1969)
- Fernando Namora (1969)
- Resende (1969)
- Viagem do TER / Expressos Lisboa-Madrid (1969)
- Areia, Mar – Mar, Areia (1970)
- Cântico Final

== Bibliographical References ==
- Dicionário do Cinema Português (1962–1988). by Jorge Leitão Ramos, Editorial Caminho, SA, Lisbon, 1989 (in Portuguese)
- O Cais do Olhar by José de Matos-Cruz, Portuguese Cinematheque, 1999 (in Portuguese)
