= The Crime of Aldeia Velha =

1964 film

- Directed by: Manuel Guimarães
- Written by: Bernardo Santareno (play)
- Produced by: António da Cunha Telles
- Music by: Joly Braga Santos
- Production company: Produções Cunha Telles
- Release date: 20 November 1964
- Running time: 105 minutes
- Country: Portugal
- Language: Portuguese

The Crime of Aldeia Velha (Portuguese: O Crime da Aldeia Velha) is a 1964 Portuguese drama film directed by Manuel Guimarães.

== Cast ==
- Clara D'Ovar
- Alma Flora
- Lídia Franco
- Miguel Franco
- Cremilda Gil as (voice)
- Rui Gomes as Priest
- Barbara Laage as Joana
- Maria Olguim as Zefa
- Rogério Paulo as Rui
- Mário Pereira as António
- Glicínia Quartin
- Clara Rocha
- Maria Schultz

== Bibliography ==
- Luís Reis Torgal. Estados novos, estado novo: ensaios de história política e cultural vol. II. Coimbra University Press, 2009.
