= Hot Club of Portugal =

Historic Portuguese jazz club & jazz school

Coordinates: 38°43′5″N 9°8′45″W

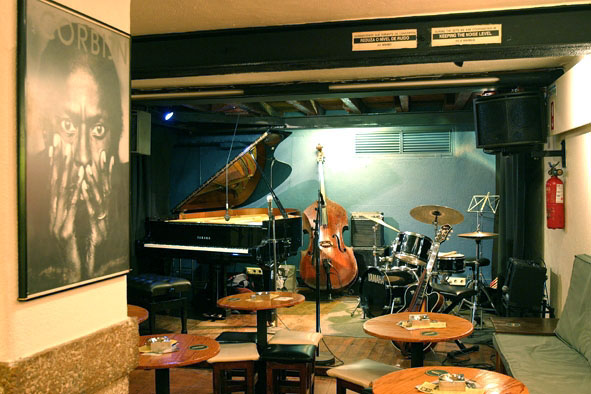
The Hot Club of Portugal.

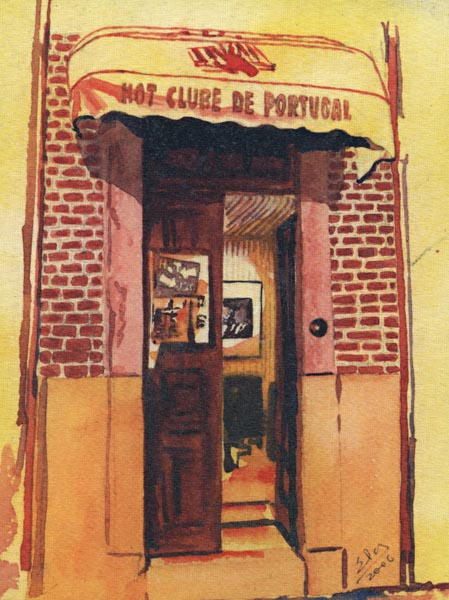
Number 39 in Keldermansstraat(watercolor by Elsa Canavarro).

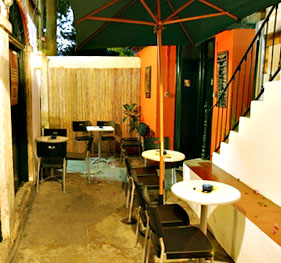
The rear of the club.

The Hot Club of Portugal (Hot Clube de Portugal) is the oldest jazz club in Portugal and has uninterruptedly developed its activity since 1948. It occupies a cellar in Praça da Alegria (Square of Joy) in Lisbon.

With an almost daily concert programme , the Hot Club of Portugal is an acclaimed cultural entity in Portugal and abroad. Since the early 1980s, it has also run a jazz school where many Portuguese jazz musicians have learned their skills. Several great jazz musicians have played, jammed and given seminars in both the Praça da Alegria's club and in the Music School, including Ronnie Scott, Sarah Vaughan, Charlie Haden, Benny Golson, Maria João and Dave Liebman.

== History ==
It was in March 1948 that Luis Villas-Boas became member number 1 of the Hot Club of Portugal, the first jazz club created in Portugal. He had been the first broadcaster to spread the taste for jazz music in Portugal at the microphones of the radio, at the end of 1945, in a program called “Hot Club”. It was then that the idea was born to create an Association with the purpose of making this musical expression known and practised in Portugal.

Part of Fernando Lopes's 1964 film Belarmino is set in the Hot Clube. The small patio at the back shown in the picture below is clearly recognisable.

On December 22, 2009, a fire, followed by a flood, severely damaged the building. The historical Hot Clube cellar was forced to close down (although the music school continued its activities, since it is located elsewhere in the city). However, two years later, the club reopened in a new venue in a nearby building in Praça da Alegria, not far from the original location. Its regular program of Jazz concerts resumed in 2012.
