= The Game of Truth =

1961 film

- Directed by: Robert Hossein
- Written by: Robert Chazal; Robert Hossein; Louis Martin; Steve Passeur; Jean Serge
- Produced by: Francis Lopez; Edmond Ténoudji
- Starring: Robert Hossein; Françoise Prévost; Paul Meurisse
- Cinematography: Christian Matras
- Edited by: Gilbert Natot
- Music by: André Hossein
- Production companies: Cocinor; Les Films Marceau; Lyrica
- Distributed by: Cocinor
- Release date: 29 November 1961
- Running time: 80 minutes
- Country: France
- Language: French

The Game of Truth (French: Le jeu de la vérité) is a 1961 French mystery film directed by Robert Hossein and starring Hossein, Françoise Prévost and Paul Meurisse.

== Cast ==
- Marc Cassot as Etienne Bribant
- Jacques Dacqmine as Guillaume Geder
- Nadia Gray as Solange Vérate
- Robert Hossein as L'inspecteur de police
- Tiny Yong as L'eurasienne(as Thien Huong)
- Daliah Lavi as Gisèle Palerse
- Perrette Pradier as Florence Geder
- Françoise Prévost as Guylaine de Fleury
- Georges Rivière as Bertrand Falaise
- Jean Servais as Jean-François Vérate
- Jean-Louis Trintignant as Guy de Fleury
- Jeanne Valérie as Françoise Bribant
- Paul Meurisse as Portrant

== Bibliography ==
- Philippe Rège. Encyclopedia of French Film Directors, Volume 1. Scarecrow Press, 2009.
