= Juliette Mills =

French actress and artist

- Born: 1 August 1945 (age 80); Neuilly-sur-Seine, France
- Occupations: Actress, artist
- Years active: 1965-1985 (Film and TV)

Juliette Mills (born 1945) is a French film and television actress. She played prominent roles in a number of films including The Gates of Fire (1972) Since the 1970s has been known also for her painting.

== Selected filmography ==
- How to Keep the Red Lamp Burning (1965)
- La grosse caisse (1965)
- Love in the Night (1970)
- Mon seul amour (1971, TV series)
- The Gates of Fire (1972)
- The Pebbles of Étretat (1972)
- La révélation (1973)
- The Irony of Chance (1974)
- Les murs ont des oreilles (1974)
- L'intrépide (1975)
- Le mille-pattes fait des claquettes (1977)
- Cop or Hood (1979)
- Le guépiot (1981)
- Dog Day (1984)

== Bibliography ==
- Deacon, Deborah A. & Fowler, Stacy. Military Women in World Cinema: A 20th Century History and Filmography. McFarland, 2023.
