= When Love Is Lust =

1973 drama film

- Directed by: Vittorio De Sisti
- Written by: Luigi Russo; Vittorio De Sisti
- Produced by: Enzo Doria
- Starring: Agostina Belli
- Cinematography: Aldo De Robertis
- Edited by: Angelo Curi
- Music by: Ennio Morricone
- Release date: June 13, 1973
- Country: Italy
- Language: Italian

When Love Is Lust (Italian: Quando l'amore è sensualità) is a 1973 erotic drama film co-written and directed by Vittorio De Sisti and starring Agostina Belli.

== Cast ==
- Agostina Belli as Erminia
- Gianni Macchia as Antonio
- Ewa Aulin as Angela
- Françoise Prévost as Giulia Sanfelice
- Femi Benussi as Angela
- Umberto Raho as Don Claudio
- Giovanni Rosselli as Paolo
- Monica Monet as junkie girl
- Rina Franchetti as Marta

== Production ==
The film had the working titles Una ragazza di paese ("A country girl") and Come è stata la cerimonia... Commuovente? ("How was the function... Moving?"). Agostina Belli described the filming as psychologically challenging for her, as the script dealt with strong themes such as violence and rape.

== Release ==
The film was released in Italian cinemas by Capitol Film on 16 June 1973.

== Reception ==
In Italy, the film was a hit, grossing 997 million lire. At the time of its release, Il Giorno film critic Maurizio Porro criticized its "clumsy, unrefined psychological setup", but eventually described the film as interesting for its "abandonment in the vein of the grotesque".
