= Cross of the Living =

1962 film

- Directed by: Ivan Govar
- Written by: Alain Cavalier; Maurice Clavel; Jean-Claude Dumoutier
- Starring: Giani Esposito; Karlheinz Böhm; Pascale Petit; Gabriele Ferzetti
- Release date: 1962
- Running time: 90 minute
- Countries: France; Belgium; Italy
- Language: French

Cross of the Living (La Croix des vivants) (L'amore impossibilie) is a 1962 French-Italian film. It stars Pascale Petit, Karlheinz Böhm and Gabriele Ferzetti.

== Cast ==
- Karlheinz Böhm - Gus
- Pascale Petit - Maria
- Giani Esposito - Yan
- Christine Darvel - Nell
- Alain Cuny - Baron Von Eggerth
- Madeleine Robinson - Mme Van Dorneck
- Gabriele Ferzetti - Abbe
- Roger Dumas - Sylvain
- Marika Green - Gretel
