= Way of Youth =

Le chemin des écoliers
- Directed by: Michel Boisrond
- Written by: Jean Aurenche; Pierre Bost (Adaptation et Dialogue)
- Based on: Le Chemin des écoliers by Marcel Aymé Librairie Gallimard
- Starring: Françoise Arnoul; Bourvil; Lino Ventura; Alain Delon
- Cinematography: Christian Matras
- Edited by: Louisette Hautecoeur
- Music by: Paul Misraki
- Color process: Black and white
- Production companies: Société de Productions Cinématographiques Européennes; Franco London Films; Mondex Films; Société Nouvelle des Établissements Gamount; Tempo Film; Zebra Films
- Distributed by: Gaumont Distribution
- Release date: 23 September 1959
- Running time: 81 minutes
- Country: France
- Language: French
- Box office: 2,516,405 admissions (France)

Le chemin des écoliers is a 1959 French drama film directed by Michel Boisrond and starring Françoise Arnoul, Bourvil, Lino Ventura and Alain Delon. It is based on the novel The Transient Hour by Marcel Aymé.

== Plot ==
To accommodate his mistress, Yvette, 17 year-old Antoine Michaud involves himself in black market activities with his friend, Paul Tiercelin.

== Cast ==
- Françoise Arnoul as Yvette Grandmaison
- Bourvil as Charles Michaud
- Lino Ventura as Tiercelin
- Alain Delon as Antoine Michaud
- Jean-Claude Brialy as Paul Tiercelin
- Pierre Mondy as Lulu
- Paulette Dubost as Hélène Michaud
- Micheline Luccioni as Solange, Charles Michaud’s secretary
- Christian Lude as Monsieur Ollivier, Charles Michaud’s associate
- Jean Brochard as Monsieur Coutelier
- Gaby Basset as Lucette, Tiercelin’s sister
- Claude Castaing as Dominique
- Martine Havet as Pierrette Michaud, Antoine’s little sister
- Sylviane Rozenberg as Chou, Yvette’s daughter
- Madeleine Lebeau as Flora
- Sandra Milo as Olga, a girl.

== See also ==
- List of French films of 1959
