= Forgive Us Our Trespasses (film) =

1956 film

- Directed by: Robert Hossein
- Written by: Robert Hossein; René Wheeler
- Produced by: Ray Ventura
- Starring: Marina Vlady; Pierre Vaneck; Giani Esposito
- Cinematography: Robert Juillard
- Edited by: Charles Bretoneiche
- Music by: André Hossein
- Production companies: Hoche Productions; Iéna Productions; Eden Productions
- Distributed by: Les Films Corona
- Release date: 1 August 1956
- Running time: 81 minutes
- Country: France
- Language: French

Forgive Us Our Trespasses (French: Pardonnez nos offenses) is a 1956 French drama film directed by Robert Hossein and starring Marina Vlady, Pierre Vaneck and Giani Esposito. It was shot at the Billancourt Studios in Paris. The film's sets were designed by the art director Jean Mandaroux.

== Cast ==
- Marina Vlady as Dédée
- Pierre Vaneck as René
- Giani Esposito as Vani
- Béatrice Altariba as Sassia
- Mireille Granelli as Ginette
- Roger Coggio as Jean-Lou
- Hélène Vallier as Rina
- Roger Dumas as Chocottes
- Julien Carette as La père Rapine
- Darío Moreno as Rebor
- Jacqueline Morane as La mama
- André Rouyer as Salade
- Paul Bisciglia as Coquillage

== Bibliography ==
- Marie, Michel. The French New Wave: An Artistic School. John Wiley & Sons, 2008.
- Rège, Philippe. Encyclopedia of French Film Directors, Volume 1. Scarecrow Press, 2009.
