= Serge Sauvion =

French actor (1929–2010)

Serge Sauvion (1929–2010) was a French actor.

He was the French voice of Peter Falk as Columbo.

== Selected filmography ==
- The Law of Men (1962)
- Thank You, Natercia (1963)
- The Mad Heart (1970)
- Les Assassins de l'ordre (1971)
- Julien Fontanes, magistrat (1980–81)
- Signes extérieurs de richesse (1983)
