= The Lovers of Lisbon =

1955 film by Henri Verneuil

The Lovers of Lisbon (Les amants du Tage)
- Directed by: Henri Verneuil
- Written by: Joseph Kessel (novel); Jacques Companéez; Marcel Rivet
- Produced by: Jacques Gauthier; Walter Rupp; Ray Ventura
- Starring: Daniel Gélin; Françoise Arnoul; Trevor Howard
- Cinematography: Roger Hubert
- Edited by: Christian Gaudin
- Music by: Lucien Legrand
- Production companies: ECC; Fidès; Hoche Productions
- Distributed by: Les Films Corona
- Release date: 8 February 1955
- Running time: 112 minutes
- Country: France
- Language: French

The Lovers of Lisbon (French: Les amants du Tage) is a 1955 French drama film directed by Henri Verneuil and starring Daniel Gélin, Françoise Arnoul, Trevor Howard and Betty Stockfeld. Two French exiles in Lisbon fall in love after each has murdered their respective spouse. It was based on a novel by Joseph Kessel.

The film's sets were designed by the art director Jean d'Eaubonne.

== Cast ==
- Daniel Gélin as Pierre Roubier
- Françoise Arnoul as Kathleen Dinver
- Trevor Howard as Inspector Lewis
- Marcel Dalio as Porfirio
- Amália Rodrigues as Amália
- Jacques Moulières as Manuel
- Ginette Leclerc as Maria
- Georges Chamarat as L'avocat
- Betty Stockfeld as Maisie
