= Georges Cravenne =

French film producer (1914–2009)

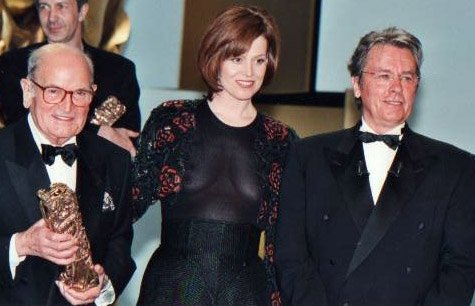
Georges Cravenne with Sigourney Weaver and Alain Delon at the 25th César Awards ceremony in 2000.

Georges Cravenne (French pronunciation: [ʒɔʁʒ(ə) kʁavɛn]; 24 January 1914 – 10 January 2009), real name Joseph-Raoul Cohen, was a French film producer, publicity agent and founder of the César Award. He received an Honorary César in 2000.

== Marriages ==
He married French actress Françoise Arnoul in 1956. They divorced in 1964.

On 18 October 1973, his second wife Danielle Cravenne was shot dead by a police sniper at Marignane airport in Marseille. Danielle, who was mentally unstable, had tried to hijack a Boeing 727 to protest against the release of the film The Mad Adventures of Rabbi Jacob which was being promoted by Cravenne and which she considered "anti-Palestinian", especially in the midst of the Yom Kippur War.
