= The Law of Men (1962 film) =

- Directed by: Charles Gérard
- Written by: Charles Gérard; Pascal Jardin
- Produced by: François Sweerts; Michel Sweerts
- Starring: Micheline Presle; Philippe Leroy; Pierre Mondy
- Cinematography: Claude Robin
- Edited by: Bernard Lefèvre
- Music by: André Hossein
- Production company: Filmatec
- Distributed by: Compagnie Française de Distribution Cinématographique
- Release date: 4 July 1962
- Running time: 90 minutes
- Country: France
- Language: French

The Law of Men (French: La loi des hommes) is a 1962 French crime film directed by Charles Gérard and starring Micheline Presle, Philippe Leroy and Pierre Mondy. After a planned robbery on an armoured car the investigating police officer encounters a female journalist who specialises in criminology, and who he suspects may have had a role in the heist.

== Cast ==
- Micheline Presle as Sophie Givier
- Philippe Leroy as Dandieu
- Pierre Mondy as Le juge Béguin
- Arletty as Loune de Lindt
- Marcel Dalio as L'avocat Plautet
- José Luis de Vilallonga as Le prêtre
- Gérard Buhr as le patron des Fourgons Blindés
- Robert Dalban as Le cafetier
- Mathilde Casadesus as Madame Thiebaut
- Yves Barsacq as Un inspecteur
- Berthe Granval as Le secrétaire
- Raoul Saint-Yves as Jules, le policier de faction
- Serge Sauvion as Jacky, un ami de Sophie
- Michel Constantin as Paulo, un ami de Sophie
- Jean-Loup Reynold as le projectionniste
- Jacqueline Huet as elle-même, présentatrice TV
- Joseph Pasteur as lui-même, journaliste
- Jacques Monod as Helmut

== Bibliography ==
- Anne Commire & Deborah Klezmer. Women in World History: A Biographical Encyclopedia, Volume 1. Yorkin Publications, 1999.
