= Françoise Prévost (actress) =

French actress

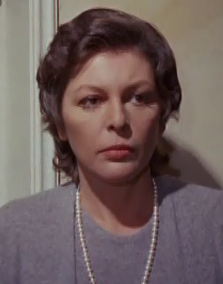
- Prévost in When Love Is Lust (1973)
- Born: 13 January 1930; Paris, France
- Died: 30 November 1997 (aged 67); Paris, France
- Occupation: Actress
- Years active: 1949–1985

Françoise Prévost (French: [fʁɑ̃swaz pʁevo]; 13 January 1930 – 30 November 1997) was a French actress, journalist and author. She was the daughter of writer Marcelle Auclair. She appeared in more than 70 films between 1949 and 1985.

== Life and career ==
Prévost was born and died in Paris, France. She made her film debut at 18, in Jean de la Lune. After several minor roles she emerged with the Nouvelle Vague, with roles of weight in films by Pierre Kast, Jean-Gabriel Albicocco and Jacques Rivette. Starting from 1960s she was also pretty active in Italian cinema, starring in leading roles in dramas, comedies and genre films. In 1975 Prévost gained critical appreciation and commercial success as an author, with an autobiographical book about her struggle against an incurable disease, Ma vie en plus.

== Selected filmography ==
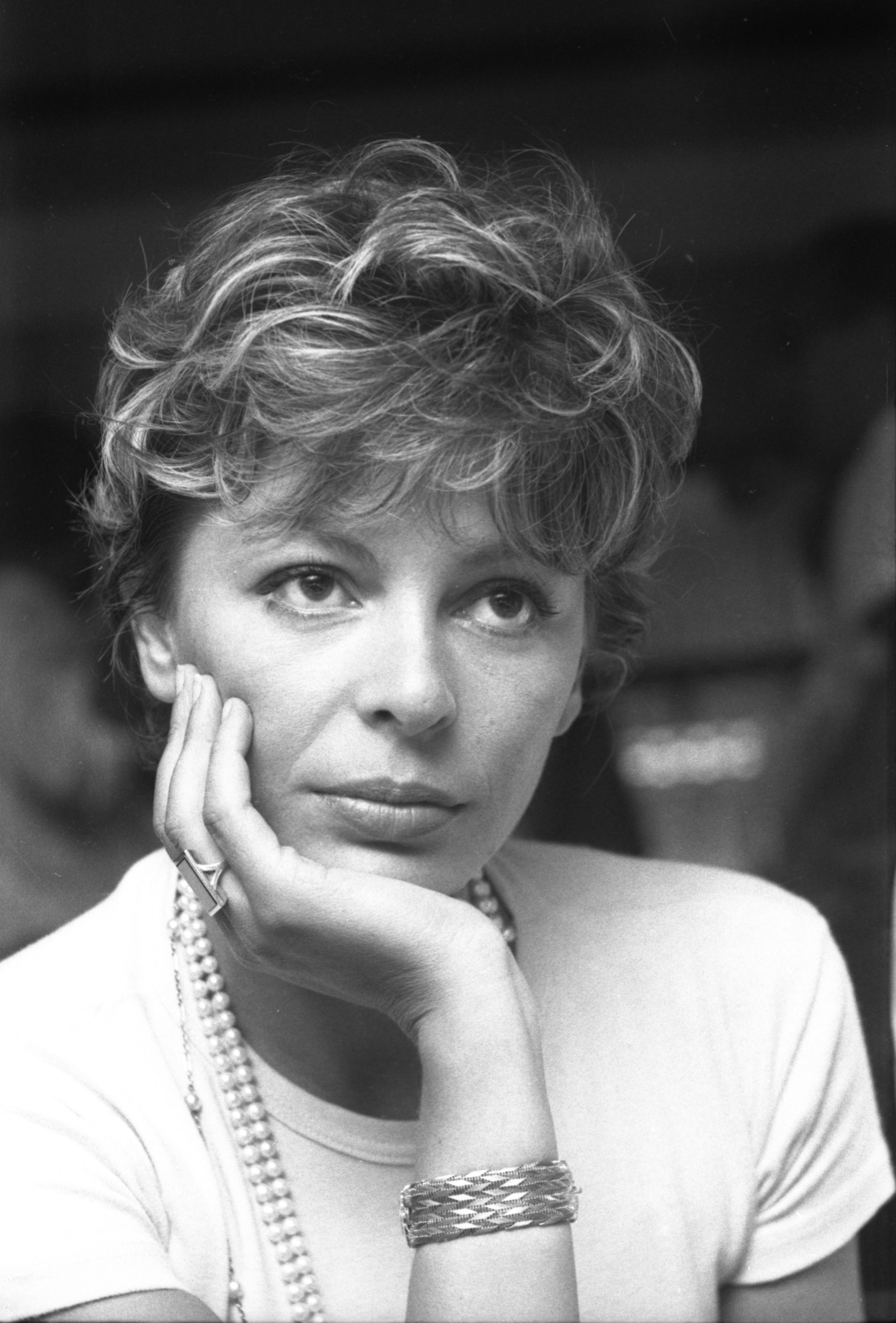
Françoise Prévost on her visit to Israel, 1964

- Jean de la Lune (1949) - (uncredited)
- Les miracles n'ont lieu qu'une fois (1951) - (uncredited)
- Clara de Montargis (1951)
- Leathernose (1952) - Une jeune invitée
- The Three Musketeers (1953) - Ketty
- Virgile (1953) - Mimi la Rouquine (uncredited)
- That Night (1958) - La secrétaire
- Le bel âge (1960) - Françoise
- The Enemy General (1960) - Nicole
- Women Are Like That (1960) - Isabelle
- Payroll (1961) - Katie Pearson
- Time Out for Love (1961) - Gladys
- Love Play (1961) - Anne de Limeuil
- The Season for Love (1961) - Françoise
- The Girl with the Golden Eyes (1961) - Eléonore San Real
- Par-dessus le mur (1961) - Une mère
- The Game of Truth (1961) - Guylaine de Fleury
- Paris Belongs to Us (1961) - Terry Yordan
- Roaring Years (1962) - Figlia del medico (uncredited)
- Le Signe du lion (1962) - Hélène (uncredited)
- Bon Voyage! (1962) - The Girl
- The Condemned of Altona (1962) - Leni von Gerlach
- The Sea (1962)
- Bekenntnisse eines möblierten Herrn (1963) - Lilli
- The Verona Trial (1963) - Frau Beetz
- A Sentimental Attempt (1963) - Carla
- Portuguese Vacation (1963) - Françoise
- Thank You, Natercia (1963) - Françoise
- A Man in His Prime (1964) - Lucy
- The Glass Cage (1965)
- Galia (1966) - Nicole
- The Murder Clinic (1966) - Gisèle de Brantome
- Via Macau (1966) - Colette
- Maigret and His Greatest Case (1966) - Simone Lefèbvre
- L'une et l'autre (1967) - Simone
- Pronto... c'è una certa Giuliana per te (1967) - Paolo's Mother
- Italian Secret Service (1968) - Elvira Spallanzani
- Johnny Hamlet (1968) - Gertry Hamilton
- Spirits of the Dead (1968) - Friend of Countess (segment "Metzengerstein")
- A Woman on Fire (1969) - Clara Frisotti
- Rabbit in the Pit (1969) - Francine
- Quarta parete (1969) - Cristiana
- Les vieilles lunes (1969)
- Sirokkó (1969)
- I ragazzi del massacro (1969)
- La donna a una dimensione (1969) - Paola
- Un caso di coscienza (1970) - Sandra Solfi
- A Suitcase for a Corpse (1970) - Diana Ardington
- Mont-Dragon (1970) - La comtesse Germaine de Boismenil
- La prima notte del dottor Danieli, industriale, col complesso del... giocattolo (1970) - Virginia
- The Hideout (1971) - Charlotte
- La saignée (1971) - Mother
- Le inibizioni del dottor Gaudenzi, vedovo, col complesso della buonanima (1971) - Laura Gaudenzi
- The Beasts (1971) - Clara Borsetti (segment "La voce del sangue")
- When Love Is Lust (1973) - Giulia Sanfelice
- Les anges (1973) - Anne
- The Sinful Nuns of Saint Valentine (1974) - The Abbess
- La prova d'amore (1974) - Angela Mother
- Mais où sont passées les jeunes filles en fleurs (1975) - Mme de Saintange
- Un urlo dalle tenebre (1975) - Barbara, Piero's mother
- The Pink Telephone (1975) - Françoise Castejac
- L'amour en herbe (1977) - La mère de Martine
- Mala, amore e morte (1977) - Adalgisa Belli
- Le soleil en face (1980) - Jeanne
- Merry-Go-Round (1981) - Renée Novick
- La côte d'amour (1982) - Jacqueline
