= The Pebbles of Étretat =

The Pebbles of Etratat
- Directed by: Sergio Gobbi
- Written by: Vahé Katcha; Sergio Gobbi
- Starring: Virna Lisi
- Cinematography: Daniel Diot
- Music by: Georges Garvarentz
- Release date: 1972
- Language: French

The Pebbles of Étretat (French: Les galets d'Étretat, Italian: Improvvisamente una sera, un amore, also known as Cobblestones) is a 1972 French-Italian romance-drama film written and directed by Sergio Gobbi. Étretat is a coastal commune in the Seine-Maritime department in Normandie region in north-western France.

== Cast ==
- Virna Lisi as Alny
- Maurice Ronet as Kelvo
- Annie Cordy as Brigitte
- Juliette Mills as Florence
- Grégoire Aslan as Timakoff
- Christian Barbier as Jean-Pierre
- Philippe Baronnet as François
- Michel Robbe as Régis
- Amarande as Mme Grance
