= Pierre Dudan =

Swiss singer, actor and writer (1916–1984)

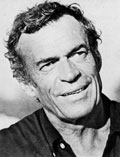
- Born: 1 February 1916; Moscow, Russian Empire
- Died: 4 February 1984 (aged 68); Épalinges, Switzerland
- Resting place: Bois-de-Vaux Cemetery, Lausanne
- Occupations: Actor, singer
- Years active: 1942–1979 (film & TV)

Pierre Dudan (1916–1984) was a Russian-born Swiss actor and singer. He was born in Moscow to a Russian mother and a Swiss father. He married four times.

== Selected filmography ==
- Night Warning (1946)
- Naughty Martine (1947)
- The Fugitive (1947)
- The Patron (1950)
- Casabianca (1951)
- The Lyons in Paris (1955)
- If Paris Were Told to Us (1956)
- A Touch of the Sun (1956)
- Anyone Can Kill Me (1957)
- The Roots of Heaven (1958)
- Certains l'aiment froide (1960)
- Dans l'eau qui fait des bulles (1961)
- Sentimental Education (1962)
- Thank You, Natercia (1963)

== Bibliography ==
- Goble, Alan. The Complete Index to Literary Sources in Film. Walter de Gruyter, 1999.
