= The Cat (1958 film) =

1958 film

- Directed by: Henri Decoin
- Written by: Henri Decoin; Jacques Rémy; Eugène Tucherer (novel)
- Produced by: Eugène Tucherer
- Starring: Françoise Arnoul; Bernhard Wicki; André Versini
- Cinematography: Pierre Montazel
- Edited by: Claude Durand
- Music by: Joseph Kosma
- Production companies: Elysées Films; Films Metzger et Woog
- Distributed by: Discifilm
- Release date: 18 April 1958
- Running time: 108 minutes
- Country: France
- Language: French

The Cat (French: La chatte) is a 1958 French war drama film directed by Henri Decoin and starring Françoise Arnoul, Bernhard Wicki and André Versini. It was shot at the Billancourt Studios in Paris. The film's sets were designed by the art director Lucien Aguettand. The story is loosely based on that of the Resistance operative Mathilde Carré during the Second World War. A commercial success, it was followed by a sequel The Cat Shows Her Claws in 1960.

== Cast ==
- Françoise Arnoul as Suzanne Ménessier dite Cora
- Bernhard Wicki as Bernard Werner
- André Versini as Henry
- Roger Hanin as Pierre
- Kurt Meisel as Capitaine Heinz Muller
- Louison Roblin as Bernadette
- Harald Wolff as Colonel Richting
- Bernard Blier as Debrun
- Michel Jourdan as Olivier
- Jacques Meyran
- Vanna Urbino
- Grégoire Gromoff
- Christian Brocard
- Mario David as Un résistant
- Pierre Durou
- Françoise Fabrice
- Lutz Gabor s L'ordonnance
- Marie Glory
- Daniel Mendaille
- Pierre Mirat as Le cheminot
- Dominique Zardi as Extra

== Bibliography ==
- Dayna Oscherwitz & MaryEllen Higgins. The A to Z of French Cinema. Scarecrow Press, 2009.
