= Giani Esposito =

French actor and singer (1930–1974)

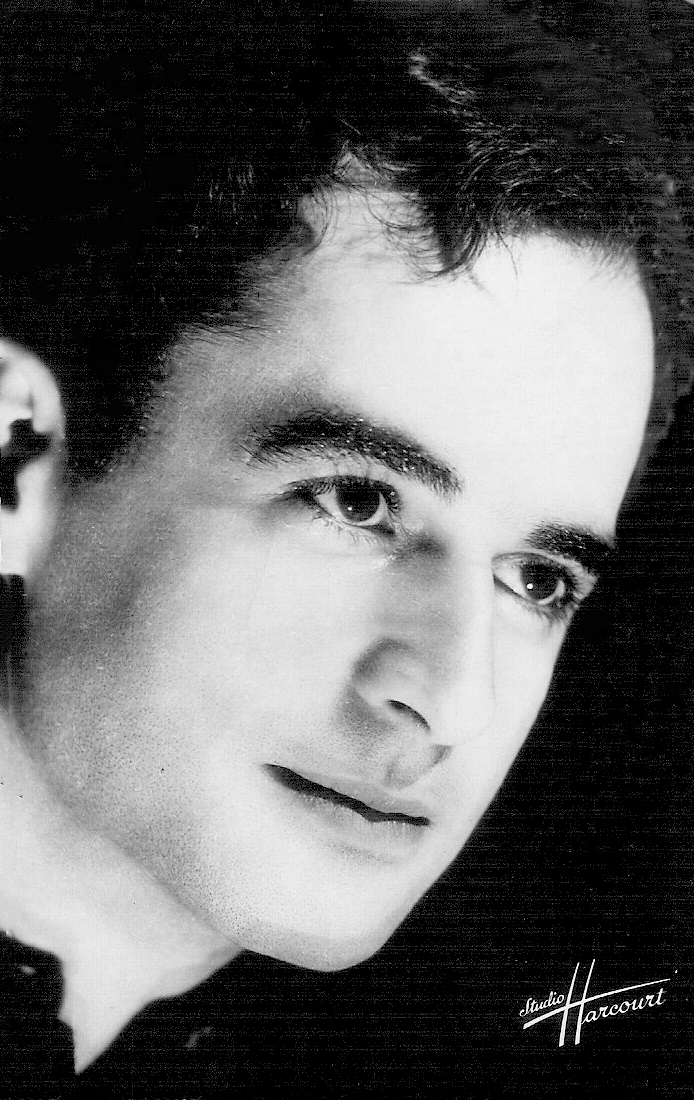
- Born: 23 August 1930; Etterbeek, Belgium
- Died: 1 January 1974 (aged 43); Neuilly-sur-Seine, France
- Other names: Gianni Esposito; Giovanni Esposito
- Occupation: Actor
- Years active: 1951–1973

Giani Esposito (23 August 1930 – 1 January 1974) was a French film actor and singer-songwriter.

Esposito was born from the union of a French mother with an Italian father in Etterbeek (Belgium), and he died from viral hepatitis in Neuilly-sur-Seine, France. He appeared in 50 films between 1951 and 1973.

As a singer-songwriter, between 1958 and 1973, he recorded numerous albums marked with spirituality and poetry. His biggest success is The Clowns (Les Clowns, 1957), several covers by Raymond Devos, Jeanne-Marie Sens, Hervé Vilard and Bernard Lavilliers.

He was married to the French actress Pascale Petit and they had a girl, Doushka Esposito (born in 1963), today a singer, and younger, under the name of Douchka, she was ambassadress of Walt Disney's productions on the French television.

== Partial filmography ==
- Skipper Next to God (1951) – Un passager juif (uncredited)
- My Wife Is Formidable (1951) – Le barman de l'hôtel (uncredited)
- Leathernose (1952) – Un jeune invité
- Agence matrimoniale (1952) – (uncredited)
- My Husband Is Marvelous (1952) – Un journaliste
- A Hundred Francs a Second (1953) – Un cheminot en grève (uncredited)
- La môme vert-de-gris (1953) – Le capitaine du bateau
- Quay of Blondes (1954) – Un tueur
- The Women Couldn't Care Less (1954) – Man at the Poker Game (uncredited)
- Cadet Rousselle (1954) – Monseigneur
- Huis clos (1954) – Diego – le disciple de Garcin
- French Cancan (1955) – Prince Alexandre
- Black Dossier (1955) – Jean de Montesson
- Les mauvaises rencontres (1955) – Pierre Jaeger
- Les Hussards (1955) – Pietro
- Cela s'appelle l'aurore (1956) – Sandro Galli
- Forgive Us Our Trespasses (1956) – Vani
- The Schemer (1957) – Claude Watroff
- Les Misérables (1958) – Marius Pontmercy
- Le bel âge (1960) – Claude
- Normandie – Niémen (1960) – Lemaître
- Vers l'extase (1960) – Jérôme
- Paris Belongs to Us (1961) – Gerard Lenz
- Cross of the Living (1962) – Yan
- Anatomy of a Marriage: My Days with Jean-Marc (1964) – Ettore
- Anatomy of a Marriage: My Days with Françoise (1964) – Ettore
- The Sea Pirate (1966) – Napoléon
- Il grande colpo di Surcouf (1966) – Napoléon
- The Decameron (1971)

== Discography ==
- Les Clowns (1959)
- Jardiniers qui doutez de l'arbre de vie (1967)
- Un noble rossignol à l'époque Ming (1968)
- Les ombres sont chinoises (1970)
- Paris, le désert (1972)
