= Not Three =

- Directed by: Alain Bornet
- Produced by: António da Cunha Telles
- Starring: Clara D'Ovar; Annie Fratellini; Jean-Loup Reynold
- Cinematography: Luc Mirot; Elso Roque
- Production company: Produções Cunha Telles
- Release date: 1964
- Running time: 90 minutes
- Countries: France; Portugal
- Language: French

Not Three (French: Le pas de trois) is a 1964 French-Portuguese comedy film directed by Alain Bornet and starring Clara D'Ovar, Annie Fratellini and Jean-Loup Reynold.

== Cast ==
- Clara D'Ovar as Duke's daughter
- Annie Fratellini as Duke's waitress
- Jean-Loup Reynold as Chantagista / Blackmailer
- Costinha as Duke's servant
- Madeleine Delavaivre as Duchess
- Jean Tissier as Duke

== Bibliography ==
- José de Matos Cruz. Cinema português: o dia do século. Grifo, 1998.
