= Portuguese Vacation =

- Directed by: Pierre Kast
- Written by: Pierre Kast; Alain Aptekman; Jacques Doniol-Valcroze; Robert Scipion
- Produced by: Clara D'Ovar; António da Cunha Telles; Peter Oser
- Starring: Françoise Arnoul; Michel Auclair; Jean-Pierre Aumont
- Cinematography: Raoul Coutard
- Edited by: Yannick Bellon; Etiennette Muse
- Music by: Georges Delerue
- Production company: Jad Films
- Release date: 9 October 1963
- Running time: 97 minutes
- Countries: France; Portugal
- Language: French

Portuguese Vacation (French: Vacances portugaises) is a 1963 French-Portuguese drama film directed by Pierre Kast and starring Françoise Arnoul, Michel Auclair and Jean-Pierre Aumont.

== Cast ==
- Françoise Arnoul as Mathilde
- Michel Auclair as Michel
- Jean-Pierre Aumont as Jean-Pierre
- Jean-Marc Bory as Jean-Marc
- Françoise Brion as Eléonore
- Catherine Deneuve as Catherine
- Jacques Doniol-Valcroze as Jacques
- Daniel Gélin as Daniel
- Michèle Girardon as Geneviève
- Barbara Laage as Barbara
- Françoise Prévost as Françoise
- Pierre Vaneck as Pierre
- Bernhard Wicki as Bernard
- Clara D'Ovar
- Roger Hanin
- Édouard Molinaro

== Bibliography ==
- Dayna Oscherwitz & MaryEllen Higgins. The A to Z of French Cinema. Scarecrow Press, 2009.
