= Mission to Venice (film) =

- Directed by: André Versini
- Written by: Jacques Robert; André Versini; James Hadley Chase (novel)
- Starring: Sean Flynn
- Cinematography: André Germain
- Release date: 1964
- Running time: 88 minutes
- Countries: France; Italy; West Germany
- Languages: French; English

Mission to Venice is a 1964 French-Italian-West German film starring Sean Flynn loosely based on a novel by James Hadley Chase and directed by André Versini.

It is also known as Agent Spécial à Venise aka Voir Venise et... Crever.

== Plot ==
A man looking for a missing husband stumbles upon a spy ring. Michael Newman (Sean Flynn) is asked by the wife of a friend of his father to help search for her missing husband. When Michael asks a friend of his father's who was his superior, about the missing man, he tells Michael that the missing man is a traitor. Michael then goes to Venice where the man was last seen. In Venice Michael meets an icy blonde (Karen Baal) and her "husband" who know something about the missing man. After some harrowing experiences, where a girl is murdered, the missing man is found tortured half to death. The missing man has proof of the spy ring and is also proven to be undercover and not a traitor. The man who was not actually the husband of the icy blonde turns out to be leader of the spies and tries to get the document proof from Newman. Newman is able to outsmart the spy leader, turn him over to the authorities and goes off with the icy blonde.

== Cast ==
- Sean Flynn as Michel Newman
- Madeleine Robinson as Marie Trégard
- Karin Baal as Maria Natzka
- Hannes Messemer as Carl Natzka
- Pierre Mondy as Paul Trégard
- Daniel Emilfork as Mr. Coliso
- Jacques Dufilho as César
- Ettore Manni
