= The Gates of Fire =

1972 film

- Directed by: Claude Bernard-Aubert
- Written by: Claude Bernard-Aubert; Roger Delpey
- Produced by: Roger Delpey
- Starring: Emmanuelle Riva; Dany Carrel; Annie Cordy; Juliette Mills
- Cinematography: Raymond Le Moigne
- Edited by: Andrée Davanture
- Music by: Alain Goraguer
- Production company: Paris Film Productions
- Distributed by: Alcifrance
- Release date: 15 March 1972
- Running time: 89 minutes
- Country: France
- Language: French

The Gates of Fire (French: Les portes de feu) is a 1972 French war drama film directed by Claude Bernard-Aubert and starring Emmanuelle Riva, Dany Carrel, Annie Cordy and Juliette Mills. Location shooting took place in the Camargue in Southern France standing in for wartime Libya.

== Synopsis ==
In 1942 during the North African campaign of World War II, four Free French nurses are captured by a German patrol during Rommel's offensive following the First Battle of El Alamein. After a psychological trying time they are eventually able to turn the tables on their captors and bring them back to Allied lines.

== Cast ==
- Emmanuelle Riva as La baronne
- Dany Carrel as Solange
- Annie Cordy as Andrée
- Juliette Mills as Lili
- Georges Aminel as Le docteur
- Jacques Brunet as Ludwig
- Rolph Spath as Hans
- Jacques Balutin as Soldat de garde
- Alexandre Grecq as Kurd
- Antoine Baud as Franz

== Bibliography ==
- Deacon, Deborah A. & Fowler, Stacy. Military Women in World Cinema: A 20th Century History and Filmography. McFarland, 2023.
- Rège, Philippe. Encyclopedia of French Film Directors, Volume 1. Scarecrow Press, 2009.
