= The Goose of Sedan =

1959 film directed by Helmut Käutner

- Directed by: Helmut Käutner
- Written by: Jean L'Hôte (novel); Helmut Käutner
- Produced by: Paul Claudon; Walter Ulbrich
- Starring: Hardy Krüger; Jean Richard; Dany Carrel; Françoise Rosay
- Cinematography: Jacques Letellier
- Edited by: Klaus Dudenhöfer
- Music by: Bernhard Eichhorn
- Production companies: UFA; C.A.P.A.C.
- Distributed by: UFA (West Germany)
- Release date: 22 December 1959
- Running time: 90 minutes
- Countries: France; West Germany
- Language: German

The Goose of Sedan (German: Die Gans von Sedan) is a 1959 French–West German comedy war film directed by Helmut Käutner and starring Hardy Krüger, Jean Richard and Dany Carrel. It was based on the novel Un Dimanche au Champ D'Honneur by Jean L'Hôte. The film was one of a growing number of co-productions between the two countries during the era. It was also released under the alternative title Without Trumpet or Drum.

The film was shot at the Billancourt Studios in Paris. The film's sets were designed by the art director Serge Piménoff.

== Synopsis ==
After the Battle of Sedan (1870) during the Franco-Prussian War, a French soldier and a German soldier become separated from their respective units. Taking shelter in a farmhouse, the two begin to bond despite their rivalry over a woman.

== Partial Cast ==
- Hardy Krüger as Fritz Brösicke
- Jean Richard as Leon Riffard
- Dany Carrel as Marguerite
- Françoise Rosay as La grand-mère de Marguerite
- Theo Lingen as Colonel Tuplitz
- Helmut Käutner as Königliche Hoheit
- Fritz Tillmann as Hauptmann Knöpfer
- Ralf Wolter as Uhlan Lehmann
- Lucien Nat as Captain

== Bibliography ==
- Bergfelder, Tim. International Adventures: German Popular Cinema and European Co-productions in the 1960s. Berghahn Books, 2005.
- Kreimeier, Klaus. The Ufa Story: A History of Germany's Greatest Film Company, 1918–1945. University of California Press, 1999.
