= Christine Gouze-Rénal =

French film and television producer

Christine Gouze-Rénal (30 December 1914 − 25 October 2002) was a French film and television producer. A graduate in literature and art history and former Résistance member, she became in 1956 France's first female film producer with The Bride Is Much Too Beautiful, starring Brigitte Bardot.

She produced a total of about 15 movies, the most celebrated being probably Jacques Demy's Une chambre en ville (1983). From the 1970s onwards, she was also active as a television producer, with adaptations of works by Colette, Maupassant, Balzac and Buzzati. In 1985, she was awarded an honorary César for lifetime achievement.

Gouze-Rénal was the wife of actor Roger Hanin and the elder sister of Danielle Mitterrand, wife of President François Mitterrand.

== Selected filmography ==
- The Most Gentle Confessions (1971)
- The Irony of Chance (1974)
