= The Irony of Chance =

1974 film

- Directed by: Édouard Molinaro
- Written by: Pierre Kast; Édouard Molinaro; Paul Guimard
- Based on: The Irony of Chance by Paul Guimard
- Produced by: Christine Gouze-Rénal
- Starring: Pierre Clémenti; Marie-Hélène Breillat; Jacques Spiesser
- Cinematography: Alain Levent
- Edited by: Monique Isnardon; Robert Isnardon
- Music by: José Berghmans
- Production companies: ORTF; Union Générale Cinématographique
- Distributed by: Compagnie Française de Distribution Cinématographique
- Release date: 30 April 1974
- Running time: 82 minutes
- Country: France
- Language: French

The Irony of Chance (French: L'ironie du sort) is a 1974 French war drama film directed by Édouard Molinaro and starring Pierre Clémenti, Marie-Hélène Breillat and Jacques Spiesser. It is based on a 1960 novel of the same title by Paul Guimard.

== Synopsis ==
In Nantes in 1944 during the German occupation, a trio of French Resistance operatives find out that a German Wehrmacht officer has discovered the identity of their network and is planning to inform that Gestapo. They plan to kill him, but the film outlines the very different outcomes both if they are successful or if they fail.

== Cast ==
- Pierre Clémenti as Antoine Desvrières
- Marie-Hélène Breillat as Anne
- Jacques Spiesser as Jean Rimbert
- Reinhard Kolldehoff as Helmut
- Jean Desailly as M. Desvrières
- Brigitte Fossey as Ursula
- Juliette Mills as Micheline
- Hans Verner as Brauner
- Konrad von Bork as Hans
- Jean Lanier as Hauteclaire
- Pierre Vaneck as Werner Von Rompsay
- Claude Rich as Morin

== Bibliography ==
- Rège, Philippe. Encyclopedia of French Film Directors, Volume 1. Scarecrow Press, 2009.
- Rousso, Henry. The Vichy Syndrome: History and Memory in France Since 1944. Harvard University Press, 1991.
