= Roger Dumas (actor) =

French actor (1932–2016)

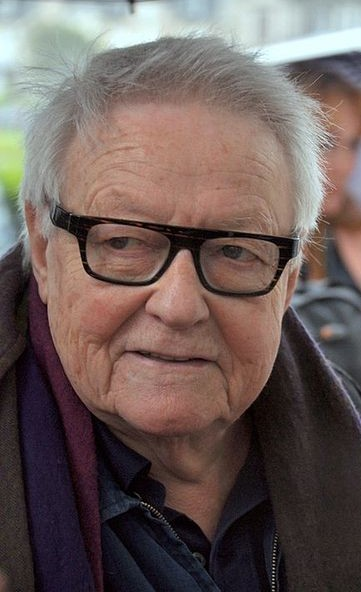
- Dumas in 2011 at the Cabourg Film festival
- Born: 9 May 1932; Annonay, France
- Died: 2 July 2016 (aged 84)
- Occupation: Actor
- Years active: 1954–2016

Roger Dumas (9 May 1932 – 2 July 2016) was a French film actor. He appeared in more than 100 films between 1954 and 2016. He was born in Annonay, Ardèche.

== Selected filmography ==
- Wild Fruit (1954) - Hans
- Before the Deluge (1954) - Un élève (uncredited)
- Les premiers outrages (1955) - Jojo - l'employé de l'auberge
- Maid in Paris (1956) - Un jeune dragueur au jardin
- If All the Guys in the World (1956) - Jean-Pierre
- Forgive Us Our Trespasses (1956)
- Les promesses dangereuses (1956) - La Bourride
- The Bride Is Much Too Beautiful (1956) - Marc
- Isabelle Is Afraid of Men (1957) - Maxime Brissac
- Mimi Pinson (1958) - Pierrot
- Asphalte (1959) - Marcel
- Rue des prairies (1959) - Fernand Neveux
- Signé Arsène Lupin (1959) - Isidore Bautrelet dit Véritaz
- Carillons sans joie (1962) - Adolphe Charlier, dit 'le môme'
- Cross of the Living (1962) - Sylvain
- The Deadly Decoy (1962) - Louis
- Pouic-Pouic (1963) - Paul Monestier
- That Man from Rio (1964) - Lebel, Dufourquet's Buddy
- La chance et l'amour (1964) - Taupin (segment "Chance du guerrier, La")
- Le Tigre aime la chair fraiche (1964) - Duvet
- Our Agent Tiger (1965) - Duvet
- La Ligne de démarcation (1966) - Chéti, le passeur / Passer
- Darling Caroline (1968) - Clément, l'ancien jardinier du comte
- Bruno, l'enfant du dimanche (1969) - Jean-Claude
- Du blé en liasses (1969) - Faubst
- Dédé la tendresse (1974)
- La Rage au poing (1975) - Le voisin
- Le bougnoul (1975) - Jeannot
- Le faux-cul (1975) - Frémicourt
- Un tueur, un flic, ainsi soit-il... (1977) - Michaud
- Tendre Poulet (1977) - Marcel Guérin, l'inspecteur
- Général... nous voilà! (1978) - Bazas
- Le Marginal (1983) - Inspecteur Simon
- Fort Saganne (1984) - Vulpi
- The Public Woman (1984) - André, le photographe
- L'amour en douce (1985) - Georges
- Suivez mon regard (1986) - L'homme au pouce cassé
- Le débutant (1986) - Marceau
- Masks (1987) - Manu
- Association of Wrongdoers (1987) - Superintendent Brunet
- Chouans! (1988) - Bouchard
- Les Années sandwiches (1988) - L'homme au chien
- Bunker Palace Hôtel (1989) - Zarka
- A Tale of Winter (1992) - Léontès
- Loulou Graffiti (1992) - De mirmont
- Pétain (1993) - Bonhomme
- A New Life (1993) - Martin
- New World (1995) - The Priest
- Tykho Moon (1996) - Patron
- Soleil (1997) - Mr. Muraton
- The Visitors II: The Corridors of Time (1998) - Maître Valoche
- Sentimental Destinies (2000) - Pauline's boss
- Inch'Allah Dimanche (2001) - Monsieur Donze
- Le Cri (2006, TV Mini-Series) - Le chef compatible
- Comedy of Power (2006) - René Lange
- Le Grand Meaulnes (2006) - L'horloger
- Hunting and Gathering (2007) - Le patron du 'restaurant des voyageurs'
- I Always Wanted to Be a Gangster (2007) - Pierrot la Pince
- Ca$h (2008) - Emile
- The First Day of the Rest of Your Life (2008) - Pierre
- Bank Error in Your Favour (2009) - Lebrun
- La différence, c'est que c'est pas pareil (2009) - Pierrot la Pince
- Le concert (2009) - Momo
- Dumas (2010) - M. de Saint Omer
- Derrière les murs (2011) - Père Francis
- Zarafa (2012) - Charles X (voice)
- Premiers crus (2015) - Grand-Jacques
