= Paris Belongs to Us =

1961 film

- Film poster
- Directed by: Jacques Rivette
- Written by: Jean Gruault; Jacques Rivette
- Produced by: Claude Chabrol; Roland Nonin
- Starring: Betty Schneider; Giani Esposito; Françoise Prévost
- Cinematography: Charles L. Bitsch
- Edited by: Denise de Casabianca
- Music by: Philippe Arthuys
- Release date: 13 December 1961
- Running time: 141 minutes
- Country: France
- Language: French

Paris Belongs to Us (French: Paris nous appartient, sometimes translated as Paris Is Ours) is a 1961 French mystery film directed by Jacques Rivette in his feature-length directorial debut.

The story centres on young university student Anne who, through her older brother, meets a group of people haunted by mysterious tensions and fears and the deaths of two of its members. The source of the malaise affecting the group is never explained, leaving viewers to wonder how far it might be an amalgam of individual imbalances, general existentialist anxiety, or the paranoia of the Cold War as the world faced the possibility of nuclear annihilation.

== Plot ==
The film opens with literature student Anne who is reading Shakespeare when she hears sounds of distress in the next room. There she finds a Spanish girl who says her brother Juan has been killed by dark forces. Anne then meets with her own brother Pierre, who takes her to a party held by some of his friends.

Initially bored and knowing nobody, she gradually becomes fascinated by mysterious interactions around her. Juan, a musician and anti-Franco refugee, has recently died from a knife wound which some think was a suicide. Philip, an unsteady American refugee from McCarthyism, gets drunk and later slaps a smartly dressed woman named Terry, accusing her of causing Juan's death by breaking up with him. Terry, who had also been the lover of Philip, is now together with theatre director Gérard.

The next day, Anne meets with a friend who is an aspiring actor, and he takes her to a rehearsal of Shakespeare's Pericles, the director of which proves to be Gérard. Because the actress for the part of Marina has not arrived, Anne is asked to read, and she performs well. Afterward she runs into Philip, who recounts long tales in veiled language about sinister interests that have destroyed Juan and may now get Gérard too.

Anne becomes determined to resolve the mystery that is obsessing the lives of the people she met, including a missing music recording by Juan which Gérard had planned to use for his play, and predictions that Gérard might end up dead like Juan. Gérard eventually dies, either by suicide or the machinations of an ominous group which according to Philip and Terry is heading for world domination. Terry kills Pierre who is supposedly part of the conspiracy, but later admits that it might exist only in Philip's mind.

== Cast ==
- Betty Schneider as Anne Goupil
- François Maistre as Pierre Goupil
- Giani Esposito as Gérard Lenz
- Françoise Prévost as Terry Yordan
- Daniel Crohem as Philip Kaufman
- Jean-Claude Brialy as Jean-Marc
- Jean-Marie Robain as Dr. de Georges

== Production ==
Written in 1957, shot from July to November 1958, but not released until 13 December 1961, it was the film critic Rivette's first full-length film as a director and one of the early works of the French New Wave. Like his fellow Cahiers du cinéma critic Éric Rohmer, Rivette did not find popularity with his early films, and unlike many of the New Wave directors, he remained at Cahiers for most of the core New Wave era from 1958 to 1968, only completing two more full-length films during this time.

As a New Wave characteristic, the film includes cameos for fellow directors Claude Chabrol (who also co-produced the film), Jean-Luc Godard, Jacques Demy and Rivette himself.

== Reception ==
The film was met by some London film critics with furious incomprehension; however, it was awarded the Sutherland Trophy by the British Film Institute as the most original and innovative film introduced at the National Film Theatre during the year. It had only a brief commercial run in London.

Film critic Jonathan Rosenbaum liked the film: "Jacques Rivette’s troubled and troubling 1960 account of Parisians in the late 50s remains the most intellectually and philosophically mature, and one of the most beautiful...Few films have more effectively captured a period and milieu; Rivette evokes bohemian paranoia and sleepless nights in tiny one-room flats, along with the fragrant, youthful idealism conveyed by the film’s title".

Richard Brody of The New Yorker reviewed the film positively: "Rivette’s tightly wound images turn the ornate architecture of Paris into a labyrinth of intimate entanglements and apocalyptic menace; he evokes the fearsome mysteries beneath the surface of life and the enticing illusions that its masterminds, whether human or divine, create."

The critic Hamish Ford stated: "... for me at least, his debut feature is a perfect film in its way. If the first work of a long career should, at least in the oeuvre-charting rear-vision mirror, offer an appropriately characteristic or even perhaps idiosyncratic entry point into a distinct film-world, then Paris nous appartient is indeed a perfect 'first' Rivette in its combination of formal daring and conceptual elusiveness."

On review aggregator website Rotten Tomatoes, the film holds an approval rating of 86% based on 14 reviews, with an average rating of 6.8/10.
