= Passionate Summer (1956 film) =

1956 film by Charles Brabant

Passionate Summer (French: Les Possédées, Italian: L'isola delle capre) is a 1956 French-language, French-Italian film directed by Charles Brabant.

Its basis is the play Island of Goats, written by Ugo Betti.

The premise is that three women who live on an island encounter a man, Angelo, and vie for his affections. He convinces the women to be angry at one another, and at some point they become angry at him.

== Cast ==
- Dany Carrel (Sylvia)
- Magali Noël (Pia)
- Madeleine Robinson (Agatha)
- Raf Vallone
  - Wanda Hale of the New York Daily News described Vallone's character as a "lady-killer".

== Reception ==
Philip K. Schuer of the Los Angeles Times wrote that the acting was "wonderfully realistic" and that it "remains mesmerizing".
