= Belarmino =

1964 film

- Directed by: Fernando Lopes
- Produced by: António da Cunha Telles
- Starring: Belarmino Fragoso; Albano Martins; Baptista-Bastos
- Cinematography: Augusto Cabrita
- Music by: Manuel Ruas; Jean-Pierre Gebler
- Distributed by: Produções Cunha Telles
- Release date: 18 November 1964
- Running time: 74 minutes
- Country: Portugal
- Language: Portuguese

Belarmino is a 1964 Portuguese docufiction. It charts the life and times of ex-boxer Belarmino Fragoso. It is one of the first films of the Portuguese Cinema Novo, itself part of a wave of New Cinemas sweeping the world in the 1960s, and a break from the previous tradition of Portuguese cinema exemplified by the comédia à portuguesa. Lopes's film was shown at the festivals of Pesaro and Salso-Poretta in Italy, garnered favourable reviews throughout Europe and won the Prémio da Casa da Imprensa back in Portugal. It was shown twice in 2024 at the Film Institute of the Museum of Modern Art, also in 2024 at the Harvard Film Archive, and in 2020 was called a "hidden masterpiece" by New Yorker.

== Synopsis ==
Belarmino comprises two strands: an experiential and an interview strand, and constantly alternates between the two. Although these are carefully intertwined on both the sound and image track, they can be separated for ease of discussion.

=== The Experiential Strand ===
The Experiential Strand is principally concerned with registering Fragoso's current and former activities. After the opening credits, in which we see a montage of stills of Belarmino taken in the streets of Lisbon, there follows a sequence showing the ex-boxer at a training session in his former boxing club. We are shown scenes of the daily domestic routine of Fragoso and his wife at their home in the Rua Barros Queirós, which seems at once both fragile and tranquil. We later see them eating at a casa de pasto with their daughter. We also see footage shot at the Grupo Desportivo da Mouraria, a small neighbourhood association where Belarmino first began to box and where he met the man who was to manage him for the most part of his career: Albano Martins. Here youths who are presumably the next generation of hopeful boxers train against a backdrop filled with the paraphernalia of traditional neighbourhood life.

In the next section, which concentrates on Belarmino's life in the streets, we see the ex-boxer walking along his home street and through Lisbon's downtown. He approaches a young woman to her obvious displeasure. Later, Belarmino sits on an esplanade, drinking coffee and whistling, partly at women passers-by and partly to himself. We again see Belarmino training, this time outside on the track of Sporting Clube de Portugal’s old Alvalade stadium. This sequence is juxtaposed with a return to the boxer walking through the streets of the Baixa. He passes by one of the old cinemas of that area, which has posters for westerns and horror films pasted on its doors. The camera accompanies Belarmino through the midst of a great number of people who seem to be milling around aimlessly. As Belarmino moves through the streets, we hear not atmospheric noise but the sounds of a screening in a cinema auditorium. At one point there is a tilt-up of the façade of the Cinema Eden, which shows us Belarmino's view of a poster announcing the film A Miúda da Bica showing its lead, Fernando Farinha. There comes another sequence showing Belarmino seated at a table in a café, but this time in its interior. He is working as a photo-colourist. A bolero plays on the soundtrack.

Belarmino is then asked if he could still fight a man his own weight. We do not hear an answer to this question, but in the next scene, do see the boxer undergoing the sort of medical examination normally preliminary to a match. There is a cut to his arrival at the ring to fight a Spanish boxer, Toni Alonso. This is a carefully edited scene, in the same style as the opening scene in the gym. The montage accompanies the rhythm of the combat and the sequence is punctuated by stills. From the ringside there is a cut to a scene in the Hot Club of Portugal, a jazz venue. There is no tangible link to the ex-boxer's story as he is not present. We then see Belarmino at another venue, the Ritz Clube. The fact that this is an entirely different location is not made explicit by the editing, which instead works to place the two in parallel. A strip tease is announced on stage at the Ritz Clube, followed by a shot of Fragoso staring intensely on (though we see none of the show). There is a cut to a long, high angle shot of the ex-boxer dancing with a woman and it is implied that she might be a prostitute, especially as Fragoso had just been quizzed upon rumours of his consorting with sex workers.

The scene in the Ritz Clube is further crosscut with scenes from the Hot Clube, in which we see a romance developing between the saxophone player of the band playing and a woman in the audience. They dance together as dawn breaks and the scene ends with a curious tilt up a tower. There follows a sequence in which Fragoso drinks water from a fountain in downtown Lisbon. This, for its part, is intercut with footage from the boxing match with Toni Alonso. The next sequence in the experiential strand then closes the film, with Belarmino in long shot walking in a crowded street, glimpsed through the balustrade of a veranda.

=== The Interview Strand ===
The Interview Strand consists of an interview between Belarmino Fragoso and Baptista-Bastos, a journalist, writer, and at that time, film critic. We see Belarmino in a medium shot against a white background and only hear Baptista-Bastos's voice as he asks the questions. At the start of the film, Belarmino gives a garbled explanation of a scam in which the ex-boxer's brother fought under Belarmino's name in London and lost. Belarmino was then, he tells us, contracted by Jack Solomon, whom he describes as "um dos maiores empresários mundiais". Solomon had an iron grip on British boxing promotion in the 1950s, but this had waned considerably by the early 1960s. In any case, in view of the match's outcome, it seems that Belarmino was contracted to be a punchbag, not to be a contender. With little or no preparation Belarmino travels to London to fight a second-rate boxer referred to as Vic Andeeti in the interview, but whose actual name is Andretti (and who was later to manage Def Leppard), by whom he is routed within a couple of rounds. Berlarmino explains this away with accusations of unsportsmanlike conduct on Andretti's part and of connivance in his defeat on the part of the referee.

The ex-boxer then discusses his home life, the fact that his elderly mother still has to work to support herself and that he had to leave home at seventeen. Fragoso then tells the story of his immediate family, his loyal wife to whom he claims devotion, his first daughter who he had to give up for adoption and his second who almost went blind through meningitis. Belarmino goes on to recount how he started to box. In his account he was a natural champion from the start, though he does touch upon the hardships that kept him boxing when he was reluctant to do so. Here snippets of an interview with Albano Martins, the ex-boxer's former manager, are cross-cut with Belarmino's account. This is the only outside view of the ex-boxer we are given, aside from a few rumours that Baptista-Bastos relates as part of a question about the ex-boxer's current habits. Martins paints a more prosaic picture of the start to Belarmino's career, suggesting it did not have such a glorious beginning and that the main quality that impressed him in Belarmino was his capacity to take punishment in the ring.

Belarmino then criticises Albano Martins for exploiting him and there is a cut to Martins countering this with accusations of indiscipline on the ex-boxer's part and a defence of managers in general. This sets the pattern for the debate-like format adopted in this section of the film. We see the antagonistic interdependence between these two types of people involved in a sort of boss-worker relationship. Belarmino intimates that because of his illiteracy and his innumeracy he was often cheated or defrauded of his match purse. He reveals that he now has no job, but makes ends meet through biscatezinhos, his occasional work as a photo-colourist and loans from friends. He says that sometimes he goes hungry, but brushes this off saying: "muitas vezes quero jantar, não tenho, muitas vezes quero almoçar, não tenho, mas não quer dizer que seja fome. É um estado de fraqueza assim razoável." This is an assertion that is both comic and tragic in equal measure. Returning to the subject of his wife, Belarmino reaffirms his love for her but admits to having aventuras with more than a hint of pride. He then talks of his last professional fight in Portugal against a boxer called Sotta, one of his closest rivals. Belarmino won by a knockout, but earned a pittance for his trouble. We return to Albano Martins, who tells us of Belarmino's indiscipline, of his going out on the town the night before the fight against Sotta and having to undergo a drastic weight-loss regimen on the day of the weigh-in to make the grade. Martins claims Belarmino "podia ser grande", but cites his lack of discipline as the main reason behind his ultimate failure. Belarmino then recounts with evident pride how he managed to be champion of Portugal, despite the hunger and hardships he had to face, and underlines the fact that he was continually cheated due to his illiteracy and innumeracy.

A boxing match is arranged against Toni Alonso, purely for the purposes of the film. This is the first time Belarmino has fought for years, though we are not told this explicitly. Prior to the bout, Belarmino explains that he doesn't fear losing when he fights, as winning or losing are just the two sides of the sportsman's lot. Rather he fears to "fazer má figura", to perform in such a way that he feels ashamed of himself. He then goes on to criticise Portuguese boxing for being infested with leeches and hangers-on, impresarios who creamed money off the sport without constructing or contributing. From the tenor of the conversation it would seem that, for some years, there has not been professional boxing in Portugal. When asked whether he would still be able to fight at a competitive level, Belarmino demurs and discusses the conditions a boxer needs to perform to the best of his ability: good sustenance and the freedom to train and concentrate on the match. The implication is that these are absent from his own life.

After the bout against Toni Alonso, interspersed with the nightclub scenes, Belarmino tells of his relations with women, which he dismisses as being of little consequence, and shrugs off various accusations of immorality. He claims that he only started frequenting cabarets like the Ritz Clube after the end of his professional career in Portugal and mentions his desire to emigrate in order to revive his career, a possibility that seems scant. Shown in a long shot that reveals the set upon which the interview is taking place, we hear Baptista-Bastos ask Belarmino what he expects the audience's perception of him to be. Then we return to the medium shot used hitherto. Belarmino lays out his plans for the future. He says that he will become a trainer and a maker of champions "se tiver vida e saúde. Assim a vida mo permita". The last part of this wishful thinking is heard over a high-angled long shot taken through the blurred wrought-iron bars of a balcony. There is a slow rack focus that reverses the blurriness of the balustrade and the clarity of the street, leaving Belarmino indistinct in the midst of the mass of passers-by and brings the enclosing bars into focus.

== See also ==
- Docufiction
- List of docufiction films
