= Eduardo Geada =

Portuguese film director, screenwriter and professor

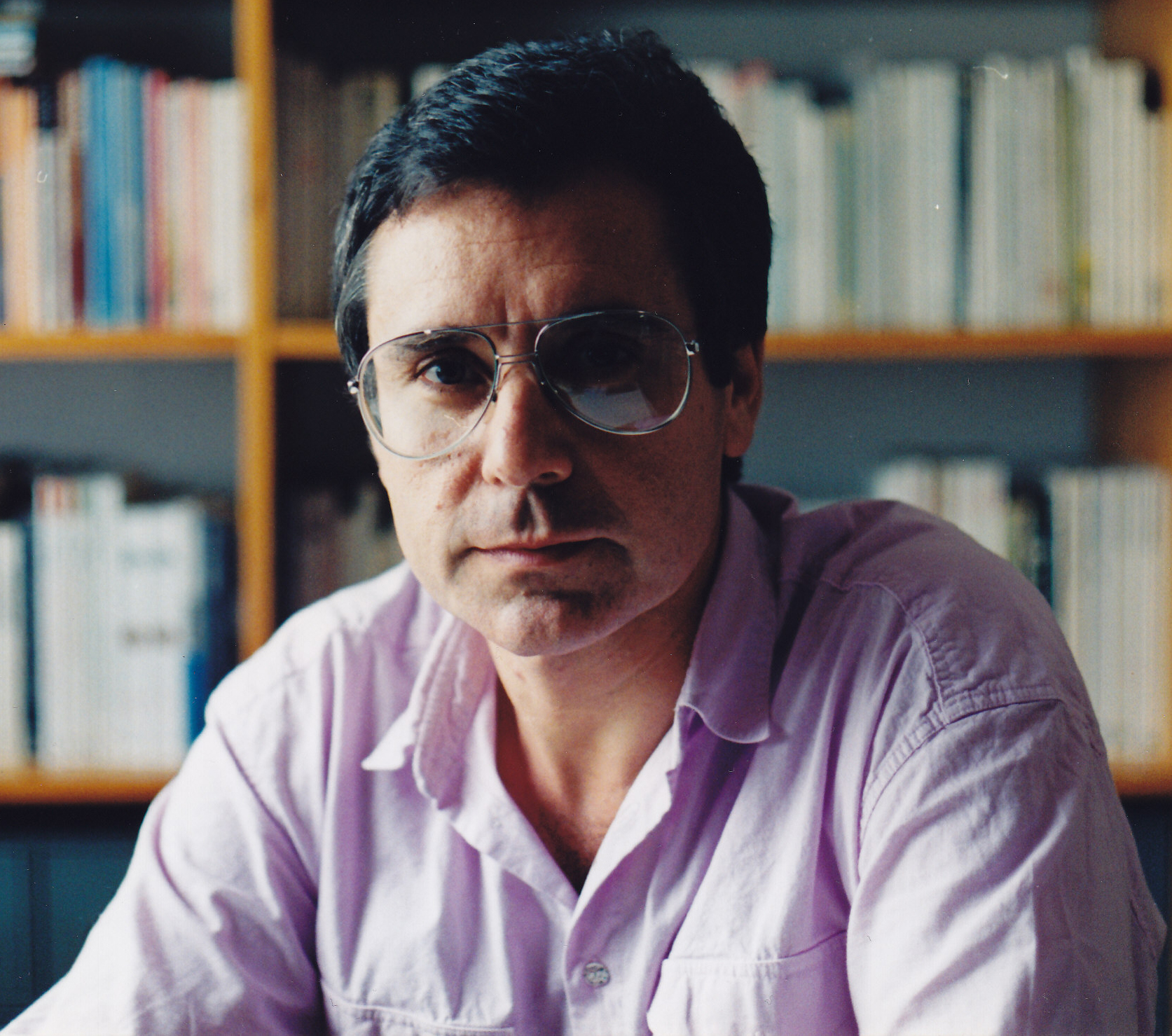
- Eduardo Geada
- Born: Eduardo Geada; May 21, 1945 (age 81); Lisbon, Portugal
- Occupations: director, writer
- Years active: 1974-present

Eduardo Geada (born May 21, 1945 in Lisbon) is a Portuguese film director, screenwriter and professor.

== Generic ==
He graduated in Anglo-American Studies at the Faculty of Arts of Lisbon University in 1976. He was active in the film club movement of the sixties, where he assimilated techniques and theories.

In 1978, as a Gulbenkian Foundation scholarship winner, he finished his specialization in Film Studies at the Slade School of Fine Arts (London College University).

He completed his Master of Arts in Media and Communication at the Universidade Nova de Lisboa (New University of Lisbon), with the thesis O Cinema Espectáculo (The Film Show, 1985). He got a Phd in Film and History of the Media, with the thesis: Os Mundos do Cinema: Modelos Dramáticos e Narrativos no Período Clássico (1997).

He was a professor at the Escola Superior de Teatro e Cinema in Lisbon (theatre and film school) from 1978 to 2004. He has been teaching at the Escola Superior de Comunicação Social (media and communication college) since 2004. He is a visiting scholar at the University of California at Berkeley (2007/2008).

Between 1968 and 1976 he worked as a film critic for magazines and newspapers : Seara Nova, Vértice, Vida Mundial, A Capital, República and Expresso. He was the author and presenter of the radio programme Moviola (1985/86), on Antena 1, dedicated to film sound-tracks.

He made a TV show on cinema and culture. Between the end of the sixties and the beginning of the seventies, Geada gave an important contribution to film criticism, submitting his ideas on cinema to enlarged discussion, and publishing several books.

From 1997 to 2002 he was the managing director to the CulturSintra Foundation (in Quinta da Regaleira, Sintra).

== Filmmaker ==
He is a film and a TV director. His first film, Sofia ou a Educação Sexual (1973), was one of the last to be censored by the old regime and shown only after the Carnation Revolution. In the film take part some of the most important representatives of Portuguese culture, such as David Mourão-Ferreira, Jorge Peixinho, Eduardo Prado Coelho. As a bébutant, João Lopes, a future well-known film journalist and critic, worked in this film as assistant director. In spite of some problems with production, the film was finished. It raised expectations that would not entirely meet director's ambitions.

After the revolution, Geada's films were allowed to be shown uncensored on television. His works Lisboa, o Direito à Cidade, A Revolução está na Ordem do Dia, and Temos Festa formed a part of the Portuguese movement cinema militante.

One of his first films was O Funeral do Patrão (1975), based on a play by the Italian playwright Dario Fo. A Santa Aliança (1977), based on a scenario by Geada himself, has the pamphlet-like structure of some other interesting post-Revolution films and was selected for the Quinzaine des Realisateurs, Cannes Film Festival. A most recent film, Passagem por Lisboa (1993), shows the memory of cinema: the film is dedicated to Félix Ribeiro and Luís de Pina, two pillars of the Portuguese Film Archive (Cinemateca Portugusesa). Mixing documentary and fiction, the film revisits Lisbon, at the beginning of the forties, with the participation of famous people, like Pola Negri, Leslie Howard, the Duke of Windsor, Primo di Rivera and the fictitious character Victor Laszlo (from Casablanca).

== Academic qualifications ==
- 1976: Degree in Anglo-American Studies from the Faculty of Letters of Lisbon University.
- 1977/78: Grant student from the Gulbenkian Foundation at the Slade School of Fine Art, where he obtained the post-graduate degree in Film Studies.
- 1984/85: Completes the M.A. in Cinema in the Department of Media Studies at the New University of Lisbon.
- 1997: PhD Thesis on Scriptwriting and Film History in the Department of Media Studies at the New University of Lisbon.
- 1978 to 2002: he has lectured at the Higher Institute of Cinema and Theatre.
- Since 2002: he has lectured at the Higher Institute of Sciences of Communication.

== Books ==
- 1977: Imperialism and Fascism in the Cinema (O Imperialismo e o Fascismo no Cinema), Moraes, Lisbon
- 1978: Cinema and Transfiguration (Cinema e Transfiguração), Horizonte, Lisbon
- 1985: The Power of the Cinema (O Poder do Cinema), Horizonte, Lisbon
- 1986: Aesthetics of the Cinema (Estéticas do Cinema - organização), Dom Quixote, Lisbon
- 1987: The Cinema Spectacle (O Cinema Espectáculo), Edições 70, Lisbon
- 1998: The Worlds of the Cinema (Os Mundos do Cinema), Editorial Notícias, Lisbon

== Writer and director ==
=== Feature films for cinema ===
- 1973: Sofia and Sexual Education (Sofia e a Educação Sexual)
- 1976: The Holy Alliance (A Santa Aliança)
- 1985: Greetings for Dona Genciana (Saudades para Dona Genciana) (after José Rodrigues Miguéis)
- 1988: Street of no return (personal assistant to Samuel Fuller)
- 1993: Passage to Lisbon (Passagem por Lisboa)

=== TV films and programmes ===
- 1974: Lisbon, the Right to the City (documentary about Lisbon)
- 1975: The Boss's Funeral (after a play by Dario Fo)
- 1976: Party Time (documentary series)
- 1978: Unavoidable Risk (cultural series with sculptor Lagoa Henriques)
- 1979: Mariana Alcoforado (after the translation by Eugénio de Andrade)
- 1982/83: Lisbon Limited Society, fictional series including:
  - The Anarchist Banker (after Fernando Pessoa)
  - The Man Who Can't Write (after Almada Negreiros)
  - A Journey in Our Own Land (after José Rodrigues Miguéis)
  - The Ritual of the Little Vampires (after José Cardoso Pires)
  - The Impossible Evasion (after Urbano Tavares Rodrigues)
  - Sunset in Areeiro (after Sttau Monteiro)
- 1986/87: The Shape of Things (cultural series)

== Arts and culture management ==
- 1996 to 2002: Arts Manager of the Cultursintra Foundation in Quinta da Regaleira, Sintra.

== Bibliographic references ==
- (in Portuguese) O Cais do Olhar by José de Matos-Cruz, Portuguese Cinematheque, 1999
