= Françoise Arnoul =

French actress (1931–2021)

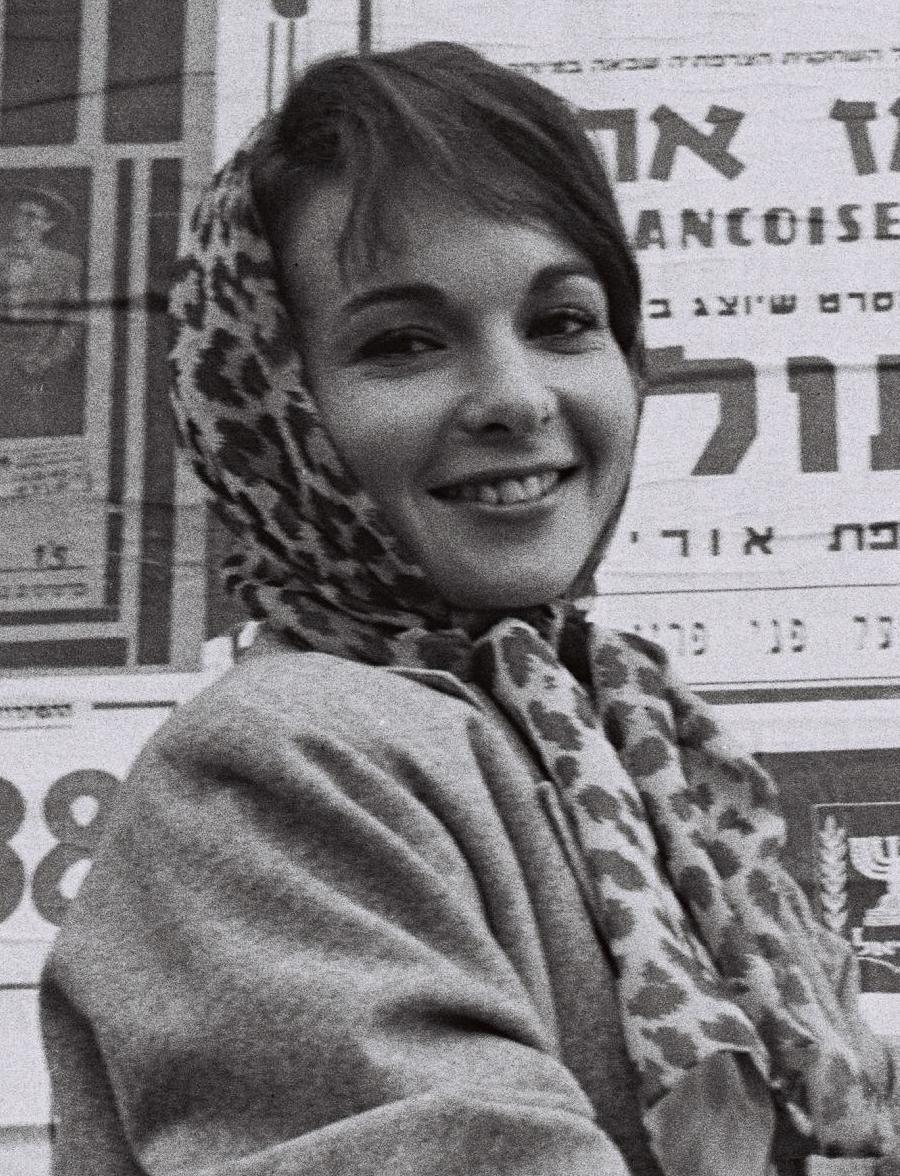
- During a visit to Jerusalem, 1958
- Born: Françoise Annette Marie Mathilde Gautsch; 3 June 1931; Constantine, French Algeria
- Died: 20 July 2021 (aged 90); Paris, France
- Occupation: Actress
- Spouse: Georges Cravenne (1956–1960; divorced)
- Partner: Bernard Paul (1964–1980; his death)

Françoise Arnoul (French pronunciation: [fʁɑ̃swaz aʁnul]; born Françoise Annette Marie Mathilde Gautsch; 3 June 1931 – 20 July 2021) was a French actress who achieved popularity during the 1950s.

== Early life ==
Born in Constantine, French Algeria, the daughter of stage actress Janine Henry and artillery general Charles Gautsch; she had two brothers. While her father continued military service in Morocco, the rest of the family moved to Paris, under the Provisional Government of the French Republic, in 1945.

== Career ==
After studying drama in Paris, she was noticed by director Willy Rozier, who offered her a major role in the film L'Épave (1949).

Arnoul starred in such films as Henri Verneuil's Forbidden Fruit (1952), Jean Renoir's French Cancan (1954), People of No Importance (1956) with Jean Gabin, Henri Decoin's The Cat (1958), Way of Youth (1959) with Bourvil, and Jean Cocteau's Testament of Orpheus (1960).

Her American film debut came in Companions of the Night (1954).

Later in life, she moved into television, appearing in various TV movies and mini-series and also turning to character parts. She published her autobiography entitled Animal doué de bonheur in 1995.

== Personal life ==
In 1956, Arnoul married publicity agent Georges Cravenne, whom she had met two years previously; they separated in 1960. From 1964 on, she became the companion of French director/scriptwriter Bernard Paul, a relationship which lasted until his death in 1980.

Arnoul died on 20 July 2021 in Paris, aged 90.

== Selected filmography ==
- The Wreck (1949)
- We Will All Go to Paris (1950)
- Quay of Grenelle (1950)
- The Red Rose (1951)
- Mammy (1951)
- Love and Desire (1951)
- The Most Beautiful Girl in the World (1951)
- Forbidden Fruit (1952)
- Farewell Paris (1952)
- Les Compagnes de la nuit (1953)
- Dortoir des grandes (1953)
- Lovers of Toledo (1953)
- La Rage au corps (1954)
- Secrets d'alcôve (1954)
- The Sheep Has Five Legs (1954)
- Storm (1954)
- French Cancan (1954)
- The Lovers of Lisbon (1955)
- Si Paris nous était conté (1956)
- People of No Importance (1956)
- Le Pays, d'où je viens (1956)
- Paris, Palace Hotel (1956)
- No Sun in Venice (1957)
- Thérèse Étienne (1958)
- White Cargo (1958)
- The Cat (1958)
- Asphalt (1959)
- Way of Youth (1959)
- Testament of Orpheus (1960)
- The Cat Shows Her Claws (1960)
- The Season for Love (1961)
- Le Diable et les dix commandements (1962)
- Portuguese Vacation (1963)
- Lucky Jo (1964)
- À couteaux tirés (1964)
- The Sleeping Car Murders (1965)
- Congress of Love (1966)
- Le dimanche de la vie (1967)
- The Little Theatre of Jean Renoir (1970) (TV)
- Spaniards in Paris (1971)
- Dialogues of Exiles (1975)
- Black-Out (1977)
- Violette et François (1977)
- Ronde de nuit (1984)
- Voir l'éléphant (1989)
- Heavy Weather (1996)
- Post Coitum, Animal Triste (1997)
- Le Cancre (2016)

== Bibliography ==
- Françoise Arnoul avec Jean-Louis Mingalon, Animal doué de bonheur, Éditions Belfond, Paris, 1995, ISBN 2-7144-3244-1.
