= Dog Day (film) =

1984 film

- Directed by: Yves Boisset
- Written by: Jean Herman; Michel Audiard; Dominique Roulet; Serge Korber; Yves Boisset
- Produced by: Norbert Saada
- Starring: Lee Marvin; Miou-Miou; Jean Carmet; Victor Lanoux; David Bennent; Bernadette Lafont; Tina Louise; Jean-Claude Dreyfus; Juliette Mills
- Cinematography: Jean Boffety
- Edited by: Albert Jurgenson; Nadine Muse
- Music by: Francis Lai
- Production companies: Cinétélé Productions; Swanie Productions; TF1 Films Production; Top n°1 Union Générale Cinématographique
- Distributed by: Union Générale Cinématographique
- Release date: 11 January 1984
- Running time: 101 minutes
- Country: France
- Languages: French; English
- Box office: $7.7 million

Dog Day (French: Canicule, lit. 'dog days') is a 1984 French action thriller film directed by Yves Boisset starring Lee Marvin. A criminal shows up at a farmhouse with the law on his heels and several million dollars in his possession. The supporting cast includes Tina Louise and Juliette Mills. The film is an adaptation of the eponymous novel by Jean Vautrin, published in 1982.

== Cast ==
- Lee Marvin as Jimmy Cobb
- Miou-Miou as Jessica
- Jean Carmet as Socrate
- Victor Lanoux as Horace
- David Bennent as Chim
- Bernadette Lafont as Ségolène
- Grace De Capitani as Lily
- Tina Louise as Noémie Blue
- Jean-Claude Dreyfus as Le Barrec
- Muni as Gusta
- Juliette Mills as Maggy
- Julien Bukowski as Rojinski
- Jean-Roger Milo as Julio
- Joseph Momo as Doudou Cadillac
- Henri Guybet as Marceau
