= Dany Carrel =

French actress (born 1932)

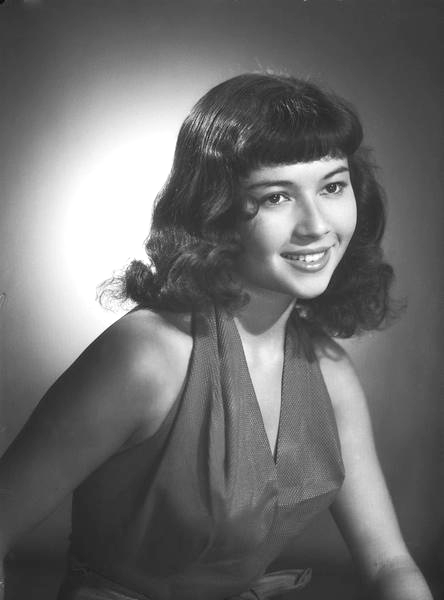
- Born: Yvonne Suzanne Chazelles du Chaxel; 20 September 1932 (age 93); Tourane, Annam, French Indochina
- Occupations: Film actress Television actress
- Years active: 1953–1989

Yvonne Suzanne Chazelles du Chaxel, better known as Dany Carrel (born 20 September 1932), is a French actress.

== Career ==
She was born in Tourane, today Đà Nẵng (Vietnam, then French Indochina) to French father Marie Yves Aimé du Chaxel, a local Customs general manager, and his Vietnamese mistress, Kam.

She shot about 50 films and TV films from the 1950s – when she quickly became famous – to the 1990s, and also played in theatre.

She gradually retired starting from the eighties due to two bouts of cancer. In 2021, she was hospitalized for three weeks after contracting COVID-19.

== Selected filmography ==
- Dortoir des grandes (1953)
- Maternite Clandestine (1953)
- Scandal in Montmartre (1955)
- Passionate Summer (1956)
- Women's Club (1956)
- People of No Importance (1956)
- Porte des Lilas (1957)
- Élisa (1957)
- Why Women Sin (1958)
- Girls for the Summer (1958)
- This Desired Body (1959)
- The Goose of Sedan (1959)
- Mill of the Stone Women (1960)
- The Hands of Orlac (1960)
- The Enemy General (1960)
- Une souris chez les hommes (1964)
- L'enfer (1964, uncompleted)
- Trap for Cinderella (1965)
- An Idiot in Paris (1967)
- A Little Virtuous (1968)
- La prisonnière (1968)
- Clérambard (1969)
- The Gates of Fire (1972)
- Trois milliards sans ascenseur (1972)
- Schools Falling Apart (1981)

== Publication ==
- Carrel, Dany; Jaubert, Marie-José (1991). L'Annamite [The Girl from Annam] (in French). Paris: éditions Robert Laffont. ISBN 978-2-221-06928-8.
