= Bernardo Santareno =

Portuguese writer

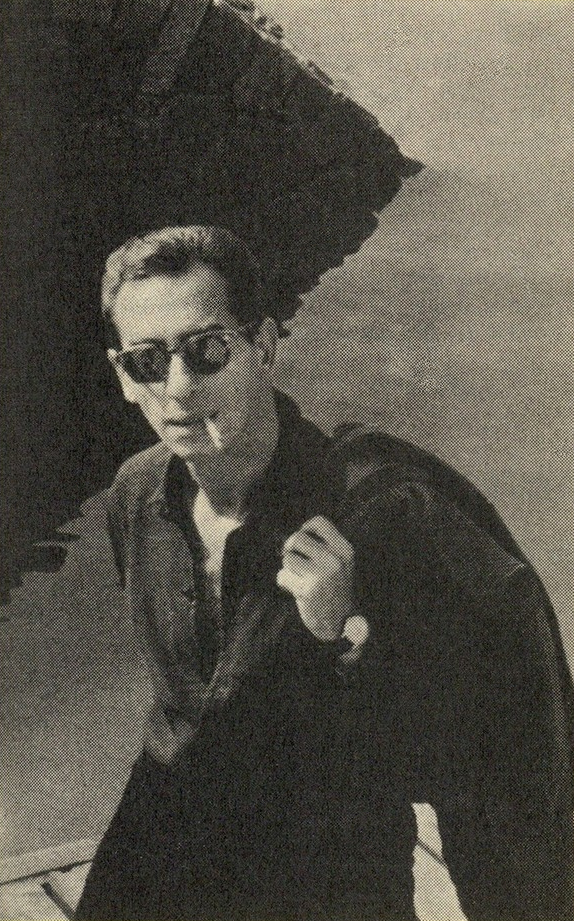
- Born: António Martinho do Rosário; November 19, 1920; Santarém, Ribatejo, Portugal
- Died: August 20, 1980 (aged 59); Oeiras, Portugal
- Education: University of Coimbra
- Occupation: Writer
- Parent(s): Joaquim Martinho do Rosário; Maria Ventura Lavareda
- Writing career
- Pen name: Bernardo Santareno

Bernardo Santareno is the pseudonym of António Martinho do Rosário (November 19, 1920 – August 20, 1980), a Portuguese writer.

== Life ==
He was born in 1920, in Santarém, Ribatejo, to Maria Ventura Lavareda and Joaquim Martinho do Rosário. He completed highschool in Santarém, at Liceu Nacional de Sá da Bandeira, in 1939. He graduated in Psychiatry from the University of Coimbra in 1950. He died aged 59 in Oeiras.

In 1957/58 he worked as an on-board physician in the Portuguese cod fishing fleet, an experience that inspired, among other writings, his sole prose effort.

His left-wing stance often put him at odds with the Estado Novo dictatorship.

Santareno left unpublished one of his most powerful plays, O Punho, which takes place during the post-revolutionary land reform (Reforma Agrária) in Alentejo.

== Work ==
His literary career begun with three poetry books published between 1954 and 1957. Subsequently, he dedicated himself to theatre, focussing on issues like human dignity, individuality and freedom, and the fight against all forms of discrimination and oppression. The first plays were quite naturalist and colloquial but, from 1966 onwards (with O Judeu, about 18th century playwright António José da Silva, persecuted and killed by the Portuguese Inquisition), developed a more brechtian and interventionist tone. As a result, some of his work would only be performed on stage after the fall of the dictatorship. In 1975 he collaborated, along with Ary dos Santos, in the text for the revue show (what is known, in Portuguese, as 'teatro de revista') P'ra Trás Mija a Burra.

Santareno, himself a "discreet homosexual", often deals with homosexuality in his plays - it has a central place in works like O pecado de João Agonia, or Vida Breve em Três Fotografias (about male prostitution) - along with multiple issues related to moral and social prejudice (adultery, virginity, the role of women in marriage, religious values, etc.).

== Bibliography ==
=== Poetry ===
- A Morte na Raiz (1954)
- Romances do Mar (1955)
- Os Olhos da Víbora (1957)

=== Prose ===
- Nos Mares do Fim do Mundo (1959)

=== Theatre ===
- A Promessa (1957)
- O Bailarino (1957)
- A Excomungada (1957)
- O Lugre (1959)
- O Crime da Aldeia Velha (1959)
- António Marinheiro ou o Édipo de Alfama (1960)
- Os Anjos e o Sangue (1961)
- O Duelo (1961)
- O Pecado de João Agonia (1961)
- Anunciação (1962)
- O Judeu (1966)
- O Inferno (1967)
- A Traição do Padre Martinho (1969)
- Português, Escritor, 45 Anos de Idade (1974)
- Os Marginais e a Revolução (comprising the plays: Restos, A Confissão, Monsanto and Vida Breve em Três Fotografias) (1979)
- O Punho (published posthumously in 1987)
