= Ursula Kübler =

Swiss dancer and actress (1928–2010)

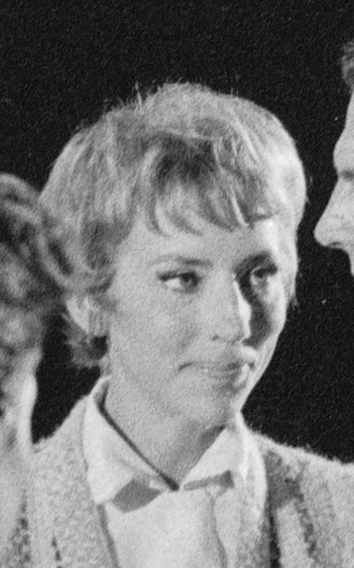
Ursula Vian-Kübler

Ursula Vian-Kübler (6 September 1928 – 18 January 2010) was a Swiss ballerina and actress.

== Biography ==
Ursula Kübler was born on 6 September 1928 in Zürich, Switzerland, to Alva Giertz and Arnold Kübler. She joined the Oper Zürich as a dancer. After a career as a dancer at the opera, she danced for Maurice Béjart, before becoming a company member at the Paris Opera Ballet.

After retiring from ballet, Kübler worked as a film, stage, and television actress.

She met Boris Vian at a cocktail party at Gallimard in 1950, and the two started an affair. Vian later divorced his wife, and Kübler married him on 8 February 1954. In 1963, she founded the Boris Vian Association, which was renamed the Boris Vian Foundation in 1981.

In 1971, she signed the Manifesto of the 343, a petition created as an act of civil disobedience arguing for the legalization of abortion in France.

She died on 18 January 2010 in Eus, France.
