= Fernando Lopes (filmmaker) =

Portuguese film director (1935–2012)

- Born: 28 December 1935; Maçãs de Dona Maria, Alvaiázere, Leiria, Portugal
- Died: 2 May 2012 (aged 76); Lisbon, Portugal
- Occupation: Film director
- Movement: Novo Cinema Português

Fernando Lopes, GCIH (28 December 1935 – 2 May 2012) was a Portuguese film director. He was a Film teacher at the Portuguese National Conservatory, nowadays the Lisbon Theatre and Film School (Escola Superior de Teatro e Cinema). He died, aged 76, in Lisbon due to throat cancer.

== Filmography ==
- Pedras e o Tempo, As (1961)
- Voo da Amizade, O (1962)
- Palavras e os Fios, As (1962)
- Rota do Progresso (1964)
- Belarmino (1964)
- Se Deus Quiser (1966)
- Cruzeiro do Sul (1966)
- Hoje à Estreia (1967)
- Tejo na Rota do Progresso (1967)
- Vermelho, Amarelo e Verde (1969)
- Nacionalidade: Português (1972)
- A Aventura Calculada (1972)
- Era Uma Vez... Amanhã (1972)
- Uma Abelha na Chuva (1972)
- Encoberto, O (1975)
- Cantigamente (1 episode, 1976)
- Nós por cá Todos Bem (1978)
- Lisboa (1979) (TV)
- Crónica dos Bons Malandros (1984)
- Matar Saudades (1988)
- Fio do Horizonte, O (1993)
- Gérard, Fotógrafo (1998) (TV)
- Cinema (2001)
- Delfim, O (2002) aka Dauphin, Le (France)
- Lá Fora (2004)
- 98 Octanas (2006)
