= Pierre Kast =

French film director and screenwriter

- Born: Pierre Kast; September 22, 1920; Paris, France
- Died: October 20, 1984 (aged 64); In mid-air over France (during repatriation from Rome)
- Education: Lycée Henri IV, University of Paris
- Occupations: Film director; film critic; screenwriter; novelist
- Known for: Work on the French New Wave and Left Bank cinema

Pierre Kast (22 September 1920 – 20 October 1984) was a French film director, film critic, screenwriter, and novelist. He was a contributor to Cahiers du cinéma from its founding in 1951 and his feature films ranged from witty studies of bourgeois sexual politics to politically inflected science fiction. A former French Resistance fighter, he remained engaged with left-wing politics throughout his life and published several novels alongside his film work.

== Biography ==
=== Early life and the Resistance ===
Kast was born in Paris on 22 September 1920 into a Protestant bourgeois family. He attended the Lycée Henri IV before studying literature at the Sorbonne. During the German occupation of France, he became active in the French Resistance as a member of the Communist Students of Paris, serving as a student leader of the Young Communists. He was one of the organisers of the demonstration of 11 November 1940 in the Latin Quarter against the occupation. Arrested shortly afterwards, he was held at La Santé Prison for five months before going underground. He co-founded the Union of Patriotic Students in 1943 at the instigation of the clandestine French Communist Party, and evaded police searches for four years while participating in armed resistance groups operating in Paris.

=== Career ===
After the Liberation, Kast founded the University Film Club in 1945 and worked as an assistant to Henri Langlois at the Cinémathèque Française. He began writing film criticism for Action and for Le Patriote Résistant, a magazine published by the National Federation of Deported and Interned Resistance Fighters. Alongside the writer Boris Vian and the novelist Raymond Queneau, he co-founded the Club des Savanturiers on 26 December 1951, a discussion group dedicated to American science fiction.

He was a contributor to Cahiers du cinéma from its first issue in 1951 and wrote regularly for the journal throughout the decade. His criticism focused on mise-en-scène as the locus of directorial authorship, and he was among the earliest French critics to champion American genre directors such as Robert Aldrich. He was also an early voice on the question of women's representation in the film industry; in issue no. 30 of Cahiers, he published an essay attacking the systematic exclusion of women from directing.

Concurrently with his critical work, Kast built a career as an assistant director, working with Jean Grémillon on Pattes blanches (1949) and L'Étrange Madame X (1951), with René Clément on Jeux interdits (1952), with Jean Renoir on French Cancan (1955), and with Preston Sturges on The Diary of Major Thompson (1955). With Grémillon, he also co-directed the short film Les Charmes de l'existence (1949). He was a co-signatory of the Groupe des Trente manifesto advocating for short filmmaking in France, and directed a number of acclaimed shorts during the 1950s, including Les Désastres de la guerre (1951) and architectural documentaries on Claude-Nicolas Ledoux and Le Corbusier.

His first feature film was the fantasy comedy Un amour de poche (1957). His subsequent features pursued two distinct veins: literate examinations of romantic and sexual relationships among the bourgeoisie — a mode sometimes described as marivaudage — and politically inflected science fiction. Le Bel Âge (1960), co-written with fellow Cahiers critic Jacques Doniol-Valcroze, was an episodic exploration of sexual relationships. Vacances portugaises (1963) followed a group of wealthy friends as their romantic illusions collapsed over a weekend in Portugal. Les Soleils de l'Île de Pâques (1972) was a mystical science fiction film in which six individuals across the globe receive telepathic transmissions drawing them to Easter Island. La Guérilléra (1982) was a historical drama centred on armed resistance and political violence. Though often grouped with the French New Wave, his literary sensibility and political commitments also placed him in proximity to the Left Bank filmmakers.

Kast was also a novelist. His works include Les Vampires de l'Alfama (1975), set in eighteenth-century Portugal during the rule of the Marquis of Pombal, which used vampire fiction as an allegory for political and sexual oppression.

From the late 1960s he found it increasingly difficult to finance the original projects he favoured. His final film, L'Herbe rouge (1985), was a television adaptation of the novel by Boris Vian. On 20 October 1984, having been injured in an accident on a set at Cinecittà in Rome, Kast died of a cardiac arrest during his medical repatriation by air to Paris. He was 64. His death occurred one day before that of François Truffaut.

== Filmography ==
=== As director ===
==== Feature films ====
Year	Original title	Notes
1957	Un amour de poche	
1960	Le Bel Âge	Also co-writer with Jacques Doniol-Valcroze
1961	The Season for Love	
1963	Thank You, Natercia	Also co-writer with Peter Oser
1963	Vacances portugaises	Also co-writer with Alain Aptekman, Jacques Doniol-Valcroze, and Robert Scipion
1964	Le Grain de sable	Also co-writer with Alain Aptekman
1966	Carnets brésiliens	Television documentary
1966	La Naissance de l'Empire romain	Television documentary; co-directed with Jean Chérasse
1966	Vendredi noir	Television documentary
1966	Marguerite Yourcenar	Television documentary portrait for Vocation series
1968	Bandeira Branca de Oxalá	Documentary; also co-writer with Jean-Gabriel Albicocco
1968	Drôle de jeu	Co-directed with Jean-Daniel Pollet
1972	Les Soleils de l'Île de Pâques	
1976	A Nudez de Alexandra	
1980	Le Soleil en face	Also co-writer with Alain Aptekman
1982	La Guérilléra	Also co-writer with Antonio Tarruella
1982	Le Jour le plus court	Television film
1985	L'Herbe rouge	Television film

==== Short films and documentaries ====
Year	Original title	Notes
1949	Les Charmes de l'existence	Co-directed with Jean Grémillon
1951	Les Femmes du Louvre	Documentary
1951	Arithmétique	Short featuring co-writer Raymond Queneau
1951	Les Désastres de la guerre	
1952	Je sème à tous vents	Also co-writer with François Chalais
1953	Paris, nous voici !	
1954	Monsieur Robida, prophète et explorateur du temps	Co-directed with Jacques Doniol-Valcroze
1954	L'Architecte maudit: Claude-Nicolas Ledoux	Documentary
1957	Le Corbusier, l'architecte du bonheur	Documentary
1959	Images pour Baudelaire	
1959	Des ruines et des hommes	Co-directed and co-written with Marcelle Lioret
1960	Une question d'assurance	
1962	PXO	Documentary
1965	La Brûlure de mille soleils	Also co-writer with Eduard Luis

=== As screenwriter only ===
Year	Title	Director
1955	The Red Cloak	Giuseppe Maria Scotese
1965	A Bullet Through the Heart	Jean-Daniel Pollet
1970	Le Maître du temps (The Master of Time)	Jean-Daniel Pollet
1971	Le Crépuscule (Early Morning)	Jean-Gabriel Albicocco
1974	The Irony of Chance	Édouard Molinaro

=== As assistant director ===
Year	Title	Director	Notes
1949	White Paws	Jean Grémillon	
1951	The Glass Castle	René Clément	
1951	The Strange Madame X	Jean Grémillon	
1952	Forbidden Games	René Clément	Uncredited
1955	French Cancan	Jean Renoir	
1955	The French, They Are a Funny Race	Preston Sturges	

== Selected publications ==
- Jean Gremillon (1960)
- Les Vampires de l'Alfama (1975)
- Le Bonheur ou le pouvoir (1980)
- La Jointure du genou (1981)
