= François de Roubaix =

French film score composer

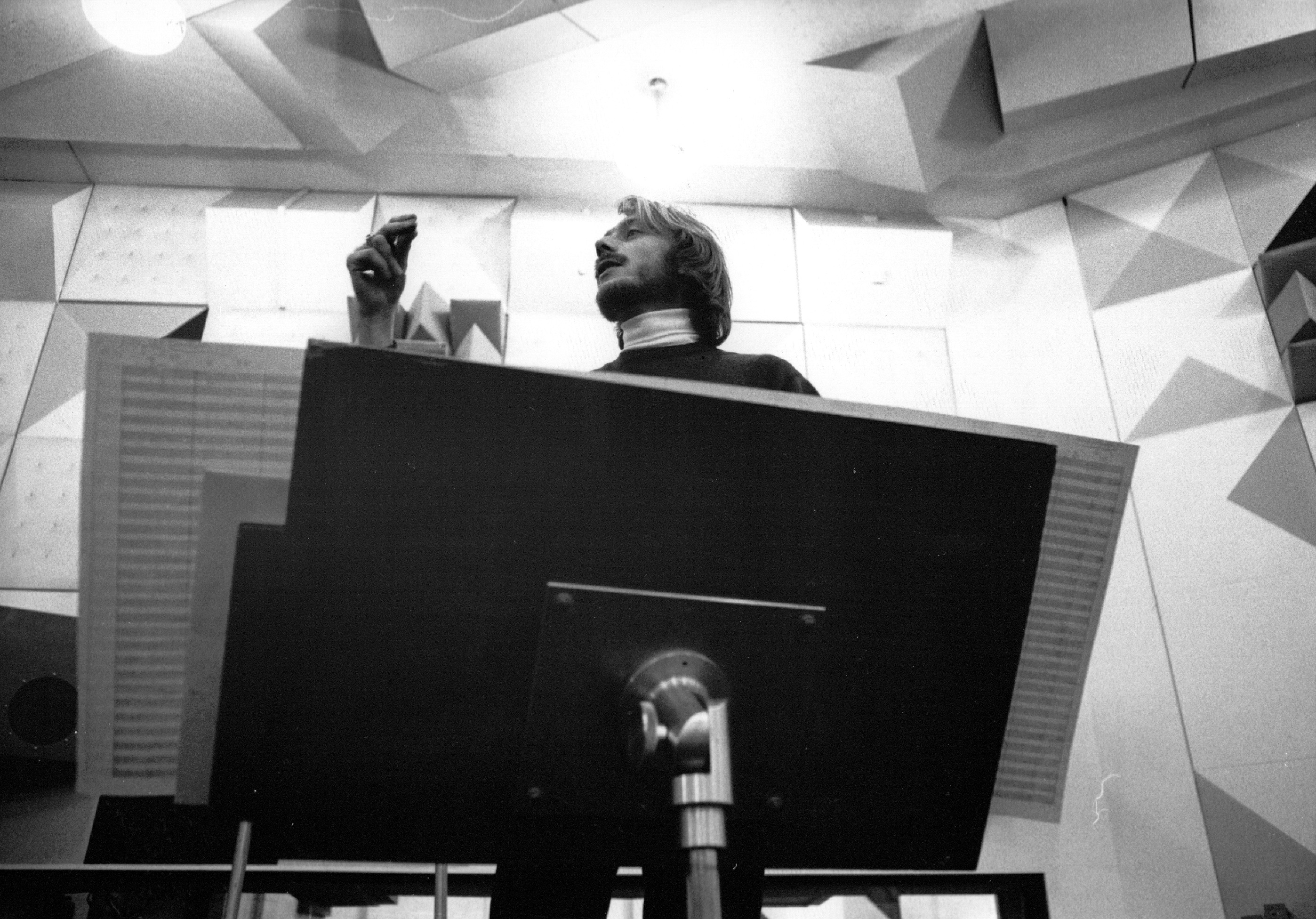
- François de Roubaix conducting an orchestra.
- Born: François de Roubaix; 3 April 1939; Neuilly-sur-Seine, France
- Died: 22 November 1975 (aged 36); Tenerife, Spain
- Height: 1.88 m (6 ft 2 in)
- Musical career
- Genres: Film music; absolute music; jazz; pop; rock
- Occupations: Composer; musician; conductor; multi-instrumentalist
- Instruments: Piano; drums; trombone; guitar; synth
- Years active: 1961-1975
- Website: https://www.francoisderoubaix.com/

François de Roubaix (French pronunciation: [fʁɑ̃swa də ʁube]; 3 April 1939, Neuilly-sur-Seine, Hauts-de-Seine – 22 November 1975, Tenerife, Canary Islands) was a French film score composer. In a decade, he created a musical style with new sounds, until his death in 1975.

== Biography ==
Roubaix did not receive any formal education in music, but began studying jazz on his own at age 15, forming a band and learning trombone as an autodidact. His father, the Oscar-winning filmmaker Paul de Roubaix, who was a producer of the short film, "An Occurrence at Owl Creek Bridge" and the creator of educational films, offered to let François compose scores for the latter. François' first film score was for a 1961 film by Robert Enrico; through the late 1960s and early 1970s he scored films for Enrico, Jose Giovanni, Jean-Pierre Melville, Jean-Pierre Mocky, and Yves Boisset.

Notable in his style is his use of folk elements, as well as electronic musical instruments such as synthesizers and early drum machines. He is thus seen as a precursor of French electronic music. Roubaix had a home studio where he would overdub parts until he was satisfied with the result. He died in 1975 in a diving accident. In 1976, his score for Le Vieux Fusil was awarded a César Award.

== Scores ==
- 1961 : Thaumeatopoea, la vie des chenilles processionnaires du pin et de leur extermination controlée by Robert Enrico
- 1962 : Montagnes magiques by Robert Enrico
- 1964 : Contre-point by Robert Enrico
- 1964 : Strip-teaseuses ou ces femmes que l'on croit faciles by Jean-Claude Roy
- 1965 : Théâtre de la jeunesse : La redevance du fantôme (TV) by Robert Enrico
- 1965 : Les Survivants (TV series) by Dominique Genée
- 1966 : Les Chats by Philippe Durand
- 1966 : Elles by Alain Magrou
- 1966 : Les Combinards by Jean-Claude Roy
- 1966 : Les Grandes Gueules by Robert Enrico
- 1967 : La loi du survivant by José Giovanni
- 1967 : Les Poneyttes by Joel Lemoigne
- 1967 : Contacts by Dolorès Grassian
- 1967 : Des terrils et des Turcs by Jean-Michel Barjol
- 1967 : Les aventuriers by Robert Enrico
- 1967 : Rue barrée (TV series) by René Versini
- 1967 : La vie commence à minuit (TV series) by Yvan Jouannet
- 1967 : Les Chevaliers du ciel or Les Aventures de Michel Tanguy - Les aventures de Tanguy et Laverdure (TV series) by François Villiers
- 1967 : The Blonde from Peking by Nicolas Gessner
- 1967 : Le Samouraï by Jean-Pierre Melville
- 1967 : Diaboliquement vôtre by Julien Duvivier
- 1968 : Le Paradis terrestre (TV series)
- 1968 : Tante Zita by Robert Enrico
- 1968 : Le Rapace by José Giovanni
- 1968 : Les Teenagers by Pierre Roustang
- 1968 : Les Secrets de la Mer Rouge (TV series) by Pierre Lary
- 1968 : Adieu l'ami by Jean Herman
- 1968 : Ho! by Robert Enrico
- 1968 : La Grande Lessive by Jean-Pierre Mocky
- 1968 : Le Témoin by Anne Walter
- 1969 : Pépin la bulle (TV series) by Italo Bettiol, Stefano Lonati
- 1969 : Les Oiseaux sauvages (TV series)
- 1969 : Jeff by Jean Herman
- 1969 : 48 heures d'amour by Cécil Saint-Laurent
- 1969 : Que ferait donc Faber ? (TV series) by Dolorès Grassian
- 1969 : Les Étrangers by Jean-Pierre Desagnat
- 1970 : Les Amis by Gérard Blain
- 1970 : Une infinie tendresse by Pierre Jallaud
- 1970 : L'Étalon by Jean-Pierre Mocky
- 1970 : Dernier domicile connu by José Giovanni
- 1970 : Pour un sourire by François Dupont-Midy
- 1970 : La Peau de Torpedo by Jean Delannoy
- 1970 : Teva : Opération Gauguin (TV series) by Adolphe Sylvain
- 1970 : L'homme orchestre by Serge Korber
- 1970 : Les Novices by Guy Casaril
- 1971 : Girl Slaves of Morgana Le Fay by Bruno Gantillon
- 1971 : Daughters of Darkness (Les Lèvres rouges) by Harry Kümel
- 1971 : Où est donc passé Tom ? by José Giovanni
- 1971 : Un peu, beaucoup, passionnément by Robert Enrico
- 1971 : Boulevard du Rhum by Robert Enrico
- 1972 : La Scoumoune by José Giovanni
- 1974 : Chapi Chapo (TV series)
- 1975 : Le Vieux Fusil by Robert Enrico
