= Le deuxième souffle =

Le deuxième souffle may refer to:

- Le deuxième souffle (novel), a 1958 novel by José Giovanni
- Le deuxième souffle (1966 film), directed by Jean-Pierre Melville
- Le deuxième souffle, a 1987 documentary film by Phil Comeau
- Le deuxième souffle (2007 film), Alain Corneau's remake of the 1966 film
