= Jean Keraudy =

French actor (1920–2001)

Jean Keraudy (1920–2001) was the stage name of Roland Barbat, a French prisoner, later came to fame playing himself in the French film The Hole (French: Le Trou). He was one of five inmates involved in a 1947 escape attempt from France's La Santé Prison.

He served as the inspiration for the character of Roland Darbant in José Giovanni's 1957 novel The Break (French: Le Trou). The two met while cellmates at La Santé.

== Life ==
Barbat was born on 20 April 1920 in Boulogne-Billancourt the son of a blacksmith. He originally trained as a mechanic.

During the Second World War he was in German-occupied France and started breaking into (German-controlled) local town halls to steal ration books and identity papers. He was first caught (stealing bread ration tickets) in 1941. However, he acquired a knack for escape and following repeated imprisonments earned the nickname of the "King of Escape".

In 1943 he joined the Maquisards in the Châteauroux area and was imprisoned there. He then robbed the St Brieuc supply train. On capture he received a nine-year prison sentence and ended in the ironically named Liberation Prison. Moving to the Prison Le Sante he made his most spectacular escape in 1946. Returning to Le Sante he made his final infamous escape in 1947 with three fellow cell-mates (including the future author, Joseph Damiani alias José Giovanni). It was this escape which inspired the book "Le Trou".

His final release came in 1956 following some years in the Central Prison of Melun.

In the 1960 film production of Le Trou (The Hole), director Jacques Becker cast Barbat to play Darbant. He agreed to do this under the pseudonym of Jean Keraudy, to disguise his identity.

He went on to host a game show, "Le Tirlipote", on Radio Luxembourg.

He died on 1 October 2001 in Cravent.

Two further films, Les Aventuriers (1967) and the documentary Roland (1994) are based on his life.
