= Alain Mottet =

French actor

Alain Mottet (30 December 1928 – 31 October 2017) was a French actor. He appeared in many films and on television, usually in a supporting role. He also acted in numerous stage productions.

== Early life and education ==
Alain Mottet was born on 30 December 1928 in Lyon, France.

== Career ==
Mottet appeared in dozens of films, often in secondary roles. He appeared in three films with José Giovanni. In 1965, he played the main role in L'Affaire de la malle à Gouffé. In 1969, in L'Armée des ombres, he was responsible for the prison camp where Lino Ventura, alias Philippe Gerbier, was imprisoned.

For television, he played Flambart, the police officer who chased Eugène François Vidocq relentlessly, played by Bernard Noël in the TV series Vidocq in 1967. He regularly worked with director Abder Isker, including on several episodes of Au théâtre ce soir. One of his most notable TV roles was as Shazénian in the fairytale Shéhérazade, shown at the end of 1971: on a flying horse, he walks with Claude Jade into the night sky.

In parallel to his screen career, he also continued to work on stage, most notably in plays by Jean Le Poulain, Roger Planchon, André Barsacq and Georges Wilson. He was part of the cast of the Comédie-Française from 1986 to 1988.

== Death ==
Mottet died on 31 October 2017 in Paris.

== Personal life ==
Married to Françoise Hirsch (1930-2017), until his death on 31 October 2017, he is the father of Christine Mottet and actor and musician Pierre Mottet.

== Theatre ==
- 1950 : Bottines et collets montés by Eugène Labiche and Georges Courteline, directed by Roger Planchon, théâtre de la Comédie de Lyon
- 1950 : Faust Hamlet by Thomas Kyd and Christopher Marlowe, directed by Roger Planchon, théâtre de la Comédie de Lyon
- 1951 : Twelfth Night by William Shakespeare, directed by Roger Planchon, théâtre de la Comédie de Lyon
- 1952 : The Merry Wives of Windsor by William Shakespeare, directed by Roger Planchon, théâtre de la Comédie de Lyon
- 1952 : Life Is a Dream by Pedro Calderón de la Barca, directed by Roger Planchon, théâtre de la Comédie de Lyon
- 1952 : Claire by René Char, directed by Roger Planchon, théâtre de la Comédie de Lyon
- 1953 : La Découverte du nouveau monde by Felix Lope de Vega, directed by Hubert Gignoux, Théâtre National de Bretagne
- 1953 : L'Archipel Lenoir by Armand Salacrou, directed by Hubert Gignoux, Théâtre National de Bretagne
- 1953 : Knock ou le Triomphe de la médecine by Jules Romains, directed by Hubert Gignoux, Théâtre National de Bretagne
- 1954 : Le Voyageur sans bagage by Jean Anouilh, directed by Hubert Gignoux, Théâtre National de Bretagne
- 1954 : Le Marchand de Venise by William Shakespeare, directed by Hubert Gignoux, Théâtre National de Bretagne
- 1955 : The Merry Wives of Windsor by William Shakespeare, directed by André Steigner, festival de Bellac
- 1955 : La Mort joyeuse by Nikolai Evreinov, directed by André Steigner, festival de Bellac
- 1955 : Mariana Pineda by Federico García Lorca, directed by André Steigner, festival de Bellac
- 1956 : L'Impromptu de l'Alma by Eugène Ionesco, directed by Maurice Jacquemont, Théâtre des Champs-Élysées
- 1956 : Les Chaises by Eugène Ionesco, directed by Jacques Mauclair, Théâtre des Champs-Élysées, théâtre des Célestins
- 1957 : Les Coréens by Michel Vinaver, directed by Jean-Marie Serreau, Alliance Française
- 1957-1958 : Paolo Paoli by Arthur Adamov, directed by Roger Planchon, théâtre de la Comédie de Lyon and théâtre du Vieux-Colombier
- 1958 : Procès à Jésus by Diego Fabbri, directed by Marcelle Tassencourt, théâtre Hébertot
- 1959 : Les Possédés by Albert Camus after Fiodor Dostoïevski, directed by Albert Camus, théâtre Antoine
- 1960 : Dead Souls by Nikolai Gogol, directed by Roger Planchon, Théâtre de la Cité de Villeurbanne, Odéon-Théâtre de l'Europe
- 1960 : Les Chaises by Eugène Ionesco, directed by Jacques Mauclair, Théâtre des Champs-Élysées
- 1960 : Christobal de Lugo by Loys Masson, directed by Bernard Jenny, théâtre du Vieux-Colombier
- 1960 : Le Signe du feu by Diego Fabbri, directed by Marcelle Tassencourt, théâtre Hébertot
- 1961 : Twelfth Night by William Shakespeare, directed by Jean Le Poulain, théâtre du Vieux-Colombier
- 1961-1962 : Le Christ recrucifié by Nikos Kazantzakis, directed by Marcelle Tassencourt, théâtre Montansier and Odéon-Théâtre de l'Europe
- 1962-1963 : Victor ou les Enfants au pouvoir by Roger Vitrac, directed by Jean Anouilh and Roland Piétri, théâtre de l'Ambigu and théâtre de l'Athénée
- 1963 : Andromaque by Racine, directed by Marcelle Tassencourt, théâtre Montparnasse
- 1963 : Le Vicaire by Rolf Hochhuth, directed by François Darbon, théâtre de l'Athénée
- 1965 : Ce soir on improvise by Luigi Pirandello, directed by André Barsacq, théâtre de l'Atelier
- 1966 : La Promenade du dimanche by Georges Michel, directed by Maurice Jacquemont, Georges Michel, studio des Champs-Élysées
- 1967 : Le Duel by Anton Tchekov, directed by André Barsacq, théâtre de l'Atelier
- 1967 : Opéra pour un tyran by Henri-François Rey, directed by André Barsacq, théâtre de l'Atelier
- 1967 : Le Triomphe de la sensibilité by Goethe, directed by Jorge Lavelli, festival d'Avignon
- 1968 : The Mother by Bertolt Brecht, directed by Jacques Rosner, TNP Théâtre national de Chaillot
- 1969 : Jules César by William Shakespeare, directed by Jean Deschamps, festival de la Cité (Carcassonne)
- 1968 : The Devil and the Good Lord by Jean-Paul Sartre, directed by Georges Wilson, TNP Théâtre national de Chaillot
- 1969 : Le Bossu by Paul Féval, directed by Jean Deschamps, festival de la Cité (Carcassonne)
- 1970 : The Devil and the Good Lord by Jean-Paul Sartre, directed by Georges Wilson, TNP festival d'Avignon
- 1970 : Opérette by Witold Gombrowicz, directed by Jacques Rosner, TNP Théâtre national de Chaillot
- 1971 : Henri VIII by William Shakespeare, directed by Gabriel Garran, théâtre de la Commune
- 1972 : Macbett by Eugène Ionesco, directed by Jacques Mauclair, Alliance Française
- 1972 : Honni soit qui mal y pense by Peter Barnes, directed by Stuart Burge, théâtre de Paris
- 1973-1974 : Madame Sans-Gêne by Victorien Sardou and Émile Moreau, directed by Michel Roux, théâtre de Paris and théâtre Marigny : Joseph Fouché
- 1974 : Croque-monsieur by Marcel Mithois, directed by Jean-Pierre Grenier, théâtre Saint-Georges
- 1974 : Le Siècle des lumières by Claude Brulé, directed by Jean-Laurent Cochet, théâtre du Palais Royal
- 1976 : Lucienne et le Boucher by Marcel Aymé, directed by Nicole Anouilh, théâtre Saint-Georges
- 1978 : Miam-miam ou le Dîner d'affaires by Jacques Deval, directed by Jean Le Poulain, théâtre Marigny
- 1980 : Une drôle de vie by Brian Clark, directed by Michel Fagadau, Théâtre Antoine
- 1981 : Outrages aux bonnes mœurs by Eric Westphal, directed by Jean-Louis Martin Barbaz, théâtre Hébertot
- 1981 : Petit déjeuner chez Desdémone by Janusz Krasinski, directed by Jaroslav Vizner, Carré Silvia-Monfort
- 1984 : Le Passeport by Pierre Bourgeade, directed by Bruno Carlucci, théâtre de l'Athénée-Louis-Jouvet
- 1987 : Polyeucte by Corneille, directed by Jorge Lavelli, Comédie-Française
- 1987 : Esther by Racine, directed by Françoise Seigner, Comédie-Française at the Odéon-Théâtre de l'Europe, and théâtre de la Porte-Saint-Martin
- 1987 : Une sorte d'Alaska by Harold Pinter, directed by Bernard Murat, Comédie-Française at the Festival d'Avignon, and théâtre Montparnasse
- 1988 : Le Véritable Saint-Genest, comédien et martyr by Jean de Rotrou, directed by André Steiger, Comédie-Française
- 1988 : À ta santé, Dorothée by Rémo Forlani, directed by Jacques Seiler, théâtre de la Renaissance
- 1989 : Point de feu sans fumée by Julien Vartet, directed by Jean-Paul Tribout, théâtre Édouard VII
- 1990 : La Dame de chez Maxim by Georges Feydeau, directed by Alain Françon, théâtre du Huitième-Lyon
- 1998 : Alfred aime O'Keeffe by Lanie Robertson, directed by Georges Werler, théâtre Silvia-Monfort
- 2007 : Chemin du ciel (Himmelweg) by Juan Mayorga, directed by Jorge Lavelli, théâtre de la Tempête

== Filmography ==
=== Cinema ===
- 1962: Climats (by Stellio Lorenzi)
- 1962: Le Pèlerin perdu (Short, by Guy Jorré) - Le pèlerin
- 1963: Le Feu follet (by Louis Malle) - Urcel
- 1967: Le Dimanche de la vie (by Jean Herman)
- 1968: Ho! (by Robert Enrico) - Paul
- 1969: L'Armée des ombres (by Jean-Pierre Melville) - Commander of the camp
- 1969: Une veuve en or (by Michel Audiard) - Le notaire (uncredited)
- 1969: Dernier domicile connu (by José Giovanni) - Frank Lambert
- 1970: Un aller simple (by José Giovanni) - Nitesse
- 1972: La Scoumoune (by José Giovanni) - Ficelle
- 1973: Le viol (by Jean Dasque)
- 1976: The Good and the Bad (by Claude Lelouch) - Le commissaire Blanchot
- 1977: La Nuit de Saint-Germain-des-Prés (by Bob Swaim) - Marc Ovet
- 1978: L'Amour en question (by André Cayatte) - L'avocat général
- 1978: Le Point douloureux (by Marc Bourgeois) - Le directeur
- 1980: Inspecteur la Bavure (by Claude Zidi) - Dumeze - le directeur de la police
- 1982: Un dimanche de flic (by Michel Vianey) - Director
- 1990: My New Partner II (by Claude Zidi) - Le préfet
- 2001: Aram (by Robert Kechichian) - Miran Sarkissian

=== Television ===
- 1962: Paludi (by Diego Fabbri) (telefilm by Gilbert Pineau) - Alf
- 1964: Les Indes noires (by Marcel Bluwal) - James Starr
- 1965: Belphégor ou le Fantôme du Louvre (TV show by Claude Barma)
- 1965: Donadieu (by Stellio Lorenzi) - Berthelien
- 1966: L'Écharpe (telefilm by Abder Isker) - Édouard Tranier
- 1966: Les Compagnons de Jéhu (miniseries) - Toussaint
- 1967: L'Affaire Lourdes (by Marcel Bluwal)
- 1967: Vidocq (13 episodes) - Flambart
- 1970: À corps perdu (telefilm by Abder Isker) - Victor Colonna
- 1971: Shéhérazade (telefilm by Pierre Badel) - Shazénian
- 1971: Les Salauds vont en enfer (telefilm by Abder Isker) - Hal
- 1972: La Mort d'un champion telefilm by Abder Isker : Denis Clément
- 1972: Les Six Hommes en question (by Abder Isker)
- 1972: Les Misérables (by Marcel Bluwal) - Thénardier
- 1973: Les Coqs de minuit (miniseries, FR3) (by Édouard Logereau) - Maître Régis
- 1974: La Passagère by Abder Isker : le commissaire Clément
- 1974: Les Cinq Dernières Minutes (by Claude Loursais, Episode: "Fausses Notes") - Igor Cléry
- 1974: Au théâtre ce soir (Madame Sans-Gêne) (by Victorien Sardou and Émile Moreau, director Michel Roux, Georges Folgoas, théâtre Marigny : Joseph Fouché)
- 1974: La Main enchantée (by Michel Subiela) - maître Chevassut
- 1975: Les Grands Détectives (by Jean Herman, Episode: "Monsieur Lecoq") - le duc Sairmeuse
- 1976 : Domino (by Marcel Achard) (with Jean Piat)
- 1976: Au théâtre ce soir (La Frousse) (by Julien Vartet, director René Clermont, Pierre Sabbagh, théâtre Édouard VII)
- 1977: Dossier Danger Immédiat (by Claude Barma, Episode: "L'Affaire Martine Desclos")
- 1977: Dernier Appel (by Abder Isker)
- 1977: Attention chien méchant (by Bernard-Roland)
- 1978: Au théâtre ce soir (Episode: "Miam-miam ou le Dîner d'affaires", by Jacques Deval, director Jean Le Poulain, Pierre Sabbagh, théâtre Marigny)
- 1978: Les Amours sous la Révolution (Episode: "Les Amants de Thermidor", by Jean-Paul Carrère)
- 1979: La Belle Vie (by Jean Anouilh, directed by Lazare Iglesis) - le commissaire du peuple
- 1979: Messieurs les jurés (Episode: "L'Affaire Coublanc", by Dominique Giuliani) - le Président
- 1980: Les Cinq Dernières Minutes (Jean-Yves Jeudy, Episode: "Un parfum d'Angélique")
- 1986: Léon Blum à l'échelle humaine (Pierre Bourgeade and Jacques Rutman) - Léon Blum
- 1987: Les Enquêtes du commissaire Maigret (Episode: "Maigret chez le ministre", by Louis Grospierre) - Mascoulin
- 1989: Le Grand Secret (by Jacques Trébouta)
- 1991: Marie Curie, une femme honorable (by Michel Boisrond)
- 2010: L'Appel du 18 juin (by Félix Olivier) - maréchal Pétain
- 2010: Les Châtaigniers du désert (by Caroline Huppert) - le marquis (final appearance)
