= The Common Man (film) =

1975 film

- Film poster
- Directed by: Yves Boisset
- Written by: Yves Boisset; Jean-Pierre Bastid
- Produced by: Gisèle Rebillon; Catherine Winter
- Starring: Jean Carmet; Jean Bouise; Jean-Pierre Marielle
- Cinematography: Jacques Loiseleux
- Edited by: Albert Jurgenson
- Music by: Vladimir Cosma
- Distributed by: NPF Planfilm
- Release dates: 26 February 1975 (France); 28 June 1976 (United States)
- Running time: 100 minutes
- Country: France
- Language: French
- Box office: $10.9 million

The Common Man (French: Dupont Lajoie) is a 1975 French drama film directed by Yves Boisset and produced by Sofracima. It was entered into the 25th Berlin International Film Festival, where it won the Silver Bear - Special Jury Prize. In the United States, the film was released under the title Rape of Innocence.

== Plot ==
Georges Lajoie is a cafe owner in Paris, on Place d'Aligre. The Lajoies and their son Léon, a high school graduate, are leaving with their new caravan to spend their summer vacation, as they do every year, on the Provençal coast, at the "Camping-Caravaning Beau-soleil" run by Loulou, a Pied-Noir.

There, the Lajoies meet the Schumachers, bailiffs in Strasbourg, and the Colins, underwear sellers at the markets. These good Frenchmen from the North spout off platitudes, notably about the supposed laziness of "people from the South," but nevertheless want to make friends with the Vigorellis, Italians who are new to the campsite. Vigorelli is a construction site manager and considers the new buildings constructed by Loulou for vacationers, using the low-wage labor of Algerian workers housed in a shack, to be "crap." But Vigorelli and Loulou speak Arabic and respect the immigrant workers for their hard work.

On several occasions, it becomes clear that Georges Lajoie is strongly attracted to the beautiful Brigitte, the Colins' daughter. He even loses his composure, to the point that at the beach, Brigitte suggests he put on sunscreen, finding his face all red, while he was casting a lecherous glance at her.

Brigitte, however, seems destined for Léon, and their flirtation seems well underway.

At a dance, Lajoie violently attacks one of the Algerian workers, who has come to dance a little too close to Brigitte. The scuffle brings the police, who only arrest the Algerians.

The "Inter-camping" summer games, led by the bombastic Léo Tartaffione, attract the entire local population. Out for a walk, Lajoie encounters Brigitte, stark naked in the sun, in a quiet little corner. An awkward and vaguely sensual conversation ensues. When Brigitte puts on her pants, Lajoie becomes insistent, kissing the young girl despite her refusal. Lajoie sexually assaults Brigitte, who struggles. During the rape, Lajoie pushes her away with one hand under the chin, causing whiplash and the young girl's death. Lajoie continues to rape her for a moment before realizing he has just killed her. He decides to carry her to the Algerian workers' barracks, which is about a hundred meters away.

Chief Inspector Boulard conducts the investigation among the campers and at the site of the body's discovery. The medical examiner declares that the body has been transported. Boulard, with a worried expression, announces to the campers that interrogations will take place the next day. The inspector is unable to apprehend the two Algerians, previously expelled by the gendarmes, because Loulou tells him that she remembers seeing them watching a football match on television at the time of the rape.

Some campers are angry that the police aren't immediately arresting the "Bicots." A tough guy in a Bigeard cap is stirring things up. Colin, distraught, lets himself be led. A commando of campers forms, despite pleas for calm from Loulou, Vigorelli, and Lajoie's son, and bursts into the Algerians' barracks in the middle of the night. Lajoie, the rapist and murderer, is agitated among the vigilantes. An Algerian is attacked and seriously injured. His brother defends himself: he is massacred, while two other workers manage to escape.

Inspector Boulard is now investigating the beating and, at the hospital, takes a statement from the injured Algerian.

Summoned to the morgue before the remains of the murdered Algerian, local officials point out the risk of losing tourists, or even racist riots, and try to dissuade Boulard from going any further. But the latter retorts that he will conduct this investigation as he sees fit and to the end.

The two fugitive workers, taken to the campsite, identify the attackers. Boulard summons the suspected campers to the elementary school for the next day.

However, a senior civil servant, a caricatured ENA graduate, dispatched from Paris and eager to hush up the affair to prevent incidents from breaking out across France, informs Boulard that the investigation must conclude with a dismissal, which he tries to get him to sign. When Boulard refuses and returns the document, the senior civil servant suggests that the investigation could then be withdrawn and his promotion to commissioner would be jeopardized. Conversely, if he drops the case, his promotion will be accelerated.

Later, Boulard asks Vigorelli and Léon to testify, but they reluctantly refuse to resort to informing.

When the suspected campers are summoned to school, Boulard tells them that he knows they are guilty of the beating, and Colin denounces himself, despite the others' protests. But the murderous campers are exonerated, Boulard having changed his mind under pressure from the higher courts. Brigitte's murder is blamed on the dead Algerian, and his death on the other Algerians who, to save the honor of their village, would have allegedly executed him. Boulard nevertheless leaves the premises, expressing his disgust to the campers.

Some are proud of this sordid outcome, but others feel bad. Colin, overwhelmed, refuses to greet his old friends, who are leaving the campsite after only four days of vacation. In a fit of cynicism, Lajoie mentions "all that money wasted" (the campsite rent).

Léon is angry with his father and leaves his parents. Lajoie says goodbye to Loulou, but the latter asks him—and, contrary to his southern habits, in the formal "vous"—never to return to the campsite again.

Some time later, back in his brasserie, Lajoie tells his regulars, with many lies, how he and his friends punished the Algerians guilty of Brigitte's murder. But just then, the man whose brother was killed enters the bistro. He takes a sawed-off shotgun out of his raincoat and points it at Lajoie. Two shots ring out.

== Cast ==
- Jean Carmet as Georges Lajoie
- Pierre Tornade as Colin
- Jean Bouise as Detective Boulard
- Michel Peyrelon as Albert Schumacher
- Ginette Garcin as Ginette Lajoie
- Pascale Roberts as Madame Colin
- Jean-Pierre Marielle as Léo Tartaffione
- Robert Castel as Loulou
- Pino Caruso as Vigorelli
- Isabelle Huppert as Brigitte Colin
- Jacques Chailleux as Léon Lajoie
- Henri Garcin as the senior official
- Odile Poisson as Mme Schumacher
- Victor Lanoux as the Strong man
- Mohamed Zinet as Saïd's brother

== Critical response ==
Though the film was a commercial success in France, it received criticisms for "failing to fully explore the issues of French anti-Arab racism that lie at the heart of the narrative".
