= Soufflé (disambiguation) =

A soufflé is a light, fluffy, baked dish made with egg yolks. It may also refer to:

- Soufflé (cookware), a ramekin for soufflés
- Souffle (heart sound), medical term
- Soufflé (programming language), a logic programming language influenced by Datalog
- Souffles (magazine), Moroccan quarterly magazine of the 1960s
- Lemon Souffle, a racehorse
- Lofty's Roach Souffle, music album by Harry Connick, Jr.

== See also ==
- Le deuxième souffle (disambiguation)
