= Army of Shadows =

1969 film by Jean-Pierre Melville

- 2006 theatrical re-release poster
- Directed by: Jean-Pierre Melville
- Written by: Jean-Pierre Melville
- Based on: Army of Shadows by Joseph Kessel
- Produced by: Jacques Dorfmann
- Starring: Lino Ventura; Paul Meurisse; Jean-Pierre Cassel; Simone Signoret; Paul Crauchet; Claude Mann; Christian Barbier
- Cinematography: Pierre Lhomme
- Edited by: Françoise Bonnot
- Music by: Éric Demarsan
- Production companies: Les Films Corona; Fono Roma
- Distributed by: Valoria Films (France); Fida Cinematografica (Italy)
- Release dates: 12 September 1969 (France); 6 October 1970 (Italy)
- Running time: 145 minutes
- Countries: France; Italy
- Languages: French; German; English
- Box office: $928,632

Army of Shadows (French: L'Armée des ombres; Italian: L'armata degli eroi) is a 1969 Franco-Italian World War II suspense-drama film written and directed by Jean-Pierre Melville, and starring Lino Ventura, Paul Meurisse, Jean-Pierre Cassel, and Simone Signoret. It is an adaptation of Joseph Kessel's 1943 book of the same name, which mixes Kessel's experiences as a member of the French Resistance with fictional versions of other Resistance members.

The film follows a small group of Resistance fighters as they move between safe houses, work with the Allied militaries, kill informers, and attempt to evade the capture and execution that they know is their most likely fate. While portraying its characters as heroic, the film presents a bleak, unromantic view of the Resistance.

At the time of its initial release in France, Army of Shadows was not well-received, as, in the wake of the events of May 1968, French critics denounced it for its perceived glorification of Charles de Gaulle. American art-film programmers of the time took their cues from Cahiers du cinéma, which attacked the film on this basis, so it was not released in the United States until 2006, after a reappraisal of the film and Melville's oeuvre published in Cahiers du cinéma in the mid-1990s led to its restoration and re-release. The film was critically acclaimed in the U.S. and appeared on many critics' lists of the best films of 2006.

== Plot ==
Philippe Gerbier, the head of a French Resistance cell, is arrested by Vichy French police on suspicion of Resistance activity. Although he is acquitted due to a lack of evidence, he is still sent to an internment camp. He and a young Communist work on an escape plan, but before they can execute it, Gerbier is transported to Paris. While waiting to be questioned by the Gestapo, he manages to kill a guard and flee.

In Marseille, Gerbier, Félix Lepercq, Guillaume "Le Bison" Vermersch, and Claude "Le Masque" Ullmann trick Paul Dounat, the young agent who betrayed Gerbier, into meeting them. They take him to a house, but discover the neighboring house is newly occupied, so they cannot use their guns to kill Dounat. Lacking a decent knife, they strangle their former associate.

Félix meets his old friend Jean-François Jardie in a bar and recruits the risk-loving former pilot to join the Resistance. While on a mission to Paris, Jean-François visits his older brother Luc, a renowned philosopher who appears to live a detached, scholarly life. He then travels to the Mediterranean coast to help evacuate some Allied soldiers, along with Gerbier and the "Big Boss", to London via a submarine to Gibraltar. Jean-François does not recognize him in the dark, but the Big Boss turns out to be Luc, whose identity is a closely guarded secret.

In London, Gerbier tries to arrange additional support for the Resistance from the Free French leadership, and Luc is decorated by Charles de Gaulle. When Gerbier learns Félix has been arrested by the Gestapo, he cuts his trip short and parachutes into the French countryside.

After Félix's arrest, Mathilde, a Parisian housewife who is part of the Resistance, moves down to Lyon to run Gerbier's cell. Gerbier is impressed by her abilities, so he keeps her around. She devises a plan to rescue Félix, who is being tortured at the Gestapo headquarters. Jean-François, after hearing the details, writes Gerbier a letter of resignation and incriminates himself with an anonymous letter to the Gestapo so he will be jailed with Félix. Mathilde, Le Masque, and Le Bison try to rescue Félix disguised as Germans and with a forged order to transfer him to Paris, but their plan fails when the prison doctor pronounces him unfit for transport, as he is barely alive. When Jean-François, who has also been badly beaten, sees the rescue has failed, he gives Félix his only cyanide pill.

Having seen Gerbier's picture on a wanted poster during the rescue attempt, Mathilde urges him to lie low, but he says there is no one who can take his place at the moment. He is swept up in a raid by Vichy police and handed over to the Germans. Taken to be executed, Gerbier and his cellmates are told that, if they can reach the far wall of a room before they are killed by machine gunners, they will be allowed to live a little longer. Once the shooting starts Gerbier runs to the wall, when suddenly Mathilde and Le Bison appear by a window and throw smoke bombs to block the Germans' view and a rope to help Gerbier. He climbs it and escapes with the group.

Gerbier goes to hide out for a month in an abandoned farmhouse. One day, Luc arrives to discuss what to do about Mathilde, who has been arrested. He worries she will inform on her confederates, as her teenage daughter has been threatened. Luc hides when Le Masque and Le Bison arrive with the news that Mathilde is free and two members of the Resistance have been captured. Gerbier orders Mathilde's immediate execution, but Le Bison refuses to do so and swears to prevent Gerbier from killing her, so Luc emerges and convinces Le Bison that Mathilde would want them to kill her before she is forced to identify anyone else.

Luc accompanies Gerbier, Le Bison, and Le Masque to Paris. They locate Mathilde on the street, and Le Bison shoots her twice before they drive away. Closing text reveals that all four men were captured and died within less than a year, either through suicide or at the hands of the Nazis. Gerbier's precise fate is succinctly described as "on 13 February 1944, he decided not to run this time".

== Cast ==
- Lino Ventura as Philippe Gerbier, a civil engineer who leads a French Resistance cell based in Lyon
- Paul Meurisse as "Saint" Luc Jardie, who, unknown to his brother Jean-François, is a senior member of the Resistance. This character is partly based on the philosopher and Resistance leader Jean Cavaillès.
- Jean-Pierre Cassel as Jean-François Jardie, Luc's younger brother, who joins Gerbier's Resistance cell through his friendship with Félix
- Simone Signoret as Mathilde, who becomes Gerbier's assistant
- Claude Mann as Claude "Le Masque" Ullmann, the youngest member of Gerbier's Resistance cell
- Paul Crauchet as Félix Lepercq, a member of Gerbier's Resistance cell
- Christian Barbier as Guillaume "Le Bison" Vermersch, a member of Gerbier's Resistance cell
- Serge Reggiani as the barber who gives Gerbier a shave and a jacket
- André "Colonel Passy" Dewavrin as himself, an official of the Free France intelligence services based in London
- Alain Dekok as Legrain, the young Communist who works at the power plant of the internment camp to which Gerbier is sent
- Alain Mottet as the commander of the internment camp to which Gerbier is sent
- Alain Libolt as Paul Dounat, the young member of Gerbier's Resistance cell who is killed for informing on his associates
- Jean-Marie Robain as Baron de Ferté-Talloire, who lets Gerbier use his estate for Resistance activities
- Albert Michel as the gendarme who escorts Gerbier to the internment camp
- Denis Sadier as the doctor at the Gestapo headquarters in Lyon
- Georges Sellier as Colonel Jarret du Plessis, who is held in the same building as Gerbier at the internment camp
- Marco Perrin as Octave Bonnafous, a traveling salesman who is held in the same building as Gerbier at the internment camp
- Hubert de Lapparent as Aubert, a pharmacist who is held in the same building as Gerbier at the internment camp
- Colin Mann as the RAF soldier who rides in the plane with Gerbier
- Anthony Stuart as the RAF Major who teaches Gerbier about his parachuting equipment
- Michel Fretault as the "anonymous patriot" who escapes with Gerbier in Paris
- Michel Dacquin as one of Gerbier's cellmates after he is apprehended in the restaurant
- Jeanne Pérez as Marie, Luc's maid
- Pierre Vaudier as the man at the antique shop
- Jacques Marbeuf as the German officer and lead interrogator at the Gestapo headquarters in Lyon.
- Marcel Bernier as the customs agent who comes across Jean-François on the beach at night (uncredited)

Nathalie Delon, who had made her big-screen debut in Melville's previous film, Le Samouraï (1967), has a cameo appearance in Army of Shadows as the woman with Jean-François at the bar in Marseille. The film's editor, Françoise Bonnot, plays the secretary at the talent agency in Lyon.

== Critical reception ==
When it was originally released in France in 1969, the film had a poor critical reception due to the political context of the time, as the events of May 68 had hurt de Gaulle's reputation, and the glorification of the Resistance had become taboo during the Algerian War. As a result of the poor reviews, it was not initially distributed widely outside of France, but it was very well-received when it was finally released in the U.K. in the late 1970s. American audiences were unable to discover the film until 2006, when a restoration was released, and the film then appeared on many critics' top ten lists of the best films of 2006.

- 1st – David Ansen, Newsweek
- 1st – Ella Taylor, LA Weekly
- 1st – Glenn Kenny, Premiere
- 1st – Manohla Dargis, The New York Times
- 1st – Scott Foundas, LA Weekly
- 1st – Stephanie Zacharek, Salon
- 2nd – Jonathan Rosenbaum, Chicago Reader (tied with Statues Also Die)
- 2nd – Michael Sragow, The Baltimore Sun
- 2nd – Nathan Lee, The Village Voice
- 2nd – Wesley Morris, The Boston Globe
- 3rd – Stephen Hunter, The Washington Post
- 4th – Shawn Levy, The Oregonian
- 4th – Sheri Linden, The Hollywood Reporter
- 5th – Marjorie Baumgarten, The Austin Chronicle
- 7th – Richard James Havis, The Hollywood Reporter
- 7th – Richard Schickel, Time magazine
- 8th – Michael Wilmington, Chicago Tribune

Unranked top ten

- Steven Rea, The Philadelphia Inquirer
- V.A. Musetto, New York Post

On review aggregator website Rotten Tomatoes, the film has a 97% approval rating based on 79 reviews, with an average score of 9.1 out of 10; the site's "critics consensus" reads: "Originally made in 1969, this recently reissued classic is a masterful examination of the inner workings of the World War II resistance efforts." On Metacritic, the film has a weighted average score of 99 out of 100 based on 24 reviews, indicating "universal acclaim".

Upon its 2006 release, Roger Ebert added Army of Shadows to his "Great Movies" list, writing: "This restored 35mm print, now in art theaters around the country, may be 37 years old, but it is the best foreign film of the year."

Cinematographer Roger Deakins has added Army of Shadows in his favorite films list, describing it as a movie with "sense of mood and the sense of place" and "uncluttered", as has director Lawrence Kasdan.

== Home media ==
In Europe, the British Film Institute released the film on Region 2 DVD in November 2006. It was released on Blu-ray as part of the StudioCanal Collection in 2013, with a bonus documentary and a booklet as special features.

In the United States, the film was released by the Criterion Collection on both Region 1 DVD and Blu-ray in May 2007. This release was out of print by 2010 and re-issued in April 2020.

== Television series ==
In August 2025, it was announced that Ronan Bennett would write the six-part series, loosely based on the book and the movie for Channel 4 and Canal+, shifting the story from the French resistance in World War II to a near-future authoritarian Britain. In July 2026, it was announced that Paddy Considine, America Ferrera, Alex Hassell, and Kit Harington would lead the series, with Lisa Gunning directing all episodes.
