= Christine Fabréga =

French actress and television personality

- Fabréga in Le deuxième souffle (1966)
- Born: 8 April 1931; Paris, France
- Died: 11 June 1988 (aged 57); Paris, France
- Occupations: Actor; TV personality
- Years active: 1966–1985

Christine Fabréga (8 April 1931 in Paris – 11 June 1988) was a French actress and television personality.

== Filmography ==
- 1953: Le gang des pianos à bretelles - un mannequin
- 1966: Le deuxième souffle (directed by Jean-Pierre Melville, starring Lino Ventura) - Simone - dite 'Manouche'
- 1967: Les risques du métier (directed by André Cayatte, starring Jacques Brel) - Madame Roussel
- 1970: La peau de Torpédo (directed by Jean Delannoy, starring Michel Constantin) - Sylvianne Collet
- 1972: Nous ne vieillirons pas ensemble (directed by Maurice Pialat, starring Jean Yanne) - mère de Catherine
- 1973: Deux hommes dans la ville (directed by José Giovanni, starring Jean Gabin) - Geneviève Cazeneuve
- 1974: Les murs ont des oreilles (directed by Jean Girault, starring Louis Velle) - Gilda, la cuisinière
- 1974: There's Nothing Wrong with Being Good to Yourself (C'est jeune et ça sait tout) (directed by Claude Mulot)
- 1975: Tamara ou Comment j'ai enterré ma vie de jeune fille (directed by Michel Berkowitch)
- 1976: Pourquoi? (directed by Anouk Bernard, starring Gérard Barray) - la psychologue
- 1978: L'Exercice du pouvoir (directed by Philippe Galland, starring Michel Aumont)
