= Run, Run, Joe! =

- Directed by: Giuseppe Colizzi
- Produced by: Carlo Ponti
- Starring: Keith Carradine; Tom Skerritt
- Cinematography: Marcello Masciocchi
- Edited by: Antonio Siciliano
- Music by: Guido & Maurizio De Angelis
- Release date: September 1974
- Country: Italy
- Language: English

Run, Run, Joe! (Italian: Arrivano Joe e Margherito, also known as Joe and Margherito) is an Italian comedy movie directed in 1974 by Giuseppe Colizzi. It is the penultimate movie of Colizzi, before the posthumously released Switch. The movie reprises the style of the movies of the popular duo Bud Spencer-Terence Hill, that the same Colizzi had launched in 1967 in God Forgives... I Don't!. It was co-produced with West Germany (where it is known as J & M - Dynamit in der Schnauze and Dufte Typen räumen auf), Spain (where it was released as Joe y Margherito) and France.

== Plot ==
Joe is assigned to protect Don Salvatore who is about to leave Italy for the United States. Don Salvatore has a number of enemies but Joe is supported by a new friend, the courageous mariner Margherito. But even the efforts of both of them are eventually not sufficient to keep Don Salvatore alive. Since the mafia considers Joe accountable, the new friends have to seek cover. They start to pretend they were English.

== Cast ==
- Keith Carradine as Joe
- Tom Skerritt as Margherito
- Cyril Cusack as Parkintosh
- Sybil Danning as Betty Parkintosh
- José Calvo as Don Salvatore
- Raymond Bussières as Don Sulpicone
- Marcello Mandò as Sapicone

== See also ==
- List of Italian films of 1974
