= Bettiol =

Bettiol is a surname of Italian origin. Notable people with the surname include:

- Alberto Bettiol (born 1993), Italian road racing cyclist
- Grégory Bettiol (born 1986), French footballer
- Italo Bettiol (1926–2022), Italian-French film director
- Salvatore Bettiol (born 1961), Italian long-distance runner
