= Popsy Pop =

1971 film

- Directed by: Jean Herman
- Screenplay by: Henri Charrière; Jean Herman; Jean-Baptiste Bellsolell
- Story by: Henri Charrière
- Starring: Claudia Cardinale; Stanley Baker; Henri Charrière
- Cinematography: Jean-Jacques Tarbès
- Edited by: Hélène Plemiannikov
- Music by: Frédéric Botton
- Production companies: Sofracima; Audifilm; Fida Cinematografica
- Release dates: March 10, 1971 (France); March 26, 1971 (Italy)
- Running time: 100 minutes
- Countries: France; Italy
- Budget: $2 million

Popsy Pop is a 1971 crime film. It was a French and Italian co-production between the Paris-based Sofracima and Audifilm and the Rome-based Fida Cinematografica.

It stars Claudia Cardinale, Stanley Baker and Henri Charrière, the real-life Papillon.

== Plot ==
The Venezuelan hamlet Vista Alegra lives from recuperating diamonds from the muddy soil. Inspector Silva, a former private eye, has been put there as surveyor by the international diamond company to whom the locals sell their finds. One day, French singer Popsy Pop travelling with a giant edition of Alice in Wonderland and a doll called "Alice", arrives on the monthly boat accompanied by a small group of gangsters led by the elderly Marcou, who, with Popsy's aid, plan to steal the diamonds worth 2 million dollars, using the celebrations on the Venezuelan Independence day as cover.

As planned, Silva starts courting and falling for Popsy - she calls him her King of Hearts - and at her request gives up guarding the diamonds that evening to listen to her performing the song Popsy Pop on the local stage. When the theft down goes as planned, Popsy alone escapes with the diamond by helicopter to Caracas, leaving her three accomplices behind, who are caught and prepared to be lynched by the angried local mob. After watching the mob leader kill Marcou's two accomplices, Silva convinces him to spare Marcou himself so he can help him in his search for Popsy and the diamonds. Silva and Marcou strike a deal: Marcou is to get Popsy, whom he loves, and 15 percent of the loot.

Popsy and her friend Freddy use false passports to board a flight to Santo Domingo where they are followed by Silva and Marcou. Popsy at first puts the diamonds in a safe deposit box and then meets Father Legba in Haiti, who runs a commercial operation with a big group of religious followers. In the meantime, Silva and Marcou locate Freddy and through him find out about Popsy's whereabouts, following her to Haiti. When Popsy tells Legba that she has the diamonds, he does not believe her at first and whips her until she submits to him, promising to give them to him if he keeps her safe from Marcou. During a local rite including the beheading of a lamb and ecstatic drum music, Popsy, involved against her will, is dangerously caught up in wild harassing dancing and saved by Silva. Marcou has Legba at gunpoint, and when Legba tells him that it was Popsy, not him, who tried to screw him over and that she was only a whore, Marcou shoots him, telling him he should not have said that. Popsy at first does not want to tell Silva where the diamonds are, but after he puts her through a forced barefoot walk towards the escape boat, she tells him about the safe storage in a Santo Domingo bank.

She also tells Silva that she loves him, kissing him. Marcou comes, sees the kiss, and starts a fight with Silva. In the end, Silva offers her to him but Popsy says she hates him and that he is too old. Silva says Marcou to go ahead and strangle Popsy with his bare hands if he can (a thing they talked about earlier at a bar), but warns him that he will not find it easy, then walks away. Marcou indeed puts his hands around Popsy's throat but cannot bring himself to squeeze. He gently strokes her hair instead. Popsy looks at him with wide eyes of recognition and wonderment.

== Cast ==
- Claudia Cardinale as Popsy Pop
- Stanley Baker as Silva
- Henri Charrière as Marcou
- Marc Mazza as Tormenta
- Georges Aminel as Father Legba
- Ginette Leclerc as Mrs. Irma
- Joachim Hansen as Freddy
- Leroy Haynesas Blanchette
- Moune de Rivel (fr) as Sister Marie-Galante

== Production ==
The film was the idea of Henri Charrière, author of Papillon, who wrote the script in eight days. He sold it to producer Catherine Winter. The film was shot in jungle 120 miles from Caracas, but something was filmed in the Venezuela's capital. There were French and English versions filmed simultaneously. Charriere plays a support role.

== Release ==
Popsy Pop was released in France on March 10, 1971. The film was quick re-released under the title La Belle Garce et le Truand (lit. 'The Beautiful Bitch and the Crook'). In France, it had 337,700 spectators in France.

It was released in Italy as Fuori il malloppo (Popsy Pop) on March 26, 1971. It grossed approximately 336,795,000 Italian lire.

It was later distributed by the The Cannon Group on September 23, 1973 in the United States as The Butterfly Affair. This version was cut to 75 minutes. In the United Kingdom, it was distributed by New Realm Entertainments on November 17, 1974 in the United Kingdom as The 21 Carat Snatch. This version was cut to 87 minutes.
