= Leroy Haynes =

American actor and restaurateur (1914–1986)

- Born: Leroy Howard Milton Haynes; January 7, 1914; Clinton, Kentucky, United States
- Died: 1986 (aged 71–72)
- Occupations: Restaurateur and actor
- Known for: Chez Haynes restaurant in Paris, France
- Spouses: Gabrielle Lecarbonnier (m. 1949; div.); Maria dos Santos

Leroy Haynes (7 January 1914 – 1986) was an American restaurateur and actor. As an actor, he appeared in The Butterfly Affair, Bons Baisers de Hong Kong, and Ace High. His restaurant Chez Haynes in Paris, France, became an iconic restaurant that was visited by well known actors and entertainers.

== Biography ==
Leroy "Roughouse" Haynes was born Leroy Howard Milton Haynes in Clinton, Kentucky, United States, on January 7, 1914, to parents Robert Haynes and M. C. Curine Lena. A student of the arts, he was a Morehouse graduate who earned the nickname "Roughouse" from his football playing days. He enlisted in the U.S. army, serving from 1946 to 1949, during which time he went to Europe. While stationed in Germany, he would go to Paris, where he chose to remain after completing his service, leaving with the rank of a chief warrant officer in Europe. In 1949, he married Gabrielle Lecarbonnier, a young French woman. Together they opened "Gabby and Haynes", and later Chez Haynes. Culinary historian Adrian Miller in his book Soul Food: The Surprising Story of an American Cuisine, One Plate at a Time (2013) quoted a newspaper saying in 1966 that the restaurant restaurant "would make Haynes America's unofficial ambassador to France for down home cooking and, later, for soul food." As part of Parisian African-American culinary history, he has been honored by Electra Weston in her performances. From the 1960s, he acted in movies of the gangster genre. He was also the president of the American Fellowship for a period of time.

Haynes died in 1986. His widow Maria dos Santos continued running the restaurant for 23 years after his death, until it closed in 2009.

== Professional baseball ==
Leroy appeared briefly in the Negro Leagues for the Atlanta Black Crackers, playing in left field and going 3-for-6 in two documented games in 1939.

== Restaurant ==
His soul food restaurant was opened in 1949. They would serve fried chicken and chitlins, beans and rice, mashed potatoes, and corn bread. The clientele included African Americans living in Paris, as well as others visiting, also white Europeans wanting to try the food. Haynes and his restaurant feature in the French film La Bonzesse (1974), directed by François Jouffa.

== Actor ==
In 1961, Haynes had an early film role was in Un nommé La Rocca, directed by Jean Becker. He then appeared in Le gorille a mordu l'archevêque in 1962. His last film roles included being in the 1975 Yvan Chiffre-directed Bons Baisers de Hong Kong (From Hong Kong with Love).

=== Filmography ===
Film
Title	Year	Role	Director	Notes #
Un nommé La Rocca	1961	Racketteur	Jean Becker	Uncredited
Le gorille a mordu l'archevêque	1962		Maurice Labro	
Gendarme in New York	1965	Le chauffeur de taxi	Jean Girault	
Trois chambres à Manhattan	1965		Marcel Carné	
Tendre voyou	1966	Le cuisinier du yacht	Jean Becker	
Die Schatzinsel	1966 / 1967	Abraham Gray	Wolfgang Liebeneiner	groundbreaking German TV miniseries
I quattro dell'Ave Maria	1968	Prize boxer	Giuseppe Colizzi	Uncredited
Le Cri du cormoran, le soir au-dessus des jonques	1971	Boubou	Michel Audiard	Uncredited
Popsy Pop	1971	Ponchette	Jean Herman	
Petroleum Girls	1971	Marquis	Christian-Jaque, Guy Casaril	
L'Atlantide	1972	Bamako	Jean Kerchbron	TV movie
L'ange de la rivière morte	1974	Big Joe	Edouard Logereau	TV movie
Bons Baisers de Hong Kong	1975	Le gros noir	Yvan Chiffre	
Le faucon	1983	Entraîneur boxe	Paul Boujenah	
