= Two Men in Town (1973 film) =

1973 Franco-Italian film directed by José Giovanni

- Directed by: José Giovanni
- Written by: José Giovanni
- Produced by: Alain Delon
- Starring: Jean Gabin; Alain Delon
- Cinematography: Jean-Jacques Tarbes
- Edited by: Francoise Javet
- Music by: Philippe Sarde
- Distributed by: Valoria Films
- Release date: 25 October 1973 (France)
- Running time: 100 minutes
- Countries: France; Italy
- Box office: $18.4 million

Two Men in Town (French: Deux hommes dans la ville a.k.a. Two Against the Law) is a 1973 Franco-Italian film directed by José Giovanni.

The film was remade in 2014.

== Plot ==
Germain Cazeneuve left the police to work as a prison trainer, teaching inmates how to live once out of jail and how to stay out. He stands guarantor when Gino Strabliggi, a printer by trade, is paroled two years before his twelve-year sentence for bank robbery expires. Strabliggi has decided to go straight.

Cazeneuve and his family offer friendship to Strabliggi and his wife Sophie, who has waited faithfully for ten years, until two drivers racing along a country road kill Sophie by accident.

Strabliggi gets a steady job as a printer and meets Lucy, a bank employee, who moves into his flat.

On a regular visit to the police station to renew his parole, he is seen by Inspector Goitreau who originally arrested him and immediately follows him. As he stops for petrol, some old criminal associates spot him and give him the address of their hideout. Goitreau, suspecting Strabliggi is part of their plans, arrests him and gets the address, but Cazeneuve gets him freed.

Thwarted, Goitreau starts harassing Strabliggi, questioning his boss at the printers and his girlfriend at the bank.

When the gang pull off a raid, Goitreau knows where they will meet up and arrests them all. He is confident Strabliggi was also part of the operation and breaks into his flat, where he finds Lucy and starts pushing her about. Strabliggi comes in behind him and, angered by his girl being assaulted, strangles Goitreau.

Strabliggi is tried and condemned to death. His lawyer and Cazeneuve attend the execution by guillotine.

== Cast ==
- Jean Gabin as Germain Cazeneuve
- Alain Delon as Gino Strabliggi
- Mimsy Farmer as Lucie
- Victor Lanoux as Marcel
- Cécile Vassort as Évelyne Cazeneuve
- Ilaria Occhini as Sophie Strabliggi
- Guido Alberti as the owner of the printing shop
- Malka Ribowska as the lawyer
- Christine Fabréga as Geneviève Cazeneuve
- Gérard Depardieu as the young gangster
- Robert Castel as André Vaultier
- Bernard Giraudeau as Frédéric Cazeneuve
- Michel Bouquet as Inspector Goitreau
