= Girl Slaves of Morgana Le Fay =

- Directed by: Bruno Gantillon
- Written by: Bruno Gantillon; Jacques Chaumelle
- Produced by: Gisele Rébillon; Catherine Winter; Raymond Gautreau
- Starring: Dominique Delpierre; Mireille Saunin; Michèle Perello; Alfred Baillou
- Cinematography: Jean Monsigny
- Edited by: Michel Patient
- Music by: François de Roubaix (as Cisco El Rubio)
- Production companies: Sofracima; Oceanic Films; CFDC
- Release date: 17 February 1971 (France)
- Running time: 86 minutes
- Country: France

Girl Slaves of Morgana Le Fay (French: Morgane et ses nymphes) is a 1971 French film by Bruno Gantillon, an erotic horror tale involving Morgan le Fay and a castle full of women in the French countryside. Morgan rules the island Avalon as if it were Lesbos in a lesbian exploitative film praised by critics for its setup and characters, and named a "neglected Eurotrash classic".

== Plot ==
Two young women, Anna and Françoise, travel by car through the Auvergne. Having run out of gas near an odd village, they spend the night in a barn where they have sex. The next morning, Anna is gone and a dwarf in medieval garb guides Françoise through a forest (later identified as Brocéliande) to a lake, where a magic canoe carries her to an island, and then to a castle where scantily clad women frolic and kiss, overseen by the dwarf Gurth. Françoise is interviewed by Morgan le Fay and bathed by some of her women. Gurth reveals in a monologue that he procures the women for Morgan and has aspirations to take over.

During dinner, Morgan and Françoise discuss love and beauty, and Morgan reveals that time is at her command. Afterward, she proceeds to caress and kiss Françoise, while her women wonder if they have been forgotten. Morgan offers immortality and beauty; if the offer is not accepted, a life of abjection among a group of older women is the victim's lot. Anna, tied up in the basement, accepts the offer, but Françoise escapes to look for the boat. She manages to swim across, only to find Morgan waiting for her on the other side, wherever she turns; she takes her back to her castle and promises to teach her magic.

Françoise, however, schemes with Gurth to escape, and a feast the next day appears to be a good occasion to get a magic necklace and other items together. Dances are performed and groups of women engage in various kinds of sex; Françoise has sex with the woman who has the magic tunic, and runs off with it. The necklace has also been stolen. Françoise, now in the tunic which renders her invisible and wearing the necklace (which controls the boat), needs only Morgan's topaz globe, without which she cannot leave the forest. Gurth is accused, and sentenced to blindness, muteness, and leglessness. He gives Françoise his "ring of life" so he will die and she will be able to escape; he dies instantly and Françoise escapes from the castle and boards the boat. Gurth's horse appears and Françoise rides off, ending up in the village, just in time for a funeral procession. However, she calls out for Morgan, who is there immediately. Morgan takes her back to the barn, where Anna is sleeping still with Françoise, being watched now by Françoise.

== Cast ==
- Dominique Delpierre: Morgan le Fay
- Alfred Baillou: Gurth
- Mireille Saunin: Françoise
- Régine Motte: Yael
- Ursule Pauly: Sylviane
- Michèle Perello: Anna
- Nathalie Chaine: Sarah
- Velly Beguard: herself

== Production ==
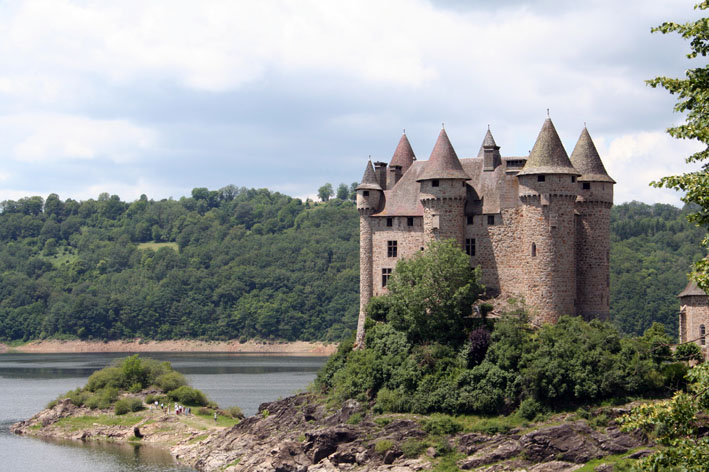
The Château de Val in 2007

The film was shot in 1970 on location in Bort-les-Orgues and in the castle Château de Val, which at the time had fallen into disrepair and was available cheaply. The cellar scenes (for Morgan's party) were filmed later, in Paris. During that party, a poem by Louise Labé is recited. The film was released in 1971 to an audience of around 25,000 viewers in its first week.

== Release ==
Girls Slaves of Morgana Le Fay was released in France on 17 February 1971.
