= Ace High (1968 film) =

1968 film by Giuseppe Colizzi

Ace High (I quattro dell'Ave Maria)
- U.S. theatrical release poster
- Directed by: Giuseppe Colizzi
- Screenplay by: Giuseppe Colizzi
- Produced by: Bino Cicogna; Giuseppe Colizzi
- Starring: Eli Wallach; Terence Hill; Brock Peters; Kevin McCarthy; Bud Spencer; Livio Lorenzon; Stephen Zacharias
- Cinematography: Marcello Masciocchi
- Edited by: Marcello Malvestito
- Music by: Carlo Rustichelli
- Production companies: Crono Cinematografica; San Marco
- Distributed by: Euro International Films (Italy); Paramount Pictures (U.S.)
- Release dates: 31 October 1968 (Italy); 3 September 1969 (USA)
- Running time: 126 minutes
- Country: Italy

Ace High (Italian: I quattro dell'Ave Maria, literally translated as "The Four of the Hail Mary", released in the UK as Revenge in El Paso) is a 1968 Italian Spaghetti Western film directed and written by Giuseppe Colizzi and starring Terence Hill, Bud Spencer and Eli Wallach. The film is the second in a trilogy that started with God Forgives... I Don't! and ended with Boot Hill.

== Plot ==
The first film in the trilogy, God Forgives . . . I Don't, ended with Cat and Hutch driving away in a wagon in which they possessed the gold from a train robbery by Bill San Antonio, who had apparently died in a dynamite blast. Ace High begins with Cat and Hutch arriving in El Paso, where they unsuccessfully try to claim the bounty for Bill from his last earthly remains – Bill's boots and hat - even though they have no body or body parts. Failing that, they go to bank manager Harold – whom Bill in the first film disclosed as his partner in setting up the robberies – and announce themselves as Bill. After using physical force they are received and "convince" him (using force) to issue them a cashier's check to be paid out in gold.

The banker visits condemned man Cacopoulos, who is to be hanged the next day, and offers to help him escape if he restores the money. That night, the deputy is knifed by two men, who let Cacopoulos out. He takes the dead man's gun and shoots the two, then pours himself a footbath and tests the dead men's boots to find a pair that fit. He then pays a visit to the bank manager and reminds him that he and two others put him in jail for 15 years, and on his release framed him for murder with a stolen knife - the same one that was used to kill the deputy. Consequently, he wants guarantees that he will not be tricked again. Harold throws the knife, but Cacopoulos swings the chair so it strikes the back, then swings back around and shoots the manager, adding that it is guarantee enough.

Dressed as a peon on a donkey, Cacopoulos meets Cat and Hutch and robs them. They follow his trail south to Mexico and encounter people to whom he has given money – and a high wire performer Thomas and his assistant that he offered money to. They catch up with him in a village during a fiesta (that he has paid for). While Cat is lured away looking for him elsewhere, Caco, playing a joke on Hutch, appears before him and, in a quieter place, tells him about Harold and the other two "friends" who shot his horse so he got caught after a bank robbery, and then framed him for murder. He says that he will give back their money, including what he has spent, if Hutch helps him collect his debts with the remaining two.

The first one is Paco who is a "revolutionary" shown presiding over a kangaroo court condemning men to death for "not fighting for country and freedom". His men capture Cacopoulos and Hutch, but Cat enlists help from another "revolutionary", Canganceiro, by telling him about Cacopoulos´ "treasure". Together they defeat Paco's men and Paco is killed by Cacopoulos, who in his wrath forgets to make him give back any money. After some pillaging by his men, Canganceiro starts another kangaroo court that executes people for "fighting for country and freedom", and Cacopoulous is jailed until he tells where his treasure is. Caco attempts to escape by lulling the guards to sleep by telling the story of his heritage: his grandfather was a Greek who married a young Cherokee woman, and his father was one of their children, how his father raised his family in a small mining town until he was mysteriously murdered, and how his grandfather, carrying little Caco, had to take his own son's body back to his own tribe. Hutch and Cat then help Cacopoulos escape, but he shoots off their saddles, quoting his grandfather that one partner is too little, and two are too many. They ambush the last two men of the pursuing Canganceiro bunch and take their horses.

They now follow Cacopoulos in the opposite direction, encountering dead Canganceiro men along the way, the last ones with their leader just outside Memphis. In Memphis, they find Caco washing dishes in a saloon, together with the acrobat and assistant – because in this town people are only interested in gambling, substantiated by the fact that Cacopoulos has lost all his money while he was looking for Drake, the third "partner".

Cat and Hutch visit Drake's casino. Hutch loses all his money, while Cat spots the croupier looking at a hole in the ceiling. They put up Hutch to win money in a prizefight, buy weapons and give the rest to Cacopoulos with instructions for him to show up with them in the casino tomorrow.

That night, with some acrobatic prowess, Thomas and Cat gain entrance to a room in the attic of the casino where there is a peek-hole down to the roulette table and a voice tube down to a basement room where a magnet can guide the roulette ball. Cat, Thomas and Hutch take positions in the two rooms. Cacopoulos, however, seeks the company of a saloon girl and wakes up in the morning robbed of his cash. He hastily replenishes it by forcibly inviting a bill collector to a card game that Cacopoulos "wins". He finally enters the casino, where he repeatedly puts the money on 13 until he breaks the bank with a $360,000 win. Drake and his men arrive and confront Cacopoulos, leading to a showdown. The opposing parties wait for the roulette ball to stop, while the customers lie down on the floor and a Viennese Waltz (suggested by Cacopoulos) is played. Drake's men are shot and he is wounded and taken by the vengeful customers, who realize they have been swindled. Cacopoulos faints from the shoot-out, but only his arm was wounded, and he leaves together with Cat and Hutch.

== Cast ==
- Eli Wallach as Cacopoulos
- Terence Hill as Cat Stevens
- Bud Spencer as Hutch Bessy
- Brock Peters as Thomas
- Kevin McCarthy as Drake
- Livio Lorenzon as Paco Rosa
- Steffen Zacharias as Mr. Harold
- Tiffany Hoyveld as Thomas' Wife
- Armando Bandini as Bank Cashier
- Remo Capitani as Cangaceiro
- Rick Boyd as Foster
- Bruno Corazzari as "Deputy" Charlie
- Franco Gula as Al
- Enzo Santaniello as Irish Farm Boy
- Simonetta Santaniello as Irish Farm Girl
- Frank Braña as Harold Henchman
- Antonio Molino Rojo as Harold Henchman
- Gildo Di Marco as Harold Henchman
- Riccardo Pizzuti as Harold Henchman
- Dante Cleri as Banker
- Aldo Sala as Casino Employee
- Luciano Telli as Casino Cashier
- Giuseppe Terranova as Casino Cashier
- Giancarlo Badessi as Boxing Promoter
- Roger Beaumont as Croupier
- Edoardo Torricella as Roulette Player
- Vicente Roca as Don Pedro Ramirez
- Leroy Haynes as Boxer
- Isa Foster
- Antoinetta Fiorito
- Corrado Olmi
- Paolo Magalotti
- Elio Angelucci

== Reception ==
In his investigation of narrative structures in Spaghetti Western films, Fridlund writes that all the Colizzi westerns present clever variations on several different kinds of partnerships encountered in other films inspired by For a Few Dollars More. Also, the pervading protagonists Cat and Hutch are differentiated by a set of physical and personal characteristics that reappear in the even more commercially successful They Call Me Trinity and Trinity Is Still My Name.
