= Raymond Meunier =

French actor

- Born: January 15, 1920
- Died: June 17, 2010 (aged 90)

Raymond Meunier (15 January 1920 – 17 June 2010) was a French actor. He appeared in more than thirty films from 1947 to 2005.

== Selected filmography ==
Film
Year	Title	Role	Notes
1947	Miroir	Minor rôle	Uncredited
1948	La Figure de proue		Uncredited
1949	Marlène		
1949	Ronde de nuit		
1952	Love Is Not a Sin		Uncredited
1953	La môme vert-de-gris	Hotel receptionist	Uncredited
1960	The Hole	Vossellin / Monseigneur	
1960	The Truth	The owner of 'Spoutnik'	
1961	Le Monocle noir	Raymond, Marquis' 1st henchman	
1962	Operation Gold Ingot		
1962	The Seventh Juror	M. Souchon	
1962	Carillons sans joie	Legionnaire	
1962	L'Œil du Monocle	Bob Dugoinneau	
1964	Salad by the Roots	Customs Officer	
1964	The Monocle Laughs	The Interviewer	Uncredited
1966	Tender Scoundrel	Taxi driver	
1966	Is Paris Burning?	Policeman	Uncredited
1967	La Grande Sauterelle		Uncredited
1968	L'Astragale		
1970	Last Known Address	Allister	
1971	To Die of Love	Danièle's lawyer	
1971	Le drapeau noir flotte sur la marmite	Tartinville	
1972	Fusil chargé		
1972	Trop jolies pour être honnêtes	Ship's captain	
1974	The Holes	Mathieu	
1976	La ville est à nous	Léonard Bertrand	
1983	One Deadly Summer	Brochard	
1985	The Satin Slipper	Minister	
1992	Loulou Graffiti	Saint Peter	
