= Les risques du métier =

- French DVD cover
- Directed by: André Cayatte
- Written by: André Cayatte; Armand Jammot
- Based on: Les risques du métier by Jean and Simone Cornec
- Produced by: Alain Poiré
- Starring: Jacques Brel; Emmanuelle Riva; René Dary
- Cinematography: Christian Matras
- Edited by: Hélène Plemiannikov
- Music by: Jacques Brel; François Rauber
- Production company: Gaumont International
- Distributed by: Gaumont Distribution
- Release date: 21 December 1967 (France)
- Running time: 105 minutes
- Country: France
- Language: French

Les risques du métier (Risky Business) is a 1967 French drama film directed by André Cayatte. This was Jacques Brel's first feature film and co-starred Emmanuelle Riva, Jacques Harden, and Nadine Alari. Brel also produced the soundtrack with François Rauber. The film was released on 21 December 1967. Film critics praised Brel's performance.

== Plot ==
A teenage girl accuses her primary schoolteacher, Jean Doucet, of trying to rape her. The police and the mayor investigate, but Doucet denies the charges. Two other students come forward to reveal more of Doucet's misconduct – one confessing to be his mistress. Doucet faces trial and hard labour if convicted.

== Cast ==
- Jacques Brel as Jean Doucet
- Emmanuelle Riva as Suzanne Doucet
- René Dary as Le maire / The Mayor
- Nadine Alari as Mme Arnaud
- Christine Fabréga as M. Roussel
- Jacques Harden as R. Arnaud
- Gabriel Gobin as Le juge d'instruction
- Muriel Baptiste as Martine
- Christine Simon as Brigitte
- Chantal Martin as Josette
- Nathalie Nell as Hélène
- Delphine Desyeux as Catherine
- Claudine Berg as Mme Cault
