= The Hole (1960 film) =

1960 French film by Jacques Becker

- Theatrical poster, Leroy (left) and Keraudy
- Directed by: Jacques Becker
- Screenplay by: Jacques Becker; José Giovanni; Jean Aurel
- Based on: The Break; 1957 book by José Giovanni
- Produced by: Serge Silberman
- Starring: Michel Constantin; Marc Michel; Jean Keraudy; Philippe Leroy; Raymond Meunier
- Cinematography: Ghislain Cloquet
- Edited by: Marguerite Renoir; Geneviève Vaury
- Music by: Philippe Arthuys
- Distributed by: Cinédis
- Release date: 18 March 1960
- Running time: 132 minutes
- Country: France
- Language: French

The Hole (French: Le Trou) is a 1960 French crime film directed by Jacques Becker. It is an adaptation of José Giovanni's 1957 book The Break. It was called The Night Watch when first released in the United States, but is released under its French title today. The film is based on a true event concerning five prison inmates in La Santé Prison in France in 1947. Becker, who died just weeks after shooting had wrapped, cast mostly non-actors for the main roles, including one man (Jean Keraudy) who was actually involved in the 1947 escape attempt, and who introduces the film. It was entered into the 1960 Cannes Film Festival.

== Plot ==
Claude Gaspard, a very polite prisoner, is moved to a cell containing four inmates due to ongoing repairs in his block. His four new cellmates--Manu Boreli, Geo Cassine, Roland Darbant, and Vossellin--are extremely close to one another, each expecting prison sentences ranging from ten years to possible execution by guillotine. Gaspard himself is accused of the attempted murder of his wife, and faces a potential 20-year sentence.

Taking a risk, Gaspard's inmates entrust him enough to let him in on their secret: they plan on escaping. They explain how they plan to break a hole through the floor of their cell, directly into the underground passages. Once Gaspard agrees to assist them, they use the prison noise throughout the day to mask the sounds of them breaking through concrete. Using a metal file, Roland removes the wooden floorboards from the corner of their room. The five inmates take turns digging through the hole with removed metal bars of their bed frame, keeping lookout using a periscope that Roland fashioned out of a toothbrush.

After they break through the floor, Manu and Roland explore the underground passage at night, while the other three men use blanketed puppets in their stead to throw off any guards' suspicion. Manu and Roland manoeuvre their way through the prison's galleries, until eventually they find a sewer tunnel. Seeing as how the tunnel has been excessively walled off by solid concrete, the inmates then decide to dedicate the next few days to digging around the blockade to the other side. Using a half-hourglass made out of two bottles Vossellin stole from the prison doctor, they also keep track of time so they appear back in their cell for inspection, covering their exit hole with a stack of cardboard sheets.

While this is happening, Geo privately informs Roland that he will not be escaping with the rest of them. It is revealed that when Geo was arrested, his mother almost died of shock after an encounter with the authorities. Fearing that the authorities may kill her if she is questioned about his escape, Geo decides that it's best for him to remain in prison. Gaspard is also visited by his wife's younger sister, who informs him that his charges could be dropped upon his request. Gaspard had been having an affair with her younger sister, and obviously wants to go free, which complicates his devotion to his cellmates.

Gaspard's possible dismissal weighs on his mind while digging through the tunnel with Manu at night. Manu manages to dig through to the other side of blockade, so the two explore the rest of the sewers on foot. After climbing up a manhole positioned outside of the prison walls, Gaspard and Manu marvel at the outside world finally at their grasp. Seeing a taxi drive past, Gaspard comments that the two could have taken it right then and there. Nevertheless, both prisoners return to their cell to inform the rest of their inmates. They decide to escape the following night.

Just as Geo reveals that he will not be going along with them, Gaspard gets called to a meeting with the warden. The warden tells Gaspard that his wife has withdrawn the charges accusing him of premeditated murder, and that he will be released soon. The warden also notices Gaspard's displeasure upon receiving this information, offering to help him if something is bothering him.

Two hours go by before Gaspard is returned to his cell. Almost immediately, the rest of the inmates are suspicious that Gaspard exposed their plans. Manu violently confronts him, accusing him of betrayal, to which Gaspard pleads that he did not turn them in. Manu apologizes, and the inmates prepare to leave that very same night.

Everyone except for Geo gets dressed to leave through the manhole, bidding their friend farewell. However, as they begin to remove floorboards to go down the hole, Geo looks through the periscope and sees a massive group of guards assembled next to their cell. Realizing that they've been caught, Manu lunges at Gaspard in a fit of rage, as Gaspard loudly protests. The guards quickly fill the room, struggling to prevent Manu from strangling Gaspard before eventually pulling him into the hall. Manu, Roland, Geo, and Vossellin are all stripped down to their underwear and lined up against the prison wall, as a guard uncovers the hole in the corner of the cell, through which another guard climbs up and reports that the underground passages were also being closely monitored.

Gaspard is led out of the cell still fully dressed, and told to move into a different cell. Before he leaves his fellow inmates behind, Roland utters "Poor Gaspard," before Gaspard is locked into a new cell all to himself, and the film ends. It is left ambiguous as to what deal Gaspard has made with the authorities or whether he will ultimately be freed.

== Cast ==
- Michel Constantin as Geo Cassine
- Marc Michel as Claude Gaspard
- Jean Keraudy as Roland Darbant
- Philippe Leroy as Manu Borelli
- Raymond Meunier as Vossellin / Monseigneur
- Jean-Paul Coquelin as Lieutenant Grinval
- André Bervil as the director
- Eddy Rasimi as Bouboule
- Gérard Hernandez as a prisoner
- Dominique Zardi as a prisoner
- Paul Préboist as a guard
- Catherine Spaak as Nicole (uncredited)

== Production ==
According to the 1964 press materials that are included in The Criterion Collection DVD, Jacques Becker first read of the 1947 La Santé Prison escape attempt in a newspaper. Years later, he found out that José Giovanni had fictionalized the same escape attempt in his 1957 novel The Break. Becker contacted Giovanni's publisher, Gallimard, and Becker and Giovanni collaborated on the screenplay of Le Trou.

During production, Becker hired three of the attempted escapees as technical consultants. One of the consultants, Roland Barbat (using the stage name Jean Keraudy), appears in the film as the character Roland Darbant, who plans the escape tunnel and improvises all the tools they use.

Barbat also appears at the beginning of the film as himself, working on a Citroën 2CV. (Barbat became a mechanic after prison.) He states directly to the camera that we are about to see his true story.

At the time, none of the actors who played the five core characters had much acting experience. Philippe Leroy, a professional soldier, was in his first film role, and Michel Constantin had been a professional volleyball player.

== Style ==
The black and white cinematography is by Ghislain Cloquet.

The scene where three different characters take turns breaking through the concrete floor of their cell is filmed in a single, nearly four minute long, shot.

There is no musical score except under the end credits.

The film has no opening credits.

== Reception ==
The Hole has a Rotten Tomatoes score of 94% based on 18 reviews, with an average score of 8.59/10. Dave Kehr, writing for Chicago Reader, hailed it as "the last great flowering of French classicism; the 'tradition of quality' here goes out with a masterpiece." The New York Times' Bosley Crowther noted that the non-professional actors "play their roles with such simple, natural force that they become not only bold adventurers but also deeply appreciable friends." "As long as men have been placed behind bars" wrote Kenneth Turan, "they've plotted to escape, and those plans have powered prison-break movies without end. But even in that large group, "Le Trou" stands apart."

Whilst praising the film otherwise, Richard Brody of The New Yorker wrote that Becker's "deeply empathetic, fanatically specific view of his protagonists leaves out some elements. [José] Giovanni was no common criminal—a Nazi collaborator, he blackmailed, tortured, and murdered Jews during, and even after, the Occupation. The charm of France’s underworld depended not just on criminals’ own code of silence but on Becker’s, and on all of France’s."

== See also ==
- A Man Escaped
