= Boot Hill (film) =

1969 film by Giuseppe Colizzi

- Italian theatrical release poster
- Directed by: Giuseppe Colizzi
- Screenplay by: Giuseppe Colizzi
- Story by: Giuseppe Colizzi
- Starring: Terence Hill; Bud Spencer; Woody Strode; Eduardo Ciannelli; Victor Buono; Lionel Stander
- Cinematography: Marcello Masciocchi
- Edited by: Tatiana Casini
- Music by: Carlo Rustichelli
- Production companies: San Marco; Crono Cinematografica
- Distributed by: Euro International Films; Film Ventures (US)
- Release date: 1969
- Running time: 87 minutes
- Country: Italy
- Box office: $1 million (North America)

Boot Hill (Italian: La collina degli stivali) is a 1969 Spaghetti Western film starring the film duo of Terence Hill and Bud Spencer. Boot Hill was the last film in a trilogy that started with God Forgives... I Don't! (1967), followed by Ace High (1968).

The film was re-released as Trinity Rides Again.

== Plot ==
One night in the Old West, a man named Cat tries to ride out of a town and is ambushed by a large number of men. He is wounded, but manages to lure them away and hides in a wagon belonging to a circus company. Outside town the wagons are searched by men who are shot by Cat and the trapeze artist Thomas, who is a former gunfighter.

Cat leaves the company as soon as he can travel. The same night men arrive and search the wagons during the show and discover traces of him. To retaliate they shoot down Thomas' partner Joe during their performance. Thomas finds Cat and nurses him back to health saying that he needs him as "bait for my trap". Cat takes him to Hutch, who lives in a house together with another big man, who is called Baby Doll and is a mute. Hutch receives Cat with hostility. Cat explains that Sharp, a friend of Hutch who is a prospector, needs help to stop mining boss Fisher from taking his claim, and that Cat had won the deed to the claim in a rigged poker game to be able to take it out of town (that is why he was attacked in the beginning). Hutch reluctantly agrees to come along, together with Baby Doll. They find the remnants of the circus with its manager Mami, refit it, and gather the artists.

At the mining town a county commissioner arrives to review the claims, but the miners are afraid to talk to him – except for the McGavin family, but they are besieged in their home and eventually destroyed with dynamite by the large outlaw band of Finch, who co-operates with Fisher. However, at night a message is delivered to the commissioner in his room by a dwarf from the circus.

In the morning the circus arrives, and the commissioner convinces Fisher to invite everybody to the show. At the circus show they perform pantomimes about the threat to the miners and the killing of the McGavins. The miners find guns under their seats, while Fisher's men find feathers. There is a fight and Fisher's men are killed. The four go out to face the might of the Finch gang in a nightly fight. They get help from the circus people (including dwarves and can-can dancers), and eventually the miners also join in and the gang is wiped out. Fisher shoots Mami in the back. Cat appears and says it means the gallows for Fisher unless he wants to try his luck with the gun. Fisher lays his down, and Mami says that makes him the real clown.

At the end Cat and Hutch ride away together, while Baby Doll, who has started talking, stays with one of the can-can dancers at the circus.

== Cast ==
- Terence Hill as Cat Stevens
- Bud Spencer as Hutch Bessy
- Woody Strode as Thomas
- George Eastman as Baby Doll
- Eduardo Ciannelli as Boone
- Glauco Onorato as Finch
- Alberto Dell'Acqua as Sam (storekeeper)
- Nazzareno Zamperla as Charlie (Finch's goon)
- Victor Buono as Honey Fisher
- Lionel Stander as Mami

== Release ==
Boot Hill was first released in 1969.

Wild East Productions released the 92-minute international version on an out-of-print limited edition DVD in 2003. In September 2015, the film was re-released as a double-bill with Django the Bastard from RetroVision Entertainment, LLC. It features both Italian and English audio.

Film Ventures bought the film for the US market for $40,000 and made over $1 million.

== Reception ==
From retrospective reviews, in his investigation of narrative structures in Spaghetti Western films, Bert Fridlund writes that all the Colizzi westerns present clever variations on several different kinds of partnerships encountered in other films inspired by For a Few Dollars More. Also, the pervading protagonists Cat and Hutch are differentiated by a set of physical and personal characteristics that reappear in the even more commercially successful They Call Me Trinity and Trinity Is Still My Name.

== Sources ==
- Grant, Kevin (2011). Any Gun Can Play. Fab Press. ISBN 9781903254615.
- Hughes, Howard (2010). Spaghetti Westerns. Harpenden: Kamera Books. ISBN 978-1-84243-303-4.
