= Chapi Chapo =

1974 French TV series

- Created by: Italo Bettiol; Stephano Lonati
- Country of origin: France
- No. of seasons: 3
- No. of episodes: 60

Production
- Running time: 5 minutes

Original release
- Network: TF1
- Release: 1974 – 1976

Chapi Chapo is a French short stop-motion series. Created by Italo Bettiol and Stephano Lonati for the production company Belokapi, with music by François de Roubaix, it premiered in 1974 on R(T)F Television (and later on Boomerang) and ran for 60 5-minute episodes.

The show aired on American television in the 1980s as part of Nickelodeon's Pinwheel.

"Chapi Chapo" is a play-on-words with the French word, chapeaux, which means "hats". Both of the main characters wore oversized hats that matched their clothing. The one in red is Chapi (a girl) and the one in blue is Chapo (a boy). Each episode ends with a little dance.

An announcement was made in 2015 that a new Chapi Chapo series is in development. It will be in CGI, and produced by Moving Puppet Studio.

== Episodes ==
Babelfish translation in parentheses

1. La Tapisserie (The Tapestry)
2. Le Rangement (The Cleanup)
3. Les Fleurs (The Flowers)
4. Le Ver à soie (The Silkworm)
5. La Cage (The Cage)
6. Les Bateaux (The Boats)
7. Le Jet d'eau (The Water Jet)
8. Le Potager (The Kitchen Garden)
9. L'Étoile (The Star)
10. Le Cube espiègle (The Mischievous Cube)
11. Le Bonhomme de neige (The Snowman)
12. Do ré mi (The Music)
13. La Course d'autos (The Cars Race)
14. Le Diablotin (The Imp)
15. La Fée (The Fairy)
16. La Balance (The Balance)
17. Le Cube magique (The Magic Cube)
18. La Corrida (The Bullfight)
19. Le Mouton (The Sheep)
20. Le Saut en hauteur (The High Jump)
21. Le Pantin (The Puppet)
22. Le Nuage (The Cloud)
23. L'Hippopotame (The Hippopotamus)
24. La Balançoire (The Swing)
25. La Lecture (Reading)
26. Le Phoque (The Seal)
27. La Baguette magique (The Magic Wand)
28. Les Patins à roulettes (The Roller Skates)
29. Le Gâteau (The Cake); features a cow, Miel (Honey)
30. Le Lapin (The Rabbit)
31. La Gymnastique (The Gymnastics)
32. Le Martien (The Martian)
33. La Perruque (The Wig)
34. Cache-cache (Hide-and-Seek)
35. Le Nid (The Nest)
36. Le Cerf-volant (The Kite)
37. Jeu de cubes (Playing With Cubes)
38. La Danse des cubes (Dance of the Cubes)
39. L'Épouvantail (The Scarecrow)
40. La Tortue et l'Escargot (The Tortoise and the Snail)
41. Le Trésor (The Treasure)
42. La Multiplication (Multiplication)
43. Jeu de Martien (Playing With The Martian)
44. Le Puzzle (The Puzzle)
45. Le Repas (The Meal)
46. La Pyramide (The Pyramid)
47. Le Lion (The Lion)
48. Le Chien (The Dog)
49. La Promenade du chien (Walking the Dog)
50. Jeu de phoques (Playing With Seals)
51. La Peau de lion (Skin of Lion)
52. Les Œufs (The Eggs)
53. Les Cris d'animaux (Animal Sounds)
54. L'Arbre (The Tree)
55. Le Dompteur (The Trainer)
56. Le Théâtre (The Theatre)
57. Le Robot (The Robot)
58. Le Funambule (The Tightrope Walker)
59. L'Avion (The Plane)
60. Le Train (The Train)

== Music ==
- Music : François de Roubaix
- Words : Charles Level

The lyrics are a combination of nonsense words.

Chapi Chapo — patapo
Chapo Chapi — patapi
Piripipi rabada dada
Dada dada
Pacha pacho — pitipo
Pacho pacha — pitipa
Piripipi rabada dida
