= The Break (Giovanni novel) =

1957 novel by José Giovanni

- Author: José Giovanni
- Original title: Le Trou
- Translator: Robin Campbell
- Language: French
- Publisher: Éditions Gallimard
- Publication date: 1957
- Publication place: France
- English publication date: 1960
- Pages: 236

The Break (French: Le Trou) is a 1957 novel by the French writer and Nazi collaborator José Giovanni. It is based on a real escape attempt from the La Santé Prison in 1947. It was Giovanni's debut novel. An English translation by Robin Campbell was published in 1960.

== Adaptation ==
The book was adapted by Jacques Becker into the film The Hole. The film starred Michel Constantin, Jean Keraudy (an ex-convict who performed as a character based on himself) and Philippe Leroy. It premiered on 18 March 1960.
