= A Man Named Rocca =

- Directed by: Jean Becker
- Screenplay by: Jean Becker; José Giovanni
- Based on: novel L'Excommunié by José Giovanni
- Produced by: Adry De Carbuccia; Roland Girard
- Starring: Jean Paul Belmondo
- Cinematography: Ghislain Cloquet
- Edited by: Denise de Casabianca
- Music by: Claude Normand
- Distributed by: Pathé Consortium Cinéma
- Release date: 1961
- Running time: 102 minutes
- Country: France
- Language: French
- Box office: 1,193,387 admissions (France)

A Man Named Rocca (French: Un nommé La Rocca, Italian: Quello che spara per primo) is a 1961 French-Italian crime-thriller film directed by Jean Becker and starring Jean Paul Belmondo. It is based on the 1958 novel L'Excommunié by José Giovanni. Belmondo appeared in another film version of this novel in 1972, directed by Giovanni, called Bad Luck.

== Plot ==
Roberto La Rocca is an ex-gangster who is told by "The Mexican" that his friend Xavier Adé has been imprisoned for a murder he did not commit. He goes to Marseilles to meet Adé's partner Villanova.

Rocca suspect that Villanova is involved in the frame up and seduces his mistress Maud. He shoots and kills Villanova and takes over the gambling club run by Xavier and Villanova.

Rocca falls in love with Adé's sister, Genevieve. Xavier is found guilty and sentenced to ten years in prison. When gangsters threaten the club, Rocca shoots them and is sentenced to prison too.

In prison, Rocca and Xavier volunteer to clear land mines. Xavier loses an arm because of this. When they get out, Rocca and Genevieve plan to buy a farm together. However, Genevieve is killed in a shoot out caused by Xavier. The friendship between Rocca and Xavier is over.

== Cast ==
- Jean-Paul Belmondo as Roberto La Rocca
- Christine Kaufmann as Geneviève Adé
- Pierre Vaneck as Xavier Adé
- Béatrice Altariba as Maud
- Henri Virlogeux as Ficelle
- Pedro Serano as Migli
- Mario David as Charlot l'élégant
- Charles Moulin as Cipriano
- Jean-Pierre Darras as Nevada
- Claude Piéplu as le directeur de la prison
- Michel Constantin as le chef des racketteurs américains
- Frédéric Lambre as Fanfan
- Claude Jaeger as Fernand l'Italien
- Gérard Hernandez as un détenu démineur
- Henri Arius as le chef responsible du cachot de la prison
- Edmond Beauchamp as l'avocat de Xavier
- Jacques Léonard as le joueur qui refuse de partir
- Dominique Zardi as le prisonnier sautant sur une mine
- Leroy Haynes
- Nico as sunbathing model
