= La Scoumoune =

- Directed by: José Giovanni
- Screenplay by: José Giovanni
- Based on: L'Excommunié by José Giovanni
- Starring: Jean Paul Belmondo; Claudia Cardinale
- Cinematography: Andréas Winding
- Edited by: Françoise Javet
- Music by: François de Roubaix
- Production companies: Lira Films; Praesidens
- Release dates: December 13, 1972 (France); October 28, 1973 (Italy)
- Running time: 106 minutes
- Countries: France; Italy
- Budget: 9.2 million francs
- Box office: 1,966,700 admissions (France)

La Scoumoune (lit. 'Evil Eye') is a 1972 film directed by José Giovanni. It stars Jean Paul Belmondo, Claudia Cardinale and Michel Constantin. It is an adaptation of Giovanni's novel L'Excommunié.

La Scoumoune is a remake of a 1961 film A Man Named Rocca, directed by Jean Becker, also based on Giovanni's novel and starring Belmondo in the same part.

== Plot ==
In the mid-1930s mobster Roberto La Rocca (Jean-Paul Belmondo) comes to Marseille to help his friend who was framed by the local crime bosses. Roberto is caught up in clashes between different gangs and as a result serves a long sentence in prison for the murder of several enemy gang members. Once in prison he begins to prepare his escape.

== Cast ==
- Jean-Paul Belmondo : Roberto Borgo
- Claudia Cardinale : Georgia Saratov
- Michel Constantin : Xavier Saratov
- Enrique Lucero : Migli
- Alain Mottet : Ficelle
- Michel Peyrelon : Handsome Charlot
- Philippe Brizard : Fanfan
- Aldo Bufi Landi : Villanova
- Jacques Debary : Carl
- Gérard Depardieu : Burglar
- Marc Eyraud : Bonnaventure
- Andréa Ferréol : The angry prostitute
- Henri Vilbert : Graville
- Jacques Rispal: Monsieur Dubois
- Nicolas Vogel : Grégoire
- Jean-Claude Michel : The lawyer
- Dominique Zardi : The convict
- Pierre Collet : The prison director
- Luciano Catenacci : friend of Villanova from Spain

== Production ==
According to director José Giovanni, Jean-Paul Belmondo's business associate René Chateau asked him if the rights to Giovanni's novel L'Excommunié had reverted back to the author. The novel had previously published in 1958 and adapted into film by Jean Becker as A Man Named Rocca (1961). On learning that the rights had returned to the owner, Chateau asked if he would be willing to remake the film with Belmondo.

The film was budgeted at 9.2 million francs and began shooting on May 2, 1972 in the south of France.

== Release ==
La Scoumoune on December 13, 1972 in France. It had 1,966,700 entries in France. It was released in Italy as Il clan dei marsigliesi on October 28, 1972.

For the films release in the United Kingdom, it was cut down to 97 minutes and released in a dubbed version as The Hit Man on March 28, 1974. A reviewer in the Monthly Film Bulletin described the dub as "a disgrace."
