= Le deuxième souffle (novel) =

1958 novel by José Giovanni

- Pocket edition cover, featuring an image from the 1966 film adaptation
- Author: José Giovanni
- Language: French
- Publisher: Éditions Gallimard
- Publication date: 1958
- Publication place: France
- Pages: 253

Le deuxième souffle (lit. 'The Second Wind') is a 1958 crime novel by the French writer José Giovanni.

== Plot summary ==
It is about the aging French gangster Gustave "Gu" Minda who escapes from prison and becomes entangled in a plot to rob a security van in Marseille. It was Giovanni's second novel, and was published in the Série noire collection of éditions Gallimard.

== Adaptations ==
The novel is the basis for the 1966 film Le deuxième souffle directed by Jean-Pierre Melville and its 2007 remake The Second Wind directed by Alain Corneau.
