= Last Known Address =

- Directed by: José Giovanni
- Written by: José Giovanni
- Produced by: Jacques Bar
- Starring: Lino Ventura; Marlène Jobert
- Cinematography: Étienne Becker
- Edited by: Kenout Peltier
- Music by: François de Roubaix
- Distributed by: Valoria Films
- Release date: February 25, 1970
- Running time: 102 minutes
- Countries: France; Italy
- Language: French

Last Known Address (French: Dernier domicile connu) is a 1970 film directed by José Giovanni. This movie is based on the eponymous novel The Last Known Address by Joseph Harrington.

Its theme tune, composed by François de Roubaix, has subsequently been sampled in several songs, such as "All n My Grill" by Missy Elliott and "Supreme" by Robbie Williams.

== Plot ==
Marceau Léonetti (Lino Ventura), a competent and energetic officer stops by chance the son of an influential lawyer driving under the influence of alcohol. A few months later, the lawyer falsely accuses Léonetti as being violent and incompetent. As a result, Marceau is transferred to a small police station, where the height of his investigative exploits is recovering a young boys stolen pigeons.

Contacted by an old colleague of his, who is now head of a special crime unit, Léonetti is enlisted into the unit. There he meets young and beautiful police officer Jeanne (Marlène Jobert), and the pair are tasked with catching perverts who sexually harass young women in cinemas, in a sting operation with Jeanne acting as bait.

Léonetti is given another assignment, to locate and arrest Roger Martin (Philippe March), the only witness to a crime, who can testify at the murder trial of a master criminal Soramon (Guy Héron). The prosecution's only other witness has died of a serious illness. Without his testimony, Soramon will go free, but no-one knows where Martin is. The police only have an old address for him, Cité de la Glaciére. Léonetti and Jeanne try to find him by locating his old furniture, which he sold when he moved.

In the process of their investigations, the pair discover Martin may have a young daughter, and that she took medication in the form of blue pills, a clue which may lead them to Martin. Meanwhile criminal associates of Soramon are tailing Léonetti and Jeanne, in the hope that they will discover Martin's whereabouts. The existence of a daughter is confirmed by Martin's former neighbour.

After questioning residents of the area and many leads which go nowhere, Léonetti thinks that he could examine the records of pharmacies in the area to find the daughter's pill prescription. After a long search, on the first day of Soramon's trial, they finally find the record, which leads them to Martin's doctor.

Leaving the pharmacy with the address, Léonetti and Jeanne split up, but Léonetti is attacked by the gang, he fights them off but is badly beaten and left in the street. The gang steal what they believe to be the note with the doctor's address on, but Léonetti has outsmarted them and given the address to Jeanne. Jeanne nurses Léonetti back to health after his ordeal.

At the doctors, they are frustrated to learn that he only has Martin's old address on record. However the doctor informs them that Martin and his daughter have an appointment at his surgery that day. Léonetti apprehends Martin leaving the surgery. Martin and his daughter are taken to a hotel under police protection, and he testifies at the trial the next day. However, after he has given his evidence, the police leave him alone and unguarded, and he is assassinated in the park by one of Saramon's gang, in view of his daughter.

Jeanne tells Léonetti she is completely disillusioned with police work, for them allowing the death of Martin to happen, and doesn't think getting Soramon's conviction was worth it. When he responds bluntly to her outburst, Jeanne coldly says goodbye to Léonetti and drives away. The film ends with the quotation "...for life is a wasted blessing/ when we have not lived it/as we would have liked", misattributed to the Romanian poet Mihai Eminescu. (In fact, the lines are from the poem "Decebal către popor" by another Romanian poet, George Coșbuc.)

== Cast ==
- Lino Ventura: Inspector Marceau Leonetti
- Marlène Jobert: Jeanne Dumas
- Philippe March: Roger Martin
- Michel Constantin: Greg
- Alain Mottet: Frank Lambert
- Béatrice Arnac: Silvia
- Gilette Barbier: l’épicière
- Luc Bartholomé: Jo Raison
- Paul Crauchet: Jacques Loring
- Monique Mélinand: Mme Loring
- Albert Dagnant: Arnold
- Germaine Delbat: Mme Lenoir
- Roger Desmare: The grocer
- Max Desrau: Thouin
- Robert Favart: The Principal
- Guy Héron: Soramon
