= Adolphe Sylvain =

French-Tahitian photographer

- Born: 1920; Paris, France
- Died: 1991 (aged 70–71)
- Occupations: Photographer, and photojournalist
- Spouse: Jeanine Tehani Vidal
- Children: Moea, Vaea, Hina, Teva, Maima

Adolphe Sylvain (1920–1991) was a French-Tahitian photographer, best known for his black-and-white photographs of Tahiti and Tahitian models.

== Biography ==
Adolphe Sylvain (whose birth name is Adolphe) is one of Tahiti’s leading photojournalists. With a degree in civil engineering, Sylvain discovered Tahiti at the age of twenty-six. There, he established Radio Tahiti, followed by a photography shop. In 1969, he and his family produced a TV series titled Téva: Operation Gauguin, with his son, Téva, playing the lead role. This television series, broadcast in 1970 on a mainland channel, helped launch color television. Around the same time, the destruction of his photographic archives in a fire caused him to step away from this type of work for a while.
