= Giuseppe Colizzi =

Italian film director, writer and producer (1925–1978)

- Born: 28 June 1925; Rome, Italy
- Died: 23 August 1978 (aged 53); Rome, Italy
- Occupations: Film director, screenwriter

Giuseppe Colizzi (28 June 1925 – 23 August 1978) was an Italian film director, writer and producer.

Colizzi was best known for his films starring Bud Spencer and Terence Hill, mostly spaghetti westerns.

== Filmography ==
- Beautiful Families (1964)
- Dio perdona... Io no! (1967); a.k.a. Blood River (US); God Forgives... (US); a.k.a. God Forgives... I Don't! (US)
- I quattro dell'Ave Maria (1968); a.k.a. Ace High (UK) (US); a.k.a. Four Gunmen of Ave Maria; Have Gun Will Travel (UK)
- La collina degli stivali (1969); a.k.a. Boot Hill (US); a.k.a. Boot Hill: Trinity Rides Again (US: video box title); a.k.a. Trinity Rides Again
- Arrivano Joe e Margherito (1974); a.k.a. Run, Run, Joe!
- Più forte, ragazzi! (1972); a.k.a. All the Way Boys (US); a.k.a. Plane Crazy (US)
- Switch (1979) (posthumous)
