= Hubert de Lapparent =

French actor (1919–2021)

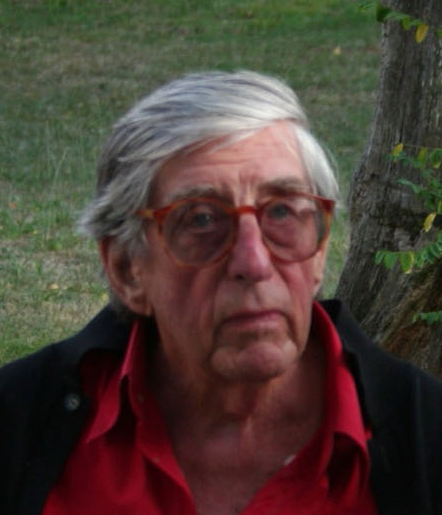
De Lapparent in 2006

Hubert de Lapparent (19 April 1919 – 14 September 2021) was a French actor.

== Early life and education ==
Hubert Cochon de Lapparent was born in 1919. He was the son of the geologist Jacques de Lapparent and nephew of the painter Paul de Lapparent. In the 1930s, he entered the conservatory. He participated in the resistance during the Second World War.
