= God Forgives... I Don't! =

1967 film

God Forgives… I Don't!
- Italian theatrical release poster
- Directed by: Giuseppe Colizzi
- Screenplay by: Giuseppe Colizzi
- Story by: Giuseppe Colizzi
- Starring: Terence Hill; Frank Wolff; Bud Spencer; Gina Rovere
- Cinematography: Alfio Contini
- Edited by: Sergio Montanari
- Music by: Carlo Rustichelli
- Production companies: Crono Cinematografica; P.E.F.S.A. Films
- Distributed by: Indipendenti Regionali
- Release date: 31 October 1967 (Italy)
- Countries: Italy; Spain
- Budget: $300,000

God Forgives… I Don't! (Italian: Dio perdona… io no!) is a 1967 Spaghetti Western film directed and written by Giuseppe Colizzi. Starring the film duo of Terence Hill and Bud Spencer. The film is the first in a trilogy, followed by Ace High and Boot Hill.

== Plot ==
Bill San Antonio accuses his old friend and partner Cat of cheating at cards. Bill's henchman, Bud, tosses a gun to Cat. Bill orders the others out and tells his henchman Bud to set fire to the house. Then they have a stand-up duel and Bill falls. When Cat emerges from the house the gang follows Bill's orders – Cat is allowed to leave. There is a funeral, though a burned body cannot be identified. After the funeral the men find that the loot of the gang is missing, and Bud says that Cat must have stolen it. On several occasions Cat is attacked by gang members and kills them, while Bud disappears.

This is told in flashbacks during the film. The story as shown begins with a train running into a town, filled with dead bodies. This train has been robbed and its passengers massacred, but one survivor identifies Bill San Antonio, though Bill had been supposed to be dead, shot by Cat in a duel. Cat is told this by Hutch, an old acquaintance who is now an insurance agent. Cat remembers that the gun he used in the duel was handed to him by Bud. He sneaks away at night with Hutch's horse and leaves it further on. Cat searches – followed at a distance by Hutch – and eventually finds the hideout of Bill's new gang. When sneaking into the house Cat is caught, but saved by Hutch. Using Hutch's considerable strength, they remove the box with the gold taken from the train, and hide it down in the ground by some cliffs. Then the two fall out, because Cat wants more than the percentage offered by the insurance company. As shots may draw the attention of the gang, they fight it out without weapons. Cat swings in a tree and kicks Hutch several times until Hutch finally knocks Cat out cold. Still dizzy, Hutch looks up to find that Bill and his men have arrived.

The two are tortured by what Bill knows that they can't stand, Cat by water and Hutch by fire, but they won't tell where the gold is. When Bill and most of the gang temporarily leave (to meet his secret partner), Cat suggests to Bud (who has been recently whipped by Bill for being too conspicuous in the nearby village and also blamed for the surviving witness at the train massacre) that he can lead him to the gold. After Cat digs up the box of gold, Bud is about to shoot him but Cat throws a knife lying by the box and kills Bud.

When Bill returns he sends his gang to search for Cat. Bill and two bandits find Cat in a cantina in the nearby Mexican village. After his two companions have been shot by Cat, Bill – held at gunpoint – suggests that they share the money, and forget Hutch. At Bill's lair the three men that are left there try to get the information from Hutch, but the man Bill assigned to guard Hutch, refuses to open the door. While Tago is occupied, Hutch breaks the wooden beam that he is bound to and beats him down. Then Hutch shoots the men when they break in through the door.

At the place of the gold, Cat intends to reproduce his first duel with Bill, but with dynamite instead of fire. While the fuse burns away, they move into position to draw, but are interrupted by Hutch, who is holding a rifle and tells them to drop their guns. He asks about the gold. When Cat says that the box is there but the content may not be the same, he tries to open the box while keeping an eye on the two. The fuse keeps on burning, and Bill draws a hidden derringer and shoots Hutch, but a hidden knife thrown by Cat wounds his hand. The two pick up their revolvers and shoot. Cat wounds Bill's other hand (that he drew with) and also shoots both his knees. While Bill crawls towards the kegs of dynamite and tries to bite off the fuse with his teeth, Cat carries the unconscious Hutch to cover. Then there is a big explosion.

In the concluding scene Hutch comes to, lying on the wagon with the bags of gold. Cat says that he has to have a bullet taken out of his head and that they will discuss the fate of the gold when Hutch is strong enough to hold a gun.

== Cast ==
- Terence Hill as Cat "Pretty Face" Stevens
- Frank Wolff as Bill "Dead Man" San Antonio
- Bud Spencer as Hutch "Jackass" Bessy
- Gina Rovere as Rose
- José Manuel Martín as Bud
- Luis Barboo as Full-Bearded Henchman
- Tito García as "Tam-Tam"
- Frank Braña as Lou, smoking poker player with moustache
- Joaquín Blanco
- Antonietta Fiorito
- Paco Sanz as Full-Bearded, Fawning Informant With Glasses
- Franco Gula as Gravedigger / Clockmaker
- José Canalejas as Mexican Henchman
- Bruno Arie as Older poker Player With No Moustache
- Remo Capitani as Publican In Saloon
- Antonio Decembrino
- Juan Olaguibel as Targo
- Giovanna Lenzi
- Roberto Alessandri as Poker Player With Moustache On Cat's Right
- Giancarlo Bastianoni as Poker Player On Cat's Left With No Moustache
- Rufino Inglés as Old Mexican In Taverna
- Arturo Fuento
- José Terrón as "Flatface", San Antonio Henchman

== Production ==
God Forgives... I Don't! was prepared under the working title of The Dog, the Cat and the Fox. The film was shot on location in Almería with interiors shot at Elios Studios. Peter Martell was chosen as the leading actor, but the day before the first shoot he broke his foot and was replaced by Terence Hill, which started Hill's successful partnership with Bud Spencer.

== Release ==
God Forgives... I Don't! was released in Bologna, Italy on 31 October 1967. It was released in the United Kingdom as Blood River.

The film was released by American International Pictures in May 1969.

== Reception ==
From contemporary reviews, "Whit." of Variety stated that the film is "long on action and short on story line" noting "if the subsequent action were as suspenseful as a long and tenseful poker game which opens film, American International which is distributing pic in this country, would have a sure western b.o. winner".

It was the highest grossing domestic film of that year.

From retrospective reviews, film critic Dennis Schwartz panned the film, writing: "It's the first of 19 times that Terence Hill and Bud Spencer would be paired together. This muddled film is one of their poorer efforts – it's poorly paced, overlong, tedious and humorless. I didn't find a thing about it enjoyable. But those who have a strong stomach for all the dumb violence and can overlook the awkward execution of the story, may be the ones best suited for this bloody awful film".

In his investigation of narrative structures in Spaghetti Western films, Fridlund writes that all the Colizzi westerns present clever variations on several different kinds of partnerships encountered in other films inspired by For a Few Dollars More. What is notable is that the pervading protagonists Cat and Hutch are differentiated by a set of physical and personal characteristics that reappear in the even more commercially successful They Call Me Trinity and Trinity Is Still My Name.
