= The Second Wind =

- Directed by: Alain Corneau
- Written by: Alain Corneau
- Based on: Le deuxième souffle by Jean-Pierre Melville and José Giovanni; Le deuxième souffle by José Giovanni
- Produced by: Laurent Pétin; Michèle Pétin
- Starring: Daniel Auteuil; Monica Bellucci; Michel Blanc; Jacques Dutronc; Eric Cantona
- Cinematography: Yves Angelo
- Edited by: Marie-Josèphe Yoyotte
- Music by: Bruno Coulais
- Distributed by: ARP Sélection
- Release date: 24 October 2007
- Running time: 155 minutes
- Country: France
- Language: French
- Budget: $22 million
- Box office: $4.2 million

The Second Wind (French: Le Deuxième Souffle) is a 2007 French crime film directed by Alain Corneau and starring Daniel Auteuil and Monica Bellucci. It is based on José Giovanni's 1958 crime novel, and a remake of the previous 1966 film adaptation.

== Cast ==
- Daniel Auteuil - Gustave 'Gu' Minda
- Monica Bellucci - Simona - a.k.a. 'Manouche'
- Michel Blanc - Inspector Blot
- Jacques Dutronc - Stanislas Orloff
- Eric Cantona - Alban
- Daniel Duval - Venture Ricci
- Gilbert Melki - Jo Ricci
- Nicolas Duvauchelle - Antoine
- Jacques Bonnaffé - Pascal
- Philippe Nahon - Commissaire Fardiano
- Jean-Paul Bonnaire - Théo, le passeur
- Jean-Claude Dauphin - le notaire
- Francis Renaud - Letourneur

== See also ==
- Le deuxième souffle (1966)
