= Italo Bettiol =

Italian-French film director (1926–2022)

- Born: 31 July 1926; Trieste, Italy
- Died: 28 December 2022 (aged 96); Aniane, France
- Occupation: Film director

Italo Bettiol (31 July 1926 – 28 December 2022) was an Italian-French film director.

== Biography ==
Bettiol left Italy in 1947 with his brother, Stefano, and emigrated to France in hopes of becoming a painter. Alongside their friend, Stefano Lonati, the trio began working in film animation, notably creating advertisements with puppets produced by "Les Cinéastes associés" in the 1950s. He became a specialist in stop motion. He gained notoriety through animated television series, working alongside Lonati in the series Pépin la bulle and Chapi Chapo.

In 1968, Bettiol founded the animation studio Bélokapi alongside Lonati, Michel Karlof, and Nicole Pichon. After his retirement, he worked on gadgets in his workshop with his wife, Françoise.

Italo Bettiol died in Aniane on 28 December 2022, at the age of 96. His death was announced by the Société Magic.

== Filmography ==
=== Screenwriter ===
- Albert et Barnabé
- Chapi Chapo
- Le Jardinier Antoine
- Le Jongleur de Notre-Dame
- Les Engrenages
- Les Kanapoutz
- Les Viratatoums
- Trajectoires
- Variations

=== Director ===
- Chapi Chapo
- Les Engrenages
- Les Viratatoums
- Pépin la bulle
