= Sofracima =

French film production company

Sofracima was a French film production company, owned and managed by the film maker Catherine Winter. The company was responsible for the 1970 production Girl Slaves of Morgana Le Fay. Sofracima was the plaintiff in a 1979 court case against screenwriter Christopher Frank, where the company argued successfully that the script produced by Frank was so different from the original book by Claude Brami (of which Sofracima owned the rights) that his work was deemed defective; the court thus resisted a trend at the time of allowing "an extensive liberty of transformation".
