= José Giovanni =

French writer, filmmaker and criminal (1923-2004)

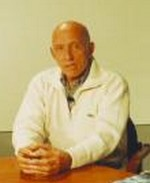
- Giovanni in 2001
- Born: Joseph Damiani; July 22, 1923; Paris, France
- Died: April 24, 2004 (aged 80); Lausanne, Vaud, Switzerland
- Citizenship: France; Switzerland (after 1986)
- Occupations: Author; screenwriter; film director
- Writing career
- Language: French
- Genre: Crime fiction
- Criminal information
- Convictions: Murder, collaboration with the enemy, blackmail
- Penalty: Death (commuted), 30 years imprisonment (commuted to 11.5 years total confinement), Dégradation nationale (rehabilitated 1984)

Joseph Damiani (22 June 1923 – 24 April 2004), known by the pen name José Giovanni, was a French writer, filmmaker, and convicted criminal. He became known for his realistic, gritty crime novels which drew upon his own personal experiences and knowledge of the French underworld.

As a young man, Giovanni was a fascist activist and Nazi collaborator during World War II, also becoming affiliated with organized crime during the same period. In 1948, he received the death penalty for his involvement in a murder case, though the sentence was commuted. Following his release from prison, Giovanni became a popular author of crime fiction beginning in the 1960s. Several of his novels were adapted into films by directors like Jacques Becker, Jean-Pierre Melville, and Claude Sautet. Giovanni also wrote original screenplays, and eventually turned to directing, helming some 17 films between 1967 and 2001. Many films written or directed by Giovanni, as well as films adapted from his books, were box-office successes, and some came to be regarded as classics of French cinema.

Giovanni's works often praise masculine friendships and advocated the confrontation of the individual against the world. Though he never concealed his criminal past, he was always careful to hide his links with the Nazi occupiers of France during World War II. His past as a collaborator was eventually exposed in 1993 by the Swiss newspapers Tribune de Genève and 24 Heures.

== Early life ==
Of Corsican descent, Joseph Damiani received a good education, studying at the Collège Stanislas de Paris and the Lycée Janson de Sailly. His father, a professional gambler who was sentenced to a year in prison for running an illegal casino, owned a hotel in the French Alps in Chamonix. Damiani worked there as a young man and became fascinated by mountain climbing.

== Criminal activity and collaboration ==
=== Wartime activities ===
From April to September 1943, during the Nazi occupation of France, Damiani was a member of Jeunesse et Montagne (Youth and Mountain) in Chamonix, part of the Vichy Government youth movement controlled by Pierre Laval.

In February 1944, Damiani came to Paris and through his father's friend, the LVF leader Simon Sabiani, he joined Jacques Doriot's fascist French Popular Party (PPF). His maternal uncle, Ange Paul Santolini alias "Santos", who ran a restaurant patronized by the Gestapo, and his elder brother, Paul Damiani, a member of the Vichy paramilitary Milice, introduced Joseph into the Pigalle underworld.

In March 1944, Damiani went to Marseille where he became a member of the German Schutzkorps (SK), an organization which hunted down Service du travail obligatoire - STO (Compulsory Work Service) dodgers. He served as bodyguard to its Marseille chief and took part in many arrests, often blackmailing his victims.

In Lyon, in August 1944, posing as a German police officer along with an accomplice (Orloff, a Gestapo agent who was shot for treason at the Liberation), Damiani blackmailed Joseph Gourentzeig and his brother-in-law Georges Edberg, two Jews who were in hiding. Gourentzeig had bribed a member of the Milice - a friend of Damiani’s – in an attempt to secure his parents' release from a detention camp. They were not freed and Gourentzeig's father, Jacob, was shot by the Germans shortly after, on 21 August 1944, along with 109 Jewish hostages in the Bron (Lyon airport) massacre.

=== 1945 triple murder ===
On 18 May 1945, shortly after the end of the war in Europe, Damiani, his brother Paul, Georges Accad, a former Gestapo agent, and Jacques Ménassole, a former member of the Milice wearing a French Army lieutenant's uniform - all posing as Military Intelligence officers - kidnapped Haïm Cohen, a wine merchant, accusing him of being a black marketeer. He was tortured until he gave them the key to his safe and a check for 105,000 francs. He was then shot and his body thrown into the Seine. Damiani cashed the check at Barclay's Bank under the identity of "Count J. de Montreuil".

A few days later, on 31 May 1945, the same gang, still masquerading as French Army Intelligence, abducted two brothers, Jules and Roger Peugeot, electrical appliance manufacturers in Maisons-Alfort. The brothers were forced, at gunpoint, to write a letter stating that they had been in business with the Germans and in contact with the Gestapo. The gang then demanded a million francs for destroying the letter. The Peugeot brothers refused and were tortured until they revealed where they had hidden 125 Louis d'or gold coins. They were then shot and their bodies buried in the woods near Versailles.

Damiani, who had accidentally shot himself in the leg during the struggle with the Peugeot brothers, was arrested at home in early June 1945. Accad was also apprehended. On 12 June 1945 Ménassole, on the point of being arrested, committed suicide in the Rue Montmartre métro station. Paul Damiani was arrested in Strasbourg in July 1945, escaped in December and was shot dead in a gunfight between gangsters on 17 July 1946 in a bar in Nice.

=== Convictions and prison sentence ===
Following his arrest, Damiani received a series of sentence.

On 20 July 1946, he was sentenced to twenty years hard labor for collaboration with the enemy by the Marseille Court of Justice, over his participation in the German Schutzkorps and in the arrest of Frenchmen sent to the STO (Compulsory Work Service) in Germany. He was also sentenced to Dégradation nationale (deprivation of all civil rights) for life for having been a member of the PPF fascist party.

During the investigation, Damiani had admitted to shooting Roger Peugeot, but he denied it in court. On 10 July 1948, Damiani and Georges Accad were sentenced to death by the Paris Cour d'Assises for the premeditated murders of Haïm Cohen, Roger Peugeot and Jules Peugeot. Damiani escaped the guillotine when his and Accad's sentences were commuted by President Vincent Auriol on 3 March 1949 to hard labor for life.

On 25 May 1949, Damiani was sentenced by the Paris Correctional Tribunal to ten years imprisonment for having blackmailed at gunpoint Joseph Gourentzeig (then hiding from the Gestapo under the name "André Courent") and his brother-in-law Georges Edberg in Lyon on 11 August 1944.

On 14 November 1951, Damiani's sentence was reduced to twenty years hard labor. Ultimately, President René Coty remitted the sentence on 30 November 1956. Damiani was released from prison at the age of thirty-three on 4 December 1956, after serving eleven and a half years.

== Writing ==
Straight after his release from prison, Damiani wrote his first novel, The Break (Le Trou), under the name of "José Giovanni". It tells of the escape he attempted from prison with four other inmates by digging a tunnel from their cell into the Paris sewers in 1947 when he was awaiting trial for murder. His lawyer, who had encouraged him to write, took the book to author and editor Roger Nimier through whom it was published by Éditions Gallimard. The novel was turned into a film by Jacques Becker in 1960.

In 1958 the editor Marcel Duhamel introduced Giovanni into the Série noire publishing imprint, where he came to notice with the publication of three novels that same year:

- Classe tous risques, which was filmed by Claude Sautet in 1960.
- L'Excommunié, which Jean Becker adapted into the film Un nommé La Rocca starring Jean-Paul Belmondo in 1961, and was later remade by Giovanni in 1972 as La Scoumoune, with Belmondo in the same part and Claudia Cardinale.
- Le deuxieme souffle (Second Breath), filmed by Jean-Pierre Melville in 1966, with a remake, Le deuxième souffle, by Alain Corneau.

José Giovanni wrote twenty-one novels and a volume of memoirs (Mes Grandes Gueules). He often drew his inspiration from personal experience or from real gangsters, such as Abel Danos in his 1960 film Classe tous risques, overlooking that they had been members of the French Gestapo.

== Filmmaking ==
After working with Jacques Becker on the screen adaptation of The Break, Giovanni wrote thirty-three film scripts and directed fifteen movies, working with many major French film stars of the time including Jean Gabin, Alain Delon, Lino Ventura and Jean-Paul Belmondo.

His film work included adapting his own books into screenplays; he also produced original screenplays and adapted the work of other authors, in projects such as the 1969 film The Sicilian Clan starring Gabin, Delon and Ventura, which became a massive box-office success in France. Upon his death, Le Monde called him one of the "symbols" of French post-war mainstream cinema.

== Revelation of his past ==
In January 1984, Giovanni was declared "rehabilitated". This did not absolve him as there was no retrial, but it restored his civil rights.

Throughout his lifetime, though he took pride in being a former gangster and having been on death row, Giovanni never elaborated about the motivations behind his death sentence, which would have involved mentioning that his past offenses included collaborating with the Nazis and extorting money from Jews during the Occupation.

On 14 October 1993, two Swiss dailies, La Tribune de Genève and 24 Heures, revealed his past and that Giovanni was in fact the same person as convicted collaborator and murderer Joseph Damiani. At first Giovanni denied the accusations, claiming he had helped the Résistance and insisting tha the crime he had been sentenced to death for was unrelated to collaboration with the Nazis. He threatened to sue the press for slander but never did. Ultimately, he stated : "I've paid. I am entitled to forgiveness and oblivion".

== Later life ==
Giovanni defended right-wing values, the family, law and order and tougher punishment but was a staunch opponent of the death penalty. However, he believed in personal vengeance: "Any man that snatches a child from its mother's arms deserves death".

In his last years he spent time visiting prisons lecturing on crime and rehabilitation. His final film, Mon père, il m'a sauvé la vie, was autobiographical of his war years and places the responsibility for the murders with his uncle Ange Paul Santolini.

From 1968 on, he lived in the Swiss village of Marécottes, not far from Chamonix. He became a naturalized Swiss citizen in 1986. He died from a brain haemorrhage on 24 April 2004 in Lausanne.

== Legacy ==
In July 2013, nine years after his death, historian and publisher Franck Lhomeau published in the journal Temps Noir a summary of the various cases that led to Giovanni's convictions, as well as an interview with writer/filmmaker Bertrand Tavernier, who had been his longtime press agent.

In 2024, writer and historian Gilles Antonowicz published José Giovanni, Story of a Redemption, which revisits Giovanni's criminal past and attempts to place the events in their historical context.

== Books ==
- 1957: Le Trou (The Break)
- 1958: Le Deuxième Souffle (Second Breath)
- 1958: Classe tous risque (Consider All Risks)
- 1958: L'Excommunié
- 1959: Histoire de fou
- 1960: Les aventuriers (The Adventurers)
- 1962: Le Haut-Fer (High Fear)
- 1964: Ho!
- 1969: Meurtre au sommet n°866 (Murder on Summit 866)
- 1969: Le Ruffian (The Ruffian)
- 1977: Mon ami le traître
- 1978: Le Musher (The Great Husky Race)
- 1982: Les Loups entre eux
- 1984: Un vengeur est passé
- 1985: Le Tueur de dimanche
- 1987: Tu boufferas ta cocarde
- 1995: Il avait dans le cœur des jardins introuvables (My Father Saved My Life) - Memoirs
- 1997: La Mort du poisson rouge (The Death of the Goldfish)
- 1998: Le Prince sans étoile
- 1999: Chemins fauves (Favorite Paths)
- 2001: Les Gosses d'abord
- 2002: Mes grandes gueules - Memoirs
- 2003: Comme un vol de vautours (Like a Flight of Vultures)
- 2004: Le pardon du grand Nord (The Forgiveness of the Far North)

== Filmography ==
[FD] : film director, [Sc] : screenwriter, [DW] : dialogue writer, [Wr] : writer of the original novel

- 1960 : Le Trou (The Hole), directed by Jacques Becker [Sc, Wr] starring Raymond Meunier, Michel Constantin
- 1960 : Classe tous risques (The Big Risk aka. Consider All Risks), [Sc, DW, Wr] directed by Claude Sautet starring Lino Ventura, Jean-Paul Belmondo
- 1961 : Un nommé La Rocca, directed by Jean Becker [Di, Wr : L'Excommunié] starring Jean-Paul Belmondo
- 1962 : Du rififi chez les femmes (The Riff Raff Girls), directed by Alex Joffé [Sc] starring Nadja Tiller, Robert Hossein
- 1963 : Symphony for a Massacre, directed by Jacques Deray [Sc, actor] starring Charles Vanel, Michel Auclair
- 1963 : Rififi in Tokyo, directed by Jacques Deray [DW] starring Charles Vanel, Karlheinz Böhm
- 1965 : That Man George, directed by Jacques Deray [Sc] starring George Hamilton, Claudine Auger
- 1965 : Les Grandes Gueules (The Wise Guys), directed by Robert Enrico [DW, Wr : Le Haut-Fer] starring Bourvil, Lino Ventura
- 1966 : To Skin a Spy, directed by Jacques Deray [Sc] starring Lino Ventura
- 1966 : Le Deuxième souffle (Second Breath), directed by Jean-Pierre Melville [Wr] starring Lino Ventura
- 1967 : Les Aventuriers (The Last Adventure), directed by Robert Enrico [Sc, DW, Wr] starring Lino Ventura, Alain Delon, Joanna Shimkus
- 1967 : La Loi du survivant [FD, Sc, DW, Wr : second part of Les Aventuriers] starring Michel Constantin, Roger Blin
- 1968 : Le Rapace [FD, Sc] starring Lino Ventura
- 1968 : Ho!, directed by Robert Enrico [Sc] starring Jean-Paul Belmondo, Joanna Shimkus
- 1969 : Le Clan des Siciliens (The Sicilian Clan), directed by Henri Verneuil [Sc] starring Alain Delon, Jean Gabin, Lino Ventura
- 1970 : Dernier domicile connu (Last Known Address) [FD, Sc] starring Lino Ventura, Marlène Jobert
- 1971 : Un aller simple [FD, Sc] starring Jean-Claude Bouillon, Nicoletta
- 1971 : Où est passé Tom? [FD, Sc] starring Rufus et Jean Gaven
- 1972 : La Scoumoune (The Hit Man) [FD, Sc, Wr : L'Excommunié] starring Jean-Paul Belmondo, Claudia Cardinale
- 1973 : Deux Hommes dans la ville (Two Men in Town aka. Two Against the Law) [FD, Sc] starring Jean Gabin, Alain Delon
- 1975 : Le Gitan [FD, Sc, Wr : Histoire de fou] starring Alain Delon, Annie Girardot
- 1976 : Comme un boomerang [FD, Sc] starring Alain Delon
- 1979 : Les Égouts du paradis (The Sewers of Paradise) [FD, Sc] starring Jean-François Balmer, Francis Huster, based on the criminal adventures of Albert Spaggiari
- 1980 : Une robe noire pour un tueur [FD, Sc] starring Annie Girardot, Claude Brasseur
- 1983 : Le Ruffian [FD, Sc, Wr : Les Ruffians] starring Lino Ventura, Bernard Giraudeau, Claudia Cardinale
- 1985 : Among Wolves [FD, Sc] starring Claude Brasseur, Niels Arestrup
- 1988 : Mon ami le traître [FD, Sc, Wr] starring André Dussollier, Jean-Pierre Bernard
- 1991: L'Irlandaise (TV film) [FD] starring Michel Sardou, Lorraine Pilkington, Thérèse Liotard
- 2000: Mon père, il m'a sauvé la vie [FD, Sc, Di, Wr : Il avait dans le cœur des jardins introuvables] starring Bruno Cremer, Vincent Lecœur
- 2007: Le deuxième souffle (Second Breath), remake directed by Alain Corneau [Wr] starring Daniel Auteuil, Michel Blanc, Jacques Dutronc
- 2014 : Two Men in Town American remake of Deux Hommes dans la ville, directed by Rachid Bouchareb [Sc] starring Forest Whitaker, Harvey Keitel, Ellen Burstyn, Luis Guzmán and Brenda Blethyn
