= Marie-Chantal contre le docteur Kha =

- Directed by: Claude Chabrol
- Screenplay by: Claude Chabrol; Christian Yve
- Based on: The characters created by Jacques Chazot
- Produced by: Georges de Beauregard
- Starring: Marie Laforêt; Francisco Rabal; Serge Reggiani; Charles Denner; Akim Tamiroff
- Cinematography: Jean Rabier
- Edited by: Jacques Gaillard; Monique Gaillard
- Music by: Pierre Jansen; Michel Colombier
- Production companies: Rome-Paris Films; Producciones DIA; Mega Films; Maghreb Unifilms
- Release date: August 25, 1965
- Running time: 106 minutes
- Countries: France; Spain; Italy; Morocco

Marie-Chantal contre le docteur Kha (lit. 'Marie-Chantal versus Dr. Kha') is a 1965 spy film directed by Claude Chabrol. The film stars Marie Laforêt as Marie-Chantal, a young woman who gets caught up with a group of spies led by Dr. Kha who seek out a jewel called the Blue Panther. The jewel was passed on to her by the secret agent Bruno Kerrien. Unbeknownst to Marie-Chantal, it contains a terrible virus capable of wiping out humanity.

Marie-Chantal contre le docteur Kha was one of the many European co-productions from the 1960s that made spy films following the worldwide success of the James Bond film series that decade. Chabrol, who was one of the directors in the French New Wave, had made a turn to more commercially-oriented projects in the 1960s with films like Marie-Chantal and Le Tigre aime la chair fraiche (1964), Our Agent Tiger (1965).

== Plot ==
While traveling to Switzerland with her cousin Hubert, the young woman Marie-Chantal meets Bruno Kerrien. Kerrien is a secret agent who entrusts her with the jewel called the Blue Panther. The jewel, is shaped like a panther's head with rubies for eyes. Amused by Kerrien, the young woman agrees to hold onto the jewel, unaware that it is coveted by a gang of international secret agents. She is pursued by several people such as the faux-American Johnson, the Russians Ivanov and Gregor, and Paco Castillo, who actually works for Dr. Kha's counterpart, Professor Lombardi.

On the orders of the diabolical Dr. Kha, who also seeks the Blue Panther, Kerrien is murdered. Before dying, he asks Marie-Chantal to take the object to a merchant in the Agadir bazaar. Before leaving for Morocco, she meets Olga, a mysterious young woman claiming to be Kerrien's widow. In reality, Olga is acting on behalf of Dr. Kha and manages to steal the jewel. They become prisoners of Dr. Kha, where Paco explains to Marie-Chantal the jewel actually contains a terrible virus capable of wiping out humanity. Fortunately, she confesses that she has kept the Panther's two eyes—which both contain the deadly virus—and turned them into earrings. They are then pursued by Kha and his followers and after a frantic chase, Marie-Chantal and Paco manage to escape. They board a plane in time to return to France, where Marie-Chantal will be reunited with her cousin.

== Cast ==
- Marie Laforêt as Marie-Chantal
- Francisco Rabal as Paco Castillo
- Serge Reggiani as Ivanov
- Charles Denner as Johnson
- Akim Tamiroff as Dr. Kha
- Roger Hanin as Bruno Kerrien
- Stéphane Audran as Olga
- Pierre-François Moro as Hubert (as Pierre Moro)
- Gilles Chusseau as Gregor
- Antonio Passalia as Sparafucile / Gunshooter (as Anthony Pass)
- Robert Burnier as Old Swissman
- Claude Chabrol as Barman / Drugstore clerk

== Production ==
=== Background and development ===
Dancer and humorist Jacques Chazot published Les Carnets de Marie-Chantal in Elle magazine in 1956. Les Carnets de Marie-Chantal was about the character Marie-Chantal, an archetype of a upper-class Parisian woman. Academic Marie-Anne Paveau said that the character of Maire-Chantel was a proto-type of a snob socialite. In the stories, Marie-Chantal goes through a series of adventures between Paris, Deauville, ski resorts, social gatherings and other parties. The Marie-Chantal stories became popular, and made Chazot famous.

Producer Georges de Beauregard purchased the rights to character from its creator with the idea of developing it into a film series in 1963. While initially thinking of Claude Berri, but Chazot opposed. It was then offered it to Claude Chabrol who agreed immediately to direct.

=== Pre-production and filming ===
In the 1960s, the James Bond films inspired hundreds of variations across continental Europe in the 1960s. Both The Eurospy Guide (2004) and The International Spy Film Guide (2016) listed numerous European co-productions made in Italy, Spain, France and West Germany and 19 from other countries that either parodied or blatantly plagiarized the Bond film series. Chabrol's film Marie-Chantal contre le docteur Kha in turn, was a French-Spanish-Italian-Moroccan co-production. Maghreb Uni-Films, was run out of Morocco by an associate of Hassan II of Morocco. In the 1960s, Chabrol went into more commercially minded filmmaking. This led to director Claude Chabrol directing a trio of spy films: Le Tigre aime la chair fraiche (1964), Our Agent Tiger (1965) and Marie-Chantal contre le docteur Kha. Budd Wilkins of Slant Magazine wrote that both this film and Chabrol's Landru (1963) found the director moving away from the naturalism of his earlier French New Wave films. Discussing these espionage films in a 1982 interview, Chabrol said he had "the good luck to be making these films right in the era of the spy film. If the porno film had been in vogue, that would have interested me much less." Beauregard had his friend, Christian Yve, a former director of Agence France-Presse wrote the script. The scriped was approved and reworked by Chabrol, who added the character of Doctor Lambare. The films title is a reference to Dr. No (1962), which was released as James Bond 007 contre Dr No in France.

Initially, Françoise Dorléac was considered for the role of Marie Chantal, who was too busy with several projects after the success of the film That Man From Rio (1964). Michèle Mercier was asked for the role of Marie-Chantal who declined. While Macha Méril was also considered for the role, it ultimately went to Marie Laforêt.

Filming began on February 23, 1965. Laforêt was pregnant at the time with her daughter Lisa Azuelos. She was able to conceal this from Chabrol until after the end of filming. To save money, all the scenes that were set in Switzerland were shot in Morocco in the High Atlas mountains. Filming completed on May 13.

== Release and reception ==
Marie-Chantal contre le docteur Kha was released on August 25, 1965. It was shown on American television in 1968 as The Blue Panther. Kino Lorber released the film on blu-ray under this title in 2021. This home video release was taken from a new 4K restoration of the original film negative by StudioCanal.

Gene Moskowitz, the longtime Paris correspondent and film critic for Variety found that "good color and fine pacing in the mock adventures have this one of the better pix of this kind to come out of France." Moskowitz also complimented Chabrol as being one of the first directors from the French New Wave to "show he can turn his acerbic wit to fine results in a commercial pic."

Robin Wood wrote in his book on Chabrol in 1970 that Marie-Chantal contre le docteur Kha "is no masterpiece but, at the lowest estimate, at least it's funny." In his book Claude Chabrol (1989), author Christian Blanchet suggested that Marie-Chantal contre le docteur Kha was the only spy film by Chabrol where he truly enjoys himself with the eccentric characters. In The Eurospy Guide, author Matt Blake praised the direction as well as the cinematography as "top-notch", the choreography as partly "hilarious" and found the music to be "good". He evaluates the sum of it all as "immensely entertaining".

Chabrol said that Marie-Chantal contre le docteur Kha was what "really what I wanted to do with that genre: the commentary on the commentary." and said it was the best of the three films and a parody of the spy film. Chabrol further expanded on the film in 2007, saying "I am well aware that when I made Marie-Chantal contre Docteur Kha it wasn't Schopenhauer. I let the spectator know that in that case it was a simple piece of entertainment. But at the same time I invited the spectator to ask himself why. And that has worked pretty well for me."
