= Ten Days' Wonder (film) =

- American poster of the film
- La Décade prodigieuse
- Directed by: Claude Chabrol
- Written by: Paul Gégauff; Eugène Archer; Paul Gardner; Ellery Queen (novel)
- Produced by: André Génovès
- Starring: Michel Piccoli; Anthony Perkins; Orson Welles; Marlène Jobert
- Cinematography: Jean Rabier
- Edited by: Jacques Gaillard
- Music by: Pierre Jansen
- Distributed by: Parafrance Films
- Release dates: December 1, 1971 (France); April 1972 (United States)
- Running time: 110 minutes
- Countries: France; Italy
- Language: English
- Box office: $5,323,830

Ten Days' Wonder (French: La Décade prodigieuse) is a 1971 French murder-mystery film directed by Claude Chabrol and starring Michel Piccoli, Anthony Perkins, Marlène Jobert and Orson Welles. It is based on the 1948 novel Ten Days' Wonder by Ellery Queen. As the story is transposed to France, the Ellery Queen character from the original novel is replaced as the investigator by a new character, Paul Régis. Welles and Perkins had worked together on several previous films, including The Trial (1962), directed by Welles, while Perkins had starred in Chabrol's The Champagne Murders (1967).

== Plot ==
Charles Van Horn, a tormented artist, wakes up in a Paris hotel room with blood on his hands and no memory of what happened. Fearing for his sanity, he calls his former university professor and trusted friend, Paul Régis, for help. Paul agrees to monitor Charles and accompanies him to his family mansion in the countryside, where he meets Charles' father, the wealthy tycoon and local benefactor Théo Van Horn.

A domineering patriarch, Théo is remarried to Hélène, a woman young enough to be his daughter. Paul discovers that Charles is having an affair with his stepmother. Charles has been receiving blackmail letters from someone aware of their affair, and steals money from his father to pay off the blackmailer's silence. During the next few days, bizarre events unfold at the Van Horns' mansion, as Charles' amnesia bouts and instability worsen and Paul tries to make sense of what transpires.

Charles eventually has a confrontation with his father; Hélène intervenes and is killed, apparently by Charles. Charles commits suicide. On the tenth day since his arrival, Paul returns to the mansion and confronts Théo with what he has deduced: Théo was the mastermind behind these events and has manipulated his son into killing himself, as revenge for his affair with Hélène. His crimes exposed, Théo shoots himself.

== Cast ==
- Anthony Perkins as Charles Van Horn
- Michel Piccoli as Paul Régis
- Marlène Jobert as Hélène Van Horn
- Orson Welles as Théo Van Horn
- Guido Alberti as Ludovic Van Horn
- Tsilla Chelton as Théo's mother

== Production ==
Claude Chabrol had long wished to adapt Ellery Queen's novel, the idea dating back before his first feature film Le Beau Serge. He initially considered shooting the film in India, where he had seen a house he thought would be an ideal setting for the story. For budgetary reasons, Chabrol had to abandon that idea; principal photography took place essentially in Alsace, near Obernai, while the opening scenes were shot in Paris.

While a predominantly French production, the film was shot entirely in English due to the presence in major roles of Anthony Perkins and Orson Welles. Chabrol had been told that Welles was impossible to work with, but eventually found him charming and very professional.

Chabrol had planned to cast Catherine Deneuve as the female lead, but filming had to be postponed after Orson Welles fell ill. Chabrol considered replacing Welles with Raymond Burr but ultimately preferred waiting for Welles to get better, by which time Deneuve had become unavailable and had to be replaced by Marlène Jobert. Chabrol later commented that this recasting had worked against the film because, even though Jobert was not at fault, unlike Deneuve she was not alluring enough to inspire a crime.

== Reception ==
The film performed decently at the French box office, selling about 700,000 admissions, a result somewhat below Chabrol's average. Critical reception in France was mixed. Chabrol later expressed dissatisfaction with the film. He notably regretted having allowed Welles to wear a prosthetic nose, which turned out to be too noticeable on screen. He was also unhappy about the dubbing, in the film's French version, of Welles and Perkins by Georges Aminel and Michel Duchaussoy, respectively.

Upon the film's American release, Vincent Canby of The New York Times found it to be a disappointment following Chabrol's recent string of good films; he called the plot predictable and the dialogue lackluster, and commented that "everybody in the cast looks uncomfortable, particularly Welles, who either has had a very bad make-up job or has let his nose turn gray."

Reviewing a revival of the film in 2018, Richard Brody wrote in The New Yorker "… it’s a minor masterwork of freakazoidal cinema.… Chabrol orchestrates the grandiose theatrical tension with giddily audacious cinematography…. He reveals ravenous depravity beneath pious displays of benevolence and warns of the dangerous marriage of money and art."

== Home video ==
Ten Days' Wonder was reissued in Region 1 and Region 2 DVD editions. and streamed on Amazon Prime in its English-language version.
