= Pleasure Party =

Une partie de plaisir
- Theatrical release poster
- Directed by: Claude Chabrol
- Written by: Paul Gégauff
- Produced by: André Génovès
- Starring: Danièle Gégauff; Paul Gégauff; Clemence Gégauff
- Cinematography: Jean Rabier
- Edited by: Jacques Gaillard
- Music by: Pierre Jansen
- Production companies: Gerico Sound; Les Films La Boëtie; Sunchild Productions
- Distributed by: Les Films La Boëtie
- Release dates: January 15, 1975 (France); May 20, 1976 (United States)
- Running time: 97 minutes
- Country: France
- Language: French

Pleasure Party (French: Une partie de plaisir; released in North America as A Piece of Pleasure) is a 1975 French film directed by Claude Chabrol and starring its screenwriter and longtime Chabrol collaborator Paul Gégauff. In the film, Gégauff plays a writer with a troubled marriage that ends in tragedy. His wife is played by his real-life first wife Danièle Gégauff (already divorced when this film was made) and his daughter is played by real-life daughter Clemence Gégauff.

== Plot ==
Philippe and Esther are happily married and living a middle class life with their young daughter. In order to add excitement and sophistication to the marriage, Philippe suggests they begin sleeping with other people then describing it to each other. But Philippe becomes filled with jealousy and anger towards his wife until tragedy destroys the entire family.

== Cast ==
- Danièle Gégauff as Esther
- Paul Gégauff as Philippe
- Clemence Gégauff as Elise
- Paula Moore as Sylvia Murdoch
- Cécile Vassort as Annie
- Giancarlo Sisti as Habib
- Mario Santini as Rosco
- Michel Valette as Katkof
- Pierre Santini as Michel

== Reception ==
Film critic Roger Ebert gave the film two-and-a-half stars out of four. He wrote, "A Piece Of Pleasure doesn't provide the pleasures of so many Chabrol films, maybe because in getting these experiences out of their systems the filmmakers weren't tremendously concerned in getting them into ours. A Chabrol masterpiece like Le Boucher is made with Chabrol's attention totally absorbed in how he's affecting us; this time, working with people he has known for a long time and telling their most intimate secrets, he sometimes seems to be simply watching along with the rest of us."

John Simon described Une Partie de plasir's story as "partly trivial, and partly unbelievable". Simon went on to say the film's characters are "too bad, too good, or too stupid to be true, and neither plot nor dialogue comes to the rescue".

Vincent Canby of The New York Times was more positive, writing "The film is much more interesting and more haunting, though, as a meditation on love, on the complex system of balances that work in any love relationship, and on the furies that can be let loose within such relationships when the balances are disturbed." He added, "Not since Les Biches has Mr. Chabrol so wittily (and mercilessly) examined the wars that are fought in life's living rooms and bedrooms, in kitchens and over dining room tables with friends as neutral, sometimes amused, sometimes appalled observers."
