= The Road to Corinth =

La route de Corinthe
- Directed by: Claude Chabrol
- Written by: Daniel Boulanger; Claude Brulé; Claude Rank (novel)
- Produced by: André Génovès
- Starring: Jean Seberg; Maurice Ronet; Christian Marquand
- Cinematography: Jean Rabier
- Edited by: Jacques Gaillard
- Music by: Pierre Jansen
- Production companies: Les Films La Boëtie, Paris; Orion-Films, Paris; Compagnia Generale Finanzaria Cinematografica, Rome
- Release date: 27 October 1967 (France)
- Running time: 102 minutes (2792 metres)
- Countries: France; Italy; Greece
- Language: French

The Road to Corinth (French: La route de Corinthe, Italian: Criminal story, also released as Who's Got the Black Box?) is a 1967 French-Italian Eurospy film directed by Claude Chabrol. It was based on the 1966 novel by Claude Rank, pseudonym of Gaston-Claude Petitjean-Darville (1925-2004).

== Plot ==
During the Cold War in Greece, NATO radar and missile systems experience mysterious problems caused by small breakdowns electronic black boxes. Robert Ford is murdered as he is on the verge of elucidating the problem.

His wife, Shanny, takes over the investigation despite the opposition of the head of the secret service, Mr. Sharps. The latter orders the intelligence agent Dex, a friend of Robert and Shanny, to monitor Shanny's whereabouts. Out of love for her, Dex finally agrees to help Shanny in her mission.

Dex and Shanny unmask the culprit Khalidès by discovering the black boxes, which he has hidden in the statue replicas which he produces and sells. However, a police raid comes up empty-handed. Through his henchmen, Khalidès has Shanny kidnapped and brought on a mule to an ancient temple on top of a mountain. When he ties her to a cart and is about to throw her off the cliff, she accepts his marriage proposal. Just as he has finished untying her, he is shot by the approaching Dex and falls off the cliff himself. Dex leaves his job behind and joins Shanny on her flight home.

== Cast ==
- Jean Seberg as Shanny
- Maurice Ronet as Dex
- Christian Marquand as Robert Ford
- Michel Bouquet as Sharps
- Saro Urzì as Khalidès
- Antonio Passalia as the killer
- Paolo Giusti as Josio
- Max Roman
- Artemis Matsas
- Zannino
- Stève Eckhardt
- Vassili Diamantopoulos
- Claude Chabrol as Alkibiades, traitor

== Production ==
La route de Corinthe was shot in Greece during 7 weeks in May and June 1967.

== Release ==
The film premiered on 27 October 1967 in Paris, and on April 5 1968 in Germany. It was released in the U.S. on April 17, 1970 in a cut and dubbed version retitled Who's Got the Black Box?.

== Reception ==
TV Guide called it "a spoofy spy-lark" and said "Chabrol delights in turning cliches inside out" while "demonstrating how much fun can be had from subverting the wildly improbable plot twists and unlikely events which are typical of spy capers."
