= Christa Lang =

German actress (1943–2026)

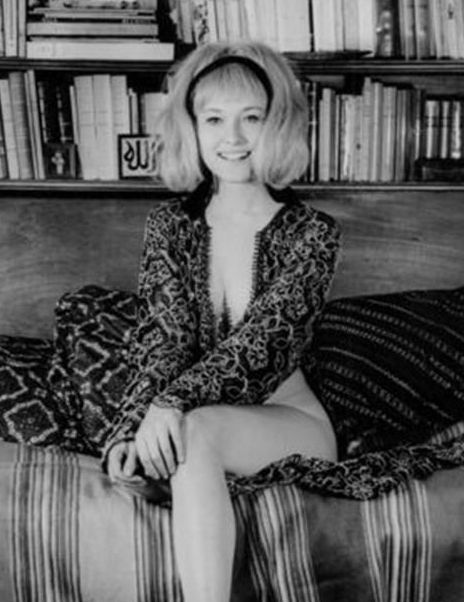
- Lang in a publicity photo, ca. 1967
- Born: Christa Lang; 23 December 1943; Winterberg, Gau Westphalia-South, Germany
- Died: 30 January 2026 (aged 82); Los Angeles, California, U.S.
- Occupations: Actress, screenwriter
- Spouse: Samuel Fuller (m. 1967; died 1997)
- Children: Samantha Fuller

Christa Lang-Fuller (23 December 1943 – 30 January 2026) was a German-American film and television actress and screenwriter. Lang worked frequently with her husband, director Samuel Fuller, and is known for such films as White Dog, Dead Pigeon on Beethoven Street, What's Up, Doc?, Land of Plenty, No Fear, No Die, Alphaville, The Big Red One, Nickelodeon and Thieves After Dark.

== Early life ==
Christa Lang was born in Winterberg on 23 December 1943. At age 17, Lang moved to France, working in Paris as an au pair and a translator for a textile firm while studying acting.

== Career ==
Lang made her film debut in the French new wave film The Murderer Knows the Score (1963), and had an uncredited walk-on role in Alphaville (1965). In 1967, she had a supporting part in The Champagne Murders opposite Anthony Perkins, followed by a supporting role in What's Up, Doc? (1972) opposite Barbra Streisand. In 1976, she appeared as Anna Hauptmann in The Lindbergh Kidnapping Case, based on the Lindbergh kidnapping.

She would go on to appear in her husband, Samuel Fuller's film White Dog (1982). In 1981, Lang co-founded Chrisam Films with Fuller. She also appeared in the French film Thieves After Dark (1984), and The Blood of Others (1984), opposite Jodie Foster and Sam Neill.

As a screenwriter, Lang is perhaps best known as the co-writer, with her husband, of the 1994 film Girls in Prison.

== Personal life and death ==
Lang was married to director Samuel Fuller from 1967 until his death in 1997. They had one daughter. She died at her home in Los Angeles, on 30 January 2026, at the age of 82.

== Filmography as actress ==
Year	Title	Role	Notes
1963	The Murderer Knows the Score	Christine	
1964	Code Name: Tiger	La fille avec Dobrovsky	
1965	Alphaville	1st Seductress Third Class	uncredited
1965	Mission spéciale à Caracas	Christelle	
1966	The Upper Hand	La fille de Mario	
1967	The Champagne Murders	Paula	
1967	Réseau secret	Eva	
1969	Charro!	Christa	
1972	What's Up, Doc?	Mrs. Hosquith	
1973	Dead Pigeon on Beethoven Street	Christa	originally a Tatort episode
1975	At Long Last Love	Pregnant Lady	
1976	The Lindbergh Kidnapping Case	Anna Hauptmann	television film
1976	Nickelodeon	Stage Performer	
1980	The Big Red One	German Countess	uncredited
1982	White Dog	Nurse	
1984	Thieves After Dark	Solange	
1984	The Blood of Others	Femme Allemand fouille	
1984	Mistral's Daughter	Concierge	miniseries; 4 episodes
1989	Samuel Fuller's Street of No Return	Nurse	
1990	Tinikling ou 'La madonne et le dragon'	Mama	
1990	No Fear, No Die	Toni's mother	
1993	Les arpenteurs de Montmartre		
1998	L. A. Without a Map	Woman on Bus	
2001	Aizea: City of the Wind	Card Playing Woman	short film
2004	Land of Plenty	Trailer Park Woman	
2013	Night of the Templar	Blind Woman	
2017	The Queen of Hollywood Blvd	Mama	
