= Roger Hanin =

French actor (1925–2015)

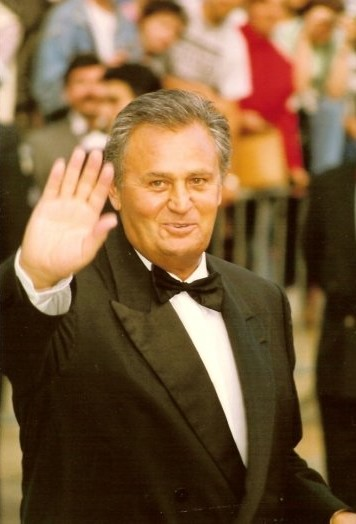
- Roger Hanin at the 1992 Cannes Film Festival
- Born: Roger Paul Jacob Lévy; 20 October 1925; Algiers, Algeria
- Died: 11 February 2015 (aged 89); Paris, France
- Occupations: Actor, director
- Spouse: Christine Gouze-Rénal

Roger Hanin (born Roger Levy, 20 October 1925 – 11 February 2015) was a French actor and film director, best known for playing the title role in the TV police drama, Navarro.

== Career ==
Roger Hanin was born in 1925 in Algiers, Algeria as Roger Lévy to Jewish parents. His brother-in-law was François Mitterrand (the former President of France), whose wife, Danielle, was the sister of Hanin's wife, Christine Gouze-Rénal.

With Claude Chabrol, Hanin co-wrote the scripts for a pair of spy films in the mid-1960s. Chabrol directed Code Name: Tiger (1964) and Our Agent Tiger (1965), both featuring Hanin in the starring role of secret agent Le Tigre.

From the late 1970s, Hanin enjoyed newfound popularity in France thanks to his roles in Le Coup de Sirocco (1979), a dramedy about the pieds-noirs exodus in Metropolitan France and Le Grand Pardon (1982), a gangster film about the French Jewish pied-noir mafia. Both films were directed by Alexandre Arcady. From 1989 to 2007, he played the title character in the TV series Navarro.

== Awards and honours ==
His 1985 film, Hell Train, was entered into the 14th Moscow International Film Festival where it won a Special Prize.

In September 2000 he was awarded a place on the honourable list of the National Order of Merit of Algeria. He said: "I always refused decorations. This is the first time that I agree, but it's also the last because I want it to be unique."

== Filmography ==
=== Actor ===
Year	Title	Role	Director	Notes
1952	The Road to Damascus	Un disciple	Max Glass	
1953	La môme vert-de-gris	a bodyguard	Bernard Borderie	
1954	Les Impures	Le client de Lili	Pierre Chevalier	Uncredited
1955	Série noire	Ménard	Pierre Foucaud	
1955	Gas-Oil	René Schwob	Gilles Grangier	
1955	Les Hussards	a soldier	Alex Joffé	Uncredited
1955	Les salauds vont en enfer	Un mauvais garçon	Robert Hossein	Uncredited
1955	Vous pigez ?	Istria	Pierre Chevalier	
1957	He Who Must Die	Pannagotaros	Jules Dassin	
1957	Escapade	Olivier	Ralph Habib	
1958	Tamango	First Mate Bebe	John Berry	
1958	The Cat	Pierre	Henri Decoin	
1958	Be Beautiful But Shut Up	Charlemagne	Marc Allégret	
1958	Le désordre et la nuit	Albert Simoni	Gilles Grangier	
1958	Sunday Encounter	Robert Sartori	Marc Allégret	
1959	Ramuntcho	Itchoa	Pierre Schoendoerffer	
1959	La Valse du Gorille	Géo Paquet a.k.a. le Gorille	Bernard Borderie	
1959	Du rififi chez les femmes	Bug	Alex Joffé	
1959	Le Fric	Robert Bertin	Maurice Cloche	
1959	The Verdict	Antoine Castellani	Jean Valère	
1960	Breathless	Cal Zombach	Jean-Luc Godard	
1960	L'Ennemi dans l'ombre	Serge Cazais	Charles Gérard	
1960	Rocco and His Brothers	Morini	Luchino Visconti	
1960	L'Affaire d'une nuit	Michel Ferréol	Henri Verneuil	
1961	Vive Henri IV, vive l'amour	Ravaillac	Claude Autant-Lara	
1961	Le Miracle des loups	Charles the Bold	André Hunebelle	
1961	Les Bras de la nuit	Inspecteur Landais	Jacques Guymont	
1962	Les Ennemis	Capitaine Jean de Lursac	Édouard Molinaro	
1962	Carillons sans joie	Maurice	Charles Brabant	
1962	Le Gorille a mordu l'archevêque	Géo Paquet a.k.a. le Gorille	Maurice Labro	
1962	March on Rome	Capitaine Paolinelli	Dino Risi	
1963	Portuguese Vacation		Pierre Kast	Uncredited
1964	Das Haus auf dem Hügel	Ernest Charnot	Werner Klingler	
1964	Le Tigre aime la chair fraiche	Louis Rapière a.k.a. le Tigre	Claude Chabrol	
1965	Passeport diplomatique agent K 8	Mirmont	Robert Vernay	
1965	Un mari à prix fixe	Romain de Brétigny	Claude de Givray	
1965	Code Name: Jaguar	Bob Stuart	Maurice Labro	
1965	Marie-Chantal contre le docteur Kha	Bruno Kerrien	Claude Chabrol	
1965	Our Agent Tiger	Louis Rapière a.k.a. le Tigre	Claude Chabrol	
1966	Via Macau	Michel	Jean Leduc	
1966	Our Men in Bagdad	Sadov	Paolo Bianchini	
1966	The Brides of Fu Manchu	Pierre Grimaldi	Don Sharp	
1966	Four Queens for an Ace	Dan Layton	Jacques Poitrenaud	
1966	Le Solitaire passe à l'attaque	Frank Norman	Ralph Habib	
1967	Da Berlino l'Apocalisse	Saint Dominique	Mario Maffei	
1967	Le chacal traque les filles	François Merlin, dit le Chacal	Jean-Michel Rankovitch	
1967	Le Canard en fer blanc	François Cartier	Jacques Poitrenaud	
1968	They Came to Rob Las Vegas	the Boss	Antonio Isasi-Isasmendi	
1969	Bruno, l'enfant du dimanche	Michel Fauvel	Louis Grospierre	
1969	La Main	L'inspecteur / Le producteur	Henri Glaeser	
1969	Plus jamais seuls	Stéphane	Jean Delire	
1970	Le clair de terre	M. Brumeu, le père de Pierre	Guy Gilles	
1970	Senza via d'uscita	Kurt	Michael Pressman	
1971	Une femme libre	André	Claude Pierson	
1971	The Most Gentle Confessions	Inspecteur Borelli	Édouard Molinaro	
1972	The Revengers	Quiberon	Daniel Mann	
1973	La raison du plus fou	Le patron de l'hôtel	François Reichenbach	
1973	Le concierge	Barbarin - un industriel	Jean Girault	
1973	Tony Arzenta	Carré	Duccio Tessari	
1974	Le Protecteur	Julien da Costa	Himself	
1975	L'intrépide	Canello	Jean Girault	
1975	Le faux-cul	Belkacem	Himself	
1978	The Pocket Lover	Barbouze ministre 1	Bernard Queysanne	
1978	Le Sucre	Karbaoui	Jacques Rouffio	
1979	Le Coup de sirocco	Albert Narboni	Alexandre Arcady	
1980	Certaines nouvelles	Georges	Jacques Davila	
1982	Le Grand Pardon	Raymond Bettoun	Alexandre Arcady	
1982	Les Misérables	the innkeeper	Robert Hossein	
1982	La Baraka	Aimé Prado	Jean Valère	
1983	My Other Husband	Philippe	Georges Lautner	
1983	Le Grand Carnaval	Léon Castelli	Alexandre Arcady	
1985	Hell Train	Commissaire Couturier	Himself	
1986	La Galette du roi	Victor Harris	Jean-Michel Ribes	
1986	L'étincelle	Maurice	Michel Lang	
1987	Lévy et Goliath	God	Gérard Oury	Voice only, uncredited
1987	La rumba	Beppo Manzoni	Himself	
1987	Dernier été à Tanger	William Barrès, le maître de Tanger	Alexandre Arcady	
1989	L'Orchestre rouge	Berzine	Jacques Rouffio	
1990	Jean Galmot, aventurier	Georges Picard, le gouverneur	Alain Maline	
1992	Day of Atonement	Raymond Bettoun	Alexandre Arcady	
1993	Le Nombril du monde	Scali	Ariel Zeitoun	
1997	Soleil	Prof. Meyer Lévy	Himself	

=== Producer ===
- Soleil (1997) with Marianne Sägebrecht
