= Pierre Jansen =

French film score composer

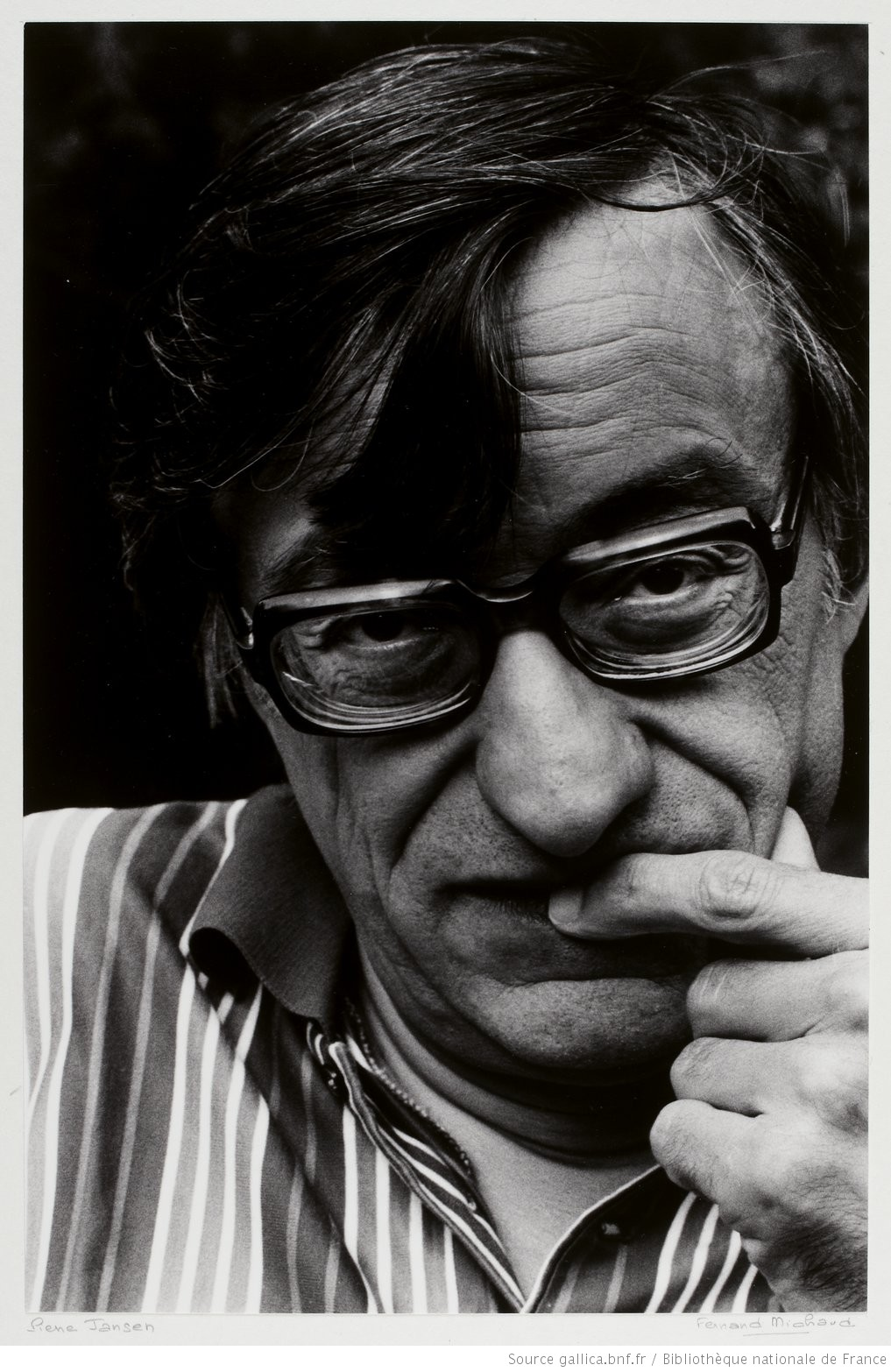
Portrait by Fernand Michaud. Festival d'Avignon 1986

Pierre Georges Cornil Jansen (28 February 1930 – 13 August 2015 at Saint-Pierre-Saint-Jean) was a French film scores composer. He was in particular the permanent collaborator of Claude Chabrol for whom he composed the music for many films.

== Life ==
Born in Roubaix, Jansen did his first musical studies at the Conservatoire de Roubaix (piano and harmony) under the direction of Alfred Desenclos. He furthered his studies at the Royal Conservatory of Brussels (piano and harmony prizes) and writing studies with André Souris (harmony, counterpoint, fugue and orchestration).

From 1952 onwards, he regularly attended classes with Olivier Messiaen and participated in the Ferienkurse für die neue Musik in Darmstadt. In 1958, a suite for piano and 18 instruments was premiered in Darmstadt, and later performed in Paris during a concert of the Domaine musical.

In 1960, he renounced the achievements of the avant-garde and devoted himself to film music. He collaborated with Claude Chabrol of whom he became the official composer. About Pierre Jansen, the director of the French New Wave said: "I met a brother in music." while the latter described his meeting with Chabrol as "decisive and unexpected.". He then worked with Claude Goretta, Francis Girod and Pierre Schoendoerffer. He also collaborated for television by composing music for Serge Moati and Josée Dayan.

In 1985, he composed for silent cinema, in collaboration with Antoine Duhamel, an extensive score for large orchestra to accompany the images of David Wark Griffith's famous Intolerance. This work was premiered by the Orchestre national d'Île-de-France (Jacques Mercier conducting) and screened live at the Théâtre des Amandiers, then at the Festival d'Avignon.

A version of this film, newly restored, was made in 2007. It required a new adaptation of the score. Rerecorded under the direction of Jean Deroyer, it was broadcast on Arte. This version is available on DVD.

Gradually abandoning film music because he did not want to fall into commercial ease, he then devoted himself to his own work by composing concerts pieces.

He taught orchestration at the École normale de musique de Paris, as well as at the Conservatoire de Paris (CNSMDP).

== Catalogues of works ==
- For orchestra:
  - 1 symphony (1995)
  - Concerto for viola and chamber orchestra (1988)
  - Éloge de la consonance (1989)
  - Litanie pour un Eden (1993)
  - Concerto for piano and orchestra (2006)
  - L’an deux mille, la fin d’un millénaire for choir and orchestra (1999)
  - Duo suite for piano and orchestra (orchestration of the Suite for two pianos) (1987)
  - Concerto for Saxhorn and Orchestra (2014)
- For piano:
  - First sonata (1983)
  - Second sonata (1986 – 1989)
  - Twelve pieces for piano
  - Four-handed recreation
  - Suite for two pianos (1983)
- For guitar:
  - Concerto for guitar and strings (Bèrben 2006)
  - Evocation d'un Concerto (2006, unpublished)
- Chamber music:
  - First String Quartet (1980)
  - Second string quartet (1991)
  - Trio for piano, violin and cello (2000)
  - Sonatina for violin and piano (1977)
  - Fantaisie toccata et rondes, cello and piano (1981)
  - 3 Caractères (3 Characters) for viola and piano (2003)
  - Duo for violin and viola (2006)
  - Vagabondages for flute (C and G) and piano (2007)
  - Some chained fragments for bass clarinet and harp
  - Sonata for violin and piano (2011)
- Various ensembles:
  - Sphène for harp quintet (1971)
  - Les arborescences for brass quintet
  - Quintet concert for clarinet, violin, cello and piano (1993)
  - Rétro-voyage for alto saxophone, harp, violin, cello, celesta and piano
  - Burlesque for flute, bass clarinet, piston, trombone, percussion, piano, violin and double bass
- Vocal music:
  - Six poems from epigrams by Paul Verlaine for baritone and piano
  - Quatre-Temps for contralto, narrator and piano (there is a version with orchestra).

== Filmography ==
=== Cinema ===
- 1960: Les Bonnes Femmes (Claude Chabrol)
- 1961: La Ligne droite (Jacques Gaillard)
- 1961: Wise Guys (Claude Chabrol)
- 1962: The Seven Deadly Sins (sketch)
- 1962: The Third Lover (Claude Chabrol)
- 1963: Ophelia (Claude Chabrol)
- 1963: Landru (Claude Chabrol)
- 1963: The 317th Platoon (Pierre Schoendoerffer)
- 1964: L'Homme qui vendit la tour Eiffel (sketch in Les plus belles escroqueries du monde) (Claude Chabrol)
- 1964: Le Tigre aime la chair fraîche (Claude Chabrol)
- 1965: Une si jeune paix (Jacques Charby)
- 1965: Marie-Chantal contre le docteur Kha (Claude Chabrol)
- 1965: Our Agent Tiger (Claude Chabrol)
- 1966: Line of Demarcation (Claude Chabrol)
- 1967: The Champagne Murders (Claude Chabrol)
- 1967: The Road to Corinthe (Claude Chabrol)
- 1968: Les Biches (Claude Chabrol)
- 1968: Adriatic Sea of Fire (Alexandre Astruc)
- 1969: The Unfaithful Wife (Claude Chabrol)
- 1969: This Man Must Die (Claude Chabrol)
- 1969: La Main (Henri Glaeser)
- 1970: Le Boucher (Claude Chabrol)
- 1970: The Breach (Claude Chabrol)
- 1971: Just Before Nightfall (Claude Chabrol)
- 1971: The Savior (1971) (Michel Mardore)
- 1971: Ten Days' Wonder (Claude Chabrol)
- 1972: Dr. Popaul (Claude Chabrol)
- 1973: Wedding in Blood (Claude Chabrol)
- 1974: Nada (Claude Chabrol)
- 1975: Une partie de plaisir (Claude Chabrol)
- 1975: Les Innocents aux mains sales (Claude Chabrol)
- 1976: Nuit d'or (Serge Moati)
- 1977: Alice ou la Dernière Fugue (Claude Chabrol)
- 1977: The Lacemaker (Claude Goretta)
- 1978: Les Liens de sang (Claude Chabrol)
- 1978: Violette Nozière (Claude Chabrol)
- 1978: The Savage State (Francis Girod)
- 1980: L'Œil du maître (Stéphane Kurc)
- 1980: The Horse of Pride (Claude Chabrol)
- 1982: Le Grand Frère (Francis Girod)
- 1984: Rebelote (Jacques Richard)
- 1985: Monsieur de Pourceaugnac (Michel Mitrani)
- 1989: La Folle Journée ou le mariage de Figaro (Roger Coggio)
- 1991: Boulevard des hirondelles (Josée Yanne)

=== Television ===
- 1974: Le Pain noir (Serge Moati) (TV serials)
- 1978: Ciné-roman (Serge Moati)
- 1980: Mont-Oriol after Guy de Maupassant (Serge Moati)

== Discography ==
- L’Œuvre pour piano - Erika Haase, piano (1997, 2CDs Triton TRI 331106) — with works by Colette Zerah-Jansen, interprétées par elle-même. First world recording.

== Bibliography ==
- Pierre Jansen: Musikanalyse von Joel Flegler, in: Fanfare: Band 18, Ausgabe 6, Musikmagazin 1995, page 213
- Pierre Jansen: Portrait und Filmmusikanalyse by Royal S. Brown, in: Overtones and Undertones: Reading Film Music, University of California Press 1994, pages 222–225, ISBN 0-520-08544-2
- Pierre Jansen: Profil und Interview by François Porcile and Alain Garel, in: CinémAction – La musique à l’écran, N° 62 January 1992, CinémAction-Corlet, Télérama, pages 55–58, ISBN 2-85480-376-0
- Pierre Jansen: Filmographie von Steven C. Smith in: Film Composers Guide – First Edition, Lone Eagle Publishing, Beverly Hills, Kalifornien 1990, pages 78–79, ISBN 0-943728-36-3
