= Dr. Popaul =

- Theatrical release poster
- Directed by: Claude Chabrol
- Written by: Paul Gégauff
- Based on: Murder at Leisure by Hubert Monteilhet
- Produced by: André Génovès; Georges Casati; Jean Paul Belmondo (uncredited)
- Starring: Jean-Paul Belmondo; Mia Farrow; Laura Antonelli
- Cinematography: Jean Rabier
- Edited by: Jacques Gaillard
- Music by: Pierre Jansen
- Production companies: Certio Films; Les Films La Boëtie; Rizzoli Film
- Distributed by: Les Films La Boëtie; Cinema International Corporation
- Release date: 1972
- Running time: 115 minutes
- Countries: France; Italy
- Language: French
- Box office: 2,062,042 admissions (France)

Dr. Popaul is a 1972 French black comedy film directed by Claude Chabrol. also known under the titles High Heels and Scoundrel in White. Based on the 1969 novel Murder at Leisure by Hubert Monteilhet, the film tells the story of an inveterate womaniser who, after marrying an unattractive but rich girl, seduces her prettier sister and has a baby with her. The revenge of his wife is painful and fatal.

== Plot ==
As a medical student, Paul became celebrated for the conquest of unattractive girls, finding them more satisfying than prettier ones. On holiday in Tunisia he met Christine, a shy young woman with a crippled leg, and took her virginity. Back in France he met her father, owner of a lucrative private clinic, who offered to make him co-director of the clinic if he married Christine.

At the wedding he met her beautiful younger sister, Martine, and applied himself to removing all her suitors one by one. He then took to drugging Christine so that he could spend the nights with Martine, who had his baby. He thought he had a happy family of wife, mistress, and child until a mysterious road accident left him crippled for life and emasculated.

Martine left him, and Christine brought him a drug so that he could end it all. After he took the drug, over the intercom Christine explained that while he was cavorting with Martine she was comforted by the co-director Berthier. Together they staged the accident, after which Berthier operated to remove Paul's mobility and virility. Paul screamed for help, but the room was soundproofed.

== Cast ==
- Jean-Paul Belmondo as Docteur Paul Simay
- Mia Farrow as Christine Dupont
- Laura Antonelli as Martine Dupont
- Marlène Appelt as Carole, the nurse
- Dominique Zardi as the Bishop
- Daniel Lecourtois as Professeur Dupont
- Daniel Ivernel as Docteur Berthier
- Patrick Préjean as Arthur Rignard
- Michel Peyrelon as Joseph
- Henri Attal as Old Woman

== Production ==
The film was the first movie from Belmondo's own production company, Cerito Films.

== Reception ==
At the time of its release, it was the biggest hit of Chabrol's career. It grossed $2 million in its first month of release in France. However it was not released in Britain until 1976, where it was titled Scoundrel in White. It was not released in the US until 1981, where it had the title High Heels.

The film received mixed reviews upon release. The New York Times said "the performances are uniformly good" but "more interesting than the movie itself is the way its concerns with guilt and roletrading relate to other, far better Chabrol films." Time Out called it a "coarse farce" that "looked more like the director's revenge on the French mass audience, who had consistently ignored his good movies, but would accept anything with Belmondo." "It stinks" said the Los Angeles Times.
