= Blood Relatives (1978 film) =

1978 film by Claude Chabrol

- French film poster
- Directed by: Claude Chabrol
- Screenplay by: Sydney Banks; Claude Chabrol
- Based on: Blood Relatives by Ed McBain
- Produced by: Denis Héroux; Eugène Lépicier
- Starring: Donald Sutherland; Aude Landry; Stéphane Audran; Micheline Lanctôt; Lisa Langlois; Laurent Malet
- Cinematography: Jean Rabier
- Edited by: Yves Langlois
- Production companies: Filmel; Cinévidéo; Classic Film; The Rank Organisation
- Distributed by: Rank Film Distributors (UK)
- Release dates: February 1, 1978 (France); April 21, 1978 (United Kingdom); August 31, 1978 (Canada)
- Running time: 100 minutes
- Countries: France; Canada; United Kingdom
- Budget: $1,354,000

Blood Relatives (French: Les Liens de sang) is a 1978 film directed by Claude Chabrol, adapted by Chabrol and Sydney Banks from the 1975 "87th Precinct" novel by Ed McBain. It stars Donald Sutherland as McBain's fictional police detective Steve Carella, who investigates the brutal murder of a teenaged girl.

The cast also features Aude Landry, Stéphane Audran, Lisa Langlois, Micheline Lanctôt, Laurent Malet, Donald Pleasence and David Hemmings. The film was a co-production between French and Canadian companies, with shooting taking place in Montreal.

== Plot ==
One rainy night in Montreal, a teenage girl named Patricia Lowery staggers, wounded, into a police station, saying that she and her older cousin Muriel, who lived in her family home, had been brutally attacked with a knife in a dark alley. The police find the mutilated body of the attractive Muriel. Patricia describes the assailant to them, but in an identity parade picks out a policeman.

Led by Inspector Steve Carella, the investigation tries to find out who might have wanted to kill an apparently normal girl from an apparently normal family. A possible clue comes at the funeral, when Patricia's brother Andrew, in grief, throws himself on the coffin of his dead cousin. Patricia then tells Carella that it was Andrew who had murdered Muriel, his motive being that she had been sleeping with him but left him for her married boss, and had tried to kill Patricia as the only witness. The proof, she says, was in Muriel's diary.

When found by the police, the diary confirms Patricia's second story, insofar as Muriel did switch her affections from Andrew to her boss, but it also records a violent encounter between an evasive Muriel and an angry Andrew which formed the basis of Patricia's first story. After repeated lying, the girl admits that she was lethally jealous of the sexier Muriel, who she felt had stolen the love of her brother. After killing her horribly, she wounded herself to give credibility to her story.

== Cast ==
- Donald Sutherland as Inspector Steve Carella
- Aude Landry as Patricia Lowery
- Lisa Langlois as Muriel Stark
- Laurent Malet as Andrew Lowery
- Stéphane Audran as Mrs. Lowery
- Walter Massey as Mr. Lowery
- Micheline Lanctôt as Mrs. Carella
- Donald Pleasence as James Doniac
- David Hemmings as Mr. Armstrong
- Kenny Ireland as Bert Klinger

Cast adapted from French Thrillers of the 1970s: Volume I, Crime Films (2024).

== Production ==
Blood Relatives was the second film director Claude Chabrol made with producer Eugène Lépicier after Alice or the Last Escapade (1977). The film came to be after Chabrol gave up making a film that was intended to be a comedy about the Second International titled Cannes Saint-Petersbourg. Along with Lépicier, the film was made with the Canadian producer Denis Héroux. The film's budget was split 50/50 between France and Canada, with the Paris-based Filmel, and the two Montreal-based film companies Cinévidéo and Classic Film. Chabrol's film is based on the Ed McBain's novel Blood Relatives (1975), the 30th novel in McBain's 87th Precinct series. Chabrol initially wanted to re-locate the film to France, and turn the character of Steve Carella by casting Philippe Noiret and "making it like Quai des Orfèvres." Making the film in Canada had the film changed its setting to being shot in Montreal, and allowing him to take advantage of a tax deferment for foreign-shot films. Filming took place between July and September 2 in 1977 with a budget of about $1,354,000.

The English-language version features a different score, with the original being done by Chabrol's recurring collaborator composer, Pierre Jansen. The English-language version of the film has a different score by Howard Blake. Blake said Peter Collinson purchased the rights to the film in the United Kingdom and the United States and approached him in March 1978 to write a few cues for the film. Blake obliged and proceeded to write a new score in a few weeks in April 1978.

== Release and reception ==
Blood Relatives was released in France on February 1, 1978. The authors of French Thrillers of the 1970s: Volume I, Crime Films (2026) said the film did "disappointing business in France" with only 262,000 spectators. It was shown at the World Film Festival in Canada on August 31, 1978. It was released in the United Kingdom on April 21, 1978, and in the United States on October 28, 1981.

A review in Variety said the sudden revelation of the character's madness "makes the pic somewhat ambivalent".

== Legacy ==
Filmmaker Akira Kurosawa, who adopted a McBain novel with his film High and Low (1963), called Chabrol a "pretty skillful director" and that Blood Relatives was "the best of all Ed McBain adaptations". Ed McBain spoke about the film in a 2003 interview, saying that while Chabrol was "a very good filmmaker", he found the film "boring. I think it's because it was too faithful to the book. It was not a transposition."
