= Masks (1987 film) =

1987 film

- Film poster
- Directed by: Claude Chabrol
- Written by: Odile Barski; Claude Chabrol
- Produced by: Marin Karmitz
- Starring: Philippe Noiret; Robin Renucci
- Cinematography: Jean Rabier
- Edited by: Monique Fardoulis
- Release date: 11 February 1987
- Running time: 100 minutes
- Country: France
- Language: French

Masks (French: Masques) is a 1987 French mystery thriller film directed by Claude Chabrol. It was entered into the 37th Berlin International Film Festival.

== Plot ==
Talent show host Christian Legagneur hires a young reporter, Roland Wolf, to write his biography. However, Wolf has ulterior motives - he is also investigating his sister's disappearance.

== Cast ==
- Philippe Noiret as Christian Legagneur
- Robin Renucci as Roland Wolf
- Bernadette Lafont as Patricia, La masseuse / The masseuse
- Monique Chaumette as Colette, la secrétaire / The secretary
- Anne Brochet as Catherine
- Roger Dumas as Manu
- Pierre-François Duméniaud as Max
- Pierre Nougaro as Gustave
- Renée Dennsy as Émilie
- Yvonne Décade as Antoinette
- Blanche Ariel as Rosette
- René Marjac as Maurice
- Paul Vally as Henry
- Denise Pezzani as Mme Lemonier

== Reception ==
The film received mixed reviews. Time Out said "Chabrol frames the verbal sparring with characteristic precision, but the subtle plot suffers from a surfeit of politesse and a dearth of red-blooded passion." The New York Times called it "something practically unheard of in the vast Chabrol filmography: a thriller that satisfies the audience's expectations of a thriller, even including the childlike hope that good will be rewarded and evil punished", and added "although the suspense is skillfully engineered, you can't help feeling Mr. Chabrol's boredom with it." Jonathan Rosenbaum said it was "good, serviceable, quasi-Hitchcockian fun", but not especially memorable. Craig Williams on the BFI site was more positive: "The idea of the bourgeois mask concealing murderous impulses is prevalent throughout the director’s work, but there’s a streak of self-awareness in Masques... that marks this as one of his best films of the 80s."
