= The Hatter's Ghost =

- Theatrical release poster
- Directed by: Claude Chabrol
- Screenplay by: Claude Chabrol
- Based on: Les fantômes du chapelier by Georges Simenon
- Starring: Michel Serrault; Charles Aznavour; Monique Chaumette
- Cinematography: Jean Rabier
- Edited by: Monique Fardoulis
- Music by: Matthieu Chabrol
- Production companies: Philippe Grumbach Productions; S.F.P.C. Films A2
- Distributed by: Gaumont Distribution
- Release date: May 25, 1982
- Running time: 120 minutes
- Country: France
- Language: French
- Box office: $2.9 million

The Hatter's Ghost (French: "Les fantômes du chapelier") is a 1982 French crime film directed by Claude Chabrol. It is based on the 1947 story Le Petit Tailleur et le Chapelier by Georges Simenon. It takes place in Brittany and was shot in the towns of Concarneau and Quimper.

== Plot ==
Labbé, a hatter in a French provincial town, appears to lead the life of a respectable citizen but is in fact a serial murderer. The only person to suspect this is his neighbour, Kachoudas, an Armenian tailor. After Labbé kills his own wife, he kills six of her friends to stop them from visiting her and prepares to murder a seventh, who dies naturally. As a substitute, he murders the maid. Labbé soon confesses his crime to the dying Kachoudas. After getting drunk, he visits his favourite prostitute, Berthe, and kills her; he is found at the scene of the crime in the morning by police.

== Principal cast ==
Actor	Role
Michel Serrault	Léon Labbé
Charles Aznavour	Kachoudas
Monique Chaumette	Madame Labbé
François Cluzet	Jeantet
Isabelle Sadoyan	Alice Kachoudas
Jean Champion	Senator Laude
Bernard Dumaine	Arnoult
Aurore Clément	Berthe

== Critical reception ==
TV Guide rated the film with 2 1/2 out of 5 stars and commented:

Another Claude Chabrol film that neither fails nor lives up to his previous successes (LES BICHES, among others). Again he pays homage to Hitchcock with a psychopath, Michel Serrault, who murders his wife, then kills six of her elderly friends.

From Time Out London:

The hatter (Serrault) is a mass strangler who allows his secret to be discovered by hangdog Cachoudas (Aznavour), the tubercular Armenian tailor opposite. The ensuing relationship seems unbelievably reckless, even with a mad hatter involved, and manifestly it's the Hitchcocko-Jesuitical theology about shared guilt which animates the picture... Chabrol locates his adaptation in an off-kilter time zone – little bit '30s, little bit '50s – that some may find the most intriguing aspect of the movie.
