= The Breach (film) =

1970 film by Claude Chabrol

- Release poster
- La Rupture
- Directed by: Claude Chabrol
- Screenplay by: Claude Chabrol
- Based on: The Balloon Man by Charlotte Armstrong
- Produced by: André Génovès
- Starring: Stéphane Audran; Jean-Pierre Cassel; Michel Bouquet; Annie Cordy
- Cinematography: Jean Rabier
- Edited by: Jacques Gaillard
- Music by: Pierre Jansen
- Distributed by: Gaumont Distribution
- Release date: 26 August 1970 (France)
- Running time: 125 minutes
- Countries: France; Belgium; Italy
- Language: French
- Box office: $5,566,068

The Breach (French: La Rupture), also titled The Breakup, is a 1970 drama and psychological thriller film written and directed by Claude Chabrol, based on the novel The Balloon Man by Charlotte Armstrong. It follows a mother's struggle for custody of her son while her father-in-law hires an unscrupulous fixer to compromise her.

== Plot ==
Hélène is married to Charles Régnier, a failed author whose drug addiction has affected his sanity. She is the one providing for their family. When Charles assaults her and injures their young son Michel in a violent outburst, Hélène beats Charles to the floor with a frying pan before escaping with Michel.

Initiating divorce proceedings, Hélène seeks legal assistance from attorney Allan Jourdan, who, despite her financial constraints, supports her case. Seeking new accommodation, she is directed by Jourdan to a boarding house near the hospital where Michel is recovering. Meanwhile, Charles' affluent and controlling parents, who had always disapproved of his marriage to the lower-class Hélène, put their son into permanent care at their home. With Charles incapacitated, his father Ludovic prepares for a legal battle, aiming to obtain custody of Michel.

In the antiquated, failing boarding house managed by Mrs. Pinelli and her alcoholic husband, Hélène finds some support from the other, eccentric tenants: a trio of old ladies and an out-of-work actor. Ludovic Régnier hires Paul Thomas, the disreputable son of a former business partner, to dig up compromising information on Hélène and prove that she is an unfit mother. As Hélène was briefly an exotic dancer in her youth, Régnier is convinced that his daughter-in-law must lead a dubious life.

Paul, claiming to be gravely ill and an outpatient at the hospital, befriends Hélène. He moves into the boarding house, where he ingratiates himself with the Pinellis by furnishing alcohol to the husband and making the wife believe that Ludovic Régnier is willing to save their business. Paul investigates Hélène's life, but her behavior proves irreproachable. He then orchestrates a plot to tarnish Hélène's reputation, beginning with spreading gossip among the boarding house residents and implying that Hélène is promiscuous and a lesbian child molester.

Paul is an amateur manipulator and while his schemes sow confusion, they prove too convoluted to work. Hélène finds out that he is not being treated at the hospital and understands that he is spying on her. Paul then decides to put into action his master plan to compromise Hélène: he drugs Élise, the Pinellis' intellectually disabled teenage daughter, and has his girlfriend Sonia, dressed up as Hélène, sexually abuse Élise in order to frame Hélène.

Hélène goes to the Régniers' family home and, despite their opposition, manages to briefly reunite with her still ailing husband. Charles tearfully apologizes and expresses his wish to live again with Hélène and their son.

Back at the boarding house, Paul drugs Hélène's drink to incapacitate her. He then tries to get Élise to accuse Hélène in front of the other residents. But despite her disability and having been drugged herself, Élise is able to understand that her abuser was another "Hélène" and unwittingly exposes Paul's machinations. Under the drug's influence, Hélène wanders and hallucinates in a nearby park, where she is rescued by the three old ladies and a kindly balloon vendor.

Charles, determined to see Hélène again, escapes from the family home, causing his mother to fatally fall down the stairs. Still in a daze, he breaks into the boarding house and stumbles upon Paul, whom he assaults. Paul panicks and fatally stabs Charles. Hélène and the old ladies, who have just returned home from the park, witness the killing; Paul flees in horror.

The concluding scene depicts Hélène, still confused by the effects of the drug, walking in the street and talking to herself, saying that she has to see her son.

== Cast ==
- Stéphane Audran as Hélène Régnier
- Jean-Pierre Cassel as Paul Thomas
- Michel Bouquet as Ludovic Régnier
- Marguerite Cassan as Émilie Régnier
- Annie Cordy as Mrs. Pinelli
- Jean-Claude Drouot as Charles Régnier
- Jean Carmet as Henri Pinelli
- Catherine Rouvel as Sonia
- Michel Duchaussoy as Allan Jourdan
- Margo Lion, Louise Chevalier and Maria Michi as the old ladies
- Mario David as Gérard Mostelle, the actor
- Katia Romanoff as Élise Pinelli
- Angelo Infanti as Dr. Blanchard
- Dominique Zardi as balloon vendor
- Daniel Lecourtois as Maraîcher, Ludovic Régnier's lawyer
- Laurent Brunschwick as Michel Régnier
- Serge Bento as police detective
- Harry Kümel as cab driver
- Claude Chabrol as man in the tramway

== Production ==
A French-Belgian-Italian coproduction, The Breach was filmed in Brussels and Paris.

== Release ==
The Breach was released on 26 August 1970 in France, where it had a total of 927,678 admissions. On 4 October 1973, it premiered at the New York Film Festival.

The film was long unavailable on home video until it was included by Paris-based Tamasa Distribution in "Première Vague" a collection of blu-ray discs of seven early films by Chabrol. The box set was released in France on November 18, 2025.

== Reception ==
Upon the film's premiere at the New York Film Festival, Vincent Canby of The New York Times wrote a sympathetic yet mixed review. While acknowledging that it has "many beautiful things in it", the "disadvantages and indignities are piled so thickly on the poor heroine that one knows early that the film is obliged to offer her vindication", which itself "isn't surprising or touching enough to transform the melodrama of "La Rupture" into tragedy".

In his 1985 review for the Chicago Reader, Dave Kerr's resume was thoroughly positive, calling La Rupture one of Chabrol's key films of the 1970s and a "most audacious experiment with narrative form… which begins with clear black/white, good/evil distinctions and then gradually self-destructs, breaking down into increasingly elliptical and imponderable fragments".

In her book Claude Chabrol's Aesthetics of Opacity (2018), Catherine Dousteyssier-Khoze sees Chabrol "veering away from any realist anchoring and venturing into the realm of the symbolic". With the film being strongly influenced by the fairy tale, the characters become markers of this genre, with Hélène as the "beautiful princess or good fairy", Paul Thomas as "the evil witch", the ladies at the boarding house as Parcae and Ludovic Régnier as "the incarnation of pure evil".
