= Innocents with Dirty Hands =

- Theatrical Release Poster
- Directed by: Claude Chabrol
- Written by: Claude Chabrol
- Based on: The Damned Innocents by Richard Neely
- Produced by: André Génovès
- Starring: Romy Schneider; Rod Steiger
- Cinematography: Jean Rabier
- Edited by: Jacques Gaillard
- Music by: Pierre Jansen
- Production companies: Jupiter Generale Cinematografica; Les Films La Boëtie; Terra-Filmkunst
- Distributed by: Les Films La Boëtie
- Release date: 26 March 1975 (France)
- Running time: 121 minutes (France); 102 minutes (U.S.)
- Countries: France; Italy; West Germany

Innocents with Dirty Hands a.k.a. Dirty Hands, or in the original French Les innocents aux mains sales, is a 1975 psychological thriller film written and directed by Claude Chabrol from a novel The Damned Innocents by Richard Neely. It stars Romy Schneider and Rod Steiger.

== Plot ==
Louis, a rich man who lives quietly in St Tropez with his beautiful young wife Julie, has cardiac and alcohol problems. They sleep in separate rooms and, when she meets Jeff, a writer, she starts an affair with him. The two decide that she will knock the sleeping Louis unconscious and that Jeff, after dumping the body off a boat, will lie low in Italy. To her dismay, Jeff disappears and, with him, all of Louis' money: she is left without husband, lover, or assets and under police surveillance as a suspect.

Then Louis reappears, apparently fit and alcohol-free: he says he knocked Jeff unconscious and took him to the boat where, after extracting a written confession, he killed him. Claiming that he now wants to be a good husband to Julie, they make love for the first time in years and forgive each other. Then Jeff reappears, with a gun, saying that on the boat Louis could not face killing him. He now wants Julie and the money, but Julie refuses and Louis has a fatal heart attack. As Jeff starts raping Julie, police appear and arrest him.

== Principal cast ==
Actor	Role
Romy Schneider	Julie Wormser
Rod Steiger	Louis Wormser
Jean Rochefort	Albert Légal, the advocate
François Maistre	Lamy, the police detective
Hans Christian Blech	The judge
François Perrot	Georges Thorent, the notary
Paolo Giusti	Jeff Marle
Henri Attal	Police Officer #1
Dominique Zardi	Police Officer #2

== Reception ==
The film had 553,910 admissions in France. Of the version shown in the United States, Vincent Canby of The New York Times wrote:

The peculiar state in which its American distributor has seen fit to release Claude Chabrol's Dirty Hands in New York prompts me to wonder whether I should review it or search for its pulse.... When you watch Romy calmly (and idiotically, if you know your crime stories) bludgeon her husband's blanketed form in the bed, without checking to see if he's actually in the bed, you may correctly suspect that Mr. Chabrol is having an off-day and probably an off-picture.... I have no idea how much the English dubbing and editing have damaged the original, but the Dirty Hands that opened yesterday at the Forum and other theaters is a junk movie.
