= Ophélia (1963 film) =

1963 film by Claude Chabrol

- Directed by: Claude Chabrol
- Written by: Claude Chabrol; Paul Gégauff
- Produced by: Jean Lavie
- Starring: Alida Valli; Claude Cerval; André Jocelyn; Juliette Mayniel
- Cinematography: Jean Rabier
- Edited by: Jacques Gaillard
- Music by: Pierre Jansen
- Production company: Boréal Films
- Distributed by: Lux Compagnie Cinématographique de France
- Release date: 6 February 1963
- Running time: 103 minutes
- Country: France
- Language: French

Ophélia is a 1963 French drama film directed by Claude Chabrol. The story centers on a disturbed young man who becomes obsessed with the idea that his life mirrors that of the title character of William Shakespeare's play Hamlet.

== Plot ==
After the death of his father, a rich factory owner, Yvan's mother Claudia marries his uncle Adrien. Yvan, a troubled young man unwilling to accept the marriage, becomes convinced that his mother and her new husband killed his father. He descends into a fantasy world, imposing the story and the characters of Shakespeare's Hamlet onto the people around him. Lucie, the daughter of the family's groundskeeper, is reluctant when Yvan declares her to be his Ophelia, although she shares his feeling of affection. After confronting his mother and stepfather with his accusation in the shape of a short film he produced (analogue to the Mousetrap play in Hamlet), Adrien intends to kill Yvan but, unable to do so, poisons himself instead. On his deathbed, Adrien rejects the murder accusation but confesses to Yvan that he is his biological father. Yvan, regretting his assumption and devastated, asks Lucie to comfort and look after him, to which she agrees, emphasising that she is Lucie, not Ophelia.

== Cast ==
- Alida Valli as Claudia Lesurf
- Claude Cerval as Adrien Lesurf
- André Jocelyn as Yvan Lesurf
- Juliette Mayniel as Lucie Lagrange
- Robert Burnier as André Lagrange
- Jean-Louis Maury as Sparkos
- Liliane Dreyfus as Ginette
- Serge Bento as François
- Sacha Briquet as Gravedigger

== Reception ==
Although completed before Chabrol's next film Landru, Ophélia was released after the latter and met neither with the audience's nor the critics' approval. Depending on the source, the film had between 6,000 and 8,000 admissions in Paris.

Upon the film's 1974 New York opening, 11 years after its French release, New York Times critic Nora Sayre rated it an "equally boring and pretentious" film with an unconvincing leading actor André Jocelyn, finding merit only in Jean Rabier's camerawork. Another 11 years later, Jonathan Rosenbaum of the Chicago Reader came to a different conclusion, calling it an "underrated and unsettling" early work of its director. In a 2001 interview with Peter Lennon of The Guardian, Chabrol himself called it an "execrable" work, while on another occasion, he stated that he liked the film, although it "wasn't quite what we wanted", explaining that he emphasised the humorous side of what had originally been planned as a more serious project.
