= Monique Chaumette =

French actress (born 1927)

- Born: 4 April 1927 (age 99); Paris, France
- Occupation: Actress
- Years active: 1958–present
- Spouse: Philippe Noiret (m. 1962; died 2006)

Monique Chaumette (born 4 April 1927) is a French actress. She appeared in more than forty films since 1958. She was married to Philippe Noiret from 1962 until his death in 2006.

== Selected filmography ==
Film
Year	Title	Role	Notes
2016	Alone in Berlin	Frau Rosenthal	
2011	Delicacy		
2010	Turk's Head		
1987	Masks		
1987	Beatrice		
1984	A Sunday in the Country		
1982	The Hatter's Ghost		
1981	Clara et les Chics Types	Louise's mother	
1977	Solemn Communion		
1977	The Lacemaker		
1975	Let Joy Reign Supreme		
1974	Don't Touch the White Woman!		
1973	La Grande Bouffe		
1970	The Confession		
1969	Mr. Freedom		
1965	The Sleeping Car Murders		
