= Wise Guys (1961 film) =

- Directed by: Claude Chabrol
- Written by: Claude Chabrol; Paul Gégauff; Eric Ollivier (novel)
- Starring: Jean-Claude Brialy; Bernadette Lafont; Charles Belmont
- Cinematography: Jean Rabier
- Music by: Pierre Jansen; Maurice Le Roux
- Release date: 1961
- Running time: 99 minutes
- Country: France
- Language: French

Wise Guys (original title: Les Godelureaux) is a 1961 French revenge drama directed by Claude Chabrol. It is based on the novel by Éric Ollivier.

== Plot ==
Ronald (Jean-Claude Brialy) is publicly humiliated by Arthur (Charles Belmont) and plots to destroy Arthur's life, using Ambroisine (Bernadette Lafont) as bait.

== Cast ==
- Jean-Claude Brialy as Ronald
- Bernadette Lafont as Ambroisine
- Charles Belmont as Arthur
- Jean Galland as Arthur's uncle
- Pierre Vernier as Bernard 2
- Sacha Briquet as Henri
- Stéphane Audran as Xavière
- Jean Tissier as le président
- Laura Carli as Aunt Suzanne
