= The Third Lover =

1962 film by Claude Chabrol

L'Œil du malin
- French film poster
- Directed by: Claude Chabrol
- Written by: Claude Chabrol; Paul Gégauff
- Produced by: Georges de Beauregard; Carlo Ponti
- Starring: Jacques Charrier; Walter Reyer; Stéphane Audran
- Cinematography: Jean Rabier
- Edited by: Jacques Gaillard
- Music by: Pierre Jansen
- Production companies: Rome-Paris Films; Compagnia Cinematografica Champion; Lux Compagnie Cinématographique de France
- Release date: 4 May 1962
- Running time: 75 minutes
- Country: France
- Language: French

The Third Lover (French: L'Œil du malin), also titled The Eye of Evil, is a 1962 French–Italian crime drama film directed by Claude Chabrol. It tells the story of a French journalist in Southern Germany who befriends a novelist and his wife and gradually begins to destroy the couple's lives.

== Plot ==
Albin, a solitary French journalist, is sent to Germany to write an article on noted novelist Andreas Hartmann, who lives in a village outside Munich. Albin rents a flat in the same village and, through Hartmann's French wife Hélène, becomes acquainted with the writer and successively the couple's friend. Obsessed to find the dark spot behind their seemingly harmonious marriage, he makes advances to Hélène and, after she tactfully rejects him, spies upon her, convinced that she has an affair. He finally succeeds to detect Hélène and her lover and takes compromising photographs, which he presents to her. Hélène pretends that Andreas knows of her affair but asks Albin not to show the pictures to her husband, explaining that their marriage gave both a mainstay after living a life of instability. Albin confronts Andreas with the photographs, who in a fit of rage stabs Hélène to death and then turns himself over to the police. Trying to find redemption for his scheme, Albin accuses himself for being responsible for Hélène's death, but is ignored by the police. In the final voice-over, Albin states that he was unable to find work as a journalist afterwards.

== Cast ==
- Jacques Charrier as Albin Mercier
- Walther Reyer as Andreas Hartmann
- Stéphane Audran as Hélène
- Daniel Boulanger as the Commissioner

== Production and reception ==
The Third Lover was written by Chabrol and Paul Gégauff under their mutual pseudonym Matthieu Martial and shot on a modest budget. It met with condescending reviews upon its 1962 release and turned out a financial failure.

In Robin Wood and Michael Walker's retrospective analysis in Claude Chabrol (1970), they compare The Third Lover with Roman Polanski's Knife in the Water, which came out a year later. They write, "Knife in the Water was an enormous art house success, l'Oeil du matin a complete box office failure. Both describe a triangle in which a man attaches himself to a married couple and the acting-out of tensions that arise. To my mind L’Oeil du matin is overwhelmingly superior, it has a richness and complexity of characterisation that Polanski does not even approach. Here the marriage is given a definite, positive value: without doubt Andreas’s reaction to the photographs -'Happiness is fragile' - is the most moving moment in the film. In Knife in the Water the marriage has been devalued to almost nothing. And where Chabrol demonstrates (as in so many of his films) the confusion between appearances, and the reality inside the characters, one feels very little sense of there being anything inside Polanski’s characters. Man and youth are reduced to a common childishness; the woman is simply a femme-objet."
