= Jean Rabier =

French cinematographer (1927–2016)

- Born: 16 March 1927; Montfort-l'Amaury, France
- Died: 15 February 2016 (aged 88); Port-de-Bouc, France
- Occupation: Cinematography
- Years active: 1958–1991

Jean Rabier (16 March 1927 – 15 February 2016) was a French cinematographer who frequently worked with director Claude Chabrol. He had almost 70 film credits spanning a career from 1961 to 1991.

He died on 15 February 2016 at the age of 89.

== Selected filmography ==
- Madame Bovary (1991)
- Dr. M (1990)
- Jours tranquilles à Clichy (Quiet Days in Clichy) (1990)
- Une affaire de femmes (Story of Women) (1988)
- Le Cri du hibou (The Cry of the Owl) (1987)
- Masques (Masks) (1987)
- Inspecteur Lavardin (1986)
- Poulet au vinaigre (Chicken with Vinegar) (1985)
- Les Fantômes du chapelier (The Hatters's Ghost) (1982)
- Le Cheval d'orgueil (The Proud Ones / The Horse of Pride) (1980)
- Violette Nozière (Violette) (1978)
- Les Liens de sang (Blood Relatives) (1978)
- Alice ou la dernière fugue (Alice / Alice or The Last Escapade) (1977)
- Folies bourgeoises (The Twist) (1976)
- Les Magiciens (Death Rite) (1976)
- Les Innocents aux mains sales (Dirty Hands / Innocents with Dirty Hands) (1975)
- Une partie de plaisir (A Piece of Pleasure / Pleasure Party) (1975)
- Nada (The Nada Gang) (1974)
- Les Noces rouges (Wedding in Blood) (1973)
- Docteur Popaul (Scroundel in White / High Heels / Play Now, Play Later) (1972)
- La Décade prodigieuse (Ten Days Wonder) (1971)
- Juste avant la nuit (Just Before Nightfall) (1971)
- Cold Sweat (1970)
- La Rupture (The Breach / Hallucination / The Breakup) (1970)
- Le Boucher (The Butcher) (1970)
- Que la bête meure (This Man Must Die) (1969)
- La Femme infidèle (The Unfaithful Wife) (1969)
- Les Biches (The Does / Bad Girls / Girlfriends) (1968)
- La Route de Corinthe (The Road to Corinth) (1967)
- Le Scandale (The Champagne Murders) (1967)
- La Ligne de démarcation (Line of Demarcation) (1966)
- Le Tigre se parfume à la dynamite (An Orchid for the Tiger / Our Agent Tiger) (1965)
- Marie-Chantal contre le docteur Kha (Marie-Chantal vs. Doctor Kha) (1965)
- Paris vu par... (Six in Paris) (segment La Muette) (1965)
- Le Tigre aime la chair fraîche (Code Name: Tiger / The Tiger Likes Fresh Meat) (1964)
- Les parapluies de Cherbourg (The Umbrellas of Cherbourg) (1964)
- Les Plus Belles Escroqueries du monde (The World's Most Beautiful Swindlers) (segment L'Homme qui vendit la tour Eiffel) (1964)
- Ophélia (1963)
- La Baie des Anges (Bay of Angels) (1963)
- Landru (Bluebeard) (1963)
- L'Œil du Malin (The Eye of Evil) (1962)
- Cléo de 5 à 7 (Cléo from 5 to 7) (1962)
- Les Sept Péchés capitaux (The Seven Deadly Sins) (segment L'Avarice) (1962)
- Les Godelureaux (Wise Guys) (1961)
- Le Beau Serge (Handsome Serge / Bitter Reunion) (1958) — also with Henri Decaë
