= The Seven Deadly Sins (1962 film) =

Les Sept péchés capitaux
- Directed by: Philippe de Broca; Claude Chabrol; Jacques Demy; Sylvain Dhomme; Max Douy; Jean-Luc Godard; Edouard Molinaro; Roger Vadim
- Written by: Daniel Boulanger; Claude Chabrol; Jacques Demy; Jean-Luc Godard; Eugène Ionesco; Félicien Marceau; Roger Peyrefitte
- Produced by: Jean Lavie; Claude Mauriac; Tonio Suné
- Cinematography: Henri Decaë; Louis Miaille; Jean Penzer; Giovanni Pucci; Jean Rabier
- Edited by: Jean Feyte; Jacques Gaillard
- Music by: Sacha Distel; Pierre Jansen; Michel Legrand
- Distributed by: Pathé Consortium Cinéma
- Release date: 1962
- Running time: 113 minutes
- Country: France
- Language: French
- Box office: $9.9 million

Les Sept péchés capitaux is a 1962 French film composed of seven different segments, one for each of the seven deadly sins, each being by different directors and featuring different casts. At the time it served as a showcase for rising directors and stars, many of whom achieved later fame.

== Segments ==
=== Anger ===
Directed by Sylvain Dhomme and Max Douy from a script by Eugène Ionesco. Anger seizes a man who finds a fly in his Sunday soup. It spreads through his neighborhood, his city, his country and soon the whole world.

=== Envy ===
Directed by Édouard Molinaro. Starring Dany Saval (Rosette) and Claude Brasseur (Riri). Envious of a movie star who is staying at the hotel where she works, the waitress Rosette does everything she can to seduce the actress's lover. Some time later, after having realized her ambition, she returns to the hotel as a client.

=== Sloth ===
Written and directed by Jean-Luc Godard. Eddie Constantine, who plays himself, is approached by a starlet who he takes to his home with well-stated intentions. But the hero's laziness is so relentless that nothing untoward happens.

=== Lust ===
Directed by Jacques Demy from a script by himself and Roger Peyrefitte. Jacques (Laurent Terzieff) and Bernard (Jean-Louis Trintignant) search for the definition of lust in a reproduction of The Garden of Earthly Delights by Hieronymus Bosch. Bernard recalls his childhood with his parents (Jean Desailly and Micheline Presle), when he confused lust with luxury. Also features Nicole Berger.

=== Pride ===
Directed by Roger Vadim from a script by Félicien Marceau. A woman (Marina Vlady) leaves her lover (Sami Frey) to return to her husband (Jean-Pierre Aumont) who cheats on her, something that his pride can not admit.

=== Gluttony ===
Directed by Philippe de Broca from a script by Daniel Boulanger. Valentin (Georges Wilson) travels to the burial of his father who died of indigestion, but stopping to eat on the way causes him to be late for the meal which follows the funeral.

=== Greed ===
Directed and scripted by Claude Chabrol. A group of university students in Paris dream of a night of love with Suzon, whose rates are staggering. To raise the money, they organize a lottery among themselves so that at least the winner will enact their fantasy. Actors include Claude Berri, Jean-Claude Brialy, Jean-Pierre Cassel, Claude Rich, Jacques Charrier and Claude Chabrol himself as a pharmacist (the career his father wanted for him).
