= Death Rite =

- French theatrical release poster
- Directed by: Claude Chabrol
- Screenplay by: Claude Chabrol; Paul Gégauff
- Based on: Initiation au meurtre by Frédéric Dard
- Produced by: Tarak Ben Ammar; Jean Boujnah; Tablouti Temini
- Starring: Franco Nero; Jean Rochefort; Stefania Sandrelli; Gert Fröbe
- Cinematography: Jean Rabier
- Edited by: Monique Fardoulis
- Production companies: Carthago Films S.a.r.l. Maran Film; Mondial Televisione Film
- Distributed by: S.N. Prodis
- Release date: 12 May 1976
- Running time: 94 minutes
- Countries: France; Italy; West Germany
- Language: French

Death Rite (French: Les Magiciens) is a 1976 psychological thriller film co-written and directed by Claude Chabrol, and based on the novel Initiation au meurtre by Frédéric Dard.

== Plot ==
At a luxury hotel in Djerba, Tunisia, psychic magician Vestar (Fröbe) meets the dark Edouard (Rochefort). Heading to the hotel, Vestar has a vision of a woman being murdered in the desert. Edouard, a member of the leisure class, decides to use his influence to make the dream become a reality. Also staying at the resort are Sadry, returning (Nero) who has come home to visit his dying mother, and his annoying wife Sylvia (Sandrelli). Also there is Martine (von Weitershausen), an ex-lover of Sadry who would like to get back together with him. The marriage is further strained when Sylvia finds the two of them together. It appears that the prophesied murder has something to do with Sylvia. Specific details from Vestar's prediction about her death are used by Edouard to make it happen, although in fact his interference alters the results. Sadry comes to terms with her tensions and anger as events build toward the inevitable.

== Principal cast ==
Actor	Role
Franco Nero	Sadry
Stefania Sandrelli	Sylvia
Jean Rochefort	Edouard
Gert Fröbe	Vestar
Gila von Weitershausen	Martine

== Reception ==
The film was a commercial failure, with only 51,682 tickets sold in France.
