= Andreas Staier =

German musician

Andreas Staier (born 13 September 1955 in Göttingen) is a German pianist and harpsichordist.

== Life ==
Staier studied piano and harpsichord in the Hochschule für Musik in Hanover and Amsterdam. He studied piano with Kurt Bauer and Erika Haase, and harpsichord with Lajos Rovatkay.

From 1983 to 1986 he was the harpsichord soloist for the ensemble Musica Antiqua Köln, touring frequently. At the same time he continued his studies in interpretation of classical and post-classical music on the fortepiano. He resigned from the ensemble in 1986 to embark on his solo career on both harpsichord and fortepiano. He became a touring fortepiano soloist, an accompanist for lieder, and a piano soloist for the ensemble Les Adieux. Between 1987 and 1996 he was Dozent for Cembalo at the Schola Cantorum Basiliensis in Basel.

Staier has gained a reputation as a distinguished harpsichordist, fortepiano soloist, and chamber music performer. His repertoire includes the music of the 17th, 18th and 19th centuries. As soloist he has performed with Concerto Köln, the Freiburg Barockorchester, the Akademie für Alte Musik Berlin, and the Orchestre des Champs-Elysées Paris.

In the field of chamber music he has had a partnerships with such artists as Christoph Prégardien, Anne Sofie von Otter, Pedro Memelsdorff, Alexei Lubimov and Christine Schornsheim.

Staier has made a number of recordings, primarily of music from the Baroque through early Romantic eras, and he has performed often on the BBC.

He was awarded the Preis der Deutschen Schallplattenkritik (2002 and 2011) and the Prätorius Musikpreis (2008). His Mozart recording 'am Stein Vis-à-vis' was awarded a Diapason d'Or of the year 2007.
