= Cop au Vin =

1985 French film

- Film poster
- Directed by: Claude Chabrol
- Written by: Claude Chabrol; Dominique Roulet
- Produced by: Marin Karmitz
- Starring: Jean Poiret
- Cinematography: Jean Rabier
- Edited by: Monique Fardoulis
- Release date: 10 April 1985
- Running time: 119 minutes
- Country: France
- Language: French
- Box office: $5.7 million

Cop au Vin (French: Poulet au vinaigre) is a 1985 French crime film directed by Claude Chabrol. It was entered into the 1985 Cannes Film Festival. The original French title is a pun: it literally means "vinegar chicken," but "poulet" is also French slang for "cop." The English title is also a pun on coq au vin. Chabrol made a sequel in 1986 titled Inspecteur Lavardin.

== Plot ==
In a small town in France, Louis lives in a large tumbledown house where he looks after his disabled and eccentric mother and works by day as the postman. Henriette, the post office clerk, keeps trying to inveigle him, but he spends his evenings tending to his mother's demands and spying on his three enemies: the lawyer Lavoisier, the doctor Morasseau, and the butcher Filiol, three leading citizens who have formed a syndicate to buy and develop Louis' house. As he and his mother refuse all offers from this unpleasant trio, the two are subject to continual harassment.

One day when Filiol is particularly obnoxious, Louis puts sugar in the tank of his car during the night. A resulting accident kills the butcher and brings the police detective Lavardin to town. Not averse to beating and waterboarding suspects, he finds that the situation is considerably more complex than it originally seemed: the lawyer Lavoisier has a mistress, Anna, who is friendly with the doctor Morasseau's wife, Delphine, but women vanish in quick succession. After another accident, an unrecognisably charred corpse is recovered from Delphine's car. Deducing that it is in fact Anna's body, Lavardin has to work out where Delphine is and why she has disappeared.

The motive emerges when he learns that it was Delphine's money which the syndicate were relying on for their plans and that she was instead leaving to start a new life with a lover. Freshly arrived in Morasseau's garden is a plaster cast of a nude Delphine, in the base of which Lavardin finds her body. Henriette at last gets Louis into her bed, breaking his mother's hold over him, and Lavardin says he will forget about the sugar in the tank.

== Cast ==
- Jean Poiret as Inspecteur Jean Lavardin
- Stéphane Audran as Madame Cuno
- Michel Bouquet as Hubert Lavoisier
- Jean Topart as Docteur Philippe Morasseau
- Lucas Belvaux as Louis Cuno
- Pauline Lafont as Henriette
- Caroline Cellier as Anna Foscarie
- Andrée Tainsy as Marthe
- Jean-Claude Bouillaud as Gérard Filiol
- Jacques Frantz as Alexandre Duteil
- Josephine Chaplin as Delphine Morasseau
- Albert Dray as André, le barman
- Henri Attal as L'employé de la morgue
- Marcel Guy as Le maître d'hôtel
- Dominique Zardi as Henri Rieutord, chef de poste

== Reception ==
Jonathan Rosenbaum in the Chicago Reader said that the film "wasn't a masterpiece, but at the very least it was a well-crafted and satisfying entertainment", and that it had "sex, violence, dark wit, a superb sense of both the corruption and meanness of life in the French provinces, a good whodunit plot, Balzacian characters... and very nice camera work by Jean Rabier." Time Out remarked that "it is all done with the skittishness which Chabrol brings to this kind of policier, but given edge by his very mocking eye." Variety said "the plotting here wouldn’t pass muster on an episode of PBS’ “Mystery!,” but there's pleasure to be had in veteran thesp Jean Poiret's soaked-in-vinegar turn as Lavardin, a gimlet-eyed sleuth with a violent streak that surfaces unexpectedly, yet always at just the right moments."

== Sequels ==
Chabrol directed a sequel, Inspecteur Lavardin, in 1986. It was followed by a four-part TV series, Les Dossiers de l'inspecteur Lavardin (1989–1990), also starring Jean Poiret.
