= Wedding in Blood =

1973 film by Claude Chabrol

- Theatrical release poster
- Directed by: Claude Chabrol
- Written by: Claude Chabrol
- Produced by: André Génovès
- Starring: Stéphane Audran; Michel Piccoli
- Cinematography: Jean Rabier
- Edited by: Jacques Gaillard; Monique Gaillard
- Music by: Pierre Jansen
- Distributed by: Cinema International Corporation
- Release date: 12 April 1973 (France)
- Running time: 95 minutes
- Country: France
- Language: French

Wedding in Blood (French: Les Noces rouges), also known as Red Wedding in the UK, is a 1973 French crime drama film written and directed by Claude Chabrol.

== Plot ==
In a small French town about 150 kilometres from Paris, the respected local notable Pierre Maury leaves his ailing wife Clotilde at home and drives into the woods for a passionate tryst with his lover Lucienne. Lucienne is married to Paul Delamare, a member of parliament and candidate for mayor, in whose house she also lives with her fifteen-year-old daughter Hélène Chevalier, born before Lucienne met Paul. Ahead of the election Delamare brings Maury onto his campaign team to secure left-wing support, and after his victory appoints him deputy mayor.

Delamare's frequent trips to Paris give the lovers opportunities to meet. On one occasion Maury arranges a rendezvous in a local castle that is a historic landmark, where they shoot a champagne cork at an antique painting and make love on a bed that is a museum exhibit. When the museum's directors complain, Delamare—unaware of the affair—assigns Maury to investigate the act of vandalism.

Meanwhile, under the pretext of caring for her, Maury secretly poisons Clotilde; when she dies, the townspeople assume she has taken her own life in despair. During Delamare's next absence, Lucienne spends the night at Maury's house, and her departure at dawn is noticed by Hélène. Delamare invites Maury to dinner to secure his backing for a lucrative investment project, but Maury has doubts about its legal soundness. After the meal Hélène tells her mother she believes Maury is her lover, which Lucienne flatly denies. At their next meeting Maury confesses to Lucienne that he killed his wife in order to be free, and that Delamare's project is outright fraud.

Returning home early one morning, Lucienne is met at the gate by her husband, who has come back unexpectedly and tells her he has guessed about the affair. Rather than reproach her, Delamare resolves to turn it to his advantage: he summons Maury to a meeting attended by Lucienne and proposes a bargain—the lovers may continue to meet, provided Maury delivers council support for the investment project.

When Delamare prepares for another trip to Paris, Lucienne insists on accompanying him and on driving. On a deserted night road she stops the car; Maury runs up and bludgeons Delamare to death with a club, then props the body behind the wheel, douses the car in petrol and pushes it into a deep ravine, where it bursts into flames. Maury drives off, leaving Lucienne in a torn dress beside the burning wreck, where a passing truck driver spots her. The police open an inquiry and question Lucienne, but a telephone call from Paris leads them to classify the death as a traffic accident, and the case is closed.

To avoid suspicion the lovers stop seeing each other and communicate only by letter. Once matters appear to have settled, Hélène, who has been troubled by rumours about her mother, confronts Lucienne; Lucienne admits the affair but denies any part in Delamare's death. Believing that an official inquiry will silence the gossip and clear her mother's name, Hélène writes to the prefect of police asking that the case be reopened. The intervention has the opposite effect: questioned at home, Lucienne at once confesses both to the affair and to having killed Delamare together with Maury. Maury is then arrested and tries to take all the blame upon himself. Sitting handcuffed beside Lucienne in the police car, he is asked by the inspector why they did not simply leave together for another town; they reply that the thought had never occurred to them.

== Cast ==
- Stéphane Audran as Lucienne Delamare
- Michel Piccoli as Pierre Maury
- Claude Piéplu as Paul Delamare
- Clotilde Joano as Clotilde Maury
- Eliana De Santis as Hélène Chevalier, Lucienne's daughter
- François Robert as Auriol
- Daniel Lecourtois as prefect

== Background ==
Wedding in Blood was filmed in the commune of Valençay. The story is based on a real event in the commune of Bourganeuf in 1970.

== Release ==
Wedding in Blood was released on April 12, 1973 in France. It was entered into the 23rd Berlin International Film Festival.

Paris-based Tamasa Distribution is set to release "Première Vague" a collection of blu-ray discs of seven early films by Chabrol. The box set is set for release in France on November 18, 2025. Variety reported that it would include films that were "long unavailable" to the public, including Wedding in Blood.
