= The Twist (1976 film) =

1976 film by Claude Chabrol

- French theatrical release poster
- Directed by: Claude Chabrol
- Screenplay by: Claude Chabrol; Ennio De Concini; Norman Enfield
- Based on: Le Malheur Fou by Lucie Faure
- Produced by: Alexander Salkind; Ilya Salkind; Pierre Spengler
- Starring: Bruce Dern; Stéphane Audran; Ann-Margret
- Cinematography: Jean Rabier
- Edited by: Monique Fardoulis
- Music by: Manuel De Sica
- Production companies: Barnabe; Central Cinema Company Film (CCC); Gloria
- Distributed by: FFCM
- Release date: 23 June 1976
- Running time: 107 minutes
- Countries: France; Italy; West Germany
- Languages: French; English

The Twist is a 1976 film co-written and directed by Claude Chabrol.Its title in French is Folies bourgeoises (literally - bourgeois madness).

== Plot ==
The film follows a bored, upper class group of Parisians who embark on a series of affairs with each other.

== Principal cast ==
Actor	Role
Bruce Dern	William Brandels
Stéphane Audran	Claire Brandels
Sydne Rome	Nathalie
Jean-Pierre Cassel	Jacques Lavolet, l'éditeur
Ann-Margret	Charlie Minerva
Maria Schell	Gretel
Francis Perrin	Robert Sartre
Sybil Danning	La secrétaire
Charles Aznavour	Dr. Lartigue
Curd Jürgens	Le bijoutier
Tomás Milián	Le détective
Claude Chabrol	Le client chez l'éditeur (uncredited)

== Critical reception ==
Glenn Davidson of Turner Classic Movies:

[T]he story cannot decide whether it is a romantic farce, a serious look at relationships, or a setup for a series of erotic daydreams experienced by a troubled married couple... The Twist is a confused and halfhearted comedy of manners that never decides on an approach to its subject... Although the film does have a few interesting moments, it is cluttered with pointless digressions and unfunny comedy.

Michael Barrett of PopMatters:

Chabrol's typical themes don't fit so well into wacky-comedy mode (given that French wacky comedies usually are no funnier than American ones) and not so easily into surreal-fantasy mode either. The chicly transgressive dreams seem intended to remind us of Luis Buñuel's French films of this era, but it suffers in the comparison. Where the film wants to be frothy and sexy, it looks grating. What tries to look smart looks dumb.
