= Erika Haase =

German classical pianist

Erika Haase (23 March 1935 – 1 May 2013) was a German classical pianist.

== Career ==
Born in Darmstadt, Haase was the daughter of a violinist. At the age of seven, she received her first piano lessons. In Darmstadt, she studied with Werner Hoppstock and Hans Leygraf. In 1959, she won the Kranichsteiner Musikpreis of the city of Darmstadt in the piano category. As a soloist and chamber musician she performed with the Swedish Radio Music Academy and various Swedish orchestras. Her centre of gravity was in a strong commitment to Neue Musik. In 1960, she participated in Eduard Steuermann's summer courses. She also improved her skill with Conrad Hansen. From 1963 to 1967, she spent long periods between London and Paris, where she collaborated with the BBC and Pierre Boulez.

From 1967 until her retirement in 2000, she taught at the Hanover University of Music, Drama and Media, first as a lecturer and then from 1974 as an appointed piano teacher. Gerrit Zitterbart, Andreas Staier and Ingo Metzmacher were among her many students. She had a close friendship with György Ligeti.

Haase died in Frankfurt at age 78.

== Discography ==
Haase recorded mainly for the Col Legno Musikproduktion, Gutingi, Thorofon and Tacet labels.

- Chopin, Préludes opus 28 (January 1987, Thorofon) OCLC 36820624
- Ligeti, Études pour piano (premier livre); Musica ricercata (10-13 septembre 1990, Col Legno AU-031 815 / Aurophon) OCLC 44721628, 889985151
- Ravel, Sérénade Grotesque, Prélude, Menuet, Miroirs, Gaspard de la Nuit (9-12 March 1992, Gutingi GUT205)
- Chopin, Études op. 10 and 25, Nouvelles études (1992? 1993, Thorofon CTH 2195)
- Scriabine, Vers la flamme, Sonatas for piano No 6 and 10; Olivier Messiaen, Cantéyodjayâ; Prokofiev, Sonata for piano No 8 (1996, Gutingi GUT 216) OCLC 825125249
- Jansen, L’Œuvre pour piano (1997, 2CD Triton TRI 331106) — with works by Colette Zerah-Jansen, performed by herself. First world recording.
- Études pour piano, vol. I: Igor Stravinsky (Études op. 7); Bela Bartók (Études op. 18); Olivier Messiaen (Quatre études de rythme); György Ligeti (Books I & II) (1997, Tacet) OCLC 45119622
- Études pour piano, vol. II : Witold Lutosławski (Deux études); Alexandre Scriabin (3 études, op. 65); György Ligeti (third book: études 15 and 16); Claude Debussy (12 études) (2001, Tacet) OCLC 62303488
- Franz Liszt: Études pour piano, vol. III, Grandes études de Paganini (1851), Trois études (1849) and two concert études (1863) (2006, Tacet 150) OCLC 817742543
- Robert Schumann and Claude Debussy: Études pour piano, vol. IV - with Carmen Piazzini playing Debussy (2008 and 2009, Tacet) OCLC 555783716
- Johannes Brahms: Études pour piano, vol. V, (2012, Tacet) OCLC 819752874
