= Inspecteur Lavardin =

- Theatrical release poster
- Directed by: Claude Chabrol
- Written by: Claude Chabrol; Dominique Roulet
- Produced by: Marin Karmitz
- Starring: Jean Poiret; Jean-Claude Brialy
- Cinematography: Jean Rabier
- Edited by: Monique Fardoulis
- Music by: Matthieu Chabrol
- Production companies: CAB Productions; Films A2; MK2 Productions; Télévision Suisse-Romande (TSR)
- Distributed by: MK2 Diffusion
- Release date: 12 March 1986
- Running time: 100 min.
- Countries: France; Switzerland
- Language: French
- Box office: $5.3 million

Inspecteur Lavardin is a 1986 crime film co-written and directed by Claude Chabrol. It is the sequel to his 1984 film Cop au vin.

== Synopsis ==
The titular inspector travels to a small coastal town to investigate the puzzling death of a devout and wealthy Roman Catholic writer who is found murdered on a beach with the word pig written on his back. When Inspector Lavardin arrives to investigate, he discovers that the widow, Helene, is an old flame he hasn't seen in 20 years. In the course of his probings, Lavardin inadvertently uncovers several metaphorical skeletons in the closet.

== Principal cast ==
Actor	Role
Jean Poiret	Inspecteur Jean Lavardin
Jean-Claude Brialy	Claude Alvarez
Bernadette Lafont	Hélène Mons
Jean-Luc Bideau	Max Charnet
Jacques Dacqmine	Raoul Mons
Hermine Clair	Véronique Manguin
Pierre-François Dumeniaud	Marcel Vigoroux

== Production ==
External shots were filmed in Dinard and Dinan. The film was co-written by Claude Chabrol (the writer behind Cop Au Vin) and Dominique Roulet.

== Critical reception ==
From Caryn James of The New York Times:

In the long, healthy career of Claude Chabrol, from his New Wave classic The Cousins through his sumptuous Madame Bovary, which opened yesterday, Inspector Lavardin is a trifle. But this lighthearted detective movie shows that trifling entertainments do not have to be hack work. This wily film has first-rate appeal and plays into some cherished stereotypes about the French: it is blase, stylish, filled with effortless charm... [T]here is nothing self-conscious about this cleverly sophisticated but straightforward use of the detective genre. Perhaps that is why, when the murderer is revealed, the episode is too Hitchcockian for its own good. It would take a lot more irony or homage to pull this off.

From Fred Camper of The Chicago Reader:

There are also some wonderfully characteristic images—the widow first appears behind glass, her face rendered at once more vivid and more distant, and an overhead shot of the murder scene lays out the geography while distancing us from the characters—but such moments are too few, and often Chabrol seems to be going through the motions.
