= Claude Chabrol =

French film director (1930–2010)

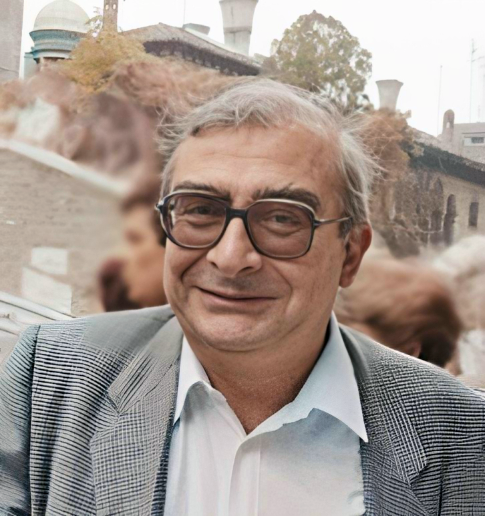
- Chabrol in 1985
- Born: Claude Henri Jean Chabrol; 24 June 1930; Paris, France
- Died: 12 September 2010 (aged 80); Paris, France
- Occupation: Film director
- Years active: 1956–2010
- Spouses: Agnès Goute (m. 1956; div. 1962) Stéphane Audran (m. 1964; div. 1980) Aurore Paquiss (m. 1983)
- Children: 4, including Thomas

Claude Henri Jean Chabrol (French: [klod ʃabʁɔl]; 24 June 1930 – 12 September 2010) was a French film director and a member of the French New Wave (nouvelle vague) group of filmmakers who first came to prominence at the end of the 1950s. Like his colleagues and contemporaries Jean-Luc Godard, François Truffaut, Éric Rohmer and Jacques Rivette, Chabrol was a critic for the influential film magazine Cahiers du Cinéma before beginning his career as a filmmaker.

His feature debut, Le Beau Serge (1958), was inspired by Hitchcock's Shadow of a Doubt (1943). Thrillers became a trademark for Chabrol, with an approach characterized by a distanced objectivity. This is especially apparent in Les Biches (1968), La Femme infidèle (1969), and Le Boucher (1970) – all featuring Stéphane Audran, who was his wife at the time.

Sometimes characterized as a "mainstream" nouvelle vague filmmaker, Chabrol remained prolific and popular throughout his half-century career. In 1978, he cast Isabelle Huppert as the lead in Violette Nozière. On the strength of that effort, the pair went on to others including the successful Madame Bovary (1991) and La Cérémonie (1995). Film critic John Russell Taylor has stated that "there are few directors whose films are more difficult to explain or evoke on paper, if only because so much of the overall effect turns on Chabrol's sheer hedonistic relish for the medium...Some of his films become almost private jokes, made to amuse himself." James Monaco has called Chabrol "the craftsman par excellence of the New Wave, and his variations upon a theme give us an understanding of the explicitness and precision of the language of the film that we don't get from the more varied experiments in genre of Truffaut or Godard."

== Life and career ==
=== Early life ===
Claude Henri Jean Chabrol was born on 24 June 1930 to Yves Chabrol and Madeleine Delarbre in Paris and grew up in Sardent, France, a village in the region of Creuse 400 km (240 miles) south of Paris. Chabrol said that he always thought of himself as a country person, and never as a Parisian. Both Chabrol's father and grandfather had been pharmacists, and Chabrol was expected to follow in the family business. But as a child, Chabrol was "seized by the demon of cinema" and ran a film club in a barn in Sardent between the ages of 12 and 14. It was at this time that he developed his passion for the thriller genre, detective stories and other forms of popular fiction.

=== Early years in Paris ===
After World War II, Chabrol moved to Paris to study pharmacology and literature at the Sorbonne, where he received a licence en lettres. Some biographies also state that he briefly studied law and political science at the École Libre des Sciences Politiques. While living in Paris Chabrol became involved with the postwar cine club culture and frequented Henri Langlois's Cinémathèque Française and the Ciné-Club du Quartier Latin, where he first met Éric Rohmer, Jacques Rivette, Jean-Luc Godard, François Truffaut and other future Cahiers du Cinéma journalists and French New Wave filmmakers. After graduating, Chabrol served his mandatory military service in the French Medical Corps, serving in Germany and reaching the rank of sergeant. Chabrol has said that while in the army he worked as a film projectionist. After he was discharged from the army, he joined his friends as a staff writer for Cahiers du Cinéma, who were challenging then-contemporary French films and championing the concept of Auteur theory. As a film critic, Chabrol advocated realism both morally and aesthetically, mise-en-scene, and deep focus cinematography, which he wrote "brings the spectator in closer with the image" and encourages "both a more active mental attitude on the part of the spectator and a more positive contribution on his part to the action in progress." He also wrote for Arts magazine during this period. Among Chabrol's most famous articles were "Little Themes", a study of genre films, and "The Evolution of Detective Films".

In 1955 Chabrol was briefly employed as a publicity man at the French offices of 20th Century Fox, but was told that he was "the worst press officer they'd ever seen" and was replaced by Jean-Luc Godard, who they said was even worse. In 1956 he helped finance Jacques Rivette's short film Le coup du berger, and later helped finance Rohmer's short Véronique et son cancre in 1958. Unlike all of his future New Wave contemporaries, Chabrol never made short film nor did he work as an assistant on other directors' work before making his feature film debut. In 1957 Chabrol and Eric Rohmer co-wrote Hitchcock (Paris: Éditions Universitaires, 1957), a study of the films made by director Alfred Hitchcock through the film The Wrong Man. Chabrol had said that Rohmer deserves the majority of the credit for the book, while he mainly worked on the sections pertaining to Hitchcock's early American films, Rebecca, Notorious, and Stage Fright. Chabrol had interviewed Hitchcock with François Truffaut in 1954 on the set of To Catch a Thief, where the two famously walked into a water tank after being starstruck by Hitchcock. Years later, when Chabrol and Truffaut had both become successful directors themselves, Hitchcock told Truffaut that he always thought of them when he saw "ice cubes in a glass of whiskey."

=== 1957–1967: Early film career ===
The most prolific of the major New Wave directors, Chabrol averaged almost one film a year from 1958 until his death. His early films (roughly 1958–1963) are usually categorized as part of the New Wave and generally have the experimental qualities associated with the movement; while his later early films are usually categorized as being intentionally commercial and far less experimental. In the mid-sixties it was difficult for Chabrol to obtain financing for films so he made a series of commercial "potboilers" and spy spoofs, which none of the other New Wave filmmakers did.

Chabrol had married Agnès Goute in 1952 and in 1957 his wife inherited a large sum of money from relatives. In December of that year Chabrol used the money to make his feature directorial debut with Le Beau Serge. Chabrol spent three months shooting in his hometown of Sardent using a small crew and little known actors. The film's budget was $85,000. The film starred Jean-Claude Brialy as François and Gérard Blain as Serge, two childhood friends reunited when the recent medical school graduate François returns to Sardent and discovers that Serge has become an alcoholic after the stillbirth of his physically retarded first child. Despite suffering from tuberculosis, François drags Serge through a snowstorm to witness the birth of his second child, thus giving Serge a reason to live while killing himself in the process. Le Beau Serge is considered the inaugural film of the French New Wave Film movement that would peak between 1959 and 1962. Chabrol was the first of his friends to complete a feature film (although Jacques Rivette had already begun filming his first feature Paris nous appartient), and it immediately received critical praise and was a box office success. It won the Grand Prix at the Locarno Film Festival and the Prix Jean Vigo. Critics noticed similarities to Hitchcock's films, such as the motifs of doubling and re-occurrences and the "Catholic guilt transference" that Chabrol had also written about extensively in his and Rohmer's book the year earlier. Chabrol stated that he made the film as a "farewell to Catholicism", and many critics have called his first film vastly different from any of his subsequent films.

Chabrol quickly followed this success up with Les Cousins in 1958. The film is a companion piece and a reversal to Le Beau Serge in many ways, such as having the responsible student Brialy now play the decadent and insensitive Paul while the reckless Blain now plays the hard-working law student Charles. In this film, the country cousin Charles arrives in the big city of Paris to live with his corrupt cousin Paul while attending school. This was the first of many Chabrol films to include characters named Paul and Charles, and later films would often include a female named Hélène. More so than his first film, Les Cousins features many characteristics that would be seen as "Chabrolian", including the Hitchcock influence, a depiction of the French bourgeoisie, characters with ambiguous motives and a murder. It was also Chabrol's first film co-written with his longtime collaborator Paul Gégauff, of whom Chabrol once said "when I want cruelty, I go off and look for Gégauff. Paul is very good at gingering things up...He can make a character look absolutely ridiculous and hateful in two seconds flat." Les Cousins was another box office success in France and won the Golden Bear at the 9th Berlin International Film Festival.

Chabrol formed his own production company AJYM Productions (acronym based on the initials of his wife's and children's names) at the time of making Le Beau Serge. After the success of Le Beau Serge and Les Cousins, Chabrol began funding many of the films of his friends. AJYM helped fund Eric Rohmer's feature debut The Sign of Leo, partially funded Rivette's Paris nous appartient, and Philippe de Broca's films Les Jeux de l'amour and Le farceur. He also donated excess film stock from Les Cousins to Rivette to complete Paris nous appartient. Chabrol was also a technical advisor on Jean-Luc Godard's feature debut Breathless and acted in small parts in many of his friends' and his own early films. For his support to the early careers of so many of his friends, Chabrol has been referred to as "the godfather of the French New Wave", although many film histories tend to overlook this contribution and dismiss Chabrol altogether.

After two box office hits in a row, Chabrol was given a big budget to make his first color film, À double tour (Léda) in the spring of 1959. The film stars Jean-Paul Belmondo as Laszlo and Antonella Lualdi as Léda, two outsiders of a bourgeois family who experience different results when attempting to enter that family. Chabrol adapted the script with Paul Gégauff from a novel by Stanley Ellin, and the film is known for its oedipal sex triangle and murder scenario. The film was shot on location in Aix-en-Provence with cinematographer Henri Decaë and includes choppy, hand-held camera footage that is atypical of a Chabrol film despite being present in many of the New Wave films made at the same time. The film was both a box office and critical disappointment, and critic Roy Armes criticized "Chabrol's lack of feeling for his characters and love of overacting."

In 1960 Chabrol made what is considered by many critics as his best early film, Les Bonnes Femmes. The film stars Bernadette Lafont, Clotilde Joano, Stéphane Audran and Lucile Saint-Simon as four Parisian appliance store employees who all dream of an escape from their mediocre lives, and the different outcomes for each girl. Most critics praised the film, such as Robin Wood and James Monaco. However some left-wing critics disliked Chabrol's depiction of working-class people and accused him of making fun of their lifestyles. The film was another box office disappointment for Chabrol. It was followed with two films that were also financially unsuccessful and which Chabrol has admitted to making purely for "commercial reasons". Les Godelureaux was made in 1960 and hated by Chabrol. The Third Lover (L'Œil du Malin), released in 1961, received better reviews than Chabrol's previous films, with critics pointing out that the films that Chabrol wrote without Paul Gégauff were much more compassionate and realistic than the ones with Gégauff. It was shot on location in Munich. Although she had appeared in supporting roles in several Chabrol films before, The Third Lover was the first Chabrol film in which Stéphane Audran appeared as the female lead. They later married in 1964 and worked together until the late 1970s.

In 1962 Chabrol made Ophelia, a loose adaptation of Hamlet that was another box office disappointment. Later that year he had a minor hit film with Landru, written by Françoise Sagan and starring Charles Denner, Michèle Morgan, Danielle Darrieux and Hildegard Knef. The film depicts the famous French serial killer Henri Désiré Landru, a story that had previously inspired Charlie Chaplin's film Monsieur Verdoux.

From 1964 to 1967 Chabrol made six films and one short that were critically and commercially disastrous, and this period is considered a low point of his career. Four of these films were in the then-popular genre of spy spoof films, including Le Tigre aime la chair fraiche and Le Tigre se parfume à la dynamite. Chabrol had said that "I like to get to the absolute limit of principles...In drivel like the Tiger series I really wanted to get the full extent of the drivel. They were drivel, so OK, let's get into it up to our necks." During this period a Variety headline read "Vital To Keep Making Pictures, and What Sort Not Relevant; Chabrol No 'Doctrinaire' Type." In 1965 Chabrol also contributed to the New Wave portmanteau film Six in Paris with the segment "La Muette". Chabrol co-starred with Stéphane Audran as a middle aged couple dealing with their rebellious teenage daughter. In 1964 Chabrol also directed a stage production of MacBeth for the Théâtre Récamier.

=== 1968–1978: "Golden Era" ===
In 1968 Chabrol began working with film producer André Génovès and started to make more critically acclaimed films that would later be considered his "Golden Era". Most of these films revolved around themes of bourgeois characters and a murder is almost always part of the plot. Unlike his earlier films, most of these films centered around middle aged people. Chabrol often worked with the same people during this period including actors Audran and Michel Bouquet, cinematographer Jean Rabier, editor Jacques Gaillard, sound technician Guy Chichignoud, composer Pierre Jansen, set designer Guy Littaye, as well as producer Génovés and co-writer Paul Gégauff.

In 1968 Chabrol made Les Biches, one of his most acclaimed works. The film stars Stéphane Audran as the dominant and bisexual Frédérique, who finds a young protege in the bisexual Why (Jacqueline Sassard), until they both become the lover of a young architect named Paul (Jean-Louis Trintignant). Why ends up killing Frédérique, but it is unclear whether she murdered her cheating lover or the person that her lover was cheating with. The film received critical praise and was a box office hit. Chabrol followed this with a similar film The Unfaithful Wife (La Femme infidèle), in which a husband named Charles murders the lover of his cheating wife. It was later remade in 2002 by director Adrian Lyne. Chabrol finished the decade with This Man Must Die (Que la bête meure) in 1969. Based on an original story by Cecil Day-Lewis, in the film Charles (Michel Duchaussoy) plots to kill Paul (Jean Yanne) after Paul killed Charles' son in a hit and run car accident. However the film's ending is left intentionally ambiguous, and Chabrol has stated that "you'll never see a Charles kill a Paul. Never." The film was especially praised for its landscape cinematography.

In 1970 Chabrol made The Butcher (Le boucher) starring Jean Yanne and Stéphane Audran. Yanne plays Popaul, a former war hero known for his violent behavior, much like that depicted in the prehistoric cave drawings that the characters look at in their Périgord community. The French newspaper Le Figaro called it "the best French film since the liberation." After another examination of bourgeois life in The Breach (La Rupture) in 1970, Chabrol made Just Before Nightfall (Juste avant la nuit) in 1971. The film stars Michel Bouquet as an ad executive named Charles who kills his mistress but cannot handle the guilt, so he confesses his crime to her husband (François Périer) and his wife (Stéphane Audran), expecting their condemnation. To his surprise they are only compassionate and forgiving to his crime and Charles cannot find relief from the guilt of what he has done. Later in 1971 Chabrol made Ten Days' Wonder (La Décade prodigieuse), based on a novel by Ellery Queen. The film was shot in English and starred Michel Piccoli, Anthony Perkins and Orson Welles. It received poor critical reviews. He followed this with the equally disliked Dr. Popaul, starring Jean-Paul Belmondo and Mia Farrow. Critics compared the film unfavorably with Chabrol's earlier film that centered on a "Landru-like" theme. Critic Jacques Siclier said that "the novelty of Docteur Popaul comes from the offhandedness with which the criminal history is treated."

Chabrol took a slight change of pace with his 1973 film Wedding in Blood (Les Noces rouges) by making his first film with political themes. The film stars Audran and Michel Piccoli as lovers who plot to murder Audran's husband, who is the corrupt gaullist mayor of their town. To their surprise the President of France orders that no investigation be made of the mayor's death, leading the murdering couple to suspect political interest in their crime. In the spring of 1973 the French government banned the film for one month, allegedly so that it would not influence members of the jury of a controversial criminal trial. Chabrol followed this political theme with Nada, in which a group of young anarchists kidnap an American ambassador. It was Chabrol's first film to not center on the bourgeois since Le Beau Serge. Chabrol returned to more familiar ground in 1975 with A piece of pleasure (Une partie de plaisir). In this film screenwriter Paul Gégauff plays a writer with a troubled marriage that ends in tragedy. (In 1983, Gégauff was stabbed to death in real life by his second wife.) Gégauff's wife is played by his real-life first wife Danièle Gégauff (already divorced when this film was made) and his daughter is played by real life daughter Clemence Gégauff. The film received poor critical reviews, with Richard Roud calling it "rather interestingly loathsome."

Chabrol ended his Golden Period with one of his most admired and his most controversial films Violette Nozière in 1978. The film starred a young Isabelle Huppert as a real life Parisian girl from a respectable petit-bourgeois family in the 1930s. At night Violette sneaks out to pick up men and eventually contracts syphilis, which she convinces her parents must be hereditary before she kills them. The film was controversial in France but praised in other countries.

=== 1979–2009: Later work ===
In the 1980s and 1990s Chabrol engaged himself with many different projects for both TV and the silver screen. His films Poulet au vinaigre (1985) and Masques (1987) were entered into the 38th Cannes Film Festival and 37th Berlin International Film Festival respectively. Madame Bovary (1991) was nominated for the Golden Globe Award for Best Foreign Language Film and for the Academy Award for Best Costume Design. It was also entered into the 17th Moscow International Film Festival. La Cérémonie (1995) is perhaps his most acclaimed film from this period, as it was nominated for numerous César Awards and was entered into the 52nd Venice International Film Festival among other. His 1999 film The Color of Lies was entered into the 49th Berlin International Film Festival.

In 1995 Chabrol was awarded the Prix René Clair from the Académie française for his body of work.

Chabrol continued directing films and TV series well into the 2000s.

== Personal life ==
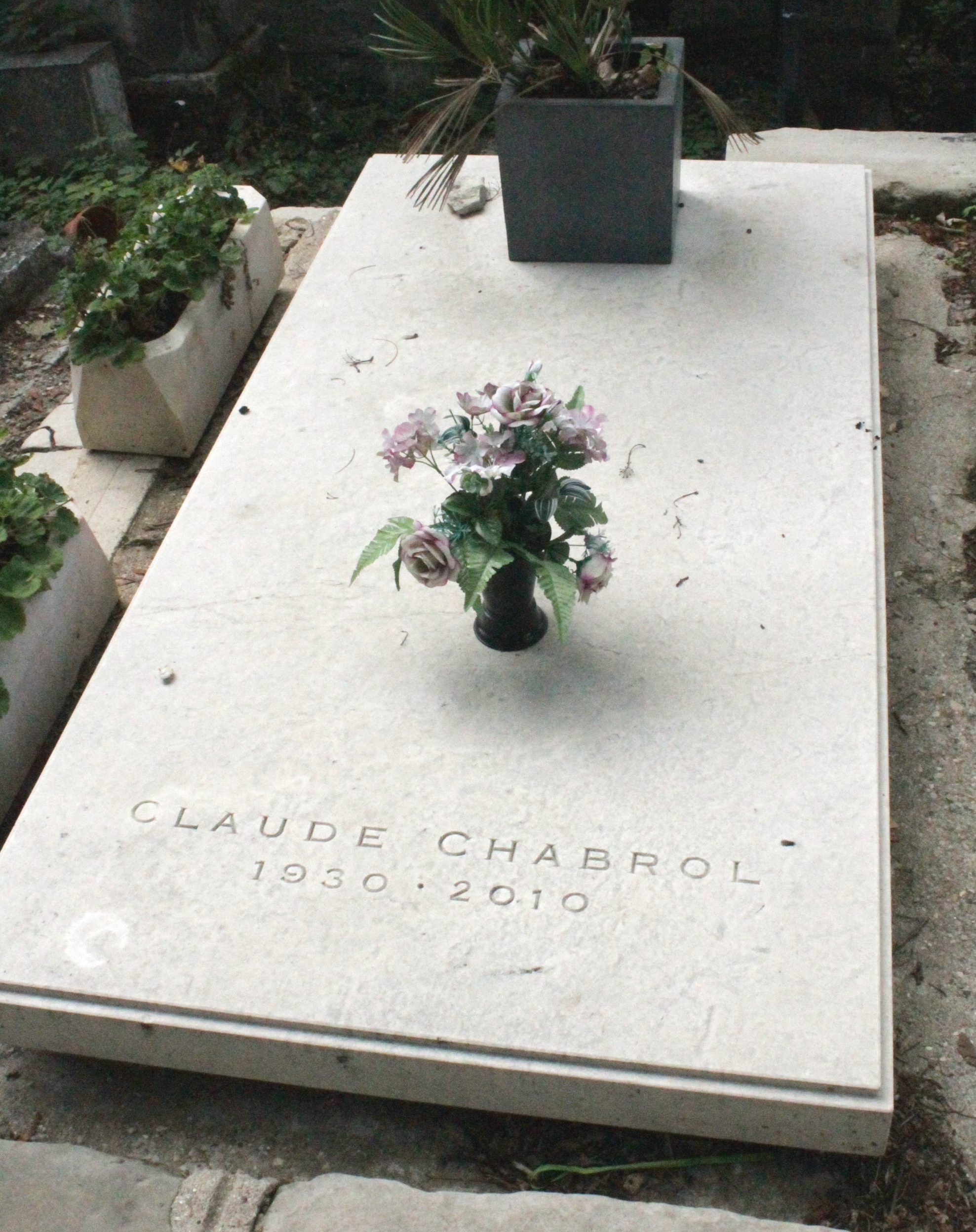
Chabrol' grave at Pere Lachaise Cemetery in Paris

Chabrol's first marriage to Agnès Goute (1956–1962) produced a son, Matthieu Chabrol, a composer who scored most of his father's films from the early 1980s. He divorced Agnès to marry the actress Stéphane Audran, with whom he had a son, actor Thomas Chabrol. They remained married from 1964 to 1978. His third wife was Aurore Paquiss, who has been a script supervisor since the 1950s. He had four children. Chabrol was a known gourmet chef and shot 10 Days Wonder in Alsace only because he wanted to visit its restaurants. Although he acknowledges the influence of Alfred Hitchcock in his work, Chabrol has stated that "others have influenced me more. My three greatest influences were Murnau, the great silent film director...Ernst Lubitsch and Fritz Lang."

Chabrol died on 12 September 2010 of leukemia. He is buried in Père Lachaise Cemetery in north-eastern Paris.

== Filmography ==
=== As director ===
Year	English title	Original title	Notes
1958	Le Beau Serge		Prix Jean Vigo 1959
1959	Les Cousins		Golden Bear
1959	Web of Passion	À double tour	based on The Key to Nicholas Street by Stanley Ellin
1960	Les Bonnes Femmes		
1961	Wise Guys	Les Godelureaux	based on novel of the same title by Éric Ollivier
1962	The Seven Deadly Sins	Les Sept péchés capitaux	Short
1962	The Third Lover	L'Œil du Malin	
1963	Ophélia		loosely based upon Shakespeare's character
1963	Landru		based upon the true story of Henri Désiré Landru
1964	The World's Most Beautiful Swindlers	Les plus belles escroqueries du monde	Short
1964	Le Tigre aime la chair fraiche		
1965	Six in Paris: La Muette	Paris vu par...	Anthology film
1965	Marie-Chantal contre le docteur Kha		loosely based upon Jacques Chazot's character
1965	Our Agent Tiger	Le tigre se parfume à la dynamite	
1966	Line of Demarcation	La Ligne de démarcation	based upon the memoir by Gilbert Renault
1967	The Champagne Murders	Le Scandale	
1967	The Road to Corinth	La route de Corinthe	based on novel of the same title by Claude Rank
1968	Les Biches		loosely based on The Talented Mr. Ripley by Patricia Highsmith
1969	The Unfaithful Wife	La Femme infidèle	
1969	This Man Must Die	Que la bête meure	based on The Beast Must Die by Cecil Day-Lewis
1970	Le Boucher		
1970	The Breach	La Rupture	based on The Balloon Man by Charlotte Armstrong
1971	Just Before Nightfall	Juste avant la nuit	based on The Thin Line by Edward Atiyah
1971	Ten Days' Wonder	La Décade prodigieuse	based on Ten Days' Wonder by Ellery Queen
1972	Dr. Popaul		based on Murder at Leisure by Hubert Monteilhet
1973	Wedding in Blood	Les Noces rouges	
1974	The Nada Gang	Nada	based on Nada by Jean-Patrick Manchette
1975	Pleasure Party	Une partie de plaisir	
1975	Innocents with Dirty Hands	Les innocents aux mains sales	based on The Damned Innocents by Richard Neely
1976	Death Rite	Les Magiciens	based on Initiation au meurtre by Frédéric Dard
1976	The Twist	Folies bourgeoises	
1977	Alice or the Last Escapade	Alice ou la Dernière Fugue	
1978	Blood Relatives	Les Liens de sang	based on Blood Relatives by Ed McBain
1978	Violette Nozière		based upon a true French murder case in 1933
1980	The Horse of Pride	Le Cheval d'orgueil	based upon an autobiography of the same title by Pêr-Jakez Helias
1982	The Hatter's Ghost	Les Fantômes du chapelier	based on novel of the same title by Georges Simenon
1984	The Blood of Others	Le Sang des autres	based on novel of the same title by Simone de Beauvoir
1985	Cop au Vin	Poulet au vinaigre	
1986	Inspecteur Lavardin		
1987	Masks	Masques	
1987	The Cry of the Owl	Le cri du hibou	based on The Cry of the Owl by Patricia Highsmith
1988	Story of Women	Une affaire de femmes	based upon the true story of Marie-Louise Giraud
1990	Quiet Days in Clichy	Jours tranquilles à Clichy	based upon a Quiet Days in Clichy by Henry Miller
1990	Dr. M	Docteur M	loosely based on the plot of Fritz Lang's Dr. Mabuse the Gambler, which was in turn based on Mabuse der Spieler by Norbert Jacques
1991	Madame Bovary		based on Madame Bovary by Gustave Flaubert
1992	Betty		based on novel of the same title by Georges Simenon
1993	The Eye of Vichy	L'Œil de Vichy	Documentary
1994	Hell	L'Enfer	adapted from the screenplay of the same title by Henri-Georges Clouzot
1995	La Cérémonie		based on A Judgement in Stone by Ruth Rendell
1997	The Swindle	Rien ne va plus	
1999	The Color of Lies	Au cœur du mensonge	
2000	Merci pour le chocolat		based on The Chocolate Cobweb by Charlotte Armstrong
2003	The Flower of Evil	La fleur du mal	
2004	The Bridesmaid	La Demoiselle d'honneur	based on The Bridesmaid by Ruth Rendell
2006	Comedy of Power	L'ivresse du pouvoir	
2007	A Girl Cut in Two	La Fille coupée en deux	
2009	Bellamy		Final film

=== As actor ===
- 1956: La Sonate à Kreutzer (by Éric Rohmer)
- 1958: Le Beau Serge (by Claude Chabrol) – La Truffe
- 1959: Web of Passion (by Claude Chabrol) – Passerby (uncredited)
- 1960: Les Bonnes Femmes (by Claude Chabrol) – Un nageur à la piscine (uncredited)
- 1960: Les Jeux de l'amour (by Philippe de Broca) – Le forain
- 1960: Trapped by Fear (by Jacques Dupont) – Invité à la soirée (uncredited)
- 1961: Wise Guys (by Claude Chabrol) – Un consommateur (uncredited)
- 1961: Saint Tropez Blues (by Marcel Moussy) – Le réalisateur empruntant des propos de Pierre Kast
- 1961: Les menteurs (by Edmond T. Gréville) – Le réceptionniste de l'hôtel (uncredited)
- 1961: Paris Belongs to Us (by Jacques Rivette) – Un homme à la party (uncredited)
- 1962: Les Ennemis (by Édouard Molinaro) – Le moniteur de gymnastique (uncredited)
- 1962: The Seven Deadly Sins (by various directors) – Le pharmacien (segment "Avarice, L'") (uncredited)
- 1962: The Third Lover (by Claude Chabrol) – Man in peep show (uncredited)
- 1964: Les durs à cuire ou Comment supprimer son prochain sans perdre l'appétit (by Jacques Pinoteau) – Le psychiatre
- 1965: Six in Paris (by various directors) – The father (segment "La Muette")
- 1965: Marie-Chantal contre le docteur Kha (by Claude Chabrol) – Customer complaining of his fruit juice
- 1965: Our Agent Tiger (by Claude Chabrol) – Le médecin radiologue (uncredited)
- 1966: Brigitte et Brigitte (by Luc Moullet) – Le cousin obsédé de Petite Brigitte
- 1967: La route de Corinthe (by Claude Chabrol) – Alcibiades (uncredited)
- 1968: La Petite Vertu (by Serge Korber) – Le client du club 22 / Man at the bar in the night club (uncredited)
- 1968: Les Biches (by Claude Chabrol) – Filmmaker (uncredited)
- 1970: La Rupture (by Claude Chabrol) – Un passager dans le tramway (uncredited)
- 1970: Sortie de secours (by Roger Kahane)
- 1971: Aussi loin que l'amour (by Frédéric Rossif) – L'homme au poteau (uncredited)
- 1972: Un meurtre est un meurtre (by Étienne Périer) – Le contrôleur des wagons-lits / Railway Guard
- 1974: Le permis de conduire (by Jean Girault) – Le réceptionniste de l'hôtel (uncredited)
- 1974: La Bonne Nouvelle (Short, by André Weinfeld) – Le curé / The Priest
- 1976: Folies bourgeoises (by Claude Chabrol) – Le client chez l'éditeur (uncredited)
- 1977: Animal (by Claude Zidi) – Le metteur en scène
- 1978: Violette Nozière (by Claude Chabrol) – Récitant du commentaire final (uncredited)
- 1981: Les folies d'Élodie (by André Génovès) – Un invité au vernissage
- 1984: Thieves After Dark (by Samuel Fuller) – Louis Crépin dit :Tartuffe
- 1984: Polar (by Jacques Bral) – Théodore Lyssenko
- 1986: Suivez mon regard (by Jean Curtelin) – Le téléphage
- 1986: Je hais les acteurs (by Gérard Krawczyk) – Lieberman
- 1987: Sale destin (by Sylvain Madigan) – Le commissaire
- 1987: Jeux d'artifices (by Virginie Thévenet) – Le père de Jacques
- 1987: L'été en pente douce (by Gérard Krawczyk) – The priest
- 1988: Alouette, je te plumerai (by Pierre Zucca) – Pierre Vergne
- 1992: Sam suffit (by Virginie Thévenet) – M. Denis
- 1997: Rien ne va plus (by Claude Chabrol) – Le croupier (voice, uncredited)
- 1999: The Color of Lies (by Claude Chabrol) – Emmanuel Solar (voice, uncredited)
- 2006: Avida (by Benoît Delépine and Gustave Kervern) – Le zoophile débonnaire
- 2008: Lucifer et moi (by Jean-Jacques Grand-Jouan) – L'homme de la rue
- 2010: Gainsbourg, vie héroïque (by Joann Sfar) – Le Producteur Musique de Gainsbourg
- 2012: Le Jour des corneilles (by Jean-Christophe Dessaint) – Le docteur (voice)
- 2018: The Other Side of the Wind (by Orson Welles) – Himself (final film role) (Filmed between 1970 and 1976)

=== TV work ===
- Histoires insolites (1974), 5 episodes
- Nouvelles de Henry James (1974), 2 episodes – based on stories by Henry James
- Il était un musicien (1978), 3 episodes
- Madame le juge (1978), 1 episode
- "Jeunesse et Spiritualité" Cyprien Katsaris (1979) Official site
- Fantômas (1980), 2 episodes – Remake of Fantômas
- Le système du docteur Goudron et du professeur Plume (1981) – based on The System of Doctor Tarr and Professor Fether by Edgar Allan Poe
- Elective Affinities (1982) – based on Elective Affinities by Johann Wolfgang von Goethe
- M. le maudit (1982, short)
- La danse de mort (1982) – based on The Dance of Death by August Strindberg
- Les dossiers secrets de l'inspecteur Lavardin (1988), 2 episodes
- Les redoutables (2001), 1 episode
- Chez Maupassant (2007), 2 episodes – based on stories by Guy de Maupassant
- Au siècle de Maupassant: Contes et nouvelles du XIXème siècle (2010), 2 episodes
