= Éric Ollivier =

French writer, screenwriter and journalist

- Born: Yves Duparc; 21 November 1926; Lorient
- Died: 30 January 2015 (aged 88); 14th arrondissement of Paris
- Occupations: Writer journalist screenwriter

Éric Ollivier, pseudonym for Yves Duparc, (21 November 1926 – 30 January 2015) was a French writer, screenwriter and journalist, laureate of several French literary awards.

== Biography ==
=== Youth ===
Éric Ollivier's mother (Theresa Marie Ourvouai) was of Irish descent, his father (Arthur Victor Marie Duparc) was a sailor and poet. Orphaned at the age of eight, he was sent from Brittany to Paris at the end of 1940 by his family. He then studied at Lycée Henri-IV and practiced scouting. Having failed his baccalauréat exams, he enrolled at the Institut national des langues et civilisations orientales where he contributed to a dictionary of Amharic. Jean Cocteau, to whom he wrote, gave him a small role in the film Ruy Blas (1948), of which Jean Marais was the star.

=== Secretary to François Mauriac ===
Eric Ollivier became the secretary of writer François Mauriac from October 1946 to Spring of 1948, when he was called up to carry out his military service. He became a journalist for the daily newspaper Le Figaro in 1949, and was sent to report from Libya, Tunisia and Morocco. He was also a war correspondent in Indochina, a senior reporter in India and Africa. He directly experienced, on the spot, the independence of Morocco and Tunisia.

As a novelist, he was awarded the Prix Roger Nimier for J'ai cru trop longtemps aux vacances in 1967 ; the Prix Cazes for Panne sèche in 1976, the Prix Interallié for L'Orphelin de mer... ou les Mémoires de monsieur Non in 1982, the Prix Sainte-Beuve in 1987 for Les livres dans la peau, and the Prix Charles Oulmont in 1993 for Lettre à mon genou. Author of around thirty books, he was also a television producer and worked for the cinema writing scenarios and dialogue.

The Académie Française bestowed on him its Prix Jean Leduc in 1972 for Églantine and its Prix d'Académie in 1986 for all his works.

Éric Ollivier died on 30 January 2015 at Rueil-Malmaison of intestinal cancer.

== Work ==
- 1958: L'Officier de soleil, Éditions Denoël
- 1960: Les Enracinés, Sagittaire
- 1963: La Cohorte, Plon
- 1959: Les Godelureaux, adapted to the cinema (Les Godelureaux) in 1961 by Claude Chabrol, with Jean-Claude Brialy
- 1965: Le Jeune Homme à l'impériale, La Table ronde
- 1967: J'ai cru trop longtemps aux vacances, Denoël, (Prix Roger Nimier)
- 1970: Les Malheurs d'Annie
- 1971: Passe-L'Eau, Denoël
- 1974: Une femme raisonnable, Denoël
- 1976: Panne sèche, Denoël, (Prix Cazes-Brasserie Lipp)
- 1980: Le temps me dure un peu, Denoël
- 1982: L'Orphelin de mer... ou les Mémoires de Monsieur Non, Denoël, (Prix Interallié)
- 1985: L'Arrière-saison
- 1987: Humeurs chroniques
- 1987: Le Faux Pas
- 1987: Les Livres dans la peau
- 1989: Venise, à tous les temps
- 1991: La Loi d'exil, Grasset
- 1984: L'Escalier des heures glissantes, Gallimard
- 1993: Lettre à mon genou
- 1994: Sur les chemins de France, et puis un peu d'ailleurs, Denoël
- 1996: La nature est ma seconde nature, Grasset / Fasquelle
- 1999: À fleur des cœurs, Grasset
- 2000: Ma langue aux chats, Les Belles Lettres, written in collaboration with Bruno Maso
- 2002: De longues vacances, Grasset
- 2005: Un air de fin des temps, Flammarion
- 2013: Avant de partir, Grasset

== Filmography ==
Cinema; screenwriter or dialoguiste

- 1961: Les Godelureaux, film by Claude Chabrol, with Bernadette Lafont, Jean-Claude Brialy and Jean Tissier
- 1963: Dragées au poivre, film by Jacques Baratier, with Guy Bedos, Jean-Paul Belmondo, Francis Blanche and Sophie Daumier
- 1965: The Duke's Gold, film by Jacques Baratier, with Claude Rich, Monique Tarbès and Jacques Dufilho
- 1971: Églantine, film by Jean-Claude Brialy, with Valentine Tessier, Claude Dauphin and Odile Versois

Television

- 1966: Un beau dimanche, Television film by François Villiers, with Jean-Pierre Aumont
