= Nada (1974 film) =

1974 film by Claude Chabrol

- French theatrical release poster
- Directed by: Claude Chabrol
- Screenplay by: Claude Chabrol
- Based on: Nada by Jean-Patrick Manchette
- Produced by: André Génovès
- Starring: Fabio Testi; Maurice Garrel; Mariangela Melato; Michel Duchaussoy
- Cinematography: Jean Rabier
- Edited by: Jacques Gaillard
- Music by: Pierre Jansen
- Production companies: Les Films La Boëtie; Italian International Film
- Distributed by: Les Films La Boëtie (France); Cinema International Corporation (Italy)
- Release date: 1974 (France)
- Running time: 110 minutes
- Countries: France; Italy
- Languages: French; English

Nada (Spanish: Nothing), also titled The Nada Gang in the US, is a 1974 Franco-Italian political thriller film directed by Claude Chabrol, based on the novel of the same name by Jean-Patrick Manchette. It follows an anarchist group which, after kidnapping the United States Ambassador to France, is hunted down by the police, with both sides making use of uninhibited violence.

== Plot ==
The anarchist group "Nada" decides to kidnap the United States Ambassador to France and demand a ransom for his release. Although some group members are reluctant to the plan, teacher Treuffais alone refuses to participate in the venture. During the operation, carried out in a brothel which the Ambassador regularly visits, a police officer and an undercover agent are killed. The Minister of the Interior orders Commissioner Goémond to find the hideout of the group, implying that the death of the hostage could be useful to the state as it would turn the public's opinion against the Left. During the attack on the group's refuge, all members except Diaz are killed, who executes his hostage before he flees. Goémond, who had arrested and violently interrogated Treuffais, waits for Diaz in Treuffais' apartment, convinced that Diaz will show up sooner or later. During the final shootout, both Goémond and Diaz are killed. Treuffais rings up a newspaper, offering to tell the full story of the Nada group.

== Cast ==
The Nada group

- Fabio Testi as Diaz
- Maurice Garrel as Épaulard
- Mariangela Melato as Cash
- Michel Duchaussoy as Treuffais
- Lou Castel as D'Arey

Others

- Michel Aumont as Goémond
- Didier Kaminka as Meyer
- Katia Romanoff as Anna Meyer
- André Falcon as the Minister
- Lyle Joyce as Ambassador Poindexter
- Viviane Romance as Mrs. Gabrielle
- Daniel Lecourtois as the Prefect
- Rudy Lenoir as Mr. Bouillon
- Dominique Zardi as policeman
- Henri Attal as policeman
- François Perrot

== Reception and legacy ==
The initial reaction of French critics towards Nada was reserved. While Jacques Grant of magazine Cinématographe called it a "poor film", Chabrol's former colleagues of Cahiers du Cinéma simply ignored it (as they had already done with Chabrol's three preceding works). Louis Chauvet of Le Figaro considered the scenario weak, but saw a maturation of the director's talent in purely cinematographic terms.

Upon the film's opening in New York on 6 November 1974, The New York Times critic Nora Sayre titled Nada a "muddled yet sometimes rewarding movie" with "impeccable camerawork" and "several good performances", but one that "grasps at clichés" in its portrayal of the Nada group, concluding that Chabrol "has chosen a milieu that's just too alien for him, as the absurdity of the film's conclusion proves". Writing for The Village Voice, Andrew Sarris was even less sympathetic of the film, in which "stylistics prevail over thematics". Although rating it superior to Costa-Gavras' two years earlier State of Siege, Sarris called Nada a "spectacle of joyless unimaginative smugness", being "relentlessly rhethorical" and counselling "a revolutionary patience of Christian duration" when it argues that "terrorism is counterproductive in terms of the desirable end of a revolution".

Contrary to Sayre's and Sarris' opinion, Tom Milne in British magazine Time Out regarded Nada as "one of Chabrol's best films" and a "chillingly cool political thriller", which juxtaposes the "absurd ideological confusions" of the Nada group with an authority which is "even less concerned with human life than the terrorists".

In her 1999 book May 68 in French Fiction and Film: Rethinking Society, Rethinking Representation, Margaret Atack sees Nada as Chabrol's exploration of the "weakness of the bourgeoisie" through the suspense format of the social thriller, which overlaps with film noir in Chabrol's obsession with the "very fine line between good and evil, morality and madness".
