= Les Biches (film) =

1968 romantic tragedy

- Theatrical release poster
- Directed by: Claude Chabrol
- Written by: Claude Chabrol; Paul Gégauff
- Produced by: André Génovès
- Starring: Jean-Louis Trintignant; Jacqueline Sassard; Stéphane Audran
- Cinematography: Jean Rabier
- Edited by: Jacques Gaillard
- Music by: Pierre Jansen
- Release dates: March 22, 1968 (France); August 30, 1968 (Italy)
- Running time: 95 minutes
- Countries: France; Italy
- Language: French
- Box office: 627,679 admissions (France)

Les Biches (English: The Does) is a 1968 drama film directed by Claude Chabrol. It depicts a tortured love triangle between characters portrayed by Stéphane Audran and Jacqueline Sassard; Jean-Louis Trintignant also stars. Audran won the Silver Bear for Best Actress at the 18th Berlin International Film Festival. The film had an audience of 627,164 in France.

While the film does not acknowledge any literary sources, Les Biches is loosely based on Patricia Highsmith's 1955 novel The Talented Mr. Ripley, with the main characters' genders being switched. Chabrol's screenwriter Paul Gégauff had previously adapted the novel into Purple Noon in 1960.

== Plot ==
On the Pont des Arts in Paris, a wealthy and attractive heiress, Frédérique, picks up a penniless female street artist called Why. Frédérique seduces Why and takes her to her villa in Saint Tropez. The villa is occupied by two gay friends of Frédérique, Robegue and Riasis. At a party, Why meets an architect, Paul Thomas. She leaves the party with him. They are followed by Robegue and Riasis, acting on Frédérique's orders. They report back to Frédérique that Why has spent the night with Paul.

Frédérique visits Paul and sets out to seduce him. The two start having an affair. Frédérique invites Paul to move into the villa, kicking out Robegue and Riasis. One morning Why finds a note saying that Paul and Frédérique have gone to Paris. She follows them and goes to Frédérique's apartment. Discovering Frédérique alone, Why confesses to being jealous of both Frédérique and Paul. Frédérique tells Why that she finds her love repulsive, and Why stabs her with a poisoned dagger that was on display in Frédérique's Saint Tropez villa. Why calls Paul, pretending to be Frédérique, and invites him to the apartment. When he arrives Why is waiting for him dressed in Frédérique's clothes.

== Cast ==
- Jean-Louis Trintignant as Paul Thomas
- Jacqueline Sassard as Why
- Stéphane Audran as Frédérique
- Nane Germon as Violetta
- Serge Bento as Bookseller
- Henri Frances
- Henri Attal as Robèque
- Dominique Zardi as Riais

== Production ==
Chabrol later admitted he included the lesbian plot in order to help the film at the box office. It was the first film he made with producer André Génovès.

Chabrol talked about the story:

It is about the equilibrium of such a relationship, when someone else intervenes about the bargains that people make with each other. And about the rich, the advantage that they have over the poor, their richness. They can buy people, and the poor have to submit, until they revolt, and the only possible revolt is destruction. It is from a Marxist point of view but it is not political at all. I'm sure you cannot make a revolution with a camera. But you can show up all the people and things you dislike.

== Release ==
Les Biches was released in France on March 22, 1968 and in Italy on August 30, 1968.

Paris-based Tamasa Distribution is set to release "Première Vague" a collection of blu-ray discs of seven early films by Chabrol. The box set is set for release in France on November 18, 2025. Variety said that it would include films that were "long unavailable" to the public, including Les Biches.

== Reception ==
Les biches was not successful at the box office but it has become one of Chabrol's more famous films. It revived his reputation critically after a series of disappointing films.

Chabrol said later the film marked a creative turning point for him. "With the films since Les Biches I think I'm finally on the right track," he said. "I knew I was interested in murder but what I didn't realise is that my interest isn't in solving puzzles. I want to study the human behaviour of people involved in murder."

On review aggregator website Rotten Tomatoes, the film holds an approval rating of 77% based on 13 reviews, with an average rating of 7.6/10.
