= The Champagne Murders =

1967 French film by Claude Chabrol

- Directed by: Claude Chabrol
- Written by: William Benjamin; Claude Brulé; Derek Prouse; Paul Gégauff
- Produced by: Raymond Eger
- Starring: Maurice Ronet; Anthony Perkins; Yvonne Furneaux; Stéphane Audran
- Cinematography: Jean Rabier
- Edited by: Jacques Gaillard
- Music by: Pierre Jansen
- Color process: Technicolor
- Production company: Universal Pictures
- Distributed by: Universal Pictures
- Release date: 31 March 1967 (France)
- Running time: 106 minutes
- Country: France
- Language: French

The Champagne Murders (French: Le scandale) is a 1967 French crime thriller film directed by Claude Chabrol, based on a story by William Benjamin and starring Maurice Ronet and Anthony Perkins. It was the first of two films that Chabrol made with Perkins.

For his role in the film, Ronet won the Silver Shell for Best Actor at the San Sebastián International Film Festival.

== Plot ==
Paul Wagner leads a disorderly life, drinking and partying too much with his American friend and business partner Christopher Belling. Paul's reputation is eventually compromised when his drunken behavior causes outrage at a high-society evening.

One night, as he takes a prostitute to a park after drinking, Paul is attacked by unknown assailants, who leave him with a serious head injury and strangle her. Unable to manage the family champagne business, it is run for him by Christine, Christopher's wife, and her assistant Jacqueline. Christine tries to take advantage of Paul by selling the company, but he refuses to sign. On a business trip to Hamburg with Christopher, Paul gets drunk and goes to a park with a prostitute, who is found strangled in the morning. Going with Christopher to the party of a promiscuous artist, Paul again gets drunk and she is found strangled in the morning.

Terrified that he may be murdering young women after drinking, Paul seeks the help of Christine while Christopher is away. She takes advantage of Paul by getting him to sign away his rights in the company. He goes home despondent and in the morning Christine is found strangled. Christopher, who now owns the business, turns up with a striking blonde, whom Paul remembers seeing in Hamburg and at the artist's party. The blonde reveals herself as Jacqueline, without the dark wig and pale make-up she wore at work, who is Christopher's mistress and has committed the three murders. A gun is pulled out and the movie camera recedes as the three fight over the gun.

== Cast ==
- Maurice Ronet as Paul Wagner
- Anthony Perkins as Christopher Belling
- Yvonne Furneaux as Christine Belling
- Stéphane Audran as Jacqueline
- Annie Vidal as Blonde
- Henry Jones as Mr. Clarke
- Catherine Sola as Denise
- George Skaff as Mr. Pfeiffer
- Christa Lang as Paula
- Marie-Ange Aniès as Michele
- Suzanne Lloyd as Evelyn
- Henri Attal and Dominique Zardi as thugs

== Production ==
The Champagne Murders was Chabrol's first film with English-speaking actors. He filmed each scene in both English and French; much of the English dialogue was mouthed phonetically by the French actors and later dubbed in English.

The film was shot in Techniscope format.

== Reception ==
In a New York Times review, critic Vincent Canby wrote: "Mr. Chabrol ... has made a film that has the shape and structure of a murder mystery, but which is, essentially, a funny, sardonic social drama."

== Release ==
The film was not released on VHS in the U.S. In February 2018, Umbrella Entertainment released a French-language DVD which contains the 105-minute version. In July 2019, Kino Lorber released both the DVD and Blu-ray versions in the United States and Canada. The Blu-ray version, contains the 98-minute English-language version rather than the 105-minute French-language version, and came with the DTS-HD 2.0 Master Audio and Trailers from Hell featurette.
