= Alice or the Last Escapade =

- Directed by: Claude Chabrol
- Screenplay by: Claude Chabrol
- Based on: Alice's Adventures in Wonderland by Lewis Carroll
- Produced by: Pierre Gauchet; Patrick Hildebrand; Eugène Lépicier
- Starring: Sylvia Kristel; Charles Vanel
- Cinematography: Jean Rabier
- Edited by: Monique Fardoulis
- Music by: Pierre Jansen
- Production companies: Filmel # P.H.P.G.
- Distributed by: Union Générale Cinématographique (UGC)
- Release date: 19 January 1977
- Running time: 93 minutes
- Country: France
- Language: French
- Box office: 98,954 admissions (France)

Alice or the Last Escapade (French: Alice ou la dernière fugue) is a 1977 French fantasy film written and directed by Claude Chabrol. The film is very loosely inspired by the 1865 novel Alice's Adventures in Wonderland by Lewis Carroll, including the protagonist's name being Alice Carroll (a combination of the Alice character and the author's pseudonymous surname).

== Plot ==
While leaving her husband, whom she has grown to despise, Alice (Sylvia Kristel) drives into the pristine countryside. She must stop at an old house, when her windshield has cracked mysteriously. An old man and his butler welcome her at the mansion as if she were expected. The old man insists on her staying overnight. They even offer to have her car repaired in the morning.

Alice is woken up in the middle of the night by a booming noise. The next day the car is there, with a new windshield. But Alice finds herself alone in the deserted house. After enjoying a good breakfast laid out for her, Alice jumps into the car again. She soon realizes that she cannot find the gateway to the country house from whence she came. A tree trunk seems to be in the way.

Reluctantly, Alice returns to the old house. She then tries to walk the way with her suitcase. In her attempt to do so, Alice meets a young man who tells her to accept the fact that there is no way out. Is she in limbo? She has to spend a second night in the mansion. The old man is there again and provides some explanations.

The following day is a bright morning full of birdsong. Once more breakfast is ready for her in the lonely house. She takes the car again and finds the path and the gate to the highway. Is she really out? A few more strange characters come her way. Her windshield cracks again.

== Cast ==
| Actor | Role |
|---|---|
| Sylvia Kristel | Alice Caroll |
| Charles Vanel | Henri Vergennes |
| Jean Carmet | Colas |
| Fernand Ledoux | The old doctor |
| André Dussollier | The young man at the park |
| François Perrot | The 40 year old man |
| Thomas Chabrol | The 13 year old boy |

== Critical reception ==
From TV Guide:

College philosophy-course idea is given a lush photographic treatment by the Hitchcock-influenced Frenchman Chabrol.

From www.devlidead.com:

Chabrol, ranging from expressionism and realism, depicts a parallel dimension in which there is any obvious duality between good and evil present in the sets, characters, narration, lighting... However, even if the fantasy genre, revealing himself completely new in the career of the director, is perfectly controlled, it appears that the film is very "chabrolien", that is to say close to his characters, which, in are concerned, operate in a microcosm in which their different psychological profiles give rise to power relations. Chabrol, who knows human nature, dissects every move of our heroine, and leads inexorably towards the abyss... At present, even though the film tends to go unnoticed in the career of the filmmaker, ALICE OR THE LAST FUGUE remains a work unique, unclassifiable among other treasures chabroliens as exciting as each other. By adapting the tale of Lewis Carroll "French," Chabrol has risen to the challenge of maintaining its fantasy genre film convictions.
