= Le Tigre aime la chair fraiche =

Le Tigre aime la chair fraîche
- Directed by: Claude Chabrol
- Written by: Roger Hanin; Claude Chabrol
- Produced by: Christine Gouze-Rénal
- Starring: Roger Hanin
- Cinematography: Jean Rabier
- Edited by: Jacques Gaillard
- Music by: Pierre Jansen
- Distributed by: Gaumont Distribution
- Release date: 1964
- Running time: 90 minutes
- Country: France
- Language: French

Le Tigre aime la chair fraîche ("The Tiger loves fresh meat"), English title Code Name: Tiger, is a 1964 French Eurospy film directed by Claude Chabrol and starring Roger Hanin as the spy Louis Rapière, code named "The Tiger". The screenplay was written by Chabrol and Hanin. It was an attempt to create a French franchise equal to James Bond, and its female lead, Daniela Bianchi, had the previous year appeared in the James Bond film From Russia with Love. The film had a sequel in 1965, Le tigre se parfume à la dynamite (Our Agent Tiger).

== Plot ==
The French government plans an international arms deal with the help of a Turkish diplomate named Baskine. But a group of terrorists menaces the diplomat. When the government receives intelligence concerning a looming attempt on Baskine's life, they assign Louis Rapière a.k.a. "The Tiger" to guard Baskine and his family. Rapière immediately proves this decision right by scarcely foiling an assassination. Unfortunately more than one group is after Baskine. They are closing in on Baskine independently from each other.

== Cast ==
- Roger Hanin as Louis Rapière a.k.a. 'le Tigre'
- Maria Mauban as Madame Baskine
- Daniela Bianchi as Mehlica Baskine
- Roger Dumas as Duvet
- Antonio Passalia as Coubassi
- Jimmy Karoubi as Jean-Luc
- Roger Rudel as Benita
- Carlo Nell as the assassin in the theatre

== Crew ==
Josée Dayan was the assistant director on the movie.

== Bibliography ==
- Blake, Matt; Deal, David (2004). The Eurospy Guide. Baltimore: Luminary Press. ISBN 1-887664-52-1.
