= Our Agent Tiger =

Le tigre se parfume à la dynamite
- Directed by: Claude Chabrol
- Written by: Roger Hanin; Jean Curtelin
- Starring: Roger Hanin
- Cinematography: Jean Rabier; Mario Bistagne
- Edited by: Jacques Gaillard
- Music by: Jean Wiener
- Distributed by: Gaumont Distribution
- Release date: 1965
- Running time: 122 minutes
- Country: France
- Language: French

Le tigre se parfume à la dynamite (Our Agent Tiger) is a 1965 secret agent spy film directed by Claude Chabrol and starring and written by Roger Hanin as the Tiger. It is a sequel to the 1964 film Le Tigre aime la chair fraiche.

== Plot ==
The Tiger is sent to oversee the excavation of a sunken ship. While busy retrieving the gold treasure inside the vessel, The Tiger is constantly thwarted by international enemies. Among them is an old Nazi named Hans von Wunchendorf who dreams of world domination. He hides behind the codename "The Orchid" and needs the treasure to sustain a worldwide network of exiled former comrades. Once sanified by the gold his organisation plans to realise the endsieg after all.

== Cast ==
- Roger Hanin as Louis Rapière, "le Tigre"
- Margaret Lee as Pamela Mitchum / Patricia Johnson
- Michel Bouquet as Jacques Vermorel
- Micaela Pignatelli as Sarita Sanchez
- Carlos Casaravilla as Ricardo Sanchez
- José Nieto as Pepe Nieto
- José María Caffarel as Colonel Pontarlier
- George Rigaud as Commander Damerec

== Bibliography ==
- Blake, Matt; Deal, David (2004). The Eurospy Guide. Baltimore: Luminary Press. ISBN 1-887664-52-1.
