= André Génovès =

French film producer and director

André Génovès (1941 in Paris – 1 February 2012 in Thoiry) was a French film producer and director.

== Filmography ==
- 1968: Les Biches
- 1969: This Man Must Die
- 1969: The Unfaithful Wife
- 1970: Le Boucher
- 1970: The Breach
- 1971: Just Before Nightfall
- 1973: Wedding in Blood
- 1974: Nada
- 1975: Innocents with Dirty Hands
- 1976: Barocco
- 1976: Mado
- 1976: A Real Young Girl
- 1976: Nea – Ein Mädchen entdeckt die Liebe (Néa)
- 1984: Mesrine
