= Babie Doły, Pomeranian Voivodeship =

Settlement in Pomeranian Voivodeship, Poland

Babie Doły
- Przysiółek
- Location within Poland
- Coordinates: 53°58′24″N 18°20′28″E
- Country: Poland
- Voivodeship: Pomeranian
- County: Starogard
- Gmina: Zblewo
- Time zone: UTC+1 (CET)
  - Summer (DST): UTC+2 (CEST)
- Vehicle registration: GST

Babie Doły [ˈbabjɛ ˈdɔwɨ] is a przysiółek in the administrative district of Gmina Zblewo, within Starogard County, Pomeranian Voivodeship, in northern Poland. It is located in the ethnocultural region of Kociewie in the historic region of Pomerania.

== Babie Doły bunker people legend ==
In 1951, an Associated Press report claimed that a German soldier was found alive after being trapped with five comrades following the dynamiting of their underground storehouse in 1945. They are believed to have been looting the storehouse and the retreating soldiers who dynamited the tunnel did not know they were there. The stores contained a large amount of food, drink, candles and other goods so the soldiers were able to survive. Four of the soldiers died (two suicides soon after being trapped, two unknown causes) leaving only two survivors. One of them suffered a heart attack and died upon leaving the tunnel. The final soldier was said to have made a full recovery, but his identity was never revealed.

However, a 1958 Die Spiegel investigation strongly suggests that the "bunker people of Gdynia" (or the Babie Doły legend) was likely a fabrication rather than a real event. The Polish Interior Ministry stated that they were not aware of any such incident.

The legend gained traction in both East and West Germany primarily through sensationalized tabloids, ballads, novellas and stage dramas. A rhymed version of the tale was a popular radio play of the Nordwestdeutscher Rundfunk radio.

In 1958, the movie Nasser Asphalt (Wet Asphalt), written by former police reporter Will Tremper, presents the bunker story as a fabrication by a journalist seeking sensational news in the tense post-war period.

The story inspired a novel called Le Blockhouse by French author Jean-Paul Clébert which was made into the British film The Blockhouse in 1973.
