= Robert Giraud =

French journalist, poet and lexicographer (1921–1997)

- Born: 21 November 1921; Nantiat (Haute-Vienne) France
- Died: 17 January 1997 (aged 75) January 17, 1997 in Nanterre; Nanterre, France
- Occupations: Journalist, Poet

Robert Giraud (November 21, 1921 – January 17, 1997), was a French journalist, poet and lexicographer. He is the author of over 30 books and subject of the 2009 biography Monsieur Bob by Olivier Bailly.

== Early years ==
Robert Giraud lived his childhood and youth in Limoges. He followed his education in lycée Gay-Lussac and began to study law. He was arrested and imprisoned by the Nazis only to escape the death sentence thanks to the liberation of the city by the forces of Colonel Georges Guingouin.

In 1944 he became editor of the newspaper Unir (Unite), join the French Resistance and went to Paris with the editorial team which included the journalist and future editor René Rougeri.

== Paris ==
In Paris he quickly became a regular at the bar l'Institut run by Mr. Fraysse where be befriended the regulars including Maximilien Vox, the Prévert brothers (Pierre and Jacques Prévert), Albert Vidalie, Maurice Baquet and especially the photographer Robert Doisneau. Giraud works for antiquarian 'Romi' whose shop by the Seine was frequented by Robert Doisneau, who made a series of photos there, and police inspector and future historian Jacques Delarue. He contributed to Franc-Tireur, Paris-Presse, France-Soir and Détective, before he turned to earning a meager living as a book seller alongside other future writers including Michel Ragon before his successful career as a novelist and art critic and the journalists Pierre Mérindol and Jean-Paul Clébert (author of Paris insolite/Unknown Paris).

From the liberation until the mid-1950s Robert Giraud lived a meager material existence but this proved to be a very rewarding time for his work. He visited and befriended many homeless people (or clochards as referred to in French), pimps, prostitutes and eccentric former convicts who inhabited various unknown areas of Paris near Saint-Germain-des-Prés, Place Maubert, the rue Mouffetard or Halles. He brought his friend Robert Doisneau to explore this underworld which led to a beautiful series of portraits of unusual Parisian characters. Giraud immersed himself in the culture of the clochards and was fascinated by everything from the unusual tattoos to unique slang. He famously described them as follows:

The clochard does not work work, he carries out obligations. Everyone has his fiddle, or his "defense" (his way to fend for himself) that he will not give up to anyone else, and he jealously guards the secret. The clochard gets by during the night and often sleeps during the day wherever he is taken by fatigue, on a bench, a ventilation grille, even on the pavement or on the paths along the Seine

— Le Royaume d'Argot p260

From 1943 to 1958 he published five poetry collections, the last with a preface by André Salmon. His first non-poetry book Les Tatouages du milieu appeared in 1950 co-authored with Jacques Delarue. In 1955 he published Le Vin des rues, which won the prix Rabelais and established Girard as a preeminent chronicler and lucid witness of destitute Parisians. This book is a unique work of poetic reportage capturing a perspective on Paris that has disappeared today.

His knowledge of this underworld gave him the opportunity to work with the young director Alain Jessua on his first film Léon la lune (1956) and with the photographer Irving Penn for a series of photos published in Vogue.

The critical success of this book was followed by other stories followed like La Route mauve (1959), La Petite Gamberge (1961) and La Coupure (1966), that further established Giraud as a brilliant specialist in slang and Parian bistro culture. Like Albert Simonin, Auguste Le Breton or Alphonse Boudard he published reference books on slang used by people of the underworld and prostitutes whom he befriended.

== Later life ==
Robert Giraud always lived among the people of Paris. He never wanted to climb the social ladder and always lived freely. He never received a salary of his life. He died surrounded by many friends, but destitute in 1997. He was cremated at the cemetery of Père-Lachaise.

In 2009 Monsieur Bob (Stock, 2009) a biography by Olivier Bailly was published. The photographer and historian Jean-Claude Gautrand described Girard's close relationship with Robert Doisneau, as follows "He's a photographer of Paris by the word, Doisneau is a writer from Paris by the picture."

== Bibliography ==
- Confessions au jardin, Société intellectuelle du Centre, 1943
- Couronne de vent, Les écrits libres, 1945
- Les Tatouages du ″milieu″, la Roulotte, 1950, with 80 tattoo designs by Jacques Delarue.
- Les Tatouages du ″milieu″, l'Oiseau de Minerve, 1999

(Reissue. Jacques Delarue, Robert Giraud; inset with 80 photographs by Robert Doisneau& 80 tattoo designs by Jacques Delarue.)

- Interdit au cœur, Osmose, 195, with preface by André Salmon
- Les Parisiens tels qu'ils sont, Robert Delpire, 1953, texts and commentary by Robert Giraud and Michel Ragon. Photographs by Robert Doisneau
- Le Vin des rues, Denoël, 1955, Prix Rabelais;

(Reissued with photographs by Robert Doisneau, 1983 and without photographs by Stock, Collection Écrivins, preface by Philippe Claudel, 2009)

- L'Enfant chandelier, Rougerie, 1958, with illustrations by Pierre Giraud.
- La Route Mauve, Denoël, 1959
- Bistrots, Photographs by Robert Doisneau, Le Point, 1960, with Gravures sur le zinc, poem by Jacques Prévert
- La Petite Gamberge, Denoël, 1961
- Les Cris de Paris, 1961, with etchings by Lars Bo
- Réservé à la Correspondance, Denoël, 1965
- Le Royaume d'Argot, Denoël, 1965, with photographs by Robert Doisneau
- La Coupure, Denoël, 1966
- Petite Flore Argotique, Halévy, 1968, with drawings by Gilles Sacksick
- Le Royaume secret du Milieu, Planète, 1969
- L'Académie d'Argot, Denoël, 1971, with drawings by Moisan
- L'Argot tel qu'on le parle, Jacques Grancher, 1981
- Carrefour Buci, Le Dilettante, 1987
- Les Lumières du zinc, Le Dilettante, 1988
- Fleurir la ville, 1988 with etchings by Lars Bo
- L'Argot du bistrot, Marval, 1989, illustrated with 31 unpublished photographs by Édouard Boubat, Denise Colomb, François Coumert & Robert Doisneau

(Reissued with no photographs, Collection La Petite Vermillon, preface by Sébastien Lapaque, 2010)

- L'Argot d'Éros, Marval, 1992
- Faune et flore argotiques, Le Dilettante, 1993
- L'argot de la "Série noire", vol. 1, L'argot des traducteurs, Joseph K, st al. «Temps Noir», 1996, with Pierre Ditalia; foreword by Patrick Raynal.
- Paris mon pote, Le Dilettante, May 2008, preface by Olivier Bailly

== Works in English translation ==
- Illustrated Dictionary of Modern Slang: L'Argot Tel Qu'on Le Parle : Dictionnaire Illustre De L'Argot Moderne, French & European Pubns (December 1981)
