= Nahla (film) =

1979 film

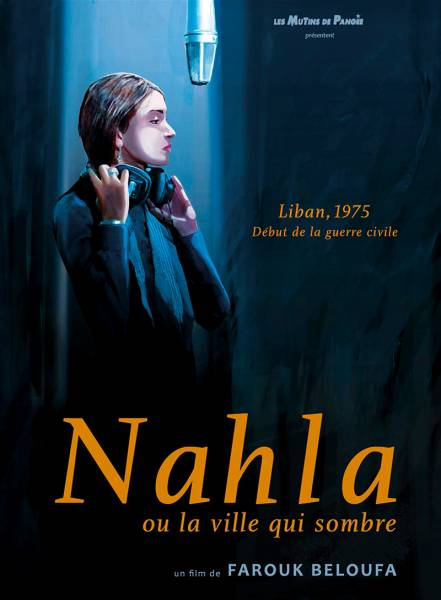
- Poster of the film Nahla
- Directed by: Farouk Beloufa
- Starring: Roger Assaf; Yasmine Khlat
- Cinematography: Allel Yahiaoui
- Release date: August 1979
- Running time: 110 minutes
- Country: Algeria
- Language: Arabic

Nahla is a 1979 Algerian drama film directed by Farouk Beloufa. It was entered into the 11th Moscow International Film Festival where Yasmine Khlat won the award for Best Actress.

== Cast ==
- Roger Assaf as Nasri
- Yasmine Khlat as Nahla
- Lina Tebbara as Maha
- Faek Homaissi as Raouf
- Youcef Saïah as the journalist
