= 11th Moscow International Film Festival =

Film festival

- Location: Moscow, Soviet Union
- Founded: 1959
- Awards: Grand Prix
- Festival date: 14–28 August 1979
- Website: http://www.moscowfilmfestival.ru

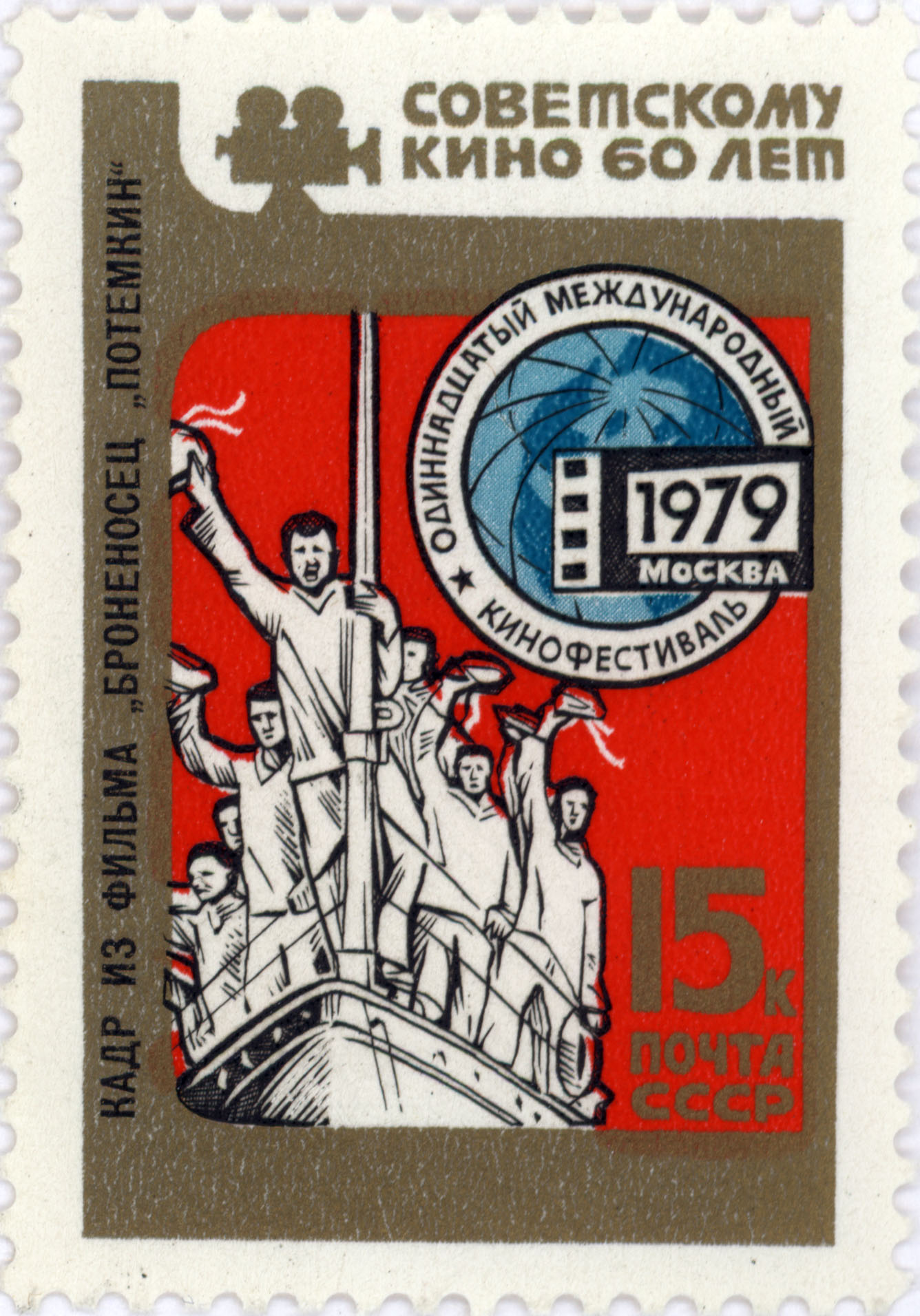
A USSR stamp commemorating the 11th Moscow International Film Festival

The 11th Moscow International Film Festival was held from 14 to 28 August 1979. The Golden Prizes were awarded to the Italian-French film Christ Stopped at Eboli directed by Francesco Rosi, the Spanish film Siete días de enero directed by Juan Antonio Bardem and the Polish film Camera Buff directed by Krzysztof Kieślowski.

== Jury ==
- Stanislav Rostotsky (USSR - President of the Jury)
- Vladimir Baskakov (USSR)
- Otakar Vávra (Czechoslovakia)
- Giuseppe De Santis (Italy)
- Jerzy Kawalerowicz (Poland)
- Raj Kapoor (India)
- Christian-Jaque (France)
- Tom Luddy (USA)
- Margarita Lopez Portillo (Mexico)
- Kurt Maetzig (East Germany)
- Andrei Mikhalkov-Konchalovsky (USSR)
- Tabata Ndiaye (Senegal)
- Emil Petrov (Bulgaria)
- Konstantin Stepankov (USSR)
- Tran Vu (Vietnam)

== Films in competition ==
The following films were selected for the main competition:

English title	Original title	Director(s)	Production country
Anton the Magician	Anton der Zauberer	Günter Reisch	East Germany
The Barrier	Barierata	Christo Christov	Bulgaria
Road Without End	Road Without End	A. Hussein	Bangladesh
Fight for Freedom	Ija ominira	Ola Balogun	Nigeria
The Being	The Being	Tom Ribero	Ghana
Takeoff	Vzlyot	Savva Kulish	Soviet Union
The Children of Sanchez	The Children of Sanchez	Hall Bartlett	United States
Tomorrow Never Comes	Tomorrow Never Comes	Peter Collinson	United Kingdom
In My Life	Honning Måne	Bille August	Denmark
Fish Hawk	Fish Hawk	Donald Shebib	Canada
Dawn!	Dawn!	Ken Hannam	Australia
The Canal	Kanal	Erden Kıral	Turkey
Camera Buff	Amator	Krzysztof Kieślowski	Poland
The Fortress	Az erőd	Miklós Szinetár	Hungary
The Moment	Clipa	Gheorghe Vitanidis	Romania
Mireille and the Others	Mireille dans la vie des autres	Jean-Marie Buchet	Belgium
The Young Man and Moby Dick	Mladý muž a bílá velryba	Jaromil Jireš	Czechoslovakia
Moment	Tren	Stole Janković	Yugoslavia
Nahla	Nahla	Farouk Beloufa	Algeria
Sky Became Clear	Sky Became Clear	Ravjagiin Dorjpalam	Mongolia
Parashuram	Parashuram	Mrinal Sen	India
Travelling Companion	Compañero de viaje	Clemente de la Cerda	Venezuela, Spain
The Tailor from Ulm	Der Schneider von Ulm	Edgar Reitz	West Germany
Portrait of Teresa	Retrato de Teresa	Pastor Vega	Cuba
Poet and Muse	Runoilija ja muusa	Jaakko Pakkasvirta	Finland
Damn for Those Who Cry (Athar's Syllabus)	Jong-e Athar	Mohamad Ali Najafi	Iran
Broken Flag	Bandera rota	Gabriel Retes	Mexico
Seven Days in January	Siete días de enero	Juan Antonio Bardem	Spain, France
My Love is Sweet	Habibati ya hab al-tout	Marvan Haddad	Syria
The Dogs	Les Chiens	Alain Jessua	France
The Walls	Al-asuar	Mohamed Shukri Jameel	Iraq
The Walls of Freedom	Frihetens murar	Marianne Ahrne	Sweden
Only Ahead	Only Ahead	Long Van	Vietnam
Christ Stopped at Eboli	Cristo si è fermato a Eboli	Francesco Rosi	Italy, France

== Awards ==
- Golden Prizes:
  - Christ Stopped at Eboli by Francesco Rosi
  - Siete días de enero by Juan Antonio Bardem
  - Camera Buff by Krzysztof Kieślowski
- Honorable Golden Prize: ¡Que viva México! by Sergei Eisenstein
- Silver Prizes:
  - The Barrier by Christo Christov
  - Parashuram by Mrinal Sen
  - Takeoff by Savva Kulish
- Prizes:
  - Best Actor: Ulrich Thein for Anton the Magician
  - Best Actor: Bata Živojinović for Moment
  - Best Actress: Yasmine Khlat for Nahla
  - Best Actress: Daisy Granados for Portrait of Teresa
- Special Diploma: Only Ahead by Long Van
- Prix FIPRESCI: Camera Buff by Krzysztof Kieślowski
- Honorable Prizes (for the contribution to the cinema):
  - Antonín Brousil
  - Luis Buñuel
  - King Vidor
  - Cesare Zavattini
  - Zoltán Fábri
  - Jerzy Kawalerowicz
  - René Clair
  - Akira Kurosawa
  - Satyajit Ray
  - Ousmane Sembène
  - Andrew Thorndike
  - Annelie Thorndike
