= Léon la lune =

- Directed by: Alain Jessua
- Written by: Robert Giraud and Alain Jessua
- Produced by: A.J. Films
- Starring: Léon la Lune
- Cinematography: Wladimir Ivanov
- Music by: Henri Crolla and André Hodeir
- Release date: 1956
- Running time: 16 minutes
- Country: France
- Language: French

Léon la lune (English: Leon the Moon) is a 1956 French short documentary film directed by Alain Jessua. The film won the Prix Jean Vigo in 1957. The film documents an old drifter in Paris in the poetic realist style.

Jessua was inspired by Jean-Paul Clébert's book Paris Insolite (1952) and decided to make a film about a clochard or tramp. The poet and novelist Robert Giraud, an expert on the Parisian underworld, introduced Jessua to Léon la Lune, a vagrant whose real name was Leon Boudeville, and suggested that they follow him from day to night. After completing the film Giraud showed it to the poet and screenwriter Jacques Prévert who wrote an introduction and asked Henri Crolla to contribute some music to the film.

Léon la lune also appeared in the series Clochards by Robert Doisneau, the pioneer of humanist photojournalism.

== Cast ==
- Léon la Lune aka Leon Boudeville

== See also ==
- Poetic realism
