= Paul Gégauff =

French screenwriter (1922–1983)

- Born: 10 August 1922; Blotzheim, Haut-Rhin, Alsace, France
- Died: 24 December 1983 (aged 61); Gjøvik, Norway
- Occupation: Screenwriter
- Years active: 1950–1983
- Spouse(s): Danièle Gégauff (divorced); Coco Ducados (?–1983, his death)

Paul Gégauff (10 August 1922 – 24 December 1983) was a French screenwriter. He collaborated with director Claude Chabrol on 14 films. His screenplays include Plein Soleil, for which he and director René Clement received an Edgar Award from the Mystery Writers of America, Les Biches, This Man Must Die, and the autobiographical Une partie de plaisir, in which he also played the starring role.

Chabrol once said of Gégauff: "When I want cruelty, I go off and look for Gégauff. Paul is very good at gingering things up...He can make a character look absolutely ridiculous and hateful in two seconds flat."

== Personal life ==
His first marriage to actress Danièle Gégauff ended in divorce. They had a daughter, actress and singer Clémence Gégauff.

Paul Gégauff was fatally stabbed on Christmas Eve in 1983 by his second wife, Coco Ducados, with whom he had a stormy relationship. His final words to her were: 'Kill me if you want, but stop bothering me.'"

== Filmography ==
- Journal d'un scélérat (1950)
- Le Signe du lion (1959)
- Les Cousins (1959)
- À double tour (1959) (writer)
- Plein soleil (1960)
- Les Bonnes Femmes (1960)
- Les Godelureaux (1961)
- L'oeil du malin (1962)
- Ophélia (1963)
- Les grands chemins (1963)
- Le gros coup (1964)
- Les plus belles escroqueries du monde (1964)
- L'autre femme (1964)
- Le Reflux (1965) (also directed)
- Le Scandale (1967)
- Diaboliquement vôtre (1967)
- Les Biches (1968)
- Delphine (1969)
- La femme écarlate (1969)
- More (1969)
- This Man Must Die (1969)
- Qui? (1970)
- Les Novices (1970)
- Ten Days' Wonder (1971)
- La Vallée (1972)
- Dr. Popaul (1972)
- La Rivale (1974)
- Une partie de plaisir (1975)
- Les Magiciens (1976)
- Brigade mondaine: La secte de Marrakech (1979)
- Historien om en moder (1979)
- Pigen fra havet (1980)
- Neon (1981)
- Le système du docteur Goudron et du professeur Plume (1981)
- Les folies d'Élodie (1981)
- Frankenstein 90 (1984)
- Ave Maria (1984)
- Oriana (1985)
