= Nancy Holloway =

American singer and actress (1932–2019)

- Born: Nancy Brown; December 11, 1932; Cleveland, Ohio, United States
- Died: August 28, 2019 (aged 86) Paris, France
- Genres: Pop, yé-yé, jazz, soul
- Occupations: Singer, actress
- Years active: 1959–2008

Nancy Holloway (née Brown; December 11, 1932 – August 28, 2019) was an American jazz, pop and soul singer and actress who was popular during the 1960s in France, where she continued to perform and live.

== Biography ==
Born in Cleveland, Ohio, one of ten children of African American heritage, Nancy Brown attended East Technical High School and married when in her teens. The marriage was brief, but she retained her husband's surname of Holloway. She moved to New York City and took menial jobs before working as a dancer as part of the Beige Beauties troupe. In 1954, she traveled to Paris, France, and was persuaded to sing on stage at the Mars Club. Her performance was well received, and she became a regular performer, touring around Europe before returning to Paris. She began singing at the Moulin Rouge nightclub in 1959.

Encouraged by actor André Pousse, she made her debut appearance on French television in 1961 and released her first single, "Le Boogie du bébé" (a French cover of Buzz Clifford's "Baby Sittin' Boogie"). That year she opened her own nightclub, Chez Nancy Holloway, and appeared in her first film, Ballade pour un voyou. She became successful as a yé-yé style pop singer, uniquely attractive in France as "an American singer singing American songs specifically for the French market... with a distinctly American accent [that] only added to her charm." Further successful singles followed through the early and mid-1960s, including "Quand un garçon me plaît" (based on "Big Noise from Winnetka"), "Dernier baiser" (a version of "Sealed with a Kiss"), "Dum dum", "T'en vas pas comme ça" (an adaptation of "Don't Make Me Over"), "Fich’ le camp Jack" (a version of "Hit the Road Jack"), "Bye Bye" ("My Guy"), "Elle t’aime" ("She Loves You"), "Est-ce que tu m’aimes" ("Do You Love Me"), and "Dis-lui que je ne suis pas là", a duet with Nino Ferrer.

She appeared in several films in the early 1960s, including Le bluffeur, Cherchez l'idole, and Le gentleman de Cocody, and for a time her acting work overshadowed her singing career though she continued to record. She became a respected nightclub performer and appeared with such stars as Sammy Davis Jr., Quincy Jones, and Dizzy Gillespie. In 1969, her album Hello Dolly marked a shift towards show tunes. The death of her daughter led to a period of retirement, but she returned as a concert performer in the 1980s.

In later life she became an active supporter of AIDS charities. She retired from performing in 2008, and died in Paris in 2019, aged 86.

== Selected discography ==
=== Singles and EPs ===
- "T'en va pas comme ça" / "Tu n’es pas venu" – single, 1963, Decca 70 917 (France)

=== LPs ===
- Nancy Holloway, 1963, Ricordi 30 RS 061 (France)
- Nancy Holloway (also known by the title Bye Bye), 1964, Decca 154 073 (France)
- Hello Dolly, 1969, Concert Hall, SVS 2690 (France)
- Nancy Holloway, 1976, Les Tréteaux, 6346 (France)
- Greatest Hits, 1982, Polydor 827 649 1 (France)
- Boppin' Goldies, 1982, Vogue, 015502 (Belgium)

== TV and films ==
- Ballade pour un voyou, directed by Claude-Jean Bonnardot (1963)
- Le Bluffeur directed by Sergio Gobbi (1964)
- Cherchez l'idole, directed by Michel Boisrond (1964)
- The Man from Cocody, directed by Christian-Jaque (1965)
- Corsaires et Flibustiers, directed by Claude Barma (1966)
- Jeu de massacre, directed by Alain Jessua (1967)
- Les Enfants de Caïn, directed by René Jolivet (1970)
- Le Cri du cormoran le soir au-dessus des jonques, directed by Michel Audiard (1970)
- Boulevard du rhum, directed by Robert Enrico (1971)
