= De Spiegeleer =

De Spiegeleer is a surname, occurring primarily in Belgium. Notable people with the surname include:

- Chantal De Spiegeleer (1957–2025), Belgian comic book author and artist
- Pieter De Spiegeleer (born 1981), Belgian politician
