= Oppède =

- Commune
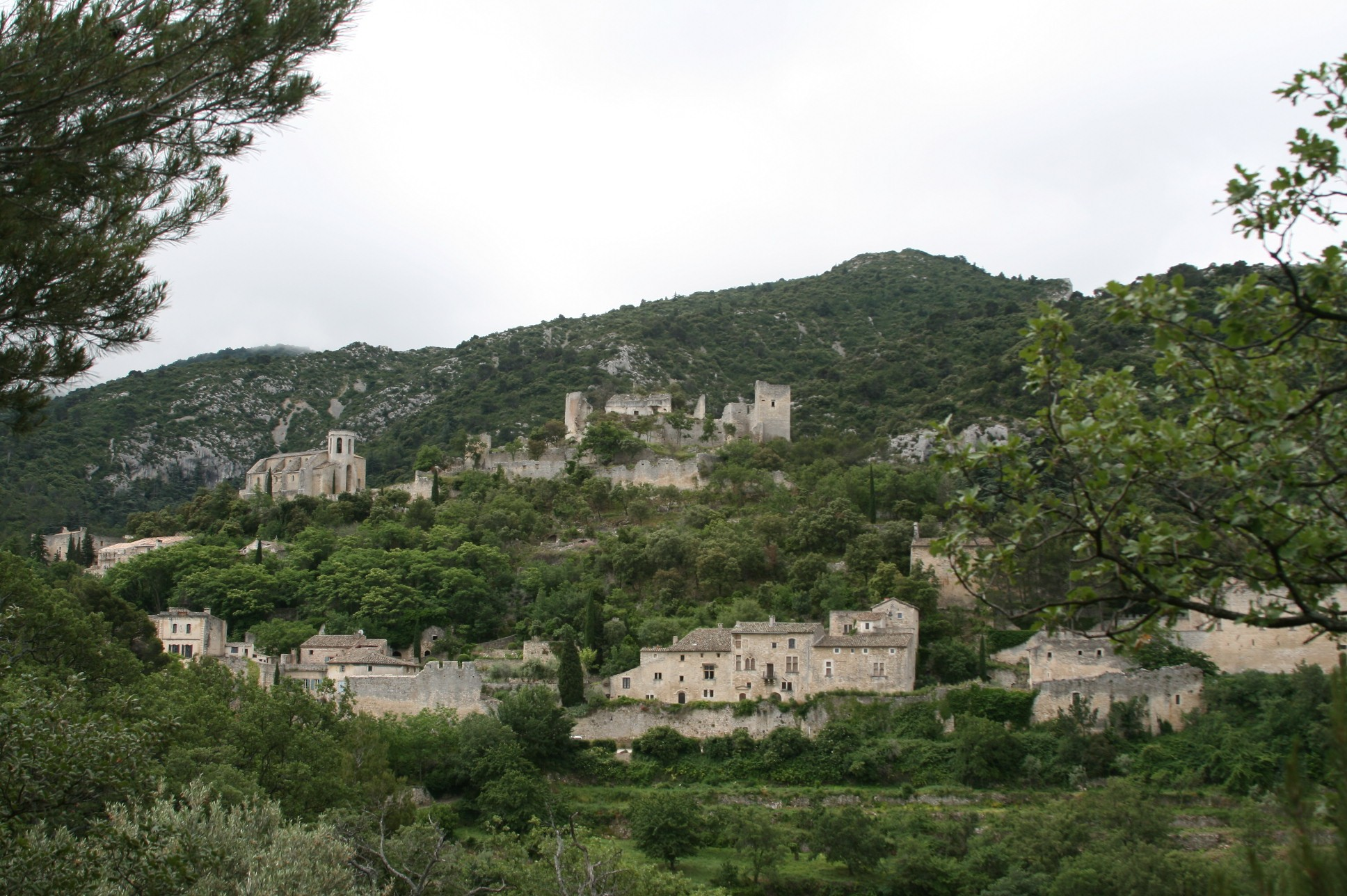
- Oppède-le-Vieux

- Coat of arms
- Location of Oppède
- Location within France Location within Provence-Alpes-Côte d'Azur
- Coordinates: 43°50′43″N 5°10′10″E
- Country: France
- Region: Provence-Alpes-Côte d'Azur
- Department: Vaucluse
- Arrondissement: Apt
- Canton: Apt
- Intercommunality: CA Luberon Monts de Vaucluse

Government
  - Mayor (2021–2026): Jean Pierre Gerault
- Area^{1}: 24.1 km^{2} (9.3 sq mi)
- Elevation: 300 m (980 ft)
- Highest elevation: 733 m (2,405 ft)
- Lowest elevation: 103 m (338 ft)
- Population (2023): 1,285
  - Density: 53.3/km^{2} (138/sq mi)
- Time zone: UTC+01:00 (CET)
  - Summer (DST): UTC+02:00 (CEST)
- INSEE/Postal code: 84086 /84580
- ^{1} French Land Register data, which excludes lakes, ponds, glaciers > 1 km^{2} (0.386 sq mi or 247 acres) and river estuaries.

Oppède (French pronunciation: [ɔpɛd]; Occitan: Opeda) is a commune in the Vaucluse department in the Provence-Alpes-Côte d'Azur region in southeastern France. Oppidum is the Latin word for 'fortified town'.

== History ==
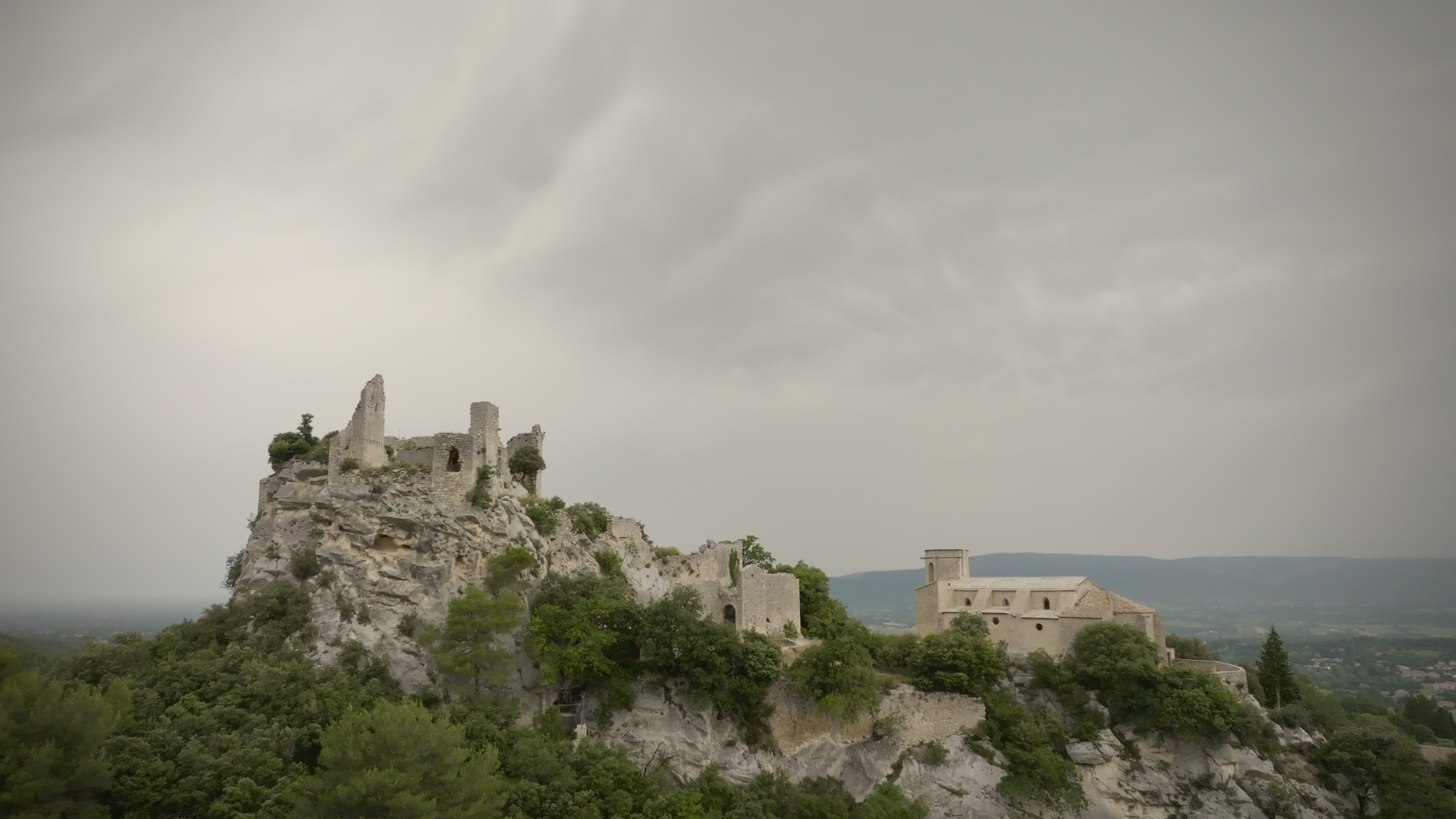
Oppède le Vieux as seen from the northern flank of the Luberon mountains in June 2023.

It is in fact two villages: Oppède-le-Vieux ("the old" in French), built against the Petit Luberon and dating back to the 12th century, and Oppède-les-Poulivets ("nice view" in Provençal), today known as "le village", down in the valley.

The old village, built on a rocky hill, has narrow streets. In winter, the Petit Luberon starts casting its shadow early in the afternoon. Houses beyond the medieval ramparts are dark, humid and tricky to maintain.

From below the village is dominated by the restored church of Notre-Dame-Dalidon and the ruins of the castle.

In the 19th century, the inhabitants had enough and started to move down in the valley, dismantling the roof of their houses to stop paying property taxes.

By the beginning of the 20th century, Oppède-le-Vieux was a ghost village and a new community was officially established in the valley, with larger streets, cosier houses and farmers closer to their fields.

Following the armistice of June 1940, architect Bernard Zehrfuss founded a commune of artists in the old town, a project that attracted French sculptor François Stahly and the writer and artist Consuelo de Saint-Exupéry. The commune proved short-lived. It was the basis for Saint-Exupéry's fictionalized account, published in 1946, called "Kingdom of the Rocks".

== Geography ==
The commune is traversed by the river Calavon.

== Personalities ==
- Consuelo de Saint-Exupéry
- Ridley Scott
- Jean-Paul Clébert
- Alexey Brodovitch

== See also ==
- Communes of the Vaucluse department
