= Jemappes =

Sub-municipality of the city of Mons, Belgium

Jemappes Djumape (Walloon) Djumappes (Picard)
- Sub-municipality of Mons
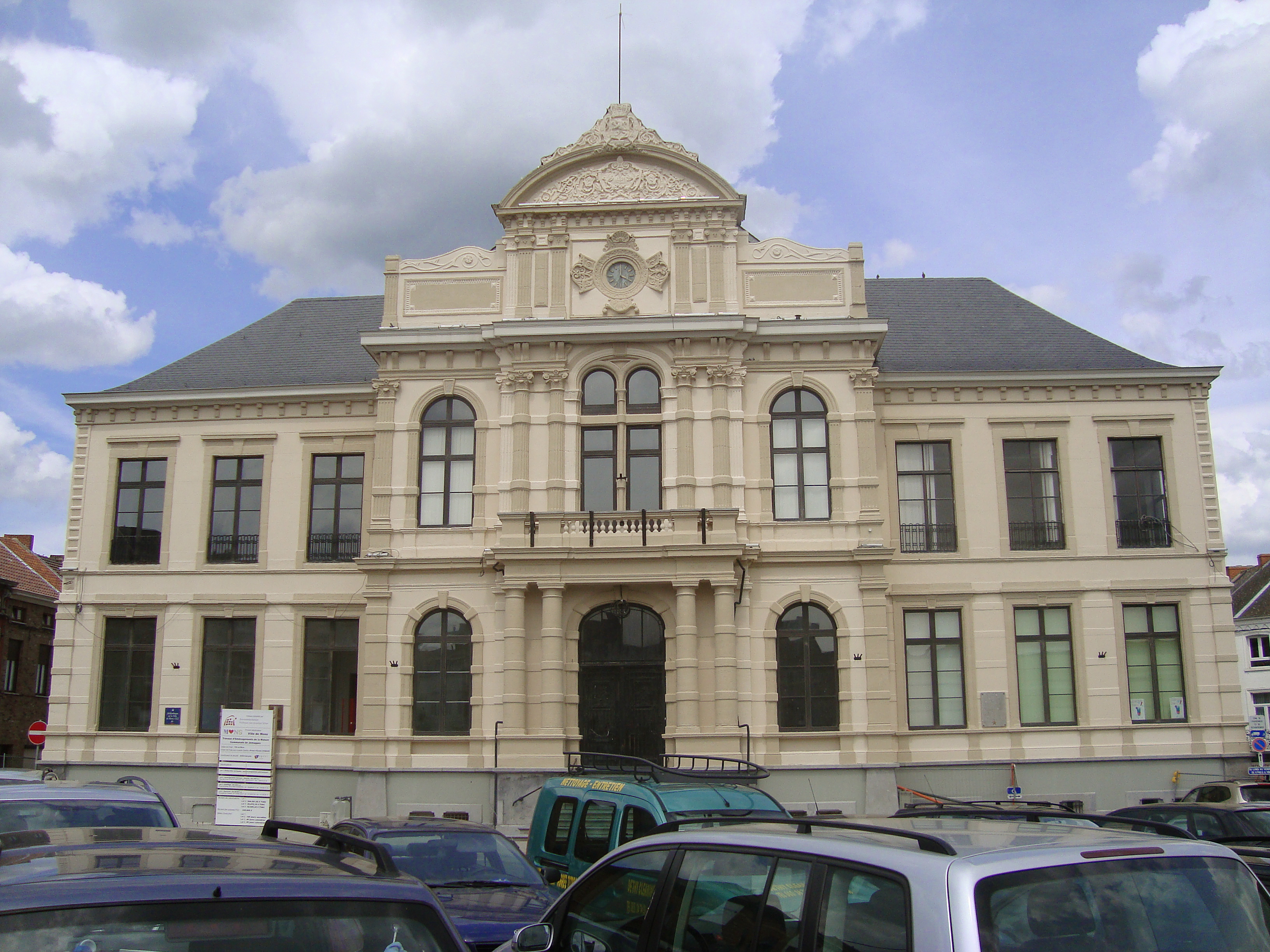
- Old Town Hall

- Flag Coat of arms

- Location of Jemappes in Mons
- Interactive map of Jemappes
- Location within Belgium Location within Hainaut (Belgium)
- Coordinates: 50°26′54″N 3°53′22″E
- Country: Belgium
- Community: French Community
- Region: Wallonia
- Province: Hainaut
- Arrondissement: Mons
- Municipality: Mons

Area
  - Total: 6.72 km^{2} (2.59 sq mi)

Population (2020-01-01)
  - Total: 10,850
  - Density: 1,610/km^{2} (4,180/sq mi)
- Postal codes: 7012
- Area codes: 065

Jemappes (French pronunciation: [ʒəmap]; in older texts also: Jemmapes; Walloon: Djumape; Picard: Djumappes) is a sub-municipality of the city of Mons located in the province of Hainaut, Wallonia, Belgium. It was a separate municipality until 1977. On 8 June 1870, Flénu was detached from Jemappes, and was later merged into Jemappes in 1971. On 1 January 1977, Jemappes was merged into Mons.

Jemappes is known for the Battle of Jemappes between the French and Austrian armies in 1792.

During the French occupation of Belgium (1792–1814), there was a département named after the Battle of Jemappes, Jemmape. Jemappes was also a battleground in the First World War.

== Notable inhabitants ==
- Salvatore Adamo, singer, lived here 1948 - ?
- Jean-Marie Buchet, author-filmmaker born on 24 February 1938.
- Georges Emile Lebacq, painter born on 26 September 1876.
- Ernest Omer, born in Jemappes, Resistance fighter against national socialism (1913–1942).
- Gérard Roland, noted Economist, born in 1954.

== Gallery ==
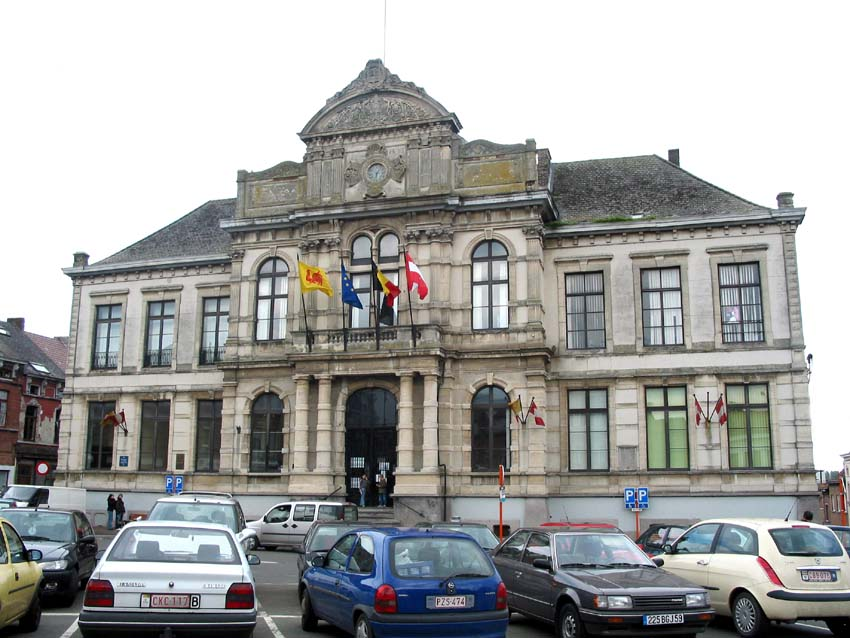
Old Town Hall.

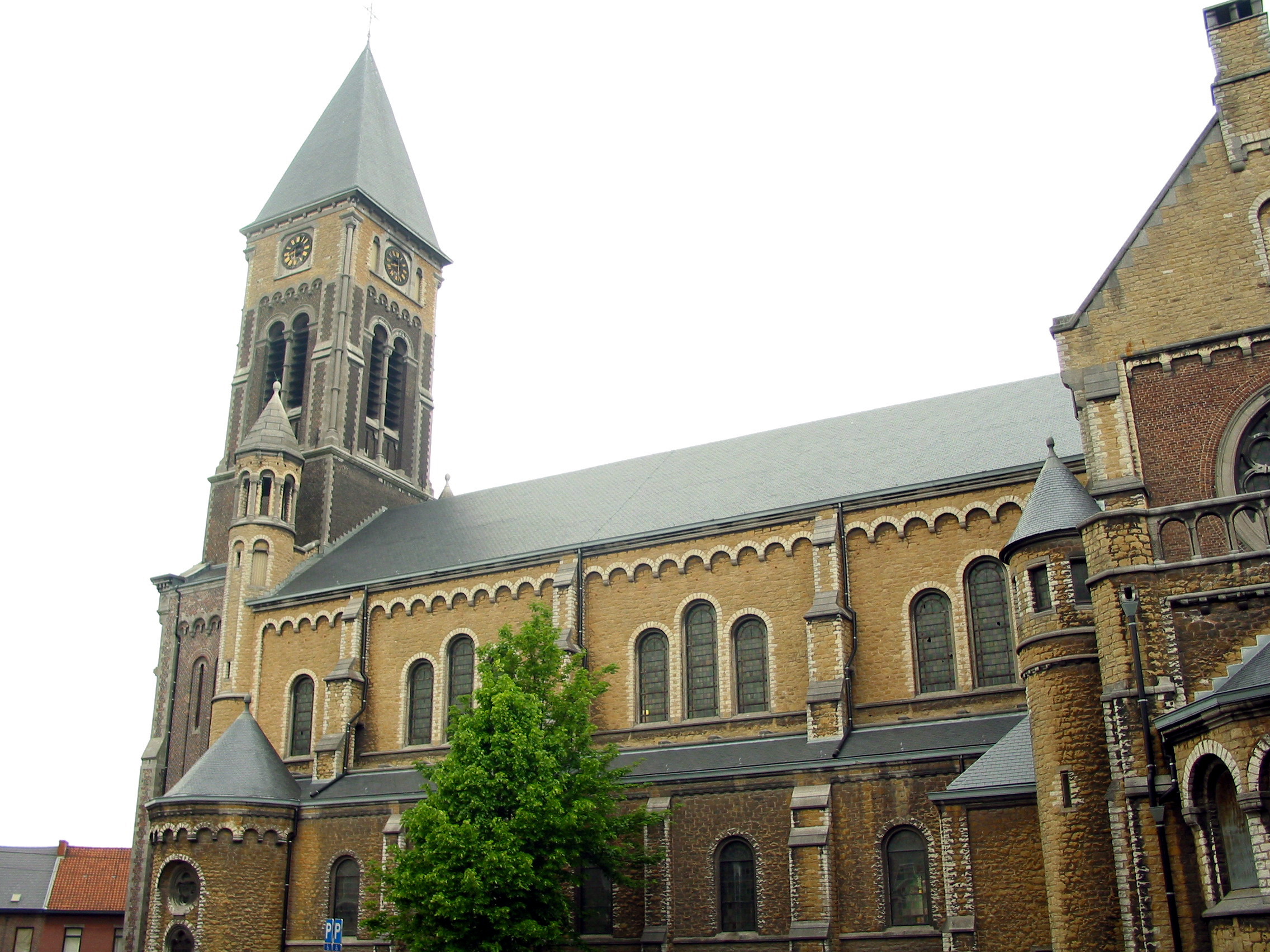
St. Martin Church

== See also ==
- History of Belgium
