= Cherchez l'idole =

1964 film

- Directed by: Michel Boisrond
- Written by: Annette Wademant; Richard Balducci
- Music by: Georges Garvarentz
- Production companies: France Cinéma Productions; Mannic Films; Sirius Films; UGC; Adelphia Compagnia
- Release date: 24 February 1964 (France)
- Running time: 85 minutes
- Countries: France; Italy
- Language: French

Cherchez l'idole (Italian title: Sciarada alla francese, English title: The Chase) is a 1964 French-Italian film directed by Michel Boisrond. Enjoying great success in Japan, notably with the interpretation of Sylvie Vartan and her single La Plus Belle pour aller danser composed for the film and sold millions of copies, the film is considered the instigator of the fashion for Japanese idols and has had a strong impact on the Japanese recording industry as well as Japanese culture in general.

== Plot ==
The great film star Mylène Demongeot moves into a new and beautiful home next to the Bois de Boulogne. His house under construction is invaded by an army of workers. Mylène is invited by General De Gaulle to attend a reception in 3 days which will take place at the Elysée Palace. She asks her maid Gisèle to prepare her gala outfit for that day and to take care of the little diamond heart that she would like to wear on this occasion (a trifle of 500,000 new francs, or some 760,000 euros). In the meantime, she has to leave to go to Cannes for a cinematographic event. Richard, a nice tiler working in the star's house, exasperated by Corinne, his ambitious and troublesome girlfriend, incidentally learned of the existence of the famous jewel from Gisèle... At nightfall, he steals the little heart, but neighbors, having seen him crossing the wall of Mylène's property, alert the police. Pursued by the police, Richard takes refuge in the nearest warehouse, that of a music store, and hides the jewel by sticking it with chewing gum inside an Ericson electric guitar. The next day, when tough Corinne goes to the store to buy the guitar, the five Ericson copies in stock have just been sold to five singing idols. Corinne blames Richard for this blunder and breaks up with him. She sets out on the trail of idols with her friend Vonny while Richard, repentant, also goes on a treasure hunt, but with the help of Gisèle, who knows that he is the thief, in order to return the jewel to Mylène upon her return from Cannes. They will have to approach the idols during their artistic performances to find the one among the five who holds the famous treasure guitar: is it Charles Aznavour, Sylvie Vartan, Frank Alamo, Nancy Holloway or Johnny Hallyday?

== Cast ==
- Dany Saval as Corinne
- Franck Fernandel as Richard
- Dominique Boschero as Vonny
- Christian Marin as Marcel
- Pierre Doris as The disk seller
- Jacques Dynam as The driver
- Franco Califano as The director

As themselves,

- Pierre Bellemare
- Harold Kay
- Claude Piéplu
- Sylvie Vartan
- Eddy Mitchell
- Les Chaussettes Noires
- Nancy Holloway
- Frank Alamo
- Jean-Jacques Debout
- Mylène Demongeot
- Charles Aznavour
- Johnny Hallyday
