= Frankenstein 90 =

- Directed by: Alain Jessua
- Screenplay by: Alain Jessua; Paul Gégauff
- Produced by: Alain Jessua
- Starring: Jean Rochefort; Eddy Mitchell
- Cinematography: William Lubtchansky
- Edited by: Hélène Plemiannikov
- Music by: Armando Trovajoli
- Production companies: A.J. Films; TF1 Films Production
- Distributed by: AMLF
- Release date: 1984
- Country: France
- Language: French

Frankenstein 90 is a 1984 French comedy film directed, produced and written by Alain Jessua. The film stars Jean Rochefort and Eddy Mitchell.

== Release ==
The film was released in France on VHS in 1995.

== Reception ==
Variety stated that Alain Jessua and Paul Gégauff "manages some facile but amiable comic situations" but that "Jessua gropes unsuccessfully for the right macabre-satiric tone." The review stated that Eddy Mitchell was "an inveterate film buff" and "no doubt had fun with the part," but that "Rochefort and other players seem less at ease." AllMovie gave the film one and a half stars out of five, calling it an "uneven spoof".
