= Jean-Marie Buchet =

Belgian author, filmmaker

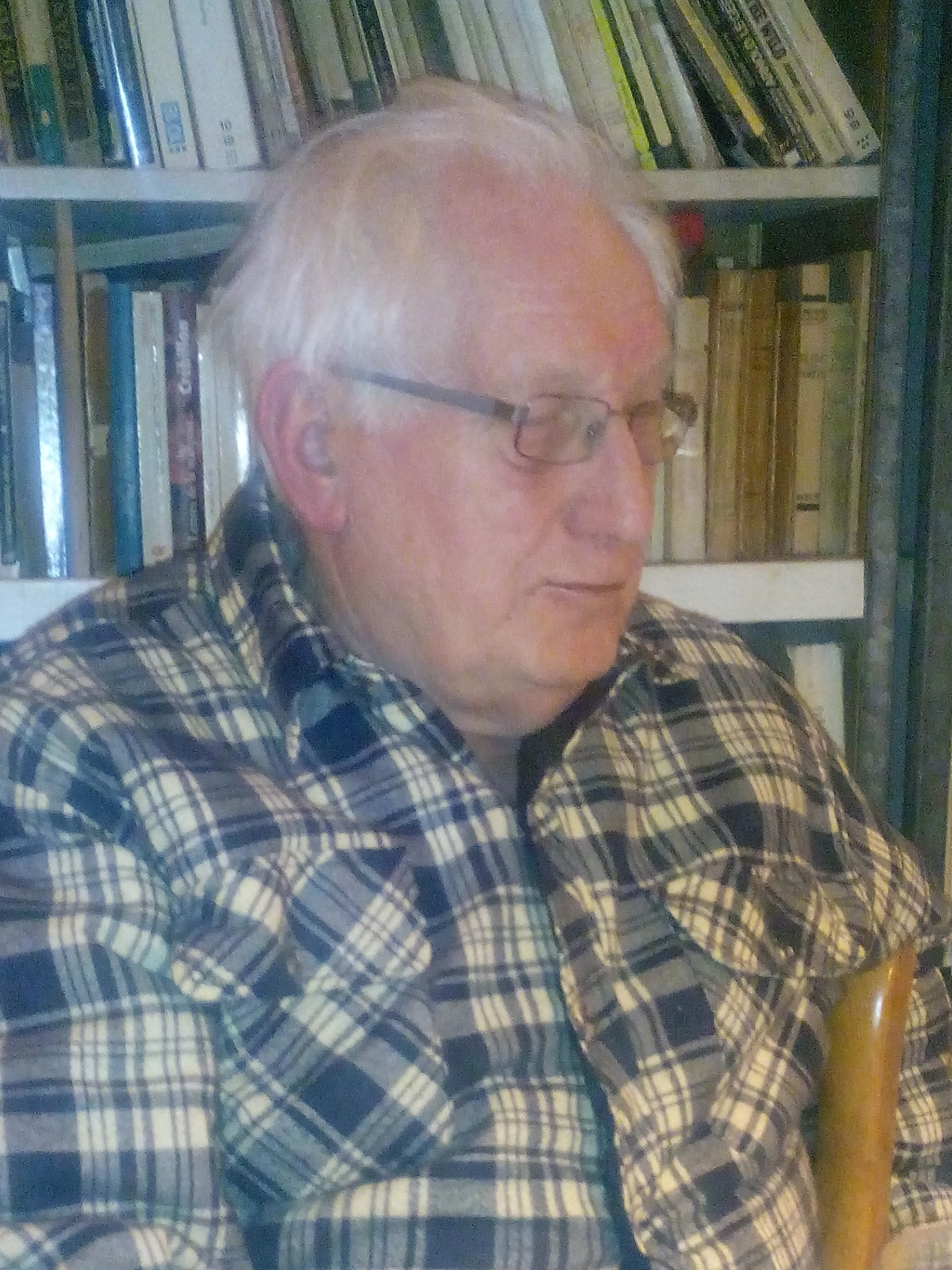
- Born: 24 February 1938 (age 88); Jemappes, Belgium
- Occupations: author and filmmaker

Jean-Marie Buchet (born 24 February 1938 in Jemappes, Belgium, near Mons) is a Belgian author and filmmaker.

== Early life and education ==
At the age of twelve, after failing an examination, Buchet said to a school-fellow "Later I will make cinema!". At nineteen, he entered the first class of cinema of La Cambre at Institut Supérieur des Arts Décoratifs (ISAD) an art school created by Henry Van de Velde. From that class, he holds an unforgettable memory (no budget, no equipment). Buchet entered the section of experimental cinema that La Cambre created in 1957. While there, he mainly studied sound editing and made 3 short films: "Discours" (Speech), "Comment se pendre" (How to hang himself), "that it will wire for sound" in 1974, and "Masques" in 1959, which he made in collaboration with Marc Lobet on a music of Fernand Schirren.

== Career ==
After having worked at Meuter-Titra laboratories, he worked with the cameraman Willy Kurant. In 1963, he made the short film, "La journée de Monsieur Chose" The day of Mr Chose [Thing] and the following year, "Que peut-on bien faire chez soi le dimanche après-midi quand on n'a pas la télévision?" What can we do on a Sunday afternoon, when we don't have a TV?. Five years later, he made "Hommage à Don" Helder Camara. In 1974, he directed Suzanne's Fugue, his first full-length film, which had a limited budget of 200.000 FB or US$5,000. Five years later, with Mireille and the others, he worked on a full-length film turned during six weeks, in studio, produced by Godfroid Courtmans. This was a film of humor, on the razor's edge, neighbors absurdity, in the vein of Czech films of the 1960s. Selected in San Remo and Moscow, the film attains limited public success. After the film "Poveri ma belli" from Dino Risi, Buchet launched Pauvres mais Beaux, a production house, and returned to the short film and documentary, Les meilleurs in 1982 and Dupont Durand in 1989. During his later years, he wrote and directed some shorts. He now works on "Passions froides" a full-length film which he does not despair to carry out, in spite of resistance from his producer.

During his career, he directed various short fictions, experimental films and documentaries. He is also the author of two full-length films, "La fugue de Suzanne" (Suzanne's Fugue, 1974) and Mireille dans la vie des autres (Mireille and the Others, 1979). Mireille and the Others was entered into the 11th Moscow International Film Festival.

In 1968, he collaborated with Robbe De Hert in the realization of committed films and took part in the creation of "Cinélibre". In addition to work as screenwriter, script-doctor, manager and director of production, Jean-Marie Buchet also directed, until 2002, a workshop of writing of scenario at the Université libre de Bruxelles (ULB-ELICIT). He has been writing movie criticism in the "Grand Angle" review since 1996 and works in the service of film restoration at the royal Film Archive of Belgium since 1999.

== Films ==
- 1957: Two things (Deux Choses): Conference (Conference) and How to be hang himself (Comment se pendre) (animation) 4'30"
- 1959: Masks (Masques, Co-director: Marc Lobet; Music Fernand Schirren) 9'
- 1961: I love you (Je t'aime) 10'
- 1963: The day of Mr Thing (La journée de Monsieur Chose) 12'
- 1964: What can we make at home on a Sunday afternoon when we do not have a television? (Que peut-on bien faire chez soi le dimanche après-midi quand on a pas la télévision?) 18'
- 1967: The dead center (Le point mort) 20'
- 1970: Homage To Don Helder Camara (Hommage à Don Helder Camara) 11'
- 1974: Potemkine 3 15'
- 1974: The Running away of Suzanne (La Fugue de Suzanne) 140'
- 1974: Christmas' Trilogy (Triptyque de Noël) 25'
- 1974: Film 10'
- 1978: Your rights (Vos droits, TV serial)
- 1979: Mireille and the Others (Mireille dans la vie des autres) 86'.
  - His principal film, similar to Rohmer, Akerman or Pialat of "Master key your vat initially", but with an irony to typically tighten wallone, even boraine (its area of origin located at the west of the town of Mons). A second full-length film of fiction, bitter-sweet, on the daily life of late teenagers who prefer to live rather than to launch themselves in the active life with its obsession for competitiveness and profitability. In a word, to live rather than to survive in a world that breaks the dreams and format the desires.
- 1982: Bests (The) (Les Meilleurs) 28'
- 1983: Arrêt d'autobus 3'50" (video)
- 1983: Mille milliards
- 1988: Paris-Tubize
- 1989: Dupond Durand 8'
- 2001: Horrible 12'
- 2004: A famous day (Characteristic: There is a version in French Une fameuse journée and another in Dutch, one minute round longer, entitled Een Rare Dag.)
- 2004: Saddam Hussein is alive and well and He Lives in Brussels
- 2006: Tasse de thé (Cup of tea)
- 2009: Fantaisie sur la fin du monde (Fancy on the end of the world).

== Actor ==
Jean-Marie Buchet acted in the following comedies :

- Le banc (The bench) of Patrick Van Antwerpen (1973)
- L'autobus (The bus) of Patrick Van Antwerpen (1974)
- Le Saigneur est avec nous (The Slaughterer is with us) of Roland Lethem (1974)
- Grève et pets (Strike and farts) of Noël Godin (1976);
- Vivement ce soir (This evening ASAP) of Patrick Van Antwerpen (1985)
- Chloé of Patrice Bauduinet (2006)

== Writer ==
- A novel: Memory of Me – First Canto (Mémoire de Moi – Chant Premier)
- A book of poetry: The Homages' book (Le livre des hommages)
