= Seven Days in January =

1979 film

- Spanish: 7 días de enero
- Directed by: Juan Antonio Bardem
- Written by: Gregorio Morán; Juan Antonio Bardem
- Produced by: Serafín García Trueba
- Starring: Manuel Ángel Egea
- Cinematography: Leopoldo Villaseñor
- Release date: August 1979
- Running time: 180 minutes
- Country: Spain
- Language: Spanish

Seven Days in January (Spanish: 7 días de enero) is a 1979 Spanish drama film directed by Juan Antonio Bardem about the 1977 Atocha massacre. The film won the Golden Prize at 11th Moscow International Film Festival.

== Cast ==
- Manuel Ángel Egea as Luis María
- Madeleine Robinson as Adelaida
- Virginia Mataix as Pilar
- Jacques François as Don Tomás
- José Pedro Carrión as Francisco Javier Sauquillo
- Enriqueta Carballeira as Dolores González

== Production ==
It was produced by the communist millionaire Teodulfo Lagunero.
