= Henri Crolla =

Italian jazz guitarist and composer (1920–1960)

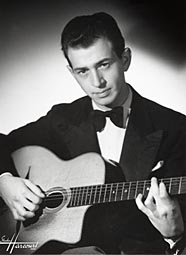
- Crolla, 1938

Background information
- Born: Enrico Crolla; 26 February 1920; Naples, Italy
- Died: 17 October 1960 Paris, France
- Genres: Italian jazz
- Occupation: Italian guitarist
- Instrument: Guitar
- Years active: 1940–1960

Henri Crolla (born Enrico Crolla; 26 February 1920 – 17 October 1960) was an Italian jazz guitarist and film composer.

Born in Naples, Campania, Italy, to a family of itinerant Neapolitan musicians, he moved with his family to Porte de Choisy in France in 1922 following the rise of fascism in Italy. One of his neighbours was a young Django Reinhardt, with whose family he became close. He also put to music many poems from Prévert's Paroles with Joseph Kosma. He died in Paris from lung cancer.

== Discography ==
- Jacques Prévert dit "paroles" (1954)
- 6 jolis petits airs (1955)
- Henri Crolla et son Ensemble (Mon Homme) EP (1955)
- Henri Crolla et son Ensemble (There's a Small Hotel) (1955)
- Le Long des Rues (1957)
- C'est Pour Toi Que Je Joue (1957)
- Quatre classiques du jazz (1957)
- Chansons dans le sang with Jacques Prévert (1960)
- Le Paris sentimental d'Henri Crolla (1962)
- Notre Ami Django (2001)
- Begin the Beguine (2002)
- Quand refleuriront les lilas blancs? (2002)

== Filmography ==
- Souvenirs perdus (1950) as a cameo guitarist
- Champs Élysées (1953)
- Enrico cuisinier (1954) also starring in it
- L'Étrange Désir de monsieur Bard (1954) features his song Car je t'aime
- Gas-Oil (1955)
- Les Bras de la Seine (1955)
- À propos d'une rivière (1955)
- Mon chien (1955)
- Le Ciel par dessus le toit (1956)
- Léon la lune (1956) in collaboration with André Hodeir
- Naughty Girl (1956) in collaboration with René Denoncin and Hubert Rostaing
- La Parisienne (1957) in collaboration with André Hodeir and Hubert Rostaing
- Django Reinhardt (1957) as a performer guitarist
- Fugitive in Saigon (1957)
- Péché de jeunesse (1958) with André Hodeir
- And Your Sister? (1958) with André Hodeir
- Paris mange son pain (1958) with André Hodeir
- Le vent se lève (1959) with André Hodeir
- Les Motards (1959)
- Ce corps tant désiré (1959)
- Black Orpheus (1959) as guitarist
- The Golden Fish (1959)
- The Restless and the Damned (1959) with André Hodeir
- Come Dance with Me (1959) with André Hodeir
- Photo souvenir (1960)
- Love and the Frenchwoman (Le Divorce segment) (1960)
- Les Primitifs du XIIIe (1960) with André Hodeir
- Os Bandeirantes (1960) with José Toledo
- Du côté de l'enfer (1960)
- Saint-Tropez Blues (1961) with André Hodeir
- Mon frère Jacques (1961)
- Le bonheur est pour demain (1962) with Georges Delerue
- Le Tout pour le tout (1963) with Renato de Oliveira
- World Without Sun (1964) with Serge Baudo and André Hodeir
- La Faim du monde (1969)
- Saint-Paul de Vence composed the song for Mouloudji with words from a poem by André Verdet

== Sources ==
- Les Ballades de Crolla by Norbert Gabriel and Sophie Tournel
- fr:Henri Crolla
