= Georges Lebacq =

Belgian painter

Georges Émile Lebacq
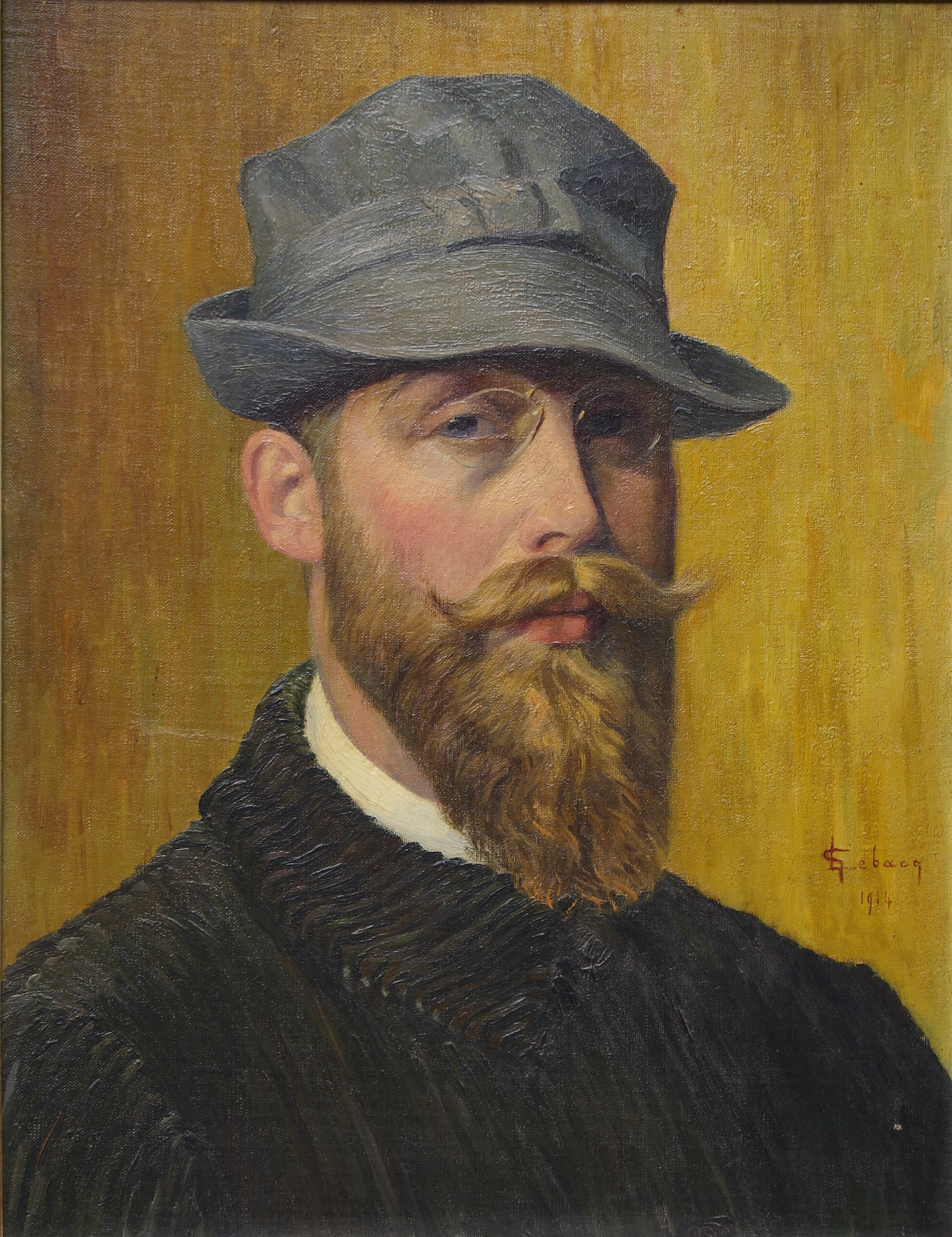
- Georges Émile Lebacq, Autoportrait, 1914
- Born: Georges Émile Lebacq; 26 September 1876; Jemappes, Belgium
- Died: 4 August 1950 (aged 73); Bruges, Belgium
- Known for: Painter
- Notable work: Poème d'Automne dans le Parc du Château d'Ognon, Abandon,...
- Movement: Impressionism, Post-Impressionism
- Awards: Prix du Jury du Salon des Artistes Français 1927

Georges-Émile Lebacq (26 September 1876, Jemappes – 4 August 1950, Bruges) was a Belgian painter.

== Biography ==
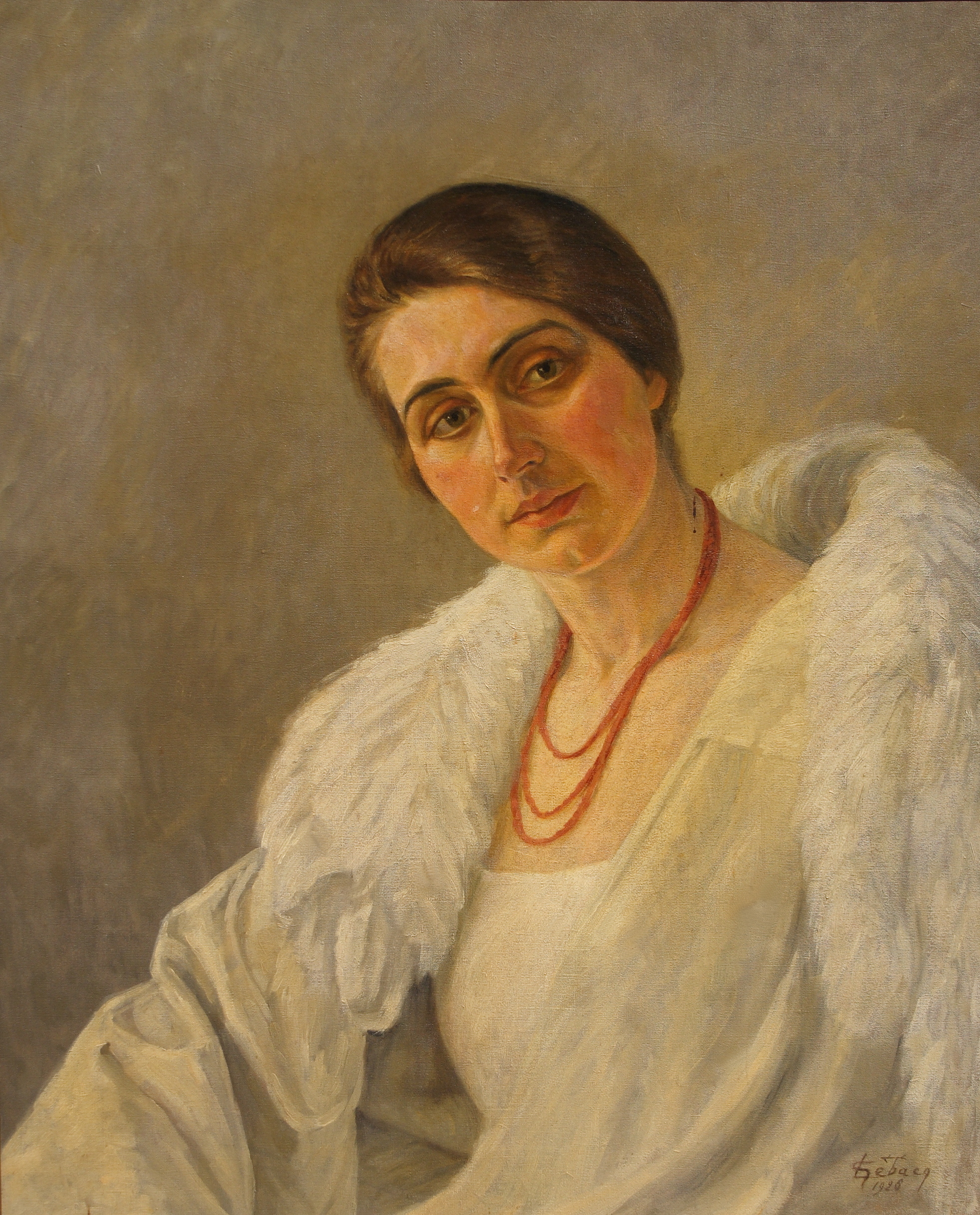
Melle Lebacq 1926

A Post-Impressionist and Impressionist painter, Lebacq was alternately a watercolourist, pastellist and portrait, landscape and still life painter. He also painted church interiors (stained-glass windows and paintings). Certain works as "Lumière d'été à Cagnes-sur-Mer" or "Le Repos en Terrasse" are impressionist. Initially self-taught, he first exhibited while a soldier during World War I. After the war he enrolled as a student at the Académie Julian at Paris in 1920, and thereafter worked mainly in France.

== Work ==
Most of Lebacq's paintings are in Beaux-Arts Mons ("BAM", the museum of fine arts in Mons, Belgium), the Musée de la Venerie in Senlis, France, the Musée Renoir in Cagnes-sur-Mer, France, the Royal Museum of the Armed Forces and Military History in Brussels, or in private collections.

== Gallery ==
Georges Lebacq's works

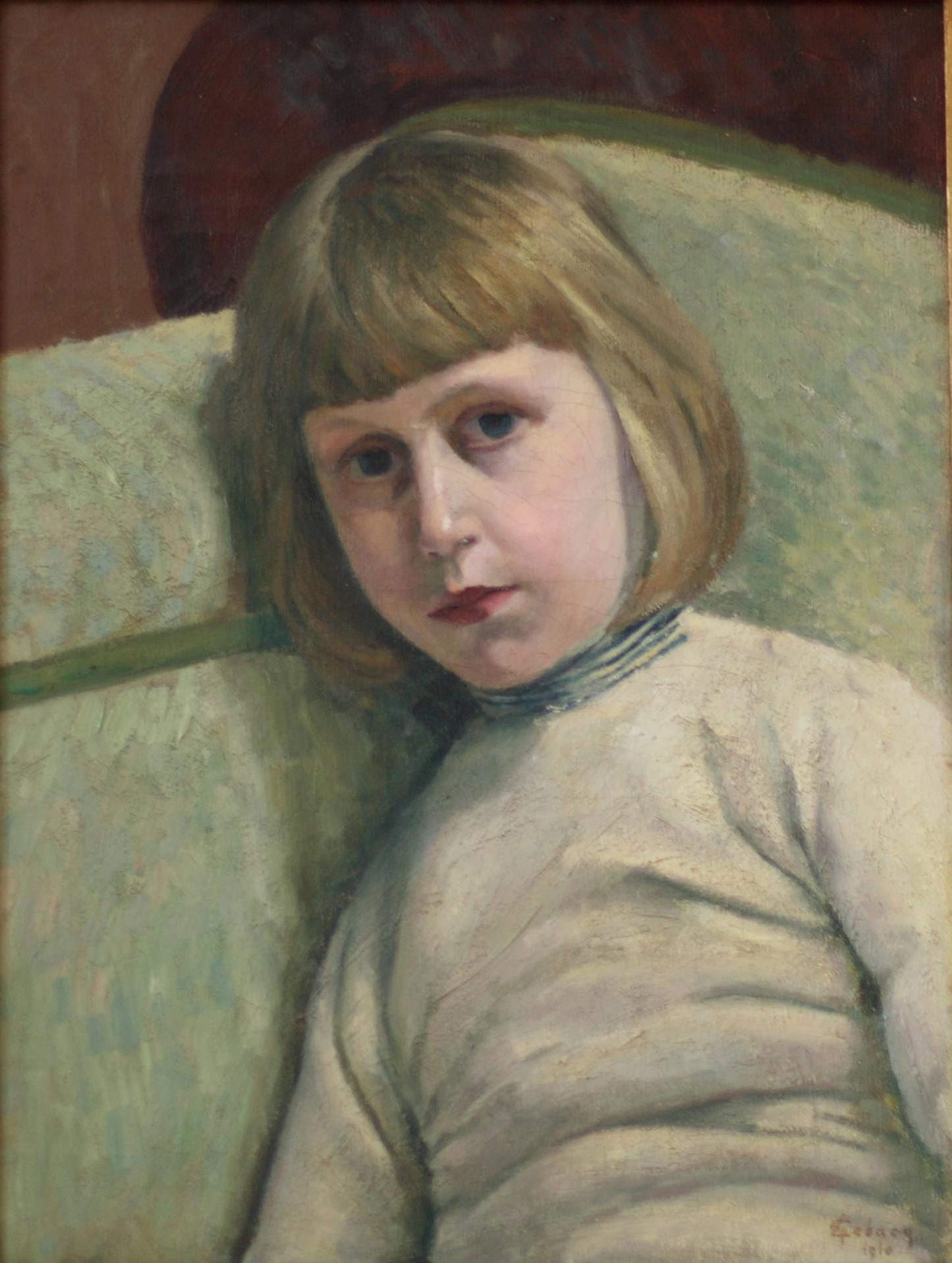
Portrait de Georges Lebacq (fils) enfant 1910

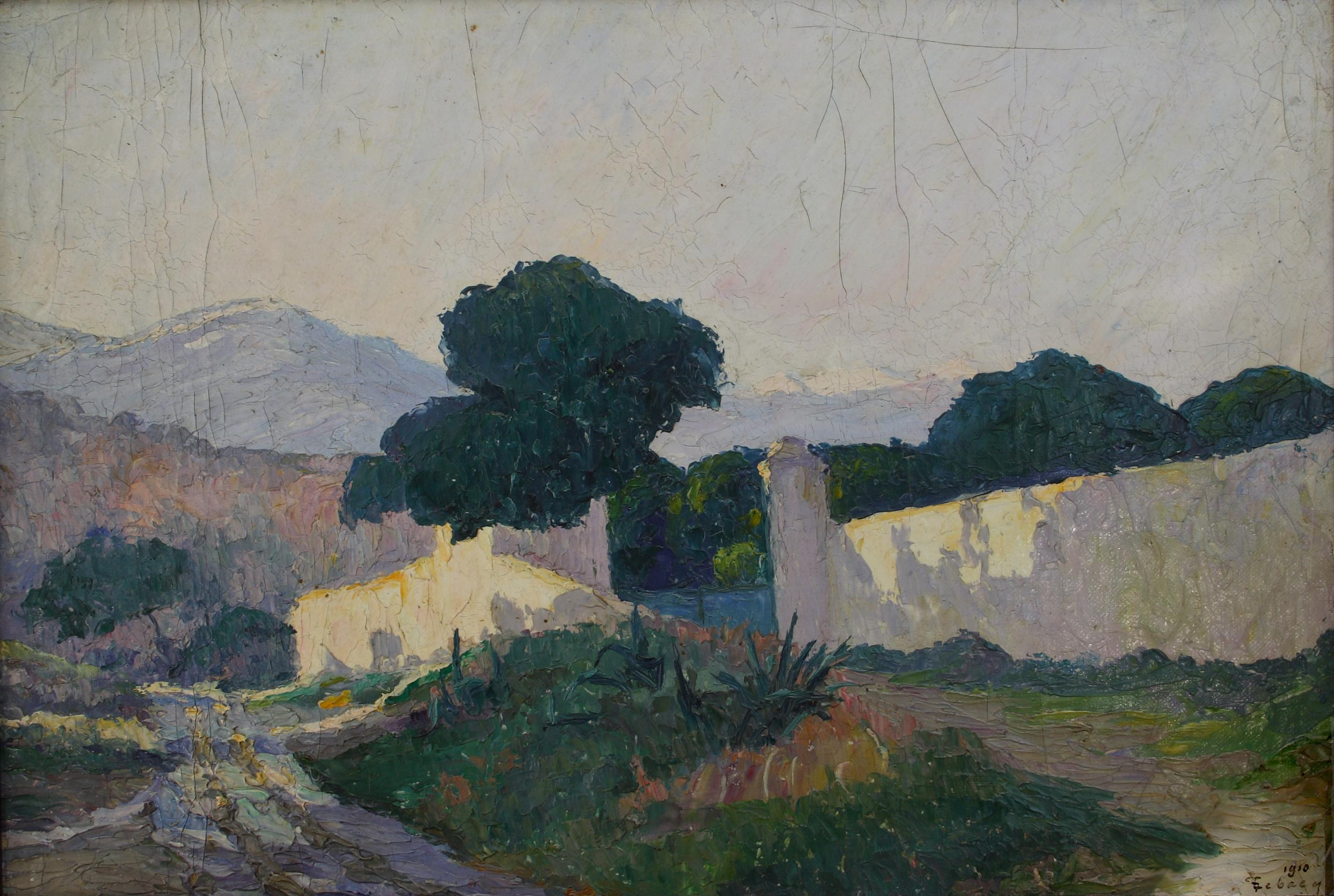
Cagnes 1910

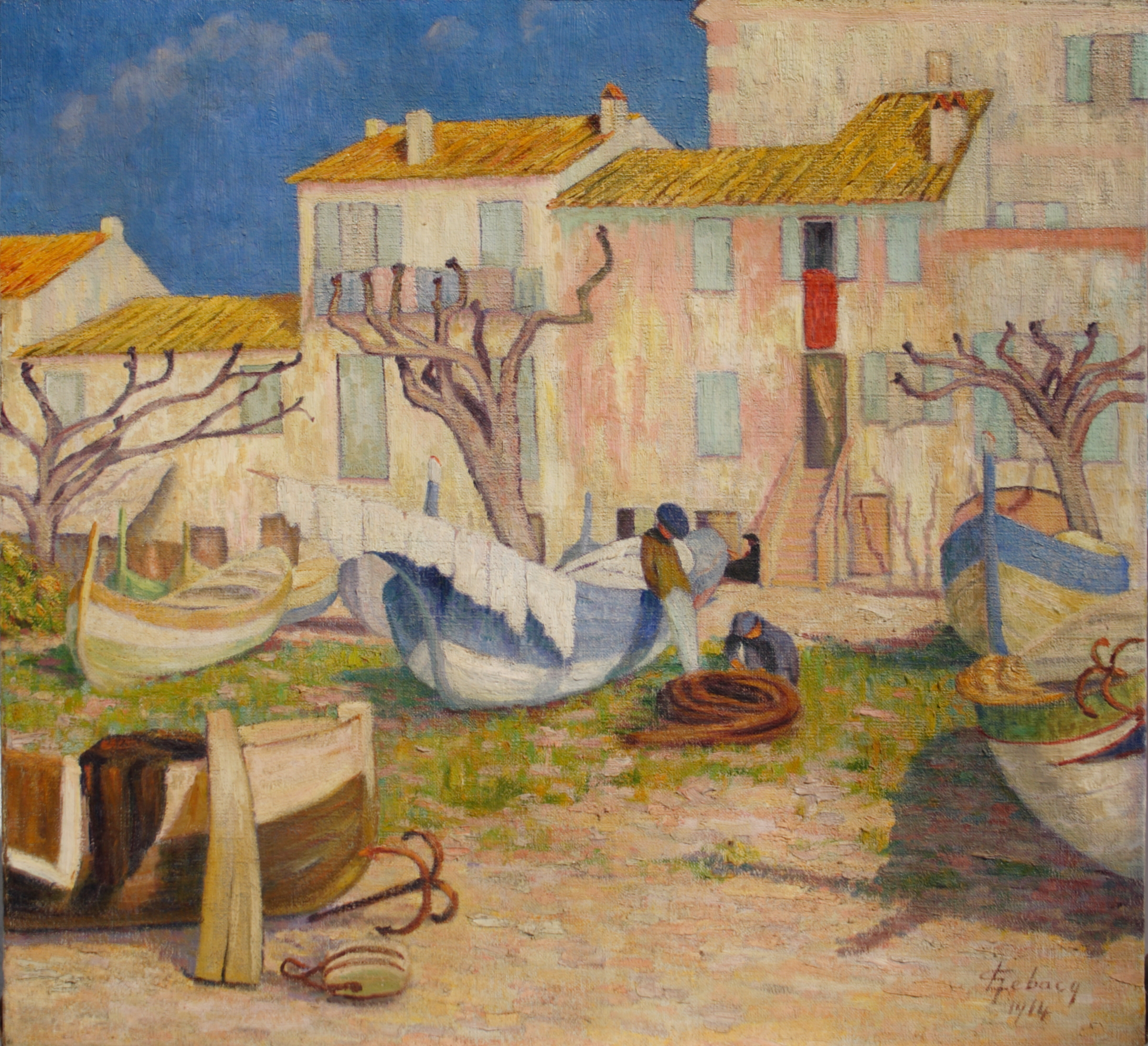
A Cros de Cagnes 1914

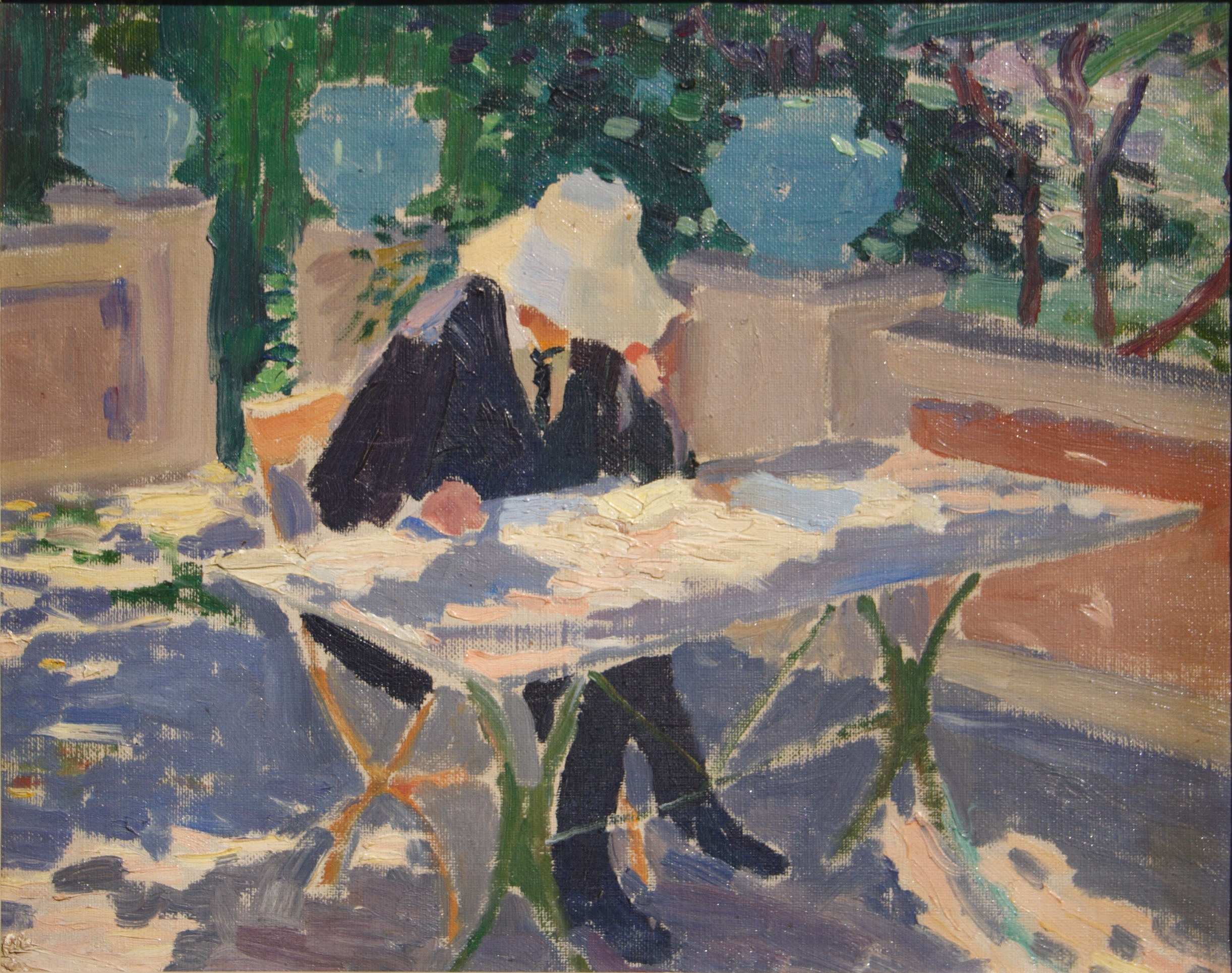
Lumière d'été à Cagnes Circa 1918

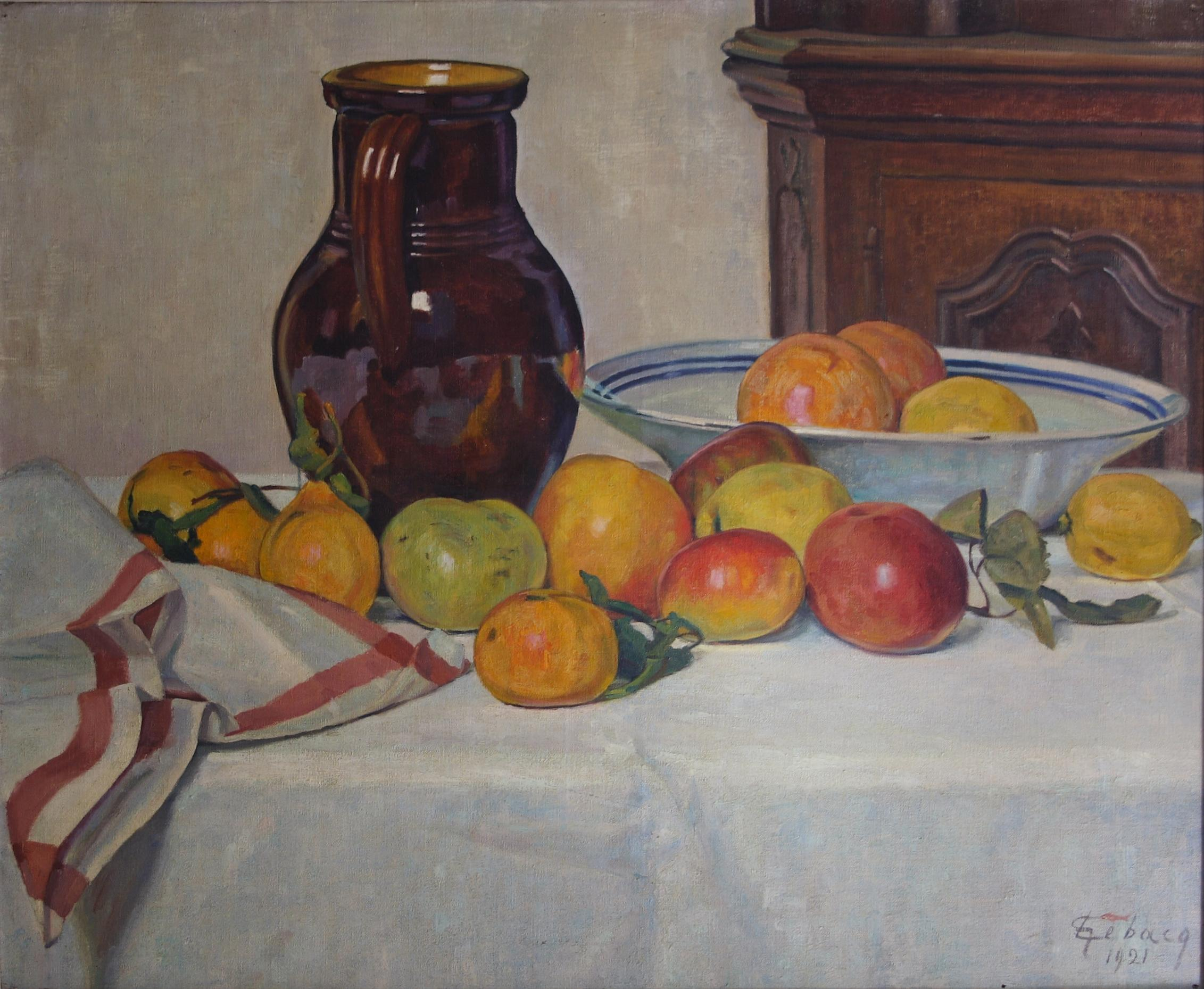
Fruits 1921

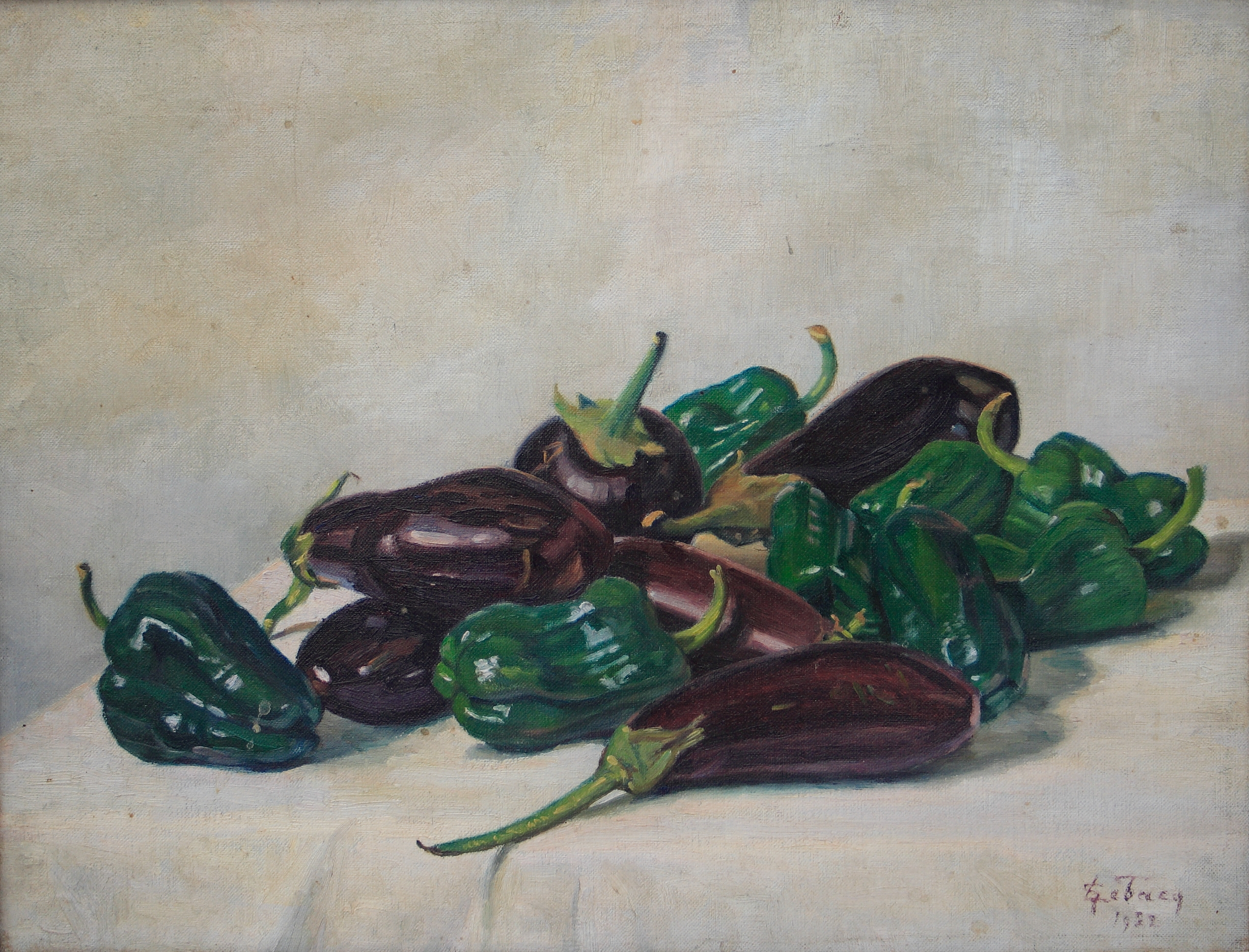
Poivrons et Aubergines 1922

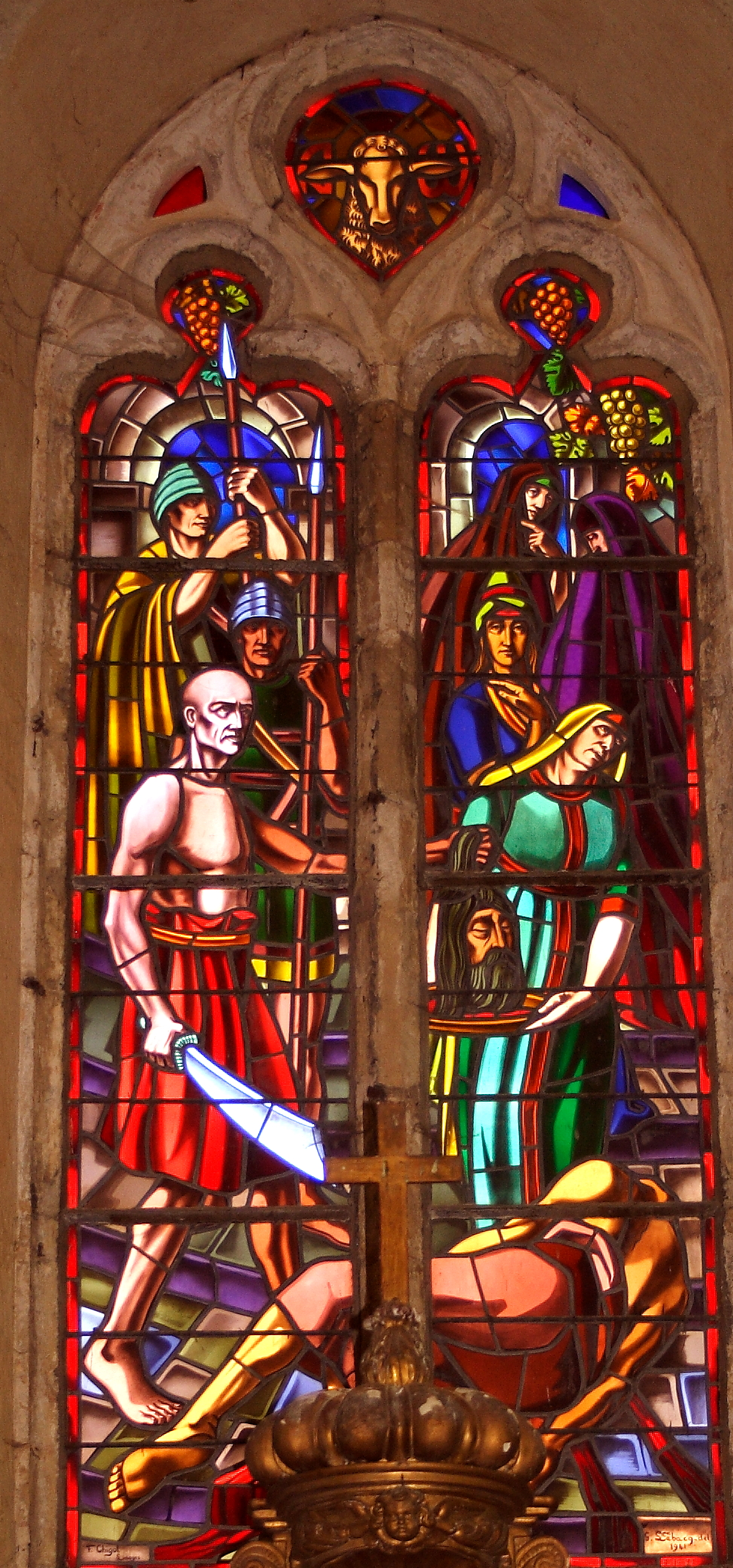
Vitrail du Choeur de l'église de Goudou (France) Décollation de St Jean-Baptiste 1941

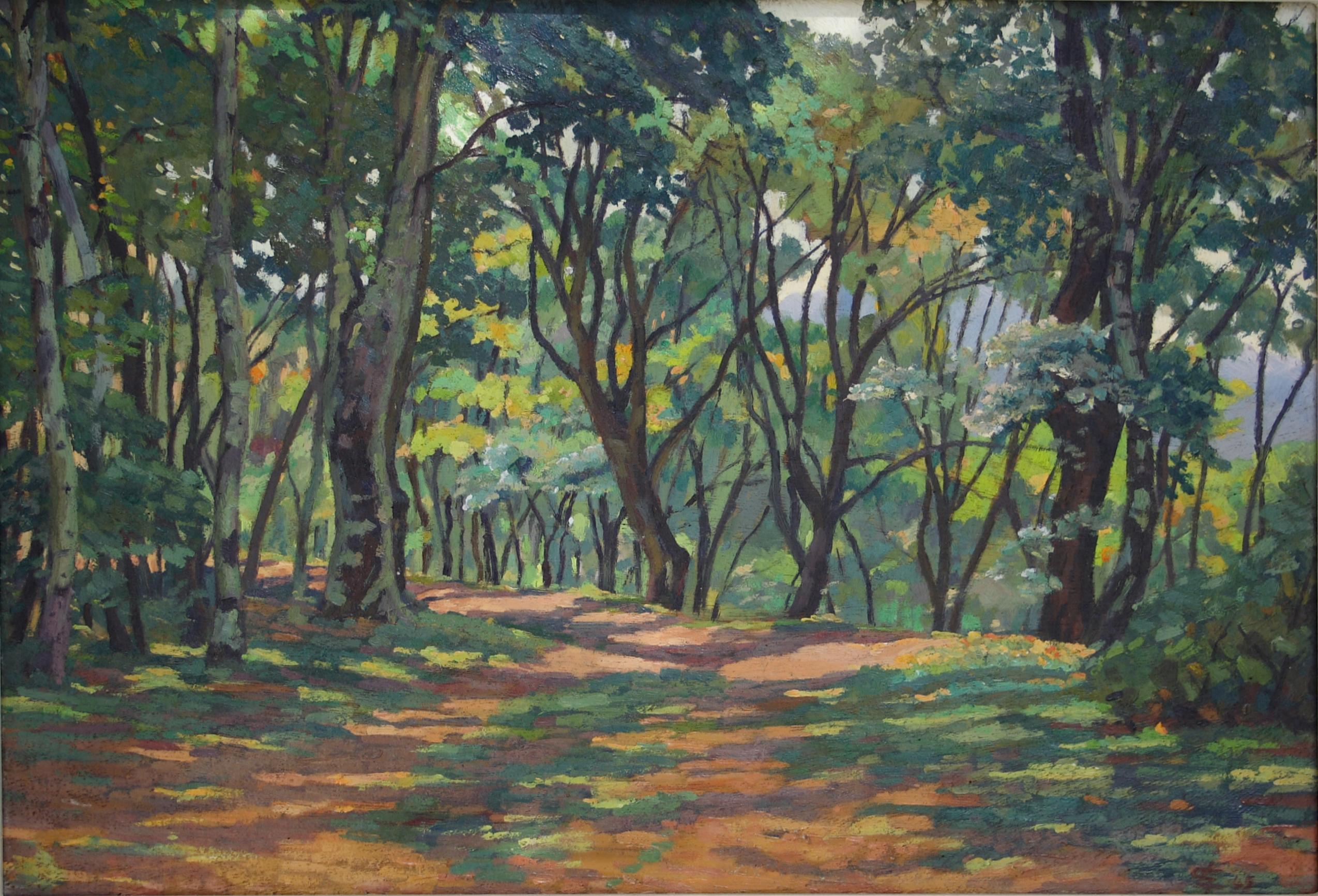
Cougnac 1945

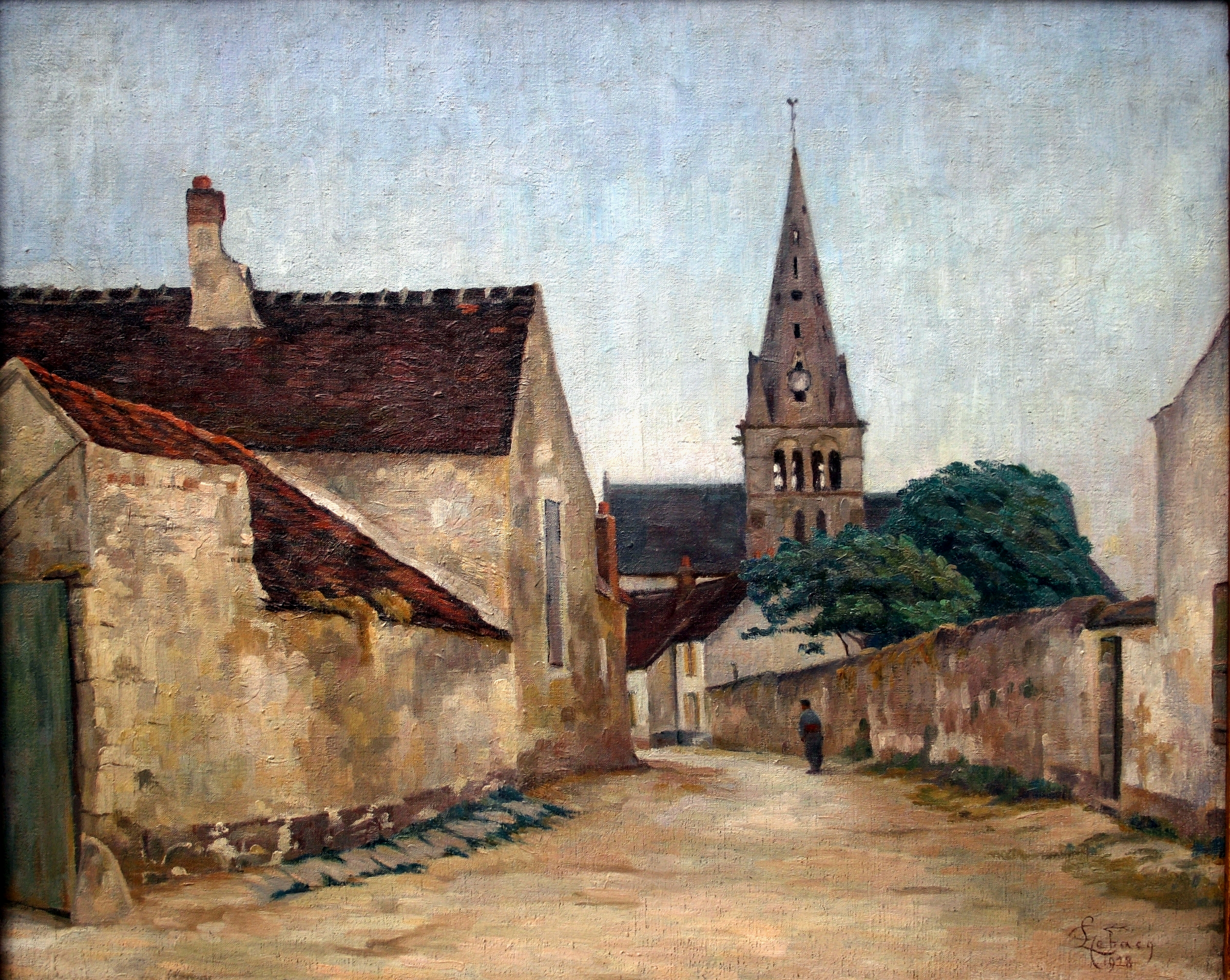
Rue à Chamant 1928

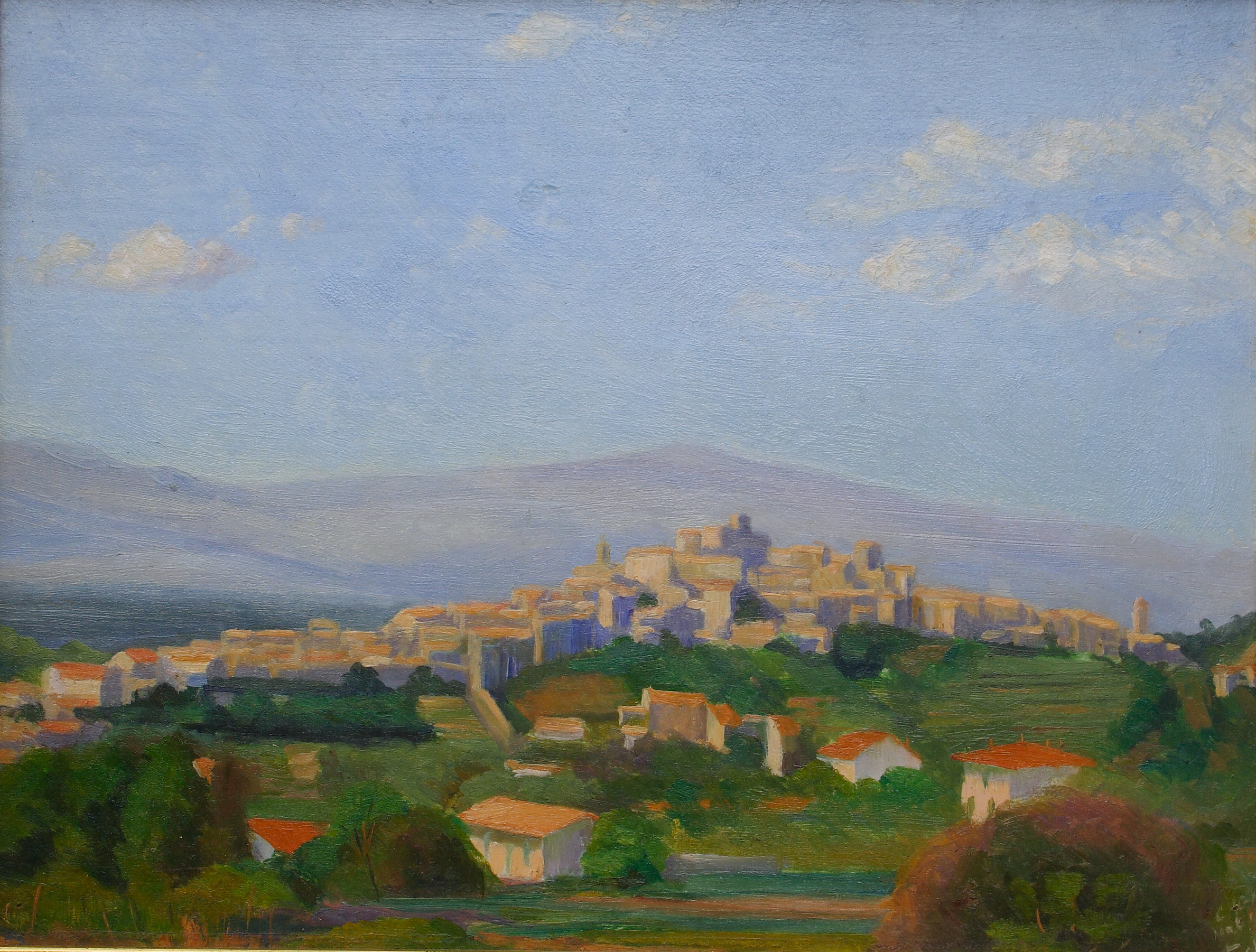
Cagnes sur mer, 1910
