= The Blockhouse =

1973 film by Clive Rees

- British theatrical poster
- Directed by: Clive Rees
- Screenplay by: John Gould; Clive Rees
- Based on: The Blockhouse (1958 novel) by Jean-Paul Clébert
- Produced by: Edgar Bronfman Jr.; Antony Rufus-Isaacs
- Starring: Peter Sellers; Charles Aznavour; Jeremy Kemp; Per Oscarsson; Peter Vaughan; Nicholas Jones; Leon Lissek
- Cinematography: Keith Goddard
- Edited by: Peter Gold
- Music by: Stanley Myers
- Production company: Galactacus; Audley Associates; Reel World Associates
- Distributed by: Hemdale Film Corporation (UK)
- Release date: 6 June 1973 (Berlin)
- Running time: 93 minutes
- Country: United Kingdom
- Language: English

The Blockhouse is a 1973 British survival drama film directed by Clive Rees and starring Peter Sellers, Charles Aznavour, Jeremy Kemp, Per Oscarsson, Peter Vaughan, Nicholas Jones and Leon Lissek. Based on a 1955 novel by Jean-Paul Clébert and produced by Edgar Bronfman Jr., it is about a group of forced labourers during World War II, who become trapped in an underground storehouse for years. It's noted as a rare dramatic role for Sellers.

The film premiered at the 23rd Berlin International Film Festival, where it was nominated for the Golden Bear. Despite positive reviews, it was not widely released in the United Kingdom and failed to find an audience.

== Plot ==
On D-Day, a mixed-national group of forced labourers held by German forces take shelter from the bombardment inside a German bunker, but are then entombed when the entrances are blocked by shelling damage. By coincidence, the bunker is a storehouse, so the prisoners have enough food and wine to last them for years. However, they are trapped not for years but permanently, and the film analyses how they deal with their underground prison, with their relationships, and with death.

== Cast ==
- Peter Sellers as Rouquet
- Charles Aznavour as Visconti
- Jeremy Kemp as Grabinski
- Per Oscarsson as Lund
- Peter Vaughan as Aufret
- Nicholas Jones as Kromer
- Leon Lissek as Kozhek
- Alfred Lynch as Larshen

== Historical basis ==
The book and film appear to have been inspired by a possibly true story: On 25 June 1951, Time magazine reported that two German soldiers claimed to have been trapped for six years in an underground storehouse in Babie Doły, Republic of Poland. They had survived on canned food and condensation. Four of the six years were spent in total darkness after they ran out of candles. There were originally six men, but two committed suicide and another two died of natural causes. Upon their rescue, one died of a heart attack immediately upon seeing sunlight, while the other was hospitalized.

Various other dates and locations have been given for the alleged incident, including 1947 and 1948, and Gdańsk. A 1955 short story called Gdy zgasnienie Słońca (transl. When the Sun Goes Out), by Polish writer Zenon Skierski, was supposedly based on a diary of the survivor of the incident. Other creative works, including a poem and a stage play, had been written about the incident.

The veracity of the report is unclear, the reports made no mention of the men's names, nor of the sole survivor's ultimate fate. By the late 1950s, the story had been widely reported in Germany and was considered a hoax there. A 1958 report by Der Spiegel reads:

"Because the Polish side did not comment on the reports - as late as last week the press office of the ministry of the interior in Warsaw said "we do not know this case at all" - the producers of so-called true stories have repeated the popular episode in many different forms for years. Last December ... even a first East-German version of this old horror story appeared ... which was created by a secondary school teacher named Hans Pfeiffer from Grimma in Saxony. The Pfeiffer story could as well have been from a West-German tabloid, especially since the author tried to increase the drama by adding a twelve-year old refugee girl to his vault dwellers."

That same year, the West German film Nasser Asphalt portrayed an event similar to the alleged incident as a fabrication.

== Production ==
=== Development ===
Edgar Bronfman Jnr, when only a teenager, was working on one of his father's films in London while on summer vacation. He came across a script called The Blockhouse by John Gould and Clive Rees. In the summer of 1972 Bronfman and Anthony Rufus-Isaacs combined to produce the film.

"I've fallen in love with producing" said Bronfman "and I plan to make it my life's work."

Rufus-Isaacs himself denies that Bronfman made any substantive contribution to the movie, stating: “My supposed co-producer, Edgar Bronfman Jr., was a goofy 17-year-old American high-school kid, with braces on his teeth and big round glasses. He tagged along every day in a tie-dyed denim suit, without adding any value.”

Per Rufus-Isaacs, Bronfman’s involvement in the movie was only arranged as an attempt to obtain funding from his father, “the immensely rich Edgar Bronfman Sr., who owned the Seagram Company,” though no such funding would ever be forthcoming.

=== Filming ===
The film was shot entirely on the isle of Guernsey in the Channel Islands. Filming took place in June 1972.

"It's a film for the connoisseurs of cinema," said Sellers. "It's a very heavy movie. It could easily put you on a downer... Clive Rees, who directed it, is brilliant, every bit as good as Stanley Kubrick.

== Release ==
The film was shown at the Berlin Film Festival but was never given a general release in Britain. Hemdale Film Corporation recut the film adding footage to show time passing, and putting in a new ending where the two lead characters survived. Cannon Films initially acquired U.S. theatrical rights, and gave it a limited release beginning in January 1974.

=== Home media ===
The film was initially released on DVD by MGM in 2005, and later re-released on Blu-ray by Powerhouse Films in January 2022.

== Reception ==
The film currently holds a 73% approval rating (based on 126 reviews) on Rotten Tomatoes.

The Monthly Film Bulletin wrote: "This real-life horror story ...begins with a remarkably deft if conventional prologue, describing the work routine in a Nazi slave labour camp and the confusion created by a naval bombardment which leads to the main characters' entombment. The lively camerawork and editing in this sequence lends an edge of expectancy as to how the film – as much as its characters – will subsequently face up to the cruel confinement. Its response, unfortunately, turns out to be a painfully solemn and unrewarding self-martyrdom. Once the characters are over their ecstatic discovery of sufficient food and other necessities to keep them in a style to which they've never been accustomed, and the first hints of conflict (and even of clear character delineation) have been worn away by the encroaching boredom, the film simply settles down to record their physical degeneration. It piously refuses to detach itself from their experience, and to offer any kind of reflection on the situation which would enable the viewer to apprehend it as anything other than an uncomfortable way to spend an hour and a half. The international mixture of star names in the cast rather baldly and inadequately conjures up the crosssection of pillaged Europe which these slave workers represent. But given the film's minimal dramatic means, its refusal to supply much in the way of personal histories or social backgrounds, these star personas are occasionally driven dangerously close to the surface: when the film allows itself a rare comic interlude, for instance, as schoolteacher Peter Sellers tries to work out his own confusion about how the game of dominoes could be of both English and Greek origin, it suddenly seems as if Sellers is emerging from the shadows to play Inspector Clouseau. Only Jeremy Kemp, as the strong and silent figure of authority, benefits from the reticence of the film – which otherwise comes across as a Pinter play without the Pinter dialogue. Despite its barrenness, finally, there is something tautological about The Blockhouse: its painstakingly murky, ill-lit visuals becoming an unnecessary representation of its thematic obscurity and its dimness of character."

TV Guide states that "the film tries to study men in a terrible, claustrophobic setting, but it never reveals the true nature of the characters or a metaphysical reason for their predicament. A worthy idea that sadly goes nowhere."

== See also ==
- The Cavern (1964)
