= Mireille and the Others =

1979 film

- Directed by: Jean-Marie Buchet
- Written by: Jean-Marie Buchet
- Produced by: Godefroid Courtmans
- Starring: Véronique Speeckaert
- Cinematography: Patrice Payen
- Release date: August 1979
- Running time: 90 minutes
- Country: Belgium
- Language: French

Mireille and the Others (French: Mireille dans la vie des autres) is a 1979 Belgian drama film written and directed by Jean-Marie Buchet. It was entered into the 11th Moscow International Film Festival.

== Cast ==
- Sylvain Bailly as Jacques
- Yvonne Clech as Mère de Jacques
- Chantal Descampagne as Edwige
- Jean-Pierre Dougnac as Père de Jacques
- Alain Lamarque as Alphonse
- Michel Lechat as Oscar
- Tatiana Moukhine as Germaine
- Eric Schoonejans as Sylvain
- Véronique Speeckaert as Mireille
