= The Killing Game (1967 film) =

1967 French comedy film

- A poster bearing the film's French title: Jeu de massacre
- Directed by: Alain Jessua
- Written by: Alain Jessua
- Produced by: Louis Duchesne; Monique Emile Natan; René Thévenet
- Starring: Jean-Pierre Cassel
- Cinematography: Jacques Robin
- Edited by: Nicole Marko
- Music by: Jacques Loussier
- Release date: 25 October 1967
- Running time: 90 minutes
- Country: France
- Language: French

The Killing Game (French: Jeu de massacre) is a 1967 French comedy film directed by Alain Jessua. It was entered into the 1967 Cannes Film Festival where it won the award for Best Screenplay.

== Cast ==
- Jean-Pierre Cassel as Pierre Meyrand
- Claudine Auger as Jacqueline Meyrand
- Michel Duchaussoy as Bob Neuman
- Eléonore Hirt as Geneviève Neuman
- Guy Saint-Jean as Ado
- Anna Gaylor as Lisbeth
- Nancy Holloway as Brigitte

== Reception ==
Stanley Kauffmann of The New Republic described The Killing Game as "disappointing".
