= The Dogs (film) =

1979 film

- Directed by: Alain Jessua
- Written by: André Ruellan; Alain Jessua
- Produced by: Laurent Meyniel
- Starring: Gérard Depardieu; Victor Lanoux
- Cinematography: Étienne Becker
- Edited by: Hélène Plemiannikov
- Music by: René Koering; Michel Portal
- Distributed by: Compagnie Commerciale Française Cinématographique (CCFC); Groupement des Editeurs de Films (GEF)
- Release date: 7 March 1979
- Running time: 100 minutes
- Country: France
- Language: French
- Box office: $2.8 million

The Dogs (French: Les Chiens) is a 1979 French drama horror film directed by Alain Jessua. It was entered into the 11th Moscow International Film Festival.

== Plot ==
A young doctor, Doctor Henri Ferret, has just moved to the Paris region. Many of his patients consult after being bitten. He learns that, to protect themselves from nocturnal attacks, the inhabitants have bought guard dogs ... Morel, who trains the dogs, as well as some inhabitants, have an excessive love for these animals, whereas these sometimes show themselves dangerous and unpredictable, especially when a dog kills for no reason.

== Cast ==
- Gérard Depardieu as Morel
- Victor Lanoux as Doctor Henri Ferret
- Nicole Calfan as Elisabeth
- Pierre Vernier as Gauthier
- Fanny Ardant as L'infirmière
- Philippe Klébert as Franck
- Régis Porte as Jacques
- Gérard Séty as Le maire
- Philippe Mareuil as Beauchamp
- Henri Labussière as Montagnac, le pharmacien
- Anna Gaylor as Madame Colin
