= Farouk Beloufa =

- Born: April 9, 1947; Oued Fodda, Algeria
- Died: April 9, 2018 (aged 71); 10th arrondissement of Paris, France
- Citizenship: Algerian
- Occupations: Film director, screenwriter, film critic
- Notable work: Nahla (1979)

Farouk Beloufa (in Arabic: فاروق بلوفة) born 9 April 1947 in Oued Fodda, Algeria and died on 9 April 2018 in Paris. was an Algerian film director, screenwriter, and critic, best known for his film Nahla (1979).

== Biography ==
Farouk Beloufa was born in Oued Fodda in 1947. He studied at the National Institute of Cinema (INC) in Algiers before going to France to pursue further studies at the Institute for Advanced Cinematographic Studies (Institut des hautes études cinématographiques) in Paris. Beloufa began his career as a critic before turning to directing. He also worked as a screenwriter and assistant on international productions, including collaborations with Youssef Chahine.

In the 1970s, Beloufa directed several documentary and short films. One of his notable projects, Insurrectionnelle (1972), was censored and re-edited by the authorities at the time, leading to a released version without his signature.

He also collaborated as a screenwriter on other regional projects; he was credited as a co-writer on Youssef Chahine’s film Le Retour de l’enfant prodigue (The Return of the Prodigal Son).

His only film, Nahla (1979), shot primarily in Beirut, deals with the Lebanese Civil War through the eyes of politically and culturally engaged characters. The film was selected for competition at the 11th Moscow International Film Festival (1979), where the lead actress, Yasmine Khlat, won the Best Actress award. Nahla has been screened again as part of various retrospectives and special programs.

== Filmography ==
=== Director ===
- 1960: Situation de transition (short film) — mentioned in some sources as a student work (copies lost).
- 1972: Insurrectionnelle (documentary) — partially censored and re-edited.
- 1979: Nahla (feature film) — director and screenwriter.

=== Screenwriter / collaborations ===
- 1976: Le Retour de l’enfant prodigue — screenplay collaboration with Youssef Chahine
- Note: Some short films and documentaries from the 1960s–1970s are listed differently across sources; certain works are believed to be lost or re-edited by other teams.

== Awards ==
- Official competition – 11th Moscow International Film Festival (1979) for Nahla; Yasmine Khlat received the Best Actress Award.

== Reception and legacy ==
Nahla is frequently cited by film historians and curators as an important work in North African and Arab cinema of the 1970s. The film continues to be screened at festivals and retrospectives and has been the subject of numerous essays and film analyses.
