= Lars Bo =

Danish artist and writer

Lars Bo (29 May 1924 in Kolding – 21 October 1999 in Paris) was a Danish artist and writer. He is known for his graphic works with surrealistically inspired fantastic motifs. He was nicknamed "Wizard".

== Early life and education ==
Lars Bo worked with P. Rostrup Bøyesen at Statens Museum for Kunst in the period from 1939 to 1940. He went to The Danish Design School from 1941. In 1942, he interrupted his studies to join the Danish resistance against the German occupation during the Second World War.

== Career ==
From 1948 to 1950 Lars Bo worked in Johnny Friedläender and Albert Flocons graphic studio in Paris. Lars Bo wrote the novel Det vidunderlige hus i Paris ("The Wonderful House in Paris").

Lars Bo moved to Paris in the early 1950s to study art and printmaking techniques at the famous Atelier 17, under the directorship of Stanley William Hayter. Bo began a long and successful career as an artist of the illustrated book in 1952. Until 1996 he produced etchings and aquatints for many illustrated books. Some of his most significant works in this field are for editions of the works of Hans Christian Andersen.

Lars Bo began exhibiting his individual prints and paintings in Paris in 1954. Shortly thereafter he became a leading artist for the French periodical, Le Monde. By 1960 Bo had established an international reputation (especially for his original prints) and exhibitions of his art were held in England, the United States and Japan.

== Personal life and death ==
From 1947 until his death in 1999 he lived in Paris.

== Awards and accolades ==
He won the Prix de Gravure at the Paris Biennale.

== Collections ==
- Art Museum of Southeast Texas, Beaumont, Texas
