= Qui? =

Studio album by Charles Aznavour
- Released: 1963
- Genre: Chanson
- Label: Barclay
- Producer: Paul Mauriat (orchestration)

Charles Aznavour chronology
Charles Aznavour accompagné par Burt Random et Paul Mauriat (1962)	Qui? (1963)	La mamma (1963)

Qui? (Who?) is the tenth French studio album by the French-Armenian singer Charles Aznavour, released in 1963.

It was reissued as a CD on January 3, 1995 by EMI.

== Track listing ==
1. For Me, Formidable (Charles Aznavour / Jacques Plante)
2. Au clair de mon âme (Charles Aznavour)
3. Dors (Charles Aznavour)
4. Qui ? (Charles Aznavour)
5. O ! Toi la vie (Charles Aznavour)
6. Trop tard (Alex Alstone / Charles Aznavour)
7. Donne tes seize ans (Charles Aznavour / Georges Garvarentz)
8. Tu exagères (Charles Aznavour)
9. Jolies mômes de mon Quartier (Charles Aznavour)
10. Bon Anniversaire (Charles Aznavour)
11. Les Deux Pigeons (Charles Aznavour)
12. Il viendra ce jour (Charles Aznavour)

== Track listing of the 1995 CD Reissue ==
1. For Me, Formidable (Charles Aznavour / Jacques Plante)
2. Au Clair de Mon Âme (Charles Aznavour)
3. Dors (Charles Aznavour)
4. Qui ? (Charles Aznavour)
5. O ! Toi la Vie (Charles Aznavour)
6. Trop Tard (Alex Alstone / Charles Aznavour)
7. Donne Tes Seize Ans (Charles Aznavour / Georges Garvarentz)
8. Tu Exagères (Charles Aznavour)
9. Jolies Mômes de Mon Quartier (Charles Aznavour)
10. Bon Anniversaire (Charles Aznavour)
11. Les Deux Pigeons (Charles Aznavour)
12. Et Je Vais (Charles Aznavour)
13. Pour Faire une Jam (Charles Aznavour)
14. Au Creux de Mon Épaule (Charles Aznavour)
15. Il Pleut (Charles Aznavour)
16. Sur la Table (Charles Aznavour)
17. Sa Jeunesse (Charles Aznavour)

== Personnel ==
- Charles Aznavour - Author, Composer, Vocals
- Georges Garvarentz - Composer
- Alex Alstone - Composer
- Jacques Plante - Composer

== Links ==
- original version of Qui?
