= Roger Assaf =

Lebanese playwright

Roger Assaf (Arabic: روجيه عساف; born in 1941) is a Lebanese playwright, director and actor.

== Biography ==
He was born in Lebanon, son of Joseph Assaf and Rosette Brunas. His father was Lebanese and his mother was French. He studied in Frères School, Furn el Chebbak, then in Frères Jemmayzé. He studied medicine at Université Saint Joseph (USJ) for four years, but left studies to concentrate on acting.

At age 12, he landed an acting role in a play directed by Henri Khayyat. He established a university theatre center staging experimental plays. He collaborated in television stagings with Jean-Claude Boulos, Antoine Remé, Elias Matta and Antoine Machhour.

In 1963, he received a grant from the French Embassy in Lebanon to study acting in Strasbourg, France. In 1965, he was part of the renaissance of Lebanese theatre and in 1966, he was a co-founder of the College of Arts in the Lebanese University, establishing المركز المسرحي الجامعي (C.U.E.D). He was also one of the co-founders of Theatre de Beyrouth (in Arabic مسرح بيروت) in Ain Mreissé, Beirut where he had a great number of plays, as director and actor. His play Majdaloun («مجدلون») about the Palestinian armed presence in South Lebanon was censored and stopped by the Lebanese authorities only after 3 days of its launch.

He participated in plays with Gabriel Boustani, Jalal Khoury, Chakib Khoury, Yacoub Chedraoui, Hassan Alaa Eddin (known as Chouchou), the Rahbani Brothers (notably in Ayam Fakhreddine—أيام فخر الدين) and with Mounir Abou Debs. In 1968 he co-founded with Nidal al Achkar Muhtaraf Beirut lil Masrah (in Arabic محترف بيروت للمسرح). In 1979, he established his own hakawati house and in 2005, Duwwar el Chams Center (in Arabic دوار الشمس) for encouraging youth to be involved in theatre.

In 1985, he published the book «المسرحة - أقنعة المدينة». Also in 1985, he produced the film Maaraka (in Arabic «معركة») In 2007, he published the study «في العمل المسرحي والسياسي في لبنان»

Assaf has won numerous prizes for his works including the Golden Lion at the Venice Biennale in 2008.

== Personal life ==
Assaf married Marie-Claude Eddé. After divorce he married Hanane el Hajj Ali, and had four children with her, Zeinab, Ali, Mariam and Youssef. Born in a Christian family, he was active in Francophonie, was a Marxist and left wing activist, a supporter of the Palestinian Cause, and eventually converting to Islam in 1986.

== Bibliography ==
- "Les "petites grandes idées" de Roger Assaf pour rapprocher les communautés", Le Monde, 2001-04-09, https://www.lemonde.fr/archives/article/2001/04/09/les-petites-grandes-idees-de-roger-assaf-pour-rapprocher-les-communautes_170661_1819218.html
- "Roger Assaf : C'est aux anarchistes que je m'identifie le plus..." L'Orient-Le Jour (in French). 2018-12-28.
- "«Je suis un capitaliste des valeurs humaines», entretien avec Roger Assaf". www.babelmed.net. January 2009.
