= Pieter De Spiegeleer =

Belgian politician

Member of the Chamber of Representatives
- Incumbent
- Assumed office 2019

Personal details
- Born: Pieter De Spiegeleer; 2 October 1981 (age 44) Haaltert, Belgium
- Party: Vlaams Belang

Pieter De Spiegeleer (born 2 October 1981) is a Belgian politician who is a member of the Chamber of Representatives for the Vlaams Belang party.

De Spiegeleer worked as a civil servant at the Federal Public Service Employment the and later for the Flanders Investment and Trade department. He has claimed he was bullied from his workplace as a result of his support for Vlaams Belang. In 2015, he set up a new Vlaams Belang chapter in Haaltert after the party did not compete in the municipality during 2012 local elections and lost its representatives. He took part in the municipal elections in 2015 for the first time with the renewed Haaltertse Vlaams Belang chapter and was elected as a municipal councilor. During the 2019 Belgian federal election De Spiegeleer stood in fourth place on the East Flanders constituency list and was subsequently elected to the federal parliament.

De Spiegeleer currently lives in Heldergem.
