= Jean-Paul Clébert =

French writer (1926–2011)

- Born: 23 February 1926; Paris
- Died: 21 September 2011 (aged 85); Oppède, France
- Occupations: Writer, Journalist

Jean-Paul Clébert (23 February 1926 – 21 September 2011) was a French writer.

== Biography ==
Before completing his studies in a Jesuit college, Jean-Paul Clébert left to join the French Resistance in 1943 at the age of 16. After the liberation, he spent six months in Asia and then returned to France. He described his unusual life:

My secondary education was interrupted by the war but continued as a prisoner. I have never had a regular job but have been successively a house painter, cook, newspaper seller, farm worker, navvy, undertaker’s mute, valet, cafe proprietor and tramp. Lived for some years with gipsies and am now engaged on writing a book about them. Have also traveled widely in the East. I now live alone on a farm in Haute Provence.

On returning he lived for 3 or 4 years as a clochard amongst the many homeless people in the underground world of Paris. This experience inspired his classic study of the underworld of Paris Paris insolite/Unknown Paris (1952), which he dedicated to his companions Robert Giraud and photographer Robert Doisneau. The book was championed by the remaining Surrealists, and the emerging Situationists based their theory of the dérive on Clébert's principles, using his book as a literal guide to the underside of the city. An illustrated edition with photos of Patrice Molinard (who debuted as a stills photographer on Georges Franju's documentary le Sang des bêtes) and layout by Massin was published in 1954. On the occasion of the book's reissue by Attila in 2009 he said:

it was not a story in a journalistic sense, it was a personal investigation, it was me in the streets of Paris.

Clébert’s friends Jacques Yonnet and Robert Giraud were inspired to write their own tales of the vagabond life on the streets of Paris; Yonnet’s Rue des Maléfices (1954), his sole novel (originally Enchantements sur Paris, English translation Paris Noir), and Giraud’s Le Vin des rues (1955). The three frequented Chez Fraysse on Rue de Seine in Saint-Germain-des-Prés with Doisneau, not far from Clébert’s other haunt Chez Moineau, the dirt-cheap refuge of bohemian youths and of Guy Debord, Michele Bernstein, Gil J. Wolman, Ivan Chtcheglov and the other members of the Lettrist International, and which was the subject of Ed van der Elsken’s photo-romain Love on the Left Bank (1956). Thus did Clébert attend both the last Surrealist meeting and some of the first gatherings of the Situationists.

For two years he was a reporter in Asia for Paris Match and France Soir.

== Provence and later life ==
Clébert retreated from urban life in 1956 to the mountainous Luberon region of Provence, in which he discovered abandoned stone villages, and took up residence there without running water or electricity, before moving in 1968 to Oppède-le-Vieux. The village had been a refuge for artists during the war, where Alexey Brodovitch owned an old mill occupied by his brother, and where Consuelo de Saint-Exupéry, widow of the aviator Antoine de Saint-Exupéry, was still resident. He spent the rest of his life there, dying on September 20, 2011.

He wrote thirty-three books and many were dedicated to the history and legends of his adopted Provence, the most influential of these being Les Tziganes (1962), a pioneering sociological study of Gypsies, one of the finest studies of the subject at the time based on both archival research and personal experience (although it has also seen criticism in recent years). The book was translated into English by Charles Duff in 1969. It was followed by Rêver de Provence – Côte d'Azur (1967), Guide de la Provence mystérieuse (1992) and a three volumes of the series Provence antique (vol. 1 in 1966, vol. 2 in 1970 and vol. 3 in 1992). He was awarded the Prix littéraire de Provence in 1988.

He published the novels L'Ermite in 1984, L'Alchimiste du Roi-Soleil in 1994 and L'Esprit des hauts lieux, in 2000. In 1996 he published Dictionnaire du Surréalisme.

== Bibliography ==
- 1952 : Paris insolite. Denoël. 1952. ISBN 978-2-917084-11-3., co-authored with Patrice Molinard (photographs), Reissued by Attila in 2009
- 1953 : La Vie sauvage. ASIN B0018G5FOG.
- 1955 : Le Blockhaus. ASIN B0018GCKJE.
- 1956 : Paris que j'aime. Sun. ASIN B0000DSD7B.
- 1958 : Provence insolite. ASIN B0014XQ6BO., co-author: Georges Glasberg, Pub. Éditions Grasset
- 1962 : Arthaud (ed.). Les Tziganes. ASIN B0000DLMFA., illustrated by 64 photographs, 18 drawings and 2 maps
- 1966 : Provence antique. Laffont. ASIN B0010V5VD4., 1 : des origines a la conquête romaine
- 1967 : Rêver de Provence – Côte d'Azur. Vilo. ASIN B0000DLUBH.
- 1968 : Histoire et guide de la France secrète. ASIN B0000DSMJN., co-author Aimé Michel, Encyclopédieplanéte
- 1970 : Provence antique, 2 : l'époque gallo-romaine. Laffont. ASIN B0000DOWVG.
- 1981 : Fort Chabrol (1899). Denoël. 1981. ISBN 978-2-207-22695-7.
- 1984 : Mémoire du Luberon. Herscher. 1984. ISBN 978-2-7335-0076-7.
- 1986 : La Provence de Pagnol. Edisud. 1986. ISBN 978-2-85744-376-6.
- 1986 : L'Ermite. Albin Michel. 1986. ISBN 978-2-226-02138-0.
- 1988 : Les Daudet, une famille bien française, 1840 1940. Presses de la Renaissance. 1988. ISBN 978-2-85616-454-9.
- 1992 : Guide de la Provence mystérieuse. Sand et Tchou. 1992. ISBN 978-2-7107-0359-4.
- 1992 : Guide de la France thermale. Horay. 1992. ISBN 978-2-7058-0024-6.
- 1992 : Provence antique, 3 : Aux temps des premiers chrétiens. 1992. ISBN 978-2-221-06761-1.
- 1993 : Provence. Éditions de La Martinière. 1993. ISBN 978-2-7324-2033-2.
- 1994 : L'Alchimiste du Roi-Soleil. Albin Michel. 1994. ISBN 978-2-226-06916-0.
- 1995 : La Durance. Rivières et vallées de France. Privat. 1995. ISBN 978-2-7089-9503-1.
- 1996 : Dictionnaire du Surréalisme. Seuil. 1996. ISBN 2-02-024588-4.
- 1996 : De Provence. Nathan. 1996. ISBN 978-2-09-284676-6.
- 1996 : Histoire de la fin du monde, de l'an mil a l'an 2000. Belfond. 1996. ISBN 978-2-7144-3137-0.
- 1998 : Vivre en Provence. Éditions de l'Aube. 1998. ISBN 978-2-87678-131-3.
- 1998 : Femmes d'artistes. Presses de la Renaissance. 1998. ISBN 978-2-85616-499-0.
- 1999 : La Littérature à Paris: L'histoire, les lieux, la vie littéraire. Larousse. 1999. ISBN 978-2-03-508004-2.
- 2000 : L'Esprit des hauts lieux: 80 sites de France. Albin Michel. ISBN 978-2-226-02700-9. genre=roman
- 2001 : Les Fêtes provençales. ISBN 978-2-7006-0246-3. co-author Josiane Aoun and Béatrice Tollu, Aubanel : collection Nature Cote Sud
- 2003 : Prophéties de Nostradamus : Les Centuries, texte intégral (1555–1568). Dervy. 2003. ISBN 978-2-84454-260-1.
- 2004 : Histoires et légendes de la Provence mystérieuse. Sand & Tchou. 2004. ISBN 978-2-7107-0362-4.
- 2006 : Herbier provençal. Provence. Rivages. 2006. ISBN 978-2-903059-64-4.
- 2007 : Marie Madeleine en Provence. Oxus Editions. 2007. ISBN 978-2-84898-096-6.

== Works in translation ==
- 1956 : (in English) The Paris I Love Text by Jean-Paul Clebert with photography by Patrice Molinard, with an introduction by Marcel Ayme, Tudor Publishing Company, New York
- 1958 : (in English) The Blockhouse, Avon Books
- 1963 : (in English) The Gypsies, Vista Books ASIN B0000CLPWG translated by Charles Duff
- 1997 : (in German) Der Untergang der Welt, Pub. Lübbe
- 2016 : (in English) Paris Vagabond (Paris insolite) Donald Nicholson-Smith (translator), with photography by Patrice Molinard, New York Review Books. ISBN 978-1-59017-957-4.

== Works in adaptation ==
In 1973, Clébert's novel The Blockhouse was adapted into a film of the same name, directed by Clive Rees, starring Peter Sellers and Charles Aznavour.
