= Alain Jessua =

French film director (1932–2017)

- Born: 16 January 1932; Paris, France
- Died: 30 November 2017 (aged 85); Évreux, France
- Occupations: Film director, screenwriter
- Years active: 1956–1997

Alain Jessua (16 January 1932 – 30 November 2017) was a French film director and screenwriter. He directed ten films between 1956 and 1997. He worked as assistant director for Jacques Becker on the set of Casque d'or, with Max Ophüls for Madame de... and Lola Montès and with Marcel Carné on Wasteland. Léon la lune his first short film won the influential Prix Jean Vigo in 1957. He directed first feature film in 1963 La vie à l'envers that won Best First Film at Venice Film Festival, in 1964.

His 1967 film Jeu de massacre was entered into the 1967 Cannes Film Festival, where it won the award for Best Screenplay. His 1979 film The Dogs was entered into the 11th Moscow International Film Festival. In 1984, Alain Jessua directed Frankenstein 90, inspired by Mary Shelley's book, with Eddy Mitchell in the role of the creature.

== Filmography ==
- Léon la lune (1956)
- La vie à l'envers (1964)
- Jeu de massacre (1967)
- Traitement de choc (1973)
- Armaguedon (1977)
- Les chiens (1979)
- Paradis pour tous (1982)
- Frankenstein 90 (1984)
- En toute innocence (1988)
- Les couleurs du diable (1997)
