= Quarantine (play) =

1922 play by F. Tennyson Jesse

- Edna Best and Owen Nares in Quarantine
- Original language: English
- Written by: F. Tennyson Jesse
- Subject: Elopement entanglement
- Genre: Comedy
- Setting: SS Angostura; Pigeon Island quarantine bungalow; Royal Hotel, Esmeralda

Premiere
- Date: June 6, 1922 (UK); December 16, 1924 (US)
- Place: Comedy Theatre (UK); Henry Miller's Theater (US)
- Directed by: J. E. Vedrenne (UK); Edgar Selwyn (US)
- Original run: 101 performances (UK); 151 performances (US)

Quarantine is a 1922 English play by F. Tennyson Jesse, later revised in 1924 by Edgar Selwyn for US production. It is a light comedy; in its original version it comprised four acts and seven scenes, with six settings and fifteen characters. The action of the play takes place over twelve days time. The story concerns a young lady who takes her married cousin's place to prevent her eloping with a famous explorer.

The play was first produced and staged by J. E. Vedrenne, with scenic design by Paul Gill, who also performed in a small part. Quarantine starred Owen Nares and Edna Best. It had a week-long tryout at Brighton before its West End premiere in early June 1922. Quarantine ran through to early September for over 100 performances, before going on tour.

North American rights to the play were taken up by producers Charles L. Wagner and Edgar Selwyn, with the latter revising and staging the US production. Settings were designed by Norman Bel Geddes. Quarantine, starring Helen Hayes and Sidney Blackmer, had tryouts in Washington, D.C. and Boston, before its Broadway premiere during December 1924. It ran through April 1925 for 151 performances.

The Selwyn version of Quarantine was adapted for a 1925 silent film titled Lovers in Quarantine.

== Characters ==
Aside from the two leads, characters are listed as printed in the original Comedy Theatre programme.

Lead

- Tony Blunt is a tall, handsome but jaded explorer who has an unwise attachment to a married woman.
- Dinah Partlett is seventeen, infatuated with Tony, and determined to keep her cousin from him.

Others

- Macintosh Josephs is Pamela's short and balding husband.
- Mr. Burroughs is also a passenger on the steamer.
- Mr. Dobson is a passenger on the SS Angostura.
- The Doctor is the steamer's overly cheerful medical officer.
- The Steward
- The Waiter is a Spaniard on Pigeon Island who serenades his love with a guitar.
- Silent Passenger is a passenger on the steamer with a talent for inopportune entrances.
- Cyrus P. Honks is an American reporter at the Royal Hotel on Esmeralda. (Note: This character was excised along with the entire fourth act from Edgar Selwyn's US version.)
- Pamela Josephs is Dinah's red-haired married cousin, who was going to elope with Tony.
- Lola de la Corte is a femme fatale on the steamer.
- Mrs. Burroughs is a gossipy deck chair passenger on the steamer.
- Miss Larpent is another talkative deck chair occupant.
- Pinsent is a respectable and disapproving ladies maid.

== Synopsis ==
This synopsis was compiled from the theatrical program and contemporaneous newspaper reviews.

The SS Angostura is sailing from Avonmouth to an island holiday destination. "Esmeralda is an island lying somewhere between the Azores and the Bahamas. It is sub-tropical, originally colonized by the Spanish, now nominally English, in reality thoroughly American". Aboard is the famous explorer Tony Blunt, who thinks he is eloping with the married Pamela Josephs. Their cover story is they are newlyweds; she wears a veil, supposedly out of modesty, but really to avoid recognition. However, the letter of assignation Tony sent to Pamela was intercepted by her young single cousin, Dinah Partlett. She has a crush on Tony and is determined to keep her cousin from adultery. So Dinah takes the cabin Tony reserved for Pamela and stays out of sight. Mrs. Burroughs and Miss Larpent note the shy "bride" has stayed in her cabin four days.

Exasperated by "Pamela" keeping her distance, Tony tears off her veil. He discovers the deception but compels Dinah to keep up the masquerade by pretending in public they really are married. This continues onto the Esmeralda quarantine station of Pigeon Island, where the cheerful Doctor explains they have been given the newlywed bungalow to co-habit. During the week-long quarantine the twin beds in the bungalow are both occupied, but it turns out that while Dinah slept in one bed, the other was taken by Pinsent. The other passengers in quarantine make appearances, particularly a silent fellow with a genius for awkward entrances. Finally Pamela catches up to Tony and Dinah, and through her acidic accusations prompts Tony to realize Dinah is far the better choice. They commit to each other for real on the verandah of the Royal Hotel on Esmeralda.

=== Scenes ===
Act I (Scene 1: Port promenade deck of ship. Fourth day of sailing.)
(Scene 2: Inside the ship's cabin.)
Act II (Scene 1: A bungalow on Pigeon Island.)
(Scene 2: Verandah of the bungalow. Evening)
(Scene 3: A room in the bungalow.)
Act III (Same room. A week later.)
Act IV (Verandah of the Royal Hotel, Esmeralda.)

== Original production ==
=== Background ===
An English author of novels, F. Tennyson Jesse had collaborated with polymath H. M. Harwood for three previous stage works, of which Billeted (1917) was the most popular. (Note: It was adapted for a 1919 American silent film titled The Misleading Widow.) Tennyson Jesse and Harwood were married in 1918, but did not publicly reveal it until December 1921. Quarantine was her first solo effort for the stage.

Quarantine was first announced in late April 1922, when producer J. E. Vedrenne chose it as the opening work for his multiyear lease of the Comedy Theatre. The theatre itself would undergo refurbishment prior to June 6, when Quarantine, starring Edna Best and Owen Nares, would premiere. The complete cast was announced by the end of May 1922. Paul Gill designed the sets, and also played the part of The Waiter.

=== Cast ===
Cast for the Brighton tryout and the original West End production.
| Role | Actor | Dates | Notes and sources |
|---|---|---|---|
| Tony Blunt | Owen Nares | May 29, 1922 - Jul 29, 1922 | Nares left to open in a new play, If Winter Comes, which he also co-produced. |
| Tony Blunt | A. E. Matthews | Jul 30, 1922 - Sep 02, 1922 | |
| Dinah Partlett | Edna Best | May 29, 1922 - Sep 02, 1922 | |
| Macintosh Josephs | Tom Reynolds | May 29, 1922 - Sep 02, 1922 | Reynolds also served as stage manager for this production. |
| Mr. Burroughs | Compton Coutts | May 29, 1922 - Sep 02, 1922 | |
| Mr. Dobson | Bruce Winston | May 29, 1922 - Sep 02, 1922 | |
| The Doctor | H. G. Stoker | May 29, 1922 - Sep 02, 1922 | A cousin of Bram Stoker, he commanded a Royal Australian Navy submarine during the Great War. |
| The Steward | Edward Mervyn | May 29, 1922 - Sep 02, 1922 | |
| The Waiter | Paul Gill | May 29, 1922 - Sep 02, 1922 | |
| The Silent Passenger | Stafford Hilliard | May 29, 1922 - Sep 02, 1922 | Hilliard had no lines but was credited by reviewers with a most effective performance. |
| Cyrus P. Honks | Ernest Leeman | May 29, 1922 - Sep 02, 1922 | |
| Pamela Josephs | Muriel Pope | May 29, 1922 - Sep 02, 1922 | |
| Lola de la Corte | Tonie Bruce | May 29, 1922 - Aug 30, 1922 | Bruce had to drop out of the cast for an appendectomy. |
| Lola de la Corte | TBD | Aug 31, 1922 - Sep 02, 1922 | |
| Mrs. Burroughs | Margaret Scudamore | May 29, 1922 - Sep 02, 1922 | |
| Miss Larpent | Christine Johnson | May 29, 1922 - Sep 02, 1922 | |
| Pinsent | Louise Hampton | May 29, 1922 - Sep 02, 1922 | |

=== Tryout ===
The production had a week-long tryout at the Theatre Royal in Brighton, starting on Monday, May 29, 1922. There were six evening performances and two matinees, finishing on Saturday, June 3, 1922.

=== West End premiere and reception ===
Edna Best and A. E. Matthews

Quarantine had its West End premiere at the Comedy Theatre on Tuesday, June 6, 1922. The critic for the Evening Standard called the play "bright, breezy, ingenious", and said the cast was "excellent" though Edna Best was "displayed to the utmost advantage" and Owen Nares was not. The reviewer for The Daily Sketch was less generous, saying Quarantine was "entirely lacking in any form of distinction" with the story having "more improbability than impropriety". Nevertheless, they felt it would be a success, and complimented the acting of Margaret Scudamore, Owen Nares, and Louise Hampton. Edna Best, though she had a "pert assurance", lacked "light or shade" in her performance.

The Daily Telegraph critic thought "the best things in Miss Tennyson Jesse's unpretentious and gay little piece are the steamer types.... who all show observation and malicious humor". Chief among these he judged was the Silent Passenger, whose final awkwardness allowed the play to end on a humorous rather than a sentimental note. The reviewer for The Guardian said the leads were unconvincing as a vamp and an explorer: "Neither Mr. Nares nor Miss Best convinced us that they would ever be much use outside of a tennis party". They also suggested the story was too tenuous for four acts and seven scenes, but was a "harmless and happy" entertainment.

At the end of July 1922, Owen Nares left to take up rehearsals for a new play in which he had a producing interest. A. E. Matthews replaced him as Tony Blunt for the remainder of the show's run.

=== West End closing ===
The production closed at the Comedy Theatre on Saturday, September 2, 1922. It began touring other parts of London the following week.

== Revised 1924 US version ==
Newspapers reported in October 1924 that Charles L. Wagner and Edgar Selwyn would jointly produce Quarantine. Selwyn revised the play by eliminating Act IV and the second scene of Act I, along with the character of the American reporter. Selwyn staged the play, while Norman Bel Geddes designed the settings, now reduced to just three.

Each co-producer provided a leading actor. Sidney Blackmer was under Charles L. Wagner's management, and Helen Hayes was made available by Selwyn, who had put her into Dancing Mothers then playing on Broadway. Others cast were Beryl Mercer as Pinsent, Bernard A. Reinold as the Doctor, Kay Laurell as Pamela Josephs, and Percy Ames as the Silent Passenger.

=== Tryouts ===
Quarantine had a week-long tryout at the Shubert-Belasco Theatre in Washington, D.C. starting November 17, 1924. Reviews were mixed, with Sidney Blackmer coming in for some severe criticism. The production then moved to Boston for a two-week tryout starting December 1, 1924, at the Selwyn Park Square Theatre, where the local reviewer said the play was "brightly written and most capably acted".

=== Broadway premiere and reception ===
The production had its Broadway premiere on December 16, 1924, at Henry Miller's Theater. The critic for The Brooklyn Daily Times was enthused about Helen Hayes and framed their recommendation to see the play solely on her presence. Arthur Pollock said in other hands the story would have played as loud farce, but the playwright "maneuvers it quietly... It is politely written, politely acted, politely staged". Burns Mantle likened the play to a "sub-deb type", with the heroine as "Bab out of school", referring to an earlier Helen Hayes character. He said the play was safe and sedate enough for any playgoer, but might disappoint those used to more provocative fare. Stark Young said Quarantine ran "towards amiable fiction. Last night it got nowhere entertainingly, said nothing engagingly, and ended in rounds of applause".

Vivian Martin took over from Helen Hayes as the female lead when the latter started rehearsals for the Theatre Guild's revival of Caesar and Cleopatra in late March 1925. Kay Laurell, who had hoped to take the female lead herself, resigned and was replaced as Pamela Josephs by Katherine Wilson.

=== Broadway closing ===
Quarantine closed at Henry Miller's Theater on Saturday, April 25, 1925, after 151 performances.

== Adaptations ==
=== Film ===
- Lovers in Quarantine (1925) - Movie critic Mildred Spain tacitly acknowledged that this silent film did not have much to do with the stage play Quarantine, but thought it highly enjoyable anyway. Made by Paramount Pictures, it was directed by Frank Tuttle, and starred Bebe Daniels and Harrison Ford, with Alfred Lunt, Eden Gray and Edna May Oliver.

== Bibliography ==
- Burns Mantle (ed). The Best Plays of 1924-25 and the Year Book of the Drama in America. Small, Maynard & Company, 1925.
