= Thin Line =

Thin Line may refer to:

- The Thin Line (novel), a 1951 crime novel by Edward Atiyah
- The Thin Line (1966 film), a film directed by Mikio Naruse
- The Thin Line (1980 film), an Israeli drama art film directed by Michal Bat-Adam
- The Thin Line (TV series), a 2008 Malaysian drama
- Thin Line (album), a 2016 album by country singer Billy Ray Cyrus
- "Thin Line", a song by Macklemore & Ryan Lewis from The Heist, 2012
- "Thin Line", a song by Reks from Rhythmatic Eternal King Supreme, 2011
