= Billeted (play) =

1917 play by F. Tennyson Jesse and H. M. Harwood

- Dennis Eadie and Iris Hoey
- Original language: English
- Written by: F. Tennyson Jesse and H. M. Harwood
- First publication: 1920
- Subject: Absent husband inconveniently reappears
- Genre: Comedy
- Setting: Morning room of the Manor House, Petworthy; August 1915

Premiere
- Date: August 21, 1917 (UK); December 25, 1917 (US)
- Place: Royalty Theatre (UK); The Playhouse (US)
- Directed by: J. E. Vedrenne (UK); Howard Lindsay (US)
- Original run: 240 performances (UK); 79 performances (US)

Billeted is a 1917 English play by F. Tennyson Jesse and H. M. Harwood. It is a comedy in three acts and one setting, with nine characters. The action of the play takes place over five days time. The story concerns a grass widow who fakes her husband's death only to have him reappear under another name. The title refers to the placement of military personnel in civilian homes when government housing is not available.

The play was first produced by J. E. Vedrenne and Dennis Eadie, with the former also staging it. Billeted starred Eadie and Iris Hoey. It had a West End premiere in August 1917 and ran through March 1918, before going on tour.

Margaret Anglin produced and starred in the US production of Billeted. It was staged by Howard Lindsay and the single setting was designed by Livingston Platt. Billeted, under the title of Lonely Soldiers, was performed as repertory by Anglin's company in Pittsburgh and Philadelphia from September through December 1917. Reverting to its original title for its Broadway premiere, Billeted ran through to early March 1918 for 79 performances.

Billeted was adapted for a 1919 American silent film titled The Misleading Widow, and had a limited engagement Off-Broadway revival in May 1922.

== Characters ==
Characters are listed in order of appearance within their scope.

Lead

- Elisabeth Taradine called Betty, is a grass-widow; pretty, extravagant, and financially ignorant.
- Peter Taradine is Betty's long-estranged husband, now going by the name Captain Rymill.

Supporting

- Rev. Ambrose Liptrott is an Anglican vicar, an unworldly bachelor with impish humor.
- Penelope Moon called Pen, is single, a level-headed and industrious live-in friend of Betty.
- Col. James Preedy is 50, a bachelor billeted on the Manor House, awaiting orders for overseas.

Featured

- Rose is the last servant in the Manor House, the others having gone for higher-paying munitions work.
- Miss Emmaline Liptrott is a humorless spinster who serves as her brother's housekeeper.
- Mr. McFarlane is a Scottish bank manager who tries to educate Betty about money.
- Mrs. Brace is Betty's excellent cook, upset at being hectored over unpaid supplier bills.

== Synopsis ==

Act I (Morning room of the Manor House. Afternoon in August 1915.) Rev. Liptrott and his sister visit the Manor House. Miss Liptrott chides Rose for missing a Bible Study meeting. Penelope Moon keeps the Liptrotts company while waiting for Betty to appear. She lets slip that Betty is only a grass widow. Miss Liptrott seizes on this as a way of prying Col. Preedy loose from the Manor House. She tells him that Betty's husband is still alive, so his presence at the Manor House is inappropriate. The Colonel was unaware of this, as also was Mr. McFarlane. He had hopes of recouping Betty's overdrafts from her husband's life insurance. Betty wants Col. Preedy to stay, for Penelope's sake. She sends a telegram to herself, announcing the death of Peter Taradine in Africa. But as she accepts the condolences of Col. Preedy, his adjutant, Capt. Rymill appears: it is her husband Peter, who enlisted in Egypt under a false name. Betty faints. (Curtain)

Act II (Same as Act I. The next morning at nine o'clock.) Peter and Penelope greet Col. Preedy and Betty at breakfast. Betty ducks out when Rose announces Rev. Liptrott, who has come to offer a memorial service. Preedy, who is wearing a mourning band, suggests Peter don one as well. Betty and Peter, alone at last, exchange recriminations. Peter asks why she waited until now to declare him dead. Betty mistakes Peter's admiration for Penelope, and later cautions Pen about him, without revealing his true identity. When Peter tries to telephone the Orderly Room, he finds the line is dead, cut off for non-payment. Penelope and he go off to the Post Office. Mrs. Brace remonstrates with Betty about the suppliers complaints of overdue payments. Preedy finds Betty crying afterwards, for her loss as he thinks. Penelope hears the Colonel consoling Betty, and snubs his suggestion of a walk. Penelope says that Peter went into the Post Office and was there a long time. Peter scolds Penelope for rejecting the Colonel's overtures. Peter explains to Betty why he enlisted under a false name. As he starts to go, he puts on a mourning armband, which Betty tears off. "Idiot", she says, as the telephone suddenly rings. (Curtain)

Act III (Same as Act I. Three days later, after dinner.) Betty learns that Peter told Penelope days ago he is married, but not to whom. Penelope tells Betty that she has trouble thinking of men as friends; to her, Peter is just that, a friend. Col. Preedy has received a telegram from the War Office. He and Capt. Rymill will be deploying overseas in two days. Rev. Liptrott calls, bringing a volume of Meditations for Betty. He and Peter engage in a discussion of love, women and marriage, with the Reverend asserting that a dose of Marcus Aurelius and Epictetus will make Betty more amenable to a religious life. Peter is startled when the Reverend declares extravagance is Betty's main virtue: she spends freely in giving love. When Peter demurs, he suggests "experience is the thief of wisdom". Peter lies to Col. Preedy, saying Betty expects him to propose to Penelope. Peter then sends Penelope outside to join the Colonel. Betty suggests a divorce, but Peter dismisses the idea. He explains there is no evidence for divoce, and he prefers reconciliation. They embrace, startling Penelope, who goes off with her new fiancé, the Colonel. As they kiss, Betty tells Peter that she has been so lonely... (Curtain)

== Original production ==
=== Background ===
An English author of novels, this was F. Tennyson Jesse's second stage collaboration with polymath H. M. Harwood. Their first co-written play, The Mask, was a one-act drama from 1913, based on Jesse's 1912 short story of the same title. As The Black Mask, it had a performance with four other playlets at the Princess Theatre in New York on September 27, 1913. Judged the best of the five works presented, it was described as "grim, stark drama, artistically played and produced". Tennyson Jesse and Harwood were married in 1918, but did not publicly reveal it until December 1921.

First notice of the new play came in July 1917, when co-producers J. E. Vedrenne and Dennis Eadie announced it for August 21 at the Royalty Theatre. The full cast was reported by August 11, 1917. The character of Penelope Moon was reportedly written for F. Tennyson Jesse's sister, Stella Jesse.

=== Cast ===
Cast for the original West End production.
Role	Actor	Dates	Notes and sources
Betty Taradine	Iris Hoey	August 21, 1917 - Mar 23, 1918	
Peter Taradine	Dennis Eadie	August 21, 1917 - Mar 23, 1918	
Rev. Liptrott	Lawrence Hanray	August 21, 1917 - Mar 23, 1918	
Penelope Moon	Stella Jesse	August 21, 1917 - Mar 23, 1918	This was the playwright's sister.
Col. Preedy	Dawson Milward	August 21, 1917 - Mar 23, 1918	This actor's credits for Billeted had his name as "Milward", not "Millward".
Rose	Katharine Duncombe	August 21, 1917 - Mar 23, 1918	
Miss Liptrott	Gertrude Sterroll	August 21, 1917 - Mar 23, 1918	
Mr. McFarlane	George Howard	August 21, 1917 - Mar 23, 1918	
Mrs. Brace	Blanche Stanley	August 21, 1917 - Mar 23, 1918	

=== West End premiere and reception ===

Billeted had its West End premiere at the Royalty Theatre on August 21, 1917. The reviewer for the Evening Standard thought the playwrights would have done better to produce the fake telegram at the beginning of the first act rather the end, but still judged "there are amusing passages in the play and a clever company to make the best of them". The Daily Telegraphs critic expressed surprise that a serious novelist like F. Tennyson Jesse was co-author of so light an entertainment, all clever dialogue and no story, but nevertheless "very good stuff" and well-received. The same sentiments were held by The Times reviewer, who went even farther in saying what little individuality the play contained "reveals the touch of that clever playwright" H. M. Harwood. They judged the performances of Stella Jesse and Dawson Milward were most promising, while Iris Hoey was not quite making full use of her character's potential.

=== West End closing ===
The production closed at the Royalty Theatre on Saturday, March 23, 1918, after 240 performances. The production then started on tour beginning at the Pleasure Gardens Theatre in Folkestone.

== US production ==
Actor-manager Margaret Anglin added Billeted to her company's repertory within a month of its West End premiere. As Lonely Soldiers, the Anglin Company production gave a week-long performance at the Nixon Theatre in Pittsburgh, starting September 16, 1917. Charles M. Bregg noted the title confusion, as Billeted, Doing Her Bit, and Lonesome Soldiers appeared in local newspapers before Lonely Soldiers was chosen. He thought the original title was fine for London, but would be unfamiliar to American audiences. (Note: Billeting or Quartering was one of the Intolerable Acts that precipitated the American Revolutionary War, and was prohibited in peacetime by the Third Amendment to the United States Constitution.) Bregg judged the play amusing and the acting quite in line with the characters sketched. He referenced a line by the servant Rose, played as an Irishwoman in this production, pertaining to American soldiers, which was not in the published play.

Lonely Soldiers was performed by the Anglin Company at the Little Theatre in Philadelphia starting October 18, 1917, and ran through to November 17, 1918. The time span of the play's action had been reduced from five to two days, by setting Act III during the evening of the same day as Act II. Howard Lindsay, who played bank manager Mr. McFarlane, staged the play.

=== Broadway premiere and reception ===
The production, now back under the original name, had its Broadway premiere on December 25, 1917, at the Playhouse Theatre. As with earlier engagements, Anglin gave herself top billing in advertising, the title of the play being displayed in a significantly smaller font size. The New York Times critic said Billeted had some "clever dialogue" but also dull and silly stretches, and was not a "deft play technically".

After three weeks at the Playhouse Theatre, the production of Billeted closed on Saturday, January 12, 1918, and reopened on Monday, January 14, 1918 at the Fulton Theatre.

Billeted closed at the Fulton Theatre on Saturday, March 2, 1918, after 79 performances.

== Revival ==
The original UK version of Billeted had a revival at the Greenwich Village Theatre starting May 9, 1922. It was produced and staged by Grace Griswold, the director of the just formed Comedy Company, which performed it. The revival starred Lois Bolton and H. Langdon Bruce, with Lumsden Hare and Selena Royle in support, and Kate Mayhew in a cameo role. Arthur Pollock said it was capably acted but with little vitality, "which is about what the play itself deserves". The production did well enough to move to the larger Frazee Theatre starting on May 22, 1922.

== Adaptations ==
=== Film ===
- The Misleading Widow (1919) -

== Bibliography ==
- F. Tennyson Jesse and H. M. Harwood. Billeted: A Comedy in Three Acts. Samuel French, Ltd., 1920.
