= The Misleading Widow =

1919 film by John S. Robertson

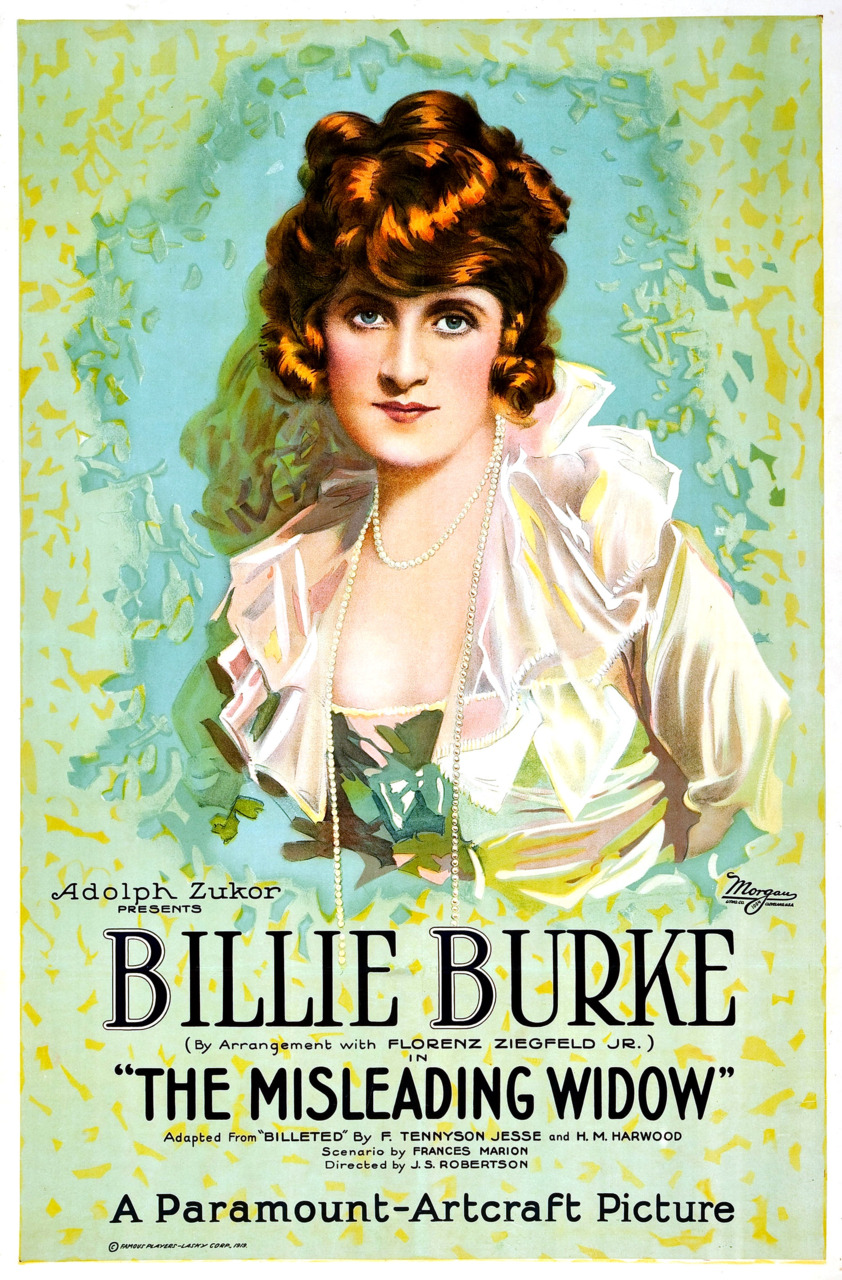
- Film poster
- Directed by: John S. Robertson
- Written by: Frances Marion (scenario)
- Based on: Billeted by F. Tennyson Jesse and H. M. Harwood
- Produced by: Adolph Zukor; Jesse L. Lasky
- Starring: Billie Burke
- Cinematography: Roy Overbaugh
- Production company: Famous Players–Lasky
- Distributed by: Paramount Pictures/Artcraft
- Release dates: July 27, 1919 (Los Angeles); August 31, 1919 (New York City); September 7, 1919 (U.S.)
- Running time: 5 reels
- Country: United States
- Languages: Silent film (English intertitles)

The Misleading Widow (1919) is a silent film comedy directed by John S. Robertson and starring Billie Burke. The film is based on the play Billeted by F. Tennyson Jesse and H. M. Harwood and was produced by Famous Players–Lasky and distributed by Paramount Pictures.

As it is not known whether the film currently survives, it is likely that it, similar to most of Burke's silent films, is a lost film.

== Plot ==
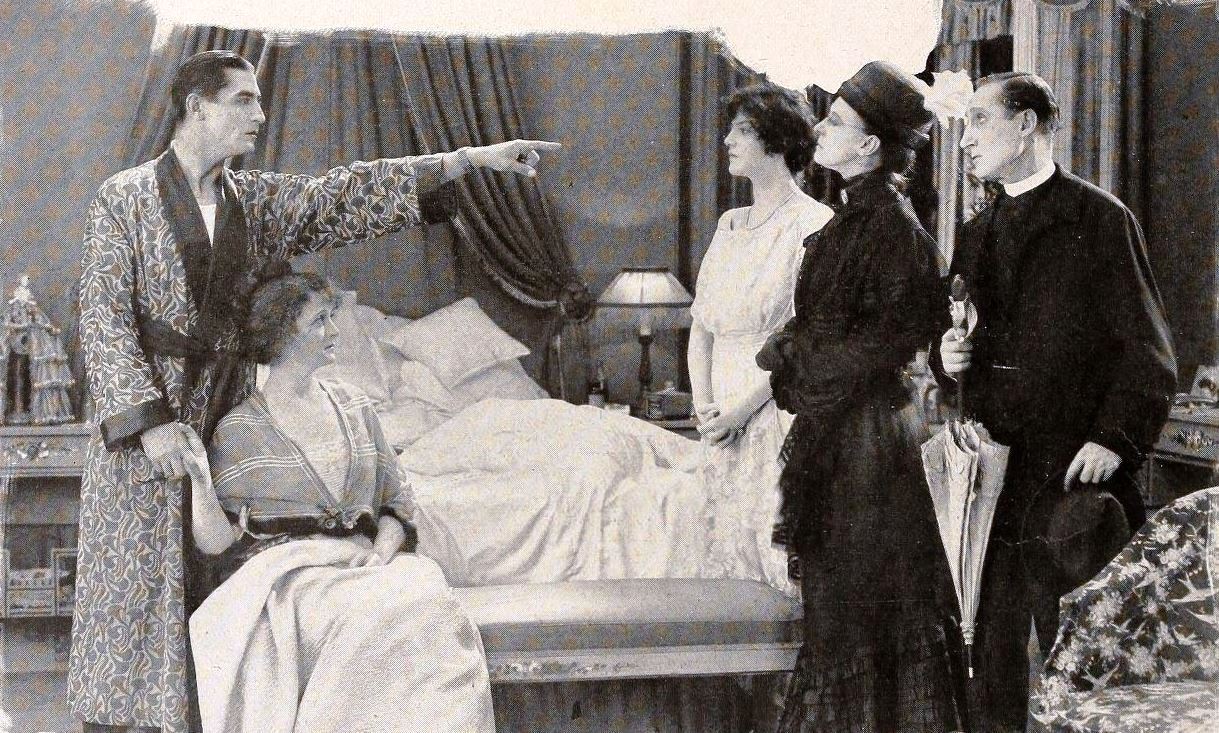
Film still with James Crane, Billie Burke, Madelyn Clare, Mrs. Priestly Morrison, and Fred Hearn

As summarized in an adaptation published in the September 1919 issue of Shadowlands, Betty Taradine, who lives in a British village near an army base, was abandoned by her husband for her spendthrift ways. She reports that he is dead to obtain insurance money. Later, British officer Captain Peter Rymill is assigned to be billeted at her house, but he turns out to be her husband living under an assumed name. There are various romantic triangles involving other villagers, and the identity of the missing husband and existence of the marriage is revealed after a dinner with the guests gathered in the widow's bedroom.

The setting of the film is in England as the Third Amendment to the United States Constitution prohibits the quartering of soldiers in a person's home without their consent.

== Cast ==
- Billie Burke - Betty Taradine
- James Crane - Captain Peter Rymill
- Frank R. Mills - Colonel Preedy (*this Frank Mills, a stage actor died 1921)
- Madelyn Clare - Penelope Moon (billed Madeline Clare)
- Fred Hearn - Reverend Ambrose Liptrott
- Mrs. Priestly Morrison - Tabitha Liptrott (*aka Mary Florence Horne)
- Fred Esmelton - Mr. MacFarland
- Dorothy Walters - Rose

== See also ==
- List of lost films
