= The Man in Possession =

1931 film

- Directed by: Sam Wood (uncredited)
- Written by: Sarah Y. Mason (adaptation and additional dialogue); P. G. Wodehouse (additional dialogue)
- Based on: The Man in Possession; 1930 play by H. M. Harwood
- Produced by: Sam Wood; Harry Rapf (uncredited)
- Starring: Robert Montgomery; Charlotte Greenwood; Irene Purcell; C. Aubrey Smith
- Cinematography: Oliver T. Marsh
- Edited by: Ben Lewis
- Production company: Metro-Goldwyn-Mayer
- Distributed by: Loew's Inc.
- Release date: July 4, 1931
- Running time: 84 minutes
- Country: United States
- Language: English

Not to be confused with the 1937 film Personal Property (also based on the Harwood play), whose alternate title is The Man in Possession.

The Man in Possession is a 1931 American pre-Code romantic comedy film starring Robert Montgomery, Charlotte Greenwood, Irene Purcell, and C. Aubrey Smith, based on the play of the same name by H. M. Harwood. The black sheep of a family finds himself falling in love with the wealthy woman his brother is seeking to marry.

Unusually, this film has no director credit; producer Sam Wood was the director. This film also has a rare screenwriting credit ("additional dialogue") for novelist and short story writer P.G. Wodehouse. Wodehouse worked in Hollywood in 1930 and 1931, and caused a minor furor when he cheerfully (and somewhat amazedly) revealed in an interview how much he was paid for his position as a writer at MGM ($2000/week, at a time when the median US wage was $1400/year), and how little actual work he was required to do.

== Plot ==
Raymond Dabney returns to a mixed reaction from his upper middle-class family in London after serving a sentence at HM Prison Wormwood Scrubs for stealing a motorcar. His mother and the family servant are delighted to see him, but his father and brother Claude are less so. His father is particularly disappointed in him, having sent him to Cambridge. The two men offer him £500 to leave the country and never return; it seems Claude is engaged to a rich widow, and they are anxious to avoid any scandal that might endanger the marriage. Raymond turns it down, however, and departs the same day.

He obtains work as a sheriff's officer, helping a bailiff serve a writ on Crystal Wetherby, a woman in serious debt, taking possession of her property. The bailiff instructs him to remain in Crystal's mansion to keep an eye on the seized property until the next day, but also to provide any reasonable assistance to the woman. Crystal and her sole remaining servant, Clara, have him take the place of the departed butler.

Then Crystal mentions the name of her fiancé, none other than Claude Dabney. Claude is bringing his parents to dinner that night to meet her. The situation is awkward for all the Dabneys. Meanwhile, Crystal's admirer, the wealthy and generous (if disreputable) Sir Charles Cartwright, shows up. Crystal has carefully kept the news of her engagement from him. She manages to get the jealous man to leave without him meeting her dinner guests. Before Claude leaves, he informs Crystal that her butler has a crooked past (without revealing they are brothers), but she refuses to discharge him (without revealing he is actually in possession of the premises). To complicate matters even further, that night Raymond seduces a willing Crystal.

The next morning, Raymond prepares Crystal's breakfast in bed, though Clara insists on taking it up to her. When Crystal removes the cover, she sees that the bacon has been arranged to spell the word "LOVE". Clara picks up Crystal's undergarments scattered around the room, noting that her chemise is torn. Crystal does not correct Clara's incredulous assumption that it was Claude who ripped it.

Raymond then proceeds to sabotage Crystal's other relationships. When Sir Charles arrives, Raymond informs him of her engagement, causing the latter to tear up a check for £1000 he was about to give her. Claude then offers his brother £1000 to leave England forever; Raymond insists on being paid an additional £200 for immediate expenses. Then Raymond shows Claude the writ, proving Crystal is not the wealthy woman she pretends to be. Panic-stricken, Claude tells Raymond to reveal to her that they are brothers (in order to break off the engagement without being sued for breach of promise) and hastily departs. Sir Charles returns, having discovered that his love for Crystal is too strong, but she declines his proposal of marriage.

When the bailiff shows up, Raymond pays off the outstanding debt, collects his wages, and informs Crystal that they can be married on the ship taking them to a fresh start in a new country. She reminds him of her past, but he is undeterred. She then happily embraces him.

== Cast ==
- Robert Montgomery as Raymond Dabney
- Charlotte Greenwood as Clara
- Irene Purcell as Crystal Wetherby
- C. Aubrey Smith as Mr. Dabney
- Beryl Mercer as Mrs. Dabney
- Reginald Owen as Claude Dabney. Owen played the same character in the 1937 adaptation of the play, Personal Property.
- Alan Mowbray as Sir Charles Cartwright
- Maude Eburne as Esther
- Forrester Harvey as the Bailiff. Harvey played the same character in Personal Property.
- Yorke Sherwood as the Butcher
