= Sondheim Theatre =

West End theatre in London

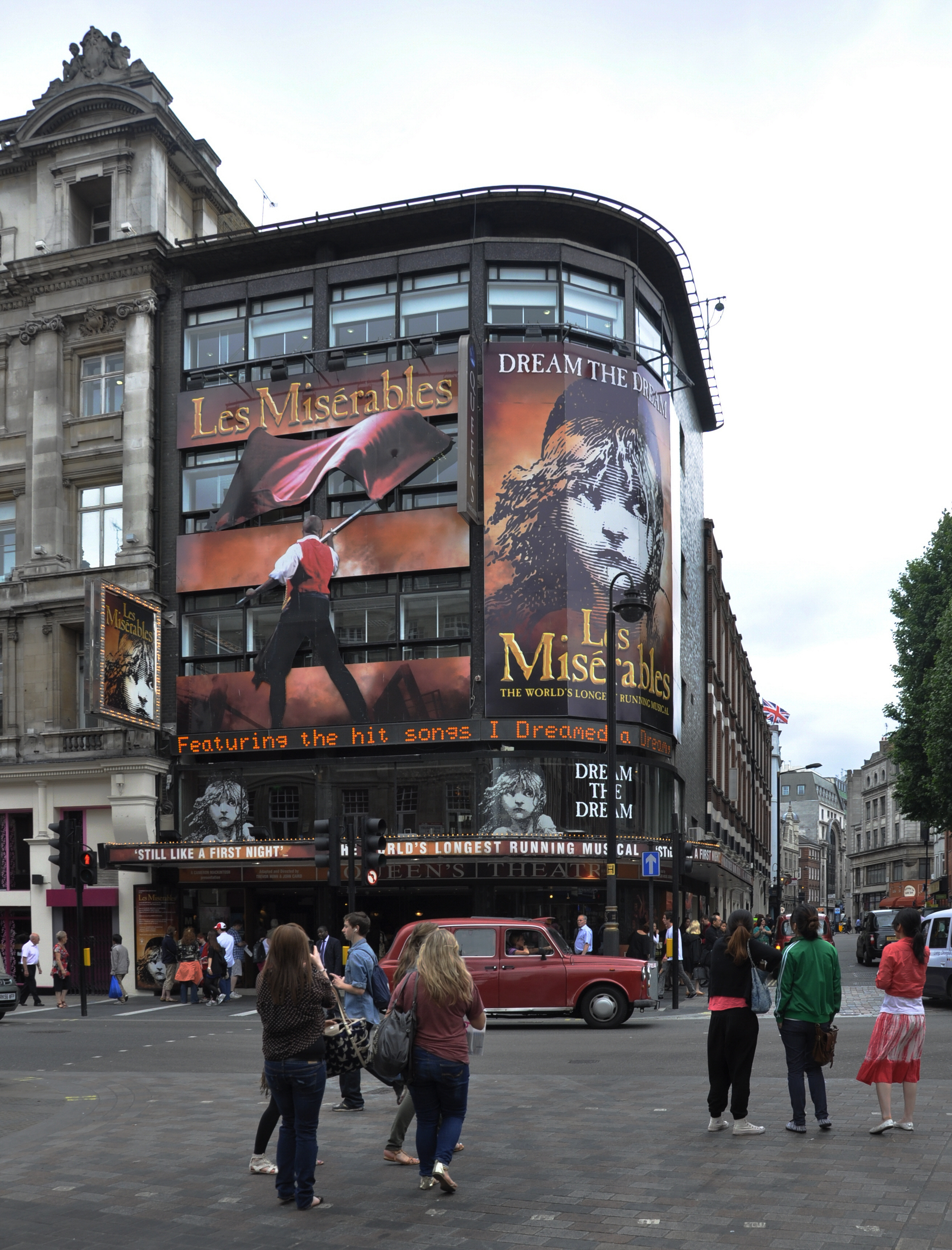
- The Sondheim Theatre in 2011 (then the Queen's), showing Les Misérables
- Interactive map of Sondheim Theatre
- Address: Shaftesbury Avenue; London, WC2; United Kingdom
- Coordinates: 51.511944°N 0.132778°W
- Owner: Delfont Mackintosh Theatres
- Capacity: 1137 on 3 levels
- Designation: Grade II
- Production: Les Misérables
- Public transit: Leicester Square; Piccadilly Circus

Website
- sondheimtheatre.co.uk

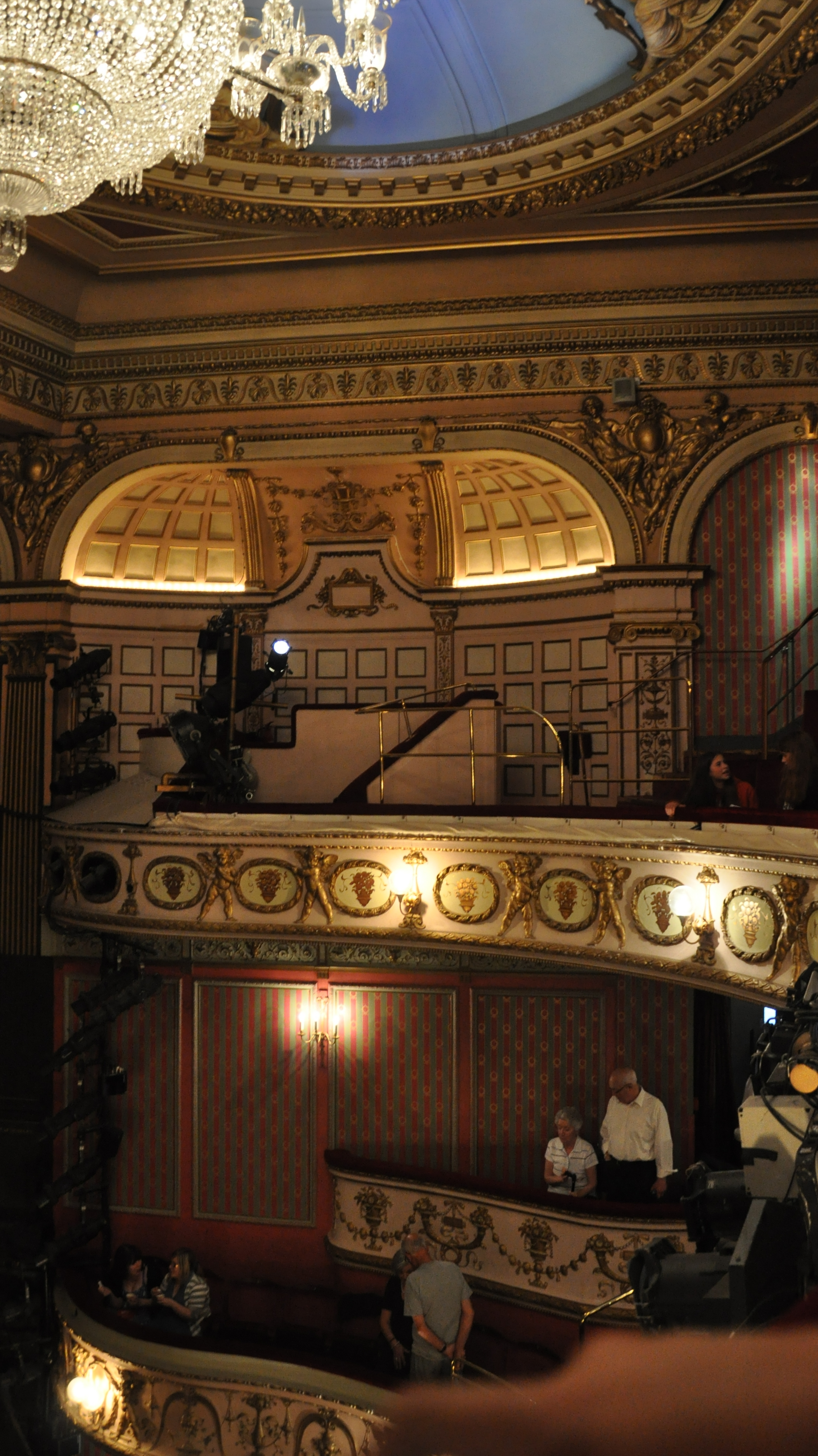
Auditorium prior to the 2019 refurbishment

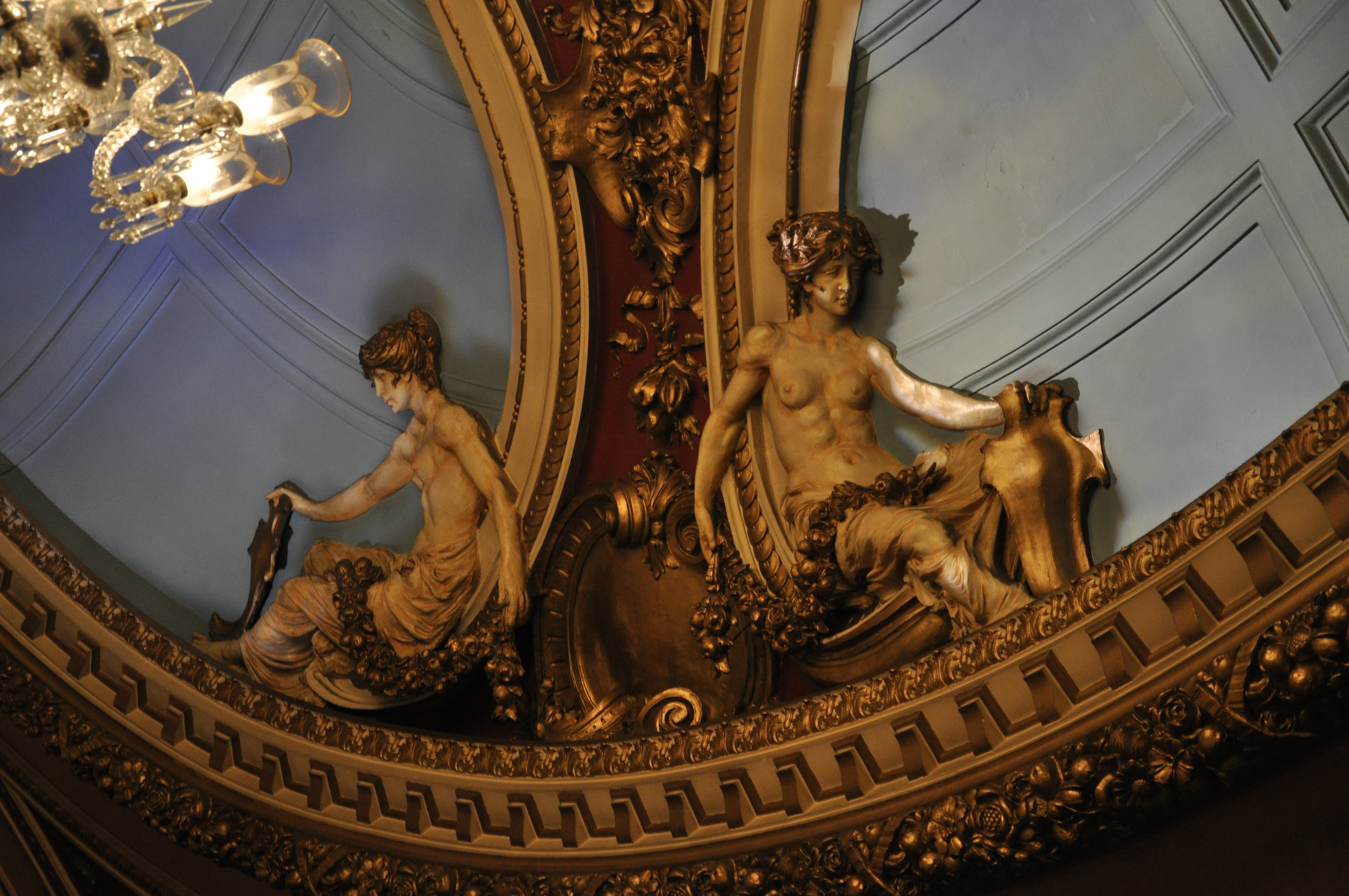
Auditorium, ceiling detail prior to the refurbishment

The Sondheim Theatre (formerly the Queen's Theatre) is a West End theatre located in Shaftesbury Avenue on the corner of Wardour Street in the City of Westminster, London. It opened as the Queen's Theatre on 8 October 1907, as a twin to the neighbouring Hicks Theatre (now the Gielgud Theatre) which had opened ten months earlier. Both theatres were designed by W. G. R. Sprague. The theatre was Grade II listed by English Heritage in June 1972.

In 2019 the theatre's name was changed from the Queen's to the Sondheim Theatre (after Stephen Sondheim) after a 20-week refurbishment. The theatre reopened on 18 December 2019.

== History ==
The original plan was to name the venue the Central Theatre. However, after lengthy debate, it was named the Queen's Theatre and a portrait of Queen Alexandra was hung in the foyer.

The first production at the Queen's Theatre was a comedy by Madeleine Lucette Ryley called The Sugar Bowl. Although it was poorly received and ran for only 36 performances, the theatre received glowing reviews. The Stage on 10 October 1907 described the theatre as:

A two-tier house, the Queen's holds about 1200 persons, representing some £300 in money. The colour scheme of the walls and roof is white and gold, while green is the hue of the carpets, hangings and upholstery, and of the very charming velvet tableau curtain. From a spacious and lofty entrance-hall, with passages leading down into the stalls, one ascends by a handsome marble staircase to the dress circle, which runs out over the pit; and there is a fine and roomy saloon at the top. Mr Vedrenne makes a point that 7/6 will be charged for seats in the first three rows only of the dress circle, while but 5/- will be the price of the remaining eight rows, also unreserved, in which evening dress will be optional. On the second tier of the Queen's, which is in the Old Italian Renaissance style and in the building of which the cantilever principle has been adopted, are the upper circle and the shilling gallery. The auditorium is lighted up agreeably with electric lamps and an electrolier, and ample refreshment room and other accommodation will be found to have been provided

In September 1940, a German bomb landed directly on the theatre, destroying the facade and lobby areas. The production at the time was Daphne du Maurier's Rebecca starring Celia Johnson, Owen Nares and Margaret Rutherford. The theatre remained closed until, almost 20 years later, a £250,000 restoration was completed by Westwood Sons & Partners. The auditorium retained its Edwardian decor, while the lobbies and exterior were rebuilt in a modern style. The reconstructed theatre opened on 8 July 1959 with John Gielgud's solo performance in Shakespeare speeches and sonnets, Ages of Man.

From April 2004 to July 2019, the theatre played host to Cameron Mackintosh's production of Les Misérables which transferred after 18 years at the nearby Palace Theatre. The musical celebrated its 20th anniversary at the venue on 8 October 2005, and overtook Cats as the West End's longest-running musical of all time a year later on 8 October 2006.

== 2019 Refurbishment ==
In 2019, Cameron Mackintosh announced that the original production of Les Misérables would close on 13 July 2019 while the theatre underwent a £13.8 million restoration, but would return in a new production from 18 December 2019, when the Queen's Theatre would be renamed as the Sondheim Theatre in honour of composer and lyricist Stephen Sondheim.

The theatre was extensively refurbished during the 20-week period. The Edwardian auditorium was recreated from the 1950s reconstruction with the addition of a curved rail and new boxes at dress circle level, named after Maggie Smith and Judi Dench. Overhangs and ceilings on each tier were also redecorated with a recurring Sprague-inspired cherub design in carved plaster and "fifteen colours and seven shades of gold". In total, approximately 70% of the plastering in the building was redone and a new, custom-made chandelier was hung.

The stage was lowered 30cm to be closer to the audience, and the famous revolving stage used in Les Misérables was also notably removed. 32 additional toilets were installed in a void space next door to the theatre. Additional space on every floor from the basement up was also reclaimed from a former electricity substation leased to the electric board in 1907. This allowed for more space on stage as well as additional dressing rooms on several floors, now fitted with showers. Finally, new seating was installed to improve audience comfort and sight-lines.

Following completion, the Sondheim Theatre re-opened on 16 January 2020 for its first performance of Les Miserables in the 2009 touring staging.

== Recent and present productions ==
- The Hobbit (28 November 2001 – 9 February 2002) by Glyn Robbins from J. R. R. Tolkien's book
- Mysteries (26 February 2002 – 18 May 2002) adaptation by Speir Opera
- Umoja: The Spirit of Togetherness (18 June 2002 – 31 August 2002) by Todd Twala, Thenbi Nyandeni and Ian von Memerty
- Contact (23 October 2002 – 10 May 2003) by Susan Stroman and John Weildman
- The Rocky Horror Show (23 June 2003 – 5 July 2003) by Richard O'Brien, starring Jonathan Wilkes and John Stalker
- Cyberjam (23 September 2003 – 3 January 2004)
- The RSC's The Taming of the Shrew (15 January 2004 – 6 March 2004) by William Shakespeare
- The RSC's The Tamer Tamed (22 January 2004 – 6 March 2004) by John Fletcher
- Les Misérables (12 April 2004 — 13 July 2019, 18 December 2019 –) by Alain Boublil and Claude-Michel Schönberg
- Les Misérables - The Staged Concert (5 December 2020 - 28 February 2021)
