= Personal property (disambiguation) =

Personal property is a type of property.

Personal property may also refer to:

- Personal Property (film), a 1937 romantic comedy film
- "Personal Property" (song), a 1992 rock song by Def Leppard
