= A Pin to See the Peepshow =

1934 novel by F. Tennyson Jesse

- First edition (US)
- Author: F. Tennyson Jesse
- Audio read by: Clare Francis
- Language: English
- Set in: London, 1913–1927
- Publisher: Heinemann (UK); Doubleday Doran (US)
- Publication date: September 1934
- Publication place: United Kingdom
- Media type: Print: hardback
- Dewey Decimal: 823.912
- LC Class: PZ3 .J492 .E57
- Preceded by: The Lacquer Lady
- Followed by: Act of God

Author F. Tennyson Jesse, photographed before 1922

A Pin to See the Peepshow is a 1934 novel by F. Tennyson Jesse, based on the 1922 Thompson–Bywaters murder case.

== Plot ==
Julia Almond grows up in suburban poverty in Edwardian London. She longs for a better life but makes an ill-advised marriage during the First World War.

== Reception ==
Sarah Waters has praised A Pin to See the Peepshow, writing "rarely, it seemed to me, had I been plunged by a piece of fiction into an emotional world so vivid, so complete, so convincingly untidy."

== Adaptations ==
A Pin to See the Peepshow was adapted into a play by Jesse and H. M. Harwood in 1951. It was refused a licence by the Lord Chamberlain and so premiered at a private venue in London: the Peter Cotes production was at the New Boltons Theatre Club. In 1953 it showed at the Playhouse Theatre, Broadway.

In 1973, it was adapted into a four-part TV series by the BBC, written by Elaine Morgan and starring Francesca Annis.

In 2007, it was made into a short radio drama on BBC Radio 4 by Scott Cherry.
