= Harry Chapman Ford =

American playwright and author

- Born: Baltimore, Maryland, United States
- Died: May 1938; Rutherford, New Jersey, United States
- Occupations: Playwright, Novelist
- Notable work: Anna Ascends (play), Eve's Leaves (play), Ebb Tide (novel)

Harry Chapman Ford was a playwright and novelist in the United States. Two of his plays and one of his novels were adapted to film.

== Early life ==
Henry Chapman Ford was born in Baltimore, Maryland. His mother was actress Blanche Chapman. His father was Henry Clay Ford, owner of Ford's Theatre. He had two brothers, Frank A. and George D.

== Career ==
Two of Ford's plays and one of his books were made into films. He was a stage director for theaters, and toured internationally with the theater adaptation of The Garden of Allah. He directed Viola Allen.

== Later life and death ==
Ford never married. He died in May 1938 at his home in Rutherford, New Jersey of a coronary thrombosis, outlived by his two brothers and mother.

== Theater ==
- Anna Ascends (1920)
- Eve's Leaves (1925)
- Ebb Tide (1931)

== Filmography ==
- Anna Ascends (1922)
- Eve's Leaves (1926) adapted by Paul Sloane from Ford's 1925 play of the same name
- Shadow of the Law (1926) adapted by Leah Baird and Grover Jones from Ford's novel Two Gates
