= Forrester Harvey =

Irish film actor (1884–1945)

- Born: 27 June 1884; County Cork, Ireland
- Died: 14 December 1945 (aged 61); Laguna Beach, California, U.S.
- Resting place: County Cork, Ireland
- Occupation: Actor
- Years active: 1922–1945

Forrester Harvey (27 June 1884 – 14 December 1945) was an Irish film actor.

== Career ==
From 1922 until his death year Harvey appeared in more than 115 films. He was credited for about two-thirds of his film appearances, but some of his roles were uncredited. The burly actor with a mustache mostly played comic supporting roles, often as an innkeeper. His best-known role was Beamish in the first two Tarzan films starring Johnny Weissmuller. Together with Claude Rains, he played in The Invisible Man, as a tavern owner and husband of a hysterical Una O'Connor, and in The Wolf Man. He appeared in two films for Alfred Hitchcock, first in his British silent film The Ring (1927), later in Hitchcock's Hollywood debut Rebecca (1940). He also played alongside Laurel and Hardy in their feature film A Chump at Oxford (1940). A number of reference works incorrectly identify him as having played Little Maria's father in Frankenstein.

== Death ==
Harvey died on 14 December 1945, at Laguna Beach, California, after suffering a stroke. His remains are interred at Sunnyside Cemetery in Long Beach, California, but his grave remains unmarked.

== Selected filmography ==
- The Lilac Sunbonnet (1922) as Jock Gordon
- Somebody's Darling (1925) as Oliver Jordan
- Nell Gwyn (1926) as Charles Hart
- If Youth But Knew (1926) as Amos
- The Ring (1927) as The Promoter
- The Flag Lieutenant (1927) as Dusty Miller
- The White Sheik (1928) as Pat
- Moulin Rouge (1928) as Tourist (uncredited)
- Toni (1928) as Watts
- Glorious Youth (1928) as Simmons
- Spangles (1928) as Watty
- Ringing the Changes (1929) as Steve Blower
- The Devil to Pay! (1930) as Taxi Driver (uncredited)
- A Tailor Made Man (1931) as Pomeroy
- The Man in Possession (1931) as A Bailiff
- Chances (1931) as Joe - News Vendor (uncredited)
- Guilty Hands (1931) as Spencer Wilson
- Devotion (1931) as Gas Inspector (uncredited)
- Lovers Courageous (1932) as Fisherman (uncredited)
- Shanghai Express (1932) as Peiping Ticket Agent (uncredited)
- Sky Devils (1932) as Innkeeper
- The Wet Parade (1932) as Mr. Fortesque
- Tarzan the Ape Man (1932) as Beamish
- But the Flesh Is Weak (1932) as Gooch
- Mystery Ranch (1932) as Artie Brower
- Those We Love (1932) as Jake
- Smilin' Through (1932) as Orderly
- Kongo (1932) as Cookie
- Red Dust (1932) as Captain Limey
- Destination Unknown (1933) as Ring
- The Eagle and the Hawk (1933) as Hogan
- Cocktail Hour (1933) as Barfly (uncredited)
- Midnight Club (1933) as Thomas Roberts
- Blind Adventure (1933) as Coffee Shop Owner
- Lady for a Day (1933) as Oscar, Hotel Employee with letter (uncredited)
- The Invisible Man (1933) as Herbert Hall
- Man of Two Worlds (1934) as Tim
- You Can't Buy Everything (1934) as Tramp in Park (uncredited)
- The Mystery of Mr. X (1934) as Joseph Horatio Palmer
- Tarzan and His Mate (1934) as Beamish
- Great Expectations (1934) as Uncle Pumblechook
- Menace (1934) as Wilcox
- The Painted Veil (1934) as Waddington
- Broadway Bill (1934) as Bradshaw (uncredited)
- Limehouse Blues (1934) as McDonald (uncredited)
- Forsaking All Others (1934) (scenes deleted)
- The Best Man Wins (1935) as Harry
- The Gilded Lily (1935) as Hugo / Innkeeper
- The Right to Live (1935) as English Bobby (uncredited)
- The Mystery of Edwin Drood (1935) as Durdles
- The Woman in Red (1935) as Mooney
- Vagabond Lady (1935) as Corky Nye
- China Seas (1935) as Chief Steward Ted Gary (uncredited)
- Jalna (1935) as Rags, the Butler-Chauffeur
- Without Regret (1935) as Police Surgeon (uncredited)
- The Perfect Gentleman (1935) as Wally Baxton
- A Tale of Two Cities (1935) as Joe (uncredited)
- Captain Blood (1935) as Honesty Nuttall
- Three Live Ghosts (1936) as The Paymaster (uncredited)
- Love Before Breakfast (1936) as Chief Steward
- Petticoat Fever (1936) as Scotty
- Trouble for Two (1936) as Hotel Waiter (uncredited)
- The Return of Sophie Lang (1936) as Deck Steward (uncredited)
- Suzy (1936) as Counter Man (uncredited)
- Lloyd's of London (1936) as Percival Potts
- White Hunter (1936) as Pembrooke
- Personal Property (1937) as Herbert Jenkins, Bailiff
- The Prince and the Pauper (1937) as Meaty Man
- Souls at Sea (1937) as Pub Proprietor (uncredited)
- The Man Who Cried Wolff (1937) as Jocko
- Bulldog Drummond Comes Back (1937) as Barman/Landlord (uncredited)
- Fight for Your Lady (1937) as Referee
- Thoroughbreds Don't Cry (1937) as Wilkins
- Bulldog Drummond's Peril (1938) as Bus Garage Man (uncredited)
- Kidnapped (1938) as Innkeeper
- Bulldog Drummond in Africa (1938) as Constable Jenkins (uncredited)
- Mysterious Mr. Moto (1938) as George Higgins
- Arrest Bulldog Drummond (1938) as Constable Severn—Outside Gannett House (uncredited)
- A Christmas Carol (1938) as Old Fezziwig (uncredited)
- Sweethearts (1938) as Tailor's Assistant (uncredited)
- I'm from Missouri (1939) as Customs Inspector (uncredited)
- Bulldog Drummond's Secret Police (1939) as Professor Downie
- Let Us Live (1939) as Death Row Inmate Asking for His Music (uncredited)
- The Lady's from Kentucky (1939) as Nonny Watkins
- The Witness Vanishes (1939) as Allistair McNab
- The Private Lives of Elizabeth and Essex (1939) Bit Part (uncredited)
- Raffles (1939) as Umpire (uncredited)
- The Invisible Man Returns (1940) as Ben Jenkins
- A Chump at Oxford (1940) as Meredith
- Rebecca (1940) as Chalcroft
- On Their Own (1940) as Mr. Pim
- Tom Brown's School Days (1940) as Sam. the Coachman (uncredited)
- Earl of Puddlestone (1940) as Tittington
- Little Nellie Kelly (1940) as Moriarity
- Free and Easy (1941) as Briggs (Landlord)
- Meet John Doe (1941) as Bum (uncredited)
- Scotland Yard (1941) as Air Raid Warden (uncredited)
- Dr. Jekyll and Mr. Hyde (1941) as Old Prouty
- The Feminine Touch (1941) (scenes deleted)
- Mercy Island (1941) as Captain Lowe
- The Wolf Man (1941) as Twiddle
- This Above All (1942) as Proprietor (uncredited)
- Mrs. Miniver (1942) as Mr. Huggins (uncredited)
- Random Harvest (1942) as Cabby (uncredited)
- The Mysterious Doctor (1943) as Hugh Penhryn
- The Lodger (1944) as Cobbler (uncredited)
- Secrets of Scotland Yard (1944) as Alfred Morgan
- None but the Lonely Heart (1944) as Shooting Galley Proprietor (uncredited)
- The Man in Half Moon Street (1945) as Harris, Cabby (uncredited)
- Scotland Yard Investigator (1945) as Sam Todworthy
- Confidential Agent (1945) as Bates (uncredited)
- The Green Years (1946) as Peter Dickie (uncredited)
- Devotion (1946) as Hoggs (uncredited)
