= Just Before Nightfall =

1971 film by Claude Chabrol

- French theatrical release poster
- Directed by: Claude Chabrol
- Screenplay by: Claude Chabrol
- Based on: The Thin Line by Edward Atiyah
- Produced by: André Génovès
- Starring: Stéphane Audran; Michel Bouquet
- Cinematography: Jean Rabier
- Edited by: Jacques Gaillard
- Music by: Pierre Jansen
- Production companies: Cinegai S.p.A. Les Films de la Boétie
- Distributed by: Columbia Films
- Release date: 31 March 1971
- Running time: 107 minutes
- Countries: France; Italy
- Language: French

Just Before Nightfall (French: Juste avant la nuit) is a 1971 French crime drama film written and directed by Claude Chabrol and starring Stéphane Audran and Michel Bouquet. Based on the 1951 novel The Thin Line by Edward Atiyah, it follows a married businessman who, after killing his mistress, tries to ease his conscience by confessing to his wife and the victim's husband.

== Plot ==
Charles Masson, a married advertising executive and father of two children, has an affair with Laura, the wife of his best friend François, an architect. During one of their sadomasochistic sex games, Charles strangles Laura. While the police does not suspect him, Charles' conscience drives him to confess his crime first to his wife Hélène and later to François. Both ask him not to turn himself over to the authorities, as this would not bring Laura back to life and only destroy his family. Charles becomes gradually convinced that Laura's death was not an accident but his intention, as he felt humiliated by her. Unable to stand the strain any longer, Charles announces to Hélène that he will go to the police the next morning to make a confession. Hélène, preparing Charles' sleep medicine, deliberately gives him an overdose. His death is classified as a suicide. Some time later, Hélène sits at the beach with her children and her mother-in-law, who remarks that the children seem to be getting over their father's death.

== Cast ==
- Michel Bouquet as Charles Masson
- Stéphane Audran as Hélène Masson
- François Périer as François Tellier
- Jean Carmet as Jeannot
- Henri Attal as Cavanna
- Dominique Zardi as Prince
- Clelia Matania as Charles' mother
- Celia as Jacqueline
- Marina Ninchi as Gina Mallardi
- Anna Douking as Laura Tellier
- Michel Duchaussoy as Man at burial (uncredited)

== Release ==
Just Before Nightfall was released on March 31, 1971.

Paris-based Tamasa Distribution is set to release "Première Vague" a collection of blu-ray discs of seven early films by Chabrol. The box set is set for release in France on November 18, 2025. Variety reported that it would include films that were "long unavailable" to the public, including Just Before Nightfall.

== Reception ==
Just Before Nightfall met with positive reviews by contemporary American critics. In his 1976 review for the Chicago Sun-Times, Roger Ebert called the film "one of Chabrol's best films on his favorite theme", whose "last half-hour provides a series of moral reverses that leaves us, too, puzzled about what's right and what's wrong". Jacoba Atlas of the Los Angeles Free Press titled Chabrol "a master at showing the macabre murkiness that lies just below the surface of ordinary lives", who, with this film, has made "the definitive statement about the nightmare quality of the cowardly conscience of us all". David Pirie, writing for the British Time Out magazine, thought equally positive of the film, which he saw as a "tortuous, entertaining study of murder and the expiation of guilt" with "meticulous" direction, acting and script. While Vincent Canby of The New York Times objected that the film "eventually becomes too schematic", he acknowledged that "the scheme has so many ambiguous twists and turns that the film continues to provoke the memory long after one has left the theater", resulting in "a comedy of a high, intelligent and dark order". "On the scale of recent Chabrol films, Juste Avant La Nuit is somewhere below La Femme Infidèle and Le Boucher but above La Rupture."

== Awards ==
- BAFTA Award for Best Actress in a Leading Role for Stéphane Audran for Just Before Nightfall and The Discreet Charm of the Bourgeoisie

== See also ==
- The Stranger Within a Woman (1966), an adaptation of Atiyah's novel by Mikio Naruse
