= Anna Ascends =

1922 film by Victor Fleming

- Theatrical poster
- Directed by: Victor Fleming
- Written by: Margaret Turnbull (scenario)
- Based on: Anna Ascends by Harry Chapman Ford
- Produced by: Adolph Zukor; Jesse L. Lasky
- Starring: Alice Brady
- Cinematography: Gilbert Warrenton
- Distributed by: Paramount Pictures
- Release date: November 19, 1922
- Running time: 1:02:00
- Country: United States
- Language: Silent (English intertitles)

Anna Ascends is a 1922 American silent romantic drama film directed by Victor Fleming, and based on the 1920 play of the same title by Harry Chapman Ford. Alice Brady reprises her starring role from the Broadway play. The film is largely lost, with only a six-minute fragment still in existence.

== Overview ==
The Broadway play is about a working class Syrian American waitress who through hard work "ascends" the social and economic ladder and becomes successful in the United States. The playwright Henry Chapman Ford loosely based his play on a real-life Syrian immigrant waitress in Boston named Anna Ayyoub, who mesmerized him. In his book, The Arab Americans: A History, writer Gregory Orfalea describes Ford's inspiration by quoting him, "Their family life, their clean way of living impressed me and I decided that the Americanization of such a race was a big factor in making the "melting pot" one of the greatest nations of history". Ford went on: "I figured here is a people who could read and write probably 6,000 years before the northern 'blue eyes'. Here is a race who had a fine culture along with the great Egyptian dynasties, and as criminology seems to be a statistical fad at the present writing, here are a people who have less, en ratio, in prisons, than any other in the world. Hence, I figured, why not write a Syrian drama, a virgin field, anent the Syrians?"

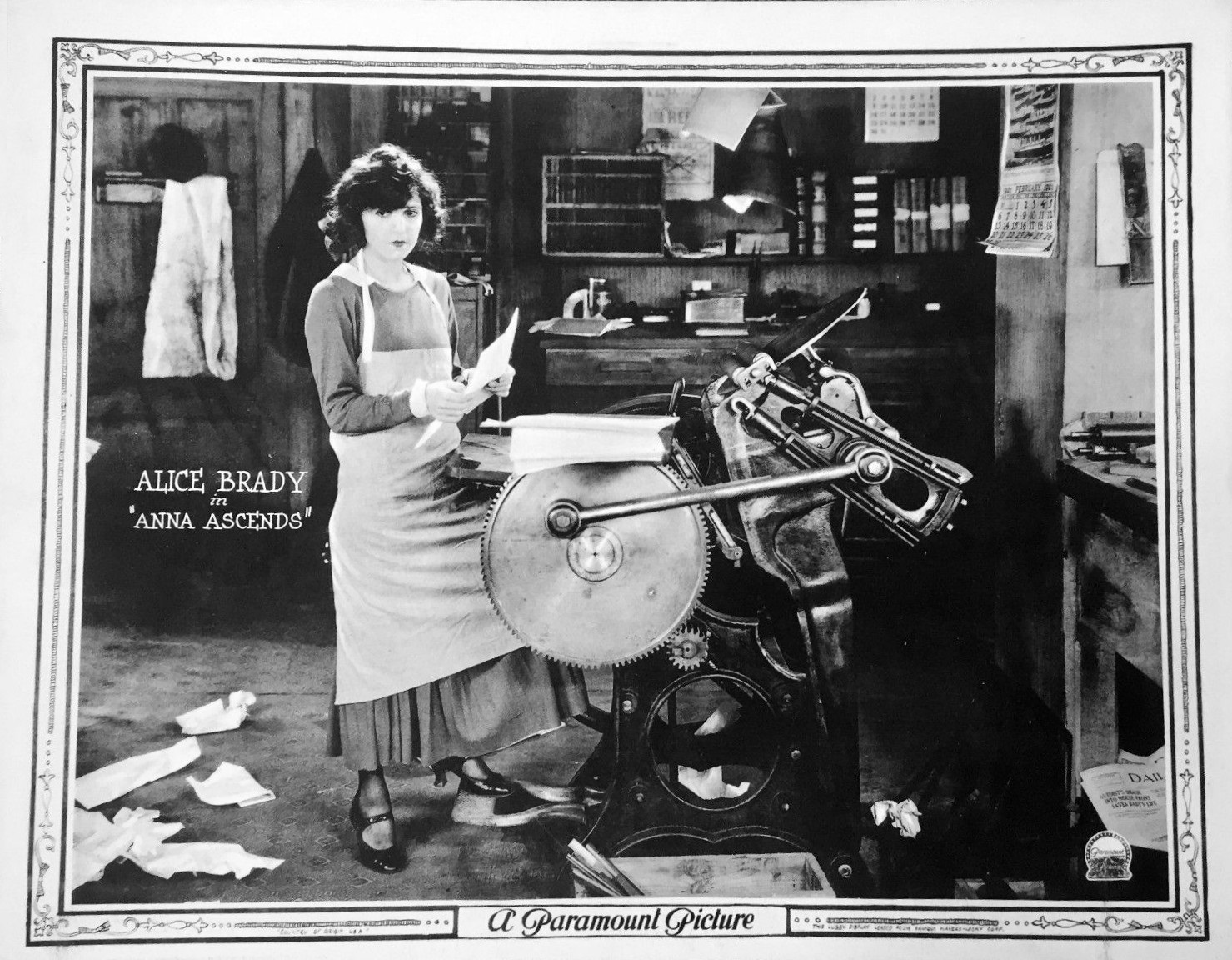
Lobby card

== Cast ==
- Alice Brady as Anna Ayyob
- Robert Ellis as Howard Fisk
- David Powell as The Baron
- Nita Naldi as Countess Rostoff
- Charles K. Gerrard as Count Rostoff
- Edouard Durand as Siad Coury (credited as Edward Durand)
- Florence Dixon as Bessie Fisk
- Grace Griswold as Miss Fisk
- Frederick Burton as Mr. Fisk
- Benjamin De Casseres as City Editor
