= Shadow of the Law (1926 film) =

1926 film by Wallace Worsley

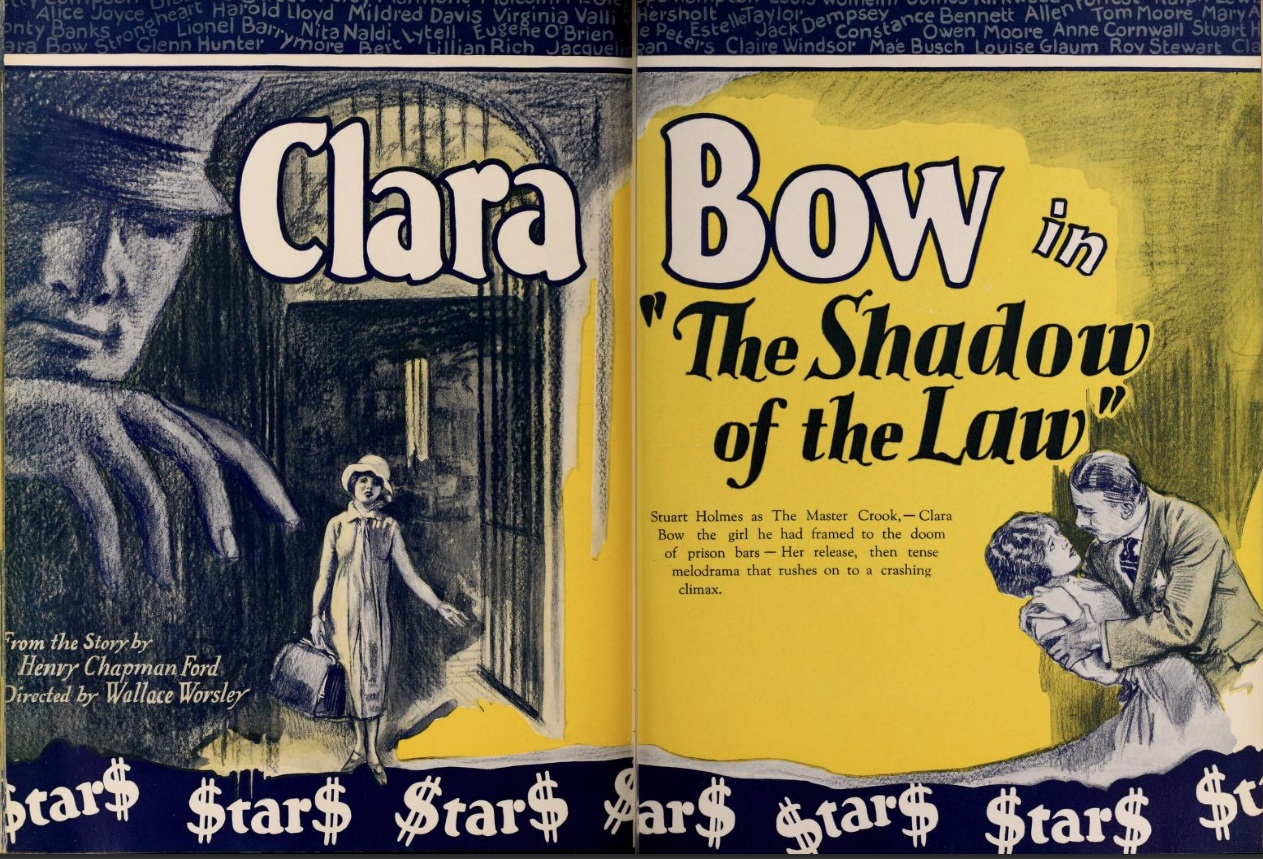
- Advertisement
- Directed by: Wallace Worsley
- Screenplay by: Leah Baird; Grover Jones
- Based on: Two Gates by Harry Chapman Ford
- Produced by: Leah Baird; Arthur F. Beck
- Starring: Clara Bow; Forrest Stanley
- Cinematography: Ray June
- Distributed by: Associated Exhibitors
- Release date: January 24, 1926 (United States)
- Running time: 50 mins.
- Country: United States
- Language: Silent (English intertitles)

Shadow of the Law is a 1926 American silent crime drama film starring Clara Bow as a woman sent to prison for a crime she did not commit. Directed by Wallace Worsley, the screenplay was written by Leah Baird and Grover Jones and was based on the novel Two Gates by Harry Chapman Ford.

== Plot ==
As described in a film magazine review, Mary Brophy, a young woman who is unjustly jailed by a master crook whom she refuses to wed, later meets and falls in love with James Reynolds, a young man who becomes her protector. While Mary is in jail, her father falls under the evil influence of the criminal gang leader. At a reception the young woman’s father is shot by the man she refused to wed. He is brought to justice and her romance thereafter goes smoothly.

== Cast ==
- Clara Bow as Mary Brophy
- Forrest Stanley as James Reynolds
- Stuart Holmes as Linyard
- Ralph Lewis as Brophy
- William V. Mong as Egan
- J. Emmett Beck as Martin
- Adele Farrington as Aunt
- Eddie Lyons as Crook
- George Cooper as Chauffeur

== Preservation ==
With no prints of The Shadow of the Law located in any film archives, it is considered a lost film. The film was cited by National Film Preservation Board on the Lost U.S. Silent Feature Films list in October 2019.
