= The Innocent Party =

1938 play

- Original language: English
- Written by: H.M. Harwood; Laurence Kirk
- Genre: Comedy
- Setting: London and the English countryside, present day

Premiere
- Date: 10 January 1938
- Place: Opera House, Manchester

The Innocent Party is a 1938 comedy play by the British writers H.M. Harwood and Laurence Kirk. A woman has to decide whether she is needed more by her husband or her lover.

It premiered at the Opera House, Manchester before transferring to the St James's Theatre in London's West End where it ran for 52 performances between 27 January and 12 March 1938. The original London cast included Basil Radford, Cecil Parker, Elizabeth Allan, Mary Ellis and Jack Lambert.

== Bibliography ==
- Wearing, J.P. The London Stage 1930-1939: A Calendar of Productions, Performers, and Personnel. Rowman & Littlefield, 2014.
