= Grace Griswold =

American actress and writer

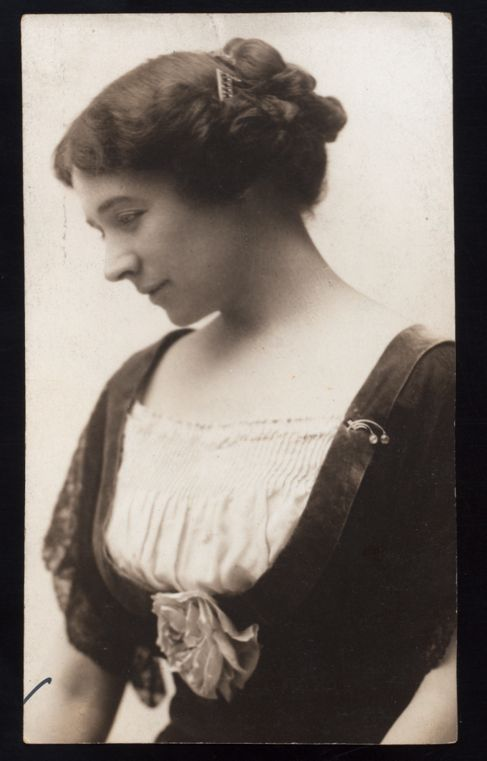
- early stage portrait
- Born: Grace Griswold Hall; 1871; Ashtabula, Ohio
- Died: June 13, 1927 (aged 55–56); New York, New York
- Occupation: Actress
- Years active: 1894-1927

Grace Griswold (1871-1927) was an American stage and film actress. She was born to Joseph B. Hall and Juliet Griswold. She was educated in the Chicago area. Before beginning her stage career she had been a secretary and journalist. In November 1894, she made her stage debut at Daly's Theatre in Shakespeare's play Twelfth Night. She appeared on stage with some well known names of the day such as Raymond Hitchcock, John Bunny, Elsie Janis in her big breakout hit The Vanderbilt Cup, Julie Herne and Mary Shaw

Long a character actress on Broadway, she made her first silent film appearance in George Arliss's 1921 version of Disraeli. Her later movie appearances were sporadic and she died in 1927.

== Some Theater ==
- The Village Postmaster (1900)
- Cashel Byron (1900)
- Easy Dawson (1905)
- The Vanderbilt Cup (1906 & revived 1907)
- Votes for Women (1909)
- Over Night (1911)
- Hamlet (1912)
- The Point of View (1912)
- The Poor Little Rich Girl (1913)
- Who's Who (1913)
- The Good Men Do (1918)
- Billeted (1922)

== Filmography ==
- Disraeli (1921)
- Smilin' Through (1922)
- One Exciting Night (1922)
- Anna Ascends (1922)
- The Ragged Edge (1923)
