= Eve's Leaves =

1926 film by Paul Sloane

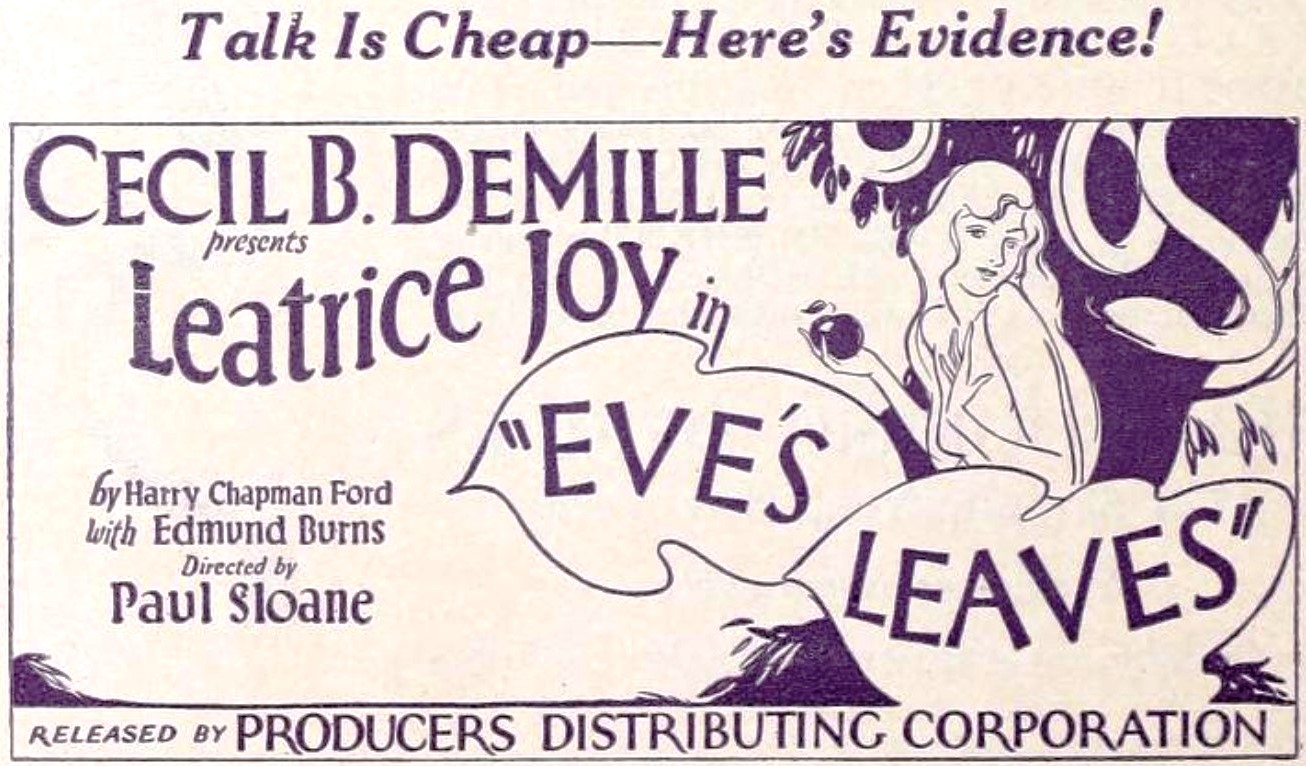
- Advertisement
- Directed by: Paul Sloane
- Written by: Elmer Harris (story); Jack Jevne (adaptation); John W. Krafft (intertitles)
- Based on: Eve's Leaves by Harry Chapman Ford
- Produced by: Cecil B. DeMille
- Starring: Leatrice Joy; William Boyd
- Cinematography: Arthur C. Miller
- Production company: DeMille Pictures Corporation
- Distributed by: Producers Distributing Corporation
- Release date: June 13, 1926
- Running time: 7 reels (6,754 feet)
- Country: United States
- Language: Silent (English intertitles)

Eve's Leaves is a 1926 American silent romantic comedy film starring Leatrice Joy and William Boyd. The film was produced and distributed by Cecil B. DeMille and directed by Paul Sloane. It is based upon the 1925 play of the same name by Harry Chapman Ford.

== Plot ==
Captain Corbin, who operates the tramp cargo ship Garden of Eden, has raised his daughter Eve as a boy. After learning about men after reading some romance novels belonging to the cook Cookie, she goes ashore in a Chinese port to find her true love and spies American Bob Britton, whom she then has kidnapped to augment the ship's crew.

Pirate Chang Fang and his pirates capture the ship seeking passage to his stronghold. With Cookie's help, Eve remakes herself using an outfit made from a curtain and some beads, which draws the interest of both Chang and Bob. In the end, Eve saves the day and she and Bob are married on board by a missionary.

== Cast ==
- Leatrice Joy as Eve Corbin
- William Boyd as Bob Britton
- Robert Edeson as Captain Corbin
- Walter Long as Chang Fang
- Richard Carle as Thomas Britton
- Arthur Hoyt as Missionary
- Sōjin Kamiyama as Le Sing
- K. Nambu as The Executioner
- Eddie Harris as Cookie, the cook

== Production ==
Leatrice Joy had impulsively cut her hair short in 1926, and DeMille, whom Joy had followed when he set up Producers Distributing Corporation, was publicly angry as it prevented her from portraying traditional feminine roles. The studio developed projects with roles suitable for her “Leatrice Joy bob”, and Eve's Leaves was the second of five films before she regrew her hair. In both Eve's Leaves and The Clinging Vine (1926), Joy's character is mistaken as being male in at least one scene. In 1928, a professional dispute would end the Joy / DeMille partnership and she signed with MGM.

Intertitles featuring quotes from stereotype Chinese characters are in a racist fictional Asian dialect that today would be considered offensive.

== Preservation ==
A 16mm print of Eve's Leaves is preserved at the UCLA Film & Television Archive and the film has been released on DVD.
