= Edward Atiyah =

British writer and political activist (1903–1964)

Edward Selim Atiyah (Arabic: ادوار سليم عطية; 1903 – 22 October 1964) was a Lebanese author and political activist. He is best known for his 1946 autobiography An Arab Tells His Story, and his 1955 book The Arabs.

He came to England to study at Brasenose College, Oxford University, and there met and married a Scottish woman, Jean Levens. They had four children, including the renowned mathematician, Sir Michael Atiyah, and Patrick Atiyah, an academic and professor of law.

He served as secretary of the Arab League office in London.

== Controversy ==
One passage from his 1955 book, The Arabs, is widely quoted in whole or in part:

This wholesale exodus was due partly to the belief of the Arabs, encouraged by the boastings of an unrealistic Arabic press and the irresponsible utterances of some of the Arab leaders that it could only be a matter of weeks before the Jews were defeated by the armies of the Arab states and the Palestinian Arabs enabled to re-enter and retake possession of their country. But it was also, and in many parts of the country, largely due to a policy of deliberate terrorism and eviction followed by the Jewish commanders in the areas they occupied, and reaching its peak of brutality in the massacre of Deir Yassin. (p. 183)

Part of the quote has been used as evidence of Arab responsibility for the Palestinian exodus in 1948. In The Spectator of 16 June 1961, Leo Kohn, professor of political science at Hebrew University and an ambassador-rank adviser to the Israeli Foreign Office, used it to support his contention that:

There is also a wealth of evidence from Arab sources to show that the Arab League at an early stage of the campaign adopted a policy of evacuating the Arab population to the neighbouring countries, being convinced that their absence would be of short duration and would facilitate the impending military operations.

However, Atiyah contested this interpretation. In a letter to The Spectator of 23 June 1961, he said that Kohn had omitted the "policy of deliberate terrorism and eviction followed by the Jewish commanders" and that there was:

... no suggestion whatever in what I wrote that the exodus of the Arab refugees was a result of a policy of evacuating the Arab population. What I said is something quite different from the Zionist allegation that the Arab refugees were ordered or even told by their leaders to evacuate ...

== Death ==
Atiyah died in 1964 at the age of 61 while taking part in a debate on Arab-Israeli relations at the Oxford Union.

== Works ==
- An Arab Tells his Story: A Study in Loyalties. London: John Murray, 1946. Autobiography.
- What Was Promised in Palestine. London: The Arab Office, 1946.
- The Palestine Question. London: Diplomatic Press & Publishing Co., 1948.
- The Thin Line. London: Peter Davies, 1951
  The U.S. paperback edition is called Murder, My Love, New York: Avon, 1951. This crime novel has inspired two films: Onnano nakani iru tanin (The Stranger Within a Woman) (1966) by Mikio Naruse, and Juste avant la nuit (1971) by Claude Chabrol.
- Black Vanguard. London: Peter Davies, 1952.
- Lebanon Paradise: A Novel. London: Peter Davies, 1953.
- What is Imperialism?. London: Batchworth Press, 1954.
- The Arabs. Harmondsworth: Penguin Books, 1955.
  The cover has "the origins, present conditions, and prospects of the Arab world".
- The Crime of Julian Masters. London: Robert Hale, 1959.
- The Eagle Flies from England. London: Robert Hale, 1960.
- Donkey From the Mountains. London: Robert Hale, 1961.
  The U.S. edition is called The Cruel Fire, New York: Doubleday Crime Club, 1962.

== See also ==
- Broadcasts, by Christopher Hitchens
