= The Stranger Within a Woman =

1966 film by Mikio Naruse

- Japanese film poster
- 女の中にいる他人
- Directed by: Mikio Naruse
- Written by: Toshirō Ide; Edward Atiyah (novel)
- Produced by: Sanezumi Fujimoto; Masakatsu Kaneko
- Starring: Keiju Kobayashi; Michiyo Aratama; Tatsuya Mihashi; Mitsuko Kusabue
- Cinematography: Yasumichi Fukuzawa
- Edited by: Eiji Ooi
- Music by: Hikaru Hayashi
- Production company: Toho
- Distributed by: Toho
- Release date: 25 January 1966 (Japan)
- Running time: 102 minutes
- Country: Japan
- Language: Japanese

The Stranger Within a Woman a.k.a. The Thin Line (Japanese: 女の中にいる他人, Hepburn: Onna no naka ni iru tanin) is a 1966 Japanese drama film directed by Mikio Naruse. It is based on the 1951 novel The Thin Line by Edward Atiyah.

== Plot ==
Isao and Masako Toshiro are what looks like a happily married middle-class couple with two children. One day, Sayuri, wife of close friend Ryukichi Sugimoto, is found strangled. As it turns out, Sayuri had an affair with another man. Isao, struggling with his conscience, confesses to Masako that he was the man Sayuri had the affair with, and was responsible for her death, although inadvertently. To preserve the family's reputation and sheltered life, Masako begs her husband to keep his deed a secret. Isao also confesses to Ryukichi, who slaps him in return, but refrains from bringing charges against him. When Isao eventually announces to turn himself in to the police, which he sees as the only way to find peace and maintain his personal honour, Masako poisons him with a soporific. His death is classified as suicide. Some time later, while taking a walk on the beach with her children, Masako wonders how she will be able to live with her secret.

== Cast ==
- Keiju Kobayashi as Isao Tashiro
- Michiyo Aratama as Masako Tashiro
- Mitsuko Kusabue as Yumiko Kato
- Tatsuya Mihashi as Ryukichi Sugimoto
- Akiko Wakabayashi as Sayuri Sugimoto
- Daisuke Katō as bar owner
- Toshio Kurosawa as bartender
- Chieko Nakakita as Chiyoko

== Release and legacy ==
The Stranger Within a Woman was produced and distributed by Toho and received a roadshow theatrical release on January 25, 1966. The film was released with English subtitles in the United States by Toho International in July 1967.

Edward Atiyah's novel was again adapted for the screen by Claude Chabrol for Just Before Nightfall (1971). The Stranger Within a Woman was also remade twice for Japanese television in 1981 (again scripted by Toshirō Ide) and 2017.

== Awards ==
- Mainichi Film Concour for Best Supporting Actor Tatsuya Mihashi
