= F. Tennyson Jesse =

British criminologist and writer (1888–1958)

- Photograph c. 1922
- Born: Winifred Margaret Jesse; 1 March 1888; Chislehurst, Kent, United Kingdom
- Died: 6 August 1958 (aged 70); London, United Kingdom
- Education: Newlyn School
- Occupations: novelist, playwright, criminologist, cartoonist
- Spouse: H. M. Harwood (m. 1918–1958; her death)
- Parent(s): Eustace Tennyson D'Eyncourt Jesse; Edith James Jesse
- Relatives: Emilia Tennyson (grandmother); Alfred, Lord Tennyson (great uncle)
- Writing career
- Language: English
- Period: 1913–1957
- Genres: crime fiction, detective fiction, criminology
- Notable works: A Pin to See the Peepshow, Murder & Its Motives, Notable British Trials

Fryniwyd Tennyson Jesse Harwood (born Wynifried (Winifred) Margaret Jesse; 1 March 1888 – 6 August 1958) was an English journalist, author and criminologist.

== Early life ==
She was the second of three daughters of the Rev. Eustace Tennyson D'Eyncourt Jesse (1853–1928), vicar of St Peter Kirkley, and his wife Edith Louisa James (1866–1941). Her paternal grandmother was Emilia Tennyson.

Her older sister, Stella Mary Jesse (1887–1942), was an actress, and married in 1929 Eric Andrew Simson, who wrote under the name Laurence Kirk. She wrote a novel, Eve in Egypt (1929), as Jane Starr. Her younger sister, Edith Mary Ermyntrude was born in 1890, and died in 1892, in South Africa.

The family's life was itinerant. Eustace Jesse left Kirkley in 1890. The family had an interlude in South Africa, sailing there at the end of 1891, and staying in Cape Town and Grahamstown, as Eustace Jesse sought a clerical appointment. He moved in 1893 to St Stephen's Church on Guernsey, as a curate. In 1898 he was a chaplain at Marsala in Sicily, for a year. From 1900 for three years he was a licentiate in the Diocese of Colombo. Then he was a curate at St George's Cathedral, Georgetown from 1905 to 1907, after that returning to Ceylon, at Polwatte.

After attending day schools, Wynifried Jesse aged 18 went, while her father was in British Guiana, to the Forbes School of Painting at Newlyn, Cornwall, run by Stanhope and Elizabeth Forbes. "Fryn" is a self-made contraction of "Wynifried", which she adopted at this period. She did not return home. She worked for a time as a painter, exhibiting in Liverpool and Leeds, and she illustrated a book.

== Journalist ==
Jesse moved to London in 1911 and found work as a journalist. She wrote for the Daily Mail and The Times.

After an accident in a pusher configuration aeroplane, Jesse lost the use of her right hand, and used a prosthetic. She learned to type using her left hand alone, and picked up her career. She was treated with morphia for pain relief, became dependent, and was a patient of Armando Child to cope with the habit. She for the rest of her life suffered from periods of depression.

Jesse reported on the German attacks on Belgium in the First World War for Collier's Weekly, in November 1914,. She was in a group of American journalists: E. Alexander Powell, Joseph Medill Patterson and the photographer Donald C. Thompson, and witnessed the siege of Antwerp.

== Later life ==
Frederick W. Hilles who met Jesse at dinner in 1930 described her in his diary as "blonde with a hard face & a tremendous sense of her importance in things intellectual." With her husband, she travelled widely in the two decades after her marriage. She associated with Somerset Maugham and E. Phillips Oppenheim on the French Riviera. She died at home of a heart attack on 6 August 1958 at 11 Melina Place, St John's Wood, London.

== Books ==
=== Crime ===
Murder and its Motives (Heinemann, 1924) divided killers into six categories based on their motivations: those who murder for Gain, Revenge, Elimination, Jealousy, Conviction and Lust of killing. This classification of motive was quoted in 1958 by the criminologist Marvin Wolfgang. The forensic scientist John Glaister suggested sex should be a seventh category. The classification has been said to anticipate that in the FBI Crime Classification Manual. The pathologist Francis Camps was complimentary about Jesse's standing as a criminologist.

Jesse contributed introductions to cases in the Notable British Trials series.

- Trial of Madeleine Smith (1927) Madeleine Smith was charged with murder in 1857.
- Trial of Samuel Herbert Dougal (1928). Samuel Herbert Dougal was convicted in 1903 of the murder of Camille Cecile Holland.
- Trial of Sidney Harry Fox (1934). Sidney Harry Fox was convicted of the 1929 murder of his mother.
- Trial of Alma Victoria Rattenbury and George Percy Stoner (1935) Alma Rattenbury and George Stoner were accused of the murder of Alma's husband, with Rattenbury being acquitted and Stoner found guilty in 1935.
- Trial of Thomas John Ley and Lawrence John Smith - the Chalk Pit Murder (1947) Thomas Ley was found guilty in 1946 of the murder with accomplices of John McMain Mudie.
- The Trials of Timothy John Evans and John Reginald Halliday Christie (1957). Timothy Evans was hanged for the murder of his daughter Geraldine, and posthumously pardoned. The trial of serial killer John Christie followed.

Also Comments on Cain (1948), on the trials of Harold Wolcott, Reginald Ivor Hinks and the serial killer Eugen Weidmann

Her novels include A Pin to See the Peepshow (London, W. Heinemann Ltd, 1934; Virago Modern Classics; British Library Women Writers), a fictional treatment of the case of Edith Thompson and Frederick Bywaters. She also edited the British edition of The Baffle Book, A Parlour Game of Mystery and Detection (1930), a crime puzzle book by the Americans Lassiter Wren and Randle McKay.

=== Other non-fiction ===
- The Sword of Deborah (1918), collected war journalism. Commissioned by the Ministry of Information, it concentrated on the work of the British Women's Army in France.
- Sabi Pas: Or, I Don't Know (1935), on life in Provence
- London Front: Letters Written to America, 1939–1940 (1941), with H. M. Harwood
- While London Burns: Letters Written to America. (July 1940–June 1941) (1942)
- The Saga of "San Demetrio" (1942), an HMSO publication. The 1943 film San Demetrio London was based on it; the screenwriters were Charles Frend and Robert Hamer, with Jesse given a story credit.
- The Story of Burma (1946). Jesse visited India in the early 1920s, and met Harcourt Butler, at that time Governor of the United Provinces of Agra and Oudh. He later governed Burma, and she visited him at Government House, Rangoon, when writing a novel based in Burma. There Arthur John Stanley White was asked to help her with access to historical records. The Story of Burma was reviewed by George Orwell in The Observer in February 1946, and some correspondence ensued with Jesse, who "took great exception", while explaining that she enjoyed Orwell's work.

=== Fiction ===
Not including A Pin to See the Peepshow, Jesse wrote nine novels.

- The Milky Way (1913), first novel
- Secret Bread (1917)
- The White Riband (1921)
- Tom Fool (Heinemann, 1926), a novel, deals with a young man's experiences on sailing ships, and describes shipboard life in some detail.
- Moonraker (Heinemann, 1927), historical novel. In his 1981 introduction Bob Leeson states that it contains both an embodiment of woman's rebellion and a cry for freedom for black people.
- The Lacquer Lady (1929), historical novel, about the European maid of honour Fanny Moroni, the Third Anglo-Burmese War and the defeat of the Konbaung dynasty at the end of the 19th century. In the preface Jesse acknowledged help with the account from Rodway Charles John Swinhoe, an English barrister in Burma.
- Act of God (1937)
- The Alabaster Cup (1950), novel with some autobiographical content
- The Dragon in the Heart: A Love Story (1956)

An early story was "The Dog Decides", published in The Idler in 1911. Short story collections:

- Beggars on Horseback (1915)
- Many Latitudes (1928)
- The Solange Stories (1931), with the character Solange Fontaine

The 1924 story Thirty Pieces of Silver, based on the biblical betrayal, was often reprinted, sometimes as the variant Treasure Trove.

=== Poetry ===
- The Happy Bride (1921)
- The Compass: And Other Poems (1951)

== Plays ==
Jesse co-wrote six plays with H. M. Harwood (her husband from 1918), and three more on her own.

- The Black Mask (1913, New York), The Mask (1915, London) with Harwood, based on her 1912 short story The Mask. The original story is in Alfred Hitchcock Presents: A Baker's Dozen of Suspense Stories (Dell, 1963).
- Billeted (1917) with Harwood At the Royalty Theatre from 21 August 1917, it had a 240-performance run.
- The Hotel Mouse (1921) with Harwood. This play was an adaptation of Souris d'hôtel from the French of Paul Armont and Marcel Gerbidon.
- Quarantine (1922). It had an American production in 1924, with Helen Hayes directed by Edgar Selwyn. Lovers in Quarantine (1925) was a film version of this "farce comedy".
- The Pelican (1924) with Harwood. It had a Broadway run produced by A. H. Woods in 1925.
- Anyhouse (1925). It had a run at the Ambassadors Theatre in March 1925.
- How to be Happy Though Married (1930) with Harwood
- Birdcage (1950) with Harold Dearden
- A Pin to see the Peepshow (1951), adapted from her novel, with Harwood

== Marriage ==
Fryniwyd Jesse married Harold Marsh Harwood (1874–1959), a businessman and theatre manager, in September 1918. The marriage was kept secret until 1922; a guest of Arnold Bennett for dinner at the Savoy Hotel on New Year's Eve 1920, she went as Miss Tennyson Jesse. It was Harwood who wished for secrecy, since he was concerned to retain access to the son he had fathered with a married woman. Fryniwyd miscarried three times, the couple having no children.
