= Lovers in Quarantine =

1925 film by Frank Tuttle

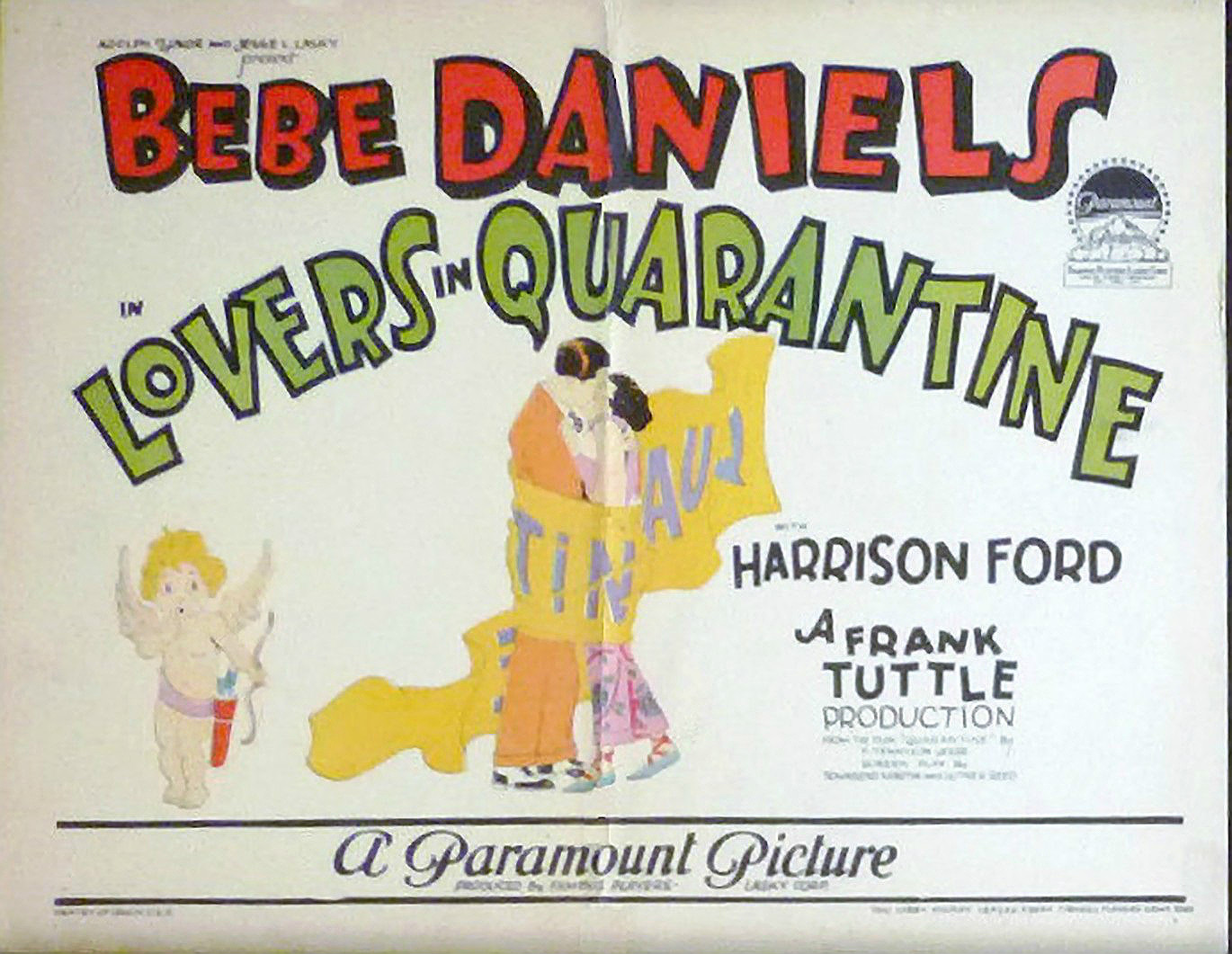
- Lobby card
- Directed by: Frank Tuttle
- Written by: Townsend Martin (scenario); Luther Reed (scenario)
- Based on: Quarantine by F. Tennyson Jesse
- Produced by: Adolph Zukor; Jesse Lasky
- Starring: Bebe Daniels
- Cinematography: J. Roy Hunt
- Distributed by: Paramount Pictures
- Release date: October 11, 1925
- Running time: 7 reels; 6,570 feet
- Country: United States
- Language: Silent (English intertitles)

Lovers in Quarantine is an extant 1925 American silent comedy film starring Bebe Daniels and directed by Frank Tuttle. It was produced by Famous Players–Lasky and distributed by Paramount Pictures. The film is based on a 1924 Broadway play Quarantine by F. Tennyson Jesse. The film entered the public domain on January 1, 2021.

== Cast ==
- Bebe Daniels as Diana
- Harrison Ford as Anthony Blunt
- Alfred Lunt as Mackintosh Josephs
- Eden Gray as Pamela Gordon
- Edna May Oliver as Amelia Pincent
- Diana Kane as Lola
- Ivan F. Simpson as The Silent Passenger
- Marie Shotwell as Mrs. Borroughs
- Gunboat Smith as Minor Role (uncredited)

== Preservation ==
A print of Lovers in Quarantine is preserved at the Library of Congress.
