= H. M. Harwood =

British playwright and theatre manager (1874–1959)

- Born: 29 March 1874; Ellesmere Park
- Died: 19 April 1959 (aged 85)
- Education: Marlborough College; Trinity College, Cambridge
- Occupation: Businessman

Harold Marsh Harwood (29 March 1874 – 19 April 1959) was a British businessman, playwright, screenwriter and theatre manager. He was the son of the businessman and politician George Harwood and the husband of F. Tennyson Jesse who co-wrote some of Harwood's work. The Pelican was a successful play credited to the couple. Screen writing credits include The Iron Duke and Queen Christina.

== Early life ==
He was born at Ellesmere Park, the son of George Harwood MP and his first wife Alice Marsh, and grandson of the founder of the cotton-spinning business Richard Harwood & Son at Halliwell. As a boy he saw Mary Anderson and Barry Sullivan at Manchester, and followed the Compton Comedy Company at Southport. He was educated at Marlborough College and matriculated at Trinity College, Cambridge in 1892. He graduated B.A. in 1895, and M.B.B.Ch. and M.A. in 1900. As an undergraduate he led drama groups that went annually to the Oxford House Settlement in London.

A medical student at St Thomas's Hospital, Harwood after qualifying M.D. there went into private practice in Throgmorton Avenue, City of London. His father's wish was that he should be a doctor, but he wanted to have evenings free of medical calls, so as to spend time writing plays. This period was cut short when he moved back north to Bolton, aged 26, to join the management of the family firm. After two years learning the cotton business, his health broke down. He took a year off, returning in 1903. He continued to write, and put on several productions a year with the Bolton Amateur Dramatic Company he founded.

In 1906 Harwood became a Justice of the Peace for Bolton; he identified himself as a Liberal Party supporter, of Hill Top, Heaton. He was a Liberal councillor for West Ward, stepping down in 1910. On the death of his father, sitting Member of Parliament for Bolton, in November 1912, he was asked to stand for parliament in his stead, but refused.

Harwood in 1910 chaired a Bolton suffrage meeting at which Alice Abadam and Maude Royden spoke. The autumn 1912 season of the Bolton Amateur Dramatic Company consisted of Rutherford & Son by Githa Sowerby and The Return of the Prodigal by St John Hankin.

== World War I ==
In 1914 Harwood joined up to the Royal Army Medical Corps (RAMC). He served during the war in France, and the Sinai and Palestine campaign. In mid-1915, he was transferred from Red Cross work in France to St Thomas's Hospital, as one of those taking charge of its military wards. In 1916, he was house surgeon with the rank of lieutenant.

== Later life ==
Harwood left the RAMC in 1919. That year, he leased the Ambassadors Theatre in West Street, London, which he retained until 1932. Harwood's own play A Grain of Mustard Seed had a run at the Ambassadors in 1920, and then transferred to the Kingsway Theatre for a month.

In business, Harwood was managing director and chairman of Richard Harwood & Son, and later chairman of Fine Spinners and Doublers from 1940 to 1950.

== Theatrical productions ==
In Bolton Harwood put on plays by Shakespeare, George Bernard Shaw (Arms and the Man), Elizabeth Baker (Chains), and John Galsworthy (The Silver Box). As a London theatre manager, he produced at the Ambassadors':

- Sylvia's Lovers (1919), light opera, composer Bernard Rolt, book Cosmo Gordon-Lennox based on La Double Inconstancy by Pierre de Marivaux
- The White Headed Boy (1920) by Lennox Robinson, with J. B. Fagan as director; first production
- If (1921) by Lord Dunsany
- Deburau (1921), with the debut of Ivor Novello, English translation by Harley Granville-Barker from the French of Sacha Guitry
- The Pelican (1924) written with F. Tennyson Jesse
- Anyhouse by F. Tennyson Jesse
- The Emperor Jones (1925) with Paul Robeson in the leading role, by Eugene O'Neill

For the 1925–6 of the revival of The Madras House at the Ambassadors', the author Granville-Barker was understood to be producing it himself.

The Grain of Mustard Seed (1920), his own work, was described in his obituary in The Times as "probably Harwood's best known play", and was well received. Its initial run in 1920 had Norman McKinnel in the leading role, Jerry Weston, and he also directed. It was transferred to the Kingsway Theatre, and there were revivals at the Ambassadors' in 1924 and 1930. Clarence Stratton wrote of it:

The newest, most novel, thoughtful drama in London. Technically, years ahead of The Skin Game. Realistic exposé of British political games, and a vivid picture of after-war results on women—the younger and most impressionable, the more startling.

== Selected works ==
- Honour Thy Father (1912), debut with a one-act play at the Little Theatre on 15 December. It was put on by Edith Craig's Pioneer Players. This was second on a triple bill, first being The Thumbscrew by Edith Lyttelton, and third Beastie by Hugh de Selincourt.
- Interlopers (1913), put on at the Royalty Theatre by Dennis Eadie and J. E. Vedrenne.
- Theodore & Co (1916), book for musical comedy with George Grossmith Jr.
- Billeted (1917), with F. Tennyson Jesse, American production as Lonely Soldiers
- Confederates (1930), with Gabrielle Enthoven, if already published in 1926 under Harwood's name alone. It was performed at the Ambassadors Theatre in 1930.
- Cynara (1930), play, with Robert Gore-Browne. It was an adaptation of Gore-Browne's 1928 novel The Imperfect Lover, and ran at the Playhouse Theatre with Gladys Cooper and Gerald du Maurier in the leading roles. The chosen title alludes to a poem by Ernest Dowson. The play had a six-month Broadway run in 1931–2 at the Morosco Theatre, with Phoebe Foster and Philip Merivale. The 1932 film Cynara directed by King Vidor was another, independent adaptation from the novel.
- The Innocent Party (1938, play)
- Dramatisation of The Thin Line by Edward Atiyah, performed in 1953 at the Whitehall Theatre.

=== Screenplays ===
- Queen Christina (1933), screenplay with Salka Viertel
- Personal Property (1937), screenplay from his own play The Man in Possession.

== Family ==
In 1918 Harwood married Wynifried Margaret Jesse, who used the diminutive Fryn, and the pen name F. Tennyson Jesse. She was the daughter of the Rev. Eustace Jesse, a nephew of Alfred Tennyson. He had been a friend of the Jesse family from the 1890s; they met again to collaborate on a stage version of her 1912 story The Mask. Harwood had been carrying on an affair with a married woman, with whom he had a son, and to protect his access to the boy the marriage was covert, not being made public for some time. Harold and Fryn had no children together.
