= Personal Property (film) =

1937 film by W. S. Van Dyke

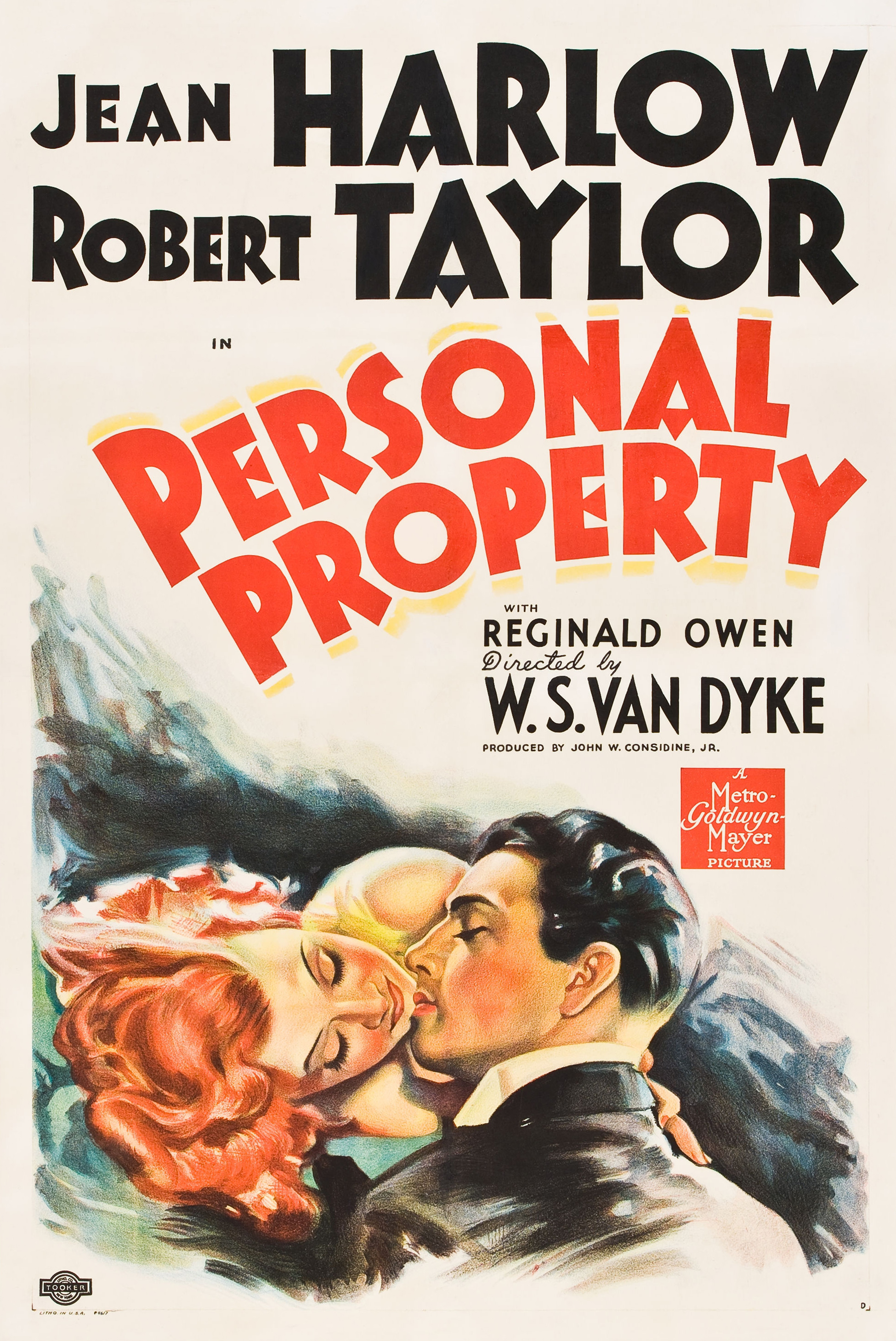
- Theatrical release poster
- Directed by: W.S. Van Dyke
- Screenplay by: Hugh Mills; Ernest Vajda
- Based on: 1930 play The Man in Possession by H.M. Harwood
- Produced by: John W. Considine Jr.
- Starring: Jean Harlow; Robert Taylor; Reginald Owen
- Cinematography: William H. Daniels
- Edited by: Ben Lewis
- Music by: Franz Waxman; Edward Ward
- Production company: Metro-Goldwyn-Mayer
- Distributed by: Loew's Inc.
- Release date: March 19, 1937
- Running time: 84 minutes
- Country: United States
- Language: English
- Budget: $299,000
- Box office: $1,731,000

Personal Property is a 1937 American romantic comedy film starring Jean Harlow and Robert Taylor and directed by W.S. Van Dyke. It is based on the play The Man in Possession by H. M. Harwood which had previously been made into a film The Man in Possession by MGM. It was the last fully completed film made by Harlow.

== Plot ==
Raymond Dabney gets out of prison and is welcomed home by his mother; but his father and brother Claude Dabney offer him money to go away. Raymond likes London, and his mother tells him that Claude is engaged. Raymond goes out and meets Crystal Wetherby. He joins her box at the opera; but she leaves, and he follows. She is pestered by bill collectors, and Raymond meets a bailiff at her door. A policeman tells Crystal that Raymond has a writ to stay there and make sure no one takes the furniture. Crystal's maid Clara approves of marrying for money. Crystal tells Raymond that her husband shot the trophies and gives him his large pajamas, scaring him into the butler's room.

Raymond brings Crystal breakfast; but she tries to get rid of him. Claude calls Crystal, and she tells Raymond that her fiancé's parents are coming for dinner. Raymond offers to "butle" as Ferguson for her, and they practice with Crystal playing Catherine Burns and Lord Carstairs. Raymond learns his family is coming, and he announces them. Claude tells Raymond to clear out. Catherine Burns and Mrs. Burns arrive, followed by absent-minded Lord Carstairs and mumbling Arthur. Raymond serves cocktails, and Claude tells Crystal they can marry and share their possessions. Claude and Mr. Dabney say they are in ladies underwear. Catherine tries to flirt with Ferguson, but he is too busy. Claude says the best investment is marriage. Raymond spills food on Claude, who demands he leave. After the other guests leave, Claude tells Crystal that Raymond just got out of prison. Raymond says he will leave if Crystal asks him; but she says he can stay so he won't lose his job. She thanks Raymond for not exposing her. Crystal sends Clara to bed and washes dishes as Raymond dries them. Raymond tells Crystal that Catherine wants to hire him, and Catherine calls. Raymond and Crystal pretend to have a picnic and say good-night.

In the morning Claude asks Raymond to leave before Crystal finds out who he is, and Raymond agrees for 500 pounds. Raymond asks Crystal about the wedding, and they quarrel because she is marrying for money. Before the wedding Raymond tells the bailiff the bill is paid. Raymond shows Claude the writ as men remove furniture. Raymond offers to explain to Crystal for Claude that he was a fortune hunter. Raymond tells Crystal that Claude is not marrying her, and they kiss.

== Cast ==
- Jean Harlow as Crystal Wetherby
- Robert Taylor as Raymond Dabney, aka Ferguson
- Reginald Owen as Claude Dabney (playing the same character in the earlier 1931 film adaptation of the play The Man in Possession)
- Una O'Connor as Clara
- Henrietta Crosman as Mrs. Cosgrove Dabney
- E.E. Clive as Cosgrove Dabney
- Cora Witherspoon as Mrs. Burns
- Marla Shelton as Catherine Burns
- Forrester Harvey as Herbert Jenkins (playing the same character in the earlier 1931 film adaptation of the play The Man in Possession)
- Lionel Braham as Lord Carstairs
- Barnett Parker as Arthur 'Trevy' Trevelyan

== Box office ==
According to MGM records the film made $1,086,000 in the U.S. and Canada and $645,000 in other markets, resulting in a profit of $872,000.
