= The Thin Line (novel) =

1951 novel by Edward Atiyah

- First edition (US)
- Author: Edward Atiyah
- Original title: The Thin Line (novel)
- Language: English
- Genre: Crime fiction
- Publisher: Peter Davies (UK); Harper & Brothers (US)
- Publication date: 1951
- Publication place: Britain
- Media type: Print

The Thin Line, later re-issued as Murder, My Love, is a 1951 crime novel by the British-Lebanese author Edward Atiyah. It was filmed twice, first as The Stranger Within a Woman by Naruse Mikio, 1966, and then by Claude Chabrol, as Just Before Nightfall, 1971.
