= John Eugene Vedrenne =

British theatre producer

John Eugene Vedrenne, 1922

John Eugene Vedrenne (July 13, 1867-February 12, 1930), often known as J. E. Vedrenne, was a West End theatre producer who co-managed the Savoy Theatre with Harley Granville-Barker, and then (from 1904 to 1907, also with Granville-Barker) the Royal Court Theatre. During their time at the latter, they premiered several of George Bernard Shaw's plays, including John Bull's Other Island and Major Barbara. His partnership with Granville-Barker ending in 1907, Vedrenne then became associated with Lewis Waller at the Lyric Theatre, and in 1911 with Dennis Eadie at the Royalty Theatre, and later still at the Kingsway Theatre.

Vedrenne's wife was Phyllis Blair.
