= Fanlac =

- Commune
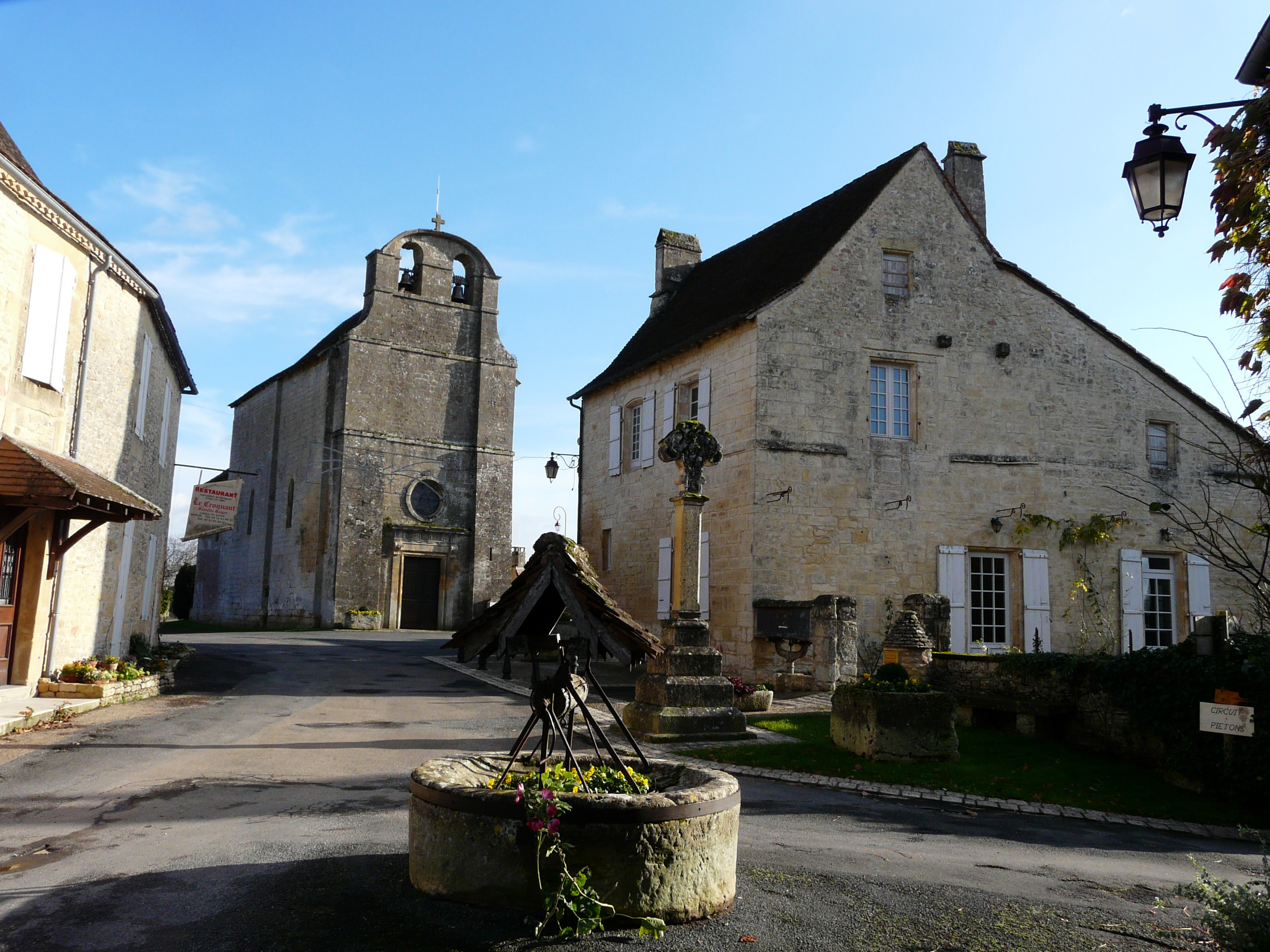
- The church and surroundings in Fanlac
- Location of Fanlac
- Location within France Location within Nouvelle-Aquitaine
- Coordinates: 45°04′00″N 1°05′48″E
- Country: France
- Region: Nouvelle-Aquitaine
- Department: Dordogne
- Arrondissement: Sarlat-la-Canéda
- Canton: Vallée de l'Homme
- Intercommunality: Vallée de l'Homme

Government
  - Mayor (2020–2026): Anne Roger
- Area^{1}: 14.37 km^{2} (5.55 sq mi)
- Elevation: 208 m (682 ft)
- Highest elevation: 267 m (876 ft)
- Lowest elevation: 99 m (325 ft)
- Population (2023): 134
  - Density: 9.32/km^{2} (24.2/sq mi)
- Time zone: UTC+01:00 (CET)
  - Summer (DST): UTC+02:00 (CEST)
- INSEE/Postal code: 24174 /24290
- ^{1} French Land Register data, which excludes lakes, ponds, glaciers > 1 km^{2} (0.386 sq mi or 247 acres) and river estuaries.

Fanlac (French pronunciation: [fɑ̃lak]) is a commune in the Dordogne department in Nouvelle-Aquitaine in southwestern France.

It is a small village with roads that are just wide enough for a car. During the Second World War (WWII) the local German forces brought a convoy of military vehicles into the village and murdered a local couple who were in their 70s. The house that they lived in was burnt to the ground. There are various plaques dedicated to this couple around the village.

== Geography ==
=== Location ===
Located in Périgord Noir, close to the forest of Barade, in the east of the Department of the Dordogne, the commune of Fanlac is crossed from the north to the south by the Thonac river, a small tributary of the river Vézère. It covers 14.37 km^{2} and has 131 inhabitants in 2015, a decrease of 5.07% compared to 2010, divided between the village and different farms around.

The minimum altitude, 97 or 99 meters, lies southeast downstream of the place called the Moulin d'Auberoche, where the Thonac receives its tributary the d'Auberoche stream and leaves the commune to enter Thonac. The maximum elevation with 267 or 269 meters, is located in the northeast at the place called Les Quatre Bornes, in the boundaries of three other communes, Bars, Auriac-du-Périgord and Montignac.

The village, away from the main roads, lies, as the crow flies, five kilometres west of Montignac and nine kilometres south of Thenon. House are typically built in white stones. The roofs are covered with flat tiles or on some houses, slate. Many of the houses in the village are secondary residences whose shutters begin to open as early as spring.

Within a few kilometres, access to the municipality can be made from the departmental roads D31 (to the north-west), D45 (to the South), D67 (to the north) or D706 (to the southeast). The communal territory is crossed by the GR 36 hiking trail.

=== Population ===
Historical population
Year	Pop.	±% p.a.
1968	170	—
1975	144	−2.34%
1982	147	+0.29%
1990	158	+0.91%
1999	142	−1.18%
2007	142	+0.00%
2012	130	−1.75%
2017	139	+1.35%
2023	134	−0.61%
Source: INSEE

== Toponymy ==
The municipality would derive its name from Famulus, Gallo-Roman character name, or Gallic Fanula, followed by the suffix -acum, indicating the domain of Famulus, or that of Fanula. In French as in Limousin Occitan, the name of the commune is written in the same way. The inhabitants of the commune are called the Fanlacois and the Fanlacoises.

== History ==
The first known written mention of the place dates from the 13th century in the form Fallacum. The village church was built in the 12th century and a convent of Benedictine nuns was founded in 1625. In the Middle Ages, Fanlac was a parish dependent on the Castellan of Montignac.

From the end of the 17th to the 19th century, Fanlac was on the road of cannons. This route starts from the la Forge d'Ans where cannons were made to arrive at the pier at Moustier.

In the cemetery of the commune has the tomb of the Lostanges family, that has its origins in the commune of Lostanges in Corrèze.

=== Second World War ===
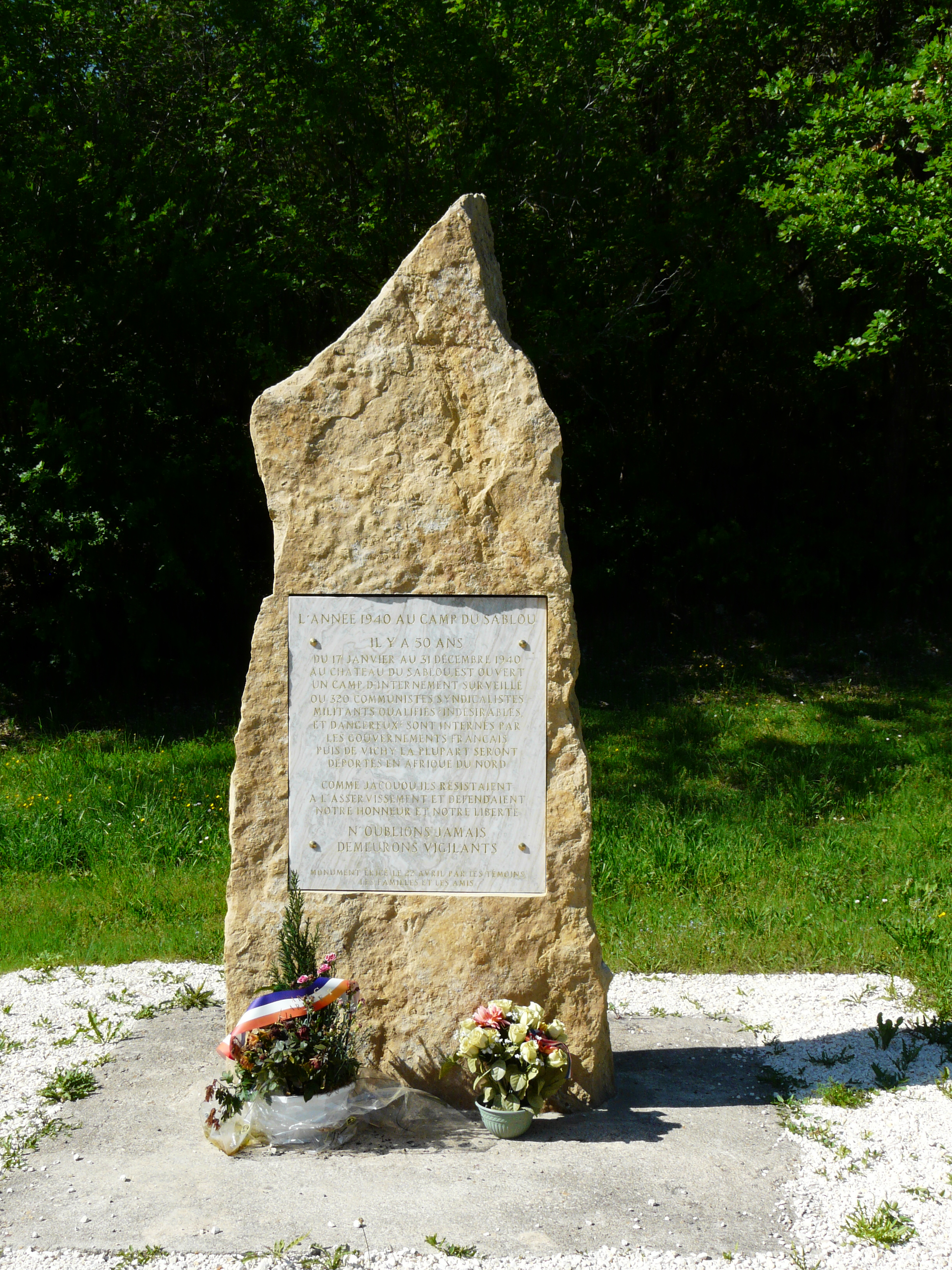
The stele du Sablou.

The Château du Sablou was an internment camp for the "undesirable French Communists", Alsatian autonomists and Gypsies during 1940. A stele commemorates this event along the road between Fanlac and Montignac.

In addition, an isolated farm became a gathering place of the French Resistance. Its owners, who had left the premises before, paid with their lives for their help provided to the Marquis. Gabriel and Jeanne Aubarbier lived in Lespicerie, an old farmhouse in the forest, west of the village, going towards le Bos de Plazac. None of their children wished to return to the farm, so feeling too isolated, they decided in 1941 to leave their farm and settle in the village of Fanlac. The farm was therefore unoccupied.

At the end of 1942, at the beginning of 1943, the Resistance began to form in Dordogne as elsewhere in France. Lespicerie, because of its geographical location, quickly appeared as a strategic place to hide. The Resistance fighters informed Gabriel Aubarbier of their intention, and he could not refuse. The farm became a training school of the Francs-Tireurs et Partisans. This place was of paramount importance, with many resistance fighters finding training before joining other areas of resistance.

The winter of 1943-1944 was fatal. The chimney that warmed the Marquis also allowed to smoke to escape which was then visible to the surrounding hillsides and some neighbours of these hillsides denounced the Marquis. It was then that on 20 March 1944, a convoy of German soldiers arrived at Fanlac. The Lespicerie farm was discovered and immediately bombarded, but the resistance fighters had time to escape.

The German soldiers then came to the village, encircling the whole town. The Fanlacois were frightened, cloistered in their houses. The Germans carried out a search and plundered all the houses in the search of the so-called "terrorists". Finding nothing, the German soldiers left in the morning but returned in the afternoon and were directed to the Aubarbier couple, who were killed. Then the German soldiers set fire to the house, burnt the bodies and before leaving requisitioned a few men stop the fire so that it spread no further.

Two plaques honour the memory of the Aubarbier couple: one on the western facade of the church, the other on the wall of their burnt house in the village of Fanlac.

=== Filming of Jacquou le Croquant ===
The village of Fanlac was revealed to the general public following the broadcast of the 1969 TV mini-series Jacquou le Croquant, a film adaptation by Stellio Lorenzi based on the work of Eugène Le Roy. Shooting a film at Fanlac at the time proved to be an entertainment for its inhabitants, and the Fanlacois were numerous among the extras. Following the broadcast of the mini-series, many tourists visited the village, questioning "where is the house of Jacquou?", a question that has been asked again and again. Of this famous house, there is nothing left today.

== Local culture and heritage ==
=== Places and monuments ===
- Château d'Auberoche of the 14th and 17th centuries, inscribed as historical monuments since 1962.
- Château du Sablou, 17th to 19th century. From January to December 1940, it served as internment camp for communist militants. Below the castle, near the bridge of Fanlac on the Thonac, a stele commemorates this episode of the World War II.
- The ancient Eglise Notre-Dame-de-la-Nativité, then known as the Eglise de la Décollation-de-Saint-Jean-Baptiste, is a fortified Romanesque church dating from the 12th century and reworked in the 17th and 18th centuries. On the left side is a sculpture in the wall, depicting Jean de La Jalage, who had his arm cut by a hatchet when defending the building against the English during the Hundred Years' War. Curiously, the stone comprising the sculpture of his arm is located inside the Château d'Auberoche, private property located in the valley of Fanlac. The church has been listed as a historic monument since 1970.
- The village also has a 14th-century Calvary Cross listed as a historic monument since 1948 and an old well with the curbstone worn by the ropes of the buckets. As an anecdote, it is said that an underground gallery leaves from under the church passing under the well going to the Château d'Auberoche.
- At the entrance of the village, from Bars, there is a road cross. Two other crosses of this type are located in the village following the great hiking trail GR 36.
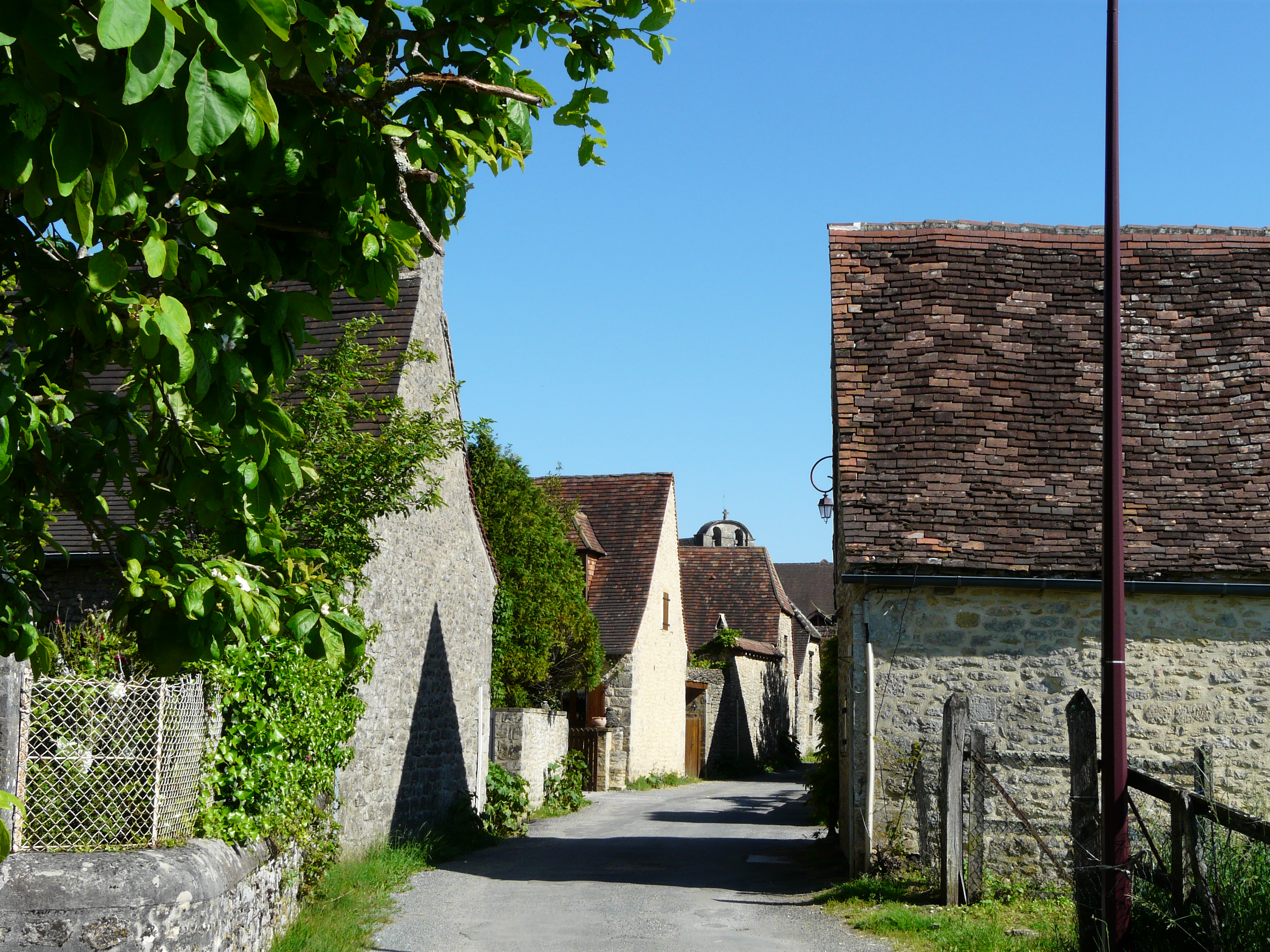
A road in the village of Fanlac.

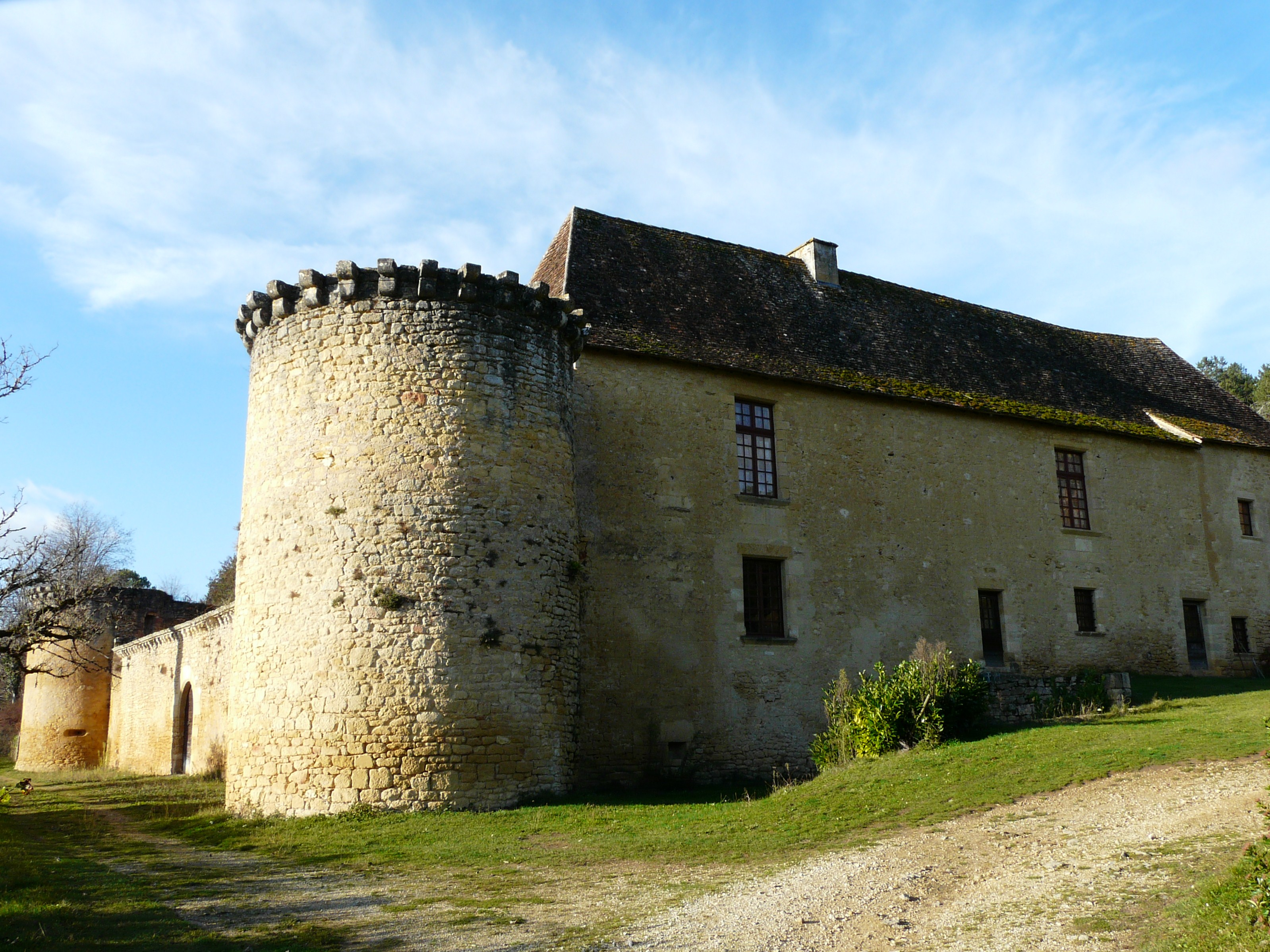
Le château d'Auberoche.

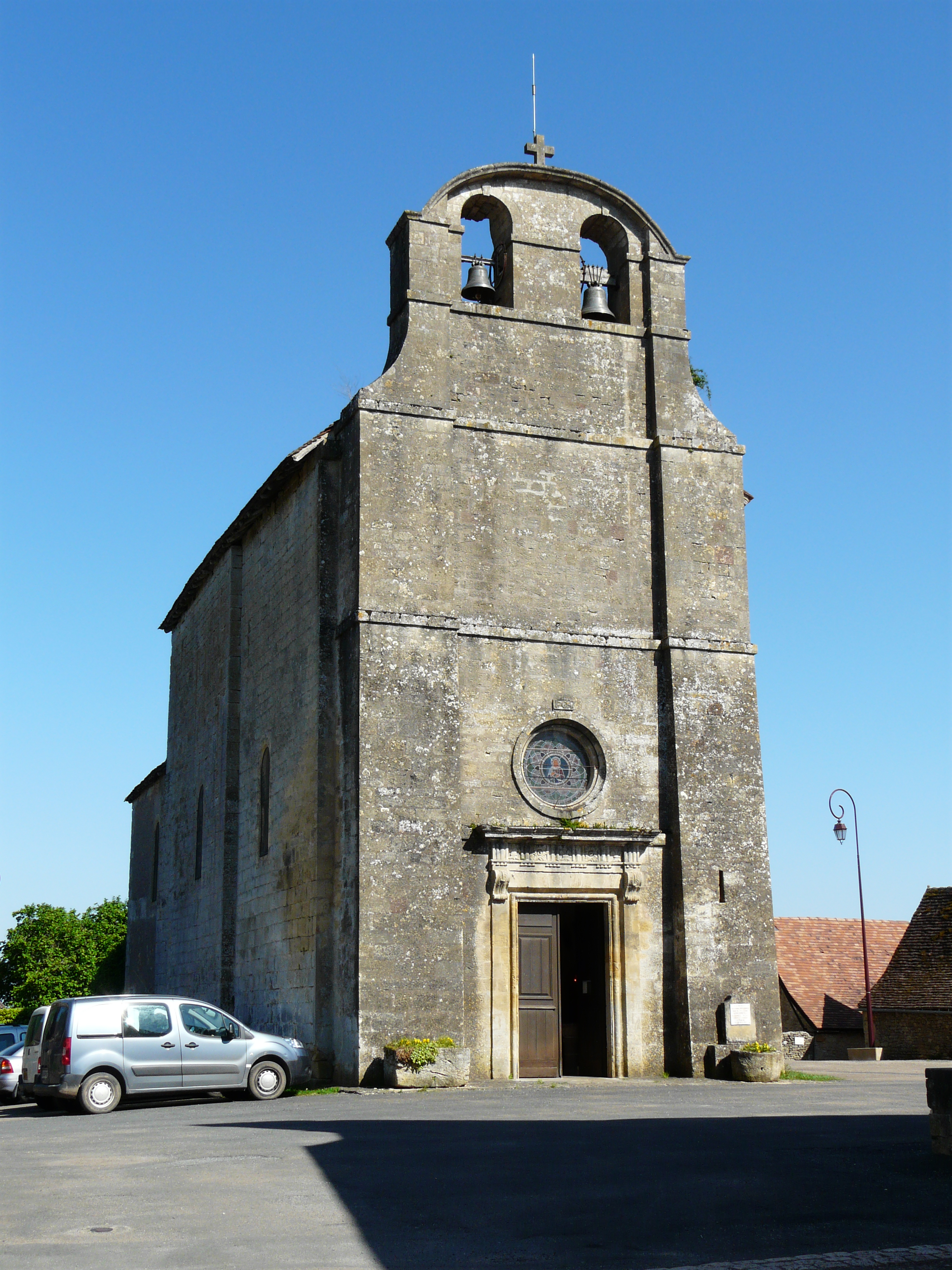
Church.

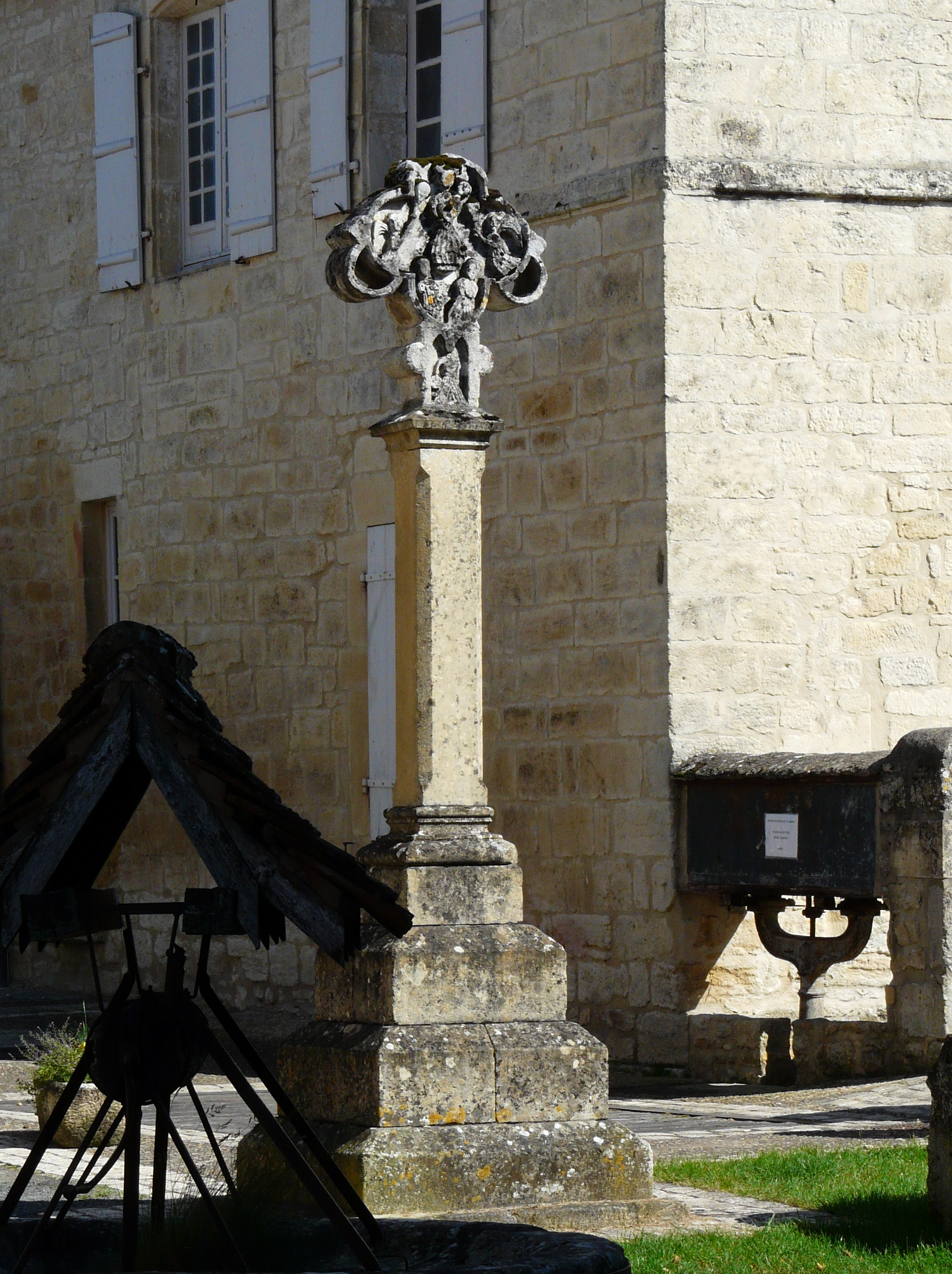
The carved cross of the 14th Century.

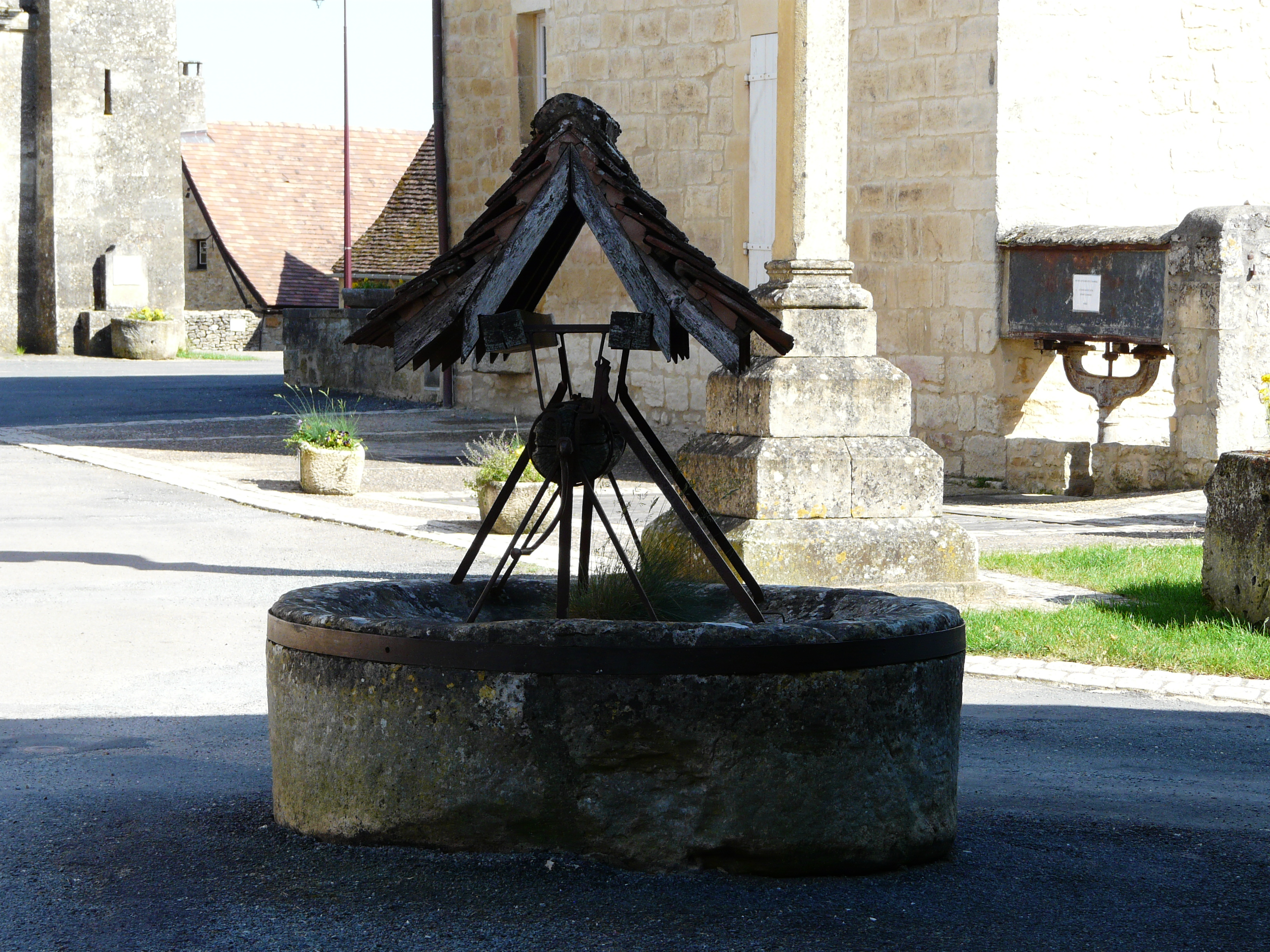
Village well.

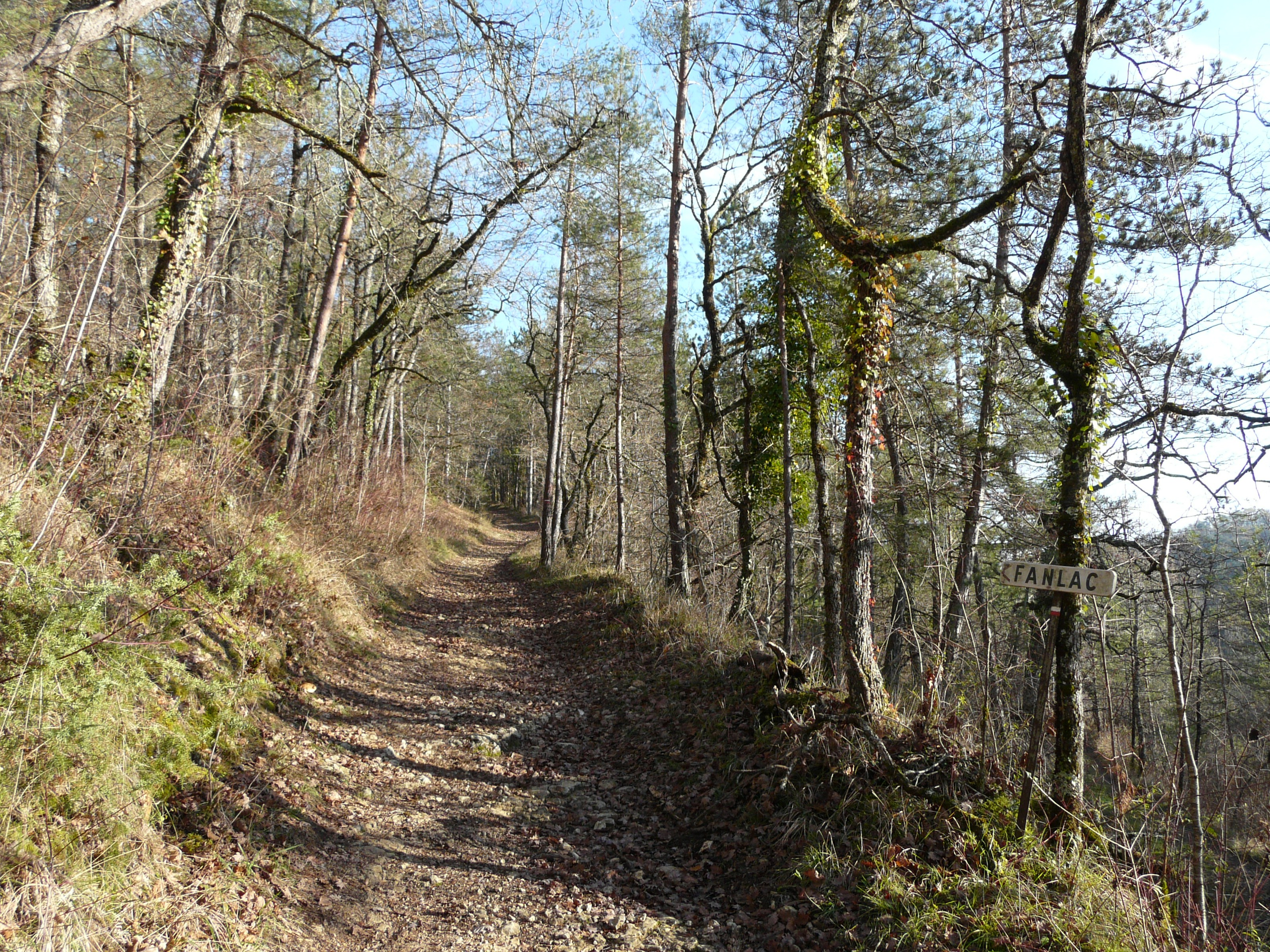
The GR 36 trail, close to the Château d'Auberoche.

=== Urban heritage ===
Fourteen hectares of the village of Fanlac has been registered since 1971 for its picturesque interest.

== Politics and administration ==
=== Administrative and electoral affiliations ===
From 1790, the municipality of Fanlac was attached to the canton of Montignac which relied on the district of Montignac until 1795, when the districts were abolished. In 1801, the canton relied on the arrondissement of Sarlat (now the arrondissement of Sarlat-la-Canéda in 1965).

In the context of the 2014 reform, defined by the decree of 21 February 2014, the canton disappeared in the departmental elections of March 2015. The municipality is now attached to the Communauté de communes de la Vallée de l'Homme whose central office remains in Montignac.

=== Intercommunality ===
At the end of 2001, Fanlac was incorporated, from its inception, in the Communauté de communes de la Vallée de la Vézère. It is dissolved on 31 December 2013 and replaced on 1 January 2014 by the Communauté de communes de la Vallée de l'Homme.

=== Municipal administration ===
With the population of the municipality between 100 and 499 inhabitants in the census of 2011, eleven municipal councillors were elected in 2014.

== Personalities related to the municipality ==
- Eugène le Roy (1836-1907), a writer, largely relies on the action of his main novel, Jacquou le Croquant, in Fanlac.

== See also ==
- Communes of the Dordogne department
