= Jureur =

Clergy swearing the 1790 oath in France

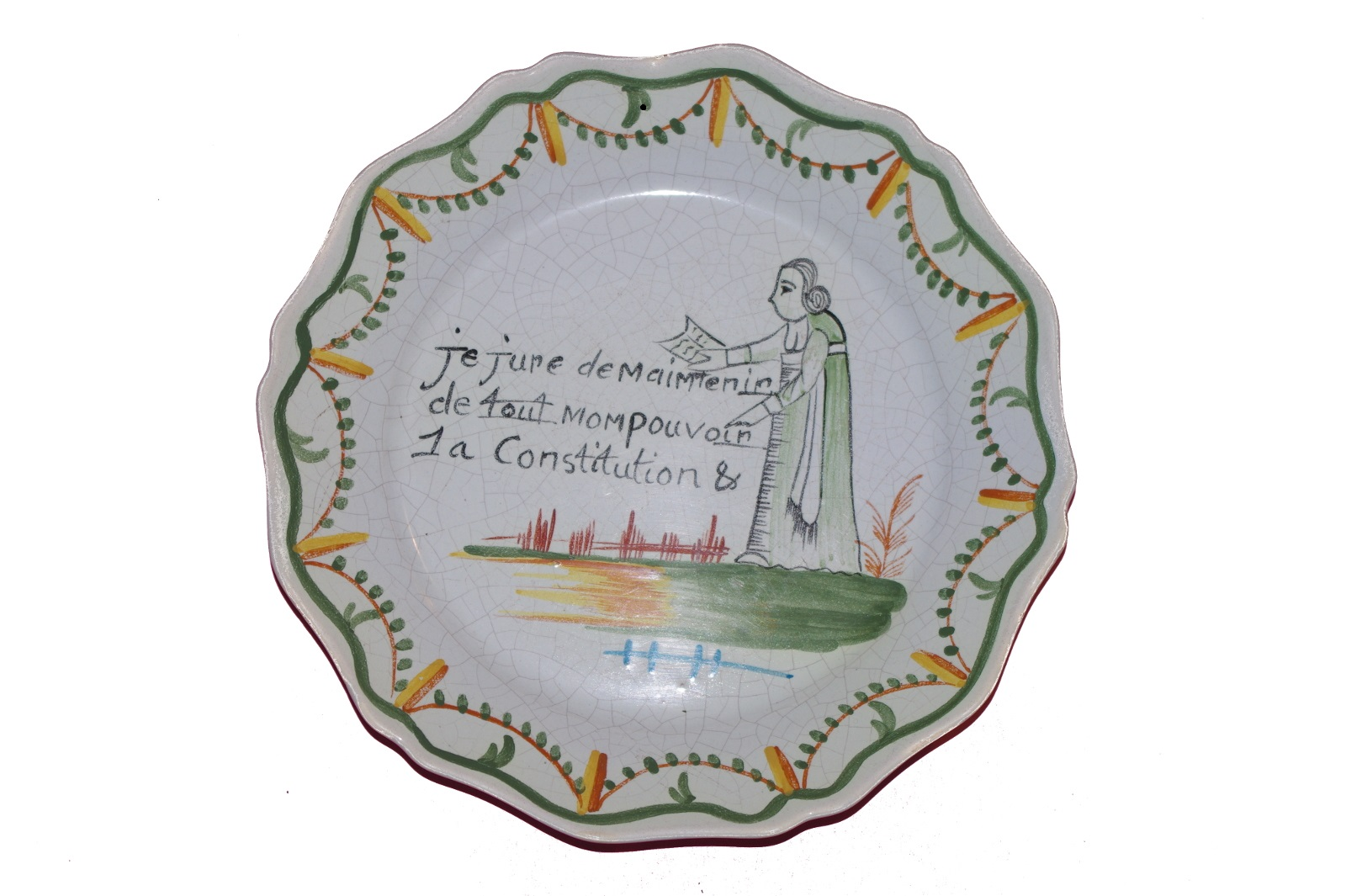
A commemorative plate featuring a juring priest.

During the French Revolution, Catholic clergy in France who agreed to swear an oath to the Civil Constitution of the Clergy were called prêtres jureurs (English: "juring priests"). They were regarded as traitors to the faith by many Catholics, including the pope and Queen Marie Antoinette—who famously refused to confess to a juring priest while on the gallows for her execution, thinking it would be an invalid sacrament.

== History of the term ==
The term was used pejoratively in the Catholic clergy to refer to priests who took an oath to the Civil Constitution of the Clergy on July 10, 1790. Pope Pius VI, in an instruction of September 26, 1791, and in an apostolic letter of March 19, 1792, forbade the faithful to receive communion, the sacrament of marriage, or any other sacrament from the hands of a parish priest or other juring priest, except for baptism in case of urgent necessity and when there is no priest nearby with legitimate authority. He also forbade the faithful to attend Mass, public prayer, or any other ceremony held by a juring priest and forbids non-juring priests to have any relationship with them in the spiritual order. A juring priest who assumes a function in the spiritual order was regarded an "intruder", a "rebel".

To the question of whether a member of the faithful could assist or act as godfather in a baptism performed by a juring priest, the papal instruction answered: "No to both questions: for the reason that this jureur, this intruder, is certainly schismatic; their schism is notorious". The Pope recommended that jureurs should no longer be admitted to the clergy unless they were completely recantation and underwent severe penance; some bishops went so far as to definitively refuse any reconciliation to "schismatics". In Catholic regions, especially in western France, jureurs were ostracized by the faithful and sometimes driven out by peasants with pitchforks.

Famously, Queen Marie Antoinette refused to confess to a juring priest while on the gallows for her execution, convinced by the papal instruction that it would be invalid sacrament.

The Concordat of July 15, 1801, concluded between the representatives of Napoleon Bonaparte, the First Consul, and Pope Pius VII, put an end to the rift between the sworn clergy ("jureur") and the refractory clergy (who had refused to take the oath). The First Consul wanted this regulation to be applied immediately and so, on May 8, 1802, the minister Portalis wrote to the "civil archbishops and bishops", asking them to choose one of their vicars from the constitutional clergy and "a third or a quarter" of their parish priests and canons from this clergy. This instruction provoked the indignation of priests like Jean Brion, parish priest of Cirières in the Deux-Sèvres region: "Gentlemen, if the 'citizen-bishop' of Poitiers (...) sends me a juring priest to check my accounts, I will throw the odious character out of the door!"

Most constitutional bishops submitted to Rome, however, some constitutional priests refused what would appear to be an absolution or retraction, believing that their oath to the civil constitution did not put them in conflict with their faith. On the other hand, refractory priests such as Jean-Charles de Coucy, Bishop of La Rochelle, rejected the Concordat, which would put juring priests on an equal footing with non-juring priests: this refusal gave rise to an anti-concordat schism, the "Petite Église".

== Fiction ==
=== Novels ===
- In Ninety-three by Victor Hugo, published in 1874, a scene describes the expulsion of a juring priest in Brittany by peasants revolting against the Republic.
- In Jacquou le Croquant by Eugène Le Roy, published in 1899, Bonal, parish priest of Fanlac in Périgord during the Restoration, is a former juring priest: he takes in the eponymous character, a little orphaned peasant. As a model of justice and charity, he lived on the margins of the official Church.

== See also ==
- Red priests
