= Jacquou le Croquant (miniseries) =

- Genre: Historical; Drama
- Based on: Jacquou le Croquant by Eugène Le Roy
- Written by: Stellio Lorenzi and Michèle O'Glor
- Directed by: Stellio Lorenzi
- Country of origin: France
- No. of episodes: 6

Production
- Running time: 570 minutes (9h30min)

Original release
- Network: ORTF
- Release: October 4 – November 8, 1969

Jacquou le Croquant is a 1969 French miniseries in 6 episodes: five 90-minute episodes and one 120-minute episode. The series was directed by Stellio Lorenzi and aired from October 4, 1969 to November 8, 1969 on Office de radiodiffusion télévision française channel 1.

It was based on Eugène Le Roy's 1899 novel of the same name which was based on 19th-century peasant revolts in Southwest France.

== Plot ==
1819: Jacquou Féral is an 8-year-old boy in the Périgord region of France. His father, Martin Féral, also called Martissou, is a tenant farmer for the Count of Nansac, (Note: Although Le Roy used real locations and historical figures in his novel, the place Nansac and the title Count of Nansac are fictional.) who lives in Château de l'Herm and exploits peasants under contract to him. Nansac's steward, Laborie, doubles the Féral family's dues on a whim, and when his wife, Marie, successfully negotiates back to the original dues, Laborie then accuses Martin of illegally owning a hunting dog. Laborie kills the dog, his bullet ricocheting and injuring Marie, at which Martin, furious, kills Laborie. Aware of the potential consequences, Martin escapes into the nearby forest, leaving his family at the farm.

Nansac eventually has Martin Féral sent to prison, where he dies. Meanwhile, he evicts Marie and Jacquou, and seizes their sheep and remaining wheat, effectively condemning them to poverty and itinerancy. In time, Marie dies of hunger and sorrow. Jacquou, now an orphan, is taken in by the parish priest Bonnal, who gives the young man an education. As an adult, Jacquou continues fighting the injustice brought on his family, and dreams of avenging them. As increasing numbers of peasants are no longer able to survive the harsh rule of landowners, Jacquou leads a peasant rebellion against Nansac. His desire for revenge is transformed into a fight for justice, in which he proves that a simple "croquant", which means "yokel", is the equal of lords and ladies.

== Cast ==
- Eric Damain: Jacquou Féral, child
- Daniel Le Roy: Jacquou, adult
- Claude Cerval: Count of Nansac
- Simone Rieutor: Marie Féral
- Fred Ulysse: Martin Féral
- Elisabeth Wiener: Galiote de Nansac
- Paloma Matta: Lina
- Isabelle Ferrand: Bertille
- Francis Claude: Galibert
- Henri Nassiet: Bonnal parish priest
- Noël Roquevert: La Ramée
- François Vibert: Cassius
- Héléna Bossis: La Mathive
- Robert Bazil: Jean
- Lucien Barjon: Geral
- Luce Fabiole: Fantille
- Denis Manuel: Lawyer Fontgrave
- Yvon Sarray: Don Engelbert
- Fred Personne: Villar parish priest
- Étienne Several: Guilhem
- Charles Moulin: Laborie
- Jacques Danoville: Mascret
- Edmond Ardisson: Antoine
- Lucien Hubert: President
- Charles Blavette: Jansou
- Douchka: Jeannette Mion
- Maurice Bourbon: Pierre Mion
- Jeanne Hardeyn: La Mion
- Roger Desmares: Marc
- Gilles Léger: Joseph
- Maria Verdi: Madeleine
- Pascal Tersou: Le Garde
- Séverine : Hermine
- Pierre Nunzi: son of Nansac
- Vanina Wanitzki: Lina, child
- Hervé Sand: Brigadier
- Raymond Pélissier: Prosecutor
- Léonce Corne: Bars parish priest
- Marcel Dedieu: Secretary
- Martin Trévières: Gendarme
- Gérard Dournel: Clerk
- Jacques Robiolles: Jesuit
- A.M. Julien: Judge
- Gilbert Beugniot: Court clerk
- Pierre Duncan: Executioner
- Paul Leroyer: Bailiff
- Guy Vassal: Young man

== Production ==
- Title: Jacquou le Croquant
- Director: Stellio Lorenzi
- Written by: Stellio Lorenzi et Michèle O'Glor, based on Eugène Le Roy's novel
- Music composed by: Georges Delerue
- Photography: Roger Dormoy et Jean Graglia
- Editing: Claude Dufour et Paul Loizon
- Sets: Jacques Chalvet
- Costumes: Christiane Coste
- Sound: Jacques Merrien

== List of episodes ==
1. Les Métayers des Nansac
2. La Nuit de la Chandeleur
3. La Tuilière
4. Le Curé Bonnal
5. La Révolte de Fanlac
6. 1830

== Novel ==
Eugène Le Roy's novel of the same name was published in 1899, itself based on true events of 19th-century peasant revolts in Southwest France. The story occurs in 1815 in the Périgord region.

== Videography ==
- zone 2 : Jacquou le Croquant, May 15, 2002, ASIN B00006471B
- zone 2 : Jacquou le croquant, TF1 Vidéo, 2002, 3 DVDs, EAN 3-384442-021654.
