= Fred Ulysse =

French actor (c.1934–2020)

- Born: c. 1934
- Died: 24 October 2020; Paris, France
- Occupation: Actor

Fred Ulysse (c. 1934 – 24 October 2020) was a French actor. He was known for his role of Martin Féral, father of Jacquou le Croquant in the television series Jacquou le Croquant, based on the novel of the same name by Eugène Le Roy.

== Filmography ==
=== Films ===
- Cause toujours, mon lapin (1961)
- Le Temps des loups (1970) as Jean
- Mais toi, tu es Pierre (1973)
- Raging Fists (1975)
- I Am Pierre Riviere (1976)
- Le Mors aux dents (1979)
- Moon in the Gutter (1983)
- Tout le monde peut se tromper (1983)
- Rouget le braconnier (1989)
- Germinal (1993)
- Le Péril jeune (1994)
- To Matthieu (2000)
- Vidocq (2001)
- Son frère (2003)
- L'Ennemi naturel (2004)
- 13 Tzameti (2005)
- Les Poings serrés (2005)
- Nos retrouvailles (2007)
- Rivals (2008)
- Making Plans for Lena (2009)
- My Piece of the Pie (2011)
- Les Yeux de sa mère (2011)
- La Traque (2011)
- L'Odeur de la mandarine (2015)
- The House by the Sea (2017)
- Persona non grata (2019)
- Only the Animals (2019)

=== Television ===
- La Princesse du rail (1967)
- Jacquou le Croquant (1969)
- Que ferait donc Faber ? (1969)
- Les Cinq Dernières Minutes (1972)
- Sans Famille (1981)
- Messieurs les jurés (1986)
- Intrigues (1990)
- L'Instit (1998)
- L'Été rouge (2002)
- Le Père Amable (2007)
- L'Homme de la berge (2010)
- Rituels meutrieurs (2011)
- Intime Conviction (2014)
- Au revoir... et à bientôt ! (2015)
