= Jacquou le Croquant =

2007 film by Laurent Boutonnat

- French release poster
- Directed by: Laurent Boutonnat
- Based on: Jacquou le Croquant by Eugène Le Roy
- Produced by: Dominique Boutonnat; Jean-Claude Fleury; Romain Le Grand
- Starring: Gaspard Ulliel; Marie-Josée Croze; Albert Dupontel; Jocelyn Quivrin; Tchéky Karyo; Malik Zidi; Olivier Gourmet
- Cinematography: Olivier Cocaul
- Edited by: Stan Collet
- Music by: Laurent Boutonnat
- Distributed by: Pathé
- Release date: 17 January 2007
- Running time: 140 minutes
- Country: France
- Language: French
- Box office: $6.7 million

Jacquou le Croquant is a 2007 French historical film, based on the 1899 novel of the same name by Eugène Le Roy. Set in the Dordogne during the Bourbon Restoration, it tells the story of a young peasant who leads a revolt against an evil nobleman. It was nominated for two César Awards in 2008.

== Plot ==
1815. Jacquou, a young peasant from the Périgord region, lives happily with his parents. Misfortune falls upon the family when Jacquou's father is hunted for killing servants of a cruel and arrogant nobleman, the Count of Nansac. Jacquou's father flees the town but promises his son that he will join the family soon. Jacquou is acquainted with Galiote, Nansac's daughter, and her care-taker Lina when his mother works as a laundry maid at Nansac's castle with her identity untold. Jacquou at first tries to harm Galiote by letting pigs out of the pen as she throws pebbles at them, leaving the pigs agitated. However he changes his mind and saves her, leaving both Lina and Galiote impressed and grateful. Soon after this incident Jacquou's mother loses her job and is forced to leave the house with Jacquou. To make everything worse, all her attempts to save her husband fail as well. Jacquou's father is then captured, tried and executed in prison. Upon this knowledge, she makes Jacquou swear to avenge his father's death. Jacquou's mother soon succumbs to a combination of grief, starvation and exposure.

Having no one to take care of him, Jacquou begs on the streets alongside other children whom he befriends over time. And one cold winter night, Jacquou decides to kill himself by freezing to death (like his mother) in a cemetery beside a church. The unexpected hoots of an owl (in the middle of the night) alert the local priest, who with his friend, the physician, comes to the boy's rescue. Jacquou grows up under their protection and works as an altar boy.

After Jacquou becomes an adult, he has his first confrontation with Nansac at a dance competition. Nansac shows up with his gang of servants, uninvited, and ruins the festive mood among the people. His daughter Galiote joins his father as well and it is revealed that she has a secret longing for Jacquou for having saved her life. Jacquou humiliates Nansac and defies his authority in front of townspeople. Infuriated Nansac soon has his men capture Jacquou and pushes him into the underground well to die. Nevertheless, Jacquou manages to get out, finding a room filled with firearms in the process, and plots with his friends to overthrow Nansac. When he returns home, Jacquou finds Galiote in his home, who came in to avoid the rain. Although Jacquou orders her to get out at first, he soon softens and gives her some of his dry clothes before telling her to go home. When Galiote gets out of his house she is faced with an angry mob and narrowly escapes their hands.

Jacquou attacks Nansac's castle while a group of his men goes in to secure the weapons he discovered earlier. Many of Nansac's servants are killed by hidden marksmen and the nobles find themselves cornered. Jacquou fights Nansac alone and defeats him. When people urge him to kill Nansac, Jacquou responds that he would rather see him deteriorate miserably. When the castle is lit on fire and everyone seems to have gotten out, the nobles notice that Galiote is still in her room. Jacquou returns to save her and hands her over to Nansac. At the end of the night Jacquou thanks the townspeople for helping him but tells them not to be involved any further as they will probably be executed.

Some time later Jacquou is seen at the court as he faces charge of rioting and sexually assaulting Galiote, brought on by Nansac. However Galiote testifies in favor of Jacquou and swears that he never touched her. Jacquou is freed and Nansac, impoverished and homeless, tastes another defeat.

Near the end Jacquou's friends tells him that Galiote is about to leave the town in search of work. Persuaded by Lina, Jacquou goes to bid adieu. He is finally reconciled with Galiote as he hugs her.

== Cast ==
- Gaspard Ulliel as Jacquou
  - Léo Legrand as Jacquou (child)
- Marie-Josée Croze as Jacquou's mother
- Albert Dupontel as Jacquou's father
- Jocelyn Quivrin as The Count of Nansac
- Tchéky Karyo as The Chevalier
- Malik Zidi as Touffu
  - Vincent Valladon as Touffu (child)
- Olivier Gourmet as Monk Bonal
- Judith Davis as Lina
  - Clémence Gautier as Lina (child)
- Dora Doll as Fantille
- Jérôme Kircher as The lawyer
- Renan Carteaux as Baron Vallière
- Jeff Esperansa as Mario

== Production ==
Shooting of the film took place from 1 February 2005 to 15 September 2005.

== Reception ==
Variety gave the film a positive review, praising it as "feisty family fare" with "pleasingly Dickensian" themes. Characterizing the film as a "handsomely mounted, old-fashioned mini-epic", Variety singled out its cinematography for praise: "Painterly widescreen lensing wins the day. Shot in the burnished fields and rustic outcroppings of France and Romania, with a preference for classy amber and ochre tones, many scenes look like vintage etchings or oil paintings."

== Awards and nominations ==
The film was nominated for two César Awards in 2008.

- Best Production Design - Christian Marti (nominee)
- Best Costume Design - Jean-Daniel Vuillermoz (nominee)

== Related articles ==
- Coderc Plaza
