= Classe tous risques =

1960 film

Classe Tous Risques
- Directed by: Claude Sautet
- Written by: Claude Sautet; José Giovanni; Pascal Jardin
- Based on: Classe tous risques by José Giovanni
- Produced by: Jean Darvey
- Starring: Lino Ventura; Sandra Milo; Jean-Paul Belmondo
- Cinematography: Ghislain Cloquet
- Edited by: Albert Jurgenson
- Music by: Georges Delerue
- Production companies: Mondex Films; Les Films Odéon; Filmsonor; Zebra Films
- Distributed by: Cinédis
- Release date: 23 March 1960
- Running time: 104 minutes
- Countries: France; Italy
- Languages: French; Italian
- Box office: 1,726,839 admissions (France)

Classe tous risques ([klas tu ʁisk]; literally "All-Risk Class", but also a pun on the French expression "Classe Touriste", Economy Class), which was first released in the United States as The Big Risk, is a 1960 French-Italian gangster film directed by Claude Sautet and starring Lino Ventura, Jean-Paul Belmondo and Sandra Milo. An adaptation of the novel of the same name by José Giovanni, who collaborated with Sautet and Pascal Jardin on the screenplay, the film tells the story of a French mobster on the run with his family, who returns to Paris with help from a new criminal acquaintance and confronts the members of his old gang.

Now widely considered a masterpiece, at the time of its release, the film was somewhat overshadowed by the French New Wave. However, it did influence French cinema, especially Jean-Pierre Melville's subsequent work.

== Plot ==
Years after gangster Abel Davos fled France with his wife, Thérèse, and two sons, his money is running out and the Italian police are closing in on him, so he decides that, although he was tried in absentia and sentenced to death in France, it is time to return home. He puts Thérèse and his sons on a train to Ventimiglia at the Milano Centrale railway station and then, with his friend Raymond Naldi, robs a pair of bank couriers before heading to Ventimiglia himself, barely making it past a roadblock on the way out of Milan. The robbery did not yield as much money as expected, so, to enter France, Abel steals a boat in Sanremo and lands with his family and Raymond at night in Menton, but they are surprised by two customs officers, and there is a shootout. Raymond, Thérèse, and both of the officers are killed, setting off a massive police manhunt.

Abel and his boys make it to Nice, where Abel calls Henri "Riton" Vintran, a member of his old gang, in Paris and asks him to contact their former partners Raoul Fargier and Jean "Jeannot" Martin and come get him. Although Abel once provided the money for Riton to open his bistro and got Fargier, who now owns a hotel, out of jail, neither man wants to risk his now-comfortable life by getting too involved with Abel, and they convince Jeannot, who would like to retrieve Abel, that he should not go either, as he is out on bail. Instead, they buy an ambulance and recruit Éric Stark, a good-natured young gangster who is a stranger to them, to do the job.

After a couple of days, the owner of the rooming house to which Riton sent Abel kicks him out due to the increased police presence in the area, and Abel and his boys end up sleeping on the beach. He is glad when Éric, who says he knew Raymond, arrives, though he is disappointed his friends did not come themselves. On the way to Paris, Éric saves a young actress named Liliane from her tour manager and offers her a ride, and she agrees to pose as a nurse for Abel, who is wrapped in fake bandages, to help get through any police roadblocks they come across.

When Fargier suggests sending Abel out of town to live with one of his cousins, Abel accuses his friends of trying to get rid of him and angrily storms out of Riton's bistro. He sends his sons to live with Chapuis, a friend of his father, and goes to stay in the separate maid's room that comes with Éric's apartment. Éric starts to date Liliane while he arranges to get Abel a forged passport and offers to work with Abel, but Abel says he is just doing one last job to get some money for himself and his sons and going overseas. All he can think to do is rob Arthur Gibelin, an interior decorator who fences stolen jewels, and when Fargier hears about this, he worries he might be next.

Éric catches a private detective who is following him to locate Abel, and Abel discovers Gibelin hired the man. He tricks Gibelin into meeting him and gets the fence to admit Fargier had revealed Éric might know where he was hiding. Abel kills Gibelin and then Fargier, whose wife dies of shock, and Riton agrees to cooperate with the police, who storm Eric's building. Éric tries to warn Abel and is shot in the leg, which alerts Abel and allows him to escape. Jeannot, feeling guilty, helps Abel and finds out where Riton is hiding, but Abel says he is no longer interested, as his actions have already caused too many unintended deaths and injuries. He gives Jeannot some money to get Éric a lawyer and sends his old friend away.

As Abel walks down a crowded Parisian sidewalk, voice-over narration explains that he was arrested a few days later and subsequently tried, sentenced, and executed.

== Cast ==
- Lino Ventura as Abel Davos, a criminal on the run with his wife and two small sons
- Sandra Milo as Liliane, a young actress who begins to date Éric
- Jean-Paul Belmondo as Éric Stark, a young, solitary gangster who is sent to pick up Abel
- Marcel Dalio as Arthur Gibelin, an interior decorator and criminal fence
- Michel Ardan as Henri "Riton la Porte" Vintran, a member of Abel's old gang, who now owns a bistro
- Claude Cerval as Raoul Fargier, a member of Abel's old gang, who now owns a hotel
- Jacques Dacqmine as Commissaire Blot, who is in charge of the search for Abel
- Simone France as Thérèse Davos, Abel's wife
- Michèle Méritz as Sophie Fargier, Fargier's wife
- Stan Krol as Raymond Naldi, Abel's friend and accomplice in Italy
- Evelyne Ker as Gibelin's step-daughter and secretary
- Betty Schneider as the young woman who works for the doctor on the fourth floor of Éric's building
- France Asselin as Denise Vintran, Riton's wife
- Jean-Pierre Zola as Bacérès, director of Agence Péreire, a private detective agency
- Sylvain Levignac as Jacques Imbert, one of Agence Péreire's detectives
- Jeanne Pérez as Jacqueline Chapuis, Chapuis' sister
- René Génin as Chapuis, a friend of Abel's father who works at the National Maritime Museum and takes in Abel's sons
- Charles Blavette as Bénazet, who runs a rooming house in Nice
- Philippe March (credited as Aimé de March) as Jean "Petit Jeannot" Martin, a member of Abel's old gang, who has been in and out of jail
- Corrado Guarducci as Ferucci, who helps Abel figure out how to sneak back into France
- Robert Desnoux as Pierrot, Abel and Thérèse's older son
- Thierry Lavoye as Daniel, Abel and Thérèse's younger son
- Jean Combal as one of the police inspectors working with Blot (uncredited)
- Marcel Bernier as one of the police inspectors working with Blot (uncredited)
- Bernard Dhéran as the tour manager of Liliane's traveling theatrical troupe (uncredited)
- Max Amyl as the director of Liliane's play (uncredited)

== Production ==
The character of Abel Davos was based on a real person named Abel Danos (known as "Le Mammouth" because of his girth), who writer José Giovanni had met in prison. From 1941 to 1944, Danos was a henchman for the Carlingue, and after World War II he was convicted of collaboration and sentenced to death. He was shot on 13 March 1952.

France's Mondex Films, Les Films Odéon, and Filmsonor, in collaboration with Italy's Zebra Films, produced the film. Principal photography took place from 7 October to 8 December 1959, and included locations in Nice, Paris, and Milan.

== Release ==
The film was released on 23 March 1960 in France, where it recorded 1,726,839 admissions.

== Reception ==
In a 2005 review of the re-release of the film, A. O. Scott of The New York Times wrote: "Claude Sautet's Classe Tous Risques is the kind of French movie that makes you want to throw on your trench coat, light up a cigarette and shoot somebody. Originally released in 1960, it was lost in the frenzy of the Nouvelle Vague, which made its straightforward use of genre look a bit old-fashioned. [...] It is worth seeking out, not only because Classe Tous Risques represents a missing piece of film history - a link between the great postwar policiers and the brooding 1960's gangster dramas of Jean-Pierre Melville - but because it is a tough and touching exploration of honor and friendship among thieves." Kenneth Turan of Los Angeles Times wrote in 2006 that "To come across Classe Tous Risques is like discovering a bottle of marvelous French wine you didn't remember you had, opening it and finding it every bit as delicious as its reputation promised."
