= Claude Cerval =

French actor (1921–1972)

- Born: 21 February 1921; Paris, France
- Died: 25 July 1972 (aged 51); Paris, France
- Occupation: Actor
- Years active: 1955–1971

Claude Cerval (21 February 1921 – 25 July 1972) was a French film actor. He appeared in more than forty films from 1955 to 1971.

== Biography ==
After his secondary studies, he took drama lessons with, among others, Louis Jouvet. He then performed in cabarets and at the theater, notably at the Odéon, before joining the Théâtre national populaire. He worked in cinema and television as well. He was well remembered for his performance in the role of the detestable Count of Nansac in the ORTF series Jacquou le Croquant in 1969.

He died of heart failure at the age of 51.

== Filmography ==
Film
Year	Title	Role	Notes
1955	À toi de jouer... Callaghan!!!		Uncredited
1955	Un missionnaire		
1956	Bob le flambeur	Jean - le croupier	
1957	La ironía del dinero	Andrés	(segment "Francia"), Uncredited
1957	Marchands de filles	René	
1958	Le Beau Serge	The priest	
1959	Les Cousins	Jean Dalbecque dit Clovis	
1960	Classe Tous Risques	Raoul Fargier	
1960	The Love Game	Le consommateur	
1960	L'ennemi dans l'ombre	Nilpiker	
1960	Le bal des espions	Zarkho Solin	
1960	Ça va être ta fête	Secret Services Director	
1962	Le Crime ne paie pas	Morin	(segment "L'affaire Hugues")
1962	L'empire de la nuit		
1963	Two Are Guilty	Plouzenec	
1963	Ophelia	Adrien Lesurf	
1963	Any Number Can Win	Le commissaire de police	
1963	Symphonie pour un massacre		
1963	Les Saintes-Nitouches	Clauval	
1963	Germinal	Victor Maigrat	
1963	Le commissaire mène l'enquête	Marnay	(segment "Geste d'un fanatique")
1964	Coplan, agent secret FX 18	Barter	
1965	Crime on a Summer Morning	Jean-Pierre 'Pierrot' - le pigeon	
1965	That Man in Istanbul	Brandt	Uncredited
1965	Les Chiens dans la nuit	Manolis	
1966	The Upper Hand	René	
1967	Une femme aux abois	Ferry	
1967	Belle de Jour		
1967	La peur et l'amour	Louie Ricco	
1968	Le démoniaque	Joe Kerr	
1968	Béru et ces dames	Vérian	
1969	The Milky Way	Brigadier	
1970	Borsalino	Le frère Pradel #1	(scenes deleted)
1971	To Die of Love	Le juge d'instruction	
1971	Angel's Leap	Marc Orsini	
1971	La saignée		(final film role)

TV
Year	Title	Role	Notes
1969	Jacquou le Croquant	Le Comte de Nansac	6 episodes
