= Les Cousins (film) =

- Film poster
- Directed by: Claude Chabrol
- Written by: Paul Gégauff (dialogue)
- Story by: Claude Chabrol
- Produced by: Claude Chabrol
- Starring: Gérard Blain; Jean-Claude Brialy; Juliette Mayniel
- Cinematography: Henri Decaë
- Edited by: Jacques Gaillard
- Music by: Paul Misraki
- Distributed by: Les Films Marceau (France)
- Release date: 11 March 1959
- Running time: 112 minutes
- Country: France
- Language: French

Les Cousins (English: The Cousins) is a 1959 French New Wave drama film directed by Claude Chabrol. It tells a story about two cousins, the decadent Paul, played by Jean-Claude Brialy, and the naïve Charles, played by Gérard Blain. The film won the Golden Bear at the 9th Berlin International Film Festival.

== Plot ==
The naïve, innocent, and idealistic Charles, who is from the provinces and is something of a mama's boy, moves to Paris to share his uncle's extravagant apartment with his dissolute, profligate, and jaded cousin Paul while both young men attend law school. Whereas Charles takes his studies very seriously in order to not disappoint his mother, to whom he writes daily, Paul never seems to go to lectures or open a book.

At the café where many of Paul's friends hang out during the day, Charles meets the beautiful Florence, who has a reputation for being promiscuous. She spends some time with Charles at one of Paul's raucous parties and finds him intriguing. Charles, knowing nothing of Florence's past, falls in love with her.

One day, due to a misunderstanding, Florence shows up at the apartment instead of at her appointment with Charles. She is greeted by Paul, who tries to convince her that she and Charles are not suited to each other and if they stay together she will become bored and end up cheating on Charles. Clovis, a corrupt friend of Paul's, who operates as a kind of hustler, pimp, and purveyor of bizarre entertainments, drops by and supports the issue, saying Florence's recent virtuous impulses are only fleeting and Paul is the one whom she should be with.

Charles finally comes home after having waited for Florence for two hours after his class ended. Paul and Florence tell him that Florence has decided to move into the apartment to be with Paul, not him, and Charles seems to take the news quite well, saying he will wait his turn. He begins to spend almost all of his time studying in his room, but his focus is regularly distracted by reminders that Paul and Florence are together.

Florence moves out shortly before Paul and Charles are to take an important exam, Paul the day before Charles. Paul, somehow, does not have any trouble passing and throws a big party. Florence comes and tries to talk to Charles in his room, but he says she is interrupting his studying and throws her out, after which he seems distracted by more than just the noise from the living room.

To everyone's surprise, Charles flunks his exam. He tries to go to a church, but it is closed, and the words of a friendly bookseller fail to lift his spirits, so he wanders around. Winding up at the river, he throws his school papers and student ID in the water before heading back to the apartment. Charles loads a single bullet into one of his uncle's six-chamber revolvers, spins the cylinder, and pulls the trigger while pointing the weapon at the sleeping Paul's head. The hammer clicks on an empty chamber, and Charles drops the gun and goes to bed.

In the morning, Paul tries to cheer Charles up. While he talks, he playfully picks up the revolver and pulls the trigger, as he often does. Charles frantically tries to warn Paul that the gun is loaded, but he cuts off when he is struck by the bullet and dies without saying another word. Dumbfounded, Paul struggles for a few moments to take in what has just happened. The doorbell rings and he goes to answer the door.

== Selected cast ==
- Gérard Blain as Charles
- Jean-Claude Brialy as Paul
- Juliette Mayniel as Florence
- Claude Cerval as Jean Dalbecque (known as Clovis)
- Guy Decomble as the bookseller
- Geneviève Cluny as Geneviève
- Michèle Méritz as Yvonne
- Corrado Guarducci as Count Minerva
- Stéphane Audran as Françoise
- Paul Bisciglia as Marc
- Jeanne Pérez as the cleaning lady
- Françoise Vatel as Martine
- Jean-Louis Maury as a bridge player
- André Jocelyn as Philippe

== Production ==
Chabrol had planned for The Cousins to be his first film, but the high production costs ($160,000) made him decide to postpone the project and make the less-expensive Le Beau Serge first. The two films featured the same lead actors—Gérard Blain and Jean-Claude Brialy—but many aspects of their characters and their function within the plot were reversed (for example, Brialy now played the "insider", and Blain the "outsider"). The Cousins was the first film Chabrol wrote in collaboration with Paul Gégauff.

== Style ==
The film introduced a number of elements that would soon be regarded as typically Chabrolian. It is set in a bourgeois milieu and the overall style is self-consciously polished, which recall the "Cinema of Quality" more than the New Wave. There is also a typical ambiguity about the characters. Charles' guardian angel, an idealistic bookseller, is counterbalanced by Paul's companion, the malevolent Clovis. The party scenes reveal "Chabrol's taste for the theatrical and flamboyant." The unwitting murder in the end is, seemingly, inspired by "the theme of the exchange of guilt which Chabrol and Rohmer analysed in Hitchcock."

== Reception ==
The film won the Golden Bear at the 9th Berlin International Film Festival. It had 1,816,407 admissions in France, making it the second most popular film of Chabrol's career.

Bosley Crowther commented in The New York Times that "Chabrol has more skill with the camera than he has with the pen, and his picture is more credible to the eye than it is to the skeptical mind. But it is not the less overwhelming, and it is beautifully played by much the same cast that performed for him in Le Beau Serge." Variety said that "director Chabrol has gone in for a little too much symbolism. The characters sometimes remain murky and too literary rather than real form. But a concisive progression, fine technical aspects, and a look at innocence destroyed by the profane keeps it absorbing despite the slightly pretentious treatment at times." Time called the film "a fairly clever, mildly depressing study of France's I-got-it-beat generation." Pauline Kael wrote: "The Cousins, more than any other film I can think of, deserves to be called The Lost Generation, with all the glamour and romance, the easy sophistication and quick desperation that the title suggests." TV Guide called it "a major film of the French New Wave that provides a grim, clear-eyed look at the cynicism of youth, this is not to be missed."

== See also ==
- 1959 in film
- List of French films of 1959
