= Michèle Méritz =

French actress

- Born: 24 September 1923; Paris, France
- Died: 28 May 1998 (aged 74); Carcassonne, France
- Years active: 1959–1965

Michèle Méritz (September 24, 1923 – May 28, 1998), born Micheline Rosa Mitz, was a French actress.

== Biography ==
Méritz studied at the Cours Simon during the 1950s. While acting in Claude Chabrol's Le Beau Serge, she told him a story outline about a woman who wants to have a child with her boyfriend despite not being married, which Chabrol passed on to Philippe de Broca, who used it as the basis for his first full-length film, Les Jeux de l'amour; Jean-Luc Godard, who had worked with de Broca on the script, later used it as the basis for his own 1961 film A Woman Is a Woman. In 1960, along with Gérard Lebovici, she founded the Meritz-Lebovici management agency, whose first two clients were de Broca and Jean-Pierre Cassel; in 1970 it merged with the André Bernheim agency and became Artmedia.

== Selected filmography ==
Year	Title	Role	Director
1958	Le Beau Serge	Yvonne	Claude Chabrol
1959	Les Cousins	Yvonne	Claude Chabrol
1960	Classe tous risques	Sophie Fargier	Claude Sautet
1960	La Millième Fenêtre	Maggy Tourtet	Robert Ménégoz
1961	Le Rendez-vous de minuit	Christiane	Roger Leenhardt
1962	War of the Buttons	L'Aztec's mother	Yves Robert
1965	Le Temps d'apprendre à vivre	Anna	Henri Graziani
