= Jean-Claude Brialy =

French actor and director (1933–2007)

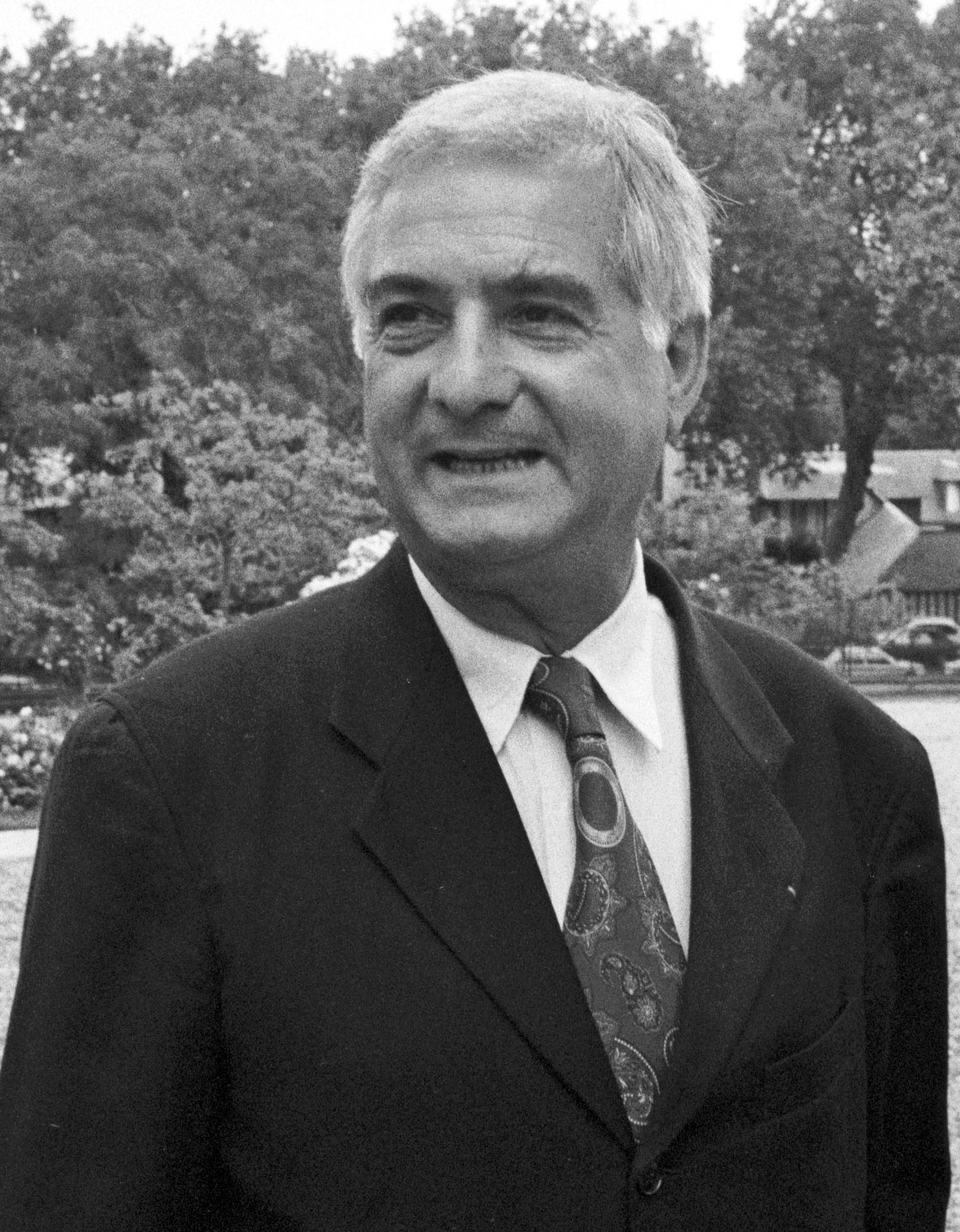
- Brialy in 1992
- Born: 30 March 1933; Aumale, French Algeria (now Sour El-Ghozlane, Algeria)
- Died: 30 May 2007 (aged 74); Monthyon, France
- Occupations: Actor; director
- Years active: 1955–2007
- Awards: César Award for Best Actor in a Supporting Role; 1987 The Innocents

Jean-Claude Brialy (30 March 1933 – 30 May 2007) was a French actor and film director.

== Early life ==
Brialy was born in Aumale (now Sour El-Ghozlane), French Algeria, where his father was stationed with the French Army. Brialy moved to mainland France with his family in 1942. He was an alumnus of the Prytanée National Militaire. When he was 21 years old, he went to Paris to work as an actor.

== Career ==
In 1956, Brialy acted in his first role in the short film Le coup du berger (Fool's Mate) by Jacques Rivette.

By the late 1950s, he'd become one of the most prolific actors in the French nouvelle vague and a star. He appeared in films of nouvelle vague directors such as Claude Chabrol (Le Beau Serge, 1958; Les Cousins, 1959), Louis Malle (Ascenseur pour l'échafaud, 1958; The Lovers, 1958), François Truffaut (The 400 Blows, 1959), Jean-Luc Godard, (A Woman Is a Woman, 1961), Éric Rohmer (Claire's Knee, 1970), as well as in films of other filmmakers such as Jean Renoir (Elena and Her Men 1958), Roger Vadim (Circle of Love, 1964), Philippe de Broca (King of Hearts, 1966), Luis Buñuel (The Phantom of Liberty, 1974), and Claude Lelouch (Robert et Robert, 1978).

Accustomed to supporting roles, he starred in Le Beau Serge in 1957, La Chambre ardente in 1962, Carambolages in 1963, L'Année sainte (with Jean Gabin) in 1976, and Julie pot de colle the following year, but never managed to establish himself as a leading man like Alain Delon or Jean-Paul Belmondo. He made up to ten films a year in the 1960s.

In 2006, he appeared in his last role, as the eponymous character of the TV film Monsieur Max, directed by Gabriel Aghion. Godard described him as "the French Cary Grant," while Brialy's self-described "life models" had reportedly been actor Sacha Guitry and director Jean Cocteau.

Brialy directed a number of films, including Églantine in 1971, which was loosely inspired by his own memories of a happy childhood spent in Chambellay with his grandparents, and Les volets clos (Closed shutters) in 1972.

He owned the restaurant L'Orangerie, on the Île Saint-Louis; he'd also worked as a TV presenter, a singer, and a radio host. During the presentation of one of his books, Brialy described himself this way: "I'm a boy who got lucky enough to do what I love in life".

== Personal life and death ==
Brialy, in 1959, acquired a château in the commune of Monthyon, near Paris. There, he accommodated and entertained many friends from the cinema and the theatre, such as Jean Marais, Pierre Arditi, and Romy Schneider whom he'd met during the 1958 production of the film Christine. Schneider, after the 1981 fatal accident of her son David, found a "refuge from the paparazzi" in Brialy's home. French singer Barbara would often sing at the piano. Director Jean-Pierre Melville used the château to shoot the last scenes of his 1970 crime film Le Cercle Rouge, where Alain Delon and Yves Montand are killed by the police.

In his books, the autobiographical Le Ruisseau des singes (The river of monkeys) (2000) and the memoir J'ai oublié de vous dire (I Forgot to Tell You) (2004), (Note: During a presentation of the book, Brialy insisted that "The lives of other people are often more interesting than one’s own." See Sturmey (2005)) Brialy revealed that, despite early affairs with women, he was gay.

Brialy died on 30 May 2007, in his Monthyon home, after a long time with cancer. He bequeathed his Monthyon estate to the commune of Meaux, near Monthyon, with the following codicil: that the Meaux authorities would finance the estate's maintenance as long as his partner, Bruno Finck (1962-2021), would reside there. In the summer of 2020, Finck left the estate and, for "health reasons," moved to the south of France, upon which time the commune of Meaux assumed full ownership of the estate. At the end of January 2021, the mayor invited the association of the Friends of Jean-Claude Brialy to "work in close collaboration [with Meaux]" in the context of "enhancing" the star's "heritage."

== Honours ==
- Monaco: Commander of the Order of Cultural Merit (November 2002)

== Filmography ==
=== As actor ===
Year	Title	Role	Director	Notes
1956	Fool's Mate	Claude	Jacques Rivette	Short
1956	La Sonate à Kreutzer	Trukhacevskij	Éric Rohmer	
1957	A Friend of the Family	Philippe Lemonnier	Paolo Sorrentino	
1957	Young Girls Beware	Le client du sexy-bar	Yves Allégret	Uncredited
1957	Amour de poche	Jean-Loup	Pierre Kast	
1957	Anyone Can Kill Me	Jean-Claude	Henri Decoin	
1958	Elevator to the Gallows	a chess player	Louis Malle	Uncredited
1958	School for Coquettes	Robert	Jacqueline Audry	
1958	Le Beau Serge	François Baillou	Claude Chabrol	
1958	White Cargo	Jean	Georges Lacombe	
1958	The Lovers	the house husband	Louis Malle	Uncredited
1958	And Your Sister?	Bruno Puymartin	Maurice Delbez	
1958	Christine	Théo Kaiser	Pierre Gaspard-Huit	
1959	Les Cousins	Paul Thomas	Claude Chabrol	
1959	The 400 Blows	Man in Street	François Truffaut	
1959	All the Boys Are Called Patrick	Patrick	Jean-Luc Godard	Short
1959	Way of Youth	Paul Tiercelin	Michel Boisrond	
1959	Bad Girls Don't Cry	Scintillone	Mauro Bolognini	
1959	Eyes of Love	Pierre Ségur	Denys de La Patellière	
1960	Le Bel Âge	Jean-Claude	Pierre Kast	
1960	The Gigolo	Jacky	Jacques Deray	
1960	The Army Game	Capitaine	François Truffaut and Claude de Givray	Uncredited
1961	A Story of Water	young man in a car	Jean-Luc Godard and François Truffaut	Short
1961	Wise Guys	Ronald	Claude Chabrol	
1961	A Woman Is a Woman	Émile Récamier	Jean-Luc Godard	
1961	Three Faces of Sin	Laurent Renaud	François Villiers	
1961	The Lions Are Loose	Didier Marèze	Henri Verneuil	
1961	Amores Célebres	Törring	Michel Boisrond	(segment "Agnès Bernauer")
1961	Paris Belongs to Us	Jean-Marc	Jacques Rivette	
1962	A Very Private Affair	narrator	Louis Malle	Voice, Uncredited
1962	The Burning Court	Marc Desgrez	Julien Duvivier	
1962	The Seven Deadly Sins	Arthur	Claude Chabrol	(segment "Avarice, L'")
1962	Girl on the Road	Jean-Claude	Jacqueline Audry	
1962	Sentimental Education	Frédéric Moreau	Alexandre Astruc	
1962	Cléo from 5 to 7	the male nurse	Agnès Varda	Uncredited
1962	Arsène Lupin Versus Arsène Lupin	François de Vierne	Édouard Molinaro	
1962	The Devil and the Ten Commandments	Didier Martin	Julien Duvivier	(segment "Bien d'autrui ne prendras")
1963	Two Are Guilty	Jean-Philippe Prévost	André Cayatte	
1963	People in Luck	a young man in a car	Jack Pinoteau	(segment "Un gros lot"), Uncredited
1963	Carom Shots	Paul Martin	Marcel Bluwal	
1963	La banda Casaroli	Corrado Minguzzi	Florestano Vancini	
1963	Nutty, Naughty Chateau	Sébastien	Roger Vadim	
1964	La Bonne Soupe	Jacquot	Robert Thomas	
1964	Tonio Kröger	Tonio Kröger	Rolf Thiele	
1964	Male Hunt	Antoine Monteil	Édouard Molinaro	
1964	Circle of Love	Alfred	Roger Vadim	
1964	Male Companion	Antoine	Philippe de Broca	
1964	Comment épouser un premier ministre	Philippe Lambert	Michel Boisrond	
1964	Les siffleurs	Jean-Claude Brialy	Corneliu Porumboiu	
1964	Love at Sea	L'homme qui aime la nuit et la jeunesse	Guy Gilles	cameo appearance
1965	L'Amour à la chaîne	Le spectateur du cabaret	Claude de Givray	Uncredited
1965	La bonne occase		Michel Drach	Cameo Appearance
1965	Cent briques et des tuiles	Marcel	Pierre Grimblat	
1965	The Mandrake	Ligurio	Alberto Lattuada	
1965	I Knew Her Well	Dario Marchionni	Antonio Pietrangeli	
1966	Our Husbands	Ottavio	Luigi Zampa	(segment "Il marito di Olga")
1966	King of Hearts	the Duke of Trèfle	Philippe de Broca	
1967	Anna	Serge	Pierre Koralnik	TV movie
1967	Shock Troops	Jean	Costa-Gavras	
1967	The Oldest Profession	Philibert	Philippe de Broca	(segment "Mademoiselle Mimi")
1967	Lamiel	the Count of Aubigné	Jean Aurel	
1967	Operation St. Peter's	Cajella	Lucio Fulci	
1968	Manon 70	Jean-Paul	Jean Aurel	
1968	Darling Caroline	Comte de Boimussy	Denys de La Patellière	
1968	The Bride Wore Black	Corey	François Truffaut	
1970	The Ball of Count Orgel	Count of Orgel	Marc Allégret	
1970	Claire's Knee	Jérôme	Éric Rohmer	
1971	Gang War	Domenico "Mimì" Gargiulo	Steno	
1971	A Season in Hell	Paul Verlaine	Nelo Risi	
1972	Un meurtre est un meurtre	Paul Kastner	Étienne Périer	
1973	A Rare Bird	Armand, 'l'oiseau rare'	Jean-Claude Brialy	
1974	Loving in the Rain	Le dragueur	Jean-Claude Brialy	
1974	The Phantom of Liberty	Monsieur Foucault	Luis Buñuel	
1974	Like a Pot of Strawberries	Norbert	Jean Aurel	
1975	Catherine & Co.	Guillaume	Michel Boisrond	
1975	Les Onze Mille Verges	Le client de la gallerie d'art	Éric Lipmann	Uncredited
1976	The Judge and the Assassin	Villedieu	Bertrand Tavernier	
1976	Un animal doué de déraison	Claude	Pierre Kast	
1976	Scrambled Eggs	Brumaire	Joël Santoni	
1976	L'Année sainte	Pierre Bizet	Jean Girault	
1976	Barocco	Walt, the editor	André Téchiné	
1977	Julie pot de colle	Jean-Luc	Philippe de Broca	
1977	The Accuser	Le Rantec	Jean-Louis Bertucelli	
1977	Pour Clémence	Narrator	Charles Belmont	Voice
1977	Double Murder	Van Nijlen	Steno	
1978	Robert et Robert	Jacques Millet	Claude Lelouch	
1978	The Song of Roland	Le Seigneur	Frank Cassenti	
1979	Le Maître-nageur	Logan	Jean-Louis Trintignant	
1979	Bobo Jacco	Guillaume	Walter Bal	
1980	L'oeil du maître	Cazeau	Stéphane Kurc	
1980	The Lady Banker	Paul Cisterne	Francis Girod	
1981	Les Uns et les Autres	the Lido's director	Claude Lelouch	
1982	That Night in Varennes	Monsieur Jacob	Ettore Scola	
1982	The Girl from Trieste	Professor Martin	Pasquale Festa Campanile	
1983	Le Démon dans l'île	Dr. Paul Henry Marshall	Francis Leroi	
1983	Cap Canaille	Samuel Kedabjan	Juliet Berto and Jean-Henri Roger	
1983	Deadly Circuit	Monsieur Voragine	Claude Miller	
1983	Édith et Marcel	Loulou Barrier	Claude Lelouch	
1983	Sarah	Gabriel Larcange	Maurice Dugowson	
1983	Stella	Roland Caron	Laurent Heynemann	
1983	La Crime	Jean-François Rambert	Philippe Labro	
1983	Gramps Is in the Resistance	tennis player sycophant	Jean-Marie Poiré	
1984	Pinot simple flic	Morcy	Gérard Jugnot	
1985	Le téléphone sonne toujours deux fois!!	the inspector	Jean-Pierre Vergne	
1985	Le 4ème pouvoir	Serge Leroy	TV director	
1985	Le Mariage du siècle	Kaffenberg	Philippe Galland	
1985	An Impudent Girl	Sam	Claude Miller	
1986	Inspecteur Lavardin	Claude Alvarez	Claude Chabrol	
1986	Suivez mon regard	Freddy Langlois, l'impresario	Jean Curtelin	
1986	A Man and a Woman: 20 Years Later	Un spectateur de '40 ans déjà'	Claude Lelouch	Uncredited
1986	Le Débutant	Willy	Daniel Janneau	
1987	Lévy et Goliath	Bijou / Delaroche	Gérard Oury	
1987	Grand Guignol	M. Albert	Jean Marboeuf	
1987	Maschenka	Kolin	John Goldschmidt	
1987	Le Moustachu	Leroy	Dominique Chaussois	
1987	Maladie d'amour	Frédéric	Jacques Deray	
1987	Les Innocents	Klotz	André Téchiné	
1989	Comédie d'été	Gaston	Daniel Vigne	
1990	There Was a Castle with Forty Dogs	the judge	Duccio Tessari	
1990	My New Partner II	Le banquier	Claude Zidi	
1990	Faux et usage de faux	Charles Laumière	Laurent Heynemann	
1990	No Fear, No Die	Pierre Ardennes	Claire Denis	
1991	Août	Martin	Henri Herré	
1994	La Reine Margot	Coligny	Patrice Chéreau	
1994	The Monster	Mr. Roccarotta	Roberto Benigni	
1995	One Hundred and One Nights	the guide for Japanese tourists	Agnès Varda	
1995	A French Woman	Arnoult	Régis Wargnier	
1995	Beaumarchais	Abbot	Édouard Molinaro	
1995	Le Fils de Gascogne	Himself	Pascal Aubier	
1996	Beaumarchais	Abbot	Édouard Molinaro	
1996	Unpredictable Nature of the River	Monsieur de Saint-Chamont	Bernard Giraudeau	
1996	Portraits chinois	René Sandre	Martine Dugowson	
1999	L'Homme de ma vie	Lucien Vilner	Stéphane Kurc	
1999	Kennedy et moi	Benny Grimaldi	Sam Karmann	
2000	Les Acteurs	Himself	Bertrand Blier	
2000	In extremis	The lawyer	Étienne Faure	
2001	Concorrenza sleale	Nonno Mattia	Ettore Scola	
2001	South Kensington	Fernandino	Carlo Vanzina	
2002	Les Filles, personne s'en méfie	Le projectionniste	Charlotte Silvera	
2002	Special Delivery	Robert Fresnel	Jeanne Labrune	
2003	The Car Keys	Himself	Laurent Baffie	
2004	People	Minimo	Fabien Onteniente	
2005	Quartier V.I.P.	Ferdinand	Laurent Firode	
2005	Les Rois maudits	Hugues de Bouville	Josée Dayan	Episode: "Le Roi de Fer"
2007	Vous êtes de la police ?	Alfred Lamproie	Romuald Beugnon	(final film role)

=== As director ===
- Eglantine (1972)
- Closed Shutters (1973)
- A Rare Bird (1973)
- Loving in the Rain (1974)
- La nuit de l'été (1979)
- Les malheurs de Sophie (1981)
- Cinq-Mars (1981)
- A Good Little Devil (1983)
- Vacances bourgeoises (1996)
- Georges Dandin de Molière (1997)
- La dame aux camélias (1998) with Cristiana Reali and Michaël Cohen
- Les parents terribles (2003)
