= The Green Domino =

1935 film

- Written by: Marcel Aymé; Harald Bratt; Emil Burri; Erich Ebermayer (novel)
- Produced by: Alfred Greven
- Cinematography: Otto Baecker; Günther Rittau
- Music by: Gottfried Huppertz; Walter Schütze
- Production company: Universum Film (UFA)
- Distributed by: L'Alliance Cinématographique Européenne (ACE)
- Release date: 27 December 1935
- Running time: 84 minutes
- Country: France
- Language: French

The Green Domino (French: Le Domino vert) is a 1935 French/German drama film directed by Henri Decoin and Herbert Selpin, based on a play by Erich Ebermayer. It was released on DVD in France on 5 April 2007.

== Synopsis ==
A rich heiress falls in love with an art critic after his wife has been murdered.

== Cast ==
- Danielle Darrieux as Hélène de Richemond / Marianne
- Charles Vanel as Nebel
- Maurice Escande as Henri Bruquier, le critique d'art
- Daniel Lecourtois as Naulin
- Marcel Herrand as M. de Richemond
- Jany Holt as Lily Bruquier
- Jeanne Pérez
- Henri Beaulieu as Monsieur de Fallec, Hélène's uncle
- Marcelle Géniat as Mademoiselle de Fallec, Hélène's aunt
- André Burgère as Robert Zamietti
- Henri Guisol
- Georges Douking
- Henry Bonvallet
- Lucien Dayle
- Jeanne Pérez
