= Le Beau Serge =

1958 film

- Film poster
- Directed by: Claude Chabrol
- Written by: Claude Chabrol
- Produced by: Claude Chabrol
- Starring: Gérard Blain; Jean-Claude Brialy; Michèle Méritz; Bernadette Lafont
- Cinematography: Henri Decaë
- Edited by: Jacques Gaillard
- Music by: Émile Delpierre
- Release date: 1958
- Running time: 99 minutes
- Country: France
- Language: French
- Budget: Fr 37,000,000

Le Beau Serge (French pronunciation: [lə bo sɛʁʒ], literal English translation: "Handsome Serge") is a 1958 French film directed by Claude Chabrol. It has been cited as the first product of the Nouvelle Vague, or French New Wave, film movement. The film is often compared with Chabrol's subsequent film Les Cousins, which also stars Gérard Blain and Jean-Claude Brialy.

== Plot ==
François, a young man recovering from an illness (probably tuberculosis), returns to his home town of Sardent after a long absence to spend the winter there. He is surprised to find that his old friend Serge, dissatisfied with life in the village, has become a wretched alcoholic. Serge had hoped to leave the village to study, but had to stay to marry a local girl, Yvonne, when she became pregnant. Their first child was stillborn, but Yvonne is pregnant again.

Though François feels somewhat out of place in the provincial village, he is driven by his desire to figure out a way to help Serge. While he works on this, he strikes up a relationship with Yvonne's promiscuous 17-year-old sister, Marie, with whom Serge perhaps has a sexual history. Marie lives with her father Glomaud, a drunk who is rumored to not really be her biological father, though no one knows if he is aware of this. One afternoon, Glomaud sees François in the hotel tavern. He tells him to buy him a drink, but François refuses. "You won't drink with me, but you'll sleep with my daughter?" Glomaud yells. François says Marie is not his daughter. Glomaud calls witnesses to attest to François' statement, then stumbles off to rape Marie, whom he says he has lusted after for three years. When François visits Marie later, he finds Marie weeping in the bed and realizes what happened.

Serge and François alternately reminisce about the past and argue about the present and future. Things between them come to a head at a town dance when François objects to Serge's callous treatment of Yvonne. He follows Serge into the street and gets a beating for his troubles. The villagers watch, exhorting Serge to "teach the Parisian a lesson." The local priest advises him to leave, and he is probably doing more harm than good. Stubbornly, François decides to stay in the village to perform good deeds.

When François hears that Yvonne has gone into labor and neither the doctor nor Serge can be found, he jumps into action. First, he tracks down the doctor, who is attending to a sick Glomaud. The doctor does not want to leave but Glomaud asks him to go, since he has Marie to care for him. Going out again into the cold and dark, François finds Serge very drunk, sleeping in a chicken pen. François has to drag him home through the snow, but they make it in time for the birth of a healthy, though premature, baby boy. François faints in exhaustion while Serge beams, crying and laughing.

== Cast ==
- Gérard Blain as Serge
- Jean-Claude Brialy as François Bayon
- Michèle Méritz as Yvonne
- Bernadette Lafont as Marie
- Claude Cerval as the priest
- Jeanne Pérez as Madame Chaunier
- Edmond Beauchamp as Glomaud
- André Dino as the doctor
- Michel Creuze as Michel, the baker
- Claude Chabrol as La Truffe
- Philippe de Broca as Jacques Rivette de la Chasuble

== Production ==
At one point, Chabrol had intended for Les Cousins, rather than Le Beau Serge, to be his first film project, but, due to that film's Paris setting, it would have been twice as expensive to film. Le Beau Serge was filmed in Sardent, where Chabrol, whose mother was from the village, often spent childhood summers with his grandmother and lived during the war years. It was shot over a period of nine weeks in the winter of 1957-8 on a budget of 32 million old French francs, which Chabrol acquired courtesy of an inheritance his first wife had received. The film was initially 2 hours and 35 minutes long. To reduce the running time, Chabrol cut a great deal of quasi-documentary material, a decision he later regretted.

== Release ==
The film premiered at the 1958 Cannes Film Festival (out of competition) and received a general release in France on January 10, 1959. In the U.S., the Criterion Collection released the film in Blu-Ray and DVD. It won Best Director in 1958 Locarno Film Festival and 1959 Prix Jean Vigo.

François Truffaut, Chabrol's fellow critic at Cahiers du cinéma, wrote: "Technically, the film is as masterly as if Chabrol had been directing for ten years, though this is his first contact with a camera." It currently holds 100% approval rating at Rotten Tomatoes.
