= Carom Shots =

1963 film

- Directed by: Marcel Bluwal
- Written by: Fred Kassak (novel); Pierre Tchernia; Michel Audiard
- Produced by: Alain Poiré
- Starring: Jean-Claude Brialy
- Cinematography: André Bac
- Edited by: Geneviève Vaury
- Music by: Gérard Calvi
- Distributed by: Gaumont Distribution
- Release date: 15 May 1963
- Running time: 88 minutes
- Country: France
- Language: French

Carom Shots (French: Carambolages) is a 1963 French black comedy film directed by Marcel Bluwal. It was entered into the 1963 Cannes Film Festival. The French crime writer Fred Kassak felt his novel had been betrayed by the filmmakers.

== Cast ==
- Jean-Claude Brialy as Paul Martin
- Louis de Funès as Norbert Charolais
- Michel Serrault as Le commissaire Baudu / Policeman Baudu
- Sophie Daumier as Solange
- Anne Tonietti as Danielle Brossard
- Henri Virlojeux as Brossard
- Alfred Adam as Hubert Beaumanoir
- Marcelle Arnold as Mademoiselle Andréa
- René Clermont as Frépillon
- Jacques Dynam as Macheron
- Paul Gay as Le speaker TV / TV anchor
- Gilberte Géniat as Madame Brossard
