= Jeanne Pérez =

French actress

- Born: 28 September 1894; Castelsarrasin, Tarn-et-Garonne, Midi-Pyrénées, France
- Died: 11 May 1975 (aged 80); Cambo-les-Bains, Labourd, France
- Occupation: Actress
- Years active: 1930–1975

Jeanne Pérez (28 September 1894 – 11 May 1975) was a French actress in 71 films, TV movies and series between 1930 and 1975.

== Filmography ==
Year	Title	Role	Notes
1930	Paris by Night	Mélie	
1931	Tout s'arrange	Constnace	
1935	The Green Domino	Thérèse - la bonne	
1937	Wells in Flames	Marina	
1938	La route enchantée	Faustine	
1941	Portrait of Innocence	La mère de Jeannot	
1942	Le Mariage de Chiffon	Madame Férez	
1943	Les Roquevillard	Camille Roquevillard	
1947	Devil in the Flesh	Madame Marin	
1949	Return to Life	La mère de famille	(segment 3 : "Le retour de Jean"), Uncredited
1949	Le Sorcier du ciel	La gardienne	
1958	Le Beau Serge	Madame Chaunier	
1959	Les Cousins	La femme de ménage	
1959	Green Harvest	Mlle Froment	
1960	Classe Tous Risques	Jacqueline Chapuis	
1960	Les Jeux de l'amour	Le buraliste	
1960	Croesus	Marie	
1960	The Gigolo	Marthe	
1961	Wise Guys	La veuve Goupil	
1962	Adieu Philippine	La voisine	
1962	The Seven Deadly Sins	La vestiaire	(segment "Avarice, L'"), Uncredited
1962	Maléfices	Mother Capitaine	
1962	Le Monte-charge	La vendeuse	
1962	Thérèse Desqueyroux	Balionte	
1964	Diary of a Chambermaid	La commère	
1965	Circus Angel	La Bretonne	
1967	An Idiot in Paris	Germaine Catolle	
1967	L'une et l'autre		
1969	Army of Shadows		
1969	The Witness	Hanka	
1972	Un meurtre est un meurtre	Une vieille commére	
1973	Le concierge	Mathilde	
1973	Poil de carotte	Honorine	
1974	La merveilleuse visite		
