= Guy Vassal =

French playwright (1941–2022)

- Born: 8 March 1941; Toulouse, France
- Died: 13 November 2022 (aged 81)
- Occupation: Playwright

Guy Vassal (8 March 1941 – 13 November 2022) was a French playwright.

== Biography ==
Born in Toulouse in 1941, Vassal studied under Charles Dullin. At the age of 20, during the Algerian War, he joined the cast of Antigone, directed by Jean Vilar. In 1963, his first play, Le Temps des troubadours, covered the Albigensian Crusade. It was adapted for television in many shows, including L'Affaire Calas.

From the 1970s to 2000, Vassal created and directed many festivals in Albi, Aigues-Mortes, Carcassonne, and Lattes. At the same time, he led a "militant activity of theatrical decentralization" and created the Théâtre populaire des Cévennes. In some plays, such as Grappes de ma vigne, he focused on novelistic writing, which led to his publication of La Boussole in 2006.

Vassal died on 13 November 2022, at the age of 81.

== Books ==
- La Dame fantôme (2001)
- La Boussole : des confins de la Sibérie à Versailles avec le messager de Lapérouse (2006)
- Coup de balai pour Don Juan (2015)
