= Eugène Le Roy =

French author (1836–1907)

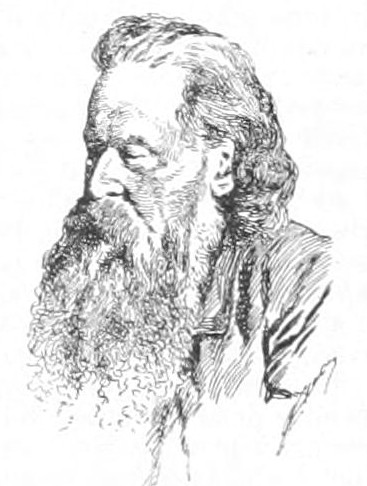
Eugene Le Roy.jpg

Eugène Le Roy (French pronunciation: [øʒɛn lə ʁwa]; 29 November 1836, Hautefort – 6 May 1907, Montignac, Dordogne) was a French author.

== Early life ==
Eugène Le Roy was born in 1836 in Hautefort, a commune in the Dordogne department in Nouvelle-Aquitaine in southwestern France. His parents were servants to Ange Hyacinthe Maxence de Damas de Cormaillon, Baron de Damas, a former minister who owned the Château de Hautefort. The circumstances there forced them to leave Le Roy with a nurse at a peasant's house in the neighborhood. His childhood memories strongly influenced his future work, which featured many storylines with abandoned children. This was an undeniable social reality of the time that later became one of the clichés of the era's popular romances.

From 1841 to 1847, Le Roy studied at a rural school in Hautefort at a time when most children remained illiterate. He moved to Périgueux in 1848 for further studies at École des Frères. One prominent memory of his childhood was the planting of a tree of freedom (Arbre de la liberté) to celebrate advent in the Second Republic.

== Career ==
In 1851, he refused to join a seminary and became a grocer in Paris. He joined the socialists, as described in his novel Le Moulin du Frau, and assisted with the establishment of the Second Empire. In 1855, he enlisted in the 4th regiment of the French cavalry and participated in military campaigns in Algeria and Italy. He served for 5 years, but then resigned after being demoted in rank for insubordination.

In 1860, after passing the entry exam for the civil service, he became an assistant tax collector in Périgueux. During the Franco-German War of 1870, he joined the francs-tireurs, an irregular military force deployed by France during the early stages of war. Following the final French defeat in 1871, he rejoined the tax collection service in Montignac. He subsequently fell very ill and spent the best part of a year recovering from his illness.

In 1877, Le Roy applied for admission to the Masonic lodge Les Amis Persévérants et l'Étoile de Vesone Réunis in eastern Périgueux, but the Prefect of Dordogne was ordered by the Minister of the Interior, Oscar Bardi de Fourtou, to close some Masonic Lodges, including the one Le Roy had joined. Le Roy was reinstated as a tax collector during 1878 after Mac Mahon lost the elections of October 1877.

He retired to Montignac at the beginning of the 20th century. He was offered the Légion d'honneur in 1904, however, he declined it.

=== Writing ===
On 14 June 1877, Le Roy married his mistress Marie Peyronnet, with whom he already had a three-year-old son, in a civil ceremony, His non-conformity and his republicanism resulted in his dismissal, along with (and for the same reason) thousands of other government officials, by the government of Mac-Mahon. Soon after his dismissal, he began to write abundantly.

Beginning in 1878, Eugène Le Roy wrote many republican and anti-clerical articles for local newspapers, notably Le Réveil de la Dordogne. As an advocate of the separation of Church and State, he wrote in the political and philosophical vein of radical Freemasonry during the latter half of the nineteenth century. His first novel Le Moulin du Frau was published in 1890 and was politically biased in favour of radicalism. He then published Traditions et Révolutions en Périgord pendant la seconde moitié du XIX^{e} siècle.

From 1891 to 1901, Eugène Le Roy wrote a 1086 page manuscript entitled Études critiques sur le christianisme. In 1899, he published the novel Jacquou le Croquant, which tells the story of a peasant revolt against the social injustices of his time, from the restoration era until the end of the nineteenth century. This was made into a television series in 1969.

== Selected works ==
- Le Moulin de Frau (1891), paru en feuilleton dans L'Avenir de la Dordogne du 2 avril au 21 août 1891 puis chez Fasquelle en 1905. 1910 ed.
- Jacquou le Croquant (1899), paru en feuilleton dans la Revue de Paris du 15 mars au 15 mai 1899 puis chez Calmann-Lévy en 1900. — Édition numérique disponible sur Wikisource en trois formats : ePub, PDF, MOBI.
  - translated as Jacquou the Rebel by Eleanor Stimson Brooks
- La Damnation de Saint-Guynefort (1937), composé en 1901, édité en 1937 chez Sedrowski.
- Nicette et Milou (1900) : Milou, paru de novembre à décembre 1900 dans la Revue de Paris puis chez Calmann-Lévy en 1901. Nicette, paru du 15 mars au 24 mai 1901 dans la Revue de Paris puis chez Calmann-Lévy en 1901.
- L'Année rustique en Périgord (1903), articles parus du 21 novembre 1903 au 7 juin 1904 dans Le petit centre de Limoges, puis publié à Bergerac en 1906.
- La Belle Coutelière (1905), nouvelle publiée avec trois autres nouvelles à travers Au Pays des Pierres, puis parue seule chez Fanlac en 2012.
- Au Pays des pierres (1906), Fasquelle.
- Les Gens d'Auberoque (1906), paru dans la Revue de Paris du 1 mai au 1 juillet 1906, puis chez Calmann-Lévy en 1906.
- Mademoiselle de la Ralphie (1906), paru en feuilleton dans La petite République du 25 février au 26 avril 1906, puis chez F. Rieder en 1921.
- L'Ennemi de la mort (1912), paru dans la Revue des deux Mondes à partir du 15 juillet 1912, puis par Calmann-Lévy en 1912.
- Études critiques sur le christianisme (2007), paru aux Éditions La Lauze, Périgueux à partir d'un manuscrit de 1086 pages retrouvé aux Archives Départementales du Périgord. Avec des introductions de Guy Penaud, Richard Bordes et Jean Page.

Principal editions

- Œuvres complètes aux Éditions du Périgord Noir, Périgueux.
- Choix (Le Moulin du Frau; Jacquou le Croquant; Les gens d’Auberoque; Nicette et Milou) au Livre club Diderot.
- Plusieurs titres aux éditions Fanlac, dont La Belle Coutelière et La Damnation de saint Guynefort.
- En poche : Jacquou le Croquant (1899) et l’Ennemi de la Mort.
- Au cours du premier semestre 2007, les Éditions de La Lauze, de Périgueux, ont publié le dernier texte inédit d'Eugène Le Roy, Études critiques sur le christianisme, avec des introductions de Guy Penaud, Richard Bordes et Jean Page; ISBN 2352490154.

Adaptations for television and cinema

- Jacquou le Croquant by Stellio Lorenzi, 1969.
- Jacquou le Croquant, film by Laurent Boutonnat, 2007.
- L'Ennemi de la mort, téléfilm de Roger Vrigny and Roger Kahane, 1981.

Biographies and studies on the author and his works

- Un franc-maçon périgourdin : Eugène Le Roy », Bulletin de la Société Historique et Archéologique du Périgord, 1978, pp. 69 à 74
- Eugène Le Roy, Sapeur-Pompier », Bulletin du « Congrès national des sapeurs-pompiers français », Périgueux, 1980
- Richard Bordes et Claude Lacombe, Le Vrai Visage d'Eugène Le Roy. Contre-enquête sur un républicain, anticlérical, libre penseur et franc-maçon de la III^{e} République, éditions La Lauze, 2010.
- Le numéro 3 des Cahiers de Vésone est consacré à Eugène Le Roy (éditions Fanlac).
- Guy Penaud et José Correa, La Cuisine rustique au temps de Jacquou le Croquant, 2004, Éditions de La Lauze, Périgueux (France)
- Guy Penaud et José Correa, Le Roy à Hautefort, 2007, Éditions de La Lauze, Périgueux (France)
- Guy Citerne, La vie traditionnelle dans le Périgord d’Eugène Le Roy, BT2 nº 167, CEL 1984.
- Guy Citerne, Traditions et Révolutions dans le Périgord d’Eugène Le Roy, BT2 nº 167, CEL 1984.
- Marcel Secondat, Eugène Le Roy connu et inconnu, Éditions du Périgord Noir, 1978.

== See also ==
- The Soufflaculs of Nontron
