= Stellio Lorenzi =

French screenwriter

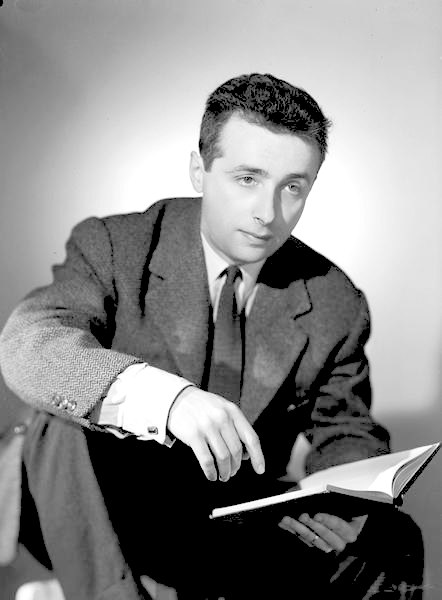
- Lorenzi photographed at Studio Harcourt, 1955
- Born: Stellio Antoine Lorenzi; 7 May 1921; Paris, 17th arrondissement, France
- Died: 25 September 1990 (aged 69); Paris, 5th arrondissement, France

Stellio Antoine Lorenzi (7 May 1921 – 25 September 1990) was a French screenwriter, director and communist.

== Early years ==
Lorenzi was born Stellio Antoine Lorenz on 7 May 1921 in 17th arrondissement of Paris to an Italian father from Sanremo. and a French mother. He spent his childhood and adolescence in Cannes then moved to the capital. After three years of graduate studies in mathematics, he turned to architectural. The entrance exam to the École Polytechnique was forbidden to him, because the laws of the Vichy regime refused access to the sons of foreigners. In 1944, he was assistant director to Jacques Becker on Paris Frills. He continued this career until 1951 with directors such as Jacques de Baroncelli, Marc Maurette, Louis Daquinor and Gilles Grangier.

On 25 September 1990, Lorenzi died in the 5th arrondissement of Paris aged 69.
